= List of Australian films of 1977 =

== 1977 ==
Title	Director	Cast	Genre	Notes
ABBA: The Movie	Lasse Hallström	ABBA (Benny Andersson, Agnetha Faltskog, Anni-Frid Lyngstad, Björn Ulvaeus), Robert Hughes, Tom Oliver, Bruce Barry	Musical Feature film	IMDb
All at Sea	Igor Auzins	Johnny Pace, Harriet Pace, Mike Preston, Joe Martin, Noel Ferrier, Barry Creyton, Abigail, Stuart Wagstaff, Joy Chambers, Cornelia Frances, Ugly Dave Gray, Syd Heylen, Sheila Kennelly, Megan Williams, Barbara Wyndon, Cheryl Sciro, Allan Penney	Comedy TV film	
Backroads	Phillip Noyce	Bill Hunter, Gary Foley	Action / Drama	IMDb
Ballantyne's Mission	Ian Crawford	Michael Long, Keith Eden, Gary Gray, Aileen Britton, Ivar Kants, Veronica Lang, Elli Maclure, Rosie Sturgess	Drama TV film	
The Bad Society	Mike Jacob, Gil Scrine		Short documentary	IMDb
Blue Fire Lady	Ross Dimsey	Cathryn Harrison, Mark Holden, Peter Cummins, Marion Edward, Roy Higgins, Syd Conabere, Gary Waddell, John Ewart, John Wood, Lloyd Cunnington, Irene Hewitt, Liddy Clark, Leila Hayes, Bill Collins	Drama / Family Feature film	IMDb
Cass	Chris Noonan	Michele Fawdon, John Waters, Judy Morris, Max Cullen, Peter Carroll, Anna Volska, Stephen O'Rourke, Sandra McGregor, Peter Whitford, John Ewart, Paula Duncan	Drama TV film	
The Cake Man	Douglas Sharp	Brian Syron, Justine Saunders, Edward Phillips, Neil Fitzpatrick, Hugh Keays-Byrne, Graham Rouse, Ray Marshall, Terry Jowett	ABC TV film	aka ABC Teleplay
Chalk And Cheese	Denny Lawrence	John Hamblin, Margaret Nelson	Short film	
The Claim	Keith Gow	Henri Szeps, Don Reid, Harry Lawrence, Phillip Ross, Graeme Smith, Maggie Kirkpatrick, Max Osbiston, Ron Graham, Gerry Duggan, Peter Corbett, Ben Gabriel, Georgia Brown, Veronica Lang, Gordon Piper, Shane Porteous, Serge Lazareff, Richard Gilbert, Tom Farley, Ray Bennett, Rita Ryder, Roger Ward, Louis Wishart	Docu-drama TV film	
Cosy Cool	Gary Young			IMDb
Cradle Song	Gillian Coote	Michele Fawdon, Jesse McNair, Michael Brindley, Betty Dyson, Peter Thompson	Short film	
The Death Train	Igor Auzins	Hugh Keays-Byrne, Ingrid Mason, Max Meldrum, Brian Wenzel, Ken Goodlet, Colin Taylor, John Orcsik, Ralph Cotterill, Aileen Britton, Les Foxcroft, Justine Saunders, Ron Haddrick	Drama / Mystery TV film	
Dot and the Kangaroo	Yoram Gross	Voices: Barbara Frawley, Joan Bruce, Anne Haddy, Ron Haddrick	Animation / Family / Musical Feature film	IMDb
Fantasm Comes Again	Eric Ram (alias for Colin Eggleston)		Erotica / Documentary Feature film	IMDb
The FJ Holden	Michael Thornhill	Paul Couzens, Eva Dickinson, Carl Stever, Gary Waddell, Graham Rouse, Sigrid Thornton, Colin Yarwood, Ray Marshall, Karlene Rogerson, Maggie Kirkpatrick, Frankie J Holden	Drama Feature film	IMDb
The Getting of Wisdom	Bruce Beresford	Susannah Fowle	Drama	IMDb
Going Home	Frank Arnold	Terence Donovan, Rowena Wallace, Vincent Ball, Mark Clark, Jennifer Cluff, Tom Farley, Peter Gwynne, Bill Hunter, Kerry McGuire, Moya O'Sullivan, Tom Oliver, Jennifer West	Drama ABC TV film / Teleplay	Screened as 'Stuart Wagstaff's World Playhouse' series
Gone to Ground	Kevin Dobson	Charles Tingwell, Eric Oldfield, Robyn Gibbes, Elaine Lee, Marion Johns, Judy Lynne, Dennis Grosvenor, Allan Penney, Robert Bruning	Mystery / Thriller TV film	
Harvest of Hate	Michael Thornhill	Dennis Grosvenor, Kris McQuade, Michael Aitkens, Leon Cosak, John Orcsik, Richard Meikle	Drama / Thriller TV film	
High Rolling	Igor Auzins	Joseph Bottoms, Grigor Taylor, Judy Davis, Wendy Hughes, Sandra McGregor, John Clayton, Gus Mercurio, Roger Ward, Robert Hewett, Chantal Contouri, Terry Norris, Sean Scully, Simon Chilvers	Action / Drama Feature film	IMDb
Highway One	Steven Otton		feature film	
Inside Looking Out	Paul Cox	Briony Behets, Tony Llewellyn-Jones, Elke Neidhardt, Juliet Bacskai, Dani Eddy, Norman Kaye	Drama Feature film	IMDb
Journey Among Women	Tom Cowan	Jeune Pritchard, Lillian Crombie, Nell Campbell, Diana Fuller, Lisa Peers, Martin Phelan, Tim Elliot, Jude Kuring, Ralph Cotterill	Drama Feature film	IMDb
The Last Wave	Peter Weir	Richard Chamberlain, Olivia Hamnett, David Gulpilil, Vivean Gray, Wallas Eaton, Nadjwarra Amagula, Fred Parslow, John Frawley	Fantasy / Thriller Feature film	IMDb
Listen to the Lion				IMDb
The Love Letters from Teralba Road	Stephen Wallace	Kris McQuade, Bryan Brown, Gia Carides	Drama Short Feature film	IMDb
The Mango Tree	Kevin James Dobson	Geraldine Fitzgerald, Robert Helpmann, Christopher Pate, Carol Burns, Terry McDermott, Ben Gabriel, Gloria Dawn, Gerry Duggan, Diane Craig, Tony Bonner, Gary Day	Drama Feature film	IMDb
The Newman Shame	Julian Pringle	George Lazenby, Diane Craig, Alwyn Kurts, Joan Bruce, Judy Nunn, Barrie Barkla, Ken Goodlet, Robert Bruning, Alan Cassell, Julia Moody	Mystery / Thriller TV film	IMDb
Out of It	Ken Cameron			IMDb
The Picture Show Man	John Power	Rod Taylor, John Meillon, John Ewart, Harold Hopkins, Sally Conabere, Jeanie Drynan, Garry McDonald, Patrick Cargill, Yelena Zigon, Tony Barry, Ernie Bourne, Judy Morris	Adventure / Drama Feature film	IMDb
Plunge Into Darkness	Peter Maxwell	Olivia Hamnett, Bruce Barry, Ashley Grenville, Tom Richards, John Jarratt, Wallas Eaton, Alister Smart, John Ewart	Mystery / Thriller TV film	IMDb
Puzzle	Gordon Hessler	James Franciscus, Wendy Hughes, Robert Helpmann, Peter Gwynne, Tony Barry, Gerard Kennedy, Kerry McGuire	Action / Thriller ABC TV film US Co-production	
Raw Deal	Russell Hagg	Gerard Kennedy, Gus Mercurio, Rod Mullinar, Christopher Pate, Hu Pryce, John Cousins, Michael Carman, Gary Day, Briony Behets, Reg Evans, Norman Yemm	Western / Drama Feature film	IMDb
Roses Bloom Twice	Paul Eddey	Glynis McNichol, Michael Craig, John Allen, Diane Craig, Lyndon Harris, Jennifer West, James Moss, Ron Graham	Drama / Romance TV film	IMDb
Say You Want Me	Oliver Howes	Belinda Giblin, Serge Lazareff, Hugh Keays-Byrne, Henri Szeps, Tom Oliver, Moya O'Sullivan, Robyn Nevin, Kevin Leslie, Tex Morton, Barry Lovett, Gordon Glenwright, Grant Dodwell, Louise Howitt	Drama TV film	
She'll Be Sweet	Gene Levitt	Tony Lo Bianco, Sally Kellerman, Rod Mullinar, Anne Semler, Kevin Leslie, Jacqueline Kott, Ken Fraser	Comedy / Drama ABC TV film US Co-production	aka Magee and the Lady
Shimmering Light	Don Chaffey	Beau Bridges, Lloyd Bridges, Victoria Shaw, Ingrid Mason, Wendy Playfair, Mark Hembrow, Patrick Ward, Robert Bettles	Drama ABC TV film US Co-production	
The Singer and the Dancer	Gillian Armstrong	Ruth Cracknell, Elizabeth Crosby, Russell Kiefel, Jude Kuring, Gerry Duggan, Julie Dawson, Kate Sheil, Jane Buckland, Kerry Walker, Rob Steele	Drama Short Feature film	IMDb
Summer City	Christopher Fraser	Mel Gibson, Steve Bisley, John Jarratt, Phil Avalon, James Elliott, Abigail, Ward 'Pally' Austin, Debbie Forman	Drama / Thriller Feature film	IMDb
Summerfield	Ken Hannam	John Waters, Nick Tate, Elizabeth Alexander, Charles Tingwell, Geraldine Turner, Max Cullen, Sheila Florance, Michelle Jarman, Joy Westmore	Mystery / Thriller Feature film	IMDb
The Trial of Ned Kelly	John Gauci	John Waters, Gerard Kennedy, Alan Hopgood, Peter Cummins, Sean Scully, John Frawley, Jonathan Hardy, Narrator David Ravenswood	Crime / Drama ABC TV film	
What a Way to Go (aka: Bottoms Up)	Karl Rawicz			IMDb

== See also ==
- 1978 in Australia
- 1978 in Australian television
