= Russell Boyd =

Australian cinematographer

Russell Boyd AO, ACS, ASC
- Born: Russell Stewart Boyd; 21 April 1944 (age 82); Victoria, Australia
- Occupation: Cinematographer
- Years active: 1966–2018
- Organization(s): Australian Cinematographers Society; American Society of Cinematographers

Russell Stewart Boyd, AO, ACS, ASC, (born 21 April 1944) is an Australian cinematographer, known as a key figure of the Australian New Wave movement from the 1970s, with his work on Picnic at Hanging Rock (1975) helping to shape the visual aesthetic of Australian cinema.

In 2003, Boyd won the Academy Award for Best Cinematography for Master and Commander: The Far Side of the World.

== Early life ==
Born into a rural Victorian family, he spent his early years on a small farm near Geelong, where his father worked as a wool classer.

== Career ==
Boyd started his professional career at Cinesound in Melbourne as a general assistant. Seeking broader opportunities, he moved to Sydney in the mid-1960s, where he worked on documentaries and commercials at Supreme Studios.

In 1974, Boyd made his breakthrough with Between Wars, earning him the Australian Cinematographers Society (ACS) Milli Award for Cinematographer of the Year.

=== Australian New Wave and collaboration with Peter Weir ===
Boyd played a pivotal role in the Australian New Wave cinema movement of the 1970s, which revitalised the country's film industry. His collaboration with director Peter Weir began in 1975 with Picnic at Hanging Rock, a film that is widely credited with putting Australian cinema on the world map. His work on the film also earned Boyd a BAFTA Award for Best Cinematography.

He would later work on five other movies with Weir: The Last Wave (1977), Gallipoli (1981), The Year of Living Dangerously (1982), Master and Commander: The Far Side of the World (2003), and The Way Back (2010).

=== Hollywood career ===
In the early 1980s, Boyd expanded his career to Hollywood, working with Australian directors who had also made the transition. He served as cinematographer on Bruce Beresford's Tender Mercies (1983) and Gillian Armstrong's Mrs. Soffel (1984).

He also worked on mainstream productions like White Men Can't Jump (1992), Liar Liar (1997) and Dr. Dolittle (1998).

== Filmography ==
=== Feature film ===
Year	Title	Director
1974	Matchless	John Papadopoulos
1974	Between Wars	Michael Thornhill
1975	The Man from Hong Kong	Brian Trenchard-Smith
1975	Picnic at Hanging Rock	Peter Weir
1975	The Golden Cage	Ayten Kuyululu
1976	Summer of Secrets	Jim Sharman
1976	Break of Day	Ken Hannam
1977	The Singer and the Dancer	Gillian Armstrong
1977	Backroads	Phillip Noyce
1977	The Last Wave	Peter Weir
1979	Dawn!	Ken Hannam
1979	Just Out of Reach	Linda Blagg
1980	The Chain Reaction	Ian Barry
1981	...Maybe This Time	Chris McGill
1981	Gallipoli	Peter Weir
1982	Starstruck	Gillian Armstrong
1982	The Year of Living Dangerously	Peter Weir
1983	Tender Mercies	Bruce Beresford
1983	Phar Lap	Simon Wincer
1984	A Soldier's Story	Norman Jewison
1984	Mrs. Soffel	Gillian Armstrong
1984	Stanley	Esben Storm
1985	Burke & Wills	Graeme Clifford
1986	Crocodile Dundee	Peter Faiman
1987	High Tide	Gillian Armstrong
1987	The Perfectionist	Chris Thomson
1988	Crocodile Dundee II	John Cornell
1988	The Rescue	Ferdinand Fairfax
1989	In Country	Norman Jewison
1990	Blood Oath	Stephen Wallace
1990	Almost an Angel	John Cornell
1991	Sweet Talker	Michael Jenkins
1992	Turtle Beach	Stephen Wallace
1992	White Men Can't Jump	Ron Shelton
1992	Forever Young	Steve Miner
1994	Cobb	Ron Shelton
1995	Operation Dumbo Drop	Simon Wincer
1996	Tin Cup	Ron Shelton
1997	Liar Liar	Tom Shadyac
1998	Dr. Dolittle	Betty Thomas
2000	Company Man	Peter Askin; Douglas McGrath
2001	Serenades	Mojgan Khadem
2001	American Outlaws	Les Mayfield
2003	Master and Commander: The Far Side of the World	Peter Weir
2007	Ghost Rider	Mark Steven Johnson
2010	The Way Back	Peter Weir

=== Television ===
Year	Title	Director	Notes
1972	The Spoiler		
1972	The Marty Feldman Show	Brian Trenchard-Smith	TV special
1975	CBS Children's Film Festival	Bert Salzman	Episode "Me and You, Kangaroo"
1981	A Town Like Alice	David Stevens	Miniseries
1986	The Challenge	Chris Thomson	3 episodes
2012	Watch with Mother	Paul Bruty; The Glue Society	2 episodes

TV movies

Year	Title	Director
1976	Is There Anybody There?	Peter Maxwell
1977	The Alternative	Paul Eddey
1977	Mama's Gone A-Hunting	Peter Maxwell
1977	Benny Hill Down Under	Rod Kinnear; Richard McCarthy
1978	Gone to Ground	Kevin James Dobson
1978	The Night Nurse	Igor Auzins
1978	Plunge Into Darkness	Peter Maxwell
1985	The Perfectionist	Chris Thomson

Documentary film

Year	Title	Director	Notes
1979	New South Wales Images	Himself	With John Seale

== Awards and recognition ==
Boyd has been a member of the Australian Cinematographers Society (ACS) since 1975, and was inducted into their Hall of Fame in 1998.

In 2004, he became a member of the American Society of Cinematographers (ASC).

In 1988, Boyd became the first of the only two cinematographers to receive the Australian Film Institute's Raymond Longford Award, recognising his "unwavering commitment over many years to excellence in the film and television industries".

In 2021, he was appointed an Officer of the Order of Australia for "distinguished service to the visual arts as a cinematographer of Australian feature films and television productions" in the Queen's Birthday Honours.

=== Major awards ===
Year	Award	Category	Title	Result
1975	BAFTA Awards	Best Cinematography	Picnic at Hanging Rock	Won
2003	BAFTA Awards	Best Cinematography	Master and Commander: The Far Side of the World	Nominated
2003	Academy Awards	Best Cinematography	Master and Commander: The Far Side of the World	Won
2003	American Society of Cinematographers	Outstanding Achievement in Cinematography	Master and Commander: The Far Side of the World	Nominated

=== Australian awards ===
Australian Film Institute Awards

Year	Award	Title	Result
1977	Best Cinematography	Break of Day	Won
1978	Best Cinematography	The Last Wave	Won
1980	Best Cinematography	The Chain Reaction	Nominated
1983	Best Cinematography	The Year of Living Dangerously	Nominated
1986	Best Cinematography	Burke & Wills	Nominated
1988	Raymond Longford Award		Won
1990	Best Cinematography	Blood Oath	Nominated

Australian Cinematographers Society

Year	Award	Title	Result
1976	Cinematographer of the Year	Between Wars	Won
1982	Cinematographer of the Year	Gallipoli	Won
1998	Hall of Fame Award		Won

=== Other awards ===
Year	Award	Category	Title	Result
1976	British Society of Cinematographers	Best Cinematography	Picnic at Hanging Rock	Nominated
1979	Saturn Awards	Best Cinematography	Picnic at Hanging Rock	Won
2002	FCCA Award	Special Achievement Award		Won
2003	Camerimage	Special Award for Duo Cinematographer-Director	Master and Commander: The Far Side of the World	Won
2003	Camerimage	Golden Frog	Master and Commander: The Far Side of the World	Nominated
2003	Satellite Awards	Best Cinematography (shared with Sandi Sissel on second unit)	Master and Commander: The Far Side of the World	Nominated
2005	Kodak Awards	Excellence in Cinematography		Won
