= Bruce A. Wishart =

Australian actor and writer

Bruce A. Wishart is an Australian writer and actor, best known for his work in TV movies for Robert Bruning.

== Select credits ==
- The Passionate Pianist (1957) (TV play) - actor only
- Off the Beach (1959) (musical revue)
- Further Off the Beach (1959) (musical revue)
- Late Night Revue (1959) (musical revue)
- The Terrific Adventures of the Terrible Ten (1960) (TV series)
- Homicide (1970–71) (TV series)
- Paradise (1975) (TV movie)
- Is There Anybody There? (1976) (TV movie)
- Mama's Gone A-Hunting (1977) (TV movie)
- Gone to Ground (1977) (TV movie)
- Glenview High (1977) (TV series)
- Chopper Squad (1978) (TV movie)
- The Newman Shame (1978) (TV movie)
- Image of Death (1978) (TV movie)
- Plunge Into Darkness (1978) (TV movie)
- Demolition (1978) (TV movie)
- Cop Shop (1980) (TV series)
