= Is There Anybody There? (film) =

- Directed by: Peter Maxwell
- Written by: Bruce A. Wishart
- Produced by: Robert Bruning executive David Hannay
- Starring: Wendy Hughes; George Lazenby; Charles Tingwell
- Cinematography: Russell Boyd
- Edited by: Colin Waddy
- Music by: Bob Young
- Production company: Gemini Productions
- Distributed by: Paramount
- Release dates: 24 June 1976 (Melbourne) 11 August 1976 (Sydney)
- Running time: 74 mins
- Country: Australia
- Language: English
- Budget: $90,000

Is There Anybody There? is a 1976 Australian TV movie directed by Peter Maxwell and produced by Robert Bruning. It has been called the first colour tele movie made in Australia and its success led to Bruning being commissioned to make a series of TV movies, including The Newman Shame which also starred Lazenby.

== Synopsis ==
A fragile woman, Kate, is released from a sanatorium run by a man called Redwood into the arms of her husband John. While she was away John has begun an affair with Kate's sister Marianne.

The two sisters live together in an apartment block while John is away, and find themselves stalked by some mysterious strangers, Rosa and Duncan.

Marianne believes that she is being confused with Kate - but it turns out the whole thing is a plot by Kate to revenge herself on Marianne and John.

Marianne accidentally shoots John to death and then Kate shoots Marianne and escapes with John's money and her lover, Duncan - who has murdered Rosa.

== Cast ==
- George Lazenby as John
- Wendy Hughes as Marianne Dickinson
- Tina Grenville as Kate
- Charles Tingwell as Redwood
- Patrick Ward as Duncan
- Chantal Contouri as Rosa
- Enid Lorimer
- Gordon McDougall
- Stuart Wagstaff
- Robert Bruning

== Production ==
Robert Bruning had previously made a TV movie for Channel 9 called Paradise (1975) which he later called "terrible". That was a pilot for a series that never eventuated; Bruning calls this film "the first of the true-all film tele features". It was the first of an initial order of four films for Channel Seven made through Bruning's Gemini Productions.

"There is no way it will develop into a series," said Bruning of the movie. "It was written and produced as a complete feature."

The film was shot in Sydney.

== Reception ==
=== Critical ===
A writer from the Sydney Morning Herald praised the "superb cast" and said the story had them "on the edge of my seat, horrifically hypnotised."

=== Ratings ===
The film rated very well on Channel 7 and was picked up by Paramount to distribute internationally.

The success of the film enabled Bruning to make a series of TV movies for Australian TV. In particular, Channel 7 bought three more movies off Bruning, Mama's Gone A-Hunting (1977), The Alternative (1977) and Gone to Ground (1977).

Bruning later sold Gemini to Grundy Productions and the film would be the first in a series of eleven telemovies from Grundys that were syndicated.

=== Awards ===
Bob Young's score won a Sammy Award for Best Theme music in 1976.
