= Michael Laurence =

Australian actor

- Born: 24 November 1935
- Died: 23 March 2015 (aged 79)
- Occupations: Actor; producer; director; screenwriter

Michael Laurence (24 November 1935 – 23 March 2015) was an Australian actor, producer, director and screenwriter. He will be best remembered for creating and writing the original TV mini series Return to Eden.

== Biography ==
He began his career as a child actor on Sydney radio, before winning a scholarship at 18 to the London Academy of Music and Dramatic Art, before appearing in theatre productions, including everything from Shakespearean roles to musicals.

He created, directed and starred in the Nine Network production The Godfathers, which won the Logie Award for Best Comedy in 1971.

He worked on the popular serial Number 96, and other successful miniseries including the children's series The Lost Islands, a 22-part story on Network Ten, Which Way Home, The Last Frontier and Shadow of the Cobra. His work, including more than 200-hour of commercial television, was sold to numerous countries.

== Select credits ==
- Homicide (1966) - episode "The Black Book" - actor
- On the Hop (1967) - TV play
- Color Me Dead (1969) - actor
- Squeeze a Flower (1970) - actor
- The Long Arm (1970) - episode "Only a Wave Away" - actor
- The Phallic Forest (1970) (short)-actor
- The Godfathers (1971–72) - TV series - writer (all episodes)
- The Spoiler (1972) - episode "Bye Bye Baby" - actor
- Crisis (1972) (TV movie) - writer
- The People Next Door (1973) - creator, writer
- The Love Epidemic (1975) - co-writer, actor
- The Lost Islands (1976) - writer, creator, producer
- Number 96 - various episodes as writer
- The Young Doctors - writer
- People Like Us (1980) - writer, producer
- Return to Eden (1983) - mini series - writer, co-producer
- The Last Frontier (1986) - mini series
- Shadow of the Cobra (1989) - writer
- Which Way Home (1991) - TV movie - writer
