= Carmen Duncan =

Australian actress and activist (1942–2019)

- Carmen Duncan in Harlequin (1980)
- Born: Carmen Joan Duncan; 7 July 1942; Cooma, New South Wales, Australia
- Died: 3 February 2019 (aged 76); Sydney, New South Wales, Australia
- Education: National Institute of Dramatic Art
- Occupations: Actress and activist
- Years active: 1960–2019
- Children: 2
- Family: Paula Duncan (sister)

Carmen Joan Duncan (7 July 1942 – 3 February 2019) was an Australian actress and activist, with a career locally and internationally that spanned over 50 years. She was nominated for an AFI/AACTA Award for Best Actress in a Leading Role for her performance in the film Harlequin (1980), and was also known for her role as Iris Wheeler on the American soap opera Another World from 1988 to 1994

== Early life ==
Duncan was born in Lismore in 1942, and grew up in Cooma, New South Wales, Her family moved to Double Bay in Sydney in the late 1950s, where she graduated from the National Institute of Dramatic Art (NIDA) in 1961.

== Career ==
Duncan was known to Australian audiences as a character actress in television, stage and film, as well as having appeared in television commercials.

Duncan relocated to England early in her career, spending the 1960s in London and the UK appearing in weekly repertory theatre. She went on to play the lead in Make Me a Widow in the West End. She was nominated for Best Actress at the Theatre Critics Award for her role as Meg in the National Theatre's tour of A Man for All Seasons, before winning the award a few years later for her role in After the Fall. She went on to appear in numerous theatre roles in Australia, between 1970 and 2015.

When Duncan returned to Australia, she starred in several television series, including The Battlers, You Can't See 'Round Corners, Delta and Hunter, the latter in 1967. In 1973, she played Helen Sheridan in evening soap opera Number 96 for several months. She left the series when she was pregnant with her second child and Jill Forster took over the role.

In the early 1970s, Duncan's younger sister Paula followed her into acting. However they only ever worked together once, in an episode of Cop Shop.

A role on the soap Certain Women followed. Duncan later had an ongoing role in Skyways, and guest starred in several episodes of A Country Practice as Terence Elliott's wife, Rowena.

Her film roles included Touch and Go (1980) and Run, Chrissie, Run! (1984). She was nominated for the Australian Film Institute Award for Best Actress for her role as Sandra Rast in 1980 horror film Harlequin. She also starred in 1982 Ozploitation film Turkey Shoot (1982) and later, its 2014 reboot.

Duncan emigrated to the United States in the 1980s, where she acted on television. From October 1988 to September 1994, she portrayed Iris Carrington Wheeler on long-running American daytime soap opera Another World. She succeeded Beverlee McKinsey in the role after a long absence. Many of her critics, including TV Guide's Michael Logan, remarked that her accent sounded less American than her counterparts, making her seem out of place in the serial. As an actress, she generally used a Cultivated Australian accent, which is similar to Received Pronunciation.

After leaving the Another World role in the mid-1990s, Duncan returned to Australia, where she acted in guest roles on television series including All Saints, Water Rats, Farscape, Head Start, Something in the Air, Always Greener. She also lampooned her former soap opera image on television commercials.

In 2003, Duncan appeared as Anna Denton on CrashBurn. In 2004, she returned to the United States to fill in for Eileen Fulton as Lisa Grimaldi in three episodes of As the World Turns, while Fulton was on emergency medical leave. Back in Australia, she later appeared in Winners & Losers and Pulse.

Duncan became a member of Actors Equity in 1962 and the federal council of the Media, Entertainment and Arts Alliance.

== Activism ==
Duncan retired from acting in 2006 and became a fundraising manager for the GO Fund, a New South Wales charity associated with gynaecological cancer. She served as an ambassador for the Breast Care Centre at the Royal Hospital for Women.

== Personal life ==
Duncan lived in Sydney. She was married to Norman Barrett (who went by the name of 'Adrian') in 1968. Together, they had two children – a son and a daughter. The couple split in 1984. Through her children, Duncan had three grandchildren, living in Sydney and Darwin.

Duncan's younger sister is fellow actress Paula Duncan.

== Death ==
In 2000, Duncan was diagnosed and treated for early stage breast cancer. She later also developed bowel and thyroid cancer and eventually succumbed to vaginal cancer, a rare gynaecological cancer. She died in hospital in Sydney, on 3 February 2019, aged 76.

== Filmography ==
=== Film ===
Year	Title	Role	Notes
1966	Don't Let It Get You	Judith Beech	
1967	Is Anybody Doing Anything About It?	Herself	Short
1969	You Can't See 'round Corners	Myra Neilson	
1970	Strange Holiday	Castaway Nurse Kate	
1978	Cries From a Cold Aquarium		Short
1980	Harlequin	Sandra Rast	
1980	Touch and Go	Millicent	
1982	Turkey Shoot	Jennifer	
1982	Now and Forever	Astrid Bonner	
1983	Platypus Cove	Margaret Davis	
1984	Run, Chrissie, Run!	Eve	
1984	The Gamble	Liz	Short
1985	Bootleg	Rita	
1995	Frailejon	Mother Narration	Short
1997	Allie & Me	Poppy	
2003	Liquid Bridge	Vera McCallum	
2008	Forget Me Not	Shelly	Short
2010	The Bris	Rita	Short
2013	Truth Is...	Mum	Short
2014	Turkey Shoot	President Sheila Farr	Remake of 1982 film
2016	Veov Drive	Melody Day	Short
2018	Hotel Mumbai	Lady Wynn	

=== Television ===
Year	Title	Role	Type
1963	The Hungry Ones		Regular role
1966–67	Nice 'n Juicy	Rosie Withers	2 episodes
1966–73	Homicide	Barbara Scott / Sally Trevor / Gail Fisher	3 episodes
1967	Hunter	Rosie Glow	3 episodes
1967	You Can't See 'Round Corners	Myra Neilson	4 episodes
1967	Australian Playhouse		1 episode
1968	The Battlers		1 episode
1969	Ready When You Are, C.B.		Teleplay
1969	A Christmas Carol		Teleplay
1969	Riptide	Professor Karen Shaw / Kate Brett	2 episodes
1969	Delta	Diane	1 episode
1969	Division 4	Irene Daly	1 episode
1970	The Link Men	Carol Crane	1 episode
1972	Matlock Police	Lisa King	1 episode
1972	The Spoiler	Marie	13 episodes
1973	Catch Kandy	Mrs. Wayne	9 episodes
1973	And Millions Will Die!	Jill Brennan	TV movie
1973	Ryan	Anne	1 episode
1973	Number 96	Helen Sheridan / Helen Sheridan Sellars	15 episodes
1974	The Evil Touch	Girl	1 episode
1974–75	Certain Women	Beth Pearson	7 episodes
1975	Something Special		1 episode
1976	Jackson High		TV pilot
1976	Mama's Gone A-Hunting	Helena Stevens	TV movie
1977	Hotel Story	Regular role:	6 episodes
1978	Chopper Squad	Gary's wife	1 episode
1978–81	Cop Shop	Meredith Wade / Carla Hauser / Kim Morgan	6 episodes
1979	A Place In the World		TV miniseries, 2 episodes
1979	The Young Doctors	Sylvia Marcus	3 episodes
1979	Skyways	Elaine MacFarlane	30 episodes
1981	Intimate Strangers	Elodie	TV miniseries, 2 episodes
1982; 1986	A Country Practice	Rowena Elliott	14 episodes
1983	Les traqués de l'an 2000		
1983	Skin Deep	Vanessa Corey	TV movie
1984	Special Squad	Lorraine	1 episode
1984	Super Sleuth	Margaret Little	TV movie
1985	Stock Squad		TV movie
1986	Body Business	Cassie Fairchild	TV miniseries
1987	The Flying Doctors	Jan Buchanan	1 episode
1987	Rafferty's Rules	Stella Samuels	1 episode
1988–94	Another World	Iris Wheeler	
1995	Frailejón		
1996	Women: Stories of Passion	Faith	1 episode
1998	Pacific Drive	Guest role:	1 episode
2000	The Lost World	Kayla	1 episode
2000	All Saints	Elizabeth Wallace	1 episode
2000	Ihaka: Blunt Instrument	Mrs. Renton	TV movie
2000; 2002	Farscape	Leslie Crichton	2 episodes
2001	Water Rats	Geraldine St. Clare	1 episode
2001	Head Start	Ellen	TV miniseries, 1 episode
2001	Something in the Air	Margaret Jenkins	3 episodes
2002	Counterstrike	President Elinor Shaw	TV movie
2002	The Junction Boys	Mary Harmon	TV movie
2003	Always Greener	Antonia Jones	1 episode
2003	CrashBurn	Anna Denton	13 episodes
2004	As the World Turns	Lisa Grimaldi	3 episodes
2011–12	Winners & Losers	Prof Kerry Green	10 episodes
2016	Ash vs Evil Dead	Lillian Pendergrass	1 episode
2017	Pulse	Nora Johns	1 episode

== Stage credits ==
Year	Title	Role	Type
1960	The Life of the Insects	Clytie / Sixth Moth	UNSW with NIDA
1960	Gammer Gurton's Needle	Scrapetrifte	UNSW with NIDA
1961	Peer Gynt	Ingrid	The New Auditorium, Kensington with AETT / NIDA
1961	The Strangest Kind of Romance	The Landlady	UNSW
1961	The Beggar's Opera	Mrs. Coaxer	UNSW with AETT / NIDA
1961	The Imaginary Invalid	Toinette the maid	UNSW with AETT / NIDA
1962	A Man for All Seasons	Meg	Palace Theatre, Sydney, Union Hall, Adelaide
1962	Write Me a Murder		Palace Theatre, Sydney with AETT
1963	The Playboy of the Western World		UNSW Old Tote Theatre, Sydney
1963	Make Me a Widow	Lead role	West End, London
1963	Hamlet		
1965	After the Fall		Independent Theatre, Sydney
1966	Cactus Flower		Comedy Theatre, Melbourne, Theatre Royal Sydney with J. C. Williamson's
1967	The Dance of Death		Independent Theatre, Sydney
1967	The Cocktail Party		Independent Theatre, Sydney
1967	Getting Married		Independent Theatre, Sydney, Playhouse Canberra
1970	Lunchtime		AMP Theatrette, Sydney with Q Theatre Company / The Theatre Group
1971	A Scent of Flowers		
1972	Birds on the Wing		Macleay Theatre, Sydney
1973	A Patriot for Me		Independent Theatre, Sydney
1973	Cat on a Hot Tin Roof		
1974	Romeo and Juliet		
1975	The Austral Muse		Nimrod Theatre, Sydney with Artists' Co-operative Theatre
1975	Down Under		Stables Theatre, Sydney with King O'Malley Theatre Company
1977	Next		St James Playhouse, Sydney with Lunchtime Playhouse
1977	Lovers		Plaza Cinema, Sydney with Lunchtime Playhouse
1978	Bedroom Farce		Theatre Royal Sydney, Her Majesty's Theatre, Melbourne with Peter Williams Productions / AETT
1981	Cat on a Hot Tin Roof	Maggie	SGIO Theatre, Brisbane with QTC
1983	Top Girls	Marlene	Nimrod Theatre, Sydney
1987	Blithe Spirit	Elvira	Sydney Opera House, Glen St Theatre, Sydney, Canberra Theatre, Newcastle Civic Theatre with Forest Theatre Company
2001	On Approval		Glen St Theatre, Sydney
2013	A Murder is Announced	Mrs Swettenham	Sydney Theatre, Comedy Theatre, Melbourne
2015	The Credeaux Canvas	Tess	Seymour Centre, Sydney
2015	Anything Goes	Evangeline Harcourt	Princess Theatre, Melbourne, Lyric Theatre, Brisbane, Sydney Opera House with Gordon Frost Organisation

== Awards and nominations ==
Year	Work	Award	Category	Result	Ref.
1962	A Man for All Seasons	Theatre Critics Awards	Best Actress	Nominated	
1965	After the Fall	Theatre Critics Awards	Best Actress	Won	
1980	Harlequin	Australian Film Institute Awards	Best Actress in a Leading Role	Nominated	
1980	Harlequin	Penguin Awards	Best Actress	Nominated	
1980	Touch and Go	Penguin Awards	Best Actress	Nominated	
1990	Another World	Soap Opera Digest Awards	Outstanding Female Newcomer: Daytime	Nominated	
1992	Another World	Soap Opera Digest Awards	Outstanding Villainess: Daytime	Nominated	
