= Up The Convicts =

- Written by: Hugh Stuckey
- Starring: Frankie Howerd; Frank Thring; Wallas Eaton; Carol Raye; Lee Young
- Country of origin: Australia
- Original language: English
- No. of seasons: 1
- No. of episodes: 4

Production
- Running time: 50 minutes

Original release
- Network: ATN-7
- Release: February 18 – August 8, 1976

Up The Convicts is an Australian comedy television series that aired on Channel 7 in 1976. It starred Frankie Howerd as a convict in Botany Bay in the 18th century. There was four episodes, each billed as specials. It was a similar style of show as Howerd's Up Pompeii!.

== Cast ==
- Frankie Howerd as Jonathan Shirk
- Frank Thring as Sergeant Bastion
- Wallas Eaton as Sir Montague Fitzgibbon
- Carol Raye as Lady Fitzgibbon
- Lee Young as Quinney
- Abigail as Charlotte
- Kate Fitzpatrick
- Anne Lambert as Gladys
- Jacki Weaver as Emily
- Crystal Redenko as Dapne
- Patrick Ward as Roger
- Arna-Maria Winchester
