= Joan Bruce =

British actress (1928–2014)

- Born: Joan Olive Thompson; 29 February 1928; Surrey, England
- Died: 26 April 2014 (aged 86); Central Coast, New South Wales, Australia
- Education: London Academy of Music and Dramatic Art
- Occupation: Actress
- Years active: 1948–1988
- Spouses: Frank Baden-Powell (1954–?); Kenneth Williams (1978–2014; his death)
- Children: 2

Joan Olive Bruce (née Thompson; 29 February 1928 – 26 April 2014) was a British actress who appeared in theatre, radio, television and film.

Bruce was best known for her role in the television series Certain Women (1974-1977) and for voicing the Kangaroo in the children's animation live action film Dot and the Kangaroo (1977)

== Biography ==
Bruce was born as Joan Thompson in Surrey, England to George and Olive Thompson and took her stage name after her maternal grandmother.

She trained at the London Academy of Music and Dramatic Art, before launching her performance career in repertory theatre in northern England from 1948, after marrying first husband actor, director, stage manager and theatre entrepreneur Frank Baden-Powell. They immigrated the following year to Australia and toured Oceania with the Australian Elizabethan Theatre Trust in plays Separate Tables and Sleeping Prince, with her husband taking on the role of stage manager and Bruce acting.

After returning to Perth to give birth to her daughters, she appeared in plays The Anniversary, Entertaining Mr. Sloane and Who's Afraid of Virginia Woolf?. Lauded for her performances, she was considered one of Perth's finest actors. In Adelaide she featured in the production of Patrick White's The Ham Funeral, and was awarded as actress of the year. Before taking the show to Sydney, she also was in the cast of Night on Bald Mountain, another play by Patrick White, before moving with her daughters to Sydney in 1968, and spending the next ten years working numerously including roles in The Entertainer, Travelling North, Heartbreak House, The Life and Times of Nicholas Appelby and Something Afoot.

Bruce was best known for her role in the television series Certain Women and for voicing the Kangaroo in the children's animation/live film Dot and the Kangaroo

She married her second husband Kenneth William in 1978, and subsequently appeared on television in guesting roles in series Chopper Squad and A Country Practice.

She retired in 1988 and died several weeks after her husband on the New South Wales Central Coast in April 2014, aged 86.

== Filmography ==
Films

Year	Title	Role	Type
1962	The Good Oil	Role unknown	TV film
1974	Lindsay's Boy	Role unknown	TV film
1976	Is There Anybody There?	Jamie	TV film
1977	Dot and the Kangaroo	The Kangaroo / Mother (Voice)	Feature animated film
1978	The Newman Shame	Betty Newman	TV film
1981	Film Continuity	Herself - Performer	Short documentary film
1982	Sarah and the Squirrel	Voice	Animated TV film
1982	Brothers	Mrs. Williams	Feature film, NZ
1987	The Facts of Life Down Under	Mrs. Winters	TV film (US/Australia)

TV series

Year	Title	Role	Type
1967-1968	In Perth Tonight	Presenter	TV series
1971;1972	Homicide	Marge Hayes / June Hutchinson	TV series, 2 episodes
1972	Division 4	Mrs. Davies	TV series, 1 episode
1972;1973	Matlock Police	Gladys Turner / Betty	TV series, 2 episodes
1973-1976	Certain Women	Jane Stone	TV series, 166 episodes
1976	The Emigrants	Peggy Nicholls	TV series (UK/Australia), 1 episode
1978	Glenview High	Guest role	TV series, 1 episode
1978	Chopper Squad	Mrs. Hayle	TV series, 1 episode: "A Dream Before Dying"
1979	Doctors Down Under	Sister Cummings	TV series, 8 episodes
1980	Cop Shop	Mrs. Keen	TV series, 1 episode
1980	The Mike Walsh Show	Guest - Herself	TV series, 1 episode
1983	A Country Practice	Daisy Hatfield	TV series, 2 episodes
1987	Melba	Mrs. Doyle	TV miniseries, 2 episodes
1988	The True Believers	Pattie Menzies	TV miniseries, 7 episodes
