= The Bushranger (1976 film) =

1976 television film directed by Federico Chentrens

- Based on: The Wanted Dead by Kenneth Cook
- Written by: Margaret Pomeranz
- Directed by: Federico Chentrens
- Starring: Leonard Teale; John Hamblin; Kate Fitzpatrick; Liz Harris
- Country of origin: Australia
- Original language: English

Production
- Producer: Federico Chentrens
- Cinematography: Oscar Scherl
- Running time: 85 mins
- Production company: Fedra Film

Original release
- Network: Nine Network
- Release: 1976

The Bushranger is a 1976 Australian TV movie.

The movie was directed by Federico Chentrens, an Italian director who came to Australia to make a TV series about bushrangers. The series was not made but Chentres liked Australia and decided to settle there permanently.

The film was based on a 1972 novel by Kenneth Cook, The Wanted Dead. The Sydney Morning Herald reviewing the book, called it "a bookful of excitement." A script was originally done by Cook and Eleanor Witcombe and was sold to the ABC who were going to make it in collaboration with an Italian company. However, this floundered after problems with Actors' Equity.

The movie was part of a nine-picture slate from the Nine network made at a cost of $2 million. Others included Paradise, The Human Target, Spiral Bureau, and Polly Me Love.

The film was shot entirely on the ranch of Smokey Dawson. The film was shown as part of three 90 minute TV movies on "Australian Film Week" on GTV-9 along with Polly Me Love and Murcheson Creek.

== Premise ==
A police inspector searches for a criminal only known as "Hutton".

== Cast ==
- Leonard Teale as 'Hangman' Hutton
- John Hamblin
- Kevin Wilson as Dermot Reilly
- Kate Fitzpatrick as Jane
- Max Osbiston
- Liz Harris
- Ken Wayne
