= Summer of Secrets =

Summer of Secrets may refer to:

- Summer of Secrets (film), a 1976 film directed by Jim Sharman
- Summer of Secrets (novel), a 2007 novel by Rosie Rushton
- "Summer of Secrets" (The Thundermans: Undercover), an episode of the American TV series The Thundermans: Undercover
