= Tracy Lee =

Tracy Lee may refer to:

- Tracey Lee (female impersonator) (1933–1990), Australian cabaret artiste and female impersonator
- Tracy Lee (actress) (born 1985), Malaysian Chinese actress and television host
- Tracey Lee (born 1970), American rapper
