= Tina Grenville =

Actor

Tina Grenville is a New Zealand actor, model, presenter and writer.

She attended Wellington Girls' College and moved into modelling becoming the 1964 Model of the Year. She also acted, in New Zealand and Australia. Her first husband went missing at sea when she was 20 years old. She was then married to Robert Bruning with whom she frequently collaborated.

She returned to New Zealand where she hosted a show Good Morning and was a panellist on Beauty and the Beast.

== Select credits ==
- The Godfathers (1971–1972) (TV series) as Elizabeth Dent
- The People Next Door (1973) (TV series) as Elizabeth Dunstan (née Dent)
- Paradise (1975) (TV movie)
- Is There Anybody There? (1976) (TV movie) as Kate
- The Young Doctors (1977) (TV series) as Cora Clayton
- The Restless Years (1977–1978) (TV series) as Louise Archer
- The Mike Walsh Show (1978) (TV series) Guest as herself.
- The Mike Walsh Show (1979) (TV series) Guest as herself.
- The Variety Club Race Day (1980) (TV Special) Guest as herself.
- Homeward Bound (1992) (TV series) as Val Johnstone
