= Tracey Lee (female impersonator) =

Australian actor

- Born: Maxwell Ritchie; 1933; Manly, New South Wales, Australia
- Died: 8 April 1990 (aged 56–57); Glebe, New South Wales, Australia
- Occupations: Cabaret personality, female impersonator
- Years active: 1953–1986

Tracey Lee (real name Maxwell Ritchie) (1933 – 8 April 1990) was an internationally acclaimed Australian cabaret artiste and female impersonator who was active from the 1950s to the 1980s.

== Early life ==
Born in Sydney in 1933, Maxwell Ritchie was the youngest of eight children of strict parents. As a Sydney newspaper reported four decades later, "as a boy of ten, little Max from Manly was one of those star-struck kids who used to paper their bedroom walls with movie star pin-ups". Reportedly attending the local cinema at Balgowlah three times a week, Ritchie became obsessed with "leading ladies of any calibre", including Ginger Rogers, Margaret Rutherford, Dorothy Lamour and Ruby Keeler. In later life, he admitted that "from a child, I'd had this talent for mimicking and miming". Ritchie's first recorded foray into female impersonation took place as a teenager, when he entered a talent quest at the Manly Theatre dressed as Carmen Miranda, and won first prize.

== Professional life ==
=== Early career in Australia ===
Ritchie initially began working as a commercial artist for a city department store, but, as he later put it, "I couldn't see myself for the rest of my life sitting in an office in the back of a store, so I suppose that's what drove me into this line of work". He commenced his career as a professional female impersonator in 1953, with an appearance at the Stork Club at Tom Ugly's Point, south of Sydney. He created the persona of Tracey Lee in 1959, while appearing at Andre's nightspot.

=== International breakthrough ===
It was actually outside Australia that Lee obtained his first big break, when, after he had "managed to scrape together enough money for a trip abroad", he travelled to Europe and appeared on stage at the famous Carrousel all-male revue in Paris. He subsequently became a member of the venue's touring company, and performed with them on the French Riviera and in Italy. Becoming sufficiently well known to embark on a career as a solo performer, Lee remained in Europe for seven years, appearing in London, Brussels, Amsterdam, Zurich, Berlin, Hamburg, Florence, Naples and Milan. These included appearances at some of the world's leading cabaret venues, including the Follies Pigalle and Drap d'Or in Paris, and Chez Nous in Berlin. In London, he performed at the Room at the Top and the Winston Club in Mayfair, where he replaced Danny La Rue for an extended season.

Lee also toured extensively through Africa. He became the first professional female impersonator to perform on stage in South Africa, and also appeared in Rhodesia, Tanzania, Mozambique, Senegal and Kenya.

One appearance in New York City was acclaimed by critic Henry Edwards of After Dark magazine, who (having already seen Lee perform in London) stated that "The man is a genius". It was also reported that actress Sylvia Miles was one of Lee's biggest fans.

During his extensive world travels over several decades, Lee met (and even befriended) some of the Hollywood actresses whom he had idolised as a child, including Judy Garland, Marlene Dietrich, Bette Davis and Katherine Grayson. Not all of them, he freely admitted, lived up to his expectations. Dorothy Lamour became a close friend after the two performed together in the United States, and she later agreed to write the foreword for Lee's proposed autobiography.

=== Later career in Australia ===
In 1967, Lee appeared at Melbourne's Lido Theatre Restaurant in a limited-season revue entitled Hello Australia. The show was billed as "the most spectacular revue in Australian theatre restaurant history", with Lee himself billed as the "controversial impressionist and singing personality from the famous Carousel Nightspot in Paris". From the early 1970s, Lee mostly performed in his native Sydney, appearing in cabaret, pantomimes and stage shows. In one notable instance, he "created a precedent on the Australian stage by playing Bette Davis as Margo Channing in the stage play All about Eve. In 1975, he was given his own one-hour television special, titled Hello Hollywood, in which he appeared with stage actress Gloria Dawn and pop vocalist Normie Rowe. He went on to perform a one-man show in the guise of actress Margaret Rutherford, in which he sang two original songs, "I like gin" and "The Tumbarumba Rhumba", that he composed himself. During the 1980s, Lee made several well-received appearances at the Bondi Pavilion Theatre, playing the female matriarchs in Noël Coward's Blithe Spirit and Oscar Wilde's The Importance of Being Earnest. His performance as Lady Bracknell in the latter play (in which he was billed as "the world famous Mr Tracey Lee") was lauded in the press as "a brilliant portrayal", in which the actor "creates one memorable moment after another".

== Retirement and death ==
By the late 1980s, Lee had retired from performing and spent much of his time working for AIDS-related charities in Sydney. In April 1989, some of Lee's movie memorabilia collection was offered as part of the Hooray for Hollywood auction in Melbourne. The auction generated interest from around the world, with actor Roddy McDowall reportedly bidding for Lee's Bette Davis scrapbooks.

Tracey Lee died almost a year later, on 8 April 1990. A brief newspaper notice stated that he was survived by six of his seven siblings and was "loved uncle to their families and beloved of his many friends". Lee's funeral took place at the Northern Suburbs Crematorium on 12 April.

The renowned Australian entertainer died from AIDS-related complications in 1990.

== Repertoire ==
Tracey Lee performed impersonations of:

- Clara Bow
- Bette Davis
- Marlene Dietrich
- Eartha Kitt
- Margaret Rutherford
- Cecilia Sisson (silent film star with a speech impediment, also impersonated by Carol Channing)

== Appearances ==
=== Stage ===
- Hello Australia (Lido Theatre Restaurant, 1967) - ensemble revue
- The Spice of Life (Doncaster Theatre Restaurant, 1970) - revue, with Gloria Dawn and Johnny Ladd
- Three's Company (Manly Music Loft, 1973) - revue, with Gloria Dawn and John Begg
- All about Eve (St James Playhouse, 1973) - as Margo Channing
- Cellar Folk (Journey's End Wine bar, 1976) - cabaret
- Cinderella (St James Playhouse, 1977–78) - as Ugly Stepsister
- An Evening with Margaret Rutherford (Playhouse Theatre, 1979) - one-man show
- Duke's Place: A Tribute to John Wayne (Coogee Comedy Theatre Restaurant, 1979)
- Blithe Spirit (Bondi Pavilion Theatre, 1980) - as Madame Arcati
- Pool's Paradise (Bondi Pavilion Theatre, 1981) - as The Bishop of Lax
- The Importance of Being Ernest (Bondi Pavilion Theatre, 1986) - as Lady Bracknell

=== Film ===
- The Set (1970) - as Theo
- Demolition (1978) - as Drag Queen

=== Television ===
- This Day Tonight (1973) - guest appearance as Bette Davis
- The Bert Newton Show (1973) - guest appearance as Margaret Rutherford
- Hello Hollywood (1975) - TV special, with Gloria Dawn and Normie Rowe
- Chopper Squad (1978) - as "Patches"
- Show Biz (1979) - interviewed by movie critic Bill Collins

== Legacy ==
In October 1972, it was reported that Lee was working on an autobiography, to be titled From Under My Wig. At the time, it was stated that several American publishers had "already shown great interest in it" and, furthermore, that one unnamed impresario had expressed interest in adapting the book as a feature film. Early the following year, it was announced that the book (now titled simply Under My Wig) would be published by the Sydney-based Angus & Robertson in October 1973. However, neither the book, nor the proposed film adaptation, ever appeared.

In later years, Lee donated memorabilia associated with his professional life, including photographs, scrapbooks and recordings of his performances, to the Dennis Wolanski Library of the Performing Arts at the Sydney Opera House. In 1997, this collection was transferred to the State Library of New South Wales in Sydney. These papers include the typescript of Lee's unpublished autobiography, under the title "I dared to be different".

A collection of photographs, newspaper clippings and programs on Lee is held by the Australian Queer Archives.

A small collection of theatre programmes and related ephemera from Lee's career is also held by the National Library of Australia at Canberra.

Queensland-based artist Libby Woodhams, who knew Lee when she worked in Sydney in the late 1980s, paid homage to him with a piece of artwork titled Four places and only one chair. Described as "a tribute to Tracy Lee, a drag queen, who did so much for the gay community", the artwork was inspired by a visit to Lee's "sparsely furnished house where, in the dining room, was a table exquisitely laid for four with lace tablecloth, glasses and cutlery - and only one chair".
