= The People Next Door (Australian TV series) =

Family Comedy Series

The People Next Door is an Australian comedy-drama television series which aired on the Nine Network in 1973. This family series is a spin-off of The Godfathers which ran for 72 episodes in 1971 and 1972 and was also created by Robert Bruning and Michael Laurence. It featured two characters from The Godfathers, Elizabeth Dent and David Milson.

== Plot ==
The People Next Door follows the story of Elizabeth Dunstan (née Dent), who is now married to Bill Dunstan and they have a baby. They move into a new house and take in Dave Milson as a boarder. Michael Laurence from the previous series also makes occasional guest appearances as Pete Fairhall.

The household next door is headed by Daniel J. Penrose, an eccentric author in his 40s, and his three children, 23-year-old Meg, 19-year-old Martin and 11-year-old B.J. Joanna Church is Daniel's publisher and manager. Daniel J. Penrose is a people-hater, forbids his three children to even speak to the new neighbours and does everything he can to scare them off.

== Cast ==
- Tina Grenville as Elizabeth Dunstan (née Dent)
- Alan Lander as Bill Dunstan
- Harold Hopkins as David Milson
- Deryck Barnes as Daniel J. Penrose
- Tina Bursill as Meg Penrose
- John Stanwell as B.J. Penrose
- Kevin Wilson as Martin Penrose
- Diana Davidson as Joanna Church

== Production ==
The People Next Door was created as a replacement series for The Godfathers. The series was commissioned for 48 episodes and began optimistically but low ratings caused the network to exercise their option to reduce the number of episodes and production ceased after 20 episodes were made.
