= The Alternative (film) =

- Written by: Tony Morphett
- Directed by: Paul Eddey
- Starring: Wendy Hughes; Peter Adams
- Country of origin: Australia
- Original language: English

Production
- Producer: Robert Bruning
- Cinematography: Russell Boyd
- Editor: Trevor Ellis
- Running time: 74 mins
- Production company: Gemini Productions
- Budget: A$105,000 or $90,000

Original release
- Release: 1978

The Alternative is a 1978 Australian television film about an unmarried editor of a woman's magazine who finds herself pregnant. She has a relationship with another woman.

== Plot ==
Melanie is an unmarried woman working for a women's magazine. She falls pregnant and decides to raise the baby on her own.

== Cast ==
- Wendy Hughes as Melanie Hilton
- Peter Adams as Noel Denning
- Carla Hoogeveen as Linda
- Tony Bonner as Peter
- Alwyn Kurts as Doherty
- Ken Goodlet as Melanie's Father
- Betty Lucas as Melanie's Mother
- Anne Haddy as Helen
- Mary Mackie as Mrs. Millbank
- Jackie Rees as June

== Production ==
It was one of a series of TV movies Robert Bruning made for Channel 7. The film was shot in Sydney.

It was the first to air after Is There Anybody There?.

He sold it to Paramount to distribute worldwide.

== Awards ==
At the Annual Penguin Awards, given by the Television Society of Australia, the film was awarded best Actress (Wendy Hughes), Actor (Peter Adams) and Supporting Actor (Alwyn Kurts), as well as Best Adult Drama.
