= Fantasy Man =

- Directed by: John Meagher
- Written by: John Meagher
- Produced by: Basil Appleby; Darrell Lass
- Starring: Harold Hopkins; Jeanie Drynan; Kate Fitzpatrick; Kerry Mack
- Cinematography: Andrew Lesnie
- Music by: Adrian Payne
- Production company: Centaur Enterprises
- Release date: 1984
- Running time: 79 minutes
- Country: Australia
- Language: English

Fantasy Man is a 1984 Australian film about a man who has a mid-life crisis and has fantasies.

== Premise ==
Nick Bailey has a mid-life crisis. His wife Liz is concerned. His neighbour Betty suggests marriage counselling. Nick fantasises in the shower about the girl who sells hamburgers near his work.

== Cast ==
- Harold Hopkins as Nick Bailey
- Jeanie Drynan as Liz Bailey
- Kerry Mack as Donna
- Kate Fitzpatrick as Betty
- John Howitt as Howard
- James Healey as Steve
- Patrick Ward as Max
- Brian Moll as Lofty

== Reception ==
The Age called it "baffling, inane and eventually tiresome."
