= Super Sleuth =

- Written by: Martin Jeffrey
- Directed by: David Wilson
- Starring: Carmen Duncan; Steven Grives; Patrick Ward; John Ewart
- Country of origin: Australia
- Original language: English

Production
- Producer: Jeremy Cornford
- Cinematography: Tony Wilson
- Editor: Warren Lynch
- Running time: 96 minutes
- Production company: Cox Cornford Productions

Original release
- Release: 1984

Super Sleuth is a 1984 Australian television film directed by David Wilson and starring Carmen Duncan, Steven Grives, Patrick Ward, and John Ewart. The screenplay concerns a group of people gathered in a secluded house murdered by a mysterious killer. The cast did not know the identity of the killer until they filmed the final segment. It was based on a concept created by Bill Powell.

The Sydney Morning Herald's Richard Coleman gave it a bad review stating "The makers of Super Sleuth obviously thought that by making it a spoof they didn't have to worry about the terrible script, hammy acting and bad production. They were right. It was beyond worrying about."

== Cast ==
- Carmen Duncan as Margaret Little
- Steven Grives as Thomas Barker
- Patrick Ward as Oswald McKinnon
- John Ewart as Steven Weatherley
- James Condon as Dennis Powell
- James Healey as James Harrison
- Elaine Lee as Harriet Barker
- Allan Penney as Douglas Hegecliff
- Susan Stenmark as Susan Mountjoy
- Megan Williams as Roberta Collins
- Sally Tayler as Sarah Clarke
- James Healey as James Harrison
