= Gary's Story =

1980 short film

- Directed by: Richard Michalak
- Written by: Marc Rosenberg
- Produced by: Rolf de Heer
- Starring: John Howard
- Cinematography: Brian Probyn; Joseph Pickering
- Edited by: Ray Argall
- Release date: 1980
- Running time: 24 minutes
- Country: Australia
- Language: English

Gary's Story is an Australian short film directed by Richard Michalak and written by Marc Rosenberg. It was produced through the Australian Film and Television School by Rolf De Heer. Adrian Martin's review in Cinema Papers said "Gary's Story doesn't pretend to be about anything other than its own existence as film, its game of trying on a multiplicity of modes and forms." The film won 1980 Australian Film Award for Best Short Fiction Film, and a Sammy Award for Best Short Fiction Film.

== Cast ==
- John Howard as Gary
- Katrina Foster as Sally
- Kate Fitzpatrick as Secretary
- Patrick Ward
