= Kate Fitzpatrick =

Australian actress (born 1947)

- Born: Nedlands, Perth, Western Australia
- Occupation: Actress
- Years active: 1967–present

Kate Fitzpatrick is an Australian television, film, and theatre actress.

== Early life ==
Fitzpatrick was born in Nedlands WA . The oldest of 5 children to an acknowledged exploration geologist father, and a celebrated artist/writer mother. She started school in Perth aged 4. When her father finished University they moved to Adelaide and she went to St Aloysius College, the same school her mother and grandmother had attended. She also studied ballet at Joanne Priest’s School. Her Adelaide grandmother had been an opera singer very briefly, and loved the ballet. Her grandfather, a doctor, was a cricket and movie fanatic who had permanent seats for every orchestral concert performed in Adelaide. From the age of 10 she was his theatre/cricket companion. At 14 she was chosen by the great painterJeffrey Smart (as Phidias in the ABC’s Argonauts) to be one of a group of students granted a travelling art scholarship to Japan. The ABC made a documentary about the trip.

Aged 15 her father was so annoyed with her exam results he sent her to be IQ tested for 4 days of the holidays. The psychologists suggested she do medicine and become a psychiatrist. At 18 she auditioned for NIDA and was accepted. She moved to Sydney, graduated and two years later returned to do the first third year course. She later converted her Diploma into an Arts Degree, and served two terms on the NIDA Board.

== Career ==
Fitzpatrick's stage roles include The Lady of the Camellias, Hamlet, Celluloid Heroes, The Ride Across Lake Constance, Shadows of Blood, Rooted, Kennedy's Children. With the Old Tote Theatre Company she acted in The Legend of King O'Malley, The Season at Sarsaparilla, The Misanthrope, The Threepenny Opera, and Big Toys by Patrick White, who wrote the play for Fitzpatrick. She appeared in Visions for the Paris Theatre Company, and in The Recruiting Officer for the Melbourne Theatre Company. She played Magenta in the original Australian production of The Rocky Horror Show in 1974. In 2017, she appeared in Cabaret as Fraülein Schneider. She most recently toured Australia in Gas Light.

Fitzpatrick's film roles included appearances in Homesdale (1971), The Office Picnic (1972), Promised Woman (1975), The Great Macarthy (1975), The Removalists (1975), The Night Nurse (1977), police drama Goodbye Paradise (1983), superhero film The Return of Captain Invincible (1983), A World Apart (1988) and action thriller Heaven's Burning (1997). In 2025, she appeared in Renny Harlin's film, Deep Water.

Her early television appearances included Serpent in the Rainbow, Birds in the Bush, Certain Women, Rush, Ben Hall, Boney, and Homicide. Further television credits included Something in the Air, Scooter: Secret Agent, Blue Heelers, Marshall Law, Always Greener and All Saints. In 2006, Fitzpatrick briefly joined the cast of soap opera Neighbours in the role of Loris Timmins. In 2009, she appeared in Packed to the Rafters in a reprising guest role. In 2010, Fitzpatrick did a short film called Stay Awake and also appeared in the drama series Satisfaction.

In 1983, Fitzpatrick became the world's first female cricketing commentator on television, when she joined the Nine Network cricket commentating team, a gamble by Channel Nine to add a more female approach to the game and attract a larger audience. Allegedly, Fitzpatrick was not welcomed with open arms by the (until then) male bastion of cricket commentators, according to Angela Pippos. Nine's tactical move, in placing a female in a cricket commentator role, was not successful and Fitzpatrick didn't return for the following season.

Fitzpatrick has also performed numerous voiceover roles, including television commercials for brands such as Aldi, Moderna, Uber Reserve and Mazda.

Fitzpatrick is a published author, essayist, and humourist whose work has appeared in numerous major newspapers and journals over the last 30 years, including a column in The Sydney Morning Herald in the 1980s.

She has had three books published, including "Name Dropping" (2004) and "Air Mail" (2005). She was a political speech writer during the 1990s, spending four years working for the NSW Arts Minister. She has also worked as a florist.

Fitzpatrick was awarded the Queen’s Jubilee Medal for services to the theatre. Artist Florence Broadhurst painted her portrait for the Archibald Prize in 1975.

== Personal life ==
Fitzpatrick has a son named Joe Fitzpatrick with French architect José Albertini. Joe, an Australian commercial real estate professional, is well known in Sydney social circles. Before her marriage, she had a two-year close relationship with Imran Khan.

In her memoir "Name Dropping: An Incomplete Memoir", Fitzpatrick also recounts having had romantic relationships with actors Sam Neill and Jeremy Irons. She lived with barrister Charles Waterstreet, between 1978 and 1982, whom she took to court in 1996 for 'deceit and breach of contract', but lost the case. She declined eight offers of marriage, including one from Australian politician Tom Hughes when she was 29.

Fitzpatrick's memoir cites friendships with playwright Patrick White, prominent legal figure Michael McHugh, theatre director Jim Sharman, English former cricket captain Mike Brearley and actor Jack Nicholson. She also details feuds with Robyn Nevin (for whom she was bridesmaid at her wedding to playwright, Jim McNeill), Barbara Hershey and feminist Germaine Greer.

== Filmography ==
=== Film ===
Year	Title	Role	Notes
1971	Homesdale	Miss Greenoak	Short film
1972	Shirley Thompson vs. the Aliens	Nurse	
1972	The Office Picnic	Mara	
1975	Promised Woman	Marge	
1975	The Great MacArthy	Andrea	
1975	The Removalists	Kate Mason	
1976	Summer of Secrets	Rachel Adams	
1979	The Audition	Roslyn	Short film
1980	Gary's Story	Secretary	Short film
1982	Goodbye Paradise	Mrs. McCreadie	
1982	The Return of Captain Invincible	Patty Patria	
1984	Fantasy Man	Betty	
1984	Skin Deep	Maggie Peters	
1988	A World Apart	June Abelson	
1993	The Nostradamus Kid	'General Booth Enters Heaven' Strolling Player	
1997	Heaven's Burning	Gloria	
1997	Emmerdale: The Dingles Down Under	Sylvia Gibson	Video
2010	Stay Awake	Mum	Short film
2017	Serving Joy	Sue	Short film
2020	The Retreat	Sam	Short film
2026	Deep Water	Becky	

=== Television ===
Year	Title	Role	Notes
1967	Bellbird	Unknown	
1970	The Rovers	Connie	Episode: "My Millions for a Meal"
1970, 1973, 1976	Homicide	Rachel Hayes-Manning / Chris Green / Bunny Rogers	3 episodes: "Peter's Party", "The Adventurer", "Bunny"
1970–1971, 1972	Division 4	Suzanne Potter / Elaine / Lorraine Hunt	3 episodes: "Marvels of Reproduction", "The Monkey Chased the Weasel", "Voice of the Gun"
1971	The Comedy Game	Airy Fairy	Episode: "Aunty Jack's Travelling Show"
1972	Behind the Legend	Nellie Melba	Episode: "Nellie Melba"
1972	Redheap	Hetty	3 episodes
1972	Birds in the Bush	Michelle	Main cast; 13 episodes
1972	The Aunty Jack Show	Airy Fairy	Episode: "Unaired Pilot: Aunty Jack's Travelling Show"
1972	Quartet	Unknown	
1973	Boney	Constable Alice McGorr	Main cast (Season 2); 13 episodes
1973	Serpent in the Rainbow	Helen Quigg	Miniseries; 4 episodes
1975	Certain Women	Paula Coburn	1 episode
1976	Luke's Kingdom	Emily	Episode: "The Dam and the Damned"
1976	The Bushranger	Jane	TV film
1976	The Haunting of Hewie Dowker	Unknown	TV film
1976	King's Men	Unknown	Episode: "1.9"
1978	The Night Nurse	Prudence Simpson	TV film
1979	Miss USA Pageant	Miss Oregon USA (as Katie Fitzpatrick)	TV special
1980	Big Toys	Unknown	Teleplay
1980	Stages: Peter Brock and the C.I.C.T in Australia	Presenter	TV special
1980	Players to the Gallery	Kate Harris	Miniseries; 3 episodes
1981	Summer Spectrum	Presenter	
1982	Runaway Island	Elene Costard	TV film
1983	World Series Cricket	Commentator	
1983	Flashback	Panelist	
1984	Skin Deep	Maggie Peters	TV film
1984; 1985	Runaway Island	Elene Costard	2 episodes
1985	The Perfectionist	Su	TV film
1986	Call Me Mister	Ingrid	Episode: "Long Shot"
1986	The Three Musketeers	Milady de Winter (voice)	TV film
1988	The Last Resort	Elizabeth Parker	Main cast
1991	Chances	Maggie	Episode: "1.64"
1992	The Resting Place	Myra	TV film
1996	Twisted Tales	Elizabeth Bishop	Episode: "Directly from My Heart to You"
1998	Murder Call	Madeleine Gault	Episode: "Many Unhappy Returns"
1998	House Gang	Astra	Episode: "Ambition"
1998	Bullpitt!	Helga Hansen	Episode: "Too Many Teds"
1998–1999	Ketchup: Cats Who Cook	Madame Courgette (voice)	
1998; 2008	All Saints	Natasha Reece / Margaret Coolage	2 episodes: "Heart to Heart", "When Tomorrow Comes"
1999	Dog's Head Bay	Trish Fairweather	Episode: "Fairweather Friends"
1999	The Lost World	Garza	Episode: "Creatures of the Dark"
1999	Mumbo Jumbo	Dorothy	TV film
2000–2002	Something in the Air	Julia Rutherford	Main cast; 320 episodes
2001	Blue Heelers	Naomi Burke	2 episodes: "The Blame Game: Parts 1 & 2"
2002	Marshall Law	Susan	2 episodes: "Mother's Day", "The Samovar"
2002	Always Greener	Chantal Wilkinson	3 episodes
2005	Scooter: Secret Agent	Taipan	Main cast; 26 episodes
2005–2006	Neighbours	Loris Timmins	Recurring; 25 episodes
2006	Mortified	Mayor	Episode: "Mother in the Nude"
2006	H_{2}O: Just Add Water	Dr. Holt	Episode: "Under the Weather"
2008	Double the Fist	Birgit	Episode: "Fist Furniture"
2008–2009	Packed to the Rafters	Marjorie Stevens	Recurring (Seasons 1–2); 8 episodes
2010	Satisfaction	Fran	Episode: "Non Standard Package"
2010	Cops L.A.C.	Meg Sinclair	3 episodes
2012	Guess How Much I Love You: The Adventures of Little Nutbrown Hare	Blue Bird / Narrator (voice)	Episode: "1.1"
2014	Guess How Much I Love You: Autumn's Here	Blue Bird / Narrator (voice)	TV film
2015	Heidi	Barble (voice)	2 episodes
2016	Rake	Judith	Episode: "4.2"

=== Video game ===
Year	Title	Role	Notes
2002	Ty The Tasmanian Tiger	Shadow of the Ghost Bat (voice)	

== Theatre ==
Year	Title	Role	Company	Ref.
1964	The Importance of Being Earnest		Old Tote Theatre, Sydney	
1968	Hamlet		STCSA	
1969	Ghosts	Regina Engstrand	St Martins Theatre Company Melbourne	
1970	The Legend of King O'Malley		Jane St Theatre, Sydney with Old Tote Theatre Company	
1971	Hamlet on Ice	Hamlet	Nimrod, Sydney	
1971	The Recruiting Officer		Russell St Theatre, Melbourne with MTC	
1972	Little Murders		Old Tote Theatre, Sydney	
1972	Shadows of Blood		Nimrod, Sydney	
1972	Rooted		Nimrod, Sydney	
1973	The Threepenny Opera	Jenny	Sydney Opera House with Old Tote Theatre Company	
1974	The Rocky Horror Show	Magenta / Usherette	New Arts Cinema, Sydney with Harry M. Miller	
1974	The Ride Across Lake Constance		Nimrod, Sydney	
1975	Ginge’s Last Stand		Nimrod, Sydney	
1975	Kennedy's Children		Nimrod, Sydney	
1975	The Importance of Being Earnest	Gwendolen Fairfax	Sydney Opera House with AETT	
1976	The Season at Sarsaparilla	Nola Boyle	Old Tote Theatre, Sydney	
1977	Big Toys	Mag	Old Tote Theatre, Sydney	
1978	The Misanthrope		Sydney Opera House with Old Tote Theatre	
1978	Bedroom Farce	Susannah	Her Majesty's Theatre, Sydney with AETT, Sydney	
1978	Visions	Madame Lynch	Paris Theatre, Sydney	
1979	The Lady of the Camellias	Marguerite Gautier, the courtesan	Sydney Opera House with STC	
1980	Britannicus	Junie	Seymour Centre, Sydney	
1980	Macbeth		STCSA	
1981	Celluloid Heroes	Maggie Murnane	Theatre Royal Sydney	
1983–1984	Insignificance	Marilyn Monroe	Playbox Theatre, Melbourne & interstate tour	
1984	Unsuitable for Adults		Playbox Theatre Company, Melbourne, NIDA Studio Theatre, Sydney	
1984	Scapin		Playbox Theatre Company, Melbourne, NIDA Studio Theatre, Sydney, Hoyts Prince Theatre, Hobart	
1985	A Spring Song	Margaret Dennison	NIDA Studio Theatre, Sydney, Playbox Theatre Company, Melbourne	
1991	Don Juan	Don Juan	Seymour Centre, Sydney	
2002	Post Felicity	Madeleine James	Playbox, Melbourne	
2003	The Fat Boy	Hope	Playbox, Melbourne for the Melbourne International Comedy Festival	
2004	Julia 3	Julia	Playbox, Melbourne	
2014	Cruise Control	Silky	Ensemble Theatre, Sydney	
2017	Cabaret	Fraülein Schneider	Melbourne Athenaeum with Hayes Theatre Company	
2024	Gaslight	Elizabeth	Australian national tour with Queensland Theatre	

== Bibliography ==
Year	Title	Publisher	ISBN	Ref.
1986	"Sydney" (with Bernard Hermann)	Hawthorn, VIC: Hutchinson of Australia	9780091571900	
2004	"Name Dropping: an Incomplete Memoir"	Pymble, NSW: HarperCollins	0-7322-7468-0	
2005	"Air Mail: Three Women Letters from Five Continents"	John Wiley & Sons Australia Ltd	1740311272	
