= The Godfathers (TV series) =

Television series

The Godfathers is an Australian comedy drama television series which aired on the Nine Network from 1971 to 1972. This family series was created by Robert Bruning and Michael Laurence, who also had starring roles.

== Plot summary ==
The Godfathers follows the story of widow Maria Varga, who decides to take in boarders into her house to help make ends meet. Her young son Mike is initially opposed to the idea and resents the new boarders until they throw him a surprise birthday party. He adopts the three boarders as his 'godfathers'.

== Cast ==
=== Main / regular ===
- Anna Volska as Maria Varga
- Ashley Grenville as Mike Varga
- Robert Bruning as Chris Johnson
- Michael Laurence as Peter Fairhall
- Eric Oldfield as Gary Peterson
- Harold Hopkins as David Milson
- Tina Grenville as Elizabeth Dent
- Eve Wynne as Mrs. Parsons
- Queenie Ashton as Mrs. Frenchman

=== Guests ===
- Benita Collings as Miss Lark (1 episode)
- Peter Whitford as Dusty Rhodes (1 episode)
- Diane Craig (1 episode)
- Max Osbiston (1 episode)
- Noeline Brown as Dina Jackson (1 episode)
- Patrick Ward as Vietnam veteran

== Production ==
Child Welfare Officer Elizabeth Dent was played by Tina Grenville, who was the real life mother of Ashley Grenville, who starred as Mike Varga.

When writing, producing and starring in the series became too much for Michael Laurence, he wrote his character Pete out of the series after 26 episodes but returned for guest appearances. He was replaced by a new godfather Dave, until the series ended at 72 episodes.

The theme song for the series was written and performed by Michael Caulfield.

== Spin-off ==
A spin-off series The People Next Door was created as a replacement series and screened in 1973 for 20 episodes. It featured two characters from The Godfathers, Elizabeth Dent and David Milson. The series began with Elizabeth and her husband Bill Dunstan moving into a new house and taking in Dave as a boarder.

== Awards ==
The Godfathers won the Logie Award for Best Comedy Series at the Logie Awards of 1973.
