= Paradise (1975 film) =

- Written by: Bruce A. Wishart
- Directed by: Bill Hughes
- Starring: Eric Oldfield
- Country of origin: Australia
- Original language: English

Production
- Executive producer: David Hannay
- Producer: Robert Bruning
- Running time: 75 mins
- Production company: Gemini Productions

Original release
- Network: Seven Network
- Release: 19 October 1975

Paradise is a 1975 Australian TV movie produced by Robert Bruning and directed by Bill Hughes.

== Plot ==
Faulkner, a private detective on the Gold Coast, investigates a murder.

== Cast ==
- Michael Beecher as Faulkner
- Tina Grenville
- Eric Oldfield
- Ingrid Mason
- Alan Wilson
- Sheila Helpmann
- George Haywood
- Donald Dale
- Peter Dair
- William Evans
- Leo Wockner
- Will Fehres
- Frank Geary
- Elaine Rees
- Pete Windsor
- Hazel Howson
- Robert Bruning

== Production ==
It was produced by Robert Bruning an actor who had produced several TV series. He wanted to move into TV movie production and succeeded in selling Paradise to Channel Nine, who were considering making it a 26-episode series. According to the Sydney Morning Herald the network hoped the film "to be a slick, glossy offering along the lines of Banacek."

It was shot in Surfers Paradise, with Bruning using several collaborators he had worked with on his TV shows such as director Bill Hughes. Bruning called the final movie "a terrible thing... I would like to forget it" but managed to sell it outright to Paramount, who showed the film in prime time syndication on American TV. It was the only one of his TV films he sold outright. Bruning's experience on the movie enabled him to make Is There Anybody There? which he called "the first of the true all-film telefeatures."

The film aired again on Channel 9 in 1976.
