= Catch Kandy =

Television series

- Genre: Children’s Adventure/Drama
- Created by: Australian Film Productions; Romie Hill
- Written by: Romie Hill
- Directed by: Gerald Turney-Smith
- Starring: Jann Ramel; Jacqueline Foley; Shane Porteous; Patrick Ward; Lyn James; Zac Martin; Peter Reynolds; Colin Hughes; Bob Lee; Darrel Martin; Carmen Duncan
- Opening theme: "Catch Kandy" performed by Lionel Long
- Ending theme: "Catch Kandy (Reprise)" performed by Lionel Long
- Composer: John Sangster
- Country of origin: Australia
- Original language: English
- No. of seasons: 1
- No. of episodes: 13

Production
- Executive producer: R.A. Cole
- Producer: C.W. Bewick Hack
- Editor: Gerald Turney-Smith
- Camera setup: Andrew Fraser
- Running time: 30 minutes

Original release
- Network: Seven Network
- Release: 1973 – 1973

Catch Kandy is an Australian children's drama television series produced by Australian Film Productions. It was shot on film in colour on location in Sydney, Australia, premiering on the Seven Network in Australia on 12 May 1973 and ran for 13 episodes. The series was later shown in the United Kingdom, South Africa, Canada, Malaysia, Hong Kong, New Zealand, Singapore and Zimbabwe.

== Plot overview ==
The series tells the story of an orphaned boy Catch Kandy and his sister Kate Kandy who, as the series begins, are living with their uncle, Earle Kandy. Their uncle, however, slips on a roller-skate which Catch left lying near stairs, and knocks himself unconscious. Believing he has killed his uncle, Catch and his sister go on the run. They end up hiding out at the Taronga Park Zoo in Sydney, living in a cave within the bear sanctuary whilst their uncle tries to track them down. They befriend a zoologist called Christian Faber.

== Episode list ==
1. The Runaways
2. Into The Net
3. Christian Faber
4. Enemy Country
5. The Bait
6. Follow The Band
7. Young Fugitive
8. Close Call
9. The Price
10. Capsize
11. Climb into Trouble
12. Man in a Wetsuit
13. Gone Astray

== Cast ==
- Jann Ramel – Catch Kandy
- Jacqueline Foley – Kate Kandy
- Patrick Ward – Christian Faber (pilot)
- Shane Porteous – Christian Faber
- Peter Reynolds – Earle Kandy
- Carmen Duncan – Mrs Wayne
- Lyn James – 2nd Mrs Wayne
- Zac Martin – Munganye
- Colin Hughes – police sergeant Lawson
- Bob Lee – policeman
- Darrel Martin – zoo kiosk attendant
- Graeme Smith – Slow Kelly
- Barry Donnelly – Fox Reagon
- Cecily Polson – Mrs James
