= Patrick Ward (actor) =

Australian actor (1950–2019)

- Born: Patrick Ward; 4 January 1950; Sydney, New South Wales, Australia
- Died: 14 October 2019 (aged 69); Sydney, Australia
- Education: Independent Theatre
- Occupation: Actor
- Known for: The Unisexers; Cop Shop; Arcade; My Two Wives

Patrick Ward (4 January 1950 – 14 October 2019) was an Australian actor noted for several performances on Australian television.

== Early life ==
Ward grew up in the Sydney suburb of Marrickville, the son of a taxi driver and payroll mistress. He left home and school at the age of 14. He worked in several jobs, before joining choreographer Ross Coleman's production of Gotta Move at Sydney's Union Theatre (now Footbridge Theatre) in 1968. At 16, he joined the Independent Theatre, where he trained as an actor, before going on to perform at the Killara 680 Coffee Theatre. At 17, he came second in a go-go dancing competition for radio station 2UW.

In his late teens, Ward was signed by Pat Woodley's modelling agency, through which he began landing roles in TV commercials.

== Career ==
Ward signed with International Casting Services run by Gloria Payten who initially secured work for him as an extra in films such Color Me Dead (1969) and That Lady from Peking (1975). At the beginning of the 1970s he also scored work in various television shows. He played Gilbert Bunthorp in the ABC's adaptation of The Cousin from Fiji, a soldier in Spyforce and a Vietnam veteran in The Godfathers. Ward played Mike Parsons in early episodes of the television series Number 96 in 1972, before later playing Nicholas Brent in the 1974 film version.

Other early roles came in police drama Matlock Police in 1973 and as Sam Wandsworth in the teen soap opera Class of '74. He played the regular role Cornelius (aka 'Corny'), in 1975 serial The Unisexers, produced by Cash Harmon Television, the makers of Number 96. However, the series was cancelled after just three weeks and 16 episodes, due to poor ratings.

Ward had a regular support role as Constable Peter Fleming in the police serial Cop Shop beginning in late 1977, but left the series within three months of its launch. In 1980 he was a regular cast member of a new soap opera, Arcade, created by several members of the creative team from Number 96. He played sports shop owner Craig Carmichael. Arcade was a critical and ratings failure and was cancelled after six weeks on air.

Further television credits included short-lived police drama The Spoiler, Catch Kandy, Homicide and sitcom Up The Convicts. He also appeared in A Country Practice (1983), Chances (1991) and Phoenix (1992) and had a regular role in the sitcom My Two Wives (1992). He later appeared in All Saints (2001), Farscape (2001; 2003) and Bad Cop, Bad Cop (2003) and Home and Away.

Ward's miniseries credits include ANZACS (1985), alongside Paul Hogan, Fields of Fire (1987) and Bodysurfer (1989), based on the short story collection by Robert Drewe. He also appeared in the TV movies Kindred Spirits and Super Sleuth (1984).

Ward also appeared in film, an early credit being 1974 cult Ozploitation film Stone opposite Helen Morse. The same year, he featured in the opening sequence of Peter Weir's The Cars That Ate Paris and then played tough guy Tex in 1975 film Sidecar Racers. Other film credits include 1980 thriller The Chain Reaction, opposite Steve Bisley, 1987 crime thriller Running from the Guns, 1990 romantic drama The Crossing alongside Russell Crowe and 1992 film Jindalee Lady He later appeared in 2008 thriller Restraint opposite Teresa Palmer, Travis Fimmel and British actor Stephen Moyer.

Theatre, however, was Ward's first love, which saw him appear in numerous stage productions throughout his career, including Butley, Summer of the Seventeenth Doll, Scapino, The Lion in Winter, Mourning Becomes Electra, Caesar and Cleopatra and Father's Day. Other theatre credits included Pyjama Tops, The Shifting Heart, The Removalists, Having a Ball, The Devil's Advocate, True West and Angel City. From 1979 to 1981 he performed in Kirribilli Pub Theatre shows. A role in Broadway musical South Pacific saw him tour Thailand in the early 1990s.

Despite landing roles in international productions including a 1981 guest role in Aaron Spelling drama The Love Boat, 1986 miniseries Spearfield's Daughter, the 1988 reboot of Mission: Impossible, and sci-fi series Farscape, Ward never had big ambitions to make it internationally.

== Personal life and death ==
Ward died on 14 October 2019, at the age of 69. He was survived by his long-term partner Alanna and his sister Sue.

== Filmography ==
=== Film ===
Year	Title	Role	Type
1969	Color Me Dead	Extra	Feature film
1974	The Cars That Ate Paris		Feature film
1974	Stone	Alistair	Feature film
1975	That Lady from Peking	Extra	Feature film
1975	Sidecar Racers	Tex Wilson	Feature film
1980	Gary's Story		Short film
1980	The Chain Reaction	Oates	Feature film
1984	Fantasy Man	Max	Feature film
1985	Warming Up	Watney	Feature film
1987	Running from the Guns	Mulcahy	Feature film
1988	A Day and a Half		Short film
1990	The Crossing	Nev	Feature film
1990	Jindalee Lady	David	Feature film
2008	Restraint	Andrew's father	Feature film
2011	Façade	Boss	Short film

=== Television ===
Year	Title	Role	Type
1972	Number 96	Mike Parsons	5 episodes
1972	The Spoiler		1 episode
1972	Spyforce	Lieutenant Wills	1 episode
1972	The Cousin from Fiji	Gilbert Bunthorp	TV movie
1972	The Godfathers	Vietnam veteran	
1972–1975	Homicide	Bruce Milford / Gary Saunders	2 episodes
1973	Certain Women		1 episode
1973	Matlock Police	Ed King	1 episode
1973	Catch Kandy	Christian Faber	8 episodes
1974	Class of '74	Sam Wandsworth	
1974	Number 96	Nicholas Brent	TV movie
1975	The Unisexers	Cornelius 'Corny' Hastings	16 episodes
1976	Is There Anybody There?	Duncan	TV movie
1976	Up the Convicts	Roger	Miniseries
1977–1978	Cop Shop	Constable Peter Fleming	27 episodes
1977–1979	Crown Court	Court Usher	7 episodes
1978	Shimmering Light	Bruce McBride	TV movie
1980	Arcade	Craig Carmichael	35 episodes
1981	Holiday Island	Greg Costello	1 episode
1981	The Love Boat	Mongala	2 episodes
1983	A Country Practice	Carl Nash	2 episodes
1983–1984	Runaway Island	Private Evans	4 episodes
1984	Kindred Spirits	Bondi Taxi Driver	TV movie
1984	Super Sleuth	Oswald McKinnon	TV movie
1985	ANZACS	Sergeant Tom McArthur	Miniseries, 3 episodes
1986	Spearfield’s Daughter	Philip Napier-Andrews	Miniseries
1987	Fields of Fire	Chook	Miniseries, 2 episodes
1987	I've Come About the Suicide	John Regus	TV movie
1988	Barracuda	Sheedy	TV movie
1988	Fields of Fire II	Chook	Miniseries, 2 episodes
1988	Rafferty's Rules	Ian 'Freddo' Frogmore	1 episode
1989	Bodysurfer	Kev Parnell	Miniseries, 2 episodes
1989	Fields of Fire III	Chook	Miniseries, 2 episodes
1989; 1997	Home and Away	Henry Whiting / Snowy James	5 episodes
1990	Mission: Impossible	Slade	1 episode
1991	Chances	Perry Bergman	1 episode
1992	Dearest Enemy		1 episode
1992	Phoenix	Blazo	4 episodes
1992	My Two Wives	Taylor	13 episodes
1997	Mirror, Mirror	Tom Potter	1 episode
2001	All Saints	Geoff Darlington	1 episode
2001; 2003	Farscape	Ralnaht / Zylar	2 episodes
2003	Bad Cop, Bad Cop	Reardon	1 episode

== Theatre ==
Year	Title	Role	Type
1973	Butley		Independent Theatre, Sydney Playhouse, Canberra with Old Tote Theatre Company
1976	Mourning Becomes Electra	Captain Adam Brant	Sydney Opera House with Old Tote Theatre Company
1976	The Lion in Winter		Independent Theatre, Sydney with The Players Company
1977	Caesar and Cleopatra	Achillas	Sydney Opera House with Old Tote Theatre Company
1977	The Unexpected Guest	Stark Widder	Genesian Theatre, Sydney
1978	Father's Day	Harold	Mayfair Theatre, Sydney, Total Theatre, Melbourne with Stuart Wagstaff Enterprises
1979–1980	The Jungle Show	Watusi (also playwright)	Kirribilli Pub Theatre, Sydney, Lulu's Theatre Restaurant, Sydney, Luke's Theatre Restaurant, Sydney
1979–1980	The Vampire Show	Igor	Kirribilli Pub Theatre, Sydney, Bronte Inn, Sydney
1981	The Private Eye Show	Joe Doe	Kirribilli Pub Theatre, Sydney
1982	The Front Page	Hildy Johnson (Herald Examiner)	SGIO Theatre, Brisbane with QTC
1985	The Removalists		Phillip St Theatre, Sydney
1985	The Shifting Heart		Phillip St Theatre, Sydney
1986	Having a Ball..!		Canberra Theatre with AETT
1988	True West		Bay Street Theatre, Sydney
1989	Angel City		Bay Street Theatre, Sydney
Early 1990s	South Pacific	Commander Harbison	Gordon Frost
1995	A Passionate Woman		Marian St Theatre, Sydney
1996	Resurrected		Lennox Theatre, Parramatta
