= Demolition (1978 film) =

- Written by: Bruce A. Wishart
- Directed by: Kevin James Dobson
- Starring: John Waters; Belinda Giblin; Fred Steele
- Country of origin: Australia
- Original language: English

Production
- Executive producer: Steve Kibler
- Producer: Robert Bruning
- Cinematography: Gary Hansen
- Editor: Henry Dangar
- Production company: Gemini Productions
- Budget: A$105,000

Original release
- Release: 21 June 1979 (Sydney)
- Release: 21 May 1980 (Melbourne)

Demolition is an Australian TV movie.

It was produced by Robert Bruning's Gemini Productions and screened on Channel 7. Director Kevin Dobson recalled it as an attempt by Bruning and Grundys "to make mid-Atlantic films for the US market. It was pretty ill-fated."

== Plot ==
British Intelligence have been conducting sound tests in different countries on techniques to increase the ability of long-distance truck drivers to stay awake - sounds were pumped into their ears to see the results. They discover that one method could completely erase memory.

An intelligence officer, Ainsley, blackmails Peter Clarke, an Australian who used to work for him as an agent, Peter Clarke, into returning to Sydney as a courier. Clarke is to take an audio tape of recordings that will erase the memory of the listener. Ainsley wants the tape to lure an enemy agent, Korcheck - the plan is to trap Korchek into listening to the tape and have his memory wiped.

An American friend introduces Peter to Faith Camden and they begin an affair.

== Cast ==
- John Waters as Peter Clarke
- Belinda Giblin as Faith Camden
- Fred Steele as Eddie
- Vincent Ball as Ainsley
- Keith Lee as Korcheck
- Donald McDonald as Henderson
- Paul Chubb as Harry
- Tracey Lee as Drag Queen
- The Don Burrows Quartet
- Tony Barry as Contact at Warehouse
- Allan Penney as Hudson
- Mercia Deane-Johns

== Production ==
Filming started in Sydney on 14 November 1977.

== Release ==
Although the film was made in 1977 it did not air in Sydney until 1979.

The Sydney Morning Herald called it "of poor quality... rather than the plot justfying itself, it seems to be an ill-constructed frame that ties together, rather clumsily, less important aspects of the film that don't stand up by themselves."

Filmink magazine later wrote:

[The movie has] a very James Bond set up, but the treatment is surprisingly downbeat and film noir-y – Waters' character gets beaten up a lot. However, the climax does involve Waters running through a wildlife safari park and stumbling into a lion enclosure, so that’s pretty Bond-y. The script is far too confusing for this to be effective.
