= Queenie Ashton =

Australian actress

Queenie Ashton AM
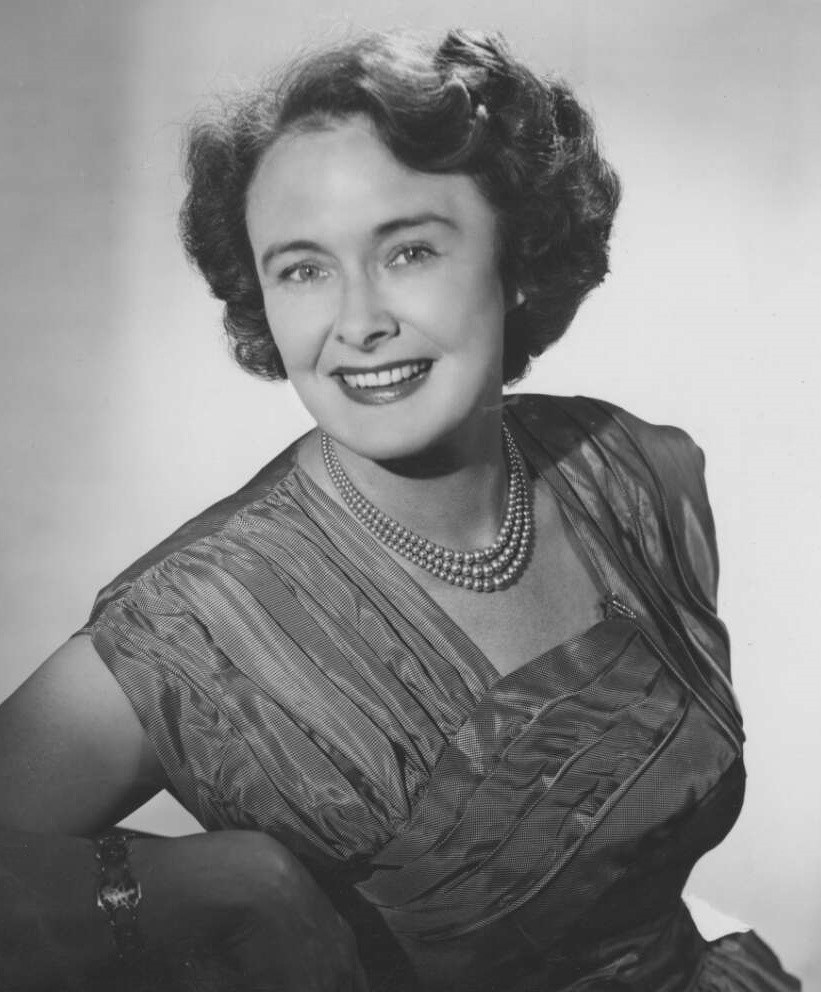
- Queenie Ashton, photographed by Noel Rubie in about 1950.
- Born: Edith Muriel Ashton; 11 November 1903; Stoke Newington, London, England, United Kingdom
- Died: 21 October 1999 (aged 95); Carlingford, New South Wales, Australia
- Other name: Ethel Muriel Cover (married name)
- Citizenship: Australian
- Occupations: Actress (television and film); stage performer; singer; dancer; radio personality
- Years active: 1917-1992
- Known for: The Lawsons (radio serial) Blue Hills (radio serial)
- Spouses: Lionel Lawson (married 1931–1940); Frederick John Cover (married 1946–1999)
- Children: 2
- Awards: Macquarie Award for Best Actress in a Supporting Role

Queenie Ashton (AM) (11 November 1903 – 21 October 1999) was a British singer, dancer, and actress, having started her career as a soprano and theatre actress in her naive UK, she had a long career in Australia as a radio and television performer, with a career spanning over 75 years.

Ashton was born as Edith Muriel Ashton in Stoke Newington, London, from 1946 upon her marriage she legally used the name Ethel Muriel Cover.

Her best known roles were in the radio serials The Lawsons between 1944 and 1949 as Lee Gordon (the wife of Dr. Gordon) and its sequel Blue Hills as the elderly "Granny" Emily Bishop, a role she played for some 27 years between 1949 and 1976. She would also play this character in the TV series Autumn Affair.

Ashton, alongside her contemporaries including Gwen Plumb, Ethel Lang, Grace Gibson and Margaret Christensen, has been described as a pioneer for females in radio. Her other prominent role was as Dolly Lucas in TV series Certain Women.

== Biography ==
=== Early life and stage ===
Ashton was born in London, England. She was an accomplished ballet dancer, and specialist in voice production and drama, and started performing when she was fourteen.

She started her career in musical comedy on the London stage, on occasion appearing with playwright Noël Coward. She left England in 1927, and performed for Dame Nellie Melba while travelling to Australia through the Suez Canal. She first appeared in Melbourne as a soprano on the concert stage, then in musical comedy, alongside such stars as Gladys Moncrieff, whom she understudied, and Strella Wilson.

=== Radio ===
Ashton featured in radio from the 1930s, appearing in musical comedy opposite Dick Bentley in Oh! Quaite. Her first straight drama role was in 1939, a period piece playing Marie Antoinette.

She played Budge's mother in "Budge's Gang", a segment of the ABC Children's Session (c. 1941–45; it was so popular it was made into a comic book). Most notably, she played the wife of Dr. Gordon and the long-running role of Granny Emily Bishop (a character many years her senior) in the radio serial Blue Hills, for the entire 27 years of the serial's run (1949–1976) Hers were the very first and last spoken parts. The final words of Granny Bishop, as spoken by Ashton, were:

We don't have to see people every day of the week/to imagine them in their surroundings or even to live their lives with them. We can still use our imagination ... they can still be in our minds. They can still be with us and so you see, and it is isn't really very hard to say goodbye. to say goodbye and God bless.

=== Television and film ===
Ashton also played the Granny Bishop role on Australia's first television serial Autumn Affair. In 1957 she appeared in a one-off television play called Tomorrow's Child and was a cast member of Certain Women (as Dolly Lucas). She was a semi-regular cast member of A Country Practice (as "Lillian Coote") and G.P. (as Mrs Sculthorpe).

Film roles included both theatrical and telefilms Always Another Dawn in 1948 and The Farrer Story in 1949, she also had cameos in Mama's Gone A-Hunting in 1977 and The Year My Voice Broke in 1987. She also appeared in many television commercials, most notably for Sara Lee. She was still performing in stage and cabaret plays in her nineties and was one of Australia's last great grand dames and one of the oldest entertainers still performing.

== Personal life ==
Ashton married Lionel Lawson, a violinist, in 1931. He became leader of the Sydney Symphony Orchestra; they had a daughter, nurse Janet Lawson, in 1933 and a son, Tony Lawson, in 1935. They divorced in 1940 and he died in 1950.

Ashton remarried in 1946 to Frederick John Cover, a theatrical agent, and founder and managing director of the actors' casting firm, Central Casting.

She died on 21 October 1999, in the Sydney suburb of Carlingford, New South Wales, aged 95.

== Selected stage appearances ==
Title	Year
Kid Boots with Leslie Henson at the Winter Garden, London	1926
Sunny as "Sue Warren" at the Empire Theatre, Sydney	1927
Rio Rita as "Carmen" at the Princess Theatre, Melbourne	1929
Whoopee! at the Empire Theatre, Sydney	1929
The Patsy (play by Barry Conners) as the nasty elder sister	1944
Anna Christie for the John Alden Company with Leonard Thiele and Lyndall Barbour	1951
A Victorian Marriage (1951 play by Warwick Fairfax)	1951
The Glass Menagerie	1961
An Evening with Noël Coward	1965
The Boy Friend	1968/1969
The Old Fashioned Show	1977
Three Sisters (by Anton Chekhov Drama theatre, Sydney Opera House)	1977
Stevie	1982

== Filmography ==
Film

Year	Title	Role	Type
1948	Always Another Dawn	Molly Regan	Feature film
1949	Strong Is the Seed (aka The Farrer Story)		Feature film
1980	Age Before Beauty	Narrator	Film short
1987	The Year My Voice Broke	Mrs. O'Neil	Feature film

Television

Year	Title	Role	Type
1957	Tomorrow's Child		Teleplay
1958–1959	Autumn Affair	Granny Bishop	TV series, 156 episodes
1959	Lady in Danger	Mrs Lamprey	Teleplay
1959	Pardon Miss Westcott	Lydia Patterson	Teleplay musical
1960	Whiplash	Miss Culbert	TV series, 1 episode
1962; 1964	Consider Your Verdict	Adelaide Upton	TV series, 2 episodes
1965–1970	Homicide	Emily Simpson / Mrs. Miriam Pinkerton / Mrs. Hamilton / Dulcie Reynolds	TV series, 4 episodes
1965	TV Spells Magic	Guest (with Max Meldrum, Ron Shand, Ruth Cracknell, Evie Hayes, Wendy Blacklock, David Copping, Kevin Miles, Gwen Plumb, Chips Rafferty & Keith Petersen)	TV special
1967	My Name's McGooley, What's Yours?	Miss Fitchett	TV series, 1 episode
1968	Hunter	Mrs. Pankhurst	TV series, 1 episode
1969–1973	Division 4	Emily Harrison / Elizabeth King / Mary Larkins / Mother O'Connell / Mrs. Wilde	TV series, 6 episodes
1969	Pastures of the Blue Crane		TV series
1971	Matlock Police	Mrs. McIntyre	TV series, 4 episodes
1971–1972	The Godfathers	Mrs. Frenchman	TV series, 4 episodes
1972	Crisis		TV pilot
1973	Elephant Boy	Doreen Graham	TV series, 1 episode
1973–1976	Certain Women	Dolly Lucas	TV series, 166 episodes
1974	The Evil Touch	Elspeth Pfeiffer	TV series, 2 episodes
1976	Solo One	Annie Robinson	TV series, 1 episode
1977	Image of Death	Mrs. Brooks	TV film
1977	Mama's Gone A-Hunting	Old Woman in Restaurant	TV film
1977	Say You Want Me		TV film
1977	The Restless Years	Jessica Metcalf	TV series, 1 episode
1978–1981	Cop Shop	Agnes Hinch / Mrs. Roberts / Evelyn Armstrong / Betty Walton	TV series, 6 episodes
1978	This Is Your Life	Herself	TV series, 1 episode
1978	The Mike Walsh Show	Guest	TV series, 1 episode
1979	Skyways	Mrs. Fow	TV series, 1 episode
1980	Young Ramsay	Dolly Farrell	TV series, 1 episode
1981	The Love Boat in Australia	Mrs. Selkirk	TV film, 2 episodes
1981	The Love Boat	Mrs. Selkirk	TV series, 2 episodes
1982, 1990	A Country Practice	Mrs. 'Coote' Duggan	TV series, 2 episodes
1983	Warming Up	Mrs. Marsh	TV film
1985	Double Sculls	Pianist	TV film
1986	Mother And Son	Elsie	TV series, 1 episode
1987	Poor Man's Orange	Mrs. Casement	TV miniseries, 2 episodes
1987	Dearest Enemy		TV pilot
1988	Rafferty's Rules	Mrs. Capra	TV series, 1 episode
1988	The Dirtwater Dynasty	Old Patient	TV miniseries, 1 episode
1989	In Melbourne Today	Guest - Herself	TV series, 1 episode
1990	A Country Practice	Mrs. Lillian Coote	TV series, 19 episodes
1991	The Miraculous Mellops	Customer	TV miniseries, 1 episode
1991–1992	G.P.	Mrs. Jessica Sculthorpe	ABC TV series, 6 episodes

== Radio ==
Year	Title	Role
1939	East Lynne	Lady Isabel
1944-1949	The Lawsons	Lee Gordon
1949–1976	Blue Hills (radio serial)	Granny Emily Bishop

== Recognition ==
In 1950 she won the Macquarie Network's award for "best performance by an actress in a supporting role" (in "Edward, My Son").

In 1980, she was appointed by her stage name Queenie Ashton a Member of the Order of Australia (AM) for her services to the performing arts.
