= Warming Up (1985 film) =

- Directed by: Bruce Best
- Written by: James Davern
- Produced by: James Davern
- Starring: Barbara Stephens; Henri Szeps
- Cinematography: Joseph Pickering
- Edited by: Zsolt Kollanyi
- Music by: Mike Perjanik
- Release date: 1985
- Running time: 93 minutes
- Country: Australia
- Language: English

Warming Up is a 1985 Australian comedy film written by James Davern and directed by Bruce Best.

== Cast ==
- Barbara Stephens as Juliet Cavanagh-Forbes
- Henri Szeps as Sergeant Peter Sullivan
- Queenie Ashton as Mrs Marsh
- Adam Fernance as Randolph (Andy) Cavanagh-Forbes
- Patrick Ward as Watney

== Reception ==
In his book Australian Film, 1978-1994 Scott Murray calls it "an often amusing tale of stereotyped sex roles and one woman's desire to change things." Penny Davies, in a review in Filmnews concludes "Australian comedy has never looked so good - Warming Up is a lot of fun." Judith Fox from the Sydney Morning Herald gave it a mixed review and noted "The story is signposted, the situations stereotyped and the humour warm and runny."
