= Tomorrow's Child (film) =

1957 television film directed by Raymond Menmuir

- Ad from 9 April 1957
- Based on: play by John Coates
- Screenplay by: Alan Seymour
- Directed by: Raymond Menmuir
- Country of origin: Australia
- Original language: English

Production
- Running time: 60 mins
- Production company: ABC

Original release
- Network: ABC
- Release: 9 April 1957 (Sydney) (live)
- Release: 26 April 1957 (Melbourne) (taped)

Tomorrow's Child is an Australian television film, or rather a live one-off television play, which aired in 1957 on ABC. Directed by Raymond Menmuir, it is notable as an early example of Australian television comedy and was Australia's first live hour long drama. It was set in the future, making it technically Australia's first science fiction drama.

== Synopsis ==
Promoted as A satirical comedy of the future, it was set in a fictional police state.

== Cast ==
- James Condon as John Worthing
- Janette Craig
- Queenie Ashton
- Mayne Lynton
- Tom Farley
- Bernard Barber
- Lola Brooks

Craig and Ashton later were regulars on Autumn Affair (1958–1959), the first Australian-produced television soap opera.

== Production ==
It was based on a 1947 play by John Coates, and written by Alan Seymour.

== Broadcast ==
It aired on Sydney station ABN-2 on 9 April 1957. A kinescope was made of the broadcast and shown in Melbourne on ABV-2 on 26 April 1957, it is not known if the kinescope recording still exists.

== See also ==
- Shell Presents - 1959–1960 series of one-off plays for Australian television
- Ending It - 1957 Australian one-off television play, based on a 1939 BBC TV one-off play
- The Passionate Pianist - 1957 Australian one-off television play
- List of live television plays broadcast on Australian Broadcasting Corporation (1950s)
