= Eric Oldfield (actor) =

Australian actor (born 1948)

- Born: 1948 (age 77–78); Surry Hills, New South Wales, Australia
- Occupations: Actor; musician; model

Eric Oldfield is an Australian actor, musician and former model, who remains best known for his role in the soap opera The Young Doctors as Dr. Ben Fielding.

TV credits include: The Godfathers, Airhawk, Chopper Squad, The Bluestone Boys, Waterloo Station, Possession, Paradise Beach, Water Rats and Murder Call.

== Filmography ==
=== Film ===
Year	Title	Role	Type
1971	Demonstrator	Driver (uncredited)	Feature film
1975	Paradise		TV movie
1976	Gone to Ground	Jimmy Fleming	TV movie
1981	Alison's Birthday	Priest	Feature film
1981	Airhawk	Jim Hawk	TV movie
1982	Island Trader		TV movie
1983	Dingo	Rod Fraser	TV movie
1988	Kadaicha	Alex Sorensen	Feature film
2000	Enemies Closer	Richard	Film
2005	Dont Say a Word	Client	Short film

=== Television ===
Year	Title	Role	Type
1971-72	The Godfathers	Gary Peterson	TV series, 72 episodes
1975	Silent Number	Patient	TV series
1974, 1975	Certain Women	Steve Williams	TV series
1975	The Dave Allen Show in Australia	Various	TV series
1976	The Bluestone Boys		TV series
1978	Father, Dear Father in Australia	Roger	TV series
1977-79	Chopper Squad	Phil Trayle	TV series
1978-82	The Young Doctors	Ben Fielding	TV series, 492 episodes
1983	Waterloo Station	Brad Stevens	TV series
1985	Possession	Gerry Foster	TV series
1986	A Country Practice	Mike Thomas	TV series
1987	The Girl from Steel City		TV series
1990	Rafferty's Rules	Tim Peters	TV series
1991	Chances	Dr Gary Duncan	TV series
1992	The Adventures of Skippy	Ranger Dave Gardner	TV series
1992	Paradise Beach	Craig Ritchie	TV series
1993	Time Trax	Ostrander	TV series
1997	Water Rats	Mr. Carter	TV series
2000	Murder Call	Shaun Brennan	TV series
