= Mama's Gone A-Hunting =

- Based on: story by Robert Bruning
- Written by: Bruce A. Wishart
- Directed by: Peter Maxwell
- Starring: Gerard Kennedy; Vince Martin; Judy Morris; Carmen Duncan
- Country of origin: Australia
- Original language: English

Production
- Producer: Robert Bruning
- Cinematography: Russell Boyd
- Editor: Rod Hay
- Running time: 96 minutes
- Production company: Gemini Productions
- Budget: $90,000

Original release
- Network: Channel 7, Sydney
- Release: 26 May 1977

Mama's Gone A-Hunting is a 1977 Australian television film. The title is taken from the English nursery rhyme and lullaby, Bye, baby Bunting. The film featured many well known Australian actors of the period, including Gerard Kennedy, Carmen Duncan, and starred Judy Morris

It was one of a series of TV movies Robert Bruning made for Channel 7. He sold it to Paramount to distribute worldwide.

== Plot ==
A psychiatric prison escapee, Elliot, and his partner, David decide to kidnap a baby and hold it for a $500,000 ransom.

The parents of the child, Joshua and Helena, go to the Sydney Opera House, leaving their child with a babysitter, Tessa. Before Elliot and David can complete the kidnapping, Tessa decides to take the baby for herself.

They chase after her to Sydney's Central Railway Station, where David is killed by a train while looking for Tessa. Tessa leaves the baby with an Old Woman in a restaurant at the station. She fights with Elliot, pushing him against a stone pylon, causing him to fall to his death.

Tessa returns the baby to its parents.

== Cast ==
- Judy Morris as Tessa Goodman
- Gerard Kennedy as Elliot Faulkner
- Vince Martin as David
- Peter Stratford as Joshua Stevens
- Carmen Duncan as Helena Stevens
- Queenie Ashton as Old Woman in Restaurant
- Greg Bepper as Bellhop
- Muriel Hopkins as Smoking Maid
- Kerry McGuire as Concierge
- Enid Lorimer as Old woman in elevator (uncredited)
- Kerry McGuire as Concierge (uncredited)

== Production ==
The film was shot in Sydney.

Bruning called it "a modern-day thriller. A great deal of the action happens around Central Railway Station [in Sydney] at night. It's a fairly exciting project." The cast included Queenie Ashton who said "It isn't a big role, but as things are at the moment I need the work."

== Reception ==
The Age wrote that "this handsome telefilm had almost everything on its side – from Russell Boyd's poetic photography and Peter Maxwell's direction to the assured acting of such principals as Gerard Kennedy and Carmen Duncan. Even the unhappy writer, Bruce Wishart, achieved verisimilitude most of the time. But the story, written in an off moment by Bruning himself, got Wishart in the end."
