= The Night Nurse =

- Written by: Ron McLean
- Directed by: Igor Auzins
- Starring: Kate Fitzpatrick; Kay Taylor
- Music by: Peter Clark; Jimmy Sloggett
- Country of origin: Australia
- Original language: English

Production
- Producer: Robert Bruning
- Cinematography: Russell Boyd
- Editor: Trevor Ellis
- Running time: 75 mins
- Production company: Gemini Productions
- Budget: $105,000

Original release
- Network: Seven Network
- Release: 5 November 1978

The Night Nurse is a 1978 Australian television film about the relationship between a former opera star and her night nurse.

It was produced by Bruning's Gemini Productions.

== Plot ==
Prudence wants to become independent of her artist ex-boyfriend Rick, and so she arrives at the grand home of The Diva, a once famous opera singer, to interview for a night nurse position. Instantly hired by the septuagenarian, she soon begins to experience odd things. And the other staff member, stone faced Clara, shows Prudence nothing but resentment, and clearly wants her gone. Prudence soon learns that all is not what it seems in this household, leading her to a ghastly discovery and to unearth dangerous secrets from the past.

== Cast ==
- Davina Whitehouse as the Diva
- Kay Taylor as Clara
- Gary Day as Rick Barrett
- Kate Fitzpatrick as Prudence Simpson
- Reg Gillam as Marsden
- Edward Howell as Morphett
- Max Meldrum as Dr Leeds

== Production ==
Bruning had made four TV movies for Seven Network which had rated well. This prompted the network to commission six more from Bruning of which The Night Nurse was the first. These were made for a cost of $750,000. "It's the largest order of locally made product ever," said Greg Brown of Seven "and we are sure viewers will be impressed."

== Reception ==
Don Groves of the Sydney Morning Herald called it "an old fashioned blood curdling thriller" and "a first rate yarn".
