= Sidecar Racers =

- DVD cover
- Directed by: Earl Bellamy
- Written by: Jon Cleary
- Produced by: Richard Irving
- Starring: Ben Murphy; John Clayton; Wendy Hughes
- Cinematography: Paul Onorato
- Edited by: Robert Kimble
- Music by: Tom Scott
- Production company: Universal Pictures
- Release date: 1975
- Running time: 100 minutes
- Country: Australia
- Language: English
- Budget: $750,000US or $1 millionAU

Sidecar Racers is a 1975 Australian drama film about an Australian motorcycle rider (John Clayton) who teams up with an American surfer (Ben Murphy) to take part in a motorcycle racing tournament.

== Plot ==
Jeff Rayburn, an American surfer visiting Australia, gets involved in the world of sidecar motorcycle racing. He becomes friends with Dave Ferguson and the two of them form a champion team.

== Cast ==
- Ben Murphy as Jeff Rayburn
- Wendy Hughes as Lynn Carson
- John Clayton as Dave Ferguson
- Peter Graves as Carson
- John Meillon as Ocker Harvey
- John Derum as Pete McAllister
- Peter Gwynne as Rick Horton
- Serge Lazareff as Bluey Wilson
- Paul Bertram as Bob Horton
- Patrick Ward as Tex Wilson
- Loretta Saul as The Girl Singer
- Bob Levy as Roger Schneider
- Liddy Clark as Cashier

== Production ==
Producer Richard Irving was a vice-president at Universal. He said he got the idea for making the film after attending a side car race in Sydney. He thought the sport "captured the Australian spirit . . . the sense of fun, a certain recklessness, energy and the desire to win" and wanted to make a film with the sport as a backdrop.

Novelist Jon Cleary was hired to write the script, an original for the screen. He says Universal were keen to make lower budgeted films aimed at the youth audience in the wake of the success of American Graffiti (1973) – although he remains unsure why they picked him to write the script since he was in his fifties at the time. Cleary decided to make the lead character a former surfboard rider because of the aerobatic skills needed to be a sidecar racer.

TV producer Richard Irving was meant to produce and direct but could not go to Australia due to an actors strike and directing duties were ultimately taken over by Earl Bellamy.

Shooting began in March 1974 with race sequences shot at the Sydney Showground and Mount Panorama. According to Cleary, Ben Murphy was troublesome during filming. "He wanted to rewrite the script, tell everybody how to act, how to produce it", the author says. "He was an absolute pain in the arse to everybody."

Wendy Hughes, who played the female lead, later said she "didn't quite get on" with Murphy and claimed the director "was very efficient, but we didn't have any in-depth discussions about character. It was left up to me, mainly. Sometimes it worked; sometimes it didn't. I tried so hard."

The movie was originally known as The Sidecar Boys.

== Reception ==
According to David Stratton, the film did "lackluster business" on its release. Cleary says that it sold well on television, however, in part because it went out on a package including The Great Waldo Pepper (1975).
