= The Perfectionist =

1981 Australian play and 1985 film

- Original language: English
- Written by: David Williamson

Premiere
- Date: September 1981
- Place: Drama Theatre, Sydney

The Perfectionist is a 1981 play by David Williamson. It was adapted into a film for television directed by Chris Thomson in 1985.

== Plot ==
The plot revolves around an academic who is working on a PhD. His wife hires a Danish student to babysit their children.

== Film version ==
The Perfectionist
- Directed by: Chris Thomson
- Written by: David Williamson
- Produced by: Patricia Lovell
- Starring: Jacki Weaver; John Waters; Noel Ferrier; Steven Vidler
- Production companies: Roadshow, Coote & Carroll
- Distributed by: Network Ten
- Release date: 1985
- Running time: 93 minutes
- Country: Australia
- Language: English
- Budget: A$1,475,000

In 1983 Patricia Lovell announced plans to produce a film version of the play directed by Williamson but they were unable to finance it. A telemovie was made in 1985. The telemovie was subsequently sold in multiple international territories, but also for television and direct-to-video.

In the United States, the film was released by New World Pictures under the title, Three's Trouble. The 1989 VHS spine identifies the genre, in New World Home Video house style, as "Sex/Comedy."

=== Cast ===
- Jacki Weaver as Barbara Gunn
- John Waters as Stuart Gunn
- Adam Willits as Shaun Gunn
- Noel Ferrier as Jack Gunn
- Steven Vidler as Erik
- Kate Fitzpatrick as Su
- Linda Cropper as Margaret Bridges
- Maggie Dence as Rosie Peters
- Sharon Millerchip as Young Babysitter
- Steve Jacobs as Lecturer
