= The Newman Shame =

- Written by: Bruce A. Wishart
- Directed by: Julian Pringle
- Starring: George Lazenby; Diane Craig
- Country of origin: Australia
- Original language: English

Production
- Producer: Robert Bruning
- Cinematography: Richard Wallace
- Editor: Ron Williams
- Running time: 87 minutes
- Production companies: Reg Grundy Productions; Gemini Productions; Swan Television
- Budget: $150,000

Original release
- Release: 1977

The Newman Shame is a 1977 Australian television film starring George Lazenby and produced by Robert Bruning who previously worked together on Is There Anybody There? (1976). Bruning made it for his Gemini Productions, which was owned by Reg Grundy Productions.

== Synopsis ==
John Brandy is an ex-cop on holiday in Singapore with his girlfriend Ginger and their friend Betty Newman when Betty's husband, Frank, calls them just before the latter commits suicide.

The three of them return to Perth where Betty is told Frank starred in a pornographic movie. Betty asks John to investigate what happened.

John discovers that Newman killed himself after being drugged at a party and found himself in a pornographic film; he was blackmailed and embezzled money to pay off his tormentors, but when the film was distributed anyway he decided to take his own life.

== Cast ==
- George Lazenby as John Brandy
- Diane Craig as Ginger
- Joan Bruce as Betty Newman
- Ken Goodlet as Frank Newman
- Alwyn Kurts as Steven Ogilvie
- Judy Nunn as Veronica
- Terry Willesee

== Production ==
Most of Bruning's films for Gemini Productions were filmed in Sydney but The Newman Shame was made in Perth with some finance from Swan TV. There was also some location work in Singapore.

Lazenby made two films in Australia, The Man from Hong Kong and Is There Anybody There? as well as appearing on TV shows. He then relocated to the US but returned temporarily to Australia to make The Newman Shame.

Joan Bruce called Lazenby "the most unprofesional [sic?] man I have ever had the displeasure to work with."
