= Backroads (1977 film) =

- Directed by: Phillip Noyce
- Written by: John Emery
- Based on: "The First Day of Spring" by John Emery
- Produced by: Phillip Noyce
- Starring: Bill Hunter; Gary Foley
- Cinematography: Russell Boyd
- Edited by: David Huggett
- Music by: Robert Murphy
- Production company: Backraods Productions
- Distributed by: Home Cinema Group
- Release date: 27 June 1977
- Running time: 60 minutes
- Country: Australia
- Language: English
- Budget: AU$30,000

Backroads is a 1977 Australian film directed by Phillip Noyce. Two strangers, white Jack and aboriginal Gary, steal a car in western New South Wales and drive around the coast. The original characters came from a story by Adelaide writer John Emery, with whom Noyce had worked on a short film. Australian reviews of the film were mixed and it opened commercially in only one cinema.

== Plot ==
Jack and Gary steal a car and head off around the back roads of Western New South Wales. They pick up a trio of fellow travellers: Gary's uncle Joe, French hitchhiker Jean Claude and embittered woman Anna. Joe drunkenly shoots a stranger and the police chase them. The police arrest Joe and Jack and shoot Gary.

== Cast ==
- Bill Hunter as Jack
- Gary Foley as Gary
- Zac Martin as Joe
- Terry Camilleri as Jean Claude
- Julie McGregor as Anna
- Essie Coffey as Aboriginal Woman
- Allan Penney as Shopkeeper

== Production ==
John Emery had written one of Phillip Noyce's short films at film school, Caravan Park, and pitched him another story, "The First Day of Spring", about a young aboriginal named Noel. They developed the script together. Gary Foley agreed to act provided that he would be responsible for the film's indigenous content.

The film was mostly shot on location near Bourke and Brewarrina in western New South Wales and was funded in part by a $25,000 grant from the Creative Development Branch of the Australian Film Commission. Shooting finished in April 1977 when the finance ran out. Noyce applied to the Australian Film Commission for money to finish the film, however he decided instead to launch Backroads at the Sydney Film Festival in 1977.

== Reception ==
The film received mixed reviews in Australia but achieved a better response overseas.
