= Image of Death =

- Written by: Bruce A. Wishart
- Directed by: Kevin James Dobson
- Starring: Cathy Paine; Tony Bonner
- Country of origin: Australia
- Original language: English

Production
- Producer: Robert Bruning
- Running time: 81 mins
- Production company: Gemini Productions
- Budget: $120,000

Original release
- Release: 1978

Image of Death is a 1978 Australian TV movie about a woman who likes to live off other people's money.

It was produced by Robert Bruning's Gemini Productions. Director Kevin Dobson recalled it as an attempt by Bruning and Grundys "to make mid-Atlantic films for the US market. It was pretty ill-fated."

== Plot ==
A woman kills her friend and takes over her identity.

== Cast ==
- Cathey Paine as Yvonne Arthur
- Penne Hackforth-Jones as Maureen
- Cheryl Waters as Barbara Shields
- Sheila Helpmann as Lidia
- Barry Creyton as TV producer
- Barry Pierce as Mark
- Tony Bonner as Carl
- Queenie Ashton as Mrs Brooks
- Max Meldrum as Gallery owner

== Production ==
Cheryl Waters was an American actor living in LA when cast. Cathey Paine was also American.
