= Kevin James Dobson =

Australian director (born 1952)

- Born: 1952; Manchester, England, United Kingdom
- Died: 21 February 2026 (aged 73); Lilydale, Victoria, Australia
- Occupations: Television and film director
- Spouse: Noni Hazlehurst (1975-1978)

Kevin James Dobson (born 1952 - 21 February 2026) was an English-born Australian and US film and television director.

== Career ==
He started his career as a film editor for Crawford Productions, then moved into directing when the majority of their police TV programs were shot entirely on color film from the mid-1970s.

In 1980, Dobson won the Penguin Award for Best TV Direction of the episode "Dreamtime" from the second season of the family adventure series Young Ramsay.

== Personal life and death ==
Dobson was born in Manchester, England in 1952. (earlier referenced as Melbourne, Australia) He emigrated to Australia with his parents under the Ten Pound Pom scheme in 1966.

He was formerly married from 1975 and 1978 to Australian actress and TV presenter Noni Hazlehurst. who appeared in a number of his productions

Dobson remarried to Susie Thurlow in the 1990s. She was born and raised in Sydney. Her father David Thurlow, a Sydney medical practitioner, engaged Harry Seidler to design a home in Blakehurst in the 1950s. After her parents separated in the 1970s Suzie lived in Hunters Hill. Kevin, Susie and their sons Harry and Jonathan, before relocating to the United States, where they resided in Pacific Palisades, Los Angeles, where he continued his TVand film directing career Kevin Dobson returned to Australia to work again in Sydney.

He died in Lilydale, Victoria, Australia from cancer, aged 73, on 21 February 2026.

== Film and television (select credits) ==
- The Mango Tree (1977) (film)
- Gone to Ground (1977) (TV movie)
- Image of Death (1978) (TV movie)
- Demolition (1978) (TV movie)
- The Last Outlaw (1980) (mini series)
- I Can Jump Puddles (1981)
- Squizzy Taylor (1982) (film)
- Five Mile Creek (1984-85) (TV series)
- Return To Eden (1985) (TV series)
- Miracle in the Wilderness (1991) (TV Movie)
- What She Doesn't Know (1992) (TV movie)
- Acapulco H.E.A.T. (1992–93) (TV series)
- Gold Diggers: The Secret of Bear Mountain (1995) (film)
- The Thorn Birds: The Missing Years (1996) (TV miniseries)
- Babylon 5 (1996–97) (TV series)
- The Virgin of Juarez (2006)
- Savages Crossing (2011)
