= Judy Lynne =

American actress

- Born: 22 July 1943 (age 82); Gary, Indiana, United States
- Other name: Judy Lind (billed as)
- Education: Northwestern University, Illinois (1961–1965)
- Occupation: Actress
- Years active: 1971–1986
- Known for: The Young Doctors as Dr. Susan Richards (1977–1980)

Judy Lynne, (credited also as Judy Lind) is an Australian former actress, journalist and reporter, who became prominent for her role as Dr. Susan Richards in the TV soap opera The Young Doctors, after leaving the acting profession in 1986, she subsequently became a hot air balloonist and businesswomen until retiring in 2007.

== Early life ==
Lynne was born in Gary, Indiana, U.S. and trained at Northwestern University, Illinois from 1961 to 1965, studying a Bachelor of Arts majoring in drama (film, TV and theatre production) and minoring in journalism. She moved to Australia in 1971.

== Career ==
=== Acting ===
From 1971, Lynne worked in Sydney, as a journalist and television reporter for A Current Affair, and as a Nine News Sydney weather presenter, while taking on television guest roles – before eventually turning to acting full time.

Lynne has had roles in numerous TV serials including Number 96 (1972), Spyforce (1972), Ryan (1973), Boney (1973) and Alvin Purple (1976). She is best known however, for her role in television serial The Young Doctors as Dr. Susan Richards, from 1977 to 1980.

Lynne also worked in theatre, and briefly as wardrobe mistress.

She left her television career in 1983, to become a commercial hot air balloon pilot, although she returned for an episode of Return to Eden in 1986.

=== Hot air ballooning ===
In 1975, as a journalist, Lynne interviewed a hot air balloonist, who was one of only four in Australia at the time. This piqued her interest in the sport, leading her to become a pilot herself. In 1980, she formed a business partnership with world champion balloonist, Peter Vizzard, starting the company, Balloon Aloft Australia in the Hunter Valley, operating commercial passenger rides, using them for advertising, and staging balloon festivals.

Lynne won the National Hot Air Balloon Championships in 1985 and went on to represent Australia in the 1985 World Hot Air Ballooning Championships in Battle Creek, Michigan, U.S. the same year, competing against Vizzard. She retired from commercial ballooning in 2007.

== Personal life ==
Since retiring, Lynne lives six months of the year in Australia, and the other six in Europe, owning a boat on the canals in France.

== Filmography ==
=== Film ===
Year	Title	Role	Type
1974	Between Wars	Woman Officer	Feature film
1974	The Violins of Saint-Jacques	Berthe	TV movie
1978	Gone to Ground	Kathleen	TV movie

=== Television ===
Year	Title	Role	Type
	A Current Affair	Reporter	TV series
1972	Number 96	Gloria Gould	TV series
1972	Spyforce	Mission Sister	TV series, season 1, episode 37: "The Mission"
1973	Boney	Carol Lund	TV series, season 2, episode 6: "Boney and the Kelly Gang"
1973	Ryan	Barbara	TV series, season 1, episode 26: "Giant, Giant Had a Great Fall"
1974	Silent Number	Tessie / Cecelia	TV series, season 1, 2 episodes
1975	Scattergood: Friend of All		TV series, season 1, episode 3: "The Great Egg Cosy Disaster"
1975	Shannon's Mob	Sophie Hochman	TV series, season 1, episode 4: "There Was a Man"
1975	The Norman Gunston Show	The Checkout Chicks	TV series, season 2, 5 episodes
1976	Nine News Sydney	Weather Reporter	TV series
1976	Alvin Purple	Meryl Sugars	TV series, season 1, episode 10: "Footy Widow"
1976	The Lively Arts		TV documentary series, episode: "In Performance: The Violins of Saint-Jacques"
1977–1979	The Young Doctors	Dr. Susan Richards	TV series, 703 episodes
1978–1983	The Mike Walsh Show	Guest	TV series
1986	Return to Eden	Nurse	TV series, season 1, episode 5: "Knife Fight"

== Theatre ==
Year	Title	Role	Type
1968	The Royal Hunt of the Sun	Cello	Playhouse Theatre, Hobart with Hobart Repertory Theatre Society
1978	Harvey		Marian Street Theatre, Sydney
