= Polly Me Love =

- Directed by: Peter Maxwell
- Written by: Ted Roberts
- Produced by: Eric Porter
- Starring: Jacki Weaver; Hugh Keays-Byrne; Max Phipps; Robert Bruning; Paula Duncan
- Production company: Eric Porter Productions
- Release date: 1976
- Country: Australia
- Language: English

Polly Me Love is a 1976 Australian film about a brothel owner's daughter in 1830.

The film was a ratings success and also sold to Canada, Europe and South America.

== Cast ==
- Jacki Weaver
- Hugh Keays-Byrne
- Max Phipps
- Robert Bruning
- Paula Duncan
- Steve Dodd
