= Plunge Into Darkness =

- Written by: Bruce A. Wishart
- Directed by: Peter Maxwell
- Starring: Olivia Hamnett; Bruce Barry; John Jarratt
- Country of origin: Australia
- Original language: English

Production
- Producer: Robert Bruning
- Running time: 75 mins
- Production company: Gemini Productions

Original release
- Release: 1978

Plunge Into Darkness is a 1978 Australian television film directed by Peter Maxwell and starring Olivia Hamnett, Bruce Barry, and John Jarratt. It concerns a couple on a holiday in the country who have a terrorising experience.

It was produced by Robert Bruning's Gemini Productions.

== Plot ==
A married couple, Gary and Pat Keating, come across a remote farmhouse containing a murdered couple and a boy. Pat stays with the boy why Gary runs for help. Gary crosses with two escaped prisoners.

== Cast ==
- Olivia Hamnett as Pat Keating
- Bruce Barry as Gary Keating
- John Jarratt as Toby
- Tom Richards as Joe
- Ashley Grenville
- Wallas Eaton
- Alister Smart
- John Ewart
- Julieanne Newbould

== Production ==
Filming was complete by June 1977.
