= Crisis (1972 film) =

1972 television film

- Written by: David Boutland; Michael Laurence
- Directed by: Bill Hughes
- Starring: Helen Morse
- Country of origin: Australia
- Original language: English

Production
- Producer: Robert Bruning
- Running time: 90 mins
- Production company: Gemini Productions

Original release
- Release: 6 July 1972 (Melbourne)

Crisis is a 1972 Australian TV movie produced by Robert Bruning and directed by Bill Hughes.

== Premise ==
Set in Sydney's Kings Cross, an open house is run by an ex-cop, a priest, a single mother and her landlady. A young girl attempts suicide. A young man tries to murder his father.

== Cast ==
- Helen Morse as Margie
- Neva Carr Glynn
- Queenie Ashton
- Diane Craig
- Sandy Harbutt
- Anne Haddy
- Gerard Maguire
- Brendon Lunney
- Derek Barnes
- Larry Crane
