= Roses Bloom Twice =

- Genre: Romantic melodrama
- Based on: story by Mike Policare
- Written by: Tony Morphett
- Directed by: David Stevens
- Starring: Glynis McNicholl; Michael Craig
- Country of origin: Australia
- Original language: English

Production
- Producers: Robert Bruning, Steve Kibler
- Cinematography: Gary Hansen
- Running time: 1 hour, 27 minutes
- Production company: Gemini Productions
- Budget: $105,000

Original release
- Release: 1978

Roses Bloom Twice is a 1977 Australian television film about a woman's attempts to begin life over again, after the death of her husband. It was written and directed by David Stevens.

It was produced by Robert Bruning's Gemini Productions.

== Synopsis ==
Most of Gemini's TV movies were thrillers, but this one and The Alternative were melodramas. The plot revolves around the character, Diana, who is widowed and must face life alone.

== Cast ==
- Glynis McNicoll as Diana
- Diane Craig as Jenny
- John Allen as Gabe
- Michael Craig as Frank
- Jennifer West
- Lyndon Harris
- Frank Taylor
- James Moss
- Reg Gillam
- Alister Smart
- Else Baring
