= Summer of Secrets (film) =

- Directed by: Jim Sharman
- Written by: John Aitken
- Produced by: Michael Thornhill
- Starring: Arthur Dignam; Rufus Collins; Nell Campbell; Andrew Sharp; Kate Fitzpatrick
- Cinematography: Russell Boyd
- Edited by: Sara Bennett
- Music by: Cameron Allan
- Production company: Secret Picture Productions
- Distributed by: Greater Union
- Release date: 24 December 1976
- Running time: 100 minutes
- Country: Australia
- Language: English
- Budget: A$370,000 or $350,984

Summer of Secrets is a 1976 film directed by Jim Sharman and starring Arthur Dignam, Rufus Collins, and Nell Campbell.

== Plot ==
A young couple, Steve and Kym, go to the beach where Steve grew up. They come across Dr Beverley Adams, who is experimenting on the brain and is working to bring back his dead wife, Rachel, to life. Rachel comes alive and wreaks havoc.

== Cast ==
- Arthur Dignam as Dr Beverley Adams
- Rufus Collins as Bob
- Nell Campbell as Kym
- Andrew Sharp as Steve
- Kate Fitzpatrick as Rachel Adams
- Barry Lovett as old timer
- Marion Johns as shop keeper
- Jude Kuring as shop assistant
- Sally Cahill as girl outside shop
- Colin Setches as boy outside shop
- Maggie Kirkpatrick uncredited

== Production ==
Jim Sharman was attracted to the script because it was a serious exploration of the Frankenstein legend.

The budget was provided by the Australian Film Commission and Greater Union. The film was shot in late 1975 under the title The Secret of Paradise Beach. Shooting took six weeks.

According to a contemporary report "everyone agrees that it is hard to explain but interesting."

== Reception ==
Summer of Secrets won several awards including the Jury and Critics' Prizes at the Academy of Science Fiction and Fantasy Films, Paris 1997
