= The Spoiler (TV series) =

The Spoiler is a short lived Australian police drama series which first screened on the Nine Network in 1972. It was created by Robert Bruning and ran for 13 episodes.

== Cast ==
=== Main/regular ===
- Bruce Barry as Jim Carver
- Carmen Duncan as Marie
- Serge Lazareff as Teddy
- Slim DeGrey as Det. Sgt. Eric Evans
- Ken Hunter-Kerr as Sir Ian Mason

=== Guests ===
- Bill Hunter as Watson
- Don Crosby as White
- John Fegan
- Judy Morris as Fancy
- Ken Goodlet
- Nancye Hayes
- Nigel Lovell as Richards
- Noeline Brown as Sandra
- Norman Yemm as Crombie
- Owen Weingott as Dr Ross
- Patrick Ward
- Robert McDarra as Joey Boy
- Roger Ward as Keith
- Ron Graham as Dave Sharpe
- Steve Dodd
