= Bruce Barry (actor) =

Australian actor

- Born: Bruce Alaric Barry; 24 October 1934; Gympie, Queensland, Australia
- Died: 20 April 2017 (aged 82); Sydney, New South Wales, Australia
- Occupations: Actor, singer

Bruce Alaric Barry (24 October 1934 – 20 April 2017 (6 May 2017 is also mentioned as a death date in one source)) was an Australian stage, television and film actor, and singer.

== Early life and career ==
Bruce Barry was born the fifth of six children of teachers Lesley Vincent Barry and Freida Ashower in Gympie, Queensland, and grew up in Charters Towers. Having started his career as a radio announcer in Queensland and northern New South Wales, Barry ventured into singing at Gold Coast nightclubs and then to acting with the Young Elizabethans, a Sydney-based theatre troupe. His first role was the title role in Henry V. In his three years there, he performed throughout Australia on various regional tours.

He then combined his singing and acting skills in stage musicals such as Funny Girl (with Jill Perryman), A Little Night Music (with Taina Elg), Irma La Douce, Annie Get Your Gun, Lola Montez, 1776, Hello, Dolly!, and Promises, Promises. He also acted in straight theatre such as Noël Coward's Private Lives (with Susannah York).

He then became a familiar face on Australian television screens, in such shows as Bellbird, The Spoiler, The Mavis Bramston Show, Skyways, The Flying Doctors, Glenview High, The Restless Years, Possession, and Division 4.

For three years from 1980 he worked in musical theatre in London, in such shows as The Biograph Girl, Marilyn! the Musical [based on the life of Marilyn Monroe, at the Adelphi Theatre; Bruce sang the role of Arthur Miller], H.M.S. Pinafore, and a long-running West End revival of Oklahoma!. He also toured the UK with Evita, appearing with Rula Lenska and others at Leeds and in other UK cities.

While living in London, Bruce Barry presented "An Evening with Bruce Barry", followed by a reception, at the Australian High Commission in Aldwych, London, under the auspices of the Australian Cultural Attache.

== Personal life ==
Bruce Barry was married and divorced twice, and was survived by two children. He died in 2017 in Sydney from complications of dementia.

== Filmography ==
=== Film ===
- Ned Kelly (1970) as George King
- Libido (1973) as David
- ABBA: The Movie (1977) as Radio Station Manager
- Patrick (1978) as Dr Brian Wright
- The Umbrella Woman (aka The Good Wife) (1987) as Archie

=== Television ===
- Skippy (1968)
- Bellbird as Michael Foley
- The Spoiler (1972) as Jim Carver
- The Evil Touch|Dear Cora, I'm Going to Kill You (1973) as Harry
- The Mavis Bramston Show
- Skyways as Douglas Stewart
- Division 4
- The Flying Doctors (1987-88)
- Glenview High
- The Restless Years as Miles Dunstan
- Possession (1985) as David Macarthur
