= Robert Bruning =

Australian actor and film producer (1928 – 2008)

- Born: Robert Bell; 27 May 1928; Dongara, Western Australia
- Died: 4 March 2008 (aged 79); Wellington, New Zealand
- Occupations: Actor and film producer

Robert Bruning (27 May 1928 – 4 March 2008) was an Australian actor and film producer, who was the founder of film production firm Gemini Productions

== Biography ==
Bruning was born as Robert Bell in Dongara, Western Australia in 1928. He worked as an amateur actor at the New Theatre in the Sydney suburb of Newtown in the 1940s and 1950s. Bruning also was a regular guest performer in Homicide, Division 4, The Sullivans and A Country Practice. He also had substantial roles on Australian films such as 1970's Ned Kelly and his production credits, on sitcoms, variety, and drama add up to more than 200 hours of television. He headlined the short-lived Ten Network produced police series The Long Arm.

Of his production career, he is notable for his creation of Australia's first telemovie, Is There Anybody There?, of which 21 more were made.

== Gemini Productions ==
Bruning set up Gemini Productions in 1971; others in the company were Bill Huges (director), David Hannay (production manager), Michael Lawrence (director) and Alister Smart (director). Its first production was the TV series The Godfathers at $5,600 an episode. They then made the variety show True Blue Show. When both shows ended, Bruning had to return to acting.

Bruning felt there would be a market for Australian TV movies like the ones Aaron Spelling made in the US. He succeeded in selling Paradise (1975) to Channel 9. Although he was unhappy with the end result, it enabled Bruning to make Is There Anybody There? which he sold to Channel Seven, and was well received. The network agreed to buy three more TV movies from Bruning, Mama's Gone A-Hunting (1977), The Alternative (1977) and Gone to Ground (1977) all made for around $90,000 each. The film was shot in Sydney.

Although the films rated well, they were deficit financed which meant Gemini was losing money. (Around this time the networks would pay $70–$84,000 for a TV movie which usually cost $105–125,000. The Australian Film Commission covered the deficit.) Bruning realised he needed the protection of a bigger company and sold Gemini to Reg Grundy, agreeing to run Gemini for Grundy for two years.

Gemini made seven TV movies in 1977 which he later felt was too many. Six were made for a cost of $750,000 and followed Gemini's initial four films. "It's the largest order of locally made product ever," said Greg Brown of Seven "and we are sure viewers will be impressed."

The films were usually shot over three six-day weeks with a week lay off in between using many of the same crew. Costs were kept down by using urban settings and locking down scripts.

Bruning died suddenly on 4 March 2008, in Wellington, New Zealand, aged 79. He was survived by his third wife, Anne, a line producer, their son Nic and three daughters from previous marriages: Ariane, Lucie and Sophie.

== Filmography ==
=== Film ===
Year	Title	Role	Type
1969	That Lady from Peking	Karl	Feature film
1970	Ned Kelly	Sergeant Steele	Feature film
1975	Sunday Too Far Away	Tom West	Feature film
1976	Polly Me Love		TV movie
1979	Snapshot	Elmer	Feature film

=== Television ===
Year 1969	Title Skippy	Role Guest star!	Type Tv episode.
1970	The Long Arm		TV series
1971-72	The Godfathers	Chris Johnson	TV series
	Homicide		TV series
	Division 4		TV series
	The Sullivans		TV series
	A Country Practice		TV series

=== As crew ===
Year	Title	Role	Type
1971-72	The Godfathers	Producer	TV series
1972	Crisis	Producer	TV movie
1972	The Spoiler	Producer	TV series
1972	Jesus Christ Superstar	Producer	Documentary
1973	The People Next Door	Producer	TV series
1975	Paradise	Producer	TV movie
1976	Is There Anybody There?	Producer	TV movie
1977	Mama's Gone A-Hunting	Producer, Story	TV movie
1977	The Alternative	Producer	TV movie
1977	Gone to Ground	Producer	TV movie
1977	Death Train	Producer	TV movie
1977	Roses Bloom Twice	Producer	TV movie
1978	The Night Nurse	Producer	TV movie
1978	The Newman Shame	Producer	TV movie
1978	Image of Death	Producer	TV movie
1978	Plunge Into Darkness	Producer	TV movie
1978	Demolition	Producer	TV movie
1984	The Settlement	Producer	Feature film
1988-91	Rafferty's Rules	Producer	TV series
1991	The Time Game	Executive producer	TV movie
1992	The Distant Home	Executive producer	TV movie
1993	You and Me and Uncle Bob	Producer	TV movie
1993	Big Ideas	Producer	TV movie
1994	Blue Heelers	Supervising producer	TV series
1996	The Territorians	Producer	TV movie
1996	13 Gantry Row	Producer	TV movie

== Notes ==
- Beilby, Peter; Murray, Scott (September–October 1979). "Robert Bruning". Cinema Papers. pp. 517–519.
