= Peter Maxwell (director) =

British film director (1921–2013)

- Born: Peter Magitai; 23 January 1921; Vienna, Austria
- Died: 5 April 2013 (aged 92); Australia
- Citizenship: United Kingdom/Australia
- Occupations: Film and television director, scriptwriter
- Years active: United Kingdom 1949–1977, Australia 1977–1990

Peter Maxwell (23 January 1921 – 5 April 2013) born as Peter Magitai, was a British, and later Australian director and screenwriter of television and film.

== Biography ==
He was born in Vienna, Austria, to newspaper journalist Leo Magatai and wife Johanna. His family fled Vienna in the 1930s, and he changed his surname to enter the British Army. After having been posted to India, he returned to Britain to work as an assistant director to Alexander Korda in 1949. He worked briefly in Australia in the early 1960s before returning to England.

In 1967 he emigrated to Australia permanently, where he directed such films as Country Town and television series including Bellbird, Rip Tide and A Country Practice.

== Selected filmography ==
- Blind Spot (1958)
- The Desperate Man (1959)
- The Ghost Train Murder (1959)
- The Long Shadow (1961)
- Serena (1962)
- Dilemma (1962)
- Impact (1963)
- The Switch (1963)
- Country Town (1971)
- Boney (1972 – 1st series: 7 eps. 1973 – 2nd series: 4 eps)
- Polly Me Love (1976)
- Plunge Into Darkness (1977)
- Bailey's Bird (1979) (TV series)
- Touch and Go (1980)
- The Coast Town Kids (1980)
- The Mystery at Castle House (1982)
- Platypus Cove (1983)
