= Gone to Ground =

- Written by: Bruce A. Wishart
- Directed by: Kevin James Dobson
- Starring: Charles Tingwell; Eric Oldfield
- Country of origin: Australia
- Original language: English

Production
- Producer: Robert Bruning
- Cinematography: Russell Boyd
- Editor: Rod Hay
- Running time: 74 mins
- Production company: Gemini Productions
- Budget: $90,000

Original release
- Network: Seven Network
- Release: 1977

Gone to Ground is a 1977 Australian TV movie about a man pursued by a killer.

It was one of a series of TV movies Bruning made for Channel 7. Although he sold them to Paramount for worldwide distribution, he found making them was not profitable, so sold his company to Reg Grundy.

== Plot ==
Jimmy Flemming, the owner of a surfing supply store has been receiving death threats. After he is beaten up by surfers he "goes to ground" with his wife Angela and the house of an old friend. However they are followed there by a mysterious motorcyclist.

Harry Ferguson is married to Grace but is sleeping with his secretary Kathleen.

== Cast ==
- Eric Oldfield as Jimmy Flemming
- Bud Tingwell as Harry Ferguson
- Elaine Lee as Grace Ferguson
- Robyn Gibbes as Angela Flemming
- Marion Johns as Ma Bishop
- Dennis Grosvenor as Bart
- Judy Lynne as Kathleen
- Allan Penney as Peters
- Marcus Haleas as Anderson
- John Orcsik

== Production ==
The film was shot in Sydney, including some night scenes at Luna Park.

== Reception ==
The Sydney Morning Herald said that "Eric Oldfield conies off exceptionally well" and the script has "more twists than a corkscrew" but the direction "involves a conglomeration of quick scene changes, flashbacks and slow motion that does nothing more than confuse. So swiftly do the scenes change that dialogue often overlaps into the next frame. It takes about 40 minutes to get some idea of what the film is about."

Another review in the same paper said the script "reduces a taut thriller to a limp farce" where the dialogue was "ineffably silly."
