= Chopper Squad =

1976–1979 Australian television series

- Genre: Drama
- Written by: Everett De Roche (pilot only); Denise Morgan; Don Battye and others
- Directed by: Simon Wincer; Rod Hardy; Graeme Arthur and others
- Starring: Dennis Grosvenor; Robert Coleby; Eric Oldfield; Graham Rouse
- Theme music composer: Mike Perjanik
- Country of origin: Australia
- Original language: English
- No. of seasons: 2
- No. of episodes: 26

Production
- Producer: Don Battye
- Cinematography: Paul Onorato
- Running time: 50 minutes
- Production companies: Reg Grundy Organisation (series); Network Ten (pilot)

Original release
- Network: Network Ten
- Release: 5 November 1976 – 18 February 1979

Chopper Squad is an Australian television series produced by the Reg Grundy Organisation for the 0-10 Network (as it was then known).

The series followed a helicopter rescue team operating on Dee Why beach in Sydney.

== Production ==
=== Pilot ===
The original pilot was made in 1976, airing in Melbourne in November 1976 and Newcastle in August 1977. There was quite a time lag between the pilot and the series going to air in April 1978.

As with many series there were changes between the initial pilot and the broadcast series. Three actors from the pilot did not continue into the series - Rebecca Gilling, Max Osbiston and Tony Bonner. Additionally, the surnames of characters Phil and Tim were changed.

=== Series ===
The pilot was followed by two series with a total of 26 episodes airing between 1978 and 1979. Shortly after the show began, the helicopter base on the show moved its operations from Dee Why Beach Surf Life Saving Club to Palm Beach Surf Lifesaving Club.

== Broadcast ==
During 1988, the Ten Network in Sydney replayed a select few episodes of the first 1978 series during the Saturday or Sunday afternoon, usually around the 4pm timeslot to try capitalise on a nostalgic period as a lead in to the 5pm Eyewitness News.

The complete series was later rescreened weekday mornings at 5am for the final time during the early 1990s. It has not screened in Australia since that time, nor received a home media release.

== Cast ==
=== Main cast ===
- Dennis Grosvenor as Jebbie Best
- Robert Coleby as Barry Drummond
- Eric Oldfield as Phil Trayle
- Jeanie Drynan as Georgia Beattie
- Graham Rouse as Roley
- Tony Hughes as Tim Gray

== The helicopters ==
=== VH-UCH ===
VH-UCH, a Bell 206A, only appeared in the pilot.

=== VH-FHF ===
VH-FHF was used for the main series. In real life VH-FHF a Bell 206B "Jet Ranger II" was initially used from approximately 1977 by Westpac Life Saver Rescue Helicopter Service, that was established by Surf Life Saving Australia in 1973 on an initial sponsorship of $25 000 from the Bank of New South Wales (now Westpac).

After serving the Wales rescue team, VH-FHF was bought by PHS, professional helicopter services. It's still in operations serving the Government of Victoria as Firebird 301 and does tourist flights at Uluru. The JetRanger VH-FHF became registered VH-PHF.

VH-FHF registration number was given to a MBB Kawasaki BK-117B-2. The "new" VH-FHF is operated by the NSW Rural Fire Service.
