= Certain Women (TV series) =

- Genre: Serial
- Created by: Tony Morphett
- Starring: June Salter; Queenie Ashton; Joan Bruce; Elisabeth Crosby; Judy Morris; Jenny Lee
- Country of origin: Australia
- Original language: English
- No. of seasons: 6
- No. of episodes: 166

Original release
- Network: ABC
- Release: 14 February 1973 – 22 December 1976

Certain Women is an Australian television soap opera created by prominent Australian TV dramatist Tony Morphett and produced by the Australian Broadcasting Commission between 1973 and 1976. There were a total of 166 fifty-minute episodes. Episodes 1–59 were produced in black and white and, starting in with the introduction of colour broadcasting in Australia in 1975, episodes 60–166 were produced and broadcast in colour.

== Program synopsis ==
The idea for the series reportedly grew out of Morphett's frustration with the lack of good roles for female actors on Australian TV at the time. The series premiered as a six-part mini-series, with each episode dealing with a different member of the Stone/Lucas family. The mini-series proved to be so popular that the format was revised into an ongoing series.

== Cast ==
=== Main ===
| Actor | Role | Eps. |
|---|---|---|
| Brian Wenzel | Barry Gardiner | 90 |
| Ivar Kants | Michael Fraser | 68 |
| Jenny Lee | Helen Stone | 75 |
| Joan Bruce | Jane Stone | 166 |
| June Salter | Frieda Lucas | 166 |
| Queenie Ashton | Dolly Lucas | 166 |
| Ron Graham | Alan Stone | 98 |

=== Regular ===
| Actor | Role | Eps. |
|---|---|---|
| Anne Haddy | Barbara | 18 |
| Bruce Spence | Julius 'Big Julie' Primmer | 19 |
| Christine Amor | Gillian Stone | 18 |
| Diane Craig | Marjorie Faber | 27 |
| Elisabeth Crosby | Gillian Stone | 27 |
| Joanne Samuel | Caroline Stone | 29 |
| Judy Morris | Marjorie Faber | 26 |
| Kris McQuade | Christine Clayton | 11 |
| Peter Sumner | Carl Faber | 16 |
| Shane Porteous | Peter Clayton | 26 |

== Screening schedule in Australia ==
Certain Women was very popular and after initially being screened in February 1973 with just six episodes, as tv plays, it returned to Australian TV screens on 10 October 1973. The second series consisted of 26 episodes. The main screening of Certain Women was on Wednesday evening, commencing at 8.00 pm after ABC's current affairs program This Day Tonight.

The same main characters from the original six tv plays returned – solicitor Frieda Lucas (June Salter), her widowed mother Dolly (Queenie Ashton), Dolly’s elder daughter Jane (Joan Bruce), as did the Stone family's other three daughters, Marjorie (Judy Morris), Helen (Jenny Lee) and Gillian (Elisabeth Crosby), plus their son Damon, and Marjorie’s husband, Carl Faber (Peter Sumner).

New to the second series were a young doctor, Julius Primmer, known as 'Big Julie' (Bruce Spence), and an NCO in the regular Army, Barry Gardiner (Brian Wenzel), plus a young nurse from the country, called Michelle.

Apart from Morphett, playwright David Williamson and writer Fred "Cul" Cullen contributed scripts and story arcs.

By mid 1976, Certain Women had moved to 8.30 pm, following the ABC show The Inventors. Sunday evenings saw the preceding weekly episode repeated at around 10.30pm.

== Cancellation ==
The period 1975–1978 saw many changes to the Australian Government owned, Australian Broadcasting Commission (ABC). At the time, there was an impetus by the Government to cut the ABC's overall operating costs and budget. By mid 1976, the ABC announced that the 1976 season of Certain Women, would be its last. The final episode of Certain Women was screened in Australia in its usual Wednesday evening time slot, on 22 December 1976. Despite the series still having continued popularity, it had simply fallen victim to the ABC's budget cuts.

When the series folded, many of the actors went on to other series on Australian commercial television. A package of Certain Women episodes was also sold and screened on television, in the United Kingdom. It was however not repeated in Australia, as in most cases the repeat had already been shown on ABC television the following Sunday night.

== Existing ABC Videotape ==
Originally it was thought all or most of the 166 episodes had either been junked or wiped. According to a 1999 article by Bob Ellis (whose wife Anne Brooksbank wrote for the series), almost all but a handful of the episodes of Certain Women were subsequently wiped by the ABC, although episodes were still being shown as late as 1981, on British television.

However, in early 2016, it was revealed that about a third of the series was still in existence and had previously undergone preservation. The remaining 50 episodes are mainly from the latter two colour seasons from 1975 and 1976. In 2006, these were digitised for preservation by the ABC. However their future for broadcasting or any DVD release remains unknown.

All or most of the other episodes from the 1973-74 black and white era of the program, have either been fully junked or erased. However, there are various filming inserts for the missing episodes which have survived and been kept. These are not complete episodes but are outdoor filming scenes which were then dropped into the final program.

== Theme music ==
The main title theme track for the Certain Women series exists in the ABC sound library. From time to time, it has been included on various ABC TV theme music compact discs, available for commercial release.

== Archival clip from the series ==
The Australian National Film & Sound Archive website has a short excerpt of the final episode of Certain Women, (episode number 166), which was originally screened in December 1976. It has placed the 2-minute excerpt from the episode on its website, for viewing. This is available on the following link.

http://aso.gov.au/titles/tv/certain-women-episode-166/
