= Ozploitation =

Genre of film produced in Australia

Ozploitation films are exploitation films – a category of low-budget horror, comedy, sexploitation and action films – made in Australia after the introduction of the R rating in 1971. The year also marked the beginnings of the Australian New Wave movement, and the Ozploitation style peaked in the same period (early 1970s to late 1980s).

Ozploitation is often considered a smaller wave within the New Wave, covering a wide range of genres from sexploitation, biker films, horror and even martial arts.

The origin of the term "Ozploitation" is credited to the documentary Not Quite Hollywood: The Wild, Untold Story of Ozploitation!. This 2008 feature explores Ozploitation films made during the Australian New Wave. The film includes interviews with numerous figures involved in Ozploitation, as well as fans of the genre, including American director Quentin Tarantino, who coined the phrase "Aussiesploitation", which director Mark Hartley then shortened to "Ozploitation".

== Notable films ==
The following films were featured in the 2008 documentary Not Quite Hollywood: The Wild, Untold Story of Ozploitation and/or included in the 2014 compilation Ozploitation Trailer Explosion or released on DVD or Blu-ray under the banner Ozploitation Classics by Umbrella Entertainment.

=== 1970s ===
- The Naked Bunyip (1970)
- Stork (1971)
- Wake in Fright (1971)
- Night of Fear (1972)
- The Adventures of Barry McKenzie (1972)
- Alvin Purple (1973)
- Libido (1973)
- The Cars That Ate Paris (1974)
- Petersen (1974)
- Barry McKenzie Holds His Own (1974)
- Stone (1974)
- Alvin Rides Again (1974)
- The Love Epidemic (1975)
- The True Story of Eskimo Nell (1975)
- The Man from Hong Kong (1975)
- Plugg (1975)
- Scobie Malone (1975)
- Inn of the Damned (1975)
- Australia After Dark (1975)
- The Great Macarthy (1975)
- Sidecar Racers (1975)
- Mad Dog Morgan (1976)
- Eliza Fraser (1976)
- End Play (1976)
- Fantasm (1976)
- Deathcheaters (1976)
- Don's Party (1976)
- Oz (1976)
- Fantasm Comes Again (1977)
- The FJ Holden (1977)
- Raw Deal (1977)
- Journey Among Women (1977)
- Summer City (1977)
- The ABC of Love and Sex: Australia Style (1978)
- The Scalp Merchant (1978)
- Stunt Rock (1978)
- Patrick (1978)
- Money Movers (1978)
- Long Weekend (1978)
- Mad Max (1979)
- The Last of the Knucklemen (1979)
- Thirst (1979)
- The Plumber (1979)
- Snapshot (1979)
- Felicity (1979)

=== 1980s ===
- The Chain Reaction (1980)
- Nightmares (1980)
- Touch and Go (1980)
- Harlequin (1980)
- Final Cut (1980)
- Race for the Yankee Zephyr (1981)
- Centrespread (1981)
- Roadgames (1981)
- Pacific Banana (1981)
- The Survivor (1981)
- Mad Max 2 (1981)
- Lady Stay Dead (1981)
- Dead Kids (1981)
- Alison's Birthday (1981)
- Hoodwink (1981)
- The Killing of Angel Street (1981)
- Running on Empty (1982)
- Turkey Shoot (1982)
- Attack Force Z (1982)
- Brothers (1982)
- Dead Easy (1982)
- Freedom (1982)
- Next of Kin (1982)
- A Dangerous Summer (1982)
- Crosstalk (1982)
- The Return of Captain Invincible (1983)
- Midnite Spares (1983)
- BMX Bandits (1983)
- Innocent Prey (1983)
- Goodbye Paradise (1983)
- Hostage (1983)
- Coming of Age (1984)
- Leonora (1984)
- One Night Stand (1984)
- Razorback (1984)
- Melvin, Son of Alvin (1984)
- Fortress (1985)
- Wills & Burke (1985)
- Mad Max Beyond Thunderdome (1985)
- Fair Game (1986)
- Frenchman's Farm (1986)
- Sky Pirates (1986)
- Windrider (1986)
- Frog Dreaming (1986)
- Run, Chrissie, Run! (1986)
- Dead End Drive-In (1986)
- Cassandra (1987)
- Dark Age (1987)
- Day of the Panther (1987)
- The Time Guardian (1987)
- Howling III (1987)
- Initiation (1987)
- Outback Vampires (1987)
- Dangerous Game (1987)
- Les Patterson Saves the World (1987)
- Running from the Guns (1987)
- Pandemonium (1987)
- Coda (1987)
- Contagion (1987)
- As Time Goes By (1988)
- The Dreaming (1988)
- Out of the Body (1988)
- To Make a Killing (1988)
- Incident at Raven's Gate (1988)
- Kadaicha (1988)
- Breaking Loose (1988)
- Spirits of the Air, Gremlins of the Clouds (1989)
- Houseboat Horror (1989)
- Sons of Steel (1989)

=== 1990s ===
- Bloodmoon (1990)
- Death in Brunswick (1990)
- Sher Mountain Killings Mystery (1990)
- Dead Sleep (1990)
- Fatal Bond (1991)
- Hurricane Smith (1992)
- Bloodlust (1992)
- Body Melt (1993)
- Signal One (1994)

== Revival ==
While the genre largely faded by the 1990s in favor of more mainstream fare, many genre films from the 2000s onwards have been described or promoted as a revival of the classic era of the 1970s and 80s.

=== 2000s ===
- Cut (2000)
- Cubbyhouse (2001)
- Risk (2001)
- He Died with a Felafel in His Hand (2003)
- Gettin' Square (2003)
- Undead (2003)
- Visitors (2003)
- Lost Things (2004)
- Feed (2005)
- Wolf Creek (2005)
- Suburban Mayhem (2006)
- Solo (2006)
- Rogue (2007)
- Storm Warning (2007)
- Black Water (2007)
- Gabriel (2007)
- Gone (2007)
- Dying Breed (2008)
- Lake Mungo (2008)
- The Horseman (2008)
- Long Weekend (2008)
- Acolytes (2008)
- The Loved Ones (2009)
- Triangle (2009)
- Prey (2009)
- Coffin Rock (2009)
- Crush (2009)

=== 2010s ===
- Daybreakers (2010)
- Road Train (2010)
- Animal Kingdom (2010)
- Bad Behaviour (2010)
- The Reef (2010)
- The Clinic (2010)
- Needle (2010)
- Uninhabited (2010)
- Primal (2010)
- Blame (2010)
- Red Hill (2010)
- Crawl (2011)
- The Tunnel (2011)
- X: Night of Vengeance (2011)
- Bait 3D (2012)
- 100 Bloody Acres (2012)
- Crawlspace (2013)
- Patrick (2013)
- Wolf Creek 2 (2013)
- Wyrmwood (2014)
- The Rover (2014)
- Lemon Tree Passage (2014)
- The Mule (2014)
- Charlie's Farm (2014)
- The Suicide Theory (2014)
- Turkey Shoot (2014)
- Kill Me Three Times (2014)
- Plague (2014)
- The Pack (2015)
- Lead Me Astray (2015)
- Mad Max: Fury Road (2015)
- StalkHer (2015)
- Infini (2015)
- Terminus (2015)
- Better Watch Out (2016)
- Sheborg Massacre (2016)
- Down Under (2016)
- Spin Out (2016)
- Scare Campaign (2016)
- Red Billabong (2016)
- Killing Ground (2016)
- The Osiris Child: Science Fiction Volume One (2016)
- Red Christmas (2016)
- Bad Blood (2017)
- Fags in the Fast Lane (2017)
- Cargo (2017)
- 1% (2017)
- Musclecar (2017)
- Tarnation (2017)
- Boar (2017)
- Occupation (2018)
- Upgrade (2018)
- Nekrotronic (2018)
- The Nightingale (2018)
- The Faceless Man (2019)

=== 2020s ===
- Black Water: Abyss (2020)
- Occupation: Rainfall (2020)
- The Reef: Stalked (2022)
- The Royal Hotel (2023)
- Birdeater (2023)
- Furiosa: A Mad Max Saga (2024)
- Rippy (2024)
- The Surfer (2024)
- Dangerous Animals (2025)

== See also ==
- Australian New Wave
- B movie
- Blaxploitation
- Cinema of Australia
- Z movie
