= Reg Gorman =

Australian actor and comedian (1932–2021)

- Born: 2 August 1932; Sydney, New South Wales, Australia
- Died: 5 August 2021 (aged 89); Melbourne, Victoria, Australia
- Occupations: Actor, comedian, vaudevillian
- Years active: 1964-2021
- Known for: The Sullivans; Fergus McPhail
- Spouse: Judith Roberts (m. 1964)
- Children: 3
- Relatives: Olivia Deeble (granddaughter)
- Website: Gorman Works

Reg Gorman (2 August 1932 – 5 August 2021) was an Australian television and film actor, and comedian, he was known best for his role in TV serial The Sullivans, as Jack Fletcher. and children's series Fergus McPhail as Harry Patterson.

Gorman was also active in radio dramas and theatre and was one of the last active vaudeville performers in Australia.

== Personal life ==
Reg Gorman, trained with Hayes Gordon and J. C. Williamson Theatre Company, he was married to fellow actor Judith Roberts. The couple had three children: Kate, Karl and Charmaine. They raised their children together while working in the theatre, television and film industries.

== Career ==
=== Television roles ===
While having his comedy roots in vaudeville, Gorman began his television career with appearances on the Australian television series Consider Your Verdict in 1964 and again in 1966. His first recurring star role in a series was the ATN series Mrs. Finnegan as Darby Finnigan in 13 episodes from 1970 to 1971.

In 1976, he joined the cast of The Sullivans and remained in his role of Jack Fletcher for the series' entire 1976–1983 run.

Gorman played the guest role of Bert Gibbs in Prisoner in 1984, and appeared in several episodes of the series The Henderson Kids (1985). In 1985 he guested in nine episodes of Neighbours as Wally Walters, returning to the series again in 1999 in a different role.

He starred as Reg Hide in the 1987 series pilot Jackal and Hide alongside Norman Yemm, his former co-star from The Sullivans, who co-starred in the pilot as the character of Norm Jackal.

In 1994, he played the role of Mr. Fowler in the Hugh Jackman vehicle Snowy River: The McGregor Saga. In 1997 he held the role of Grandpa in seven episodes of The Wayne Manifesto.

From 2000 through to 2001, he appeared in the series Something in the Air in four episodes as Ken. He also appeared as Harry Patterson in all 26 episodes of the 2004 comedy series Fergus McPhail.

=== Film roles ===
Gorman was also involved in numerous films, beginning in 1968 as Otto in the western drama Koya no toseinin (released in English as The Drifting Avenger), and up to his later projects, Animals and the short film Like It Was Yesterday (both 2012).

Gorman was described as being one of the last Australian vaudeville performers.

== Death ==
Gorman died from cancer at The Alfred Hospital in Melbourne, aged 89, on 5 August 2021.

== Filmography ==
=== Television ===
Year	Title	Role	Type
1961	Whiplash	Gang member	TV series, 1 episode
1964–66	Consider Your Verdict	Reg Fraser	TV series, 2 episodes
1967	Contrabandits	Pogo / Fred	TV series, 2 episodes
1968–69	Skippy	Jim Nelson / Jim Paine	TV series, 2 episodes
1969	I've Married a Bachelor	Sergeant Grogan	TV series, 1 episode
1969	Riptide	Reg / Wal / Charlie	TV series, 3 episodes
1969	The Rovers	Policeman	TV series, 1 episode
1969	Woobinda, Animal Doctor		TV series, 1 episode
1970–71	Mrs. Finnegan	Darby Finnegan	TV series, 13 episodes
1971–73	Spyforce	Murphy / Eddie	TV series, 2 episodes
1972	Barrier Reef	George	TV series, 1 episode
1972	Boney	Bray	TV series, 1 episode
1972	Division 4	Ted Morris / Fred Jackson / Cliff Wood	TV series, 2 episodes
1973	Our Man in the Company	TV technician	TV series, 1 episode
1974	Rush	Craig	TV series, 1 episode
1965–76	Homicide	Eric Dowling / Alfred Harrison / Mick Ryan / Fred Dowling / Mick Evans / Howard Wilson / Max Saunders	TV series, 8 episodes
1972–76	Matlock Police	Jock McKenzie / Fishy Taylor / Murray Slater / Brian Bennett / Paddy / Joe Campbell	TV series, 6 episodes
1976	The Bluestone Boys	Brigsy	TV series
1976	Bluey	Nipper Read	TV series, 1 episode
1976	Power Without Glory	Priest	TV miniseries, 1 episode
1976–83	The Sullivans	Jack Fletcher	TV series, 1114 episodes
1981	I Can Jump Puddles	Arthur	TV miniseries, 1 episode
1983	Carson's Law	Sergeant / Tate	TV series, 2 episodes
1983	Home	Maguire	TV series, 2 episodes
1983	All the Rivers Run	Examining Skipper	TV series, 2 episodes
1984	Special Squad	Ryan	TV series, 1 episode: "Trojan Horses"
1984	Prisoner	Bert Gibbs	TV series, 4 episodes
1985	A Thousand Skies	Joe the Fireman	TV series, 1 episode
1985	The Henderson Kids	Kernow	TV series, 11 episodes
1986	My Brother Tom	M / O Driver	TV miniseries, 1 episode
1986	The Fast Lane	Lou	TV series, 1 episode
1986	A Country Practice	Fisherman	TV series, 2 episodes
1986	Sword of Honour	Jack	TV miniseries, 1 episode
1987	Jackal and Hide	Reg Hide	TV series
1988	Sentiments	Repo man	TV series, 1 episode
1990	The Great Air Race	Race official (Charleville)	TV miniseries, 1 episode
1992	Boys from the Bush	Johnny	TV series, 1 episode
1992	The New Adventures of Black Beauty	Richmond	TV series, 1 episode
1992	Kelly	Fireman	TV series, 1 episode
1994	Snowy River: The McGregor Saga	Mr Fowler	TV series, 6 episodes
1994	Law of the Land	Gary Jarvis	TV series, 1 episode
1985–99	Neighbours	Wally Walters / Jock Finch	TV series, 10 episodes
1995–01	Blue Heelers	Maxie Stubbs / Chook Fowler / Freddie	TV series, 3 episodes
1996	Mercury	Bruce Cartwright	TV miniseries, 1 episode
1997	The Wayne Manifesto	Grandpa	TV series, 7 episodes
1998	State Coroner	Charles Shaw	TV series, 1 episode
2000–01	Something in the Air	Ken	TV series, 4 episodes
2001	My Brother Jack	Clarrie	TV miniseries
2001	Shock Jock	Bill	TV series, 2 episodes
2002	Legacy of the Silver Shadow	Checkers	TV series, 1 episode
2004	Fergus McPhail	Harry Patterson	TV series, 26 episodes
2010	The Pacific	Elderly man on trolley	TV miniseries, 1 episode
2012	Woodley	Priest	TV series. 1 episode
2012	Problems	Ron	TV series, 4 episodes
2017	Get Krack!n	Pete Stark	TV series, 1 episode
2022	More Than This	Nuts	TV series, 1 episode

=== Film ===
Year	Title	Role	Type
1963	Prelude to Harvest	Seaman	TV movie
1965	Rusty Bugles	Ollie	TV movie
1965	The Sweet Sad Story of Elmo and Me		TV movie
1968	The Drifting Avenger (aka Koya no toseinin)	Otto	Feature film
1969	It Takes All Kinds	Man at airport	Feature film
1969	The Intruders	Boatman (uncredited)	Feature film
1970	Ned Kelly	Bracken (uncredited)	Feature film
1974	Between Wars	Orderly	Feature film
1974	Alvin Rides Again	Bookmaker	Feature film
1975	Inn of the Damned	Coach driver	Feature film
1975	Plugg	Constable Hector Raymond	Feature film
1975	Polly Me Love		TV movie
1975	End Play	TV reporter	Feature film
1976	Caddie	Male drinker	Feature film
1983	Dusty	Watson	Feature film
1987	The Bit Part	Scott	Feature film
1987	Slate, Wyn & Me	Wilkinson	Feature film
1987	A Matter of Convenience	Repo Man	TV movie
1988	A Cry in the Dark (aka Evil Angels)	Mr. Whittaker	Feature film
1988	The Four Minute Mile	Vancouver journalist	TV movie
1990	The Big Steal	Neighbour	Feature film
1990	A Date with Destiny	Grooper	Short film
1997	The Alive Tribe	Barfly	Feature film
1999	The Craic	RSL Manager	Feature film
2002	Dalkeith	Len	Feature film
2003	Gusto	Old Man	Short film
2005	You and Your Stupid Mate	Stan	Feature film
2008	Guy in a Field	Father	Short film
2006	Five Moments of Infidelity	David	Feature film
2007	The Postman		Short film
2009	Nero's		Short film
2009	Swings and Roundabouts	Roy	Short film
2010	Punch Drunk	Joe Sparro	Short film
2011	Percy	Percy	Short film
2011	The Cup	Vern	Feature film
2010	The Pawn	Private Domenic Chaplan	Feature film
2011	Cold Showers	The Manager	Short film
2012	Animals	Richard Patterson M.P.	Feature film
2012	Like It Was Yesterday	Arthur	Short film
2014	I Remember the Future	Abe	Short film
2017	The Comet Kids	Lucas	Feature film
2018	Two Moments in Time	Grandad Thatchette	Short film

== Theatre ==
Year	Title	Role	Type
1962	What's New?		Phillip Street Theatre, Sydney
1962	A Wish is a Dream		Phillip Street Theatre, Sydney
1963–64	How to Succeed in Business Without Really Trying	Jenkins	Her Majesty's Theatre, Melbourne, His Majesty's Theatre, Perth, Her Majesty's Theatre, Adelaide
1964	Santa's Christmas Party		Phillip Street Theatre, Sydney
1965	The Diplomatic Baggage		Palace Theatre, Sydney
1966	The Odd Couple		Comedy Theatre, Melbourne
1967	Sweet Charity	2nd cop / Waiter / Daddy Johann Sebastian Brubeck / Barney	Her Majesty's Theatre, Sydney, Her Majesty's Theatre, Melbourne
1971	The Night Thoreau Spent in Jail	Sam Staples	Ensemble Theatre, Sydney
1973	Summer of the Seventeenth Doll		Nimrod Street Theatre
1975	The Enchanted Forest		St James Playhouse, Sydney with PACT Youth Theatre
1976; 1980	Dry Run		Marian Street Theatre, National Theatre, Melbourne
1980	The Comedians		Tikki and John’s Vaudeville, Melbourne
1983	The Student Prince	Lutz	Comedy Theatre, Melbourne
1985	On the Blind Side (Golden Oldies - the Play)		Ensemble Theatre, Sydney, Playhouse Canberra
1990	Favourite Son		Comedy Theatre, Melbourne
1992	Petrov: The Musical		Melbourne Concert Hall
1998	Dick Whittington and His Cat		Melbourne Athenaeum
1999	Dimboola	Darkie	Illusions Showroom, Melbourne
2000	Call Me Madam	Congressman Wilkins	State Theatre, Melbourne
2001	How to Succeed in Business Without Really Trying	Scrubwomen, Wally Womper	State Theatre, Melbourne
2001	The Shrinking Ledge		Chapel Off Chapel
2003	Snap Shots		Gasworks Theatre, Melbourne with The Affordable Theatre Company
2004	Reg Gorman - Hanging on to Vaudeville	Comedian / Self	Melbourne Town Hall for Melbourne International Comedy Festival
2004	Hats Off! to Sondheim		National Theatre, Melbourne
2005	McCubbin		BMW Edge, Melbourne with Hydra Productions
