= Terry Bourke =

Australian journalist (1940–2002)

- Born: Terry Christopher Burke; 19 April 1940; Bairnsdale, Victoria, Australia
- Died: 29 June 2002 (aged 62); Sydney, New South Wales, Australia
- Occupations: Journalist; film director; film producer; screenwriter
- Years active: 1966–1988

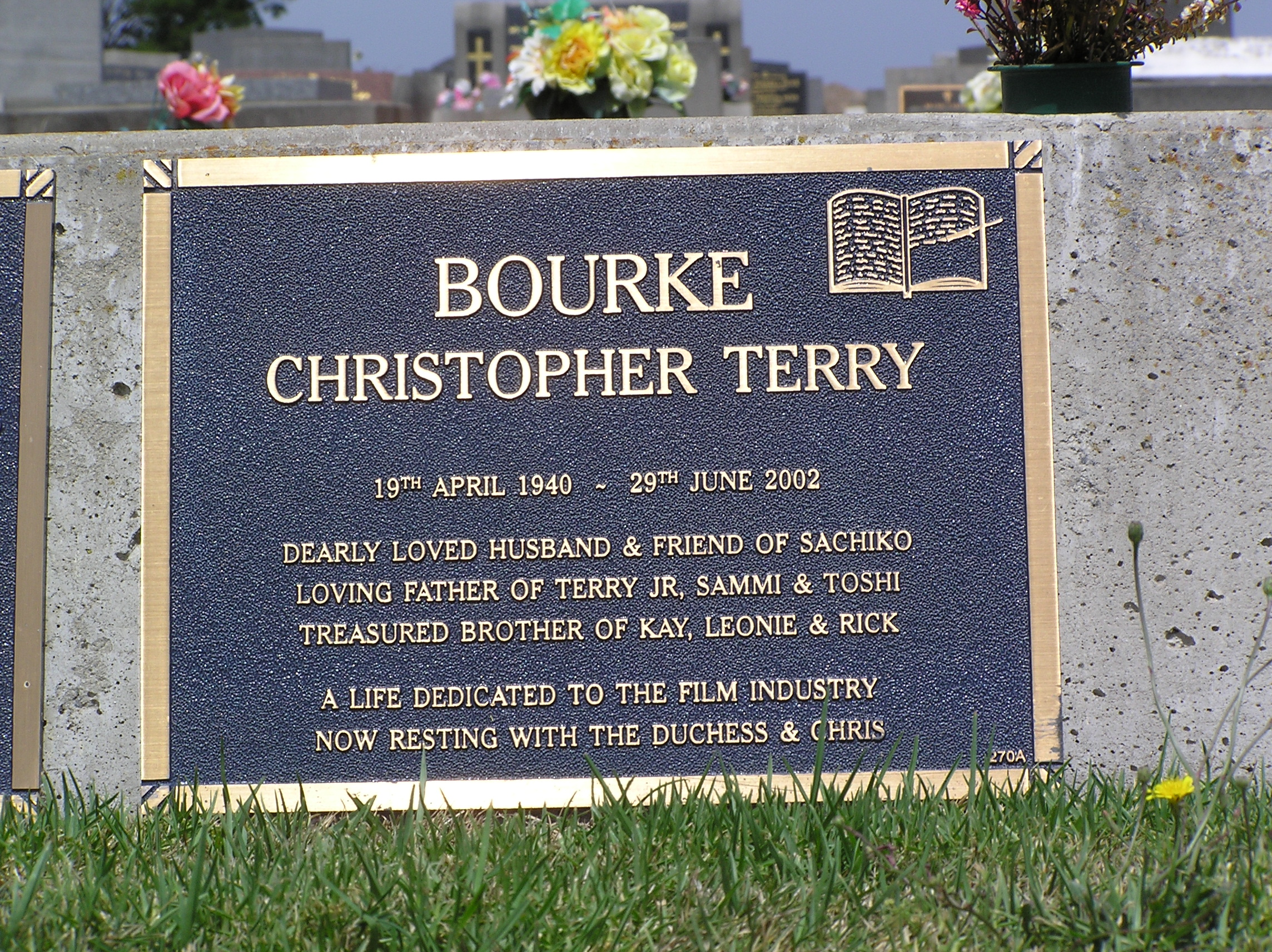
Grave site of Australian Film Maker Terry Bourke located at the Bairnsdale Cemetery

Terry Christopher Bourke (19 April 1940 – 29 June 2002) was an Australian journalist, screenwriter, producer and director.

He worked as a show business journalist and production assistant in Hong Kong for a number of years before returning to Australia in 1971. He made several movies and also worked in television. Phil Avalon called him "one of Australia's first maverick filmmakers".

== Early filmography ==
Bourke was a newspaper journalist for The Australian and The China Mail in the Crown Colony of Hong Kong. He entered the world of feature films in 1965 by raising $320,000 for actor Jeffrey Stone's first and last East-West Motion Picture Ltd production Strange Portrait (1966) with Bourke credited as an associate producer. He continued in Hong Kong shot films being credited as a production manager in Harry Alan Towers' film The Million Eyes of Sumuru (1967) directed by Lindsay Shonteff.

Bourke made his directorial debut when he wrote, produced and directed Sampan AKA San-Ban shot in the New Territories in 1968 with an eye on international distribution. The film attracted threats of censorship and large audiences in Hong Kong as it featured what was regarded as the first nude scene in Hong Kong Cinema when star Dorothy Fu displayed one of her breasts in a scene of her running away from a pursuer. The film became the most successful Hong Kong film of the year. Though Hong Kong censors originally considered cutting the scene but allowed it in the film, the Australian censors excised the scene prior to the film's release. Some sources credited Bourke as being the first Occidential to direct a Hong Kong film

One of the principal investors in Sampan was Guamanian businessman and future senator Gordon Mailloux. He convinced Bourke that with Japanese film crews coming to Guam and bringing in and taking out their equipment at great expense, Guamanians could purchase and be trained in the use of film equipment for the benefit of Japanese or other foreign producers. Bourke wrote, directed and produced Noon Sunday (1969), the first Guamanian feature film though scenes of Son of Godzilla (1967) had previously been filmed there. The film was financed by the Guam Economic Development Authority with interior scenes shot in studios in Hong Kong and special effects model scenes shot in Japan.

Bourke was also credited as a script supervisor on Burgess Meredith's The Yin and the Yang of Mr. Go shot in Hong Kong in 1970.

== Return to Australia ==
Bourke returned to Australia where he was a second unit director and associate director on eight episodes of Spyforce. He also wrote and directed two episodes of the series. Back home at the start of the Australian New Wave of government sponsored feature film production, he made his Australian feature film debut with Night of Fear that was originally intended to be a pilot for an Australian Broadcasting Commission TV series called Fright. When the series was not selected to go to air, Bourke submitted the film for cinema release, however Australian censors initially banned the film. The film was regarded as Australia's first horror film. The film's success led Bourke to be regarded as a horror director, when he followed the film with Inn of the Damned. Bourke shot the film in 1973 with finance coming from the Australian Film Development Corporation. The film was another screenplay planned for the ill-fated ABC Fright series. Bourke described the film as "Hitchcock on Horseback" with the film featuring an international cast including Dame Judith Anderson in her first Australian feature film, John Meillon, Michael Craig and American Alex Cord.

Bourke continued in Australian television series and made for television films as well as making the sex film Plugg, the thriller Little Boy Lost (1978) and a return to the horror genre with Lady Stay Dead (1981). His final credited film was The Tourist (1987).

== Appraisal ==
David Stratton described him as "a second-rate director". Actor and writer Roger Ward called him:

A shifty but clever and cunning little character who did a lot of work. Some was good. However, the good was canceled out by his cavalier attitude to money (always other peoples'), his disrespect of his peers, and an almost obsessive jealousy of anyone else in the industry... To his credit, Terry had an uncanny ability to make a tiny creek in the suburbs of Sydney look like the back blocks of Vietnam. He could also carve a piece of cardboard, put lights behind it and shoot it with a title beneath, and those that saw it on the silver screen would swear it really was a Manhattan skyline. He could shoot beneath a doctored typewriter or through a disassembled camera or use a single house for the entire shoot of a film... At best he was an egotistical arsehole who was nowhere near as talented as he imagined he was... He was also a pathological liar. But that's show business.

A profile in Oz movies said "Bourke was an ineffably optimistic and enthusiastic director who lived to direct films, but he also couldn't direct traffic, let alone a feature film. Well that's not quite correct, he could direct traffic, but only if it crashed and banged and caught fire and exploded and featured excessive nudity and bonus kinky moments."

== Select credits ==
- Strange Portrait (1966)
- Sampan (1968)
- Noon Sunday (1970)
- Spyforce (1971) (TV series)
- Night of Fear (1972)
- Plugg (1975)
- Inn of the Damned (1975)
- Murcheson Creek (1976) (TV series)
- Little Boy Lost (1978)
- Secret Valley (1981) (TV series)
- Lady Stay Dead (1981)
- Brothers (1982)
- The Tourist (1987) (TV movie)

=== Unmade films ===
- Latrik (1971) – an Australian western where Peter Finch leads a gang that pack rapes Rod Taylor's daughter
- Crocodile (1977) – proposed $1.6 million film about a killer crocodile
- The Janus Conspiracy (1980) – about the disappearance of Harold Holt
