= The Faceless Man =

The Faceless Man may refer to:

- The Anome, also known as The Faceless Man, a science fiction novel by Jack Vance
- The Faceless Man (film), a 2019 Australian horror film
