= Alien Terminator =

Alien Terminator may refer to:

- Alien Terminator (1988 film), an Italian film directed by Nello Rossati
- Alien Terminator (1995 film), an American horror film
