= Rod Hay =

English director

Rod Hay (27 August 1947 – 30 November 2019) was an English filmmaker who worked in Australia and South Africa. He started off as an actor, then as an assistant director and editor on many features, before becoming a writer, producer, director.

He lived and worked in South Africa for eight years.

He also wrote Catch Me If You Can, a biography of Darcy Dugan.

== Select credits ==
- A Connecticut Yankee in King Arthur's Court (1970) (TV movie) - editor
- Tales of Washington Irving (1970) (TV movie) - editor
- Night of Fear (1972) - executive producer
- Spyforce (1972–73) - editor
- Inn of the Damned (1975) - producer, editor
- Mama's Gone A-Hunting (1975) (TV movie) - editor
- Lost in the Wild (1976) - editor
- Plugg (1977) - producer, editor
- Dot and the Kangaroo (1977) - editor
- Gone to Ground (1978) - editor
- The Little Convict (1979) - editor
- A Way of Life (1981) - writer/producer/director
- Will to Win (1982) - writer/producer/director
- Stoney the One and Only (1983) - writer/producer/director
- Don't Stop the Music (1984) - writer/producer/director
- Bad Company (1985) - writer/producer/director/editor
- Dot and Keeto (1986) - editor
- Strike Force (1986) - writer/producer/director
- Dot and the Whale (1986) - editor
- Dot Goes to Hollywood (1987) - editor
- Dot and the Smugglers (1987) - editor
- Breaking Loose (1988) - writer/producer/director
- Escape: World Safari III (1988) - editor/second unit director
- Passing Through (1989) - editor
- Run Away (1990) - producer
- The Magic Riddle (1991) - editor
- Sleeping Giants (1994) (documentary) - writer/editor/director
- Champions of the World (1996) (documentary) - writer/producer/director series
- A Change of Heart (1998) - writer/producer/director
- Height of Passion (2000) (documentary) - writer/producer/director series
- How much is Enough (2007) - writer/producer/director series
