= Les Foxcroft =

Australian actor

- Born: Clement Leslie Foxcroft; 19 November 1918; Fitzroy, Victoria, Australia
- Died: 21 July 2004 (aged 85); Sydney, New South Wales, Australia
- Occupation: Actor
- Years active: 1941–1999
- Known for: Number 96 (1972–1977); The Roly Poly Man (1994)

Clement Leslie Foxcroft (19 November 1918 – 24 June 2004) professionally known as Les Foxcroft and credited also as Lester Foxcroft was an Australian character actor with a career spanning nearly 60 years, starting in 1941., working in all major facets of the industry from stage, radio, television and film.

== Early life ==
Foxcroft was born in Fitzroy, Victoria on 19 November 1918, and spent his childhood in Geelong during the Depression. His mother died when he was young, and his father (a South African war veteran who was wounded at Gallipoli), remarried. His stepmother showed him little affection.

Foxcroft worked in a factory after leaving home at age 15. He also learnt to box as a youth. He developed a passion for performing after frequenting the cinema to watch films. He joined Melbourne New Theatre as a teenager, developing his craft in shows such as Showdown in 1941. He was later stationed with the air force in New Guinea, during the Second World War.

== Career ==
After the war, Foxcroft moved to Sydney, joined Actors Equity in 1947 and spent ten years working in radio and performing theatre in the clubs. He made his television debut with the Captain Fortune Show in 1959 and continued in television in Brisbane before returning to Sydney in 1967. With Sydney's New Theatre, Foxcroft was in a 1970 workshop Cassandra Singing, followed by the lead in Brecht’s Mr Puntila and His Man Matti. He then made a video appearance in The Freedom of the City in 1975.

Foxcroft appeared in a large number of television productions. He had a recurring role in series Number 96, as Sir William Mainwaring for three months from 1972 to 1977. He had numerous guest roles in series such as You Can’t See ‘Round Corners, Contrabandits, Riptide, Skippy the Bush Kangaroo, The Rovers, The Link Men, Matlock Police, Spyforce, Boney, Homicide, Rush, Glenview High, Young Ramsay, The Young Doctors, Kingswood Country, Sons and Daughters, Carson's Law, Return to Eden, Mother and Son, G.P., E Street, Water Rats and A Country Practice. He also appeared in several miniseries, including The Battlers, The Timeless Land, The Dismissal and Captain James Cook. He had a recurring role in Luke's Kingdom in 1976.

Foxcroft expanded into film in 1972 with black comedy Private Collection, opposite Michael Caton and Pamela Stephenson. His subsequent film credits included biopic Caddie and family film The Fourth Wish (both in 1976), as well as Weekend of Shadows, Newsfront and Little Boy Lost (all 1978). In the 1980s he starred in the thrillers Lady Stay Dead and Hoodwink (both 1981), biopic about the famed racehorse Phar Lap (1983), comedy-drama Bliss opposite Barry Otto, and an adventure film based on the explorer duo Burke & Wills with Jack Thompson (both in 1985). He also appeared in romantic drama The Crossing (1990) alongside Russell Crowe, and romcom The Girl Who Came Late (1992) with Miranda Otto. He played a main role as Mickey in 1994 film The Roly Poly Man, alongside Paul Chubb. He also appeared in many television films and several short films.

Foxcroft kept working until his retirement in his early 80s. His final film role was in 1999 dance film Kick, alongside Paul Mercurio, Martin Henderson and Radha Mitchell. The same year, he appeared in an episode of medical drama All Saints.

== Personal life and death ==
Foxcroft was married, but after his marriage ended, he returned to Sydney in 1967. Foxcroft had two daughters, Susan Foxcroft and Brenda Chow, and three grandchildren. He died in July 2004, at the age of 85.

== Filmography ==
=== Film ===
| Year | Title | Role | Notes |
|---|---|---|---|
| 1972 | Private Collection | The Citizen | |
| 1973 | I Need More Staff | | Short film |
| 1976 | Caddie | Mr Norris | |
| 1976 | The Fourth Wish | Pat | |
| 1976 | Rate of Exchange | | Short film |
| 1977 | Listen to the Lion | Night Shelter Man | |
| 1977 | Can We Have an Assurance | | Short film |
| 1978 | Weekend of Shadows | Badger | |
| 1978 | Newsfront | Redex Trial Driver | |
| 1978 | Little Boy Lost | Grumps | |
| 1979 | Who'd Be A Shop Steward? | | Short film |
| 1980 | Touch and Go | Husband | |
| 1980 | Maybe This Time | MP 2 | |
| 1981 | Lady Stay Dead | Billy Shepherd | |
| 1981 | Hoodwink | Baldy | |
| 1982 | The Best of Friends | Mr Malone | |
| 1982 | Brothers | Jim Williams | |
| 1983 | The Winds of Jarrah | Woody Gunner | |
| 1983 | Phar Lap | Brazier Man | |
| 1985 | Bliss | Paul Bees | |
| 1985 | Burke & Wills | Harry | |
| 1986 | Beautiful Lies: A Film About Peter Carey | Herbert Badgery (narrator) | Docudrama film |
| 1987 | That Very Troublesome Woman: The Dramatic Search for Mary MacKillop | Ship's Purser | Video |
| 1988 | Vernon | Rod | Short film |
| 1990 | The Crossing | Pop | |
| 1992 | The Girl Who Came Late (aka Daydream Believer) | Perce | |
| 1993 | Bedevil | Old Mickey | |
| 1994 | The Roly Poly Man | Mickey | |
| 1994 | Eternity | | Documentary film |
| 1994 | Kid in a Bin | Tramp | Short film |
| 1995 | Love Amongst the Muffins | Ernie | Short film |
| 1998 | Jimmy | Coach | Short film |
| 1999 | Kick | Old Groundsman | |

=== Television ===
| Year | Title | Role | Notes |
|---|---|---|---|
| 1959 | Captain Fortune Show | Roy Kinghorn, a clown | |
| 1967 | My Name's McGooley, What's Yours? | | 1 episode |
| 1967 | You Can't See 'Round Corners | Customer | 1 episode |
| 1968 | The Battlers | Man in second hotel bar | |
| 1968 | Contrabandits | Sect Member / Foreman | 2 episodes |
| 1969 | Riptide | Tom Willett | 1 episode |
| 1969; 1970 | Skippy the Bush Kangaroo | Cliff / Strapper | 2 episodes |
| 1969; 1970 | The Rovers | Neighbour / Smayell | 2 episodes |
| 1970 | The Link Men | Wilson | 1 episode |
| 1971 | The Comedy Game | Bus Driver 2 | 1 episode |
| 1971–1976 | Matlock Police | Noel Buchanan / Harry Yates / Bob Palmer | 6 episodes |
| 1972 | Spyforce | Bartender | 1 episode |
| 1972 | Catwalk | 1st Reporter | 1 episode |
| 1972 | Birds in the Bush | Jim | 1 episode |
| 1972 | Boney | Yorky | 1 episode |
| 1972 | Snake Gully with Dad and Dave | Father Colquhoun | 1 episode |
| 1973 | And Millions Will Die | Henshaw | TV movie |
| 1974 | Homicide | George Clayton | 1 episode |
| 1975 | Ben Hall | Saucepan Billy | Miniseries, 2 episodes |
| 1975 | Armchair Cinema | Mr Fenner | 1 episode |
| 1976 | Rush | Arnie Bird | 1 episode |
| 1976 | Luke's Kingdom | Morgan | Miniseries, 13 episodes |
| 1976 | The Outsiders | Brian | 1 episode |
| 1976–1977 | Number 96 | Sir William Mainwaring | 26 episodes |
| 1977 | Born to Run (aka Harness Fever) | Loafer | TV movie |
| 1977 | Straight Enough | | TV movie |
| 1977 | Say You Want Me | Scientist | TV movie |
| 1978; 1979 | Glenview High | Mr Moore / Dan Moore | 2 episodes |
| 1978; 1980 | Young Ramsay | Stan Hawkins / Ted Brent | 2 episodes |
| 1979 | Golden Soak | Jacko | Miniseries, 3 episodes |
| 1979 | The Young Doctors | Les Mitchell | 1 episode |
| 1979 | Doctor Down Under | Mr Gilhooley | 1 episode |
| 1980 | The Timeless Land | Sailor | Miniseries, 1 episode |
| 1981 | Kingswood Country | Clarrie | 1 episode |
| 1981 | A Step in the Right Direction | | TV movie |
| 1982 | Spring & Fall | Jack | Anthology series, 1 episode |
| 1983 | The Dismissal | James Cope – The First Speaker | Miniseries, 1 episode |
| 1983 | Sons and Daughters | Warren Hansen | 7 episodes |
| 1984 | Runaway Island | | 2 episodes |
| 1984 | Carson's Law | Alf Buxton | 1 episode |
| 1986 | Return to Eden | Gus Bernard | 2 episodes |
| 1986 | Winners | Pop | Anthology series, 1 episode |
| 1986 | The Last Frontier | Ralph | TV movie |
| 1987 | Great Expectations: The Untold Story | Gaoler | TV movie |
| 1987 | Flight into Hell | | TV movie |
| 1987–1988 | Captain James Cook | Old Salt | Miniseries, 2 episodes |
| 1988 | Australians | The Doctor | Anthology series, episode 8: "Jack Davey" |
| 1988 | The Last Resort | | |
| 1990 | Embassy | Harry | 1 episode |
| 1991 | The Last Crop | Grandpa | TV movie |
| 1992 | Mother and Son | Old Man | 1 episode |
| 1991; 1992 | G.P. | Ted Knowles | 3 episodes |
| 1992 | E Street | Mr. Tracey | 1 episode |
| 1982–1993 | A Country Practice | Neville Brown / Reg Barnes / Alfred | 8 episodes |
| 1996 | Water Rats | Old Man | 1 episode |
| 1997 | Twisted Tales | Neighbour | 1 episode |
| 1998 | 13 Gantry Row | Barber | TV movie |
| 1999 | All Saints | Bill Lucas | 1 episode |

=== Theatre ===
| Year | Title | Role | Notes |
|---|---|---|---|
| 1941 | Showdown | | New Theatre, Melbourne |
| 1946 | Coming Our Way?: White Justice / Barbarous Seville / Other sketches | | New Theatre, Melbourne |
| 1969 | Reedy River | | New Theatre, Sydney |
| 1970 | Cassandra Singing (workshop) | | New Theatre, Sydney |
| 1970 | Mr Puntila and His Man Matti | Lead role | New Theatre, Sydney |
| 1972 | Listen Closely | | Independent Theatre, Sydney |
| 1974 | Harvey | | Marian Street Theatre, Sydney |
| 1975 | The Freedom of the City | | New Theatre, Sydney |
| 1975 | The Floating World | | Nimrod, Sydney |
| 1976 | Comedians | | Ensemble Theatre, Sydney |
| 1983 | The Sentimental Bloke | | Q Theatre, Penrith |
| 1983 | West Side Story | DOC | Her Majesty's Theatre, Sydney, Princess Theatre, Melbourne |
| 1986 | King of Country | | Wharf Theatre, Sydney with STC |
| 1991 | On Top of the World | | Q Theatre, Penrith |
| 1992 | Much Ado About Nothing | | Sydney Opera House with STC |
| 1994 | The Crucible | Francis Nurse | Monash University, Melbourne, Riverside Theatres Parramatta, His Majesty's Theatre, Perth with STC |

=== Radio ===
| Year | Title | Role | Notes |
|---|---|---|---|
| 1979 | The Love System of Madame Amilah | Narrator | ABC Radio Sydney |
