= Noon Sunday =

- Film poster
- Directed by: Terry Bourke
- Written by: Terry Bourke
- Produced by: Gordon Mailloux
- Starring: Mark Lenard; John Russell; Linda Avery; Keye Luke
- Edited by: Gene Ruggiero
- Music by: Nick Demuth
- Production company: GEM Productions
- Distributed by: Crown International
- Release date: 1971
- Running time: 93 mins
- Country: Guam
- Language: English

Noon Sunday is a 1971 action film directed by Terry Bourke about two mercenaries. The film was the first feature produced in Guam.

== Premise ==
Two men are put on an island to assassinate guerrilla leaders.

== Cast ==
- Mark Lenard

== Production ==
Terry Bourke and producer Gordon Mailloux had previously worked on the film Sampan together, which had been a success but Bourke wanted to make something more commercial.

They decided to make a second film in Guam, in part to establish local facilities which could be used by Japanese film crews who often used the island to shoot commercials and films. Money was raised from local investors and the Guam Economic Development Authority and Crown International agreed to distribute.

Shooting took two to three months using a combination of local actors and Hollywood talent. Scenes were shot aboard the USS Razorback. with interior scenes shot in Hong Kong and special effects scenes shot in Japan.

== Reception ==
The film was screened all around the world, making $25,000 in Guam, but according to Mailloux, Crown International took all the money.
