= Cheryl Rixon =

Australian actress and model (born 1954)

- Born: 12 October 1954 (age 70); Perth, Western Australia
- Occupation(s): Actress, model, designer

Cheryl Rixon (born 12 October 1954 in Perth, Western Australia) is an Australian actress and model. She was chosen as the December 1977 Pet of the Month for Penthouse and two years later as Pet of the Year in 1979. Rixon now lives in the US and designs jewelry which she sells under the name of 'Royal Order'. She is married to club owner Art Davis with whom she has two sons, Dylan and Luke Davis.

== Early career ==
In the early 1970s, Rixon was twice a finalist in the annual Miss West Coast bikini beauty pageant, staged in Perth each January. She later appeared as a game show assistant on local TV.

After appearing in the obscure low-budget sex-comedy film Plugg (1975), shot in Perth, Rixon moved interstate to Melbourne and acted in several television roles for Crawford Productions. She played three different roles during the final episodes of the Crawford production Homicide.

Starting in mid-1975 Rixon also began making appearances in Crawford Production's sex-comedy soap opera The Box. Playing television starlet Angela O'Malley, she made several appearances in the series. She left The Box towards the end of 1975, but returned for a three-month stint starting in February 1976.

Rixon subsequently found fame in the US as Penthouse magazine's December 1977 Pet of the Month and in October 1979, she was chosen as the Pet of the Year in a televised pageant held at the Aladdin Hotel in Las Vegas, Nevada. Her pictorial followed the following month in the November 1979 issue, where she graced the cover as well. In July 1980 she kicked off New York Mayor Ed Koch's "Festival of Fragrances". She was again showcased with a ten-page spread in Penthouse in 1980, and posed for Oui magazine in November 1982, where she was also on the cover. During this period she appeared in films such as The Eyes of Laura Mars and Used Cars. Rixon did not receive the Penthouse prizes that had been promised to her and in 1985 took the magazine’s publisher to the New York State Supreme Court, which ruled that she was entitled to them. The judgment was later affirmed on appeal.

== Partial filmography ==
=== Television ===
- The Box (1975–1976) as Angela O’Malley
- Homicide (1976–1977) 3 Guest roles Wendy / Belinda / Prostitute
- Telethon '79 (1979) (TV special) Herself
- Penthouse Pet of the Year 1980 (1980) (TV special US) Herself

=== Film ===
- Plugg (1975) as Kelli Kelly
- Eyes of Laura Mars (1978) as Extra
- Swap Meet (1979) as Annie
- Used Cars (1980) as Margaret
- I Like to Play Games (1995) as Sean
- Dark Secrets (1996) as Philipa
- Scorpio Men On Prozac (2010, as Cheryl Rixon Davis) as Mrs. Everyman

1970s	Evelyn Treacher	Stephanie McLean	Tina McDowall	Patricia Barrett	Avril Lund
1970s	Anneka Di Lorenzo	Laura Bennett Doone	Victoria Lynn Johnson	Dominique Maure	Cheryl Rixon
1980s	Isabella Ardigo	Danielle Deneux	Corinne Alphen	Sheila Kennedy	Linda Kenton
1980s	None	Cody Carmack	Mindy Farrar	Patty Mullen	Ginger Miller
1990s	Stephanie Page	Simone Brigitte	Jisel	Julie Strain	Sasha Vinni
1990s	Gina LaMarca	Andi Sue Irwin	Elizabeth Ann Hilden	Paige Summers	Nikie St. Gilles
2000s	Juliet Cariaga	Zdeňka Podkapová	Megan Mason	Sunny Leone	Victoria Zdrok
2000s	Martina Warren	Jamie Lynn	Heather Vandeven	Erica Ellyson	Taya Parker
2010s	Taylor Vixen	Nikki Benz	Jenna Rose	Nicole Aniston	Lexi Belle
2010s	Layla Sin	Kenna James	Jenna Sativa	Gina Valentina	Gianna Dior
2020s	Lacy Lennon	Kenzie Anne	Amber Marie	-	-
2020s	-	-	-	-	-
