= Chard Hayward =

Australian actor

- Born: Roy Hayward; 1949 (age 75–76); Swansea, Wales
- Occupations: Actor; director; writer; producer; singer

Chard Hayward (born Roy Hayward, 1949) is a Welsh-born Australian-American former actor, director, writer, producer and singer. He is best known for his role of camp barman Dudley Butterfield in the 1970s television soap opera Number 96, he had previously appeared in a small role as a hippie in earlier episodes. Since the early 90s he has been based in the US.

== Biography ==
=== Early life ===
Born as Roy Hayward in Swansea, Wales, in 1949, he initially pursued a career in the military, and at 19 become a commissioned as an officer in the engineers, but decided it was not for him. After jobs as an actuary and part-time work in catering, Hayward heard about the National Institute of Dramatic Art, auditioned, and was accepted. However, he left NIDA after only 12 months to join the Pageant Theatre Company, which toured schools throughout New South Wales. He eventually worked at both directing and producing plays for the company. as well as acting in plays by Shakespeare and Tennessee Williams.

=== Career ===
Hayward's role of high-camp gay caterer and old-movie fan Dudley Butterfield in Number 96 began in late 1973 and quickly became one of the show's most popular and recognised characters. Dudley was involved in a long-running gay relationship with Don Finlayson (Joe Hasham) in the show. Dudley was later revealed as a bisexual and embarked on relationships with women, Dudley opened a hairdressing salon and then a disco, briefly became a television star, and then was shot to death in June 1977 after Hayward decided to leave the series.

His career continued steadily with roles in Australian feature films, drama series and miniseries through the 1980s. In the 1990s he acted on US television with a role in soap opera Santa Barbara. More recent appearances include Babylon 5, Lost and, in 2007, as a surprise guest for the Number 96 reunion on Australia's Where Are They Now?.

== Personal life ==
A legacy of his army years was the nickname Chard - the surname of a famous British Army officer - which he would use as his official stage name throughout his subsequent acting career.

Chard Hayward has two sons, Adam with his first wife, former Miss Australia Sarah Gray, and Sean with one-time US actor Cynthia Killion.

== Filmography (selected) ==
=== Film ===
Year	Title	Role	Type
1971	Homedale	Man at Bar (uncredited)	
1974	Number 96	Dudley Butterfield	Feature film
1979	The Journalist	Barry	Feature film
1979	Thank You	Early Mason	Short film
1981	Lady Stay Dead	Gordon Mason	Feature film
1982	Brothers	Adam Wild	TV movie
1987	Crackdown	Alex Murdock	
1988	The Killing Game	Max	
1988	The Tourist	Abu Gassam	TV movie
1988	Outback Bound	David	TV movie
1988	Violent Zone	Norman McCloskey	
2007	Metamorphosis	Narrator (voice)	
2009	2084	Professor	
2010	Play On	Finlay Kilgour	

=== Television ===
Year	Title	Role	Type
1967	Bellbird		TV series
1971	Homicide	Johnny Parsons	TV series
1972	Lane End	Wentworth	TV series
1972–77	Number 96	Hippy / Dudley Butterfield	TV series, 209 episodes
1983	The Thorn Birds	Arne Swenson	TV miniseries
1984	Carson's Law	Randolph Seaton	TV series
1991	Hunter	Titus Hall	TV series
1991	Santa Barbara	Richard Sedgewick	TV series
1997	Babylon 5	Religious #2	TV series
2000	Days of Our Lives	Barry	TV series
2005	Lost	Australian Official	TV series
