= The Squad (1981 film) =

- Written by: Terry Stapleton
- Directed by: Bob Meillon
- Starring: John Gregg; Louise Howitt; Frank Gallacher; Ken Goodlet; Roger Ward; Andrew Clarke
- Country of origin: Australia
- Original language: English

Production
- Producer: Robert Bruning
- Production company: Crawford Productions

Original release
- Network: Seven Network
- Release: 12 November 1981

The Squad is a 1981 Australian television film about a squad of detectives. It was the pilot for a series that was never made, intended to be a replacement for the TV show Skyways.

== Cast ==
Sources:

- John Gregg
- Frank Gallacher
- Ken Goodlet
- Louise Howitt
- Roger Ward
- Andrew Clarke
- John Ley
- Maureen Edwards
- Michael Pate
- Max Phipps
- Jeff Ashby
- Alwyn Kurts

== Production ==
The series was filmed in Sydney in the first half of 1981. It was the first Sydney-based series from Melbourne-based Crawford Productions, which had produced several successful police dramas by this stage.

== Release ==
The series first aired in Sydney (ATN7) on 12 November 1981 and then in Melbourne (HSV7), retitled as Homicide Squad, on 18 May 1982. Unimpressed with the pilot, the Seven Network strategically chose these air dates, as they were off-peak non-ratings periods.

== Reception ==
The Sydney Morning Herald's Garry Shelley said: "I had to make a hasty decision. Should I (a) stick with it and try to work out just who was on which side of the law, or (b) go to sleep. After an hour, the latter won over." Brian Courtis from The Age: wrote "Its banal dialogue and the unnecessarily complicated plot exposition are not improved by director Robert Meillon's woeful mishandling. Meillon seems to have controlled this disaster like an orchestra conductor with his hands tied behind his back." He also stated that it "does for television drama what Sale of the Century does for the arts".

TV Week movie critic Ivan Hutchinson gave it one out of four stars, but called it an "interesting thriller" and said “viewers should not necessarily be discouraged by the fact that the planned series failed to eventuate. Decisions about the future of series are not always made on the grounds of quality."
