= Brothers (1982 film) =

- Promotional poster
- Based on: Reflex by Roger Ward
- Screenplay by: Terry Bourke; Roger Ward
- Directed by: Terry Bourke
- Starring: Ivar Kants; Chard Hayward; Jennifer Cluff; Margaret Laurence
- Music by: Bob Young
- Country of origin: Australia
- Original language: English

Production
- Executive producers: Brock Halliday; Frank Wilkie
- Producer: Terry Bourke
- Cinematography: Ray Henman
- Editor: Ron Williams
- Running time: 103 minutes
- Production company: Areflex Pictures
- Budget: $1.2 million

Original release
- Release: 25 September 1982

Brothers is a 1982 Australian drama television film directed by Terry Bourke. It includes a re-enactment of the 1975 murder of the Balibo Five in East Timor.

== Plot ==
Five Australian journalists are killed in East Timor during the 1975 uprising. Two brothers, Kevin and Adam, survive the incident. Years later, Kevin is living in a small town in New Zealand, engaged to Jenine. Adam arrives to persuade Kevin to return to journalism. Adam begins a romantic relationship with Lani.

Adam and Lani break up after he is beaten up by toughs in a fight that Adam could have avoided. Adam gets with another woman, Alison. Lani becomes a prostitute and tries to kill herself. Adam comes to see Kevin and discovers that Lani has had a complete breakdown and the entire town where Kevin lives hates Adam. A mob of people arrive to beat up Adam but Kevin does it.

Later a bus carrying Alison is driving along. Adam follows. The bus crashes and Alison is killed.

== Cast ==
- Chard Hayward as Adam Wild
- Ivar Kants as Kevin Wild
- Margaret Laurence as Lani Aveson
- Jennifer Cluff as Alison Lewis
- Alyson Best as Jenine Williams
- Joan Bruce as Mrs Williams
- Les Foxcroft as Jim Williams
- James Elliott as Rev. Maynard
- Ricky May as Billy
- Ken Wayne as bureau chief
- Moira Walker as Connie Aveson

=== The Timor Five ===
- Desmond Tester as journalist one
- John Garwood as journalist two
- Roger Ward as cameraman one
- Ken Metcalfe as cameraman two
- Barry Adler as sound recordist

== Production ==
The script was based on a novel Reflex by Australian actor and writer Roger Ward. It was about a photojournalist in Vietnam inspired by Sean Flynn. Ward almost got up a film based on the novel in the early 70s with Jack Thompson in the lead but it did not happen. Ward spent the next few years trying to set up the film elsewhere. In late 1979 it was announced he would make the film in New Zealand in February 1980 in New Zealand with Perth doctor Jon Sainken. Ward eventually sold the project to Terry Bourke, who rewrote Ward's script extensively.

The movie was shot in the Philippines, Taihape and Narrabeen.

== Release ==
The movie had its world premiere in Taihape, New Zealand.

The film was not released in Australian cinemas but was screened on television. Roger Ward is trying to get funding for a new version of his novel.
