= Roger Ward =

Australian actor (born 1936)

- Born: 24 July 1937 (age 89); Adelaide, South Australia, Australia
- Occupation: Actor
- Known for: See filmography
- Height: 1.91 m (6 ft 3 in)

Roger Ward (born 24 July 1937) is an Australian actor and scriptwriter who has had a considerable career in film and television, noted for "tough guy" roles in which he often did his own stunts.

== Biography ==
Ward was born in Adelaide, South Australia in 1937.

His career began at an early age with roles on stage and radio. In his late teens he travelled to Tahiti to begin writing what became the controversial novel and film, The Set. The film was produced in 1970 but the novel was not published until 2011.

He was script editor for Homicide, adapted his novel Reflex into the film Brothers and wrote other documentaries and specials. Ward has appeared in over one hundred television shows and films, some of which featured stars such as Marlon Brando, Trevor Howard, Richard Harris, Barry Sullivan, Robert Lansing, Ryan O'Neal, Richard Benjamin, Tom Selleck, Paula Prentiss, Peter Graves, Alan Rickman, Steve Railsback, Olivia Hussey and Laura San Giacomo.

In Stone (1974) he played the comedic biker Hooks and in The Man From Hong Kong (1975) he played bumbling Australian policeman Bob Taylor. In The Irishman (1978) he was an Irish mounted policeman, and in Mad Max (1979), he played the police hall captain Fifi. Turkey Shoot (1982) saw him as Ritter the guard from hell, and in The Pirate Movie (1982) he was an all-singing, dancing pirate. In Quigley Down Under (1990) he played Brophy, one of the outlaw gang.

He played popular characters in TV series including long-running character Frank 'Weppo' Smith, the Shakespeare-spouting garbage collector in Number 96, who has a romance with Norma Whittaker (Sheila Kennelly) a boxer in Boys from the Bush and also appeared in The Sullivans.

Later independent films in which he was featured include Long Weekend (2008), Bad Behaviour (2010), the remake of Turkey Shoot (2014), Boar (2017) and The Faceless Man (2018).

He has a prominent role in the upcoming Indian film Thariode: The Lost City directed by Nirmal Baby Varghese.

== Filmography ==
=== Film ===
Year	Title	Role	Type
1961	Nude Odyssey (aka Odissea Nuda)	Beachcomber (uncredited)	Feature film
1962	Mutiny on the Bounty	Uncredited	Feature film
1966	They're a Weird Mob	Bloke at end of bar (uncredited)	Feature film
1969	You Can't See 'round Corners	Punter (uncredited)	Feature film
1969	It Takes All Kinds	Bodyguard	Feature film
1970	The Set	Dancer at Party	Feature film
1970	Squeeze a Flower	Bosun	Feature film
1970	Adam's Woman	Flogger (uncredited)	Feature film
1971	The Tony Hancock Special	Pete	TV movie
1973	Dalmas	Policeman	Feature film
1974	Moving On	Stock Agent	Feature film
1974	Stone	Hooks	Feature
1974	Stoner (aka Tie jin gang da po zi yang guan)	Motorcycle Thug (uncredited)	Feature film
1975	The Man from Hong Kong	Bob Taylor	Feature film
1976	Mad Dog Morgan	Trooper	Feature film
1976	Deathcheaters	1st Police Sergeant	Feature film
1976	Me and Mr Thorne	Hedge	TV movie
1976	Rate of Exchange		Short film
1977	No Room to Run	Delivery Man	TV movie
1977	High Rolling	Lol	Feature film
1977	The Irishman	Kevin Quilty	Feature film
1979	Mad Max	Captain Fifi Macaffee	Feature film
1980	Touch and Go	Wrestler	Feature film
1980	The Chain Reaction	Moose	Feature film
1981	Lady Stay Dead	Officer Clyde Collings	Feature film
1981	I Can Jump Puddles	Peter McLeod	TV movie
1981	The Squad (aka The Homicide Squad)	Det Sgt Vernon Dangerfield	TV movie
1982	Turkey Shoot	Chief Guard Ritter	Feature film
1982	Sara Dane	Johnny Pigman	TV movie
1982	The Pirate Movie	Pirate	Feature film
1982	Brothers	Cameraman One	Feature film
1985	Shout! The Story of Johnny O'Keefe	Police Sergeant	TV movie
1988	Sands of the Bedouin		TV movie
1988	The Tourist		TV movie
1988	Young Einstein	Cat Pie Cook	Feature film
1988	Barracuda	Bill 'The Dentist'	TV movie
1990	Quigley Down Under	Brophy	Feature film
1991	Fatal Bond	Detective Greaves	Feature film
1991	Pirates Island	Slavemaster	TV movie
1991	Dusty Hearts		Short film
1995	Rough Diamonds	Merv Drysdale	Feature film
1997	The Gift	Removalist #1	Short film
1997	Life and Death		Short film
2001	When Good Ghouls Go Bad	Cheesy the Clown	TV movie
2008	Long Weekend	Truckie	Feature film
2010	Bad Behaviour	Voyte	Feature film
2010	The Mighty Hand of God	Him	Short film
2014	Turkey Shoot	The Dictator	Feature film
2015	Observance	Conspirator	
2017	Boar	Blue	Feature film
2018	Are You Scared Yet?	Gentleman Caller	Feature film
2018	The Faceless Man	King Dougie	Feature film
2019	Choir Girl	William Millard	Feature film
2019	The Shinjuku Five	Papa Cosgrove	Feature film
2020	Dusters	Welles	Short film
2020	Limbo	Merrin	Short film
2021	Jane	Mr Gordon	Short film
2022	The Debt Collector	Jimmie O'Hare	Feature film
2023	What About Sal?	Daisy	Feature film
TBA	Disease X: The Zombie Experiment		Feature film
TBA	Death's Waiting Room	Bertie	Feature film (post-production)
TBA	Thariode: The Lost City		Pre-production

=== Television ===
Year	Title	Role	Type
1965	The Stranger		TV miniseries, 1 episode
1966	Australian Playhouse	Constable Broughton	TV series, 2 episodes
1967-73	Homicide	Ray Sullivan / Wolf Kauffman / George Mason / Edwards / Bill Armstrong / Tony Moran / Ted Jacobs / Greg Toomey / Wilf Walls / Harry Parr	TV series, 10 episodes
1968	Hunter	Humphrey Wilding	TV series, 1 episode
1968	Vega 4	Tritonian	TV miniseries
1968	The Adventurers		TV series
1968	Skippy the Bush Kangaroo	Carver	TV series, episode: "Tread Lightly"
1969	Riptide	Sergeant / Denzil Webb	TV series, 2 episodes
1969-72	Division 4	Buster Bell / Bruce 'Hammer' Hamilton / Eddie Walsh / Max Gillies / Stevens	TV series, 5 episodes
1972	The Spoiler	Keith	TV series, 1 episode
1972	Boney	Comstable Barnard	TV series, 1 episode
1973	Ryan	Don	TV series, 1 episode
1973	The Evil Touch		TV series, 1 episode
1974	Flash Nick from Jindavick	Sergeant Carson 1	TV series, 2 episodes
1974	Silent Number	Dan Lane	TV series, 2 episodes
1971-75	Matlock Police	Barry Hawkins / Jack Lewis / Lennie Williams / Wally Moran / Norm Quinn / Mick Smith	TV series, 6 episodes
1975-76	Number 96	Frank 'Weppo' Smith	TV series, 46 episodes
1976	Alvin Purple	Chicka	TV series, 1 episode
1976	The Outsiders	Dallas	TV series, 1 episode
1978	Chopper Squad	Security Guard	TV series, 1 episode
1979	Doctor Down Under	Mr. Phillips	TV series, 1 episode
1980	Young Ramsay	Phil Angel	TV series, 1 episode
1980	Home Sweet Home	Billy	TV series, 1 episode
1977	Cop Shop	Leon Turner / Bailey / Garry Dwyer	TV series, 5 episodes
1981	I Can Jump Puddles	Peter McLeod	TV miniseries, 1 episode
1981	Bellamy	Rafe	TV series, 1 episode
1982	Sara Dane	Johnny Pigman	TV miniseries, 3 episodes
1984	Inside Straight	Sid	TV series, 1 episode
1984	Special Squad	Bill Foster / Peaches	TV series, 2 episodes
1984	Carson's Law	Algernon 'Slammer' McQuade	TV series, 3 episodes
1985	Runaway Island	Pastor Braithwaite	TV series, 2 episodes
1985	Winners	Fergus	TV series, 1 episode
1985	Shout! The Story of Johnny O'Keefe	Police Sergeant	TV miniseries, 2 episodes
1986	Professor Poopsnagle's Steam Zeppelin	Blaggard	TV series, 4 episodes
1986	A Fortunate Life	Martin	TV miniseries, 1 episode
1987	Willing and Abel	Mr Dancer	TV series, 1 episode
1987	Fields of Fire	Bull	TV miniseries, 2 episodes
1987	Poor Man's Orange	Mr Kilroy	TV miniseries, 2 episodes
1988	Mission: Impossible	Wilson	TV series, 1 episode
1988-89	Rafferty's Rules	Albert Potts	TV series, 2 episodes
1992	Boys from the Bush	Rocko	TV series, 1 episode
1988-93	A Country Practice	Pat O' Connor / Inspector Poulos / Stan Plummer / Bill Hammond / Burrigan 2 (Police Radio Operator)	TV series, 6 episodes
1997	Big Sky	Barney	TV series, 1 episode
1997	Water Rats	Jim Lockwood	TV series, 2 episodes
1997	Heartbreak High	Jon Pavlovic	TV series, 1 episode
2020	Lion's Den	Thomas E. Shirley	TV series, 3 episodes
2021	Axmo Deus	Lou Sither	TV series, 1 episode
2023	Celebrity House Cleaner	Action Movie Star	TV series, 1 episode

== Accolades ==
Ward won Best Supporting Actor at the Melbourne Underground Film Festival for his role in Bad Behaviour.
