= Monique Noel =

American glamour model and actress (born 1967)

Playboy centerfold appearance
- May 1989
- Preceded by: Jennifer Lyn Jackson
- Succeeded by: Tawnni Cable

Personal details
- Born: April 28, 1967 (age 59) Salem, Oregon, U.S.
- Height: 5 ft 7 in (1.70 m)

Monique Noel (born April 28, 1967) is a glamour model and actress. She was chosen as Playboy's Playmate of the Month for May 1989. Her centerfold was photographed by Richard Fegley. She was born in Salem Oregon.

== Partial filmography ==
- Renegade (1996) as Cheri
- I Like to Play Games (1995) as Valerie
- Blossom (1993) as Claire
- Herman's Head (1993) as Gigi
- Meatballs 4 (1992) as Lovelie #1 (as Monique de Lacy)
- Mobsters (1991) as Showgirl (as Monique Noel Lovelace)
- Road House (1989) as Barfly
- Bert Rigby, You're a Fool (1989) as Jim Shirley's Girlfriend
- What Price Victory (1988)

== See also ==
- List of people in Playboy 1980–1989

Fawna MacLaren	Simone Eden	Laurie Wood	Jennifer Lyn Jackson	Monique Noel	Tawnni Cable
Erika Eleniak	Gianna Amore	Karin and Mirjam van Breeschooten	Karen Foster	Renee Tenison	Petra Verkaik
