= Andrew Clarke (actor) =

Australian actor

- Born: 1954 (age 71–72); Adelaide, South Australia, Australia
- Education: National Institute of Dramatic Art; Flinders University
- Occupation: Actor
- Years active: 1969–present
- Known for: Anzacs (1985); Sword of Honour (1986); Snowy River: The McGregor Saga (1994–1996)

Andrew Clarke (born 1954) is an Australian actor most known for his television work in the 1980s and 1990s. He is also a two-time Logie winner.

== Early life ==
Clarke was born in 1954 in Adelaide, South Australia. He is a graduate of Sydney's National Institute of Dramatic Art (NIDA), where he studied acting. He also has a Bachelor of Education in Drama, which he studied at Adelaide's Flinders University.

== Career ==
Andrew Clarke began his career in theatre in Adelaide in 1969. His stage credits include Macbeth, The Winter's Tale, Arsenic and Old Lace, The Cherry Orchard, Long Day's Journey into Night, The Glass Menagerie, The Devil's Advocate, Waiting for Godot and Under Milk Wood. He also performed in The Land of Smiles for the State Opera Company of South Australia and the musicals Norman Lindsay and his Push in Bohemia, Paint Your Wagon, Oliver! and Errol Flynn's Great Big Adventure Book for Boys.

In 1981, Clarke landed a recurring role, as Max Saunders in Cop Shop. That same year, he appeared opposite John Gregg and Frank Gallacher in Crawford Productions' first Sydney-based series, the crime drama Homicide Squad. Unimpressed with the pilot, the Seven Network waited to broadcast it after the end of the ratings season, and the series was not picked up past that point.

In 1982, Clarke had a short stint in cult soap opera Prisoner, in which he played the role of Judy Bryant's son-in-law Geoff Maynard. That same year, he played the role of Mike Brent in short-lived drama Taurus Rising, billed as an Australian alternative to Dallas and Dynasty, but the series was cancelled after only 21 episodes. He then played the regular ongoing role of Terry Hansen in soap opera Sons and Daughters, and appeared in Nine Network police drama Waterloo Station, both from 1983.

Clarke landed the lead role of Martin Barrington, opposite Paul Hogan in 1985 big-budget miniseries Anzacs, about Australian troops' exploits in Gallipoli during World War I. His performance won him the 1986 Silver Logie Award for Best Actor. He also had a major role as Charles Ulm in 1985 miniseries A Thousand Skies, about Australian aviation pioneer Charles Kingsford Smith. He followed this with a lead role in 1986 miniseries Sword of Honour, playing Vietnam soldier Tony Lawrence, which won him another Logie Award for Best Actor the following year.

Clarke was in contention for the role of James Bond in 1987 Bond film The Living Daylights. He was offered the contract, but says it "was just so abysmal I couldn’t accept it", and instead, Timothy Dalton was cast. That same year, he appeared in the 1987 comedy film Les Patterson Saves the World, opposite Barry Humphries, and had a starring role as sleuth Simon Templar in The Saint in Manhattan. The pilot episode aired on CBS, but did not make the schedule; instead, the network decided to show it and put it to the viewer vote. While callers voted overwhelmingly in favour, the show did not fare well against the other networks that night, so CBS did not purchase further episodes.

Clarke co-starred with Donna Mills as Bill Wellesley in 1988 American comedy/drama TV film Outback Bound, about a girl from the States who travels to the Australian outback to find her father's opal mine. In 1990, Clarke starred in Seven Network miniseries Flair, opposite Heather Thomas, Rowena Wallace and Bud Tingwell and Nine Network miniseries The Private War of Lucinda Smith, starring Nigel Havers. That same year, he began an ongoing role (until 1992) in sci-fi family series The Girl from Tomorrow, playing the role of James Rooney.

In 1991, Clarke secured the lead role in The Adventures of Skippy, as the adult incarnation of Sonny Hammond (the twelve year old boy from the original 1960s series), now an adult with children of his own and working as head of a wildlife park in Queensland. By this time. Skippy had become more of a family pet than the wild kangaroo of the original series. Devised as a sequel to the 1960s version, The Adventures of Skippy was short-lived and only ran for one season with 39 episodes.

Clarke then secured a high-profile role as patriarch Matt McGregor in the series Banjo Paterson's The Man From Snowy River (Snowy River: The McGregor Saga), whom he played for four seasons, from 1993 to 1996. He starred alongside Wendy Hughes and Guy Pearce. After the series finished, Clarke was out of work for a couple of years before landing the regular role of Sergeant Colin Decker in Network 10 legal series State Coroner, reuniting once again with his Snowy River co-star, Hughes. He starred as Gary Preston in "A Murder of Crows" – a 1999 episode of the fourth season of Halifax f.p., and the following year, had a role in SeaChange.

Clarke went on to portray English actor and director Laurence Olivier in Blonde, a fictional biographical 2001 TV movie about Marilyn Monroe. He appeared alongside Poppy Montgomery and Richard Roxburgh as well as American actors Patrick Dempsey, Kirstie Alley and Ann-Margret. That same year, he also appeared in Dalkeith, a film about retirement home residents who purchase a greyhound. From 2001 to 2003, Clarke played the regular role of real estate agent Derek Unn on drama comedy series Always Greener. Then in late 2005, he completed a four month stint on long-running soap opera Neighbours, playing Susan Kennedy's husband Alex Kinski, before his character was killed off.

In 2012, Clarke had a role in horror film 6 Plots, opposite Ryan Corr and Eliza Taylor. He then appeared in biographical docudrama Tom Wills, portraying Horatio Wills, father of cricketer and Australian rules football pioneer Tom Wills. It was first screened publicly in 2014 and had its television debut in 2016.

== Personal life ==
In the mid-1990s, Clarke was romantically involved with British actress Victoria Tennant, when they appeared together in Snowy River: The McGregor Saga. Tennant subsequently split with then-husband, American actor Steve Martin, to be with Clarke.

Clarke played football at a high level, and is also a keen tennis player and long distance runner.

== Filmography ==
=== Television ===
Year	Title	Role	Type	Ref
1981	Cop Shop	Max Saunders / Mervyn Young	12 episodes	
1981	The Sullivans	Detective King	4 episodes	
1981	The Homicide Squad (aka The Squad)	Detective Ambrose Alexander	TV movie	
1982	Prisoner	Geoff Maynard	5 episodes	
1982	Sara Dane	Arrogant Officer	Miniseries, 1 episode	
1982	Taurus Rising	Mike Brent		
1983	A Country Practice	Des Ward	2 episodes	
1983–1984	Waterloo Station	Chris Cooper		
1983–1984	Sons and Daughters	Terry Hansen	99 episodes	
1985	Anzacs	Martin Barrington	Miniseries, 5 episodes	
1985	A Thousand Skies	Charles Ulm	Miniseries, 3 episodes	
1986	The Fast Lane	Bill	1 episode	
1986	Sword of Honour	Tony Lawrence	Miniseries, 4 episodes	
1987	The Saint in Manhattan	Simon Templar	TV pilot	
1987	The Last of the Mohicans	Voice	Animated TV movie	
1988	Outback Bound	Bill Wellesley	TV movie	
1989	Rafferty's Rules	Peter Rudd	1 episode	
1989	E Street	Dr Ben Stewart	1 episode	
1989, 1990	Mission: Impossible	Carter / Captain O'Neill	2 episodes	
1990	Flair	Philip Harmon	Miniseries, 2 episodes	
1991	The Private War of Lucinda Smith	Lieutenant Andrews	Miniseries	
1991	For the Love of Mike	Geoffrey Masters	1 episode	
1991–1992	The Girl from Tomorrow	Mr James Rooney	Miniseries, 24 episodes	
1992	The Adventures of Skippy	Sonny Hammond	39 episodes	
1994–1996	The Man From Snowy River (aka Snowy River: The McGregor Saga)	Matt McGregor	Seasons 1-4, 65 episodes	
1995	Frontline	Ed Forbes, the Executive Producer	1 episode	
1998	State Coroner	Det Sgt Colin Docker	14 episodes	
1999	Halifax f.p.	Gary Preston	1 episode	
1999	High Flyers	Sergeant Saunders	1 episode	
2000	SeaChange	Dave Drury	1 episode	
2001	Crash Zone	Keenan Reid	1 episode	
2001	Blonde	Laurence Olivier	Miniseries	
2001–2003	Always Greener	Derek Unn	38 episodes	
2002	Blue Heelers	Digby Riggs	1 episode	
2004	Fergus McPhail	Ben Cameron	2 episodes	
2005	Neighbours	Alex Kinski	11 episodes	
2011	Killing Time	Geoff Flatman	1 episode	
2011	Wild Boys	Trap #2 (also Captain Gunpowder's stunt double)	2 episodes	
2014	The Doctor Blake Mysteries	Brendan Ross	1 episode	
2015	Glitch	Don Sharp	1 episode	
2016	Tom Wills	Horatio Wills	TV movie	

=== Film ===
Year	Title	Role	Type	Ref
1987	Les Patterson Saves the World	Neville Thonge	Feature film	
2000	Her Iliad	Frank	Short film	
2001	Dalkeith	Judge Proctor	Feature film	
2012	6 Plots	Gary Hart	Feature film	

== Theatre ==
Year	Title	Role	Notes	Ref
	Norman Lindsay			
	Paint Your Wagon			
	Oliver!			
	Errol Flynn			
	Macbeth			
	The Winter's Tale			
	The Cherry Orchard			
	Long Day's Journey into Night			
	The Glass Menagerie			
	Waiting for Godot			
1969	And now it's time for boys and girls everywhere to wash their faces and hands, brush their teeth, kiss mother and dad, and OFF TO BED!		Union Hall, Adelaide	
1970	The Devil's Advocate		Arts Theatre, Adelaide with Adelaide Repertory Theatre	
1972	Much Ado About Nothing	Friar Francis	New Fortune Theatre, Perth with Undergraduate Dramatic Society	
1976	Well Hung		Sheridan Theatre, Adelaide with Adelaide Theatre Group	
1976	Old King Cole	Cyril	Playhouse, Adelaide with South Australian Theatre Co	
1977	Errol Flynn's Great Big Adventure Book for Boys		Sheridan Theatre, Adelaide with The Stage Co	
1980	Norman Lindsay and his Push in Bohemia		Small Price Theatre, Adelaide with The Stage Co	
1980	Under Milk Wood		SA tour, Theatre 62, Adelaide with The Stage Co	
1980	The Land of Smiles	General Goetz / Hum Yen	Her Majesty's Theatre, Adelaide with State Opera of South Australia	
1985	The Coronation of Poppea	Nero	Anthill Theatre, Melbourne with Australian Nouveau Theatre	
1991	Arsenic and Old Lace		Sydney Opera House, Laycock St Theatre, Gosford with Peter & Ellen Williams	

== Awards ==
Year	Work	Award	Category	Result	Ref
1986	Anzacs	Logie Awards	Most Popular Actor in a Miniseries	Won	
1987	Sword of Honour	Logie Awards	Most Popular Actor in a Miniseries	Won	
