= The Saint in Manhattan =

- Based on: Character created by Leslie Charteris
- Written by: Peter Gethers; David Handler
- Directed by: James Frawley
- Starring: Andrew Clarke; Kevin Tighe; George Rose
- Music by: Mark Snow
- Country of origin: United States
- Original language: English
- No. of episodes: 1

Production
- Executive producers: Dennis E. Doty; Robert S. Baker
- Producer: George Manasse
- Cinematography: William Wages
- Editor: Lee Burch
- Running time: 60 minutes

Original release
- Network: CBS
- Release: June 12, 1987

Related
- Return of the Saint

The Saint in Manhattan is a 1987 television pilot for an Australian-filmed, American-backed revival series based on The Saint starring Andrew Clarke as Simon Templar. The pilot was not picked up for a series but on June 12, 1987, it was broadcast as the first installment of CBS Summer Playhouse, a series that aired unsold television pilots during the summer season. In 2012, the pilot was released on DVD by Madman Entertainment in Australia. The DVD has since been out of print.

== Plot ==
The Saint returns to New York City, feeling restless and bored. But the tedium is about to escalate to full-blown excitement when he is contacted by an old flame, Margo, a ballerina who is set to star in a high-profile performance. She has received death threats in the guise of a mutilated doll being left in her dressing room, and as part of the ballet, she will don a million-dollar tiara on opening night. The performance goes without mishap, however, upon leaving the stage the tiara has somehow been swapped with a fake, and The Saint's calling card has been left in its empty box. Someone has framed Simon, and his old adversary Inspector Fernack is quick to point the finger.

== Production ==
The pilot was shot in Manhattan in April 1987.

== Cast ==
- Andrew Clarke as Simon Templar
- Kevin Tighe as Inspector John Fernack
- George Rose as Woods
- Christopher Marcantel as Joey
- Holland Taylor as Fran Grogan
- Caitlin Clarke as Lily Palmer/Jessica Daniels
- Liliana Komorowska as Margot Katka

== Reception ==
The Sydney Morning Herald wrote that Andrew Clarke was not well suited for the role, especially in contrast to Roger Moore in the 1967 television series. The Los Angeles Times reported that most of the viewers who watched the pilot on CBS Summer Playhouse voted "yes". Despite this, the series was never picked up.

Critics also compared The Saint's physical appearance to Thomas Magnum in Magnum, P.I., especially with his mustache. Also, the black Lamborghini Countach 5000QV used by The Saint was compared to Magnum's red Ferrari 308 GTS.
