= Brian Wright (writer) =

Australian television and radio writer

- Born: 1918; Australia
- Died: 2013 (aged 94–95)
- Occupations: Writer, announcer, producer, director
- Notable work: Spyforce

Brian Wright (1918–2013) was an Australian writer, announcer, producer, and director best known for his work on TV and radio. He co-created Spyforce.
