= Outback Bound =

- Genre: comedy-drama
- Written by: Luciano Comici; Elizabeth Comici
- Directed by: John Llewellyn Moxey
- Starring: Donna Mills; Andrew Clarke; John Meillon; John Schneider
- Music by: Miles Goodman
- Country of origin: United States
- Original language: English

Production
- Executive producer: Robert Silberling
- Producer: Andrew Gottlieb
- Cinematography: Paul Murphy
- Editor: Ray Daniels
- Production companies: Andrew Gottlieb Productions; CBS Entertainment Production

Original release
- Network: CBS
- Release: October 11, 1988

Outback Bound is a 1988 American television film about a snooty Beverly Hills woman who goes to outback Australia.

== Cast ==
- Donna Mills as Samantha 'Sam' Hollings
- Andrew Clarke as Bill Wellesley
- John Meillon as Nobby
- John Schneider as Jim Tully
- Chard Hayward as David
- Bartholomew John as Newsreader
- Joanna Lockwood as Fiona
- Colette Mann as Edith Fraser
