= Champagne and Bullets =

1993 American independent action film

- Case art from the Vinegar Syndrome Blu-ray release
- Directed by: John De Hart
- Written by: John De Hart
- Produced by: John De Hart
- Starring: John De Hart; Wings Hauser; Pamela Bryant
- Release date: 1993
- Running time: 99 minutes (Champagne and Bullets cut)
- Country: United States
- Language: English

Champagne and Bullets (also known as Road to Revenge and GetEven) is an independent 1993 action movie, starring, written, and directed by John De Hart. Described as a vanity project, Champagne and Bullets has become a cult movie due to De Hart's amateur and "inexplicable" performance. Contemporary reviewers have celebrated the film as a "classic" B-movie.

== History ==
According to Vinegar Syndrome, the film was originally edited as Champagne and Bullets in 16 mm but never commercially released. The film was re-edited several times and released as Road to Revenge and GetEven.

The first video version is 10 minutes shorter than the original film, while the 2007 version was also substantially edited and augmented with erotic scenes (although several depictions of sexual assaults were removed), among other things.

== Plot ==
In Southern California, Rick Bode, a former cop, tries to rebuild his life after being forced off the police force by his corrupt superior, Normad. His one-time partner Huck Finney still harbors resentment, their friendship hanging by a thread after Huck's descent into alcoholism following his wife's murder.

At a bar one evening, Rick takes the stage to perform a country line dance song, “Shimmy Slide”, drawing laughs and heckles from a drunken Huck. Among the crowd is Cindy, a woman trying to escape her troubled past. After the show, Rick and Cindy talk, and a spark of romance begins.

Meanwhile, Normad has ascended to even greater influence. By day, he has been appointed as a judge. By night, he presides over a satanic cult. In a candle-lit warehouse, Normad, his mistress, and his worshipers sacrifice a woman in a blood ritual. It is revealed that the cult was responsible for the murder of Huck's wife. The trauma has left Huck consumed by grief and resentment, both toward Normad and toward Rick for moving on without him.

Rick and Cindy’s relationship blossoms. They spend time riding horseback, going on quiet outings, and trying to put their past struggles behind them. Cindy confides about her history of abuse and exploitation, while Rick comforts her, promising that she’s safe with him. Their bond deepens until Rick proposes marriage, and the two wed in a modest ceremony. However, Rick continues to be shadowed by Normad's minions, who also begin watching Cindy. When Cindy is attacked one night by Normad’s thugs, Rick is forced into a street fight to protect her. Though he fends them off, the attack makes it clear that Normad won’t stop until Rick is destroyed.

Rick turns to Huck for help, but Huck refuses. Their arguments leave their friendship shattered, with Huck telling Rick he’s insane to take on Normad again. Not long after, Rick finds himself in court. Normad’s influence has dragged him into legal trouble, and Cindy is called to the stand. Under questioning, she reveals painful details about her past, and her words are twisted to make her look unstable. The attack on her character leaves her shaken. Normad's mistress takes the stand, bolstering his claims and defaming Rick as reckless and untrustworthy. Rick leaves furious, Cindy humiliated, and the legal route to defeating Normad closed off for good.

Normad escalates his campaign. His cult conducts more rituals, his men vandalize Rick’s home, and Cindy is left terrified. Rick decides there is no turning back — Normad must be confronted directly. Huck, seeing how far Rick is willing to go, finally gets sober and shows up on Rick’s doorstep, ready to join the fight. The pair storm Normad's lair, gunning down the cultists. Huck is wounded in the fight but refuses to back down, covering Rick as he pushes deeper into the compound. At last, Rick confronts Normad. After a gunfight and hand-to-hand struggle, Rick prevails, killing Normad and ending his reign of terror once and for all.

With Normad dead, the cult collapses. His mistress flees, powerless without him. Rick finds Cindy and embraces her, relieved that the nightmare is over. Huck, bloodied but alive, finally makes peace, his wife’s murder avenged. As Rick and Cindy drive away, they look ahead to a future free from Normad’s corruption, while Huck at last finds a measure of redemption.

== Cast ==
- John De Hart as Rick Bode
- Pamela Bryant as Cindy
- Wings Hauser as Huck
- William Smith as Normad, The Cult Leader
- Al Sapienza as Drug Smuggler
- Lisa Boyle as Lisa (credited as Cassandra Leigh)

== Reception ==
Horror Society said, "What makes this one so much fun is how bad and awkward it is to watch. Overall, Champagne and Bullets is The Room of direct to video action flicks. It’s one of the strangest yet wildest movies I had ever seen yet I couldn’t stop watching"

Writing for Blu-ray.com, Brian Orndorf states that the film "is lunacy when it isn't incredibly boring and indulgent, quickly ascending to Bad Movie Night heaven."

The B-movie website Nanarland places the film among the most notable vanity projects in the film industry.

After Wings Hauser's death in 2025, MovieWeb wrote that Champagne and Bullets was "one of the most unhinged performances of his entire career," and that he delivered memorable performances in even low-budget or "Z-grade" movies.

The podcast "How Did This Get Made" featured the movie, with all three titles included, on their 21 August 25 show. Describing the movie, "If you love The Room, Samurai Cop, & Birdemic, then you won’t want to miss the 1993 self-funded indie action-drama Champagne & Bullets (aka GetEven aka Road to Revenge)"
