= I Like to Play Games =

- Directed by: Moctezuma Lobato
- Written by: David Keith Miller
- Produced by: Vivian Mayhew; Nick Zuvic
- Starring: Lisa Boyle; Ken Steadman; Jennifer Burton; Monique Noel; Cheryl Rixon
- Cinematography: Kim Haun
- Edited by: Josh Kanin
- Music by: Herman Beeftink
- Production companies: Cameo Films, Inc.
- Distributed by: A-Pix Entertainment
- Release date: September 15, 1995 (USA Video Premiere)
- Running time: 95 minutes
- Country: United States
- Language: English

I Like to Play Games is a 1995 American softcore erotic drama film that was directed by Moctezuma Lobato and written by David Keith Miller. It stars Lisa Boyle and Ken Steadman, with Jennifer Burton, Monique Noel, and Cheryl Rixon also featured in the cast. Released on September 15, 1995, the film was followed in 1999 by I Like to Play Games Too.

== Plot ==
Michael (Ken Steadman) is looking for a woman who likes to play games, but when he finds Suzanne (Lisa Boyle), he discovers that she may be more than he bargained for. Once Michael meets Suzanne, they strike up a relationship, which proves to be intense. Their first date takes them first to a restaurant, then into an alley where they fool around for a bit. They go back to his place to fool around some more. She then leaves. The next day, both attend a business meeting, during which Suzanne plays footsie with Michael. They return to his residence to fool around in his bathtub, then move onto his bed to fool around some more. But Suzanne flees and boards a taxi. This causes Michael, still naked under a bathrobe, to run after the cab taking Suzanne away. Arrested for indecent exposure, Michael places two telephone calls seeking release on bail. The first, to Suzanne, is without success. The second, to Nick (James DiZazzo), one of his friends, yields results. Suzanne then lures Michael to a motel bed and leaves him cuffed there to the bed naked while she leaves to go back to work to attend a meeting. She returns to him and they have sex on the motel bed.

== Cast ==
- Lisa Boyle as Suzanne
- Ken Steadman as Michael
- Jennifer Burton as Tiffany
- Monique Noel as Valerie
- Cheryl Rixon as Sean
- James DiZazzo as Nick
- Pamela Dickerson as Melody
- Toshiya Agata as Kobe
- Tom Druzbick as Lochran
- Brittney Kwon as Asian Girl
- Cappuccino Moore as Jack
- Kenneth Roussell as Alexei

== Releases ==
The film had international video and television releases: Brazilian Portuguese as O Jogo do Sexo (TV), and as Seduzidos Pelo Jogo (video); Canadian (French title) Suzanne; Germany as Opfer der Lust (video) and as Verhängnisvolle Täuschung (TV); Spain as Una chica muy traviesa; In Finland as Esileikit and as Villit leikit; In the United Kingdom as the same title above; Italy as Mi piace giocare or Il gioco and Venezuela as Me gusta jugar.
