= More than This (TV series) =

- Genre: Drama
- Created by: Olivia Deeble; Luka Gracie
- Written by: Olivia Deeble
- Directed by: John Sheedy; Kate Gorman
- Starring: Olivia Deeble
- Composer: Kelly Ryall
- Country of origin: Australia
- Original language: English
- No. of seasons: 1
- No. of episodes: 6

Production
- Executive producers: Jason Haigh-Ellery; Kate Gorman; Charmaine Gorman; David Devjak; Bernadette O'Mahony
- Producers: Kate Gorman; Charmaine Gorman
- Cinematography: Brad Francis
- Editor: Michael Puglisi
- Camera setup: Multi-camera
- Running time: 24 minutes
- Production company: Baby Banksia

Original release
- Network: Paramount+
- Release: March 4, 2022

More Than This is an Australian drama television series that was released on Paramount+ on 4 March 2022. The series was written by teen actor Olivia Deeble and co-created with Luka Gracie, both of whom also star in this series. It also features Deeble's grandfather Reg Gorman in his final role. On June 11, 2025, it was announced that the show would stream on ABC iView.

== Premise ==
The series explores issues facing Australian teenagers, including bullying, body image, relationships and sexuality.

== Cast ==
- Olivia Deeble as Charlotte
- Bert Labonte as Mr E
- Luka Gracie as Jamie
- Kamil Ellis as Alexander
- Ellmir Asipi as Leon
- Josh Heuston as Sammy
- Oisin O’Leary as Benson
- Celine Ajobong as Legs (Alegra)
- Tharanya Tharan as Emma
- Selena Brincat as Zali
- Reg Gorman as Nuts
- Eve Morey as Caroline
- Syd Brisbane as Mark

== Episodes ==
| No. | Title | Directed by | Written by | Original release date |
|---|---|---|---|---|
| 1 | "Roll Call" | John Sheedy | Olivia Deeble | 4 March 2022 |
| 2 | "Alex" | John Sheedy | Olivia Deeble | 4 March 2022 |
| 3 | "Zali and Jamie" | John Sheedy | Olivia Deeble | 4 March 2022 |
| 4 | "Leon and Mr E" | Kate Gorman | Olivia Deeble | 4 March 2022 |
| 5 | "Charlotte" | Kate Gorman | Olivia Deeble | 4 March 2022 |
| 6 | "The Party" | Kate Gorman | Olivia Deeble | 4 March 2022 |
