= Olivia Deeble =

Australian actress and writer (born 2002)

- Born: Olivia Lillian Deeble; 4 August 2002 (age 24); Balwyn, Victoria, Australia
- Occupations: Actress, writer
- Years active: 2005–present
- Relatives: Kate Gorman (mother); Reg Gorman (grandfather)

Olivia Lillian Deeble (born 4 August 2002) is an Australian actress and writer. She is best known for her roles in the ABC Entertains series Little Lunch (2015–2016), the Seven Network soap opera Home and Away (2016–2019), and the Disney+ film Secret Society of Second-Born Royals (2020). She co-created and starred in the Paramount+ drama More Than This (2022).

== Early life and education ==
Olivia Lillian Deeble was born on 4 August 2002. She is from Balwyn, Victoria, a suburb of Melbourne. She is the daughter of actress Kate Gorman, and the granddaughter of actors Reg Gorman and Judith Roberts. She has a sister, Matilda, and a brother, Ewan.

While still in high school, she won the role of Raffy in Home and Away, so she moved in with her grandparents in Sydney and visited home twice a month, continuing to attend school while working 40-hour weeks.

== Career ==
Deeble's first major television role was Tamara Noodle in the children's mockumentary comedy Little Lunch. A year and a half later, she landed the role of Raffy Morrison on Home and Away, starring in over 200 episodes of the soap. In May 2019 finished filming with the show; her final scenes aired on 12 September 2019.

Deeble plays Princess Roxana in the Disney+ film Secret Society of Second-Born Royals. Production took place in May 2019 in Toronto, Canada.

In 2022, Deeble starred in the six-part drama series More Than This on Paramount+, which she wrote and co-created with Luka Gracie. The coming-of-age drama centres on five students and their teacher, played by Bert Labonte. The series is produced by Deeble's aunt Charmaine Gorman and mother Kate Gorman, who also co-directed the episodes with John Sheedy. Deeble worked on the show during the COVID-19 lockdown while she completed Year 12.

In 2024 Deeble appears in Alice Maio Mackay's horror film Carnage for Christmas.

In 2025 Deeble appears in the Miniseries The Imposter.

== Filmography ==
=== Film ===
Year	Title	Role	Notes
2005	You and Your Stupid Mate	Karen's Child #5	
2013	Roar!	Young Girl	Short film
2014	I Remember the Future	Jackie Burns	
2014	Go Fish	Chloe	Short film
2020	Secret Society of Second-Born Royals	Princess Roxana	
2024	Carnage for Christmas	Riley	
2026	Boyfiend	Simone	Short film
TBA	Don't Post That!	Maya	Post-production

=== Television ===
Year	Title	Role	Notes
2014	Creative Kids	Reporter	Recurring role
2015–2016	Little Lunch	Tamara Noodle	Main role
2016–2019	Home and Away	Raffy Morrison	Series regular
2022	More Than This	Charlotte	Main role; also co-creator and writer
2025	The Imposter	Eden	2 Episodes

== Awards and nominations ==
Year	Award	Category	Work	Result	Ref.
2018	Kids' Choice Awards	Favourite Aussie/Kiwi Rising Star	—N/a	Won	
