= Ken Steadman =

American actor (1969–1996)

- Born: Kenneth Keith Steadman; June 26, 1969; Aberdeen, Washington
- Died: September 20, 1996 (aged 27); Near Victorville, California, United States
- Other name: Keith Prince
- Occupations: Actor, model

Kenneth Keith Steadman (June 26, 1969 — September 20, 1996) was an American film and television actor.

He was born to parents Lisa Prince and Ken Steadman on June 26, 1969, in Aberdeen, Washington.

== Career ==
Steadman appeared in various film and television productions during the 1990s.

- Street Wars (1992)
- Beach Babes from Beyond (1993)
- Mirror Images 2 (1993)
- Indecent Behavior (1993)
- Baywatch (1993)
- I Like to Play Games (1995)
- Hindsight (1996)
- Moloney (1996)
- NYPD Blue (1996)
- Baywatch Nights (1996)
- Sliders (1996)

== Death ==
Steadman died, at age 27, in a dune-buggy accident during the production of the "Desert Storm" episode of the television series Sliders near Victorville, California.

While filming the episode, Steadman, who played the role of Cutter, was killed in an accident that occurred between takes. He was moving a dune buggy to the next shooting location. While he was moving the vehicle, the dune buggy overturned and crushed him, killing him instantly. According to Steadman's parents, his death was preventable.
