= Lisa Boyle =

American model (born 1964)

- Born: August 6, 1964 (age 62); Chicago, Illinois, U.S.
- Other names: Lisa D. Boyle; Lissa Boyle; Lisa Boyles; Cassandra Leigh; Cassandrea Leigh
- Occupations: Actress; model; photographer
- Years active: 1988–present
- Height: 5 ft 6 in (1.68 m)

Lisa Doreen Boyle (born August 6, 1964) is an American actress and model most known for her appearances in Playboy magazine and its various Special Editions. She is also a freelance photographer, shooting content for various publications.

== Early life ==
Boyle was born in Chicago, Illinois. She graduated from Chicago's Steinmetz High School in 1982. After high school, she headed off to Kailua, Hawaii, with a friend and worked as a waitress. A few months later, she returned to Chicago and for a short while before moving to Los Angeles. She ended up getting a job at a Hard Rock Cafe.

== Career ==
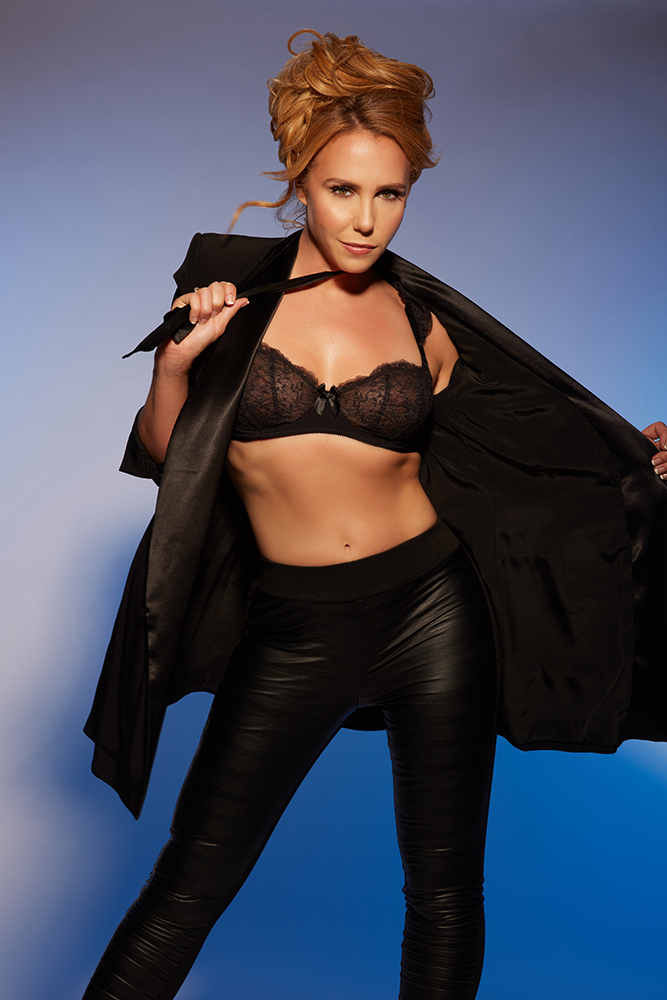
Picture of Holly Randall, taken by Lisa Boyle in 2016

Boyle started her acting career in 1988 with a part in Earth Girls Are Easy and had her first starring roles in 1994's Midnight Tease and the women in prison film Caged Heat 3000. She is sometimes credited as Lisa D. Boyle, Lissa Boyle, Lisa Boyles, Cassandra Leigh, or Cassandrea Leigh. She has appeared in several other movies, including cameos in Lost Highway, Bad Boys and Face/Off and more substantial roles in direct-to-video softcore movies including Cinemax's I Like to Play Games and Friend of the Family (1995) which helped cement her loyal following. In addition to movies, she has also appeared on TV shows such as Married... with Children (playing Fawn, one of Kelly Bundy's friends, in five episodes), Dream On, Silk Stalkings and The Hughleys. She has also appeared in several music videos, including Aerosmith's "Falling in Love (Is Hard on the Knees)" as well as Warren G's "I Shot the Sheriff".

After she broke up with her boyfriend, Boyle decided to become a nude model. She got an agent and within a month was signed up for Playboy magazine. She was asked to pose for the March/April 1995 edition of The Book of Lingerie. A long list of Books of Lingerie followed, and she appeared in more than 15 editions between 1995 and 2000, five of which were cover shots. In addition to Playboy, Boyle has also posed for Celebrity Skin, L'Equipe magazine, Access magazine and Loaded.

Boyle worked as a booth babe for Eidos Interactive at the 1999 Electronic Entertainment Expo (E3).

She was a still photographer in the TV show Chasing Farrah in 2005.

== Filmography ==
=== Films ===
Year	Film	Role	Director	Notes
1988	Earth Girls Are Easy	Curl Up and Dye Dancer	Julien Temple	Credited as Lisa D. Boyle
1993	Midnight Witness	Heidi	Peter Foldy	
1993	Champagne and Bullets	Lisa	John De Hart	Credited as Cassandra Leigh
1994	Midnight Tease	Samantha	Scott P. Levy	Direct-to-video release. Credited as Cassandra Leigh
1994	On the Edge	Janine	Anthony J. Christopher	Direct-to-video release. Credited as Lisa Boyles (sic)
1994	Concealed Weapon	Polish Emigree	Dave Payne and Milan Zivkovic	Credited as Cassandra Leigh
1995	Bad Boys	Girl Decoy	Michael Bay	
1995	Friend of the Family	Montana Stillman	Edward Holzman	Credited as Lissa Boyle (sic)
1995	Terminal Voyage	Veiled Woman	Rick Jacobson	
1995	Guns & Lipstick	Dancer	Jenõ Hódi	
1995	I Like to Play Games	Suzanne	Moctezuma Lobato	
1995	Alien Terminator	Rachel	Dave Payne	Credited as Cassandra Leigh
1995	Showgirls	Sonny	Paul Verhoeven	
1995	Caged Heat 3000	Kira	Aaron Osborne	Credited as Cassandra Leigh
1996	Criminal Hearts	Claire	Dave Payne	Direct-to-video release
1996	When the Bullet Hits the Bone	Desert Girl	Damian Lee	Uncredited
1996	The Nutty Professor	Sexy Girl	Tom Shadyac	
1996	Dream Master: The Erotic Invader	September	Jackie Garth	Credited as Cassandra Leigh
1997	Lost Highway	Marian	David Lynch	
1997	Intimate Deception	Tina	George Saunders	Direct-to-video release
1997	Face/Off	Cindee	John Woo	
1997	Leaving Scars	Diane Carlson	Brad Jacques	
1997	Time Hunters	Una	Christian Viel	
1997	The Night That Never Happened	Roxy	James Wvinner	
1998	Some Nudity Required	Herself	Johanna Demetrakas and Odette Springer	Documentary
1998	Sheer Passion	Terri	John Quinn	
1998	The Dark Side of Hollywood	Herself	Odette Springer	Documentary
1999	Let the Devil Wear Black	"Bobo"	Stacy Title	
1999	The Last Marshal	Sunny	Mike Kirton	
2001	Pray for Power	Heather Leighton	Brad Jacques	Direct-to-video release
2010	Tribal Beyond the Four: 20 Years of Music, Art and Brotherhood	Herself	Jon Krashna and Bobby Ruiz	Documentary
2016	Smoke Gets in Your Eyes	Frugal Lady	Charlene Bagcal	Short film

=== Television ===
Year(s)	Title	Role(s)	Notes
1992–1994	Red Shoe Diaries	Dancer	S1E12 "Double or Nothing"; S3E8 "Emily's Dance"
1993	Basic Values: Sex, Shock & Censorship in the 90's	Psychiatrist's Receptionist	TV movie
1993–1996	Married... with Children	"Bubbles Double Dee"; Fawn	5 episodes
1994	Dream On	Lisa	S5E13 "The Courtship of Martin's Father"
1994	Love Street	Elizabeth	S1E8 "The Mechanics of Desire". Credited as Cassandra Leigh
1994–1999	Baywatch	Girl #1; Debra Sinclair; Lisa	3 episodes
1995	High Tide	Unknown Role	S2E9 "Natural Born Surfers"
1995–1996	Silk Stalkings	Shannon Everett; Mandy Harrison	S5E8 "Partners: Part 1"; S6E3 "Divorce, Palm Beach Style"
1996	Baywatch Nights	Saundra	S1E21 "A Closer Look"
1996	Daytona Beach	Nikki Sanders	TV movie
1996	Erotic Confessions	Ursula	S3E21 "Caught Bi Surprise"
1996	Campus Cops	Suzette	S1E2 "3,001"
1996–1997	Night Stand with Dick Dietrick	Libby; Vanessa Hammer	S1E26 "Strippers Are Ruining My Marriage"; S2E42 "The Citadel Show"
1997	Total Security	Brittany	S1E8 "Das Bootie"
1998	Brooklyn South	1st Female	S1E12 "Exposing Johnson"
1998	Buddy Faro	Unknown Role	S1E1 "Pilot"
1998	Playboy's Hard Drive	Herself	
1999	The Hughleys	Cinnamon	S1E13 "Reliving Single"
1999	G vs E	Gigi Peaks	S1E2 "Men Are from Mars, Women Are Evil"
1999	The Phantom Eye	Bride #1	Miniseries
1999	Shasta McNasty	Waitress	S1E7 "Viva Las Vegas"
2000	Love Goddesses of Hollywood	Herself	
2001	Black Scorpion	Minerva	3 episodes
2008	SexTV	Herself	S10E14 "A Heart Entrapped/Lisa Boyle/Sandra Turnbull"
