= Friend of the Family =

- Home video cover art
- Directed by: Edward Holzman
- Screenplay by: Edward Holzman; April Moskowitz
- Produced by: Andrew W. Garroni
- Starring: Shauna O'Brien; Griffin Drew; Burke Morgan; Lisa Boyle
- Cinematography: Kim Haun
- Edited by: Sean Valla
- Music by: Richard Bronskill
- Release date: 1995
- Running time: 103 minutes
- Country: United States
- Language: English

Friend of the Family, also known as Elke's Erotic Nights or simply Elke, is a 1995 American erotic drama film written and directed by Edward Holzman, and starring Shauna O'Brien & Griffin Drew.

== Plot ==
A married couple, Linda and Jeff, are trying to get their relationship under control. They do not communicate with each other much; Jeff is a workaholic and Linda thinks he is cheating on her. Linda and Jeff are both having trouble talking to Jeff's two college-aged children, Montana and Josh, from his first marriage. They then meet Elke, the younger sister of one of Linda's old friends. Elke, who is free-spirited and sexually uninhibited, begins interacting with most of the members of the family, emotionally and romantically, with a new openness and communication between them as the unexpected result.

== Cast ==
- Shauna O'Brien as Elke Taylor
- Griffin Drew (credited as Annelyn Griffin Drew) as Linda Williams Stillman
- Burke Morgan (credited as C.T. Miller) as Jeff Stillman
- Lisa Boyle (credited as Lissa Boyle) as Montana Stillman
- Will Potter as Josh Stillman
- Raelyn Saalman as Laura Kellogg
- Alex Demir as Ron Kellogg
- Betsy Monroe as Nancy Kellogg

== Reception ==
Friend of the Family currently has no approval rating on Rotten Tomatoes, but the Want-To-See is currently 62%. TV Guide gave the movie one out of five stars.

== Sequel ==
Friend of the Family II
- Directed by: Fred Olen Ray
- Release date: 1996
- Country: USA
- Language: English

In 1996, an unrelated movie called Passionate Revenge was released with Shauna O'Brien. For marketing purposes it was rebranded a sequel entitled Friend of the Family II directed by Fred Olen Ray (credited as Nicholas Medina). In this movie, Shauna O'Brien plays a femme fatale character named Linda.
