= The Drifting Avenger =

1968 film

- Theatrical release poster
- Directed by: Junya Sato
- Written by: Yoshihiro Ishimatsu
- Produced by: Kōji Shundō; Tsune Yabe
- Starring: Ken Takakura; Ken Goodlet; Judith Roberts; Kevin Cooney; Ronald Norman Lea
- Cinematography: Ichirō Hoshijima
- Edited by: Yoshiki Nagasawa
- Music by: Masao Yagi
- Production company: Toei Studios
- Distributed by: Toei Company
- Release date: 14 June 1968 (Japan)
- Running time: 107 minutes
- Country: Japan
- Language: Japanese
- Budget: 300 million yen

The Drifting Avenger (Japanese: 荒野の渡世人, Hepburn: Koya no toseinin) is a 1968 Japanese Western film shot in Australia, directed by Junya Sato. The film was released on 14 June 1968 by Toei Company.

== Cast ==
- Ken Takakura as Ken Kato
- Ken Goodlet as Marvin
- Judith Roberts as Rosa
- Kevin Cooney as Mike the Boy
- Ronald Norman Lea as Franco (as R. Lea)
- Clive Saxon as Billy
- Pat Twohill as Carson (as John Sherwood)
- Reginald Collins as the Doctor
- Ray Lamont as the Sheriff
- Mike Danning as Laker (as Mike Dunning)
- Osman Yusuf as Duncan (as John Yusef)
- Stanley Rogers as Rogers (as Stan Rogers)
- Tony Allen as Jack (as Tony Allan)
- Chuck Kehoe as Ricky
- Terry Farnsworth as Cowboy Gunslinger (as T. Fansworth)
- Reg Gorman as Otto
- Carlo Manchini as Wayne
- Hans Horneff as Manager (as Hans Horner)
- Graham Keating as Wess
- Peter Armstrong as a Cowboy
- Dew Purington (as D. Purington)
- John Hopkins as Cowboy A (as J. Hopkins)
- Liam Reynolds as Cowboy B (as L. Reynolds)
- B. Evis as Cowboy C
- Allen Bickford (as A. Bickford)
- P. McCornill
- Takashi Shimura as Ken's Father (as T. Shimura)

== Production ==
The film was shot at Goonoo Goonoo Station near Tamworth, with location scenes shot in the village of Nundle, & interior scenes shot at Toei Studios in Tokyo.
