= The Tourist (1987 film) =

- Written by: Terry Bourke; Sue Salem
- Story by: Sue Sale
- Directed by: Terry Bourke
- Starring: Tony Bonner; Michael Pate; Chard Hayward; Zoe Carides
- Music by: Garry Hardman
- Country of origin: Australia
- Original language: English

Production
- Producer: Sue Salem
- Cinematography: Ray Henman
- Running time: 100 minutes
- Production company: SBS Bourke Productions

Original release
- Release: 10 October 1988

The Tourist is an Australian made-for-TV romantic drama film directed by Terry Bourke and starring Tony Bonner, Michael Pate, Chard Hayward, and Zoe Carides.

It was also known as Sands of the Bedouin.

== Premise ==
The film tells the story of an Australian tour guide in Jordan whose two charges are murdered.

== Cast ==
- Tony Bonner as John Ramsden
- Michael Pate as Chief Ibrahaim
- Dagmar Bláhová as Laila Ibrahaim
- Chard Hayward as Abu Gassam
- Harry Michaels as Anwan
