= Sword of Honour (miniseries) =

- Genre: mini-series
- Directed by: Pino Amenta; Catherine Millar
- Starring: Andrew Clarke; Tracy Mann; Alan Fletcher
- Country of origin: Australia
- Original language: English
- No. of episodes: 4

Production
- Running time: 4 x 2 hours
- Production companies: Simpson Le Mesurier Films; Veneficus Films

Original release
- Network: Seven Network
- Release: 20 October 1986 – 1986

Sword of Honour is an Australian miniseries made in 1986 and aired on Channel Seven. Four 100-minute episodes were made. The series starred Andrew Clarke, Tracy Mann and Alan Fletcher.

The series was about two young men who are trying to get over the horrors of the Vietnam War. Andrew Clarke won best actor in a miniseries, and Tracy Mann won best actress in a miniseries in the Logies.

It had a budget of A$5 million. Principal photography was completed on 18 October 1985 with second unit shot after that in Port Macquarie and Thailand.

== Cast ==
- Andrew Clarke as Tony Lawrence
- Tracy Mann as Esse Rogers
- Alan Fletcher as Frank Vittorio
- Nikki Coghill as Vivienne
- Andrew Sharp as Joe Hale
- Pauline Chan as Tam
- Linda Newton as Marg
- Wynn Roberts as Arthur Lawrence
- Julia Blake as Jean Rogers
- Alan Hopgood as Stuart Rogers
- Vince Martin as Phillip
- Gus Mercurio as Onassis
- Tony Rickards as China

== Awards and nominations ==
Year	Association	Category	Recipient/nominee	Result	Ref.
1987	AFI Awards	Best Performance by an Actress in a Mini Series	Tracy Mann	Nominated	
1987	Logie Awards	Most Popular Single Drama or Mini-series	Sword of Honour	Won	
1987	Logie Awards	Most Popular Actor in a Single Drama or Mini-series	Andrew Clarke	Won	
1987	Logie Awards	Most Popular Actress in a Single Drama or Mini-series	Tracy Mann	Won	
1987	Logie Awards	Most Popular Australian Actor	Andrew Clarke	Nominated	
1987	Logie Awards	Most Popular Australian Actress	Tracy Mann	Nominated	

== Home media ==
Sword of Honour was released on DVD and Online by Umbrella Entertainment in March 2012. The DVD is compatible with region 4.

Format	Title	Ep #	Discs	Region 4 (Australia)	Bonus Features
DVD	Sword of Honour	4	3	March 2012	N/A
Online	Sword of Honour	4		2 August 2017	None
