= Sampan (film) =

1968 Hong Kong film by Terry Bourke

- Directed by: Terry Bourke
- Written by: Terry Bourke
- Produced by: Gordon Mailloux
- Release date: 23 September 1968
- Country: Hong Kong
- Language: English
- Budget: $50,000 or Australian $54,000
- Box office: $150,000

Sampan, also known as San-Ban, is a 1968 Hong Kong film which was the first feature directed, written and co-produced by Terry Bourke. The film was successful at the box office.

Bourke called it eighty percent an artistic success.

== Plot ==
In Hong Kong, the owner of a sampan has two sons, one good and one bad. One son falls in love with his stepmother.

== Production ==
The script was written by Bourke, who was working as a journalist in Hong Kong. He met Gordon Mailloux who agreed to produce.

== Release ==
According to Mailoux, the film was the most successful movie made in Hong Kong that year. Bourke claimed the movie contained the first naked scene in Chinese cinema. It was banned in Taiwan.
