= The Faceless Man (film) =

- Film poster
- Directed by: James Di Martino
- Written by: James Di Martino
- Produced by: Lucinda Bruce; James Di Martino; Daniel Facciolo; Rhys Sherring
- Starring: Sophie Thurling; Lucas Pittaway; Andy McPhee; Roger Ward
- Cinematography: Rhys Sherring
- Edited by: Rhys Sherring
- Music by: Bart Walus
- Production company: Chapter 5 Studios
- Release date: 12 October 2019
- Running time: 106 minutes
- Country: Australia
- Language: English

The Faceless Man is a 2019 Australian horror film written and directed by James Di Martino and starring Sophie Thurling, Lucas Pittaway, Andy McPhee and Roger Ward. The film premiered at the 2019 Melbourne Underground Film Festival.

The Faceless Man marks Di Martino's first time directing a feature length film.

== Plot ==
After recovering from cancer for three years, Emily plans a weekend away with her friends to cope with the fear of getting sick again. What starts off as a fun time in a country holiday house turns into a nightmare getaway when Emily and her friends are under attack by rednecks, as well as a supernatural creature: a man without a face that haunts the very house the friends are staying at.

== Cast ==
- Sophie Thurling as Emily Beckman
- Lucas Pittaway as Kyle Jefferies
- Andy McPhee as Eddie Silverbeard
- Roger Ward as King Dougie
- Albert Goikhman as Viktor Nov
- Brendan Bacon as Harrison Beckman
- Daniel Reader as Barry the C***
- Lorin Kauffeld as Nina Hancock
- Martin Astifo as Dave Eddison
- Daniel Facciolo as Brad Barns

== Production ==
Di Martino chose to create The Faceless Man after directing his short film "Five O'Clock", as he wanted to create a feature length movie. He initially debated whether to make a monster or a gangster film before choosing to work the two ideas into a single film. Di Martino cites Get Out as one of his inspirations for the film, describing Jordan Peele's film as an elevated horror film. Of The Faceless Man, Di Martino stated that he wanted it to be "a unique experience. One that goes through different genres and at its core. A deconstruction of the slasher films and creature features. I wanted the experience to weave in black comedy to create a very offbeat adventure. At the same time have a looming presence of evil." The character of Eddie was written specifically for actor Andy McPhee and Di Martino felt that he didn't know "who I could have gotten if he said no."

The origin of the Faceless Man was originally intended to be included in the movie but was dropped after Di Martino watched Hereditary, as he thought that "the cult explanation was so badly executed I didn’t want to try and explain the origins in my film in a way like that."

== Release ==
The Faceless Man premiered at the 2019 Melbourne Underground Film Festival, where it won six awards that included Best Director and Best Film. The film had a VOD release on 28 August 2020 through Freedom Cinema.

== Reception ==
Filmmaker Brian Trenchard-Smith called the film "the new face of Ozploitation". Bobby LePire of Film Threat gave a positive review, calling the film "sublimely perfect in every way you can imagine."
