= Inn of the Damned =

1975 Australian film by Terry Bourke

- Theatrical release poster
- Directed by: Terry Bourke
- Written by: Terry Bourke
- Produced by: Terry Bourke; Rod Hay
- Starring: Judith Anderson; Alex Cord; Michael Craig; Joseph Fürst; Tony Bonner
- Cinematography: Brian Probyn
- Edited by: Rod Hay
- Music by: Bob Young
- Production company: Terryrod Productions
- Distributed by: Roadshow Entertainment
- Release date: 13 November 1975 (Australia)
- Running time: 118 minutes
- Country: Australia
- Language: English
- Budget: AU$417,000 or $427,000
- Box office: AU$178,000 (Australia)

Inn of the Damned is a 1975 Australian horror Western film, directed by Terry Bourke. It has been called Australia's first "horror Western".

== Plot ==
In 1896, a crazed woman and her husband run an inn in eastern Victoria and take revenge for the deaths of their children years before. Cal Kincaid, an American bounty hunter, arrives to investigate recent murders and puts an end to the killing.

== Cast ==
- Judith Anderson as Caroline Straulle
- Alex Cord as Cal Kincaid
- Michael Craig as Paul Melford
- Robert Quilter as Biscayne
- Joseph Fürst as Lazar Straulle
- Tony Bonner as Trooper Moore
- John Meillon as George Parr
- Reg Gorman as Coach Driver
- Lionel Long as Search Horseman

== Production ==
Like Bourke's previous feature, Night of Fear, the film was originally a one-hour script intended for a projected TV series, Fright.

The Australian Film Development Corporation invested $280,000 in the film.

It was filmed in the Mangrove Mountain region of the NSW Central Coast and at Artransa Studios in Sydney. Filming began in November 1973 and took nine weeks but the film was not released until late in 1975. Shooting was marred by disputes between the producers and its principal investor, Australian Film Development Corporation. At the time it was the most expensive local film made in Australia.

== Release ==
=== Critical reception ===
AllMovie called it "more odd than good", and "best viewed as a curiosity." DVD Verdict wrote, "as curiosities go, this Australian horror western (?) from the early '70s definitely deserves some attention."

=== Home video ===
The film was released on DVD alongside 1972 Australian horror film Night of Fear (also directed by Bourke) by Umbrella Entertainment on 16 March 2005. This combo was re-released for Blu-ray on 9 November 2022 as volume 20 of Umbrella's Ozploitation collection.
