= Alien Terminator (1995 film) =

- Directed by: Dave Payne
- Written by: Dave Payne
- Starring: Lisa Boyle (Cassandra Leigh); Maria Ford; Rodger Halston
- Music by: Nigel Holton; Christopher Lennertz
- Production company: Calibre Films
- Release date: 1995
- Running time: 95 minutes
- Country: United States
- Language: English

Alien Terminator is a 1995 American horror film, written and directed by Dave Payne. It stars Cassandra Leigh and Maria Ford. It was also released on video as Alien Species.

== Plot ==
Under the project called Bio-com, the Earthtek Corporation has locked 6 scientists in a deep underground vault to study the effects of isolation. The experiment has been ongoing for almost two years.

Unknown to everyone except one of the scientists, the fake isolation experiment hides Earthtek's real purpose: to use drug(s) to create super-soldiers.

A creature escapes the lab and kills a mouse and the base's cat. The creature can take over the body of whatever it inhabits.

== Cast ==
- Lisa Boyle (credited as Cassandra Leigh) as Rachel
- Maria Ford (credited as Marie Ford) as McKay
- Rodger Halston as Dean Taylor
- Emile Levisetti as Pete
- Kevin Alber as Dr. Newton Fuller
- Bob McFarland as Coach
- Betsy Baldwin as Kelly Hill, a reporter
