= Margaret Laurence (actress) =

Australian actress (born 1950)

- Born: 1951 (age 74–75)
- Occupation: Actress
- Known for: Prisoner, Number 96

Margaret Laurence is an Australian actress, best known for several soap opera roles. She is likely best known internationally for her role as Marilyn Mason in cult series Prisoner, appearing for a brief stint, she plays a prostitute who has a romance with prison electrician Eddie Cook (Richard Moir)

== Biography ==
Laurence trained in Britain, and then worked in America on stage and in several daytime soap operas.

When she moved to Australia, her first high-profile role was in Number 96 as Liz Chalmers for six months from late 1975 to early 1976. Sweet Liz became key character Arnold Feather's second wife, but was ultimately revealed as a deceitful schemer who tried to poison Arnold.

She followed this by playing Marilyn Mason in the television series Prisoner. Laurence was one of the programme's original cast in 1979, but appeared in only the first 16 episodes – the original planned duration of the series. After she left the show she returned to America where she did a lot of promotional work for the show. She stated she did not like the role, and being compared to Farrah Fawcett and Bridgette Bardot, although co-star Val Lehman, said the role should not reflect the quality of the series

She also guest starred played in The Young Doctors in 1979 as troublesome nurse Yvonne Davies.

Her ex-husband is American-born actor Brandon Smith, who had short-term roles in both Number 96 and Prisoner; in the case of Prisoner, appearing in some scenes with Laurence. They have a daughter, Camille.

== Filmography ==
FILM

Title	Year	Role	Type
1979	The Franky Doyle Story	Marilyn Mason	TV film
1981	The Love Boat In Australia	Melanie Kalani / Madeline Kalani (flashback)	TV film US / AUSTRALIA
1982	Brothers	Lani Aveson	Feature film NZ

TELEVISION

Title	Year	Role	Type
1975-1976	Number 96	Liz Chalmers Feather / Beckie Wilson	TV series, 52 episodes
1979	Prisoner	Marilyn Mason	TV series, 16 episodes
1979	The Young Doctors	Yvonne Davies	TV series, 2 episodes
1981	The Love Boat	Melanie Kalani / Madeline Kalani (flashback)	TV series US / AUSTRALIA, 2 episodes
