= Plugg (film) =

- Directed by: Terry Bourke
- Written by: Terry Bourke
- Produced by: Ninki Maslansky
- Starring: Peter Thompson; Norman Yemm; Cheryl Rixon
- Cinematography: Brian Probyn
- Edited by: Rod Hay
- Music by: Bob Young
- Production company: Romac Productions
- Release date: 3 October 1975
- Running time: 88 mins
- Country: Australia
- Language: English
- Budget: AU$100,000

Plugg is a 1975 Australian sex comedy about a private investigator.

== Plot ==
Private detective Plugg is hired to watch a suspect escort agency. Inspector Closer comes after Plugg.

== Cast ==
- Peter Thompson as Horatio Plugg
- Norman Yemm as Inspector Closer
- Cheryl Rixon as Kelli Kelly
- Reg Gorman as Constable Hector Raymond
- Joseph Fürst as Judge Fraudenheist
- Alan Cassell as Herman Cavanagh

== Production ==
The film was shot in Perth.

== Reception ==
=== Box office ===
The film had a brief run in cinemas. However Tim Burstall in The Bulletin called the film's commercial fate a "total disaster".

=== Critical ===
The Age wrote "laboured 'dirty' jokes, inane pratfalls, mistimed gags... it is all unbelievably juvenile and makes Alvin Purple look like Buster Keaton."

David Stratton called the film "cheap and amateurish".

Brian McFarlane called it "possibly the worst Australian film ever made... astonishingly inept."

== Home media ==
=== DVD & streaming releases ===
Title	Format	Ep #	Discs	Release date	Special features	Distributors
Plugg	DVD	Film	01	2 January 2019	Theatrical Trailer (accessible at the end of the Feature)	Umbrella Entertainment
Plugg	Umbrella Streaming	Film	-	2 January 2019	None	Umbrella Entertainment
