= Spyforce =

Australian TV series

- Genre: Drama; Military; Action; Espionage; Serial
- Created by: Roger Mirams; Ron McLean; Brian Wright
- Starring: Jack Thompson; Peter Sumner; Redmond Phillips; Katy Wild; Stuart Finch; Bill Hunter; Arna-Maria Winchester; Chips Rafferty; Marty Morton
- Country of origin: Australia
- No. of seasons: 2
- No. of episodes: 42

Production
- Executive producer: Bruce Gordon
- Producer: Roger Mirams
- Running time: 60 minutes

Original release
- Network: Nine Network
- Release: 8 August 1971 – 1973

Spyforce is an Australian television series that aired from 1971 to 1973 on Nine Network. The series was based upon the adventures of Australian Military Intelligence operatives in the South West Pacific during World War II. It was produced by Nine Network in conjunction with Paramount Pictures.

The series centres on the action and adventures of lead actor Jack Thompson's character Erskine, and his main support character, Peter Sumner's Gunthar Haber. It was the first lead role for Jack Thompson. The two are part of an elite unit of special operatives, the Special Intelligence Unit, and their adventures are loosely based upon those of the real Services Reconnaissance Department who often operated behind Japanese-held lines during the war.

Unlike most previous war films, Spyforce deliberately steered away from the notion that the United States was solely responsible for Japan's defeat, and highlights the important role Australian forces played in the defeat of the Imperial Japanese Army. Producer Roger Mirams was also careful to avoid stereotypes of the genre, and tired formulas for the battle scenes.

== Synopsis ==
Spyforce was designed by Roger Mirams to be a wartime espionage action adventure in the format of a weekly, hour-long television mini-film. It was very much intended to highlight the important role played by Australian forces in achieving victory in World War II, but also remain exciting and compelling. Despite being based upon a war setting, character development played a key role in Spyforce. The way the main characters interact and change over time was carefully scripted by Mirams.

Unlike many previous war films, particularly American ones, Spyforce does not portray the protagonists as invincible, who always win an easy victory. Indeed, their human failings are made clear, and their plans do not always come to fruition. It does not dwell on torture by Japanese soldiers, or portray Australians as perfect.

The protagonists are members of a secretive special elite unit known as the Special Intelligence Unit, headed by Colonel Cato, who is only responsible directly to the Prime Minister of Australia. Cato's unit is responsible for sabotage and covert operations, often behind enemy lines, against Japanese forces in the South West Pacific during World War II.

Colonel Cato recruits both Erskine and Gunther Haber into the Special Intelligence Unit as civilian operatives due to their intimate knowledge of the South West Pacific and New Guinea. Both are reluctant at first, so Cato fabricates false evidence against them to coerce them into co-operating.

Although some episodes were filmed on location in New Guinea, Thailand, Hong Kong, Macau and also in Changi Prison in Singapore, most of the filming was done in the Australian bushland surrounding Sydney. Several ideal Sydney locations, such as Middle Head Fortifications were also used.

The narration during the opening credit sequence stated:

Early in 1942 the Japanese Army swept through the South Pacific towards the Australian mainland. They overran the Malay Peninsula and reached deep into the jungles of New Guinea. As a result numbers of civilian planters and soldiers were formed into highly trained espionage teams by Allied Headquarters in Australia. These men were directed into sabotage operations deep behind enemy lines throughout the Pacific area. Much of their work must remain top secret. One of these groups may well have been called: Spyforce.

== Characters ==
- Erskine (Jack Thompson) is the hero and main protagonist of Spyforce. Erskine was an Australian planter in New Ireland in the Australian Territory of New Guinea when the Imperial Japanese Army invaded in 1942. Erskine is bitter about the Australian army withdrawing. Erskine is a heavy drinking, swearing, womanising and sometimes cold hearted man who has little time for rank or etiquette. He was forced off his plantation by advancing Japanese troops, and resents the Australian Army for not having properly protected his property. He is initially reluctant to help Spyforce and only does so because Cato promises to help track down the location of a girl Erskine loves, who is in a POW camp. Despite this, Erskine is an excellent soldier, although often prone to disobeying, or bending orders. He is quick to the trigger, and not afraid of tackling the Japanese head on if necessary. He also has a ruthless streak and can be cold and calculating at times. He despises Gunther Haber initially because they love the same girl, and resents being forced to work with him. But as the two men get to know each other, both realise they have a similar dishonest roguish character, and begin to bond.
- Gunther Haber (Peter Sumner) is Erskine's main sidekick. He is a German planter with a plantation on New Britain, and he too was forced to flee the advancing Japanese. Because of his German heritage, he is initially interned in a Prison Camp in Australia, but later is recruited by the Special Intelligence Unit for his linguistic skills and intimate knowledge of New Guinea. Haber is a cultured German, who is the complete foil for Erskine's rough and ready character. They are also love rivals, and initially the bitterness is strong between the two. However, as they begin to succeed together in their missions, a grudging mutual respect develops. At the beginning Erskine calls Haber 'Adolf' as a slight, but after the men begin to bond, he continues to use the nickname in a more friendly affectionate way.
- Colonel Cato (Redmond Phillips) is the Commanding Officer of the Special Intelligence Unit, and is only directly responsible to the Prime Minister of Australia. He is astutely intelligent, a clever strategist, very cunning and calculating, and is willing to do whatever is necessary to achieve his goals. Cato is not beyond bending the rules, and manipulates both Erskine and Haber into co-operating with the Special Intelligence Unit.
- Lieutenant French (Katy Wild) is Colonel Cato's secretary. Despite her cute good looks, she has her finger on the pulse of the operations. Although primarily limited to administrative duties in the Units headquarters office, French does occasionally operate in the field. Unlike Erskine and Haber, French is a member of the Australian Army, and holds the rank of Lieutenant. French has a crush on Erskine, and he an attracted admiration for her, but their relationship always remains platonic.
- Captain Pollock (Bill Hunter) was a primarily support role. He was an Australian Army captain who appeared in the first 11 episodes, primarily when the Special Intelligence Unit had to interact directly with the Australian Army.
- Captain Bergen (Stuart Finch) replaced Captain Pollock as the Australian Army's main officer in later episodes.
- Barrow (Max Cullen) was a psychopathic criminal that Colonel Cato used to use to brutally interrogate prisoners, due to his aggressive personality. Barrow only appears in the first and fourth episodes.
- Jill Stewart (Arna-Maria Winchester) is an ASIO undercover operative who is a master of disguise. She was born in Burma and has contacts throughout the South West Pacific and particularly in New Guinea. Stewart is a master linguist, fluent in five languages, and is also a firearms expert.

== Production ==
Roger Mirams was a newsreel cameraman and war correspondent during World War II. He had long harboured an ambition to make a TV series set during the war. In 1959 he made a pilot called The Coastwatchers but no series resulted.

Mirams went on to establish a strong reputation in the world of children's TV. On one of the shows, Woobinda (Animal Doctor), he established a good working relationship with writer Ron McLean. Mirams showed McLean a concept he had been working on called Sparrowforce and McLean were enthusiastic.

The idea appealed to American producers Paramount Pictures, who backed Mirams to begin production without having seen a script. He made the pilot episode, "Spy Catcher", which was shot in November 1970.

The pilot impressed Paramount, who bought overseas distribution rights, and the Nine Network, who bought the local rights. The series was shot in colour even though Australian TV was broadcast in black and white at the time.

The first episode – retitled "The General" – aired in Sydney on 8 August 1971, and the rest of Australia on 26 August 1971. It was originally intended to produce 26 episodes, but following the success of the first series, Mirams held talks with both Nine Network and Paramount Pictures, who backed him for a second series. In all 42 episodes were produced. The series was last aired on Australian television in Adelaide on 21 September 1976, but has been re-run several times since.

Actor Russell Crowe appeared briefly in one episode as a child actor at the age of seven.

McLean wrote 35 of the episodes. The main directors were Howard Rubie and David Baker.

It has been argued the series "established the Thomson star persona – cocky, smooth, secretly idealistic, prone to explosive bursts of violence and temper."

== Episodes ==
No.	Title	Directed by	Written by	Original release date
1	"The General" "Spy Catcher" (formerly known by this title)	David Baker	Ron McLean	8 August 1971
Shortly after the Japanese submarine attack on Sydney, Colonel Cato, the Commanding Officer of the Special Intelligence Unit, sends Erskine to New Ireland to try and kidnap a German Officer who is working there with their Japanese Allies. It is vital the snatch goes according to plan, as Cato believes that the General is in possession of a list that contains the names of all German agents working in Australia and that the agents are planning a series of raids in Australia like the submarine attack; their aim is to provoke Prime Minister Curtin to withdraw Australian troops from the Middle East and reduce the pressure on Rommell. Erskine is teamed up with a fellow planter, Gunther Haber whom he hates, partly because he's German and partly because they used to love the same woman. On the island Haber seemingly defects to the enemy. In Australia, Cato gets a fellow member of Spyforce, Barrow (Max Cullen), to torture and interrogate a female German agent (Leila Blake).
2	"Death Railway"	Howard Rubie	Ron McLean	TBA
Colonel Cato has received intelligence reports that the Imperial Japanese Army are using allied Prisoners of War as slave labour to build the Burma Railway. Plans are drawn up to prevent the railway from connecting Siam to Burma by blowing up part of the route ahead of the construction. Colonel Cato sends Erskine and Haber to gather information, but ensures they are captured by the Japanese in the hope they will be able to gather blueprints of the railway. Whilst they are Prisoners of War, they are shocked to discover that there is an Australian engineer, John Carpenter (John Meillon), assisting the Japanese with the construction of the railway. Back in Australia, Cato strikes up a relationship with Carpenter's wife (Lorraine Bayly). The episode featured location filming in Thailand and a story inspired by Bridge on the River Kwai.
3	"Portuguese Man of War"	TBA	TBA	TBA
German Gestapo secret agents have been sent to Sydney where they are sabotaging important installations, and Colonel Cato devises a plan to thwart them. Suspicion of compliance once again falls upon German national Gunther Haber who is then interned in a Prisoner of War camp with captured German agents, leaving Erskine to combat the remaining agents alone. He tracks them down to an expatriate Portuguese fishing community, whilst Haber and the interred German agents manage to escape from the camp. Having infiltrated their group, Haber learns of their plans to attempt to blow up the Queen Mary which is carrying thousands of Australian troops back from the Middle East to reinforce New Guinea against the Japanese. With Erskine's help, Haber manages to thwart to sabotage attempt, and save the ship.
4	"The Prisoner"	TBA	TBA	TBA
Colonel Cato creates false evidence linking Gunther Haber and Erskine to a massacre on a small Pacific island in order to demonstrate the lengths he will go to in order to force them to work alongside each other, and to force them to carry out the orders he commands. Having manipulated them into continuing service with his department, he sends the pair to Singapore in order to break into Changi Prison and rescue a renowned British bacteriologist who is being kept prisoner there. Colonel Cato fears that the Japanese will force him to create bacteriological weapons if he is not rescued.
5	"The Bridge"	TBA	TBA	TBA
Gunther Haber and Erskine discover a plot to destroy the Sydney Harbour Bridge as a massive Allied shipping convey passes beneath. The pair, resentful of being forced to work for Colonel Cato's Special Intelligence Unit, try to use the information to bargain their way out of the organisation.
6	"The Trader"	TBA	TBA	TBA
Erskine and Gunther Haber are back in New Guinea where they are called upon to help rescue a party of locals from the advancing Imperial Japanese Army. The Japanese discover their presence and cut them off from their path to the coast. With the Japanese Army closing in, the party take refuge in a small trading post, but the pair soon become suspicious that one of their party is assisting the Japanese in their pursuit. In one scene. Winchester appears naked in a shower, and the scene was originally going to be cut for fear of offending the conservative censors of the period, however after much debate MacLean and Rubie decided the scene was "much too good to be cut".
7	"The Escape"	TBA	TBA	TBA
Erskine and Gunther Haber are back in New Guinea where they are caught by the Japanese trying to blow up a petrol depot. The Australian Prime Minister hears about their capture and instructs Colonel Cato to use whatever means at his disposal to rescue them. A ruthless ex SAS member Major Paul Cooper is sent to New Guinea to assist in their escape.Major Cooper infiltrates the prison using a clever disguise and kills the guards one by one until he gets to the cell. Using all his cunning skills Major Cooper breaks down the door of the cell only to be met by 10 Japanese guards who he kills single-handedly. Erskine and Gunther Haber are rescued and taken by Major Cooper back to Australia. After risking his life Major Cooper is knighted by the Australian Prime Minister for his bravery.
8	"27 Hours"	TBA	TBA	TBA
Erskine and Gunther Haber are sent behind enemy lines to locate an Australian Medic, Corporal Michael Markidis, who is being held captive by the Japanese. After their own medic is killed they force Markidis to attend to their wounded and sick. A chronic case of diarrhoea breaks out amongst the Japanese Soldiers and it is discovered that Markidis has been dispensing laxatives instead of headache pills. Soon deaths occur and further information comes to light that Markidis has also poisoned the water supply. Markidis breaks out of the camp and is hunted by the Japanese. While on the run he meets up with Erskine and Gunther Haber. During the following 27 hours they resist countless attacks from the Japanese before eventually making it back to a waiting submarine that takes them back to Australia.
9	"Massacre on Hill 32"	TBA	TBA	TBA
Sgt Pearl orders the members of C Company to storm and capture Hill 32 which is held by the Japanese. After a bloody battle which sees half the company killed, including Sgt Pearl, victory is secured and Corporal Markidis along with Privates Girdis, Perkins, Storch & Scotts proudly hoist the Australian flag. All is not as it seems when it is discovered that Private Anthony Stoker had deserted in the face of the enemy carrying with him allied codes that are crucial to the allied effort in the Pacific. Knowing that if the codes fell into enemy hands Colonel Cato orders Erskine and his partner Gunther Haber to find Stoker and recover the codes. They find him cowering in a cave trembling with fear and with the Japanese approaching rapidly. Stoker spots them and makes a run to the exit of the cave. Not knowing who he is or what he holds the Japanese shoot Stoker and he is badly wounded. Facing a barrage of fire Erskine and Gunther Haber rescue Stoker and fight off the enemy and escape. They take him back to Sydney where he is Court Martialled. Found guilty of desertion in the face of the enemy Stoker is ordered to face a firing squad. Corporal Markidis intervenes and pleads that Stoker is mentally ill. He spends the rest of his life in a mental institution.
10	"The Cattleman"	TBA	TBA	TBA
Erskine and Gunther Haber are back in New Guinea where they are trapped and unable to elude the advancing Imperial Japanese Army. Meanwhile, Colonel Cato has just received news that the Imperial Japanese Army have landed a small party of soldiers in Darwin and are venturing into the outback. The Prime Minister tells Colonel Cato that there is only two men who can stop the Japanese advancement. A retired WW1 veteran come Cattleman, Joe Tapp and the newly promoted Captain Michael Markidis, are dispatched to destroy the Japanese. Joe, who has a strong bond with the local Aboriginals enlists their support. Markidis, Tapp and the Aboriginals poison the waterholes ahead of the Japanese. After days of no drinkable water or fresh food the Japanese are at the mercy of the harsh conditions and unable to go any further. Markidis and Tapp storm their camp and capture the Imperial Japanese Army. Some try to escape but are speared by the aboriginals as they run. The legend of Joe Tapp quickly gets back to The Japanese High Command and they throw out their planned invasion of the Australian Mainland.
11	"The Countess"	TBA	TBA	TBA
12	"The Cripple"	TBA	TBA	TBA
13	"The Assassin"	TBA	TBA	TBA
14	"The Tunku"	TBA	TBA	TBA
15	"The Gunner"	TBA	TBA	TBA
16	"The Saviour – Part One"	TBA	TBA	TBA
17	"The Saviour – Part Two"	TBA	TBA	TBA
18	"The Samurai"	Howard Rubie, David Baker	Ron McLean	TBA
Erskine and Gunther Haber go to a Japanese-occupied island where the local commander is a Japanese officer convinced he is a reincarnation of an 11th-century Japanese samurai (Kuki Kaa). The officer likes to hunt captured Allied officers in the style of The Most Dangerous Game. While Erskine romances some local ladies, Haber is captured by the officer but manages to defeat him with a bow and arrow.
19	"The Bunker"	TBA	TBA	TBA
20	"Reilley's Army"	David Baker	Peter Schreck	TBA
Erskine and Haber are sent to New Guinea to bring home a coastwatcher, Reilly (Chips Rafferty, in his final role). Reilly has "gone native", with a local wife and children, and refuses to leave. Cato then orders the men to blow up a fuel dump.
21	"The Courier"	Howard Rubie	Ron McLean	TBA
Erskine captures a Japanese courier who has valuable information about Japanese troops at Guadalcanal. He takes the courier back to Darwin, where a Dutch pilot (Jeff Ashby) is to fly him, the officer, and Lt French back to base. However the Dutch pilot turns out to be a German agent who leaves Erskine and Wild in the desert. (Peter Sumner does not appear in the episode).
22	"The Doctor"	Howard Rubie	Ron McLean	TBA
Cato develops a devious plan to combat German agents who have abducted the wife of a doctor in order to force his aid in sabotaging a supply of penicillin for Allied troops which could result in their death.
23	"The Major"	Howard Rubie, David Baker	Ron McLean	TBA
Erskine is parachuted into Burma with a beautiful female operative, Jill Stewart, in order to blow up a bridge. They come across the base of a British long range penetration group, whose officer (Tony Wager) has an affair with Stewart, and whose sergeant (Nick Tate) is homosexually bullying and raping a young fellow soldier (Robert Blackman).A very odd storyline given the era this was filmed in. They succeed in blowing up the bridge.
24	"The Lovers"	TBA	TBA	TBA
25	"The Chase"	TBA	TBA	TBA
26	"The Diplomat"	TBA	TBA	TBA
27	"The District Commissioner"	TBA	TBA	TBA
28	"The Troupers"	TBA	TBA	TBA
29	"The Encounter"	TBA	TBA	TBA
30	"The Breakout"	TBA	TBA	TBA
31	"The Interrogator"	TBA	TBA	TBA
32	"The Raiders"	Terry Bourke	TBA	TBA
33	"The Forger"	TBA	TBA	TBA
34	"The Correspondent"	TBA	TBA	TBA
35	"The Double Agent"	TBA	TBA	TBA
36	"The Misfits"	Terry Bourke	TBA	TBA
37	"The Mission"	TBA	TBA	TBA
38	"The Journey"	TBA	TBA	TBA
39	"The Decoy"	TBA	TBA	TBA
40	"The Murder"	TBA	TBA	TBA
41	"The Trail"	TBA	TBA	TBA
42	"The Rolls That Went To War"	TBA	TBA	TBA

== Broadcast ==
The series continued to air in reruns through 21 September 1976.

== Home media ==
Spyforce was released on DVD by Umbrella Entertainment in April 2013. The DVD set is compatible with all region codes. On 9 November 2022 Umbrella Entertainment included a full episode of Spyforce ("The Raiders") as a bonus feature for the Blu-ray double-feature release of Australian films Night of Fear and Inn of the Dammed, this was in celebration of Terry Bourke who was director of both films and that episode of Spyforce. The episode included an introduction by Jack Thompson recalling Bourke's direction.
