= Night of Fear (film) =

1973 Australian film by Terry Bourke

- Theatrical release poster
- Directed by: Terry Bourke
- Written by: Terry Bourke
- Produced by: Rod Hay
- Starring: Norman Yemm; Carla Hoogeveen
- Cinematography: Peter Hendry
- Edited by: Ray Alchin
- Production company: Terryrod
- Distributed by: Umbrella Entertainment (2005 DVD & 2022 Blu-ray)
- Release date: 18 March 1973
- Running time: 50 minutes
- Country: Australia
- Language: English

Night of Fear is a 1972 Australian horror film, directed by Terry Bourke. It was written by Bourke and produced by Rod Hay. Its theme and style bears a resemblance to the horror classic The Texas Chain Saw Massacre, released two years later. The film is notable for having no dialogue or character names. It has been called "the first Australian horror movie of the renaissance".

== Plot ==
The film opens with a short vignette featuring a woman riding a horse through the countryside. She dismounts and ties the horse to a tree. A bedraggled man appears and unties the horse, startling it to make it run. Not seeing the man, the woman sets after her horse, but encounters the man’s cabin in her pursuit. As she enters, the man attacks her from behind and locks her in a room. The man then goes outside, pulls a secret handle hidden in the power box, then shoots and dismembers the horse.

The opening credits roll previewing some of the more shocking moments from the film to come.

Following a near-miss with a removal van, a woman's car runs off the road through a barrier sign and goes down a hill. Unable to reverse back up the hill and to the highway, she instead drives forward along the dirt backroad. The driver of removal van stops to help, only to see her drive away. He then looks down to see the broken sign marked “dead end no way through”.

The woman drives along the back road for a while before crashing in a large ditch and being knocked unconscious. She regains consciousness to see the bedraggled man walking toward her carrying a white rat on his shoulder. She takes shelter in the car as the deranged man attacks her eventually smashing the windscreen with a shovel. The woman manages to escape, but the man chases her. Losing him in the dense bushland, she returns to the car after dark and sounds the horn for help. Nearby, the man responds to the sound of the horn by musically ringing his shovel against the foliage.

Again, the woman flees and again the man chases her. As she runs in the night, she encounters the impaled head of a horse (presumably, the horse from the opening scene) before arriving at a cabin. She enters and explores the cabin before falling unconscious and into a nightmare in which the man appears before her holding a human skull over his genitals.

She wakens to find the deranged man trying to enter the cabin. As with the beginning of the film, we again witness the man pull a secret handle hidden in the power box, but now we see its effect. A wall panel in the cabin opens and rats pour in to devour her. We see close-up of cats looking on at the gore of the rats feasting while the man sits outside and appears to masturbate.

The film ends with a police search closing in on the cabin. Suspicious, but without proof, the Police question the man as he feeds his chickens. As they leave, we see a cage high in the bamboo containing a cat and a human skull.

== Cast ==
- Norman Yemm as The Man
- Carla Hoogeveen as The Girl
- Mike Dorsey as The Lover
- Briony Behets as Girl Rider
- Peter Armstrong as The Truckie
- James Moss as The Client
- Curt Jansen as Garage Attendant
- Pinkie as the Albino Rat

== Production ==
The film was shot over twelve days in mid 1972. It was originally intended to be a pilot for TV series called Fright. The Australian Broadcasting Commission provided a crew and 35mm production facilities in exchange for television rights.

== Release ==
The film was initially banned in Australia by the OFLC. The makers of Night of Fear appealed to the review board and it was released in November 1972 with an 'R' (18+) rating. It has since been re-classified 'M' (15+).

The film enjoyed a profitable run in independent cinemas and drive ins.

=== Home media ===
The film was released on DVD alongside fellow Australian horror film Inn of the Damned (also directed by Bourke) by Umbrella Entertainment on 16 March 2005. This combo was re-released for Blu-ray on 9 November 2022 as volume 20 of Umbrella's Ozploitation collection.

== Critical reception ==
AllMovie wrote, "Night of Fear is a potent, no-frills little shocker that is likely to delight fans of vintage horror", complimenting its "excellent use of whiplash-speed editing, bizarre camera angles and a densely layered soundtrack to create a consistently unnerving atmosphere."
