= Lady Stay Dead =

- Theatrical film poster
- Directed by: Terry Bourke
- Written by: Terry Bourke
- Produced by: Terry Bourke
- Starring: Chard Hayward; Louise Howitt; Deborah Coulls; Roger Ward
- Cinematography: Ray Henman
- Edited by: Ron Williams
- Music by: Bob Young
- Production company: Ryantare Productions
- Release date: 10 September 1981
- Running time: 92 minutes
- Country: Australia
- Language: English
- Budget: A$610,000

Lady Stay Dead is a 1981 Australian thriller film produced, written and directed by Terry Bourke about a psychotic handyman.

== Plot ==
Gordon Mason works as a handyman at the Rocky Beach Motel. Mason proceeds to spy on Marie Coleby, who is bad tempered, bossy and constantly barks orders at and berates Mason all day. Later that day, when she packs up to drive to the airport to pick up her sister, Jenny, Mason intrudes on her, plays one of her songs on the radio ("Loving from a Distance") and rapes her. After Marie bites Mason and calls him an animal, he drowns Marie in her fish tank in a fit of rage. While trying to hide her body in a garbage bag, her neighbor Billy Sheperd catches him in the act and is also killed by Mason, who also poisons Billy's dog.

Later, Jenny is driven home from the airport and finds the house empty. She later finds Marie's jewels from her necklace in the fish tank and even finds Billy's dog floating in the water at the beach. She tries to tell Billy but sees his body lying on the couch and mistakes him for merely napping. Jenny tries making a few phone calls to find Marie and even tries calling Billy later, but receives no answer. She then meets Mason, whom she draws suspicion towards due to his knowledge of the house, which are later confirmed by sundown when she finds a muddy footprint on the carpet that was attempted to be cleaned off. She runs back to Billy's house to get help from him only to find his body hidden in his garden shed. She runs back to the motel to call the police only to find Mason there waiting for her, dressed in a suit with presents for her.

Mason cuts the phone wire while she calls the coastal guard service. Mason then proceeds to taunt Jenny and whistles "Loving from a Distance" every now and then. He also tries to break into the house to no avail. Two policemen arrive shortly, officer Clyde Collings and patrolman Rex "Pops" Dunbar, but Pops is killed by Mason with a shotgun from the cop car when Pops tries to radio for backup. Collings reveals to Jenny that Mason has a history of raping other women who never laid charges on him because of their "irate husbands". He then tells Jenny to make a run for the highway since Mason won't see her in the dark, but she stops when she finds Marie's body in the backyard and mourns over her. Collings tries to strike a deal with Mason, who refuses, but Collings vows to kill Mason after he sets his partner (who survived the gunshot) on fire. Collings chases Mason and fights him in the swimming pool and eventually drowns Mason.

Jenny, who eventually ran out and hid in the bushes on the highway, comes out of hiding when Collings' car drives by and orders her to come out. It's revealed that Mason survived his drowning and killed Collings. He proceeds to strangle her, but envisions Marie in her place and has a mental breakdown. Mason is then hit by a passing motorcyclist and is thrown into Collings' car. Another cop car drives by and the two officers inside find Jenny lying on the road. One of them inspects Collings' car and finds a barely conscious Mason inside about to shoot him with the shotgun, but that officer shoots and kills Mason.

== Cast ==
- Chard Hayward as Gordon Mason
- Louise Howitt as Jenny Nolan
- Deborah Coulls as Marie Coleby
- Roger Ward as Officer Clyde Collings
- James Elliott as Patrolman Rex 'Pops' Dunbar
- Les Foxcroft as Billy Shepherd

== Production ==
The film was shot in Palm Beach, Sydney.

== Reception ==
According to Bourke, the film sold to 40 markets in 21 countries.

== Accolades ==
Terry Bourke won a Fantafestival Award for Best Thriller for his work on Lady Stay Dead.

== See also ==
- List of films featuring home invasions
- The Plumber, a similarly-themed Australian film released around the same time
