= Season of Australian Plays =

Season of Australian Plays was an anthology series of 6 television movies screened by the ABC in 1979. Written by six different writers they covered different genres and looked at different areas of life and characteristics in 1970s Australia. They began on 14 October with Burn the Butterflies and played over six consecutive Sunday nights concluding with Banana Bender on 18 November.

== Films ==
- October 14
- Burn the Butterflies
- Writer
  - Cliff Green
- Director
  - Oscar Whitbread
- Cast
  - Ray Barrett as Prime Minister Joe Delaney
  - Fred Parslow as Deputy Prime Minister
  - Monica Maughan as Senator Brairley Anderson
  - Gerald Maguire as PM's private secretary
  - George Mallaby as Minister for Overseas Trade
  - John Bowman as probing television reporter

- October 21
- Mismatch
- Writer
  - Barry Donnelly
- Director
  - Ken Hannam
- Cast
  - Stephen O'Rourke as Richard Harrington
  - Jane Harders as Marsha Harrington

- October 28
- Gail
- Writer
  - Keith Thompson
- Director
  - John Gauci
- Cast
  - Sally Cooper as Gail Edwards
  - Terry Gill as Dad
  - Nanette Wallace as Mum

- November 4
- Money in the Bank
- Writer
  - Peter Yeldham
- Director
  - John Walker
- Cast
  - Max Meldrum as George
  - Tom Richards as Charlie
  - Barbara Stephens as Maggie

- November 11
- The Rock Pool
- Writer
  - Colin Free
- Director
  - Chris Thomson
- Cast
  - Bunney Brooke as Toddy
  - Ed Devereaux as Ernie
  - Lyn James as Myra

- November 18
- Banana Bender
- Writer
  - John May
- Director
  - John Walker
- Cast
  - John Hargreaves as Tom Harvey
  - Lyndell Rowe as Maureen
  - Maurie Fields as Smiley

== Accolades ==
1980 Sammy Awards

- Best TV play - Burn the Butterflies
- Best writer TV play - Keith Thompson (Gail)

1980 Logie Awards

- Best actress in a single drama - Bunney Brooke (The Rock Pool)
- Best single drama - Burn the Butterflies
