= Bit Part =

- Written by: Colin Free
- Directed by: Eric Tayler
- Starring: John Meillon; Vincent Ball; Noni Hazlehurst; Judy Nunn; Max Cullen; Stuart Wagstaff
- Country of origin: Australia
- Original language: English

Production
- Producer: Eric Tayler
- Running time: 75 mins

Original release
- Network: ABC
- Release: 1978

Bit Part is a 1978 Australian TV film directed by Eric Taylor and starring John Meillon, Vincent Ball, Noni Hazlehurst, Judy Nunn, Max Cullen, and Stuart Wagstaff. The plot is about a struggling actor who is cast alongside Britain's most famous actor.

== Cast ==
- John Meillon as Tommy
- Vincent Ball as Sherry
- Noni Hazlehurst as Zelda
- Judy Nunn as Jo
- Max Cullen
- Stuart Wagstaff as Bernard
- Wendy Playfair as Emma
