= Nice 'n Juicy =

- Genre: Sitcom
- Created by: Colin Free
- Directed by: Eric Tayler
- Starring: Willie Fennell; John Ewart
- Country of origin: Australia
- Original language: English
- No. of seasons: 1
- No. of episodes: 13

Production
- Executive producer: Eric Tayler
- Running time: 30 minutes

Original release
- Network: ABC
- Release: 6 October 1966 – 1967

Nice 'n Juicy is an Australian television sitcom which first screened on the ABC in 1966. The series was created by Colin Free, based on his play How Do You Spell Matrimony?. The series was set on a run down orchard at Wyvern Creek

Initially, only six episodes were produced, but a further seven episodes were commissioned for a total of 13.

== Cast ==
- Willie Fennell as Jack Hamlin
- John Ewart as Mort Hamlin
- Carmen Duncan as Rosie Withers (2 episodes)
- Gwen Plumb as Ada Withers (2 episodes)
- Ruth Cracknell (1 episode)
- Don Crosby as Mr Mollis (1 episode)

== Reception ==
On viewing advance copies of the first six episodes, Harry Robinson of The Sydney Morning Herald called it a "cleanly made, attractive show" that's "worth a handful of courage" to produce more. Robinson later called the first episode "as refreshing as a walk around an orchard on a spring morning". The same masthead called the first episode "highly promising" and "well worth watching".

== See also ==
- List of Australian television series
