= Burn the Butterflies =

- Genre: Drama
- Written by: Cliff Green
- Directed by: Oscar Whitbread
- Starring: Ray Barrett; Fred Parslow
- Country of origin: Australia
- Original language: English

Production
- Producer: Oscar Whitbread
- Cinematography: Ian Warburton
- Running time: 77 min
- Production company: ABC

Original release
- Release: October 14, 1979

Burn the Butterflies is an Australian 1979 TV movie about a government dealing with the controversy around uranium mining. It was the first film in the ABC's Season of Australian Plays. It stars Ray Barrett as the Prime Minister of Australia.

There was some criticism in the press, but it won a Logie in 1980 for best single drama.

It was written by Cliff Green. who described it as an "experiment".

Cheeky me wanting to push the boundaries and do a drama within another drama, which moved in real time and was relatively cheap to make... There was a crisis in Government and there were news teams filming what was happening. And that was the documentary that was a fake documentary. And all the action, all the on-stage action (if that is the right word) was happening in the Prime Minister's suite in Canberra—so the way he was reacting, and who he was talking to—it was almost a one-man show. And it was beautifully performed. By Ray Barrett. It was wonderful.

Green says the idea to make the film came out of a week he had spent in Canberra for the Australian Writers Guild lobbying for the arts budget.

We brought up the highflyers from Australian Opera, and the ballet, and the Sydney Theatre Company—but we did the hard work. We knocked on the doors and we faced the politicians. And I understood, at the end of that, how that place worked. And it was nothing like how we thought it worked. And if I had decided that I would like to do a Canberra-based piece and set myself, and got up and become a member of the press corps for a few weeks I wouldn’t have got it. It was being in there, and understanding the contradictions, and the layers of commitment and attitude, and so on, that brought it on, that gave me the confidence to write it.

== Cast ==
- Ray Barrett as Prime Minister Joe Delaney
- Fred Parslow as Deputy Prime Minister
- Monica Maughan as Senator Brairley Anderson
- Gerard Maguire as PM's private secretary
- George Mallaby as Minister for Overseas Trade
- John Bowman as probing television reporter

== Awards ==
Year	Award	Category	Result
1980	Sammy Awards	Best TV Play	Won
1980	Logie Awards	Best Single Drama	Won
