= Mismatch =

Mismatch may refer to:

- Mismatching, a supposed negative effect of affirmative action
- Mismatch (2019 film), a Telugu-language romantic sports film
- Mismatch (1979 film), an Australian television film
- Mismatch, a song by Lil Gotit, from the album Hood Baby
- Mismatch, a song by Nav, with Babyface Ray, from the album Demons Protected by Angels

== See also ==
- Mismatched, an Indian Hindi-language television series
- Miss Match, an American comedy-drama television series
- Miss Match (film), a 2014 film
