= John Meillon =

Australian actor (1934–1989)

John Meillon OBE
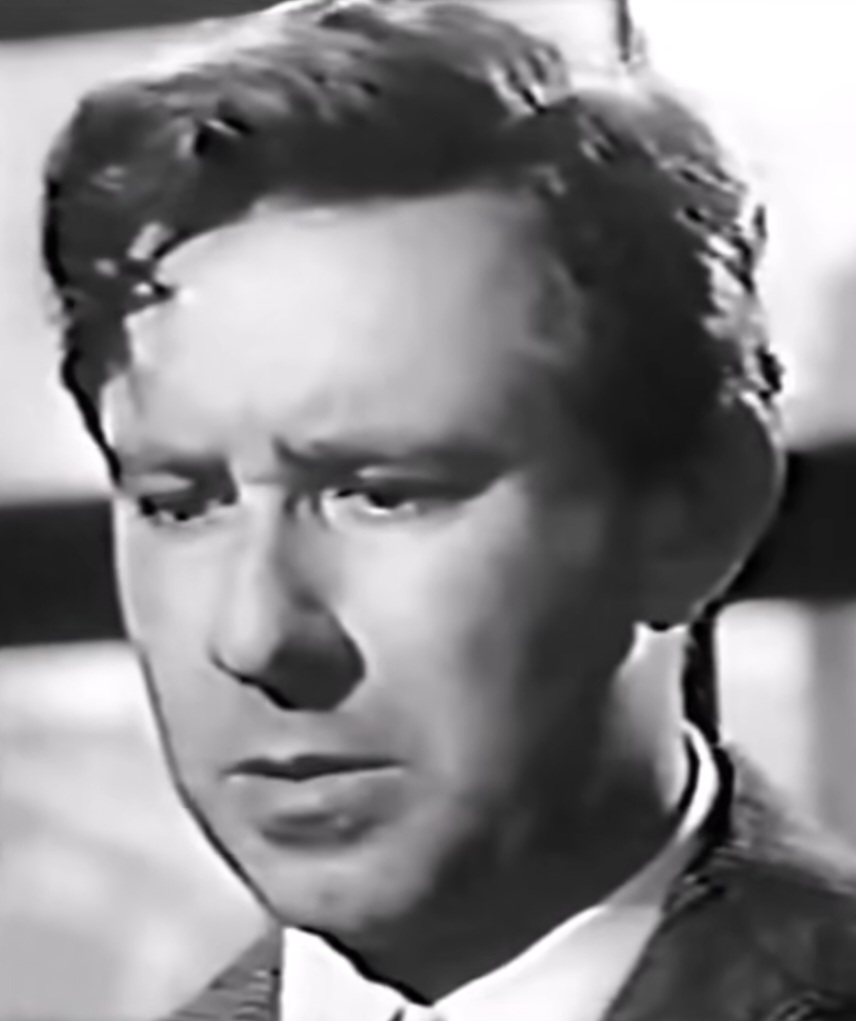
- Meillon in an episode of One Step Beyond (1961)
- Born: 1 May 1934; Mosman, New South Wales, Australia
- Died: 11 August 1989 (aged 55); Neutral Bay, New South Wales, Australia
- Occupation: Actor
- Years active: 1945–1988
- Spouses: June Salter (m. 1958; div. 1971) Bunny Gibson (m. 1972)
- Children: 2

John Meillon (/ˈmɛljən/ MEL-yon; 1 May 1934 – 11 August 1989) was an Australian character actor known for dramatic as well as comedy roles. He portrayed Walter Reilly in the films Crocodile Dundee and Crocodile Dundee II. He also voiced advertisements for Victoria Bitter beer. He appeared in several Australian New Wave films including Wake in Fright and The Cars That Ate Paris.

== Early life ==
Meillon was born in Mosman, a suburb of Sydney, New South Wales, the eldest child of three children to Theodor Boesan Meillon, a clerk, and Florence Beatrice 'Jill', née Callaghan. He had an elder sister, Laurel, a younger sister, Lynne, and his younger brother was director Bob Meillon (1943–2012).

Meillon attended Mosman Church of England Preparatory and Sydney Grammar schools. As a child he performed at the Mosman Children's Theatre Club, of which his parents were founding members.

At the age of 15, in 1949, Meillon won the N.S.W. Junior Diving Championship.

== Career ==
=== Radio and theatre ===
In 1945 Meillon made his radio debut in the ABC's Bush Christmas, at the age of eleven. He played the title role in the ABC's 1947 radio serial of Ruth Park’s Stumpy.

He played an Aboriginal boy in The Search for the Golden Boomerang on 2UW. Other ABC children’s serial credits included The Gangos, Land of the Rainbow and Budge's Gang. Other roles included Young David in David Copperfield on 2CH and Jim Hawkins in Treasure Island. Further radio plays and series included The Cadbury Show, Rebecca, On the Waterfront and Blue Hills.

Meillon made his stage debut in 1946 as Master Wakefield in Whiteoaks at Sydney's Independent Theatre. His first professional performance was in 1948, with the lead role of Ronnie Winslow in The Winslow Boy at the Minerva Theatre. From 1951 at the age of 17, until 1952, he joined the John Alden Shakespeare Company, performing in productions such as King Lear, A Midsummer Night's Dream and The Merchant of Venice. At the same age, he joined one of Australia's largest advertising agencies as assistant director of radio.

He appeared in Death of a Salesman and Winter Journey, before touring Australia and New Zealand in a 1956 J. C. Williamson's production of The Reluctant Debutante. In 1958 he appeared opposite his then wife, June Salter in Phillip Street Theatre’s Cross Section.

Meillon returned to Australia from the UK in 1964 to appear on stage in Rattle of a Simple Man opposite Salter. Meillon claimed that he learned discipline while working in theatre, and that television was not a good medium for training.

Meillon was appointed an OBE in the 1979 Queen's Birthday Honours, for service to theatre.

=== Film and television ===
In 1961, Meillon had an early recurring role in the British television series A Chance of Thunder as Martin for 6 episodes.

Meillon had a lead role in the television sitcom My Name's McGooley, What's Yours? as Wally Stiller from 1966 to 1968. In 1968 he co-starred in the spin off, Rita and Wally. In 1968 and 1969, he was featured in two episodes of Skippy as Nimble Norris.

In 1971, he had a recurring role in Bellbird for 16 episodes. In 1972, he played Ray Dunlop in Lane End for 7 episodes, and from 1972 to 1973 he had a regular part as Cyril Kirby in Over There. He played the role of James Casey in the 1984 miniseries version of The Fourth Wish. In 1980, he appeared as Premier Dakin in Timelapse.

In 1984 he appeared in the miniseries The Dismissal, for which he won a Logie Award.

He made guest appearances on numerous series including Riptide, The Rovers, The Link Men, Delta, Division 4, Matlock Police, Dynasty, Spyforce, Homicide, Luke's Kingdom, Scales of Justice, A Country Practice (on which his brother Bob Meillon was director) and The Dunera Boys. He also appeared in a number of early Australian TV plays.

Meillon's first film role was a small appearance in On the Beach (1959). Like many actors of his generation, Meillon also worked in the UK, his 1960 role in his second film The Sundowners having taken him to London. While there, he consciously steered away from Australian roles. His career flourished abroad, but he returned to Australia in 1964.

Meillon starred in several Australian New Wave and Ozploitation films, including They're a Weird Mob (1966), Wake in Fright, Walkabout (both 1971), The Cars That Ate Paris (1974), Sidecar Racers, Inn of the Damned and Ride a Wild Pony (all 1975). He played the role of Casey in the 1976 film The Fourth Wish, winning the AACTA Award for Best Actor in a Leading Role that same year.

Further film roles included The Picture Show Man (1977) for which he was nominated for an Australian Film Institute (AFI) Award, Heatwave (1982), The Wild Duck (1983), earning him a further AFI Award nomination, Frenchman's Farm (1987) and The Everlasting Secret Family (1988), receiving yet another AFI Award nomination for the latter. Meillon is perhaps best known however, for his role as Walter Reilly in the 1986 internationally successful film Crocodile Dundee (alongside Paul Hogan) and its sequel Crocodile Dundee II in 1988.

=== Voiceover ===
With his rich baritone, Meillon was used extensively in voice-over work – most famously in his work as the Victoria Bitter narrator who says "you can get it any old how". The VB campaign ran for two decades until Meillon’s death in 1989. With the approval of the Meillon family, Carlton & United Breweries (CUB) has continued to use his voice through digital remastering and by recutting the original recordings. He also voiced television commercials for Berger Paints NSW.

=== Music ===
In 1977, Meillon released the single "Tap Tap"/"Picture Show Man", which peaked at number 80 on the Australian singles chart.

== Personal life ==
Meillon married Australian actress June Salter in 1958 and they had one son, John Meillon, Jr., also an actor. Meillon and Salter were divorced in 1971, but remained friends. Meillon married English-born actress Rita 'Bunny' Gibson on 5 April 1972 at Crows Nest Methodist Church. They also had a son.

In June 1980, Meillon's favourite pub, The Oaks at Neutral Bay, opened The John Meillon OBE Bar in his honour. He continued to frequent the bar over the following decade, including visiting in the week before his death.

== Death ==
Meillon died from cirrhosis at his home in Neutral Bay, Sydney, on 11 August 1989. Meillon was posthumously awarded the Raymond Longford Lifetime Achievement Award.

== Filmography ==
=== Film ===
Year	Production	Role	Type
1959	On the Beach	Ralph Swain	Feature film
1960	The Sundowners	Bluey Brown	Feature film
1961	The Long and the Short and the Tall	Private 'Smudge'Smith	Feature film
1961	Watch It, Sailor!	Albert Tufnell	Feature film
1961	Offbeat	Johnny Remick	Feature film
1962	The Valiant	Bedford	Feature film
1962	Operation Snatch	Medical Officer	Feature film
1962	Billy Budd	Neil Kincaid	Feature film
1962	The Longest Day	Rear Admiral Alan G. Kirk (uncredited)	Feature film
1962	Death Trap	Ross Williams	Feature film
1963	Cairo	Willy	Feature film
1963	The Running Man	Jim Jerome	Feature film
1964	633 Squadron	Flight Lieutenant Gillibrand	Feature film
1964	Guns at Batasi	Sergeant 'Aussie' Drake	Feature film
1966	They're a Weird Mob	Dennis	Feature film
1971	Wake in Fright (aka Outback)	Charlie	Feature film
1971	Walkabout	Father	Feature film
1972	Sunstruck (aka Education of Stanley Adams)	Mick Cassidy	Feature film
1974	The Dove	Tim	Feature film
1974	The Cars That Ate Paris	The Mayor	Feature film
1975	Sidecar Racers	Ocker Harvey	Feature film
1975	Inn of the Damned	George Parr	Feature film
1975	Ride a Wild Pony	Charles Quayle	Feature film
1976	The Fourth Wish	Casey	Feature film
1976	State of Exchange		Short film
1977	Born to Run	Delaney	Feature film
1977	The Picture Show Man	Maurice 'Pop' Pym	Feature film
1982	Heatwave	Freddie Dwyer	Feature film
1983	The Wild Duck	Old Ackland	Feature film
1984	The Camel Boy	Voice	Animated feature film
1986	Crocodile Dundee	Walter Reilly	Feature film
1987	Bullseye	Merritt	Feature film
1987	Frenchman's Farm	Bill Dolan	Feature film
1988	The Everlasting Secret Family	The Judge	Feature film
1988	Crocodile Dundee II	Walter Reilly	Feature film
1989	Triipe	Father	Short film

=== Television ===
Year	Production	Role	Type
1957	Rope		TV play
1959	Shell Presents	Everett / Traveller	Anthology series, 2 episodes: "Thunder of Silence", "A Tongue of Silver"
1960	Inside Story	George Webster	Episode: "A Girl for George"
1960	Probation Officer	John Reynolds	1 episode
1960	Chasing the Dragon	Sub-Inspector Martin	TV play
1960	A Moon for the Misbegotten	James Tyrone	TV play
1960–1961	No Hiding Place	Phil Hayward / Leslie Mason	2 episodes
1961	One Step Beyond	Henry Soames	Anthology series, episode: "Eyewitness"
1961	A Chance of Thunder	Martin	6 episodes
1961–1962	Armchair Theatre	Harry Hopkins / Michael Beckford	Anthology series, 2 episodes
1962	Compact	Harvey Flinders	Episode: "Press Reception"
1962	The Caucasian Chalk Circle	Azdak	Miniseries, 2 episodes
1962–1963	Drama 61-67	Teddy / Jim Driscoll	Anthology series, 2 episodes: "No Decision", "Rosemary"
1962; 1965	Edgar Wallace Mysteries	Ross Williams / Johnnie Gordon	2 episodes: "Death Trap'", "Dead Man's Chest"
1963	BBC Sunday-Night Play	Mr Rogers	Anthology series, episode: "The Remarkable Incident at Carson Corners"
1963	The Plane Makers	Davey Rankin	2 episodes
1963	Man of the World	Major Teong	Episode: '"The Enemy"
1963	Teletale	Raymond Parker	Anthology series, episode: "The Black Madonna"
1963	ITV Television Playhouse	Stan / Brian Davey	Anthology series, 2 episodes: "Beachhead", "They Don't Make Summers Like They Used To"
1963–1967	ITV Play of the Week	Halfdeck Escourt / Cpl. Ernest / Steve Moriarty	3 episodes
1964	First Night	Bluey	Anthology series, episode: "Day of the Drongo"
1964	The Third Man	Bill	Episode: "A Crisis in Crocodiles"
1964	ITV Sunday Night Drama	Peter	Anthology series, episode: "Sunday Mystery Theatre: "Weekend at Willaburra"
1964	A Local Boy		TV play
1965	The Recruiting Officer	Plume	TV play
1965	The Worker	J.A. Deerfoot	Episode: "A Democratic Democratism"
1965	Armchair Mystery Theatre	Mallory	Anthology series, episode: "The Hunter"
1965	The Troubleshooters	Conway	Episode: "The Way It Crumbles"
1965	Riviera Police	Lew Scarsdale	Episode: "Take it Sideways and Pray"
1965	Out of the Unknown	Dr. Sheffield	Episode: "Sucker Bait"
1966	Arthur! And the Square Knights of the Round Table	King Arthur (voice)	Animated series, 3 episodes
1966–1968	My Name's McGooley, What's Yours?	Wally Stiller	88 episodes
1968	Rita and Wally	Wally	8 episodes
1969	Riptide	Luke Russell	Episode: "Flight of the Curlew"
1969; 1970	Skippy	Nimble Norris	2 episodes
1970	Woobinda, Animal Doctor		Episode: "The Loaded Message"
1970	The Rovers	Bruce Hunter	Episode: "A Touch of Yellow"
1970	The Link Men	Bert Whitman	Episode: "Somebody's Kid Is Missing"
1970	Delta	Jim Garrick	Episode: "The Short Sell"
1970	Australian Plays	Wally Sillerish / Producer / Tom	Anthology series, 2 episodes: "Face of a Man", "The Juggler"
1970	Division 4	Morgan	Episode: "Dark Afternoon"
1971	Matlock Police	Ernie Parker	Episode: "Pressure Point"
1971	Dynasty	Walter McGarren Jr	Episode: "Full Circle"
1971	Bellbird		16 episodes
1971	Bachelor Gaye	Sid Gaye	
1971; 1972	Spyforce	Owen Davies / John Carpenter	
1971–1973	The Comedy Game	Lift Mechanic	4 episodes
1972	The Far Country		Miniseries, 6 episodes
1972	Lane End	Ray Dunlop	7 episodes
1972–1973	Over There	Cyril Kirby	25 episodes
1973	Homicide	Constable Laurie Nolan	Episode: "The Kooranda Killing"
1973	The Evil Touch	Sam Field	Episode: "The Homecoming"
1974	The Fourth Wish	James Casey	Miniseries
1974	Escape from Singapore	Narrator	TV movie
1976	Arena	Bernie Gold	TV movie
1976	Luke's Kingdom	Corporal Morris	Episode: "Devil's Man"
1977	The Outsiders	Bill Picker	Episode: "Opal Strike"
1978	Case for the Defence	Robert Lattimer	Episode: "The Family Way"
1978	Tickled Pink	Harry	Episode: "Palace of Dreams"
1978	Bit Part	Tommy	TV movie
1978	Shimmering Light	Eric Stuart	TV movie
1978	Father, Dear Father in Australia	George Randall	Episode: "A Home from Home"
1980	Timelapse	Premier Dakin	12 episodes
1983	The Dismissal	Sir John Kerr	Miniseries, 3 episodes
1983	Scales of Justice	Barry Barnes, Deputy State Premier	Miniseries, episode: "The Numbers"
1985	A Country Practice	Mr Smith	2 episodes
1985	The Man in the Iron Mask	Porthos	Animated TV movie
1985	The Dunera Boys	Brigadier Templeton	Miniseries, 2 episodes
1986	The Blue Lightning	Dr William Giles	TV movie
1986	King Solomon's Mines	Captain John Goode	Animated TV movie
1988	Outback Bound	Nobby	TV movie

== Theatre ==
Year	Production	Role	Type
1946	Whiteoaks	Master Wakefield	Independent Theatre, Sydney
	Dick Whittington	The Hero	Mosman Children's Theatre, Sydney
1947	The Water Babies		Theatre Royal Sydney with J. C. Williamson's
1948	The First Joanna	Phillip Deveron	Metropolitan Theatre, Sydney
1948	The Guinea Pig		Minerva Theatre, Sydney with Whitehall Productions
1948	A Midsummer Night's Dream	Puck	Metropolitan Theatre, Sydney, Killara Soldiers Memorial Hall
1948	The Winslow Boy	Ronnie Winslow	Minerva Theatre, Sydney with Whitehall Productions
1949	Pirates at the Barn	Michael	Darlington Deaf & Dumb Institute, Minerva Theatre, Sydney with Mosman Children's Theatre
1950	The Tragedy of Julius Caesar		Independent Theatre, Sydney
1950	The Pied Piper of Hamelin		Theatre Royal Sydney with J. C. Williamson's
1951	Hamlet	Laertes	Metropolitan Theatre, Sydney
1951–1952	King Lear		Theatre Royal, Adelaide, Comedy Theatre, Melbourne, Albert Hall, Canberra with John Alden Company
1951–1952	A Midsummer Night's Dream		Theatre Royal, Adelaide, Comedy Theatre, Melbourne with John Alden Company
1952	The Merchant of Venice		Comedy Theatre, Melbourne, Theatre Royal, Adelaide, Albert Hall, Canberra with John Alden Company
1952	The Merry Wives of Windsor	Servant	Comedy Theatre, Melbourne, Theatre Royal, Adelaide, Albert Hall, Canberra with John Alden Company
1952	The Winter's Tale	Servant	His Majesty's Theatre, Perth
1953	Death of a Salesman	Hap	Independent Theatre Sydney
1955	Top of the Bill		Phillip St Theatre, Sydney
1955	Hamlet		Phillip St Theatre, Sydney
1955	Winter Journey		Independent Theatre, Sydney
1955–1956	Happy Returns		Phillip St Theatre, Sydney
1956	The Reluctant Debutante	David Bullock	Theatre Royal Sydney, His Majesty's Theatre, Brisbane, His Majesty's Theatre, Perth, Theatre Royal, Adelaide & NZ tour with J. C. Williamson's
1957–1958	Cross Section		Phillip St Theatre, Sydney
1964	Rattle of a Simple Man		Phillip St Theatre, Sydney
1965	The Recruiting Officer		ABC TV Studios, Sydney
1970	Face of a Man		Majestic Cinemas, Sydney
1972	The Dock Brief		AMP Theatrette, Sydney with Q Theatre Company
1979	The Club	Jack	Newcastle Civic Theatre with Hunter Valley Theatre Company
1980	Born in the Gardens	Mo	Theatre Royal Sydney with Knightsbridge Theatrical Productions

== Radio (partial) ==
Year	Production	Role	Type
1940s–1950s	Medical File		Grace Gibson Productions
1941	The Search for the Golden Boomerang	Aboriginal boy	2UW, 2KO
1944	Bush Christmas		ABC Radio
1945	The Gangos	Bricky	ABC Radio
1947	Stumpy	Stumpy	ABC Radio
1947	Treasure Island	Jim Hawkins	
1947	David Copperfield	Young David	2CH
1950s	Cadbury Show		2GB
1951–1952	Dossier on Dumetrius	Major Gregory Keen	Grace Gibson Productions
1954	Fat Man		2UW
c.1954	Stairway to Fame		Grace Gibson Productions
1955	On the Waterfront	Terry	The General Motors Hour
1956	A Bullet Is Waiting		2UW / 4BC
1956–	Around the World in 80 Days		Grace Gibson Productions
1958	They're a Weird Mob	Nino	
1959	From Here to Eternity	Maggio	The General Motors Hour
1959–	Squad Room	Jim Brady	Grace Gibson Productions
c.1959–	Command Performance		
1960s	Cop this Lot		Grace Gibson Productions
	Budge's Gang		ABC Radio
	Land of the Rainbow		ABC Radio
	Candle in the Wind		
	Rebecca		
	Blue Hills		
	Death of a Salesman	Riff	
	Adopted Son	Vincent	

== Discography ==
=== Singles ===
List of singles, with Australian chart positions
Year	Title	Peak chart positions
Year	Title	AUS
1967	"Hot Pie and Tomato Sauce"	-
1977	"Tap Tap"/"Picture Show Man" (with John Ewart)	80
1987	"The One That Got Away" (with Tommy Moeller)	-

== Awards and honours ==
Year	Nominated work	Award	Category	Result
1977	The Fourth Wish	AACTA Awards	AACTA Award for Best Actor in a Leading Role	Won
1977	The Picture Show Man	Australian Film Institute Awards	Best Actor in a Lead Role	Nominated
1979	John Meillon	Queen's Birthday Honours	OBE for Service to Theatre	Honoured
1979	Bit Part	Logie Awards	Best Actor	Won
1983	The Wild Duck	Australian Film Institute Awards	Best Actor in a Supporting Role	Nominated
1984	The Dismissal	Logie Awards	Best Supporting Actor	Won
1988	The Everlasting Secret Family	Australian Film Institute Awards	Best Actor in a Supporting Role	Nominated
1989	John Meillon	AACTA Awards	Raymond Longford Lifetime Achievement Award (posthumous)	Honoured
