= Death Trap (film) =

1962 British film by John Moxey

- Theatrical release poster
- Directed by: John Moxey
- Screenplay by: John Roddick
- Produced by: Jack Greenwood
- Starring: Albert Lieven Barbara Shelley John Meillon
- Edited by: Derek Holding
- Music by: Bernard Ebbinghouse
- Production company: Merton Park Studios
- Distributed by: Anglo-Amalgamated
- Release date: 1 November 1962
- Running time: 56 minutes
- Country: United Kingdom
- Language: English

Death Trap (also known as Deathtrap) is a 1962 British film directed by John Moxey and starring Albert Lieven, Barbara Shelley and John Meillon. It is part of the long-running series of Edgar Wallace Mysteries films made at Merton Park Studios.

== Plot ==
Fashion model Carol Halston's sister has committed suicide, shortly after withdrawing £7,000 from her bank. Investigating, Carol visits financier Paul Heindrik, which leads to blackmail and murder. Eventually, when Heindrik is revealed as the murderer, he attempts to kill Carol and also his secretary, but is thwarted by the arrival of the police.

== Cast ==
- Albert Lieven as Paul Heindrik
- Barbara Shelley as Jean Anscomb
- John Meillon as Ross Williams
- Mercy Haystead as Carol Halston
- Kenneth Cope as Derek Maitland
- Leslie Sands as Det.-Insp. Simons
- Barry Linehan as Det.-Sgt. Rigby
- Richard Bird as Ted Cupps
- Gladys Henson as Housekeeper
- Murray Hayne as Ramsey
- Barbara Windsor as Babs Newton

== Critical reception ==
The Monthly Film Bulletin wrote: "A not very lively addition to the Edgar Wallace series, this is a! static, highly talkative affair which sluggishly works its way to a"
