= Olive (film) =

- Written by: Anthony Wheeler
- Directed by: Stephen Wallace
- Starring: Kerry McGuire; Nick Tate
- Country of origin: Australia
- Original language: English

Original release
- Release: 1988

Olive is a 1988 Australian television film about actress Olive Bodill, who died of cancer in 1984. The film was written by Bodill's husband Anthony Wheeler. It first screened in February 1988 on the ABC.

== Cast ==
- Kerry McGuire as Olive Bodill
- Nick Tate as Anthony Wheeler
- Owen Weingott as Vincent
- Lyn James as Doreen
- Elaine Lee as Elaine
- Moya O'Sullivan as Saleslady
- Richard Meikle as Mr Crawford
- Stephen Leeder as Dr Douglas

== Accolades ==
1988 Australian Film Institute Awards

- Best Lead Actress in a Telefeature - Kerry McGuire - won
- Best Performance by an Actor in a Leading Role in a Telefeatur - Nick Tate - nominated
- Best Telefeature - Richard Brennan - nominated
- Best Achievement in Direction in a Telefeature - Stephen Wallace - nominated

1988 AWGIE Awards

- Major AWGIE Award - Anthony Wheeler
