= Moving Out (film) =

- Directed by: Michael Pattinson
- Written by: Jan Sardi
- Produced by: Jane Ballantyne; Michael Pattinson
- Starring: Vince Colosimo
- Cinematography: Vince Monton
- Edited by: Robert Martin
- Music by: Umberto Tozzi
- Distributed by: Greater Union
- Release date: 1983
- Running time: 91 minutes
- Country: Australia
- Language: English
- Budget: A$540,000
- Box office: A$235,261 (Australia)

Moving Out is a 1983 film about a young Italian-Australian adolescent in Melbourne directed by Michael Pattinson.

Pattinson met Jan Sardi, who was a school teacher wanting to move into writing. They discussed making the movie as a 50-minute film and it evolved into a feature. Most of the money was raised privately except for $50,000 from the Australian Film Commission.

The movie was shot over six weeks in various schools in inner Melbourne. It was shot on 16 mm and blown up to 35mm.

== Story ==
Gino Condello (Vince Colosimo) is an Italian Australian high school student in the inner suburb of Fitzroy in Melbourne.

Gino's best mate is the hyperactive class clown Renato (Maurice Devincentis) and the pair like to hang around in a wrecked car in a derelict lot with bogan, mullet-decorated Allan (Tibor Gyapjas), and blonde Sandy (Sally Cooper) who is infatuated with Gino, and the boisterous, blunt, overweight Helen (Desiree Smith).

Gino's father (Peter Sardi) and mother (Kate Jason) are routinely worried by the behaviour and attitudes of their teenage son, caught between the two worlds of being a 'wog' and being an Australian, not helped because they aren't fluent in English, and need Gino to help them interact with the Anglo world.

In the corner of the kitchen, like a brooding, rosary-wielding presence, sits a grandmother (Josephine Russian) clearly not long for this world.

Gino's world is flung into further turmoil by the arrival from Italy of some 'cousins' who will take over the family home in inner-urban Fitzroy, while Gino and his family will move out to the plush Italian mansion lifestyle of Doncaster - especially as the new arrivals include the disturbingly serene and angelic Maria (Nicole Miranda), though the new arrivals also include the irritating young Pippo (Julio Dalleore), who is always bugging Gino about something.

At school Gino endures a series of battles - the deaf old English teacher Mr Aitkins (Brian James) insists that he recite Dorothea Mackellar's poem "My Country" ("I love a sunburnt country") which has absolutely no meaning for his inner urban lifestyle

Art teacher Miss Stanislaus (Sandy Gore) encourages Gino to make a sculpture of a clenched fist, while the no nonsense science teacher Mr. Clarke (Ivar Kants) dishes it out to his charges as he gives them a lesson in static electricity.

Gino hangs loose with his mates, drinking beer and smoking, playing pinball, arguing with his parents, and deliberately mis-translating to his father what Mr Clarke has to say about his schoolwork.

Romantic matters build to a head when Gino dances with Maria at an Italian party in Doncaster, but then egged on by Renato, who says he knows the owner, Gino decides with the rest of the gang to break into an up-market home.

Renato pairs off with Helen and it seems that at last Gino might make out with Sandy, but just as they get to kissing stage, the cops arrive.

Gino and Sandy make a break for it, but inevitably Gino and his parents are dragged down to the station for a dressing down.

The trouble with the law is swept away by a flurry of incidents - the school's toilet block catches fire because of a wayward student cigarette, Mr Clarke's class is disrupted by a fart, Gino's grandmother dies, and soon enough it's time for Gino to say farewell to his old classmates, his old school and his old teachers.

The removal van arrives and there's just time for a few more reconciliations, as Maria smiles and waves Gino farewell, and Gino drags a Collingwood football club beanie over Pippo's head.

"That it?", asks the removalist, as Gino contemplates the red fist sculpture broken by Pippo, and says it is.

"Right, let's go", the removalist adds, as the van pulls into the street, and the camera cranes up to give us a last sight of Gino as he heads away from Fitzroy, into the wilds of an uncertain future in doric-pillared Doncaster ...

== Cast ==
- Vince Colosimo as Gino
- Sally Cooper as Sandy
- Tibor Gyapjas as Allan
- Maurice Devincentis as Renato
- Desiree Smith as Helen
- Sandy Gore as Miss Stanislaus

== Production ==
Director Michael Pattinson made much later in publicity of his casting techniques for the film, claiming that he had seen and interviewed some 2,000 teenagers in Melbourne schools.

Pattinson in the first instance avoided standard audition techniques and instead asked the teenagers to tell jokes:

"Schools were very helpful when we lined up auditions for the kids," Mr Pattinson says. "We'd ask the kids to tell a joke, one with a story, it didn't matter how dirty. It turned out to be a good test of whether they could act in front of a camera." (The Age 19 April 1983)

According to another press report:

The experience was so much fun that he and his scriptwriter, Jan Sardi, rewrote some of the film's characters around the school kids they'd met" (Sydney Morning Herald, 19 May 1983)

For all the talk of the wide-ranging casting exercise, in some areas the seed fell close to the tree. Vince Colosimo was a former student of Jan Sardi's at St Josephs Marist Brothers College in North Fitzroy - the running joke is that Sardi failed him in drama in his first year.(In the DVD commentary, when Colosimo asks why Sardi failed him, Sardi tells him to "come on", he was a rebel and that can be seen in the film).

As if to confirm his rebellious streak, in the DVD commentary, Colosimo says he didn't know a joke and didn't want to tell a joke that he didn't think would be very funny. He claims the kids at his school thought they were auditioning for roles as extras in Cop Shop and remembers all the boys who stayed back did so because they hoped to meet that show's cast members, Linda Stoner and Paula Duncan.

Maurice Devincentis, who plays Gino's best friend Renato, was also a former student of Sardi's ("he always broke me up in class", Sardi recalled for Neil Jillett, op. cit.).

Desiree Smith recalls in the DVD interviews that Pattinson first met her as she frolicked in the fountain outside the Victorian 'national' art gallery. He subsequently met her at a drama school located in the small south eastern Melbourne suburb of Hawksburn, next to South Yarra.

Peter Sardi confesses he was about 29 when asked to play a character in his forties - he'd met director Pattinson when Pattinson was doing a student film at Swinburne Tech. Sardi played a crucial role in the film, workshopping all the young actors, and taking a dialogue coach credit.

Nicole Miranda, who played Maria, was interested in classical ballet and her younger sister Pia Miranda would go on to a career in film and television.

Sandy Gore, who plays the art teacher was then working in Melbourne theatre, which is how Pattinson knew her work.

These various "local" connections should be remembered, up against the notion that the cattle call search produced major results for the film (for more on the project's script development and casting see point 8 below)

Perhaps the best thing about the DVD interview featurette is Vince Colosimo reminiscing about the things he found confusing about making feature films - getting up at 6 am, only to hang around, shooting out of continuity, and shooting at all sorts of locations, in order to construct a scene.

As a result of the low budget flexible 16mm approach, the crew travelled to a variety of inner Melbourne locations. Schools filmed included Brunswick Tech, where the toilet catches, fire, but with a POV shot filmed at a school in South Melbourne. Other schools included St Josephs, where scriptwriter Jan Sardi had taught Vince Colosimo.

The film is in fact a homage to inner city Melbourne suburbs, including Brunswick, Fitzroy, South Melbourne and Collingwood - and a couple of Melbourne's major religions - Catholicism and Australian Rules football. These are extensively represented by way of memorabilia, from rosary beads to Ron Barassi.

That said, according to the DVD interview featurette, most of the interiors were shot in studios - at the Werribee Park studios for the school interiors, and at Fred Schepisi's Film House studio in Fitzroy for the kitchen and bedroom in Gino's Fitzroy home (the hallway and the bathroom were at separate real locations).

Many of the real locations - such as the docklands railway yards - have substantially changed since filming took place, and as a result, the film catches inner city views now lost to time. However Michael Pattinson, in the DVD commentary claims that the pinball parlour featured in the film, "the Blue Room", was still operational and still looked much the same at the time the DVD commentary was done (c. 2005).

According to the DVD interview featurette, the newspaper posters seen in the film were real and are a good guide to dating the actual period of the shoot.

In this case, it would seem that the film's six week, six days a week shoot, took place in February and March 1982. The Herald poster about PM sees Thompson, posing the question Poll?, references then Prime Minister Malcolm Frazer seeing then Victorian Premier Mr Thompson about a date for a state election, which Thompson would lose to Labor rival John Cain.

The poll date was set and the campaign was well under way by late March, with the Sydney Morning Herald on 25 March 1982 recording a TV confrontation between Thompson and Cain.

Another street poster references the Oakleigh Plate, which is a group one race that has been held near the end of February since it was first run in 1884.

This might help explain why Vince Colosimo and Desiree Smith both grumble that the first day of the shoot was located in the wrecked car, which the unit had placed in tall grass in the Melbourne suburb of Brunswick. It was a very windy 40-42 degree day, and in one shot it is possible to see smoke in the car escaping through a hole in the roof, which had been cut in to help with lighting, and possibly with ventilation.

According to director Michael Pattinson, he encouraged improvisation:

On set, the bravado of his young leads was so infectious that they adopted the practice of letting a scene go on beyond the words on the page.

"I let the cameras roll on them, until I yelled stop. We shot anything spontaneous that happened, and a lot of it stayed in the final cut of the film." (Sydney Morning Herald, 19 May 1983).

The treatment of language was a conscious and distinctive feature of the production, deriving from Jan Sardi's own experiences with language.

Instead of subtitling the Italian language, or having the Italian characters speak English, the decision was made to allow the characters to speak a mix of unsubtitled Italian and English, on the basis that the members of the Italian families, speaking in the Italian style, were expressive enough and as a result it was pretty clear what was going on.

Sardi notes in the DVD commentary adds that at the time it wasn't cool to be seen as Italian and so a lot of the kids at the school attempted to hide their migrant background. Kids would talk to their parents in English and the parents would talk back in Italian, so the production decision was part of the film's theme, of being caught between two cultures. It helped Sardi write the scenes, knowing that the drama could proceed without worrying that they would have to be subtitled.

In the DVD commentary, Colosimo notes he didn't speak English until he was four or five years old, and when he went to primary school, he and his twin brother and sister used to take home notes from the teacher asking his parents to speak more English in the home, because their two boys were having difficulty at school - the only trouble being that his mother and father couldn't read the note.

According to Colosimo, when the film was shown, in mixed audiences with Italian and English speakers, the film got two different sets of laughs - citing as an example one laugh coming in the parent-teacher scene, where Gino is translating what his teacher says for his father, and the other laugh coming when the father smiles at the terrible news Gino is supposed have told his father about his school work.

The film is relatively low tech and basic in its coverage, as Michael Pattinson himself notes on a number of occasions in the DVD commentary, pointing out the few occasions when the production could afford a flourish, such as the crane shot at the end. The low tech style had its rewards however - Pattinson notes that it was the use of abundant talcum powder at Melbourne airport by the film's grip that allowed Pippo to eventually make his slide down the escalator railing.

== Release ==
Sardi contrasts the film to the comedy stylings of shows such as They're A Weird Mob, calling the film a social neo-realist look at real life, showing what was really happening to Italian kids and families at a precise point in Melbourne time.

Colosimo recalls the conventional portraits of Italians in such shows as the TV sitcom Kingswood Country, which had the migrant character called a 'dago' throughout, and a Paul Hogan sketch about "Luigi the unbelievable". Hogan routinely traded in stereotypes about Aborigines and migrants.

Colosimo remembers these as the two most prominent "Eyties"/immigrants on television.

In this sense, the film was charting relatively new territory for the revival, and not surprisingly Roadshow and Hoyts passed on the picture, with GUO agreeing to pick it up.

In the DVD commentary, director Michael Pattinson recalls the film played for almost 26 weeks in cinemas around Australia, built largely by word of mouth, though Vince Colosimo remembers attending a big, scary and exciting premiere of the film in Adelaide, a launch that was supposed to have been the biggest staged since Urban Cowboy.

According to press reports of the time, some 2,000 teenagers turned up to Adelaide airport to mob Colosimo

In the DVD interview featurette, Pattinson notes the film never broke wide, but it played in for long runs in smaller theatres, and schools became involved, with the film included in syllabus work (no doubt the film tie-in, which had Helen Garner's name attached, also helped).

According to producer Jane Ballantyne, GUO treated the film well and with care, and this extended the film's theatrical run, so that, long after it ceased playing nights, it was still doing day sessions where it played to schools (though of course there's less money per head in catering to the education market).

The Sydney Morning Herald on 30 May 1983 carried a report on this aspect of the film's release:

"… the film is being used as a school project - a stimulus to discussion of immigrant problems, peer group tensions and education failings. Thousands of Vince's peer group have been taken to see it - and his teenage relatives are always on the phone wanting to know the answers to questions like "Why is Gino shy about sex and sometimes embarrassed by his friend Renato?" (SMH, 30 May 1983)

The film was given good domestic reviews, and this probably helped it reach a school audience.

According to Film Victoria's report on domestic Australian box office, the film did $235,261. This is an okay figure relative to budget and, with the 10BA tax breaks, it would have been enough to put the film's early 10BA investors in the black, and so might be called a modest success.

The film also didn't travel that well internationally, at least in major markets like the United States, being perceived as just another Italian story in a market already full of such stories, not to mention competition from Italian-themed films. (For example, Peter Yates' 1979 Breaking Away made a meal out of Dennis Christopher's desire to be an Italian bicycling champion).

However, according to David Stratton in 1990, citing Pattinson, it did have some success:

The film was well reviewed and did good business, eventually returning most of its costs. 'It sold to about thirty or forty countries,' says Pattinson, 'and it's frequently shown on the BBC.'

Producer Jane Ballantyne also notes it was often shown by critic Margaret Pomeranz during her SBS years.

While the film was more a domestic critical success than a break out commercial hit, it was widely seen, and attracted the teen demographic, courtesy a number of appealing qualities, not least Vince Colosimo. It also became one of the first Australian 'teen friendly' pictures to have a catch phrase in "Bye Gino".
