= Gail (1979 film) =

- Directed by: John Gauci
- Written by: Keith Thompson
- Starring: Sally Cooper
- Release date: 1979
- Running time: 50 minutes
- Country: Australia
- Language: English

Gail is a 1979 Australian television film written by Keith Thompson and directed by John Gauci. Thompson's script won an AWGIE from the Australian Writers Guild. It was part of ABC's Season of Australian Plays.

== Cast ==
- Sally Cooper as Gail Edwards
- Terry Gill as Dad
- Nanette Wallace as Mum
- John Arnold as Glenn
- Jacki Kerin as Robyn
- Alma Joseph as Gran
- Eileen Price as Miss Dunn

== Reception ==
Writing in the Age Mark Lawrence said it was "another indication of television's too-rare willingness to tackle subjects of social significance without kowtowing to the tyranny of ratings." The Sydney Morning Herald's Garry Shelley stated that "Keith Thompson's script is a delight. He has captured the lower middle-class Australian to a T - accentuating his inadequacies, aspirations, his conversations laced with adjectives, and the attitude of turning a blind eye to the serious while making do with an amusing quip."

== Accolades ==
1980 Sammy Awards

- Best writer TV play - Keith Thompson -won
