= Kerry McGuire =

Australian actress

- Born: Sydney, New South Wales
- Education: National Institute of Dramatic Art (1964)
- Occupation: Actress
- Years active: 1963–2005
- Notable work: Olive, Runaway Island, Against the Wind, Home and Away

Kerry McGuire is an Australian actress.

== Early life ==
McGuire was born in Sydney, New South Wales, Australia. She studied at National Institute of Dramatic Art (NIDA), graduating with a Bachelor of Dramatic Acting in 1964.

== Career ==
=== Film and TV ===
McGuire's screen roles include her AACTA Award-winning role in Olive (1988) where she played the titular Olive Bodill, an actress battling cancer, Runaway Island (1982) as innkeeper Molly McKenzie and miniseries Against the Wind (1978) as Polly (also an innkeeper), the latter for which she won both a Sammy Award and a Logie Award. She later appeared as Diana Fraser, mother of doctors Lachlan and James Fraser on Home and Away, on and off from 1997–1999, reprising the role for 2 further episodes in 2005.

She made guest appearances throughout her career on tv series' such as Division 4, Riptide, Catwalk, Homicide, Boney, Certain Women, Skyways, Prisoner, Cop Shop, A Country Practice, Neighbours, Rafferty's Rules and G.P.

=== Stage ===
McGuire's long stage career included roles in Absurd Person Singular (a gender swapped The Odd Couple) at Sydney's Northside Theatre She also starred in Don's Party which toured Australia in 1973, Bedroom Farce (1979) and The Life and Adventures of Nicholas Nickleby (1983–1984).

== Acting credits ==
=== Film ===
Year	Film	Role	Notes
1971	Devlin	Joan Hunter	TV play
1977	Going Home		TV movie
1977	Mama's Gone A-Hunting	Concierge (uncredited)	TV movie
1978	Puzzle	Diana Carson	TV movie
1979	The Little Convict	Polly Nelson (voice)	Animated TV movie
1981	The Homicide Squad	Barbara Patista	TV movie
1982	Runaway Island	Molly McKenzie	TV movie
1982	Heatwave	Female TV Reporter	Feature film
1985	Fragments of Terror	Wife (uncredited)	Anthology film, segment: "The Coming"
1988	Olive	Olive Bodill	TV movie Won the 1988 Australian Film Institute Award for Best Lead Actress in a Telefeature

=== Television ===
Year	Film	Role	Notes
1965	The Stranger	Nurse	Miniseries, 1 episode
1967	Love and War		Miniseries, episode 3: "O'Flaherty, VC"
1969	Division 4	Patsy Jordan	TV series, 1 episode
1968	Riptide	Freda Phillips / Beryl Winton	TV series, 2 episodes
1968; 1972	Homicide	Elaine Harvey / Faye Hall / Patti Summers	TV series, 3 episodes
1970	Woobinda, Animal Doctor		TV series, 1 episode
1970	The Rovers	Dorrie	TV series, 1 episode
1970	Dynasty	Frank Halliday	TV series, 1 episode
1971	Catwalk	Kate MacKenzie	TV series, 1 episode
1972	Boney	Meena	TV series, 1 episode
1974	Silent Number	Clare Milson	TV series, 1 episode
1974	Our Man in the Company	Marcia	TV series, 1 episode
1975	Certain Women		TV series, 1 episode
1978	Father, Dear Father in Australia	Miss Wilson	TV series, 1 episode
1979	Against the Wind	Polly McNamara	Miniseries, 12 episodes Won 1979 Sammy Award for Best Actress. Won 1979 Logie for Best Performance by an Actress in a Major Role
1979	Skyways	Ann Driscoll	TV series, 1 episode
1981	Prisoner	Arna Johanssen	TV series, 2 episodes
1981	Cop Shop	Geraldine Shipton	TV series, 1 episode
1983–84	Runaway Island	Molly McKenzie	TV series, 8 episodes
1984	A Country Practice	Robyn Riley	TV series, 2 episodes
1987	Neighbours	Christine Wilton	TV aeries, 3 episodes
1987–88	Rafferty's Rules	Irene Doonan	TV series, 2 episodes
1993	G.P.	Reverend Pauline Ternier	TV series, 2 episodes
1997–99; 2005	Home and Away	Diana Fraser	TV series, 49 episodes

=== Theatre ===
Year	Film	Role	Notes
1963	Hotel Paradiso	Victoire the Maid	UNSW with NIDA
1963	The Shewing-Up of Blanco Posnet	Babsy	UNSW with NIDA
1963	Under Milk Wood	Rosie Robert / Mrs. Organ Morgan / Mrs. Dai Bread One	UNSW with Australian Elizabethan Theatre Trust
1963	Barnstaple / The House of Bernarda Alba	Helen / Bernarda	UNSW with Old Tote Theatre Company
1964	The Caucasian Chalk Circle		UNSW with Old Tote Theatre Company
1964	The Oresteia of Aeschylus	Queen Clytemnestra	Tent Theatre, Sydney with NIDA
1964	A Resounding Tickle	Middie Paradock	UNSW with NIDA
1964	The Sport of My Mad Mother	Patty	UNSW with NIDA & Australian Elizabethan Theatre Trust
1964	Still Life	Dolly	UNSW with NIDA & Australian Elizabethan Theatre Trust
1965	Ballad of the Drover's Wife	Narrator	UNSW with NIDA
1966; 1968	A Refined Look at Existence		Jane Street Theatre, Sydney, UNSW with Old Tote Theatre Company
1966	Halloran's Little Boat		Jane Street Theatre, Sydney, with NIDA
1967	The Lion in Winter		Independent Theatre, Sydney, with Australian Elizabethan Theatre Trust
1967	How's the World Treating You		Independent Theatre, Sydney, with Australian Elizabethan Theatre Trust
1968	This Old Man Comes Rolling Home		UNSW with Old Tote Theatre Company
1969	You Know I Can't Hear You When the Water's Running		Phillip Street Theatre, Sydney with Harry M. Miller
1973	Don's Party	Kerry	UNSW, Warner Theatre, Adelaide, Russell Street Theatre, Melbourne, Hunter Theatre, Sydney, Theatre Royal, Hobart, Playhouse, Perth, Canberra Theatre, Shepparton, Mildura, Wangaratta, Bendigo, Albury with Old Tote Theatre Company, J. C. Williamson's & NIDA
1977	The Business of Good Government		Assembly Hall, Sydney with Q Theatre Company
1977; 1978	Mothers and Fathers	Sally Longman	NIDA Parade Theatre, UNSW, Twelfth Night Theatre, Brisbane
1978	Dry Run	Myra Kendall	Twelfth Night Theatre, Brisbane
1978	There Were Giants in Those Days		Russell Street Theatre, Melbourne with MTC
1979	Bedroom Farce	Susannah	Her Majesty's Theatre, Sydney, Her Majesty's Theatre, Brisbane, Comedy Theatre, Melbourne, Opera Theatre, Adelaide, Perth, Townsville, Cairns with Australian Elizabethan Theatre Trust
1979	A Midsummer Night's Dream	Helena	Albert Park Amphitheatre, Brisbane with Queensland Theatre
1979; 1980	The Man Who Came to Dinner	Lorraine Sheldon	SGIO Theatre, Brisbane with Queensland Theatre, Melbourne Athenaeum with MTC
1980	Piaf	Toine	Comedy Theatre, Melbourne with Playbox Theatre Company
1983; 1984	Caravan		Sydney Opera House with Ensemble Theatre Company
1983; 1984; 1985	The Life and Adventures of Nicholas Nickleby	Madame Mantalini / Mrs Witterly / Mrs Snevellicci	Theatre Royal Sydney with STC for Sydney Festival, State Theatre, Melbourne with MTC, Festival Theatre, Adelaide
1984	An Act of Settlement		Sydney Opera House with Ensemble Theatre Company & with Australian Elizabethan Theatre Trust for Sydney Festival
1984	Stage Struck		Marian Street Theatre, Sydney, with Australian Elizabethan Theatre Trust
1984	Season's Greetings		Marian Street Theatre, Sydney, with Northside Theatre Company
1985	What If You Died Tomorrow?		Marian Street Theatre, Sydney, with Northside Theatre Company
1987	The Odd Couple		Northside Theatre, Sydney
1988	A Small Family Business		Northside Theatre, Sydney
1989	Passion Play		Sydney Opera House with Gary Penny Productions
1993	A Flea in Her Ear		NIDA Parade Theatre
1994	Heartbreak House		His Majesty's Theatre, Perth with Angel Productions
1995	The Real Thing		Marian Street Theatre, Sydney
1997	After-Play		Marian Street Theatre, Sydney, with Northside Theatre Company

==== As director ====
Year	Film	Role	Notes
1986	Otherwise Engaged	Director	Marian Street Theatre, Sydney with Northside Theatre Company

=== Radio ===
Year	Film	Role	Notes
1979	Silent Night, Lonely Night	Janet	ABC Radio, Brisbane

== Awards and nominations ==
Year	Nominated work	Award	Category	Result	Ref.
1988	Olive	Australian Film Institute Awards	Best Lead Actress in a Telefeature	Won	
1979	Against the Wind	Sammy Awards	Best Actress	Won	
1979	Against the Wind	Logie Awards	Best Performance by an Actress in a Major Role	Won	
