= The Rock Pool (film) =

- Directed by: Chris Thomson
- Written by: Colin Free
- Produced by: Eric Taylor
- Starring: Bunney Brooke Ed Devereaux Lyn James
- Release date: 1979
- Running time: 59 minutes
- Country: Australia
- Language: English

The Rock Pool is a 1979 Australian television film written by Colin Free and directed by Chris Thomson. It portrays a farmer whose brother's widow comes to live on his farm that he shares with his cousin that works as his housekeeper. It was part of ABC's Season of Australian Plays.

== Cast ==
- Bunney Brooke as Toddy
- Ed Devereaux as Ernie
- Lyn James as Myra

== Reception ==
The Sydney Morning Herald's Garry Shelley wrote that "Colin Free's comedy-drama is excellent television."

== Accolades ==
1980 Logie Awards

- Best actress in a single drama - Bunney Brooke - won
