= Studio 86 =

Television series

- Genre: Drama
- Starring: Gia Carides; Zoe Carides; Steve Bisley; Kevin Miles
- Country of origin: Australia
- Original language: English
- No. of seasons: 1
- No. of episodes: 8

Production
- Executive producer: John Croyston
- Producers: Oscar Whitbread; John Vomero
- Running time: 25 minutes

Original release
- Network: ABC
- Release: 30 September – 18 November 1986

Studio 86 is a 1986 Australian TV anthology series. It starred Gia Carides, Zoe Carides, Steve Bisley and Kevin Miles. It ran for eight episodes.

== Cast ==
- Gia Carides
- Zoe Carides
- Steve Bisley as Peter Faulkner
- John Howard as Author / My Buckmaster
- Kevin Miles
- Barry Otto as Mr Van Mint
- Melissa Jaffer
- Kerry Walker
- Genevieve Lemon
- Gerard Kennedy as Minas
- Neil Melville
- Paula Duncan as Glenda
- Sue Jones as Chris Faulkner
- Nique Needles

== Episodes ==
- Restoration Piece by Phillip Ryal (30 Sept 1986). GS John Howard, Barry Otto, Katrina Foster. An author's characters come to life.
- Ladies' Day by Grant Fraser (7 Oct 1986) GS Genevieve Lemon, Gillian Hyde, Kerry Walker. Three women try to drink in a pub.
- Strawberry Girl (14 Oct 1986) GS Zoe Carides. A woman creates an alter ego.
- An Electric Day (21 Oct 1986) GS Gerard Kennedy. The story of an electrician.
- What We Did in the Past (28 Oct 1986) GS Melissa Jaffer, Kevin Miles, Bill Young. Beach residents try to stop a disco.
- Many Are Called by Francis Chalmers (4 November 1986). Directed by Peter Dodds. GS Steve Bisley, Sue Jones. A man writes an article about corruption.
- Art'n'Life by Michael Gow (11 November 1986). GS Huw Williams, Margot Knight, Maggie Miller. A playwright's love life interferes with his career.
- Sisters in the Bathroom (18 November 1986). GS Gia Carides. Two teenage sisters have a gossip.
