= Dossa and Joe =

2002 television comedy series

- Country of origin: Australia
- No. of seasons: 1

Production
- Production company: Granada Australia

Original release
- Release: 2002

Dossa and Joe is a 2002 Australian television comedy series, created and co-written by Caroline Aherne. Peter Herbert served as co-writer.

Made by Granada Australia for the BBC, the Sydney-based series centres on a working class couple called Dossa and Joe. When Joe retires from his job as a factory worker, the couple realizes that they know very little about each other despite being married for forty years. Against Joe's wishes, the couple begins marriage counselling.

The series starred Anne Charleston as Dossa and Michael Caton as Joe. The cast also included Jeanie Drynan and Roy Billing.

While the series received positive reviews, there were some dissenters. The series failed to earn good ratings and was not renewed for a second series.

== Cast ==
- Anne Charleston as Dossa
- Michael Caton as Joe Bailey
- Jeanie Drynan as Vanessa
- Roy Billing as Charlie
- Darren Gilshenan as Wayne
- Ryan Johnson as Bobby Bailey
- Joel Edgerton as Robbo
