= How Do You Spell Matrimony? =

- Wednesday Theatre episode
- Episode no.: Season 1 Episode 28
- Directed by: Oscar Whitbread
- Teleplay by: Colin Free
- Original air dates: 14 July 1965; 8 September 1965 (Brisbane)
- Running time: 45 mins

Episode chronology
← Previous "The Dogs of Durga Das"	Next → "Waiting in the Wings"

"How Do You Spell Matrimony?" is a 1965 Australian television play by Colin Free. It appeared on a double bill as part of Wednesday Theatre with The Face at the Club House Door.

It was based on a radio play which had been performed in 1962.

The play was later adapted for radio as "A Walk Among the Wheeneys".

Free also developed it into a TV series, Nice 'n Juicy, (1966–67) starring John Ewart.

== Plot ==
Two brothers, one of whom decides to find a wife by correspondence. The lady turns up, but isn't quite what the two inexperienced brothers expect.

== Cast ==
- Peter Aanensen
- Paul Karo
- George Whaley
- Norman Yemm

== Duet on a Wednesday ==
It appeared as part of "Duet on Wednesday" is a 1965 Australian TV presentation on ABC TV of two new Australian plays by Colin Free, "How Do You Spell Matrimony?" and "Face at the Clubhouse Door". The whole show ran for 60 minutes and aired 14 July 1965.

"The Face at the Club House Door" was billed as "a satirical comedy".

Both were produced by Oscar Whitbread.
