= Simone de Beauvoir's Babies =

Australian television mini-series

- Written by: Deborah Cox
- Directed by: Kate Woods
- Starring: Leverne McDonnell, Anne Looby, Sonia Todd, Sally Cooper
- Composer: Jen Anderson
- Country of origin: Australia
- Original language: English
- No. of episodes: 4

Production
- Executive producers: Andrew Knight, Sue Masters, Jackie O'Sullivan, Stephen Vizard
- Producers: Deborah Cox, Andrew Knight, Denise Patience
- Cinematography: Jaems Grant
- Production companies: Australian Broadcasting Corporation, Artist Services Productions Pty Ltd

Simone de Beauvoir's Babies is a 1997 Australian television mini-series broadcast by the Australian Broadcasting Corporation in 1997.

The series comprises four one-hour episodes starring Sally Cooper, Anne Looby, Leverne McDonnell and Sonia Todd as women in their late 30s who are single, childless and aware of their biological clocks ticking down.

David Wenham won the 1997 Australian Film Institute Award for Best Lead Actor in Television Drama for his role as Ian.

The soundtrack for the series was composed by Jen Anderson.

== Cast ==
- Sally Cooper as Sue
- Anne Looby as Louise
- Leverne McDonnell as Dianne
- Sonia Todd as Karla
- David Wenham as Ian
- Phillip Gordon as Spud
- Jacek Koman as Ryko
- Peta Brady as Dianne, aged 17
- Asher Keddie as Karla, age 17
- Rod Mullinar as Mick
- Belinda McClory as Wendy
- Anne Phelan as Postie
- Bridie Carter as Dating Agent
