= Waterloo Station (TV series) =

1983–1984 Australian TV series

- Genre: Soap opera Drama
- Created by: Reg Watson
- Opening theme: Tony Hatch
- Country of origin: Australia
- Original language: English
- No. of seasons: 1
- No. of episodes: 40

Production
- Production company: Reg Grundy Organisation

Original release
- Network: Nine Network
- Release: 30 January 1983 – 7 February 1984

Waterloo Station is an Australian television soap opera that was first broadcast on 30 January 1983. It was created by Reg Watson and produced by the Reg Grundy Organisation for the Nine Network. The series began with a movie-length episode and continued on with hour long episodes. It was cancelled after 40 episodes.

== Synopsis ==
Waterloo Station focused on two sisters, both married to policemen, and their adult children starting careers in the police force. The main locations were a police station, a police training academy in Sydney, and a large boarding house that provided accommodation for several characters.

== Production ==
Waterloo Station was an attempt by Grundy's to reproduce for Channel Nine the success of their earlier shows The Restless Years and The Young Doctors which focused on youth situations. Like Crawford Productions' successful police series Cop Shop, Waterloo Station combined police procedural elements with domestic situations involving the police personnel and their families.

The series was recorded at the Eric Porter studios in North Sydney.

== Broadcast ==
The series was programmed against the popular new series Carson's Law and A Country Practice in key markets including Melbourne, and achieved only mediocre ratings. It was cancelled after 40 episodes. After it was taken off-air in the Eastern States, the show continued to air on NWS9 as it was performing "adequately" in Adelaide.

After Waterloo Station, on 18 April 1983, Grundy launched Starting Out, which featured youthful characters attempting to enter the medical profession. This series was similarly short-lived. Andrew Clarke, Danny Roberts and Sally Tayler all subsequently found greater success as regular cast members of another Grundy-produced soap opera, Sons and Daughters.

During late 1987, while The Midday Show was taking a break for Christmas, Nine Network Sydney replayed Waterloo Station on weekdays at 12pm followed at 1.00pm by US comedy TV series Private Benjamin. Waterloo Station has never been replayed since on commercial or pay TV in Australia.

== Cast ==
- Ron Graham – Jack Edwards
- Sally Tayler – Sally Edwards
- Pam Western – Liz Edwards
- John Bonney – George Logan
- Jenny Ludlam – Ann Logan
- Jennifer West – Rosie Wallace
- Malcolm Cork – David Keller
- Gerry Sont – Rick Thompson
- Danny Roberts – Trevor Brown
- Tex Morton – Harry McDowell
- Julianne White – Stacey Daniels
- Steven Grives – Steve Colby
- Bartholomew John – Tony Harris

== Episodes ==
No.	Title	Directed by	Written by	Original release date
1	"Episode 1"	Greg Shears	Reg Watson	30 January 1983
A mysterious jig-saw murderer terrorises the families of a detectives involved in the case. A young hitchhiker finds himself in precarious situation.
2	"Episode 2"	Alister Smart	Bretty Quin and C.McCourt	31 January 1983
3	"Episode 3"	Phillip East	David Phillips	7 February 1983
4	"Episode 4"	Pillip East	Rick Maier, John Misto and Bretty Quin	8 February 1983
5	"Episode 5"	Pillip East	Bretty Quin and Ian Coughlan	14 February 1983
David Keller confronts Rick about his feelings for the police trainee Sally Edwards.
6	"Episode 6"	Unknown	Unknown	15 February 1983
7	"Episode 7"	Unknown	Unknown	21 February 1983
A confession of Ann's disturbs George, Sally and Rick are sworn in as police constables.
8	"Episode 8"	Unknown	Unknown	24 February 1983
9	"Episode 9"	Unknown	Unknown	28 February 1983
10	"Episode 10"	Unknown	Unknown	3 March 1983
11	"Episode 11"	Unknown	Unknown	7 March 1983
12	"Episode 12"	Unknown	Unknown	10 March 1983
13	"Episode 13"	Unknown	Unknown	14 March 1983
14	"Episode 14"	TBD	TBD	1983
15	"Episode 15"	TBD	TBD	1983
16	"Episode 16"	TBD	TBD	1983
17	"Episode 17"	TBD	TBD	1983
18	"Episode 18"	TBD	TBD	1983
19	"Episode 19"	TBD	TBD	1983
20	"Episode 20"	TBD	TBD	1983
21	"Episode 21"	TBD	TBD	1983
22	"Episode 22"	TBD	TBD	1983
23	"Episode 23"	TBD	TBD	1983
24	"Episode 24"	TBD	TBD	1983
25	"Episode 25"	TBD	TBD	1983
26	"Episode 26"	TBD	TBD	1983
27	"Episode 27"	TBD	TBD	1983
28	"Episode 28"	TBD	TBD	1983
29	"Episode 29"	TBD	TBD	1983
30	"Episode 30"	TBD	TBD	1983
31	"Episode 31"	TBD	TBD	1983
32	"Episode 32"	TBD	TBD	1983
33	"Episode 33"	TBD	TBD	1983
34	"Episode 34"	TBD	TBD	1983
35	"Episode 35"	TBD	TBD	1983
36	"Episode 36"	TBD	TBD	1983
37	"Episode 37"	TBD	TBD	1983
38	"Episode 38"	TBD	TBD	1983
39	"Episode 39"	TBD	TBD	1983
40	"Episode 40"	David C. Wilson	David Phillips	7 February 1984

== Reception ==
Peter Wilmoth of The Age said of the first episode: "Waterloo Station will need time to develop. The first impression of Nine's new drama series is that it has enough excitement and reasonable acting to succeed. The second impression nags: it is lacking in subtlty (sic)." He later wrote: "Waterloo Station buried its initial promise in the cause of froth. Apart from the occasional moving scene, the show is frustratingly unsubtle and zealously protective of its clichés. The Sydney Morning Herald's Harry Robinson stated: "By literary standards, Waterloo Station is crude in its appeal to young people of scant education. It plays on youth's yen for feeling hard-done-by and alienated from oldies." Mike Carlton wrote in The Sydney Morning Herald: "a better title might be Cop Shop meets the Sons and Daughters off Certain Women for, as with the marching East Germans, there was more than a smidgeon of déjà vu about things." Also in The Sydney Morning Herald, Rosalind Reines called it "hammy but enthralling". Anthony Clarke of The Age commented: "We shouldn't expect too much from our soapies. But surely a prime-time evening show should be more than just a non-stop talk marathon devoid of drama, of action or romance".
