= Arena (miniseries) =

- Written by: Michael Craig
- Directed by: Eric Tayler
- Starring: John Meillon; Ray Barrett; John Ewart
- Country of origin: Australia
- Original language: English
- No. of episodes: 2 x 1 hour

Production
- Producer: Eric Tayler
- Production company: ABC

Original release
- Network: ABC
- Release: 1976

Arena is a 1976 Australian mini series about a lawyer who represents sportsmen.

== Cast ==
- John Meillon as Bernie Gold
- Ray Barrett as Col Burrows
- John Ewart
