= Bachelor Gaye =

Bachelor Gaye is an Australian television sitcom which first screened on the Nine Network in 1971. Lazy bachelor Sid Gaye moves in with his sister and her family, causing chaos.

== Production ==
Bachelor Gaye was supposed to run for 13 episodes and eight episodes were filmed but the series was short-lived when the Nine Network decided to axe it after five episodes. The series was written by Ralph Peterson.

== Cast ==
- John Meillon as Sid Gaye
- Jane Coghlan
- Al Thomas

== See also ==
- List of Australian television series
