= Frenchman's Farm =

- Theatrical film poster
- Directed by: Ron Way
- Written by: James Fishburn; Ron Way; Matt White
- Based on: original script by William Russell
- Produced by: James Fishburn; Matt White
- Starring: Tracey Tainsh; David Reyne; Ray Barrett; John Meillon; Norman Kaye
- Cinematography: Malcolm McCulloch
- Edited by: Pippa Anderson
- Music by: Tommy Tycho
- Production company: Mavis Bramston Productions
- Release date: 1986
- Running time: 86 minutes
- Country: Australia
- Language: English
- Budget: A$2.47 million
- Box office: A$2,780

Frenchman's Farm is a 1986 Australian horror mystery film.

== Plot synopsis ==
Jackie Grenville (Tracey Tainsh), a university law student, is motoring through rural Queensland, on her way to Brisbane, when her car breaks down.

When she attempts to seek help, Jackie finds herself at a property called 'Frenchman's Farm'. She inadvertently witnesses the murder of a World War II soldier by a man in French Revolutionary uniform. After discovering the soldier was killed in 1944, Jackie realises she has mysteriously travelled back in time to the 1940s.

Returning to her car, Jackie is transported back to present time. Unable to convince the authorities of what happened, she retraces her steps, with the help of her boyfriend Barry Norden (David Reyne). Together they return to the farm to investigate the murder and solve the mystery. In the process, they end up unearthing an unexpected fortune, an ancient curse and a string of murders – while trying to evade a crazed killer.

== Cast ==
- Tracey Tainsh as Jackie Grenville
- David Reyne as Barry Norden
- Norman Kaye as Reverend Aldershot
- John Meillon as Bill Dolan
- Ray Barrett as Harry Benson
- Phil Brock as John Hatcher
- Andrew Blackman as John Mainsbridge
- Andrew Johnston as William Morris
- Jennifer Flowers as Mrs. Grenville

== Production ==
Filming started 17 February 1986.
