= Shark's Paradise =

Australian television film

- Written by: David Phillips
- Directed by: Michael Jenkins
- Starring: David Reyne; Sally Tayler; Ron Becks
- Music by: Nigel Plunker
- Country of origin: Australia
- Original language: English

Production
- Producer: Carla Kettner
- Cinematography: Martin McGrath
- Editors: Ralph Strasser; Richard Hindley; Bill O'Donnell
- Running time: 94 minutes
- Production companies: Hanna-Barbera Australia; McElroy & McElroy
- Budget: $1.5 million

Original release
- Release: 1986

Shark's Paradise is a 1986 Australian television film directed by Michael Jenkins and starring David Reyne, Sally Tayler and Ron Becks. The film, about police on the Gold Coast, was heavily influenced by Miami Vice.

== Cast ==
- David Reyne as Rod Palmer
- Sally Tayler as Billie Riley
- Ron Becks as Monty Stone
- Dennis Miller as Inspector Rossiter
- John Paramor as Chief Inspector McGarry
- Sean Scully as Detective Charlie Kelly
- Peter Sumner as Cooper
- Peter Gwynne as Mayor
- Vincent Gil as Murphy
- Ralph Cotterill as Dr Baxter
- Lynda Stoner as Mrs Axelmere

== Reception ==
Jacqueline Lee Lewes in the Sun-Herald criticised the show, stating "There are some unspectacular car chases, some equally unexciting chases and a few shots of sharks swimmingly lazily about." The Sydney Morning Herald's Doug Anderson called it "Abject trash so frightful it cannot even be redeemed by the fact that it provided work for local actors and film technicians."

Barbara Hooks of The Age wrote "Sharks Paradise does have neat lines, although the bread and butter ones in between tend to be delivered flatly. And it has some appropriately off-the-wall performances, although David Reyne tends to cross the fine line between deadpan and wooden. Turn a blind eye to its flaws and enjoy it for the trendy romp it is intended to be." Garrie Hutchinson in The Age wrote "Director Michael Jenkins does his best to jazz up a lame script with beautiful night shots, a camera which has to sprint to keep up with the characters and an out-of-breath editor who must have RSI from the quick cuts — but to no avail." Also in The Age Pamela Bone ends "How can such a production be slow? The acting is as unconvincing as the story, the glitz and decadence of Surfers fails to come through and even the music can't drum up any excitement. Sharks Paradise tries to be frenetic, fast and funny. Throw it to the sharks."

A retrospective review, finding the film has more to do with Dead-end drive-in than with proper sharksploitation, concludes by stating: "Australians with a sense of humour about themselves may be left crying with laughter. And non-Aussies may have an even better time as they are presented this deranged advertisement for Queensland." Another review calls the film "A gloriously kitsch made-for-TV movie".
