= Stumpy (radio serial) =

1947 Australian radio serial by Ruth Park

Stumpy is a 1947 Australian radio serial by Ruth Park. It starred a teenage John Meillon. The serial ran for 140 episodes.

The serial was about a young boy and his family.

The Brisbane Mail praised the "First rate acting, plus neat slices of philosophy" saying "this column tips Ruth Park will use Stumpy and his shabby "world to better ends than mere entertainment. Get your children listening".

== Cast ==
- John Meillon as Stumpy
- Nancye Stewart as Stumpy's mother Mrs. McCrae
- Ben Gabriel as Stumpy's brother Kenny
