= Kevin Miles (Australian actor) =

Australian actor (1929–2024)

- Kevin Miles actor
- Born: Kevin Gordon Miles; 17 April 1929; Melbourne, Victoria, Australia
- Died: 13 September 2024 (aged 95); Rye, Victoria, Australia
- Occupation: Actor
- Years active: 1949–1997
- Known for: Carson's Law as Godfrey Carson; Dynasty as David Mason; The Power, The Passion as Gordon Miles

Kevin Gordon Miles (17 April 1929 – 13 September 2024) was an Australian actor of theatre, television and film.

He was best known for his small screen roles as Detective John Randall in The Link Men and as Godfrey Carson in the legal drama Carson's Law. Miles also appeared in Delta (1969), Dynasty (1970) and The Power, The Passion (1989).

== Early life ==
Miles was born on 17 April 1929 in Melbourne, Victoria, to a working class family as one of six children. He left school at age 12 or 13, but didn't have an interest in acting until his brother-in-law encouraged him to audition for the theatre.

== Career ==
Miles' career began in theatre in 1949, appearing in J.C. Williamson productions. He then moved to the United Kingdom, touring England and Europe with the Royal Shakespeare Company alongside Laurence Olivier and Vivian Leigh. In 1955 he also began appeared in television plays at the BBC.

In the late 1960s he began appearing in guest roles on Australian television series including Hunter, Contrabandits and Skippy the Bush Kangaroo before securing the one of his best known roles as Detective Sergeant John Randall in 1970 series The Link Men. He also appeared in Delta and Barrier Reef before undertaking the lead role of David Mason in Dynasty.

Guest roles followed throughout the 1970s in Boney, Ryan, The Evil Touch, Class of '75, Silent Number, Behind the Legend, Homicide, Division 4, The Young Doctors, Luke's Kingdom, Case for the Defence and King’s Men.

In 1983, Miles took on another of his best known roles as law firm owner Godfrey Carson in the legal drama Carson's Law alongside Lorraine Bayly. The role earned him a Logie Award for Best Lead Actor in a Series. He appeared in miniseries Nancy Wake and Darlings of the Gods, before undertaking another lead role in drama series The Power, The Passion in 1989.

Miles retired from acting in 1997, after his final role in the TV movie The Ripper.

== Death ==
Miles passed away in Rye, Victoria on 13 September 2024, at the age of 95.

== Awards ==
Year	Work	Award	Category	Result
	Dynasty	Penguin Award	Commemoration	Won
1984	Carson's Law	Logie Award	Best Lead Actor in a Series	Won

== Filmography ==
=== Film ===
Year	Title	Role	Type
1955	Othello	1st Gentleman	TV film
1956	The Petrified Forest	Ruby	TV film
1957	The Hasty Heart	Digger	TV film
1959	Antony and Cleopatra	Caesar	TV film
1961	The First Joanna	Halley van Drutten	TV film
1966	Antigone	Chorus Leader	TV film
1969	The Intruders	Meredith	Feature film
1972	Dust or Polish?	Dr Grimsby	TV film
1974	The Cars That Ate Paris	Dr. Midland	Feature film
1974	Eye of the Spiral		TV movie
1976	End Play	Charlie Bricknall	Feature film
1978	Weekend of Shadows	The Superintendent	Feature film
1978	The Chant of Jimmie Blacksmith	Knoller (uncredited)	Feature film
1978	The Tichborne Affair	Defence Counsel	TV film
1982	...Deadline	Thurber	TV film
1984	Conferenceville		TV film
1985	Emmett Stone	Emmett Stone	TV movie
1988	Boulevard of Broken Dreams	Geoff Bormann	Feature film
1988	Badlands 2005	Doc Demeter	TV film
1988	Evil Angels (aka A Cry in the Dark)	Professor Cameron	Feature film
1989	Darlings of the Gods	Lord Esher	TV film
1997	The Ripper	Sir William Fraser	TV film

=== Television ===
Year	Title	Role	Type
1957	The Adventures of Aggie	Jack Reynolds	Episode 24: "Cock and Bull"
1958	African Patrol	Jim Stevens / Roger	2 episodes
1967–1968	Contrabandits	John Coubert / Hoffman / Kraft	Seasons 1 & 2, 3 episodes
1967–1975	Homicide	Bill Standard / Dave Ellis / Kevin Davies / Billy Farrell	4 episodes
1968	Hunter	Brian Clarke	Episode 40: "The Late John Hunter"
1969	Skippy the Bush Kangaroo	Steven Lansbury	Season 3, episode 8: "The Veteran"
1969–1970	Delta	Brian Fitch	Seasons 1–2, 23 episodes
1969–1971	Dynasty	David Mason	Seasons 1–2, 24 episodes
1970	The Link Men	Detective Sergeant John Randall	13 episodes
1971	Barrier Reef	Edwards	Episode 4: "Strange Cargo"
1972	Elephant Boy	Prince Paddam	
1973	Boney	Martin Borredale	Season 2, episode 3: "Boney and the Strangler"
1973	Ryan	John Hiller	Episode 9: "The Messenger Birds"
1973	The Evil Touch	Bigelow	Episode 5: "Happy New Year, Aunt Carrie"
1973–1975	Division 4	State Manager / Colonel Harris / Simon 'The General' Lee	3 episodes
1974	Out of Love		Episode 2: "It Will Never Work"
1974	Silent Number	McGillrae / Hacking	2 episodes
1974	Eye of the Spiral		
1975	Behind the Legend	G.V. Brooke	Season 3, episode 5: "George Coppin"
1975	Class of '75	Jean-Pierre	10 episodes
1975	The Seven Ages of Man		Episode 5: "The Justice"
1975	The Company Men	Russell Cramm	Miniseries, 6 episodes
1975	Armchair Cinema	Brandon	Season 1, episode 6: "Tully"
1976	Luke's Kingdom	Wilmot	Miniseries, episode 12: "An Enemy Too Many"
1977	The Outsiders	Jack Flemming	Episode 10: "Charlie Cole Esq."
1977	The Young Doctors	Inspector Stafford	5 episodes
1978	Case for the Defence	Fulstrom	Episode 2: "The Killing of Toby McGee"
1979	King's Men		Episode 8: "Crusade"
1983–1984	Carson's Law	Godfrey Carson	TV series, 184 episodes
1986	Studio 86		Episode 5: "What We Did in the Past"
1987	Nancy Wake	Commander Busch	Miniseries, episode 1
1988	Joe Wilson	Grainger	Miniseries, episode 1: "Joe Wilson's Courtship"
1989	Mission: Impossible	General Eli Szabo	Season 2, episode 6: "War Games"
1989	The Power, The Passion	Gordon Byrne	TV series, 167 episodes
1990	More Winners	Magistrate	Season 2, episode 2: "Boy Soldiers"

== Theatre ==
Year	Title	Role	Type
1949	Fly Away Peter		Comedy Theatre, Melbourne, Theatre Royal, Adelaide, Theatre Royal Sydney with J. C. Williamson's
1949–1950	Much Ado About Nothing		Tivoli Theatre, Sydney, Theatre Royal, Adelaide with J. C. Williamson's & RSC
1949–1950	The Tragedy of Macbeth	Lord	Tivoli Theatre, Sydney, Theatre Royal, Adelaide with RSC
1950	Young Wives' Tale		Princess Theatre, Melbourne
1951	Jane, My Love		Theatre Royal, Hobart, National Theatre, Launceston
1952–1953	Seagulls Over Sorrento	Sub-Lieutenant Granger	Comedy Theatre, Melbourne, His Majesty's Theatre, Auckland, Theatre Royal, Adelaide, Theatre Royal Sydney, Victoria Theatre, Newcastle with J. C. Williamson's
1953	Reluctant Heroes		Victoria Theatre, Newcastle with J. C. Williamson's
1954	Othello	Senators, servants & soldiers	Shakespeare Memorial Theatre, Stratford with RSC
1954	A Midsummer Night’s Dream		Shakespeare Memorial Theatre, Stratford with RSC
1954	Romeo and Juliet		Shakespeare Memorial Theatre, Stratford with RSC
1954	The Taming of the Shrew	Nathaniel	Shakespeare Memorial Theatre, Stratford with RSC
1954	Troilus and Cressida		Shakespeare Memorial Theatre, Stratford with RSC
1955	Macbeth	Extra	Shakespeare Memorial Theatre, Stratford with RSC
1955	All’s Well That Ends Well	Courtier	Shakespeare Memorial Theatre, Stratford with RSC
1955	The Merry Wives of Windsor		Shakespeare Memorial Theatre, Stratford with RSC
1955; 1957	Titus Andronicus	Chiron	Shakespeare Memorial Theatre, Stratford, Sarah Bernhardt Theatre Paris, Teatro Le Fenice, Venice, National Theatre, Belgrade, Croatian National Theatre, Zagreb, City Theatre, Vienna, Polish Theatre, Warsaw, Stoll Theatre, London with RSC
1956	Strange Request	Michael Moor	New Theatre Oxford
1956	Alibi		Grand Theatre, Wolverhampton with Wolverhampton Repertory Company
1956	Ned Kelly	Dan Kelly	Elizabethan Theatre, Sydney
1956; 1957	The Rainmaker	Jim Curry	Elizabethan Theatre, Sydney, His Majesty's Theatre, Brisbane
1959	The Tunnel of Love		Roxy Theatre, Leeton
1959	Time Limit		Little Theatre, Melbourne
1961	The Dumb Waiter / The Room		Russell Street Theatre, Melbourne
1961	The World of Suzie Wong		Palais Theatre, Melbourne, Metro Cinema, Sydney
1961	The Caretaker		Russell Street Theatre, Melbourne
1961	Alice in Wonderland		Comedy Theatre, Melbourne with J. C. Williamson's
1962	Come Blow Your Horn	Alan Baker	Playhouse, Perth with AET Trust
1963	Do You Mind!		Phillip Street Theatre, Sydney
1963; 1964	The Wizard of Oz	Tin Man	Tivoli Theatre, Melbourne, Tivoli Theatre, Sydney
1964	Who's Afraid of Virginia Woolf?		Old Tote Theatre, Sydney, Albert Hall, Canberra, Theatre 62, Adelaide, Palace Theatre, Sydney
1966	Brecht on Brecht		Emerald Hill Theatre, Melbourne, Theatre 62, Adelaide
1966	Aspects of Love		Old Tote Theatre, Sydney
1967	The Typists		AMP Theatrette, Sydney with AET Trust
1968	Bell, Book and Candle		St Martins Theatre, Melbourne
1968	The Absence of a Cello	Otis Clifton	St Martins Theatre, Melbourne
1968	Twelfth Night		University of Melbourne with MTC
1968	She Stoops to Conquer		Independent Theatre, Sydney
1969	Henry IV, Part 1	Thomas Percy	Octagon Theatre, Perth, Keith Murdoch Court, Melbourne with MTC
1970	The Trial of the Catonsville Nine		Pitt Street Church, Sydney with Stable Productions
1975	Chez Nous		Old Tote Theatre, Sydney
1976	Absurd Person Singular		Theatre Royal, Hobart with Tasmanian Theatre Company
1976	The Brass Hat	Lt Colonel Guy Holden	Old Tote Theatre, Sydney
1976	Otherwise Engaged	Stephen	Old Tote Theatre, Sydney
1977	The School for Scandal	Sir Oliver Surface	Playhouse, Adelaide with STCSA
1977	Fifth Australian National Playwrights' Conference		Canberra
1977	Swansong for Antlers	Col Streger	Theatre 62, Adelaide with STCSA
1977	Annie Get Your Gun	Buffalo Bill	Playhouse, Adelaide with STCSA
1977	A Happy and Holy Occasion		Playhouse, Adelaide with Hunter Valley Theatre Company
1978	Oedipus the King / Oedipus at Colonus	Old Shepherd	Playhouse, Adelaide with STCSA
1978	Three O'Clock Farewell		Playhouse, Adelaide with STCSA
1978	Henry IV	Falstaff	Playhouse, Adelaide with STCSA
1978	Cymbeline	Iachimo	Playhouse, Adelaide with STCSA
1979	The Lady of the Camellias	M Duval	Sydney Opera House with The Paris Company & STC
1979	Long Day's Journey into Night	James Tyrone	Sydney Opera House with STC
1979	Last Day in Woolloomooloo	Ted	Playhouse, Adelaide with STCSA
1980	The Mystery Plays of Wakefield		Playhouse, Adelaide with STCSA
1980	The Three Sisters	Ivan Chevutykin	Playhouse, Adelaide with STCSA
1980	The Float	Ruff Mottram	Playhouse, Adelaide with STCSA
1980	The Precious Woman	Chi Yu	Sydney Opera House with STC
1981	A Hard God	Martin	Playhouse, Adelaide with STCSA
1981	The Revenger's Tragedy	Antonio / Dondolo	Playhouse, Adelaide with STCSA
1986	The Nerd	Clelia	Comedy Theatre, Melbourne, University of Sydney, Regal Theatre, Perth, Playhouse, Adelaide
1989	Macbeth	Duncan, King of Scotland	Playhouse, Melbourne with MTC
1989	Dreams in an Empty City	Wilson	Playhouse, Melbourne with MTC
1990–1991	Lend Me a Tenor	Saunders / Maggie's father / General Manager of the Cleveland Grand Opera Company	His Majesty's Theatre, Perth, Theatre Royal Sydney, Lyric Theatre, Brisbane, Canberra Theatre
1991	The Crucible	Deputy Governor Danforth	Playhouse, Melbourne with MTC
1991	Uncle Vanya	Serebryakov	Russell Street Theatre, Melbourne with MTC
1994	High Society	Seth Lord	Playhouse, Adelaide, Playhouse, Melbourne, Suncorp Theatre, Brisbane, Canberra Theatre, His Majesty's Theatre, Perth, Her Majesty's Theatre, Adelaide, Comedy Theatre, Melbourne, State Theatre, Sydney with MTC

== Sources ==
- "Dynasty Eps".
- "1984 :: TV WEEK". Archived from the original on 3 March 2017.
