= Jeanie Drynan =

Australian actress

- Born: Jean Julia Drynan; 5 May 1947 (age 79)
- Education: Edinburgh College of Speech and Drama; National Institute of Dramatic Art
- Occupation: Actress
- Years active: 1961–present
- Known for: Muriel's Wedding; Prisoner
- Spouse: Antony Bowman (m. 1989)
- Children: 1

Jean Julia "Jeanie" Drynan (5 May 1947) is an Australian actress well known for her roles in the television series Class of '74, as Muriel's mother in the 1994 film Muriel's Wedding and as solicitor Angela Jeffries in the cult classic television series Prisoner Cell Block H.

== Early life ==
Jean Julia Drynan was born in 1947 to parents James Joseph and Muriel Drynan. She grew up in the regional NSW towns of Lithgow and Coffs Harbour. She moved to the UK at the age of 15 with the intention of going to finishing school and instead studied acting at Edinburgh College of Speech and Drama (which was later absorbed into Queen Margaret University) in Scotland. She later trained at the National Institute of Dramatic Art (NIDA) in Australia, graduating with a Diploma of Dramatic Art in 1961.

== Career ==
Drynan started out in guest roles in numerous Australian television series including Hunter, Skippy, Riptide, The Rovers, Division 4, The Link Men, Delta, Matlock Police, Spyforce, Boney, Homicide and Ryan. She also had early roles in 1966 comedy film They’re a Weird Mob, and 1967 television play The Schoolmistress.

She then starred in high school-based soap opera Class of ‘74 as English teacher Mary Dunstan, and 1976 political-themed film Don’s Party (based on the play of the same name by David Williamson) as Kath Henderson. Further guest roles followed in Bluey, The Young Doctors and Chopper Squad, before she secured the part of solicitor, Angela Jeffries in cult classic television drama Prisoner in 1979, endearing her to international viewers.

Further guest roles followed, in series such as Cop Shop, A Country Practice, The Flying Doctors, Rafferty's Rules, The Girl from Tomorrow and G.P. before she landed her best-known role as the ill-fated Betty Heslop, mother of the title character in 1994 hit film Muriel's Wedding, alongside Toni Collette, Rachel Griffiths and Bill Hunter.

She starred in numerous other films including the 1999 romantic comedy Paperback Hero (as Suzie, opposite Hugh Jackman), drama film A Kind of Hush (as Beryl) and comedy/drama Soft Fruit (in the lead role of Patsy), before appearing as Vanessa in 6 episodes of comedy series Dossa and Joe (2002) and Leanne in 4 episodes of The Cooks (2003–2005).

Drynan has been nominated three times for Australian Film Institute Awards – Best Supporting Actress in 1977 for Don’s Party, Best Supporting Actress in 1994 for Muriel's Wedding and Best Actress in 1999 for Soft Fruit.

== Personal life ==
Drynan met her husband, director Antony Bowman, in 1979, when she played the part of Maggie in his film Cappuccino. She also appeared in his film Relatives (1985) and Paperback Hero (1999).

In 1990, Drynan moved from Sydney to Los Angeles with Bowman and their daughter, actress Ella Bowman-Gibson, to further Bowman's directing career.

== Filmography ==
=== Film ===
Title	Year	Role	Type
1966	They're a Weird Mob	Betty	Feature film
1967	The Schoolmistress		Teleplay
1969	2000 Weeks	Jacky Lewis	Feature film
1969	Skippy and the Intruders	Margaret 'Meg' Curtis	Feature film
1970	Single File		Film documentary short
1973	The Black Arrow	Voice	Animated TV movie
1973	The Swiss Family Robinson	Voice	Animated TV movie
1976	Don's Party	Kath Henderson	Feature film
1976	Cromwell M.D.		TV movie
1976	The Understudy		TV movie
1977	The Picture Show Man	Mrs. Duncan	Feature film
1977	Hospitals Don't Burn Down!	Sister	Film short
1978	Money Movers	Dawn Jackson	Feature film
1979	Saint Therese	Therese	Film short
1980	Touch and Go	Gina	Feature film
1982	Wilde's Domain	Liz	TV movie
1983	The Body Corporate	Janine Fox	TV movie
1984	Fantasy Man	Liz Bailey	Feature film
1985	Relatives	Catherine Taylor	Feature film
1989	Cappuccino	Maggie	Feature film. Also associate producer
1994	Muriel's Wedding	Betty Heslop	Feature film
1998	Paperback Hero	Suzie	Feature film
1999	A Kind of Hush	Beryl	Feature film
1999	Soft Fruit	Patsy Haft	Feature film
2002	The...		Film short
2015	Skin Deep	Anna Davies	Feature film
2017	Zelos	Lynn	Feature film
TBA	Arrivederci	Izzy	Feature film In development

=== Television ===
Year	Title	Role	Type
1965	Adventure Unlimited		TV series, episode 7: "The Silver Backed Brushes"
1965	My Brother Jack		TV series
1966-1973	Homicide	Sandra O'Brien / Pauline Shearer / Glenys Watts	TV series, 3 episodes
1966	The Story of Making the Film: They're a Weird Mob"	Herself	TV special
1968	Hunter	Anna Polanski	TV series, 1 episode
1968; 1969	Skippy the Bush Kangaroo	Iris Temple / Dulcie Condon	TV series, 2 episodes
1969–1974	Division 4	Paula Klein / Sally Irving / Cindy Thompson / Lettie Ward / Barbara Bennett / Meg Reagan / Sandra Black / Vivienne Gunnerson / Faith Cameron / Patti Regan	TV series, 10 episodes
1968; 1969	Riptide	Val Wells / Penny Waring	TV series, 2 episodes
1969	Pastures of the Blue Crane	Amaryllis 'Rhyll' Mereweather	TV miniseries
1970	The Rovers	Ann Fraser	TV series, 1 episode
1970	The Link Men	Marguerita Costello	TV series, 1 episode 10: "The Quiet One"
1970	Delta	Jennifer McKenzie	TV series, 1 episode
1971–1972	Matlock Police	Alice Price / Carol Marsh / Gail Marsh	TV series, 3 episodes
1972	Spyforce	Kathy Reilly	TV series, 1 episode
1972–1973	Boney	Sally Forrest / Isobel Matthews	TV series, 2 episodes
1973	Ryan	Tricia	TV series, 1 episode
1973	Elephant Boy	Jane Shorter	TV series, 1 episode
1974	Class of '74	Mary Dunstan	TV series, 2 episodes
1975	Silent Number	Denise	TV series, 1 episode
1976	Bluey	Shirley Watson	TV series, 1 episode: "The Changeling"
1977	The Young Doctors	Sister Margaret Evans	TV series, 15 episodes
1978	Cop Shop	Dimitra Coogan / Vanessa Montgomery	TV series, 4 episodes
1978	Chopper Squad	Dr Georgia Beattie	TV series, 13 episodes
1979–1980	Prisoner	Angela Jeffries	TV series, 11 episodes
1981	Holiday Island	Julie-Anne Tucker	TV series, 1 episode
1982	A Country Practice	Audrey Matthews	TV series, 2 episodes
1985	Winners		TV series, Season 1, episode 2: "Quest Beyond Time"
1987	The Flying Doctors	Sal Cleary	TV series, 1 episode
1989	Rafferty's Rules	Carol Taylor	TV series, 1 episode
1991	The Girl From Tomorrow	Miss Durkin	TV series, 2 episodes
1995	G.P.	Hannah Hardigan	TV series, 1 episode
1996	A Season in Purgatory		TV miniseries
2002	Dossa and Joe	Vanessa	TV miniseries, 6 episodes
2004–2005	The Cooks	Leanne Smith	TV series, 4 episodes
2010	Rake	Carmen	TV series, 1 episode

== Stage ==
=== As actor ===
Year	Title	Role	Notes
	The Importance of Being Earnest		Theatre Royal Sydney
1961	Peer Gynt		NIDA, Sydney
1963	The Playboy of the Western World		UNSW Old Tote Theatre, Sydney
1967	The Schoolmistress		UNSW Old Tote Theatre, Sydney
1967	The School for Scandal		UNSW Old Tote Theatre, Sydney
1967	Hedda Gabler		UNSW Old Tote Theatre, Sydney
1970	The One Day of the Year		Independent Theatre Sydney, Playhouse, Canberra
1971	Big Brother Dragon		Independent Theatre, Sydney
1971	There Is Nothing More Wonderful than a Glorious Sunset		Independent Theatre, Sydney
1973	A Voyage Round My Father	Elizabeth	Comedy Theatre, Melbourne, UNSW, Sydney with J. C. Williamson's
1977	Boeing, Boeing		J. C. Williamson's
1979	Makassar Reef	Beth Fleetwood	Nimrod Theatre Company, Sydney
1985	Same Time, Next Year	Doris	Playhouse, Newcastle with Hunter Valley Theatre Company
1986	Gulls		Belvoir Street Theatre, Sydney with HMQ Productions
1992	Men Should Weep		Independent Theatre, Sydney
2010	Bedroom Farce	Delia	Darlinghurst Theatre, Sydney
2011	Nothing Personal	Carla	Ensemble Theatre, Sydney
2012	Biddies		

=== As director ===
Year	Title	Role	Notes
2014	Somewhere…	Director	Meta Theatre, Los Angeles

== Awards and nominations ==
Year	Work	Award	Category	Result
1977	Don’s Party	Australian Film Institute Awards	Best Actress in a Lead Role	Nominated
1994	Muriel's Wedding	Australian Film Institute Awards	Best Actress in a Supporting Role	Nominated
1999	Soft Fruit	Australian Film Institute Awards	Best Actress in a Leading Role	Nominated
2000	Soft Fruit	Film Critics Circle of Australia Awards	Best Actor – Female	Nominated
