= Sally Tayler =

Australian actress

- Born: Australia
- Occupation: Actress
- Years active: 1970–1987
- Known for: The Young Doctors; Waterloo Station; Minder; Sons and Daughters
- Parent: Eric Tayler (father) Lyn James (mother)

Sally Tayler is an Australian actress known for several roles in Australian soap operas.

== Biography ==
She played the key role of Dr. Vicki Daniels in The Young Doctors in 1982–83. After that series ended she starred in the short-lived soap opera Waterloo Station (1983). She starred in 1984's Super Sleuth and in 1985 she played Samantha Morrell in Sons and Daughters. In 1986 she played a lead in the pilot of Shark's Paradise.

In the early 1980s she travelled to the United Kingdom to work, scoring a guest role playing Lisa, an Australian shop-lifter, in an episode of Minder along with former "Young Doctors" and Waterloo Station co-star, Julianne White.

She is the daughter of The Young Doctors actress Lyn James, who played Helen Gordon in the show, and the New Zealand-born producer and director, Eric Tayler.

== Filmography ==
=== Film ===
Year	Title	Role	Type
1987	Les Patterson Saves the World	Rhonda	Feature film

=== Television ===
Year	Title	Role	Type
1982	The Young Doctors	Recurring role: Vicki Daniels	TV series, 74 episodes
1983	Minder	Guest role: Lisa	TV series UK, 1 episode
1983	MPSIB	Guest role	TV series, 1 episode
1983–1984	Waterloo Station	Regular role: Sally Edwards	TV series, 40 episodes
1984	Special Squad	Guest role	TV series, 1 episode
1984	Super Sleuth	Recurring role: Sarah Clarke	TV movie
1985–1986	Sons and Daughters	Regular role: Samantha Morrell (as Sally Taylor)	TV series, 148 episodes
1986	Shark's Paradise	Lead role: Billie Riley	TV movie
