= The Schoolmistress (Wednesday Theatre) =

- Wednesday Theatre episode
- Episode no.: Season 3 Episode 11
- Directed by: John Croyston
- Based on: The Schoolmistress by Arthur Wing Pinero
- Original air date: 15 March 1967
- Running time: 90 minutes

Episode chronology
← Previous "Dan, Dan the Charity Man"	Next → "The Cure for Love"

"The Schoolmistress" is a 1967 Australian TV play based on The Schoolmistress by Arthur Wing Pinero. John Croyston directed based on a stage play presented by Alexander Hay. It aired as part of Wednesday Theatre.

== Plot ==
At a girls school one of the girls is secretly married to a young man her parents have forbidden her to see.

== Cast ==
- David Copping
- Kirrily Nolan
- Jeanie Drynan
- Judith Fisher as Peggy Hesslrigge
- Jacki Weaver
- Clarissa Kaye-Mason
- Frank Lloyd
- Alan Edwards
- Marion Johns
- Owen Weingott as Admiral Ranking

== Production ==
It was a TV version of a production of the play that was then running at the Old Tote.

== Reception ==
The Sydney Morning Herald to put the play "into the telly machine is like asking a Ford Mustang to run on oats" but admitted "_Croyston's lighting and camera movements show detailed thought and are worked to effect. He cannot help losing colour or the third dimension, but he has kept the essential frothiness and has puffed it further with cleverly caught close-ups and so on" but that "the 90 minutes of TV seem to take longer than the 140 minutes of theatre."

The Sunday Sydney Morning Herald called it "a most enjoyable affair... the whole enterprise was one of ABN-2's more successful experiments."
