= Frank and Francesca =

- Genre: Children's television
- Based on: Frank and Francesca by David Martin
- Written by: Oriel Gray
- Directed by: Rick Birch; Douglas Sharp
- Country of origin: Australia
- No. of seasons: 1
- No. of episodes: 6

Production
- Producer: Oscar Whitbread
- Running time: 30 minutes

Original release
- Network: ABC
- Release: 29 July – 2 September 1973

Frank and Francesca is an Australian children's television series which first screened on the ABC in 1973.

The series of six 30 minute black & white episodes were based on the book of the same name by David Martin (1915-1997) which was published in 1972. It was produced by Oscar Whitbread for the Australian Broadcasting Commission and was directed by Rick Birch and Douglas Sharp.

== Premise ==
An old vendetta between two Sicilian families reignites when they emigrate to Australia.

== Cast ==
- Allan Wilson as Frank
- Lenice Reed as Francesca
- Gus Mercurio
- June Hamilton
- Chris Haywood as Monty
- Peter Cummins
- Denny Lawrence
- Pauline Charleston
- Alan Wilson
- Lolita Toppano
- John Frawley
- Margaret Christensen

== See also ==
- List of Australian television series
