= Oscar Whitbread =

Australian producer (1929–2016)

Oscar Whitbread OAM
- Born: Oscar Ralph Whitbread; 26 November 1929; England, United Kingdom
- Died: 16 May 2016 (aged 86)
- Citizenship: English Australia
- Occupations: Film and television producer/director
- Years active: 1956-1997
- Known for: Head of Drama at the ABC, Head of Drama at the Seven Network
- Spouse: Corrine Kerby

Oscar Ralph Whitbread (26 November 1929 – 16 May 2016) was an English-Australian pioneering producer and director who worked extensively in television and film.

== Biography ==
Whitbread who was born in the United Kingdom, moved to Australia in the late 1940s. and started his career with the inception of television in that country in 1956, firstly at the ABC, where he served as the Head of Drama, before switching to the same position with the Seven Network.

He was responsible for numerous successful series including Bellbird, The Flying Doctors and the miniseries Power Without Glory. Whitbread was the senior executive producer at Crawford Productions and also worked in England for the BBC, Thames Television, Granada Television, and London Weekend Television. During the 1970s, he worked as a theatre media studies lecturer, at Charles Sturt University, Bathurst, New South Wales.

== Personal life ==
Whitbread was married to Corinne Kerby. He died on 16 May 2016 after a long illness.

== Select credits ==
- Ice Circus (1963) (ice skating TV special)
- Beauty and the Beast (1964) (ice skating TV special)
- On Approval (1964) (TV movie) – producer
- Corruption in the Palace of Justice (1964) (TV movie) – producer
- The Winds of Green Monday (1965) (TV movie) – producer, director
- Otherwise Engaged (1965) (TV movie) – producer
- Duet on Wednesday (1965) (television play) – producer
- Photo Finish (1965) (TV movie) – producer
- Plain Jane (1966) (TV movie) – producer
- Slow Poison (1967) (TV movie) – producer
- Love and War (1967) (TV movie) – producer
- The Shifting Heart (1968) (TV movie) – producer
- Delta (Australian TV series) (1969) (TV series) – director
- Dynasty (1969) (TV series) – director
- Bellbird (1970–77) (TV series) – producer
- A Family at War (1970) (TV series) – director
- The Man Who Shot the Albatross (1972) (TV movie)
- Frank and Francesca (1973) (TV series)
- Marion (1974) (miniseries) – producer, director
- And the Big Men Fly (1974) (TV series) – producer
- Rush (1975) (TV series) – producer, director
- The Professional Touch (1976) (television play)
- Trial of Ned Kelly (1977) (TV movie)
- Power Without Glory (1976) (mini series) – producer
- Catspaw (1978) (TV series)
- The Truckies (1978) (TV series)
- Burn the Butterflies (1979) (TV movie)
- A Wild Ass of a Man (1980) (TV movie)
- Lucinda Brayford (1980) (mini series)
- I Can Jump Puddles (1980)
- Locusts and Wild Honey (1980) (TV series)
- All the Green Year (1981) (mini series)
- Outbreak of Love (1981) (mini series) – producer, director
- The Young Wife (1984) (mini series) – producer, director
- Golden Pennies (1985) (mini series) – producer, director
- The Flying Doctors (1985) (mini series) – producer
- The Flying Doctors (1986) (TV series) – producer, director
- Studio 86 (1986) (TV series) – producer, director
- Acropolis Now (1989) (TV series) – producer
- The Power, The Passion (1989) (TV series) – producer
- Ratbag Hero (1991) (mini series) – producer, director
- Cluedo (1990–92) (TV series) – producer, director
- Bush Patrol (1996) (TV series) – producer
- The Balanced Particle Freeway (1997) (TV movie) – producer
