= Corruption in the Palace of Justice =

- Based on: stage play by Ugo Betti
- Written by: Robert Rietti
- Directed by: Oscar Whitbread
- Country of origin: Australia
- Original language: English

Production
- Running time: 60 mins
- Production company: ABC

Original release
- Network: ABC
- Release: 28 October 1964 (Melbourne)
- Release: 11 November 1964 (Sydney)
- Release: 9 December 1964 (Brisbane)

Corruption in the Palace of Justice is a 1964 Australian television film produced by Oscar Whitbread. Based on an Italian stage play by Ugo Betti, it was a drama aired in a 60-minute time-slot and aired on the non-commercial broadcaster the Australian Broadcasting Commission. The cast included Michael Duffield, Carl Bleazby and Terry Norris. It was produced in Melbourne. It was adapted by Robert Rietti. A copy of the script is at the NAA.

It was set in a nameless country.

== Plot ==
A court of justice in a nameless city and country is being investigated. A judge has made himself the accomplice of an underworld victim and this judge infect the whole process of justice. Judge Cust steers suspicion on to President Vanan, the ageing chief of the court, who is innocent.

== Cast ==
- Terry Norris as Judge Cust
- Michael Duffield as Chief Judge Cross
- Wynn Roberts as Counsellor Enzi
- Carl Bleazby as President Vanan
- Fay Kelton as Elena
- George Whaley
- Kendrick Hudson
- Sydney Conabere
- Bruce Barry
- Horst Bergfried
- Bill Bennett
- Marion Edward

== Production ==
It was shot at ABC Studios in Ripponlea, Melbourne. It was designed by Gunars Jurgana.

== Reception ==
The Sydney Morning Herald called it "the most thought-provoking hour of TV theatre seen for some time", said "the acting was uniformly good" and that "the coldly aseptic geometry of the set emphasised the contrast of impersonal outwardness to the intense inward turmoil".

The Canberra Times said the play "was most valuable as a showcase for the talents of Terry Norris" but felt "the other side of the coin was the thoroughly wasted talent of actors like Wynn Roberts and Michael Duffield."

== See also ==
- Smiling Maniacs (1975)
