= The Power, The Passion =

Television series

- Genre: Soap opera
- Created by: Bevan Lee
- Composer: Mike Perjanik
- Country of origin: Australia
- Original language: English
- No. of seasons: 1
- No. of episodes: 168

Production
- Executive producer: Des Monaghan
- Producer: Oscar Whitbread

Original release
- Network: Seven Network
- Release: 20 March 1989 – 1 February 1990

The Power, The Passion is an Australian television daytime soap opera produced by the Seven Network in 1989.

The series was devised to compete with American shows such as The Bold and the Beautiful and The Young and the Restless but failed to make an impact and was cancelled due to low ratings after 168 episodes.

== Production ==
In April 1988, David Brown of TV Week reported that Seven Network (then Australian Television Network) was putting a new half-hour daytime drama serial into production. The show, originally titled Love, Passion And Desire, was set to air five days a week in the 12–1:30pm timeslot. It was to be Seven's answer to the American soaps that had dominated the Australian daytime schedule. It was also the first local daytime soap produced in 20 years for the Seven Network. They had previously tried four times to make the genre work for them with Autumn Affair, The Story of Peter Grey, Until Tomorrow, and Motel, which had been Seven's last local daytime soap. Love, Passion And Desire was produced by the Seven Network Drama Unit, which was also responsible for Home and Away and Rafferty's Rules. Head of the drama unit, Alan Bateman became the executive producer, and he told Brown that he had always wanted to do an Australian daytime soap. He stated: "You can have a lot of fun with a daytime soap. It will be part of a whole programming strategy. It will principally be the lead-in to the daytime schedule."

Brown reported that the new soap would follow a rich and powerful family whose patriarch is "not the most pristine character in the world." He has three daughters, who have vastly different backgrounds. Bateman explained that the show would include "all those wonderful daytime soap characters", many young people and professional actors. He added that Love, Passion And Desire would contain many daytime soap tropes, including love, hate, unrequited love, deception and blackmail. The name of the soap was eventually changed to The Power, The Passion. Filming for its first five episodes took place at Seven's Melbourne studios in September 1988. The Power, The Passion received enthusiastic reception from the network's board members. It was scheduled to air five times a week opposite Nine Network's Midday Show in a 1 pm time slot, following The Bert Newton Show.

The Power, The Passion focuses on wealthy businessman Gordon Byrne played by Kevin Miles, who returns to Australia after a five year absence. Gordon has three daughters who dislike him and he is "desperate" for a son and heir. His daughters are the glamorous Anna Wright played by Suzy Cato, psychiatrist Kathryn Byrne played by Tracey Tainsh, and middle-class Ellen Edmonds played by Olivia Hamnett. Other cast members included Danny Roberts and Ian Rawlings, who plays "nice guy" Ryan. Julian McMahon made his Australian television debut in the show, having previously worked as a model.

== Cast ==
- Kevin Miles – Gordon Byrne
- Jill Forster – Sarah McAllister
- Ian Rawlings – Ryan McAllister
- Tracy Tainsh – Kathryn Byrne
- Suzy Cato – Anna Wright
- George Mallaby – Justin Wright
- Danny Roberts – Samuel Wright
- Libby Purvis – Rebecca Wright
- Olivia Hamnett – Ellen Edmonds
- Alan Cassell – Dr. Andrew Edmonds
- Julian McMahon – Kane Edmonds
- Neil Grant – Adam Edmonds
- Lucinda Cowden – Danni Edmonds
- Susan Ellis – Talia Edmonds
- Jacqui Gordon – Susan Walsh
- Nick Carrafa – Nick Casalla
- Ross Thompson – Thomas
- Jane Clifton – Carla Graham
- Chelsea Brown - Chanteuse
- Jon Finlayson – William Somerset
- John Higginson – Sonni Davis
- Gerard Maguire – David
- Joe Spano – Steven

At one point the program included a gay male character, Steven (Joe Spano). The character was killed off after a few months.
