= Relatives (1985 film) =

- Directed by: Anthony Bowman
- Written by: Anthony Bowman
- Produced by: Henri Safran; Basil Appleby
- Starring: Jeanie Drynan; Bill Kerr; Ray Barrett; Rowena Wallace; Norman Kaye; Alyson Best; Brett Climo; Michael Aitkens
- Production company: Archer Films
- Release date: 1985
- Running time: 84 minutes
- Country: Australia
- Language: English

Relatives is a 1985 Australian film about a family reunion.

== Premise ==
A family reunion is being held at a rural property, Pinefall.

== Cast ==
- Jeanie Drynan as Catherine Taylor
- Bill Kerr as Grandpa, Geoffrey's father
- Ray Barrett as Geoffrey Southerly
- Carol Raye as Aunty Joan
- Rowena Wallace as Nancy Peterson
- Norman Kaye as Uncle Edward
- Alyson Best as Clare Southerly, Geoffrey's daughter
- Brett Climo as Ross
- Michael Aitkens as Peter Peterson, Nancy's husband
- Rebekah Elmaloglou as Rebecca Peterson
- Ray Meagher as Herb Taylor

== Reception ==
The Sydney Morning Herald called it "an entertaining and diverting piece of teledrama."
