= Ian Warburton =

English footballer

Personal information
- Full name: Ian Thomas Warburton
- Date of birth: 22 March 1952
- Place of birth: Haslingden, England
- Date of death: February 2021 (aged 68)
- Position: Striker

Senior career*
Years	Team	Apps	(Gls)
- Haslingden St James
- Haslingden
1972–1974	Bury	6	(2)
1974–1975	Southport	7	(1)
- Mossley
- Rossendale United
- Accrington Stanley
- Nelson
- Haslingden St Mary's
- Rising Bridge
Total		13+	(3+)
- * Club domestic league appearances and goals

Ian Thomas Warburton (22 March 1952 – February 2021) was an English professional footballer who played as a striker, primarily for Bury and Southport in the lower tiers of the Football League in the 1970s.

== Career ==
Born in Haslingden, Lancashire, Warburton began his career in local non-league football with Haslingden St James and Haslingden, before turning professional, making 6 league appearances and scoring 2 goals for Bury from 1972 to 1974 (including as part of their Division Four promotion-winning squad in 1973–74), followed by a spell at Southport where he made 7 league appearances and scored 1 goal in 1974–1975.

Following his professional career, Warburton continued playing for non-league clubs including Mossley, Rossendale United, Accrington Stanley, Nelson, Haslingden St Mary's and Rising Bridge.

== Later life ==
Warburton later became a mechanical engineer, running his own design company. He died in February 2021.
