= Mismatch (1979 film) =

- Directed by: Ken Hannam
- Written by: Barry Donnelly
- Produced by: Eric Tayler
- Starring: Stephen O'Rourke, Jane Harders
- Release date: 1979
- Running time: 69 minutes
- Country: Australia
- Language: English

Mismatch is a 1979 Australian television film written by Barry Donnelly. It portrays a separated couple who move back in together for their children. It was part of ABC's Season of Australian Plays.

== Cast ==
- Stephen O'Rourke as Richard Harrington
- Jane Harders as Marsha Harrington
- Michael Aitkens as Piggy
- Margo Lee as Molly
- John Bluthal as Molly's husband
- Michael Caulfield as Courtney
- Jennifer Claire as the marriage counsellor
- Alfred Bell as Kelvin Spragg
- Bronwyn Clark
- Nerida Clark

== Reception ==
Writing in the Age Mark Lawrence said it was "A delightful, light-hearted portrayal of a culture clash between husband and wife". The Sydney Morning Herald's Garry Shelley wrote that it was a "light-hearted look at the pitfalls of a marriage on the rocks."
