= Delta (Australian TV series) =

- Genre: drama
- Created by: Colin Free
- Written by: Pat Flowers; Tony Morphett; Colin Free
- Directed by: Tom Jeffrey; Wolfgang Storch; David Goddard
- Starring: John Gregg; Kirrily Nolan; Patsy Trench; Kevin Miles
- Country of origin: Australia
- Original language: English
- No. of episodes: 23

Production
- Producer: David Goddard
- Running time: 60 mins

Original release
- Network: ABC
- Release: 25 September 1969 – 18 September 1970

Delta is a 1969 Australian TV series, produced and broadcast by ABC-TV in 1969–70. The title is the name of the fictional independent research organisation featured in the series, a freelance scientific consultancy which is called in to provide scientific investigators and troubleshooters in a wide range of situations, including pollution, forgery, mining, conservation, and the recovery of a lost satellite.

The series focusses on the exploits of one of Delta's mobile laboratories, and initially featured three lead regular characters, investigative scientist Jeff Mallow (John Gregg), his assistant Inger Petri (Kirrily Nolan) and science specialist Brian Fitch (Kevin Miles). A fourth regular character, scientist Jackie Stuart (Patsy Trench) was added for the second season.

The series was one of the first major in-house productions from the ABC's recently established Drama Unit. It was devised by Colin Free and overseen by ABC Head of Drama David Goddard (father of actress Liza Goddard), who also was producer and occasional co-director for the series.

It broke new ground in Australian TV drama as the first local series to cover topical issues like pollution and conservation from a scientific and investigative viewpoint. The relatively high budget and the wide-ranging premise of the series allowed for extensive use of locations, and the entire series was shot entirely on film – also unusual for the period, since most Australian series at the time were either videotaped in the studio or had an integrated production that combined videotaped interiors and filmed exteriors.

== Cast ==
=== Main ===
- John Gregg as Jeff Mallow
- Kirrily Nolan as Inger Petri
- Kevin Miles as Brian Fitch
- Patsy Trench as Jackie Stuart

=== Guests ===
- [Abigail] as Glenda
- Alister Smart as Paul Falstone-Green (1 episode)
- Ben Gabriel as Lawson (1 episode)
- Carmen Duncan as Diane (1 episode)
- Chips Rafferty as Sawtell (1 episode)
- Dina Mann as Daphne (1 episode)
- Dinah Shearing as Hannah Thompson (1 episode)
- Edward Howell as Lawler (1 episode)
- Elke Neidhart as Claudia (1 episode)
- Enid Lorimer as Hilda (1 episode)
- Harold Hopkins as Alan Tibbett (1 episode)
- James Smillie as Derek (1 episode)
- Jeanie Drynan as Jennifer McKenzie (1 episode)
- John Derum as Staines (1 episode)
- John Meillon as Jim Garrick (1 episode)
- Judy Morris as Girl (1 episode)
- Lyndall Barbour as Maria (1 episode)
- Lyndel Rowe as Jenny (1 episode)
- Max Phipps as Tony Spencer (1 episode)
- Michael Pate as Leo Falstone-Green (1 episode)
- Moya O'Sullivan as Margaret (1 episode)
- Nigel Lovell as Major Brunning / Ronnie (2 episodes)
- Owen Weingott as McCrainor (1 episode)
- Peter Collingwood as Peter Carpenter (1 episode)
- Peter Gwynne as Len Reeves / Wilson (2 episodes)
- Peter Sumner as Bill Kegan / Dr Brian Dawe (2 episodes)
- Reg Livermore as Saxon (1 episode)
- Richard Meikle as Bill Prescott (1 episode)
- Steve Dodd as Buck / Melodie (2 episodes)
- Stewart Ginn as Rankin (1 episode)
- Wynn Roberts as Rand / Janosek (2 episodes)

== Episodes ==
(Dates are the first air date)

=== Series 1 ===
1. The Devil Take the Bluetongue Fly (25 Sept 1969) - w Colin Free d Brian Faull
2. Stresspoint (2 Oct 1969) - w Colin Free d Wolfgang Storch
3. Wish Upon a Fallen Star (9 Oct 1969) - w Colin Free
4. A Pocketful of Bones (16 Oct 1969) - w Colin Free
5. Welcome To Sunhaven (23 Oct 1969) - w Colin Free d Wolfgang Storch
6. The Trouble with Daisy (30 Oct 1969) - w Colin Free
7. There's a Lot of It About (6 Nov 1969) - w Colin Free
8. The Initiates (13 Nov 1969) -w Tony Morphett. GS Tristran Rogers, Frank Thring
9. Delicate Balance (20 Nov 1969) - w Colin Free d Tom Jeffrey
10. A Beautiful Burn (27 Nov 1969) - w Colin Free d Oscar Whitbread
11. D Is for Destruction (4 Dec 1969) - w John Kiddell d Tom Jeffrey
12. R.I.P. (11 Dec 1969) - d David Goddard. GS Chips Rafferty. First episode with Patsy Trench

=== Series 2 ===
1. The Short Sell (10 Jul 1970) - w Martin Stormill d Wolfgang Storch. GS John Meillon, Ron Randell
2. Look Thy Last (17 Jul 1970) - w John Martin d Tom Jeffrey
3. The Fatted Calf (24 Jul 1970) - d David Goddard. GS Michael Pate.
4. Hannah (31 Jul 1970)
5. Death Walk (7 Aug 1970) - w Robert Peach d Wolfgang Storch
6. A Bite of History (14 Aug 1970) - d Frank Arnold
7. A Touch of DFP (21 Aug 1970) - w Tony Morphett
8. The Honeywind Blows (28 Aug 1970)- d Frank Arnold
9. Blackout (4 Sept 1970) - w John Martin d Tom Jeffrey script ed Barbara Vernon
10. Too Many Masters (11 Sept 1970) - d Frank Arnold
11. Overkill (18 Sept 1970) - w Colin Free
