= Lyn James =

Welsh actress (1929–2017)

- Lyn James as Helen Gordon in The Young Doctors
- Born: Margaret James; 13 November 1929; Rhondda, Wales, United Kingdom
- Died: 31 May 2017 (aged 87); Sydney, Australia
- Education: Royal Academy of Dramatic Art
- Occupations: Stage and screen actress; director
- Years active: 1949–2002
- Spouse: Eric Tayler (19??-1997)
- Children: 2 including Sally Tayler, actress

Lyn James (13 November 1929 – 31 May 2017), credited also as Marilyn James, was a Welsh-born actress of stage and screen and director, who became known for her career in England and later Australia, particularly as receptionist Helen Gordon in television soap opera The Young Doctors

== Biography ==
She was born Margaret James, the daughter of theatre actor and producer Jack James and granddaughter of photographer Levi Ladd. and grew up in Rhondda in South Wales. After graduating from RADA, James made her professional debut as an actress in 1949, appearing in numerous plays and TV serials in England for the BBC. After meeting her husband they emigrated to Australia in 1965, and, credited now as "Lyn James", appeared in numerous Crawford Productions series, before she became best known internationally for her role as doctors secretary Helen Gordon in the Australian television soap opera The Young Doctors. She appeared in the series from its inception in 1976, until it ended in 1983, one of only a few actors to appear for the duration of the series.

== Filmography ==
TELEVISION

Year	Title	Role	Type
1955	Fantastic Summer	Nan Wilde (as Marilyn James)	TV film, UK
1955	Misery Me	Romilda (as Marilyn James)	TV film, UK
1956	Jinny Morgan	Aggie Hughes (as Marilyn James)	Teleplay, UK
1956	Poison Pen	Rose Rainrider (as Marilyn James)	Teleplay, UK
1957	The Druid Circle	Megan Lewis (as Marilyn James)	Teleplay, UK
1957	Precious Bane	Guest role: Moll Miller (as Marilyn James)	TV series UK, 2 episodes
1957	The Stolen Miniatures	Nurse Dawson (as Marilyn James)	TV film, UK
1957	To Love And To Cherish	Prudence (as Marilyn James)	Teleplay, UK
1957	Nicholas Nickleby	Recurring role: Madeline Bray (as Marilyn James)	TV series UK, 4 episodes
1963	One About The Lugger...	Guest role: Meg Barker (as Marilyn James)	TV series UK, 1 episode
1963	24-Hour Call	Guest role: Mary Johnson (as Marilyn James)	TV series UK, 1 episode
1963	First Night	Guest role: Alice Potter (as Marilyn James)	TV series UK, 1 episode
1963	Emergency-Ward 10	Recurring role: Beryl Denbigh (as Marilyn James)	TV series UK, 5 episodes
1965	Story Parade	Guest role: Alice Dawes (as Marilyn James)	TV series UK, 1 episode
1966	Australian Playhouse	Guest role	ABC TV series, 1 episode
1968	Contrabandits	Guest role: Nan Hallam	TV series, 2 episodes
1969	Hunter	Guest role: Helen Kramer	TV series, 1 episode
1969;1973	Division 4	Guest roles: Mrs. Thompson / Sue Nichols	TV series, 2 episodes
1970	Eden House	Honor	ABC Teleplay
1970–1971	Dynasty	Regular role: Maggie Tench	ABC TV series, 22 episodes
1972	Catwalk	Guest role: Julia Battle	TV series, 1 episode
1972	Matlock Police	Guest role: Joan Price	TV series, 1 episode
1972	Over There	Recurring role	TV series, 3 episodes
1973	Boney	Guest role	TV series, 1 episode
1973	Catch Kandy	Recurring role: Mrs. Wayne	TV series, 3 episodes
1973	Ryan	Guest role: Margaret Nelson	TV series, 1 episode
1973	The Evil Touch	Guest role: Maid	TV series, 1 episode
1975	Silent Number	Guest role	TV series, 1 episode
1975	Armchair Cinema	Guest Doris	TV series, 1 episode "Tully"
1976	The Emigrants	Guest role: Mrs. Lewis	TV series UK, 1 episode
1976–1982	The Young Doctors	Regular role: Helen Gordon	TV series, 313 episodes
1978	Case for the Defence	Guest role: Minna McGee	TV series, 1 episode 2: "The Killing Of Toby McGee"
1979	The Rock Pool	Role unknown	ABC Teleplay
1980	Telethon '80	Herself	TV special
1983	The Coral Island	Guest role: Lady Rover	TV miniseries, 1 episode
1987	Olive	Recurring role: Doreen	ABC TV film
1991	In Sydney Today	Herself – Guest	TV series, 1 episode
1992	Bony	Guest role: Mrs. Vincetti	TV series, 1 episode 2: "Looks Can Kill"
1994	TVTV	Herself with The Young Doctors cast	ABC TV series, 1 episode
1996	40 Years Of TV Stars... Then And Now	Herself	TV special
1997	Where Are They Now?	Herself	TV series, 1 episode
2002	Young Lions	Guest role: Elderly Woman	TV series, 1 episode

== Personal life ==
James was married to the New Zealand producer Eric Tayler, a fellow RADA graduate, and they had two children, one of whom is the Australia actress Sally Tayler, who also appeared with her in The Young Doctors.

James final screen appearance was in 2002 and she died in Sydney, aged 87, on 31 May 2017.
