= Dynasty (Australian TV series) =

- Series 2 title card (1971)
- Genre: Drama
- Written by: Tony Morphett; John Dingwall
- Directed by: Frank Arnold
- Starring: Pat Bishop; Ben Gabriel; Anne Haddy; Nick Tate
- Theme music composer: Laurie Lewis
- Country of origin: Australia
- Original language: English
- No. of seasons: 2
- No. of episodes: 23

Production
- Running time: 60 mins

Original release
- Network: ABC
- Release: 7 October 1970 – 6 October 1971

Dynasty is an Australian TV series that aired from 7 October 1970 to 6 October 1971, based on the 1967 Tony Morphett novel of the same name which had been previously adapted as a television play.

== 1969 TV play ==
The novel was first adapted as a television play produced by the Australian Broadcasting Commission (ABC), and broadcast in October 1969 as one installment of an anthology series of unrelated plays under the title Australian Plays.

The project was written by Morphett based on his novel, and directed in Melbourne by Oscar Whitbread. Morphett had previously written for Australian Playhouse.

=== Plot ===
Inventor Jim Richards (Terry Norris) seeks financial backing from the Mason Corporation for his new machine. He finds himself in the middle of a power struggle for control of the corporation, including a family dispute. David Mason uses his affair with his sister-in-law Kathy to his advantage.

=== Cast ===
- Terry Norris as Jim Richards
- Brian James as Jack Mason, head of family
- Mark McManus as Peter Mason, a brother
- Ron Graham as John Mason, a brother
- Kevin Miles as David Mason
- Alan Hopgood as Jacob Goldberg
- Anne Haddy as Kathy Mason

=== Reception ===
- The Sydney Morning Herald called the play "the best thing the ABC has done in a long, long time."
- "Dynasty belongs to a handful of programs, all produced by the ABC, which examine media power in Australia and indeed it would be interesting to compare Dynasty with later studies such as The Oracle (1979) and Paper Man (1990)." Moran praised actor John Tate for a "very strong performance".

== TV series ==
Following the success of the TV play, a regular TV series was produced with a largely different cast. Premiering in July 1970, the first series consisted of 10 episodes, and the second and final series consisted of 13 episodes.

=== Plot summary ===
Dynasty follows media mogul Jack Mason and his grasping sons John, David and Peter.

=== Cast ===
- John Tate as Jack Mason (Episodes 1–10)
- Ron Graham as John Mason
- Kevin Miles as David Mason
- Nick Tate as Peter Mason
- Anne Haddy as Kathy Mason, John's wife
- Pat Bishop as Patricia Mason, Peter's wife
- Serge Lazareff as Christopher Mason, John and Kathy's son
- Owen Weingott as Jacob Goldberg
- Ben Gabriel as 'Unk' Martel
- Tony Ward as Nigel Dayton
- Lyn James as Maggie Tench, Jack's secretary
- Kerry McGuire as Franki Halliday
- Tom Oliver as Tom Fenwick

=== Episodes ===
Twenty-three episodes were produced.

==== Season 1 (1970) ====
No. overall	No. in series	Title	Directed by	Written by	Original release date
1	1	"Gran Turismo"	Tom Jeffrey	Tony Morphett	7 October 1970
2	2	"Catwalk"	Unknown	Tony Morphett	14 October 1970
3	3	"Counterpoint"	Frank Arnold	Glyn Davies	21 October 1970
4	4	"Young Jim Westlake"	Tom Jeffrey	Peter Schreck	28 October 1970
5	5	"Cry Me A River"	Unknown	Tony Morphett	4 November 1970
6	6	"Paper Of The People"	Frank Arnold	John Dingwall	11 November 1970
7	7	"Second Pressure"	Eric Tayler	Tony Morphett	18 November 1970
8	8	"The Champion"	Unknown	Tony Morphett	25 November 1970
9	9	"Have You Got The Numbers?"	Brian Bell	Tony Morphett	2 December 1970
10	10	"When All The Bets Were Off"	Frank Arnold	Tony Morphett	9 December 1970

==== Season 2 (1971) ====
No. overall	No. in series	Title	Directed by	Written by	Original release date
11	1	"Dead Man's Chair"	Alan Burke	Tony Morphett	14 July 1971
12	2	"The Killing Ground"	Eric Tayler	Tony Morphett	21 July 1971
13	3	"The Coorabungle Deposit"	Unknown	Tony Morphett	28 July 1971
14	4	"Corrida For A Stunt Man"	Frank Arnold	Tony Morphett	4 August 1971
15	5	"Who Wants A Bridge?"	Brian Bell	Pat Flower	11 August 1971
16	6	"Detour To Power"	Frank Arnold	Peter Schreck & Glyn Davies	18 August 1971
17	7	"Nothing Personal"	Alan Burke	Alan Burke	25 August 1971
18	8	"Whatever Happened To Jamie Brooks?"	Brian Bell	Tony Morphett	1 September 1971
19	9	"Two Reds Don't Make A White"	Frank Arnold	Ron Harrison	8 September 1971
20	10	"Countdown"	Frank Arnold	Bob Ellis	15 September 1971
21	11	"Full Circle"	Unknown	Tony Morphett	22 September 1971
22	12	"Man In The Middle"	Unknown	Tony Morphett	29 September 1971
23	13	"A Half Tone Block Is Black And White"	Unknown	Bob Ellis & Ben Blakeney	6 October 1971
