= Ray Barrett =

Australian actor (1927–2009)

- Born: Raymond Charles Barrett; 2 May 1927; Brisbane, Queensland, Australia
- Died: 8 September 2009 (aged 82); Southport, Queensland, Australia
- Education: Brisbane State High School
- Occupation: Actor
- Years active: 1957–2008
- Spouses: Audrey Bettanay (m. 1951, divorced); Miren Cork (m. 1969, divorced); Gaye O'Brien (m. 1986)
- Partner: Celia Sherman
- Children: 3
- Awards: AACTA Award for Best Actor in a Leading Role (1982); Raymond Longford Award (2005)

Raymond Charles Barrett (2 May 1927 – 8 September 2009) was an Australian actor. During the 1960s he was a leading actor on British television, in which he was best known for his appearances in The Troubleshooters (1965–1971). From the 1970s onward he appeared in lead and character roles in Australian films and television series.

== Early life ==
Barrett was born on 2 May 1927 in Brisbane, Queensland and was educated at Windsor State Primary School and at Brisbane State High School. Fascinated by radio from an early age, he won an on-air talent competition in 1939 at the age of 12 for an eisteddfod that was broadcast on 4BH radio, with a musical monologue about a dog called "Paddy". This was to place him on a path different from his dream of becoming a boatbuilder.

In 1949, Barrett was initiated into Freemasonry as an initiate and member of Empire Lodge #197 of the United Grand Lodge of Queensland.

== Acting career ==
Along with Tatjana Hitrina, Rosemary Stevenson and Betty Ross, Barrett was in the play Cockpit. The production, which ran from 18 June to 21 June 1952, was produced by Babette Stephens and ran at the Albert Hall in Brisbane.

=== United Kingdom ===
Ray Barrett first appeared on radio in Brisbane, and later in Sydney, to where he moved in 1954. In 1957, he moved to Britain, where his background as a singer earned him a part in a revue alongside Beryl Reid, Patrick Wymark and Sheila Hancock.

Owing to his supposedly tough look, Barrett was given character and tough guy roles from an unusually young age. In Britain, he played one of the lead roles in the TV series Emergency Ward 10 and later one of the main characters, the hard-nosed oil worker Peter Thornton, in the long-running BBC series The Troubleshooters.

While Barrett mostly appeared in television, he also made several films including Hammer's The Reptile (1966).

He also voiced characters in Gerry Anderson-produced "Supermarionation" series of the 1960s: Stingray (1964–65), as Commander Shore and Titan, and Thunderbirds (1965–66) as John Tracy, the Hood and various extras. Also in 1965, he appeared as Bennett/Koquillion in the Doctor Who serial The Rescue. He also appeared as a bankrupt businessman in a 1972 edition of Public Eye.

=== Australia ===
In later years, Barrett starred in film and TV roles in his native Australia, living on Stradbroke Island, Queensland during the 1970s. He appeared as the Prime Minister (a character who is assassinated) in Burn the Butterflies, and as a miner in Golden Soak. In 1980, he played the part of the controversial Australian historical figure Governor Bligh in the ABC Television production The Timeless Land. He had secondary roles in many other productions, including Something in the Air. He had the "role of a lifetime" as the lead in Goodbye Paradise.

Barrett also appeared in such films as Don's Party and The Carmakers (about the 1973 release of the Leyland P76 car, co-starring Noel Ferrier and Nick Tate). In 2005, he received an Australian Film Institute Longford Life Achievement Award.

== Death ==
Barrett died on 8 September 2009 at the Gold Coast Hospital in Southport, Queensland, aged 82, after suffering a brain haemorrhage. His final acting appearance had been in the 2008 film Australia.

== Filmography ==
=== Film ===
Year	Title	Role	Type
1954	The Desperate Women	Agent	
1960	The Sundowners	Uncredited	
1961	Touch of Death	Maxwell	
1962	Mix Me a Person	Insp. Wagstaffe	
1962	Jigsaw	Sgt. Gorman	
1963	80,000 Suspects	Health Inspector Bennett	
1964	Valley of the Kings	Mr. Marsh	
1966	The Reptile	Harry George Spalding	
1966	Thunderbirds Are Go	John Tracy / The Hood (voice)	
1967	Just Like a Woman	Australian	
1971	Revenge	Harry	
1972	Peer Gynt	Button moulder	
1973	Little Laura and Big John	Cates	
1975	The Amorous Milkman	John	
1975	The Hostages	Joe Blake	
1976	Don's Party	Mal	
1976	Let the Balloon Go	Dr. McLeod	
1978	The Chant of Jimmie Blacksmith	Farrell	
1979	Tim	Man outside hotel (uncredited)	
1980	The Earthling	Parnell	
1982	A Shifting Dreaming		
1982	A Dangerous Summer	F.C.O. Webster	
1983	Goodbye Paradise	Michael Stacy	
1984	Where the Green Ants Dream	Cole	
1985	The Empty Beach	MacLeary	
1985	Rebel	Bubbles	
1985	Relatives	Geoffrey	
1987	Frenchman's Farm	Harry Benson	
1987	Contagion	Bael	
1988	As Time Goes By	J.L. Weston	
1990	Prisoners of the Sun (aka Blood Oath)	President of the Bench	
1991	Waiting	Frank	
1994	No Worries	Old Burkey	
1995	Hotel Sorrento	Wal Moynihan	
1995	Dad and Dave: On Our Selection	Dwyer	
1995	Singapore Sling: Old Flames		
1996	Brilliant Lies	Brian Connor	
1996	Hotel de Love	Jack Dunne	
1997	Heaven's Burning	Cam	
1998	In the Winter Dark	Maurice Stubbs	
2002	Dalkeith	Tarquin St John Smythe	
2003	Visitors	Bill Perry	
2008	Australia	Ramsden (final film role)	

=== Television ===
Year	Title	Role	Type
1957	The Adventures of Long John Silver	Paul	
1959	Educating Archie	Ray	
1960	Armchair Mystery Theatre	Detective-Sergeant Cullen	Anthology series
1960–1961	Emergency Ward 10	Dr. Don Nolan	
1960–1962	Armchair Theatre	Alan Whint / Donnie / Ben	Anthology series
1962	Out of This World	Dr. Alan Whint	
1962	Man of the World	Charlie West	
1962	Scales of Justice: Moment of Decision		Anthology series, episode 3
1962–1963	Edgar Wallace Mysteries	Henry Fraser / Sammy	2 episodes: "Time to Remember", "To Have and to Hold"
1962–1965	Drama 61–67	Captain Murchison	Anthology series
1963	The Avengers	Strong	
1963	Z-Cars	Len Wilson	
1963	ITV Playhouse	Larry Ransome	TV play
1963	First Night	Frank Angelo	
1963–1964	ITV Play of the Week	Sergeant Weston / Jack Bailey	TV play
1963–1964	Ghost Squad	Peter Clarke / Mr. Hicks	
1963–1965	No Hiding Place	Johnny Crown / Larry Hobbs	
1964	The Saint	Willie Kinsall	
1964–1965	The Brothers Karamazov	Mitya Karamazov	
1964–1965	Stingray	Commander Sam Shore / Sub-Lieutenant John Horatio Fisher / King Titan (voice)	
1964–1974	Dixon of Dock Green	Phil Burgh / Nat Singer	
1965	Doctor Who	Bennett / Koquillion	
1965	Thursday Theatre	Jacko	Anthology series
1965	BBC Play of the Month	Knight	Anthology series
1965	Blackmail	Patek	
1965	Gideon C.I.D.		
1965–1966	Thunderbirds	John Tracy / The Hood / Lieutenant Burroughs / Various characters (voice)	
1965–1972	Mogul	Peter Thornton	
1966	The Spies	Walker	
1966	The Man in Room 17	Al Gover	
1967	Till Death Us Do Part	Self	Episode: "Till Closing Time Us Do Part"
1969	The Corbett Follies		
1972	Public Eye	Melville Hayden-Peters	Episode: "The Bankrupt"
1973	Churchill's People	Leo Hennessey	
1974	Barlow at Large	Johnny Duchene	
1974	The Adventures of Black Beauty	T. Otis Waygood	
1974	Colditz	Flt. Lt. Jack Collins	
1974	The Double Dealers	Geoffrey Burch	
1976	Arena	Col Burrows	Miniseries
1976	The Outsiders	Harry	
1976–1977	Moynihan		
1978	Run from the Morning	Detective Sergeant Grogon	Miniseries, 6 episodes
1978	No Room to Run	Jack Deakin	TV movie
1979	Golden Soak	Alec Hamilton	Miniseries
1979	Burn the Butterflies	Prime Minister	TV movie
1980	The Timeless Land	Governor Bligh	Miniseries
1980	Departmental		TV movie
1981	Levkas Man		Miniseries
1981	Sporting Chance	Robbo	
1981	The Last Bastion	Gen. Thomas Blamey	Miniseries
1984	Five Mile Creek	Harry	
1984	Waterfront	Sam Elliott	Miniseries
1984	Conferenceville		TV movie
1986	The Flying Doctors	Frank Watson	
1986	Tusitala	Harry Moors	Miniseries
1986	The Challenge	Robert McCullough	Miniseries
1989	G.P.	Rex Mitchell	2 episodes
1990	The Paper Man	Maurice Grimm	Miniseries
1995	Correlli	Harry Powell	
1995	Bordertown	Colonel Forsythe	Miniseries
1996	Fire	Charles	
1997	Medivac		
2000	Something in the Air	Len Taylor	
2000	Stingers	Mr. Rafferty	
2003	White Collar Blue	Barry Hill	
2003	After the Deluge	Old Cliff Kirby	Miniseries
2004	All Saints	Doc Connelly	1 episode
