= Sally Cooper (actress) =

Australian actress

- Born: Australia
- Occupation: Actress
- Years active: 1978–2010

Sally Cooper is an Australian actress. For her performance in Simone de Beauvoir's Babies she was nominated for the 1997 Australian Film Institute Award for Best Actress in a Leading Role in a Television Drama.

Cooper's career began with the lead role in Gail on ABC TV followed by All the Green Year, Network Ten's Prisoner and an eight-week run on Ten's The Restless Years. Other roles include Moving Out and Simone de Beauvoir's Babies in 1997. She played Maggie Hancock on Neighbours.

Cooper has appeared on stage in plays such as After Dinner for the Melbourne Theatre Company and Goodnight Desdemona (Good Morning Juliet) for State Theatre Company of South Australia.

== Filmography ==
=== Screen ===
- Gail as Lead role
- All the Green Year (TV series) (1980)
- Prisoner (TV series)
- The Restless Years (TV series)
- Moving Out (Film) (1983)
- Simone de Beauvoir's Babies (TV miniseries) (1997)
- Neighbours (TV series) (2001) as Maggie Hancock
- The Forest (Telemovie) (2003)

=== Stage ===
- After Dinner for MTC
- Goodnight Desdemona (Good Morning Juliet) for STCSA
