= Eric Tayler =

New Zealand television director and producer

- Born: Eric Archdale Tayler; 4 December 1921; Hamilton, New Zealand
- Died: 6 August 1997 (aged 75); Sydney, New South Wales, Australia
- Occupations: Television actor, director, producer
- Spouse: Lyn James
- Children: 2 (including Sally Tayler)

Eric Archdale Tayler (4 December 1921 – 6 August 1997) was a New Zealand-born television producer, director and actor, best known for his work for the BBC in the United Kingdom and the ABC in Australia.

== Biography ==
Tayler was born in Hamilton, New Zealand, and educated at Auckland Grammar School. He served in the New Zealand Army during World War II as part of the second New Zealand Expeditionary Force.

In 1947, Tayler moved to London, where he attended the Royal Academy of Dramatic Art (RADA) from 1947 to 1950, which was where he met his wife, Welsh-Australian actress Lyn James, with whom he had two children. In 1955, Tayler joined the drama department of the BBC, working on such programmes as Maigret, Z-Cars and a 1962 adaptation of Oliver Twist. In 1965, Tayler joined the Australian Broadcasting Commission as a producer, where he produced several drama series including Contrabandits.

== Select credits ==
- The Affair (1965)
- The Pigeon (1966)
- Wall to Wall (1966)
- Getting along with the Government (1966)
- Nice n Jucy (1966)
- Contrabandits (1967–68) – won a Penguin for Contrabandits
- Australian Plays (1969–70)
- Dynasty (TV series) (1970–71)
- Dead Men Running (1971) – director, co writer
- The Far Country (1972)
- Over There (1972)
- Certain Women (1973)
- Three Men of the city (1973)
- The Fourth Wish (1975)
- You Just Can't Win (1976)
- Arena (1976)
- The Emigrants (1977)
- A Place in the Word (1978)
- Loss of Innocence (1978) – director
- Bit Part (1978)
- Timelapse (1980)
- Friends of the Family (1980)
- Levkas Man (1981)
- Jonah (1981)
- The Groom's Tale (1981)
- MPSIB (1981)
- Learned Friends (1982)
- City West (1984)
