= Colin Free =

Australian writer (1925–1996)

- Born: 1 September 1925; Sydney, Australia
- Died: 26 May 1996 (aged 70); Melbourne, Victoria, Australia
- Occupations: Screenwriter; playwright; radio writer; novelist; short-story writer

Colin Lewis Free (1 September 1925–26 May 1996) also wrote under pen name Colin Lewis, was an award-winning Australian screenwriter and dramatist, best known for his work on television, but also wrote for radio and theatre, as well as wrote short stories and novels.

== Biography ==
Colin Free was born on 1 September 1925 in Sydney, Australia and died on 26 May 1996 in Goulburn, Australia.

At the start of his career, Free wrote for the theatre, notably Hamlet in Shadow, which was performed in Sydney in 1954 with a cast featuring Moya O'Sullivan.

By the mid-1960s, he concentrated on writing teleplays for the BBC and the ABC, as well as for radio. He was most frequently associated with ABC-TV where he developed the original treatment for the popular soap opera Bellbird, created the adventure series Delta, and served as script editor on the historical miniseries Rush and Ben Hall.

== Assessment ==
Leslie Rees called him:

An author of remarkable facility and flexibility of mind" who in his stage plays "showed a rich gift for words in dramatic and lyrical contiguity, a derisive sense of characterization, a volatile and inventive calling-up of scene both past and present, and what Alexander Archdale described as “‘Pirandellian ingenuity”—all this without quite being able to draw his reins together and spin the horse past the winning-post, meanwhile murmuring in its ear something really striking. Similar qualities of flair, energy, but inadequate clearness of line marked some of Free’s ever-ranging, elusive contributions to a further A.B.C. series, Delta, illustrating the investigations of a young group of itinerant scientists into dubious practices around the countryside. But in the short bucolic comedy, A Walk Among the Wheenies, he was entirely successful.

== Selected awards ==
- Australian Writer's Guild (AWGIE), 1977 - Best TV series episode, Rush (Television) – "A Shilling a Day"
- Logie Award 1977 – Best script – Rush (Television)
- Sammy Award 1977 – Best writer for a television series, Rush (Television)
- Logie Award 1979 – Bit part (Television Drama)
- Logie Award – 1984, 1985, 1986 – A Country Practice (Television)

== Selected credits ==
- How Do You Spell Matrimony? (1965)
- Contrabandits (1967–68)
- Delta (1969)
- The Thursday Creek Mob (1971)
- The End Product (1974)
- Ben Hall (TV series) (1975)
- Rush (1977)
- The Rock Pool (1979)
- Timelapse (1980)
- All the Rivers Run (1983)
- A Walk Among the Wheenies
