= Sammy Awards =

Australian television and film awards

The Sammy Awards were Australian television and film awards held annually between 1976 and 1981, initially supported by the TV Times and the Seven Network.

== 1976 ==
Held at the Sydney Opera House on Friday 8 October 1976.

- Gold Sammy: Helen Morse, Gary McDonald
- Best drama series: Power Without Glory
- Best lead actor in a television series: John Waters for Rush
- Best lead actress in a television series: Penny Hackforth-Jones for Tandarra
- Best actor in a single television performance: Hugh Keays-Byrne for Rush (ep: 'A shilling A Day')
- Best actress in a single television performance: Maggie Millar for Homicide (ep: 'The Life and Time of Tina Kennedy')
- Best new talent: Mark Holden
- Best comedy series: The Norman Gunston Show
- Best comedy television series writer: Bull Harding
- Best variety performer: Don Lane
- Best current affairs series: Four Corners
- Best daytime series: The Mike Walsh Show
- Best documentary series: A Big Country
- Best light entertainment series: This Is Your Life
- Best musical series: Countdown
- Best film: Picnic At Hanging Rock
- Best film actor: Peter Cummins for The Removalists
- Best film actress: Helen Morse
- Best film supporting actor: Reg Lye for Sunday Too Far Away
- Best film supporting actress: Jacki Weaver for Caddie
- Best juvenile film performance: Robert Bettles

== 1977 ==
- Gold Sammy: Harry Butler, Caroline Jones
- Best actor in a television series: Martin Vaughan for Power Without Glory
- Best actress in a television series: Lorraine Bayly for The Sullivans
- Best supporting actor in a television series: Andrew McFarlane for The Sullivans
- Best documentary series: In the Wild
- Best current affairs series: Four Corners
- Best film: The Devil's Playground
- Best film actor: Nick Tate for The Devil's Playground
- Best film actress: Ruth Cracknell for The Singer and the Dancer

== 1978 ==
- Gold: Mike Walsh, June Salter
- Chips Rafferty Memorial Award: Ken G Hall
- Best Actor in a Single TV Performance: Tony Bonner for End of Summer
- Best Actress in a Single TV Performance: Davina Whitehouse for The Night Nurse
- Best Actor in a TV Series: George Mallaby for Cop Shop
- Best Actress in a TV Series: Lorraine Bayly for The Sullivans
- Best Variety Performer: Julie Anthony
- Best Variety Program: Julie Anthony's First Special
- Best Comedy Program: The Norman Gunston Show
- Best Drama Series: The Sullivans
- Best TV Play: End of Summer
- Best News Coverage: Brisbane shoot-out (QTQ9)
- Best Documentary: A Big Country
- Best Current Affairs Program: Four Corners 'Utah' report
- Best Children's Series: Wombat (BTQ7)
- Best Sports Coverage: Australian Open Golf 1977
- Best Light Entertainment Program: The Mike Walsh Show
- Best Writer TV Series: Tony Morphett for The Sullivans
- Best Writer TV Play: Cliff Green for End of Summer

== 1979 ==
Held in Sydney at the Seymour Centre on 17 October 1979.

- Gold Sammy: Marcia Hines, Mike Walsh
- Chips Rafferty Memorial Award: Stanley Hawes
- Best drama series: Against the Wind
- Best TV play: The Plumber
- Best actor in a single TV performance: John Hargreaves for A Good Thing Going
- Best actress in a single TV performance: Belinda Giblin for Say You Want Me
- Best actor in a TV series: Gerard Kennedy for Against the Wind
- Best actress in a TV series: Kerry McGuire for Against the Wind
- Best television variety performer: Marcia Hines
- Best new talent: Mel Gibson
- Best film: Cathy's Child
- Best film actress: Michele Fawdon for Cathy's Child
- Best film actor: Alan Cassell for Cathy's Child
- Best light entertainment program: Parkinson in Australia
- Best comedy program: Tickled Pink (episode: 'Neutral Ground')
- Best variety program: TV Follies (episode: 'Hollywood')
- Best documentary: The Last Tasmanian
- Best news coverage: Pentridge Riot (GTV9 Melbourne)
- Best current affairs program: 60 Minutes
- Best sports coverage: Australian Open Golf (Nine Network)
- Best children's series: Top Mates
- Best costume design: Claire Griffin for Against the Wind
- Best art direction: Quentin Hole for Ride On Stranger
- Best writer (TV series): Peter Yeldham for Run From the Morning
- Best writer (TV play): Peter Weir for The Plumber
- Best television editing: Michael Balson for Mutiny on the Western Front
- Best film direction: George Miller for Mad Max
- Best sound: Mad Max
- Best special effects: Mad Max
- Best film editing: Mad Max
- Best theme music: Mad Max

== 1980 ==
Held in Sydney on 17 October 1980.

- Gold Sammy: Bert Newton, Caroline Jones
- Chips Rafferty Memorial Award: Hector Crawford
- Best Actor in a Single TV Performance: Richard Moir for Players to the Gallery
- Best Actress in a Single TV Performance: Robyn Nevin for A Toast to Melba.
- Best Actor in a TV Series: Peter Adams for Cop Shop
- Best Actress in TV Series: Sheila Florance for Prisoner
- Best Film Actor: Jack Thompson for Breaker Morant
- Best Film Actress: Judy Davis for My Brilliant Career
- Best Supporting Film Actor: Robert Grubb for My Brilliant Career
- Best Supporting Film Actress: Wendy Hughes for My Brilliant Career
- Best Variety Performer: Garry McDonald
- Best New Talent: Tracy Mann
- Best Drama Series: Cop Shop
- Best Short Drama Series: Players to the Gallery
- Best Comedy Program: Kingswood Country
- Best TV Play: Burn the Butterflies
- Best Variety Program: The Royal Charity Concert
- Best Film: Breaker Morant
- Best Short-Length Film (factual): Now You're Talking
- Best Short-Length Film (fiction): Gary's Story
- Best Animated Film: no award but a judges' commendation for The Little Convict
- Best Documentary Program: Song for Melbourne
- Best News Coverage: Moreton Bay Rescue BTQ7 Brisbane
- Best Current Affairs Program: 60 Minutes
- Best Sports Coverage: Seven's Big League (ATN 7 Sydney)
- Best Children's Series: Young Ramsay
- Best Light Entertainment Series: Parkinson in Australia
- Best Cinematographer (film): Vincent Monton for Thirst
- Best Cinematographer (TV): Ross Berryman for The John Sullivan Story
- Best Art Direction (TV): Guhar Jurjans, Paul Cleveland, Alwyn Harbott for Lucinda Brayford
- Best Art Direction (film): John Dowding for Thirst
- Best Writer Feature Film: Eleanor Witcombe for My Brilliant Career
- Best Writer TV Series: Denise Morgan for Prisoner
- Best Writer TV Play: Keith Thompson for Gail
- Best Theme Music: Peter Sculthorpe for Manganinnie
- Best Editing (film): Bill Anderson for Breaker Morant
- Best Editing (TV): Colin Grieve for Time for a Commercial
- Best Special Effects (film): Conrad Rothman for Harlequin
- Best Direction (film): Bruce Beresford for Breaker Morant
- Best Direction (TV): Alan Burke for A Toast to Melba
- Best Sound (film): Adrian Carr, Garry Wilkins for Harlequin
- Best Costume Design: Anna Senior for My Brilliant Career

== 1981 ==
Held in Sydney on 21 August 1981.

- Gold: Michael Parkinson, Judy Davis
- Chips Rafferty Memorial Award: Enid Lorimer
- Best actor in a single television performance: Rade Serbedzija for The Liberation of Skopje
- Best actress in a single television performance: Michelle Fawdon for Spring and fall
- Best film actor: John Hargreaves for Hoodwink
- Best film actress: Judy Davis for Winter of Our Dreams
- Best actor in a television series: David Cameron for Water Under the Bridge
- Best actress in a television series: Robyn Nevin for Water Under the Bridge
- Best supporting film actor: Bill Kerr for Gallipoli
- Best supporting film actress: Cathy Downes for Winter of Our Dreams
- Best variety performer: John Farnham
- Best new talent: Mark Lee for Gallipoli
- Best drama series: The Sullivans
- Best short drama series: I Can Jump Puddles
- Best comedy program: Kingswood Country
- Best television play: No award
- Best variety program: Poo Over Brisbane
- Best film: Gallipoli
- Best short-length film (factual): Life Begins at Forty
- Best short-length film (fiction): The Uninvited
- Best animated film: No award
- Best documentary program: Please Don't Leave Me
- Best news coverage: The Belfast riots (HSV 7)
- Best current affairs program: Scoop (0-28)
- Best sports coverage: Hardie Ferodo 1000 (ATN 7)
- Best children's series: The Patchwork Hero
- Best light entertainment series: The Mike Walsh Show
- Best cinematographer (film): Russell Boyd for Gallipoli
- Best cinematographer (TV): Dan Burstall for Water Under the Bridge
- Best art direction (TV): Logan Brewer for Water Under the Bridge
- Best art direction (film): Herbert Pinter and Wendy Weir for Gallipoli
- Best Writer Feature Film: David Williamson for Gallipoli
- Best writer TV series: Ian Jones and Bronwyn Binns for The Last Outlaw
- Best writer TV play: No award
- Best theme music: Bruce Smeaton for The Timeless Land
- Best editing film: Edward McQueen Mason for Roadgames
- Best editing (TV): Gary Albery for 60 Minutes
- Best special effects (film): Monty Fieguth, Chris Murray and Vic Wilson for The Survivor
- Best direction (film): Peter Weir for Gallipoli
- Best direction (TV): George Miller for The Last Outlaw
- Best sound (film): Greg Bell, Don Connolly and Peter Fenton for Gallipoli
- Best costume design: Roger Kirk for Farnham and Byrne
