= The Odd Angry Shot (novel) =

1975 novel by William L. Nagle

- First edition
- Author: William L. Nagle
- Language: English
- Subject: Vietnam War, military history of Australia during the Vietnam War
- Publisher: Angus and Robertson
- Publication date: 1975
- Publication place: Australia
- Media type: Print (hardcover & paperback)
- ISBN: 0-207-14208-4

The Odd Angry Shot (1975) is a novel by Australian author William Nagle.

== Synopsis ==
The novel is based on the author's own experience in 3 Squadron SAS Australian Army, and portrays the boredom, mateship, humour, and fear of a group of Australian soldiers deployed to South Vietnam in the late 1960s.

The novel opens with the Australian soldiers embarking for Vietnam. The soldiers arrive at Nui Dat in the wet season. In the ensuing months, the protagonist "faces fearful villagers, hunts an elusive, ubiquitous enemy. He goes on patrol, sweating with fear; endures leeches, officious paper-pushers, a thieving orang-utan. He sees friends maimed and mashed; retaliates with casual brutality to locals; finds solace in bar girls and in practical jokes with a pet snake." The novel climaxes with the Tet Offensive.

Upon returning home, the now deeply cynical soldiers are met with hostility by the Australian public who resent their participation in the war.

== Themes ==
The novel is overwhelmingly cynical about the war from the point of view of the ordinary soldier. Nagle describes them as "an army of frustrated pawns, tired, wet and sold out".

The soldiers experience a dawning belief that Australia should not have been in the war.

Nagle believed that the ostensible aims of the conflict, which was to counter communism and enable South Vietnamese self-determination “were fatally compromised by the strategic dependence of Australian troops upon an inferior American military command structure, by the unreliability of the South Vietnamese allies, by the difficulty of distinguishing friend from foe in the field and by the increasing hostility to the war on the home front.”

== Publishing history ==
After the original publication of the novel by Angus and Robertson in 1975, it was then reprinted by Angus and Robertson in 1979, and then published by Text Publishing as part of their Text Classics range in 2013.

== Film adaptation ==
The novel was adapted into a movie of the same name which was released in 1979. It was written and directed by Tom Jeffrey and featured Graham Kennedy as Harry, John Hargreaves as Bung, John Jarrett as Bill, Bryan Brown as Rogers, and Graeme Blundell as Dawson.

== See also ==
- 1975 in Australian literature

== Notes ==
- The novel was commended by the judges of the 1975 National Book Council Award.
