= Logie Awards of 1980 =

22nd Logie Awards
- Date: 14 March 1980
- Site: Hilton Hotel, Melbourne, Victoria
- Hosted by: Bert Newton

Highlights
- Gold Logie: Mike Walsh
- Most awards: A Good Thing Going (4)

Television coverage
- Network: Nine Network

The 22nd Annual TV Week Logie Awards was held on Friday 14 March, 1980 at the Hilton Hotel in Melbourne, and broadcast on the Nine Network. The ceremony was hosted by Bert Newton. Guests included Cilla Black, Michael York, Paul Michael Glaser, Greg Evigan, Lee Meriwether, Nicola Pagett, Linda Gray and John Inman, as well as Sesame Street's Big Bird and Oscar the Grouch.

== National Awards ==
=== Gold Logie ===
Most Popular Personality on Australian Television
Winner:

Mike Walsh in The Mike Walsh Show (Nine Network)

=== Acting/Presenting ===
Most Popular Lead Actor in a Series
Winner: Paul Cronin in The Sullivans (Nine Network)

Most Popular Lead Actress in a Series
Winner: Paula Duncan in Cop Shop (Seven Network)

Most Popular New Talent
Winner: Vera Plevnik in The John Sullivan Story (Nine Network)

Best Lead Actor in a Series
Winner: Peter Adams in Cop Shop (Seven Network)

Best Lead Actress in a Series
Winner: Carol Burns in Prisoner (Network Ten)

Best Supporting Actor in a Series
Winner: Terry Norris in Cop Shop (Seven Network)

Best Supporting Actress in a Series
Winner: Noni Hazelhurst in Ride on Stranger (ABC)

Best Lead Actor in a Miniseries or Telemovie
Winner: John Hargreaves in A Good Thing Going (Nine Network)

Best Lead Actress in a Miniseries or Telemovie
Winner: Bunney Brooke in The Rock Pool (ABC)

Best Supporting Actor in a Miniseries or Telemovie
Winner: Chris Haywood in A Good Thing Going (Nine Network)

Best Supporting Actress in a Miniseries or Telemovie
Winner: Veronica Lang in A Good Thing Going (Nine Network)

Best Performance by a Juvenile
Winner: Miles Buchanan in A Good Thing Going (Nine Network)

Best TV Comedy Performer
Winner: Garry McDonald in The Norman Gunston Show (Seven Network)

Best TV Script
Winner: Michael Cove for A Place in the World (ABC)

TV Reporter of the Year
Winner: George Negus in 60 Minutes (Nine Network)

=== Most Popular Programs ===
Most Popular Drama Series
Winner: The Sullivans (Nine Network)

Most Popular Variety/Comedy Show
Winner: The Don Lane Show (Nine Network)

Most Popular Public Affairs Program
Winner: 60 Minutes (Nine Network)

=== Best/Outstanding Programs ===
Best New Drama Series
Winner: Prisoner (Network Ten)

Best Miniseries or Telemovie
Winner: Burn the Butterflies (ABC)

Best Documentary Series
Winner: This Fabulous Century (Seven Network)

Best Single Documentary
Winner: Mutiny on the Western Front (Seven Network)

Best Sports Report or Documentary
Winner: Iron Men of the Sea (Network Ten)

Best News Report
Winner: "Star Hotel Riot" (NBN-3, Newcastle)

Outstanding Public Affairs Report
Winner: "Child Prostitution", Four Corners (ABC)

Outstanding Coverage of a Sports Report
Winner: Test cricket (Nine Network)

Outstanding Contribution to Children's Television
Winner: Simon Townsend's Wonder World (Network Ten)

Outstanding Contribution by a Regional Station
Winner: Beating Around the Bush (NBN-3, Newcastle)

== State Awards ==
=== New South Wales ===
Most Popular Male
Winner: Mike Walsh (Nine Network)

Most Popular Female
Winner: Katrina Lee (Network Ten)

Most Popular Show
Winner: The Mike Walsh Show (Nine Network)

=== Queensland ===
Most Popular Male
Winner: Glenn Taylor (Nine Network)

Most Popular Female
Winner: Jacki MacDonald (Network Ten)

Most Popular Show
Winner: Today Tonight (Nine Network)

=== South Australia ===
Most Popular Male
Winner: Tony Murphy (Nine Network)

Most Popular Female
Winner: Pam Tamblyn (Seven Network)

Most Popular Show
Winner: Music Express (Seven Network)

=== Tasmania ===
Most Popular Male
Winner: Tom Payne (TVT-6)

Most Popular Female
Winner: Sue Barnett (TVT-6)

Most Popular Show
Winner: People, Places, Politics (TVT-6)

=== Victoria ===
Most Popular Male
Winner: Bert Newton (Nine Network)

Most Popular Female
Winner: Annette Allison (Network Ten)

Most Popular Show
Winner: The Don Lane Show (Nine Network)

=== Western Australia ===
Most Popular Male
Winner: Terry Willesee (Nine Network)

Most Popular Female
Winner: Judy Thompson (Seven Network)

Most Popular Show
Winner: Terry Willesee's Perth (Nine Network)
