= Veronica Lang =

Australian actress

- Occupation: Actor
- Years active: 1964–present
- Known for: Don’s Party (1976); Callan (1974)
- Spouse: Michael Aitkens (div.)
- Children: 2

Veronica Lang is an Australian-born actress.

== Career ==
Lang started her acting career in England in theatre and television, before working in her native country. She also briefly worked in America.

Lang's television credits are numerous. Her British appearances include Upstairs Downstairs, Crown Court, Inspector Morse, Moon and Sun, Murder in Mind, Grange Hill, Heartbeat and The Bill. Her Australian television credits include Matlock Police, Rush, Bluey, The Young Doctors, Chopper Squad, Skyways, Cop Shop, A Country Practice, Halifax f.p. and Heartbreak High. She also appeared in the miniseries The Dismissal and Vietnam (alongside Nicole Kidman),

Lang's film credits Callan (1974), Don’s Party (1976), Say You Want Me (1977), A Good Thing Going (1978), The Clinic (1982) and Decadence (1994).

She won the 1977 AFI Award for Best Actress in a Supporting Role for her role in the film adaptation of Don's Party and the 1980 Logie Award for Best Supporting Actress in a Miniseries/Telemovie for A Good Thing Going.

== Filmography ==
=== Film ===
Year	Title	Role	Type
1969	Mini Weekend	Jenny	Feature film, UK
1974	Callan	Liz, Hunter's Secretary	Feature film, UK
1976	Don’s Party	Jody	Feature film
1977	The Claim		TV film
1977	Say You Want Me		TV film
1977	Ballantyne's Mission		TV film
1978	A Good Thing Going	Jane Harris	TV film
1979	Roadhouse		TV film
1982	The Clinic	Nancy	Feature film
1985	After Hours	Eileen Phillips	Film short
1990	The Englishwoman: An Account of the Life of Emily Hobhouse (aka Burenkrieg)	Emily Hobhouse	Feature film, US/South Africa
1994	Decadence	The Entourage	Feature film, UK/Germany
2017	Flow	Irene	Film short

=== Television ===
Year	Title	Role	Type
1964	Story Parade	Rosie Darcy	TV series UK, 1 episode
1964	A World of His Own	Guest role	TV series UK, 1 episode
1965	The Likely Lads	Cecile	TV series UK, 1 episode
1965	Legend Of Death	Estelle	TV series UK, 2 episodes
1965	Riviera Police	Jean Howard	TV series UK, 1 episode
1967	Champion House	Tania	TV series UK, 1 episode
1971	Justice	Secretary	TV series UK, 1 episode
1972	Upstairs Downstairs	The Jeweller's Wife	TV series UK, 1 episode
1972	Six Faces	Receptionist	TV series UK, 2 episodes
1973	Harriet's Back in Town	Louise Wimbourne	TV series UK, 2 episodes
1973	Crown Court	Fiona Gray	TV series UK, 3 episodes
1973	Whodunnit?	Jill Mather	TV series UK, 1 episode
1973	The Dragon's Opponent	Mimi Crawford	TV series UK, 2 episodes
1974	Napoleon and Love	Madame de Remusat	TV miniseries UK, 5 episodes
1974	Matlock Police	Judy	TV series, 1 episode
1975	The Sweeney	Sally Labbett	TV series UK, 1 episode
1976	Rush	Melanie Parker	TV series, 1 episode
1976	Star Maidens	Nola	TV series UK, 1 episode
1976	Space 1999	Lyra / Maurna	TV series UK, 1 episode
1976	CBS Children's Film Festival	Mrs. Graham	TV series US, 1 episode
1976	Chimpmates	Mrs. Graham	TV series UK, 3 episodes
1977	Bluey	Sylvia Granger	TV series, 1 episode 30: "A Political Animal"
1977–1981	Cop Shop	Sue Brady / Ann Carter / Claire Scott	TV series, 4 episodes
1977	The Young Doctors	Diane Pitt / Lesley Collins	TV series, 7 episodes
1978	Chopper Squad	Margaret	TV series, 1 episode 7: "Lifeboat"
1979	Skyways	Sarah Blake	TV series, 3 episodes
1982; 1984	A Country Practice	Kate Darcy	TV series, 2 episodes
1983	A Country Practice	Janet Swanson	TV series, 2 episodes
1983	The Dismissal	Reporter	TV miniseries, 1 episode
1984	A Country Practice	Lori Morgan	TV series, 5 episodes
1985	Theatre Night	Lady Plymdale	TV series UK, 1 episode
1985	Winners	Alison Trig	TV film series, 1 episode: "Room to Move"
1987	Vietnam	Evelyn Goddard	TV miniseries, 10 episodes
1987	Rafferty's Rules		TV series, 1 episode
1987	Willing and Abel		TV series, 1 episode
1991	Inspector Morse	Julia	TV series UK, 1 episode
1992	Moon and Son	Annabelle Garvie	TV series UK, 1 episode
1995	Halifax f.p.	Cheryl Daleford	TV film series, 1 episode
1996	Heartbreak High	Vera Sumich	TV series, 1 episode
1997	Grange Hill	Francesca	TV series UK, 5 episodes
1997	Heartbeat	Mrs. Dobson	TV series UK, 1 episode
2001	Murder in Mind	Alice Young	TV series UK, 1 episode
2003	The Bill	Estate Agent	TV series UK, 1 episode

== Theatre ==
Year	Title	Role	Type
1964	Busybody	Claire	Hull New Theatre, Pavilion Theatre, Bournemouth, & other locations with Audrey Lupton & Arthur Lane and Aytell Productions
1967	In at the Death	The Secretary	Yvonne Arnaud Theatre, Guildford and Phoenix Theatre, London with Cooney Productions & Enterprises
	The Nature of Revolution		Royal Court Theatre, London
	We Bombed in New Haven	Lead	Forum Theatre
	The Sum of Us	Joyce	Warehouse Theatre, Croydon
	The Ant and the Grasshopper	Zelda Fitzgerald	Basement Theatre
1971	Prometheus Bound	Sea Bird 3	Mermaid Theatre, London
	Ordinary People	Beth	Greenwich Theatre, London
1975	Don's Party	Jody	Royal Court Theatre, London with The English Stage Company
1977	The Norman Conquests	Annie	Seymour Centre, Sydney with Old Tote Theatre Company
	Soldiering on Talking Heads	Muriel	Frinton Rep Theatre
1980	Pyjama Tops	Yvonne Charles	Newcastle Civic Theatre, Regal Theatre, Perth, Theatre Royal Sydney, Her Majesty's Theatre, Melbourne, Canberra Theatre with Australian Elizabethan Theatre Trust & J. C. Williamson
2006	Blithe Spirit	Madame Arcati / Mrs Bradman	Frinton Summer Theatre with Connaught Productions
2011–2013	Barefoot in the Park		UK tour to Malvern Theatres, Worcestershire, Theatre Royal, Bath, Oxford Playhouse, Richmond Theatre, London, Cambridge Arts Theatre with Yvonne Arnaud Theatre
2014	Daytona		UK tour with Lee Dean
2018	Away		Bondi Pavilion, Sydney
2020	Hamlet	Gertrude	Online - Australia with Streamed Shakespeare

== Awards ==
Year	Award	Category	Work	Result
1977	AFI Awards	Best Supporting Actress in Film	Don’s Party	Won
1980	Logie Awards	Best Supporting Actress in a Mini-Series/Telemovie	A Good Thing Going	Won
