= Serge Lazareff =

Australian actor and scriptwriter (1944–2021)

- Born: Serge Constantine Lazareff; 7 August 1944; Shanghai, China
- Died: 20 August 2021 (aged 77)
- Occupations: Actor; screenwriter
- Years active: 1968–2004
- Known for: Young Ramsay; Cash and Company; The Young Doctors; Prisoner

Serge Constantine Lazareff (7 August 1944 – 20 August 2021) was an Australian actor and screenwriter/editor, who was born in Shanghai, China. He appeared in 54 screen roles from the late 1960s until 1999, before starting a second career as a writer for TV series.

== Career ==
Lazareff performed in many Australian television series from the late 1960s to the late 1990s. He featured in The Sullivans and made numerous appearances in Crawford Productions police procedural shows including Homicide, Division 4, Matlock Police and Chopper Squad. He had a featured part in the 1970 ABC-TV drama series Dynasty as John and Kathy’s university student son, Christopher. He also starred in Cash and Company, a 1970s historical adventure series, as the bushranger of the title, Sam Cash, and in cult soap opera Prisoner as David Andrews.

Lazareff is probably best remembered by Australian audiences for his role as Ray Turner in the 1970s TV drama Young Ramsay, in which he starred alongside friend and co-star John Hargreaves.

In 1976, Lazareff starred in six-part ABC sitcom The Rise and Fall of Wellington Boots as Alexander 'Boots' Wellington, a latter-day Huckleberry Finn. He also appeared in The Young Doctors, playing fake Dr Ian Parish (whose real name was revealed to be Jack Trainer).

Further television credits included Spyforce, Boney Glenview High, Cop Shop, Bellamy, Carson's Law, A Country Practice, Special Squad, and Sons and Daughters. In 1988, he starred as Neil Travers in short-lived soap opera Richmond Hill, and in 1989 E Street he played rapist and murderer Sam Bullmer.

His film credits include biographical bushranger film Ned Kelly (1970) alongside Mick Jagger, western comedy The True Story of Eskimo Nell (1975) and World War I film The Lighthorsemen (1987).

From the late 1980s, Lazareff worked primarily as a writer and script editor for TV series including Heartbreak High, A Country Practice, Water Rats, All Saints, Home and Away, Neighbours, Mission Top Secret and Head Start.

== Death ==
Lazareff died in August 2021, after apparently having been ill for some time. Although there were no mainstream media reports, he was included in the 2022 Logie Awards "In Memoriam" montage, alongside Bert Newton, Shane Warne, Jeanne Little and Dieter Brummer, while Tim Minchin performed an accompanying musical tribute.

== Filmography ==
=== Film ===
Year	Title	Role	Type
1971	3 to Go: Judy	Mike	Short film
1972	Flashpoint	David	Feature film
1975	Sidecar Racers	Bluey Wilson	Feature film
1975	The True Story of Eskimo Nell (aka Dick Down Under)	Mexico Pete	Feature film
1976	Eliza Fraser	Doyle	Feature film
1977	Say You Want Me	Tony Crosby	Feature film
1982	The Best of Friends	Colin	Feature film
1986	Departure	Simon Swift	Feature film
1987	The Lighthorsemen	Major George Rankin	Feature film
1989	Luigi's Ladies	Trev	Feature film

=== Television ===
Year	Title	Role	Type
1969; 1970	The Rovers	Constable / Tony / Fisherman	4 episodes
1970	The Long Arm	Neville Martin	1 episode
1970	Ned Kelly	Wild Wright	TV movie
1970–1971	Dynasty	Christopher Mason	22 episodes
1970–1976	Homicide	Cliff Freeman / Lenny Concho / Leopold Alexander Hamilton / Alan Kent	4 episodes
1971	The Thursday Creek Mob	Private Shorty MacGoohan	
1971–1975	Division 4	Ivan Richardson / Desmond Baker / Iggy / Stuart Sullivan	5 episodes
1972	Quartet	Marlon	Miniseries, 1 episode
1972	Over There		1 episode
1972	The Spoiler	Teddy	13 episodes
1972; 1973	Boney	Greg Green / Dick Lake	2 episodes
1972–1974	Matlock Police	Arnie Baker / Lenny Drummond / Bob Parker / Bobby Hughes / Patrick Hayes	5 episodes
1973	Spyforce	Lance Corporal Wayne Goodser	1 episode
1973	Ryan	Patrick	1 episode
1975	Cash and Company	Sam Cash	Miniseries, 13 episodes, main role
1975	The Rise and Fall of Wellington Boots	Alexander 'Boots' Wellington	Main role
1976	The Judging Ring		TV movie
1976	McManus MPB	Mr. Charles	TV movie
1976	The Lost Islands	Guard Quat / Guardian	2 episodes
1976–1977	Bluey	Joey Raven / Janos	2 episodes
1977	The Outsiders	Brad Fraser	1 episode
1977	Say You Want Me	Tony Crosby	TV movie
1978	Chopper Squad	Criminal	1 episode
1979	Glenview High		1 episode
1979	The Young Doctors	Dr. Ian Parrish (Jack Trainer)	8 episodes
1977–1980	Young Ramsay	Ray Turner	26 episodes
1978–1982	Cop Shop	Angelo Carrazzo / Glen Harmer / Ken McGregor / Steve Daniels / Noel Shanklin / Dan Bridges	13 episodes
1981	Bellamy	Blake	1 episode
1981	Prisoner	David Andrews	24 episodes
1981	Rusty Bugles		TV movie
1982	1915	Blackly Reid	Miniseries, 5 episodes
1982–1987	A Country Practice	David King / David Cody / Wilson / Peter 'Hotwire' Keene	8 episodes
1984	Special Squad	Kellet	Episode 31: "Brothers"
1984	Carson's Law	Ian Ainsley	2 episodes
1985	Five Mile Creek	Mickey	1 episode
1985	Possession		1 episode
1987	Great Expectations: The Untold Story	Courtney	TV movie
1987	Sons and Daughters	Detective Morris	4 episodes
1988	The Dirtwater Dynasty	Harvey Purcell	Miniseries, 1 episode
1988	Richmond Hill	Neil Travers	1 episode
1989	E Street	Sam Bullmer	19 episodes
1991	G.P.	Bert Lang	2 episodes
1999	Heartbreak High	Dragon	2 episodes

== Theatre ==
Year	Title	Role	Notes	Ref
1967	The Insect Play	Otto	UNSW with NIDA	
1967	Camino Real	Casanova (ACT III) / The Dreamer (Act I/II)	UNSW with NIDA	
1967	Old Wives Tale	Clunch / Huanebango / Sexton	UNSW with NIDA	
1967	Viet Rock			
1967	Production Course Graduation Plays: The Blind Men	King Lamprido	Jane St Theatre, Sydney with UNSW / NIDA	
1968	A Singular Man		Ensemble Theatre, Sydney	
1968	An Enemy of the People		Ensemble Theatre, Sydney	
1970	We Bombed in Newhaven		Australian tour with Ensemble Theatre, Sydney	
1970	Tom		Nimrod St Theatre, Sydney with MTC	
1972	Rooted		Nimrod St Theatre, Sydney	
1975	Down Under		Stables Theatre, Sydney with King O'Malley Theatre Company	
1975	The Joss Adams Show		Nimrod St Theatre, Sydney	
1976	Perfectly Alright		Nimrod St Theatre, Sydney	
1976	Poor Jenny		Nimrod St Theatre, Sydney	
1976	The Dark and Endless Sky		Nimrod St Theatre, Sydney	
1978	Catch Me If You Can	Daniel Corban	Marian St Theatre, Sydney	
1979	The Warhorse		Q Theatre, Penrith	
1983	All My Sons		Sydney Opera House with Ensemble Theatre	
1984	1984 A.D.		Arts Theatre, Adelaide, University of Sydney with AETT	
1987	D Week		Stables Theatre, Sydney with Griffin Theatre Company	
1988	The Warhorse		Ensemble Theatre, Sydney	
1988	The Archbishop's Ceiling		Ensemble Theatre, Sydney	
