= Scoop (Australian TV series) =

Australian magazine style television show (1980–1982)

Scoop, subtitled Significant Community Observations of People was an Australian magazine style television show broadcast by SBS. The show which was produced by DNM Productions debuted in October 1980 and was first hosted by Xavier de Barcenas Noulie Skoumbas took over as host in 1982. It focused on "the cultural activities of ethnic groups in Australia."

In 1981 Scoop won a Sammy Award for best current affairs programme. This caused a small amount of controversy as the billed themselves as a magazine-community affairs program and not as current affairs.
