= Say You Want Me =

- Directed by: Oliver Howes
- Written by: Laura Jones
- Produced by: Don Harley
- Starring: Belinda Giblin; Serge Lazareff; Hugh Keays-Byrne; Tom Oliver; Henri Szeps; Tex Morton
- Edited by: Tom Foley
- Production company: Film Australia
- Distributed by: Nine Network
- Release dates: 6 June 1979 (Sydney); 1 April 1980 (Melbourne)
- Running time: 90 mins
- Country: Australia
- Language: English
- Budget: $150,000

Say You Want Me is a 1977 Australian film directed by Oliver Howes. It is about a woman who is raped by one of her husband's business associates.

The film was one of two television movies made by Film Australia for the Nine Network. (The other was A Good Thing Going.) It was shot in 1977 but not screened until 1979.

== Premise ==
Julie Crosby (Belinda Giblin), wife of radio presenter Tony (Serge Lazareff) is raped by property developer Harry Kirby (Hugh Keays-Byrne). Tony struggles to accept it and accuses Julie of leading Kirby on. Julie goes to the police but struggles to find corroborating evidence for her case.

== Cast ==
- Belinda Giblin as Julie Crosby
- Serge Lazareff as Tony Crosby
- Hugh Keays-Byrne as Harry Kirby
- Tom Oliver as a photographer
- Henri Szeps as Jim Morton, Tony's boss
- Tex Morton
- Robyn Nevin as Interviewing Police Officer
- Gordon Glenwright
- Moya O'Sullivan as Julie's mother
- Anne Haddy
- Philippa Baker
- Wendy Playfair
- Anna Volska as a Qantas personnel officer
- Peter Adams as a doctor
- Tony Alvarez as a hairdresser
- Les Foxcroft as a scientist
- Veronica Lang

== Reception ==
Don Groves of the Sun Herald called it "a muddled, murky film riddled with absurdities" feeling it was not realistic that the wife would not report the rape straight away and that the husband would blame the wife.

Christine Hogan of the Sydney Morning Herald thought the script was "full of holes".

== Awards ==
Belinda Giblin's performance earned her an award for Best Actress in a single TV performance at the Sammy Awards.
