= Jane Harders =

Australian actor

- Born: Queensland, Australia
- Education: National Institute of Dramatic Art
- Occupations: Actress, narrator, voice coach
- Years active: 1969-2020
- Awards: Helpmann Award

Jane Harders is an Australian actress. She has appeared in film and television, on stage and radio as a narrator and as a voice dialect coach. She played Janet Weiss in the original Australian production of The Rocky Horror Show in 1974.

== Early life and education ==
Harders is originally from Queensland. She is a graduate of Sydney's NIDA, with a diploma in Voice Studies and gained early acting experience in student productions. In the late 1960's, she began her career at Sydney's Old Tote Theatre Company, and was one of the original members of the Nimrod Theatre Company. She has appeared in numerous musicals and revues.

== Career ==
Harders has appeared in several films including Caddie (1976), Flirting (1991) and Mao's Last Dancer (2009). Her television credits include 1984 cricket miniseries Bodyline (alongside Hugo Weaving and Gary Sweet), The Alien Years (1988), teen series Heartbreak High, drama series Doctor Doctor and Spirited.

Harders is also a voiceover artist, having narrated for ABC Radio, television documentaries on SBS, and audio adaptations of classic literature. She has also been a voice and dialect coach for stage and screen.

Harders has worked extensively in theatre, for Sydney Theatre Company, Queensland Theatre, and Melbourne Theatre Company. She has starred in The Importance of Being Earnest, Les Liaisons Dangereuses, Arcadia, The Cherry Orchard, Away, and the original 1974 Australian production of The Rocky Horror Show, in which she played Janet. She received a Helpmann Award for Best Supporting Actress for her performance in Copenhagen.

== Acting credits ==
=== Film ===
Year	Title	Role	Notes
1972	Shirley Thompson vs. the Aliens	Shirley Thompson	
1976	Caddie	Vikki	
1978	The Chant of Jimmie Blacksmith	Mrs. Healey	
1979	The Journalist	Wendy Morris	
1980	The Earthling	Molly Ann Hogan	
1991	Flirting	Miss Silvia Anderson	
1994	The Roly Poly Man	Jane Lewis	
1999	Trust Me		Short film
2007	The Uncertainty Principle	Elisabeth	Short film
2009	Mao's Last Dancer	Senator's wife	

=== Television ===
Year	Title	Role	Notes
1971	Andersen Monogatari	Voice	
1972	Quartet		Anthology series, 1 episode
1973	The Aunty Jack Show	Woman on Television	Season 2, episode 1
1973	The Three Musketeers	Voice	Animated TV movie
1975	Silent Number	Mrs Lucas	1 episode
1975	Shannon's Mob	Mira	1 episode
1975	King's Men	Constable Maple Brown	1 episode
1976	Rush	Jessie Farrar	10 episodes
1976	Alvin Purple	Guest	
1977	Hotel Story		
1978	Young Ramsay	Lillian Payntor	1 episode
1978	Tickled Pink	Marianne	1 episode
1979	Cop Shop	Norma Blake	2 episodes
1979	A Place in the World	Polly Paget	Miniseries, 1 episode
1979	The Mismatch	Marsha Harrington	TV movie
1979	TV Follies	Linda Zimmerman	
1980	Australian Theatre Festival		Episode: "A Toast to Melba"
1982	Jonah		4 episodes
1983	The Weekly's War	Tilly Shelton-Smith	Miniseries, 2 episodes
1984	Mother & Son	Matron	1 episode
1984	Bodyline	Mrs Jardine	Miniseries, 2 episodes
1984–1993	A Country Practice	Bronwyn Gibson / Sarah Fitzgerald	4 episodes
1986	The Adventures of Tom Sawyer	Becky Thatcher / Aunt Polly (voices)	Animated TV movie
1987	Rob Roy	Voice	Animated TV movie
1988	The Alien Years	Edith	Miniseries
1989	The Flying Doctors	Helen	1 episode
1994	Heartbreak High	Maureen Milano	3 episodes
1997	The Hostages	Marcia	TV movie
1997; 1999	Murder Call	Dr Lois Fisk / Mrs Henderson	2 episodes
2007	The Starter Wife	Wealthy Matron	Miniseries, 1 episode
2008	All Saints	Connie Mosdell	1 episode
2010–2011	Spirited	Rita	Seasons 1–2, 17 episodes
2011	The Jesters	Aunty Jane	1 episode
2018–2019	Doctor Doctor	Helen	5 episodes
2020	The End	Jillian Regan	1 episode

=== Theatre ===
Year	Title	Role	Notes	Ref.
1969	The Royal Hunt of the Sun	Dello, a wife of Atahuallpa		
1970	The Legend of King O'Malley		Old Tote Theatre, Sydney	
1970	Oedipus		Old Tote Theatre, Sydney	
1970	A Delicate Balance	Edna	STC	
1970	Biggles		Nimrod St Theatre, Sydney	
1971	Endgame		Nimrod St Theatre, Sydney	
1971	Flash Jim Vaux		Nimrod St Theatre, Sydney	
1972	Measure for Measure		Nimrod St Theatre, Sydney	
1972	Shadows of Blood		Nimrod St Theatre, Sydney	
1973	‘Tis Pity She’s a Whore		Old Tote Theatre, Sydney	
1974	The Rocky Horror Show	Janet Weiss	Harry M. Miller	
1977	Inner Voices	Anna / Princess / Ali / Baby Face	Nimrod St Theatre, Sydney	
1981	The Man from Mukinupin	Clarrie	Sydney Opera House with STC	
1982	You Can't Take it With You		Sydney Opera House with STC	
1983	The Cherry Orchard	Madame Ranevskaya	Sydney Opera House with STC	
1985	Arms and the Man	Raina	Seymour Centre, Sydney with Nimrod	
	Six Characters in Search of an Author	First Actress		
1986	Benefactors	Sheila	Northside Theatre, Sydney	
1987	What the Butler Saw	Mrs Prentice	Australian national tour	
1988	Away	Coral	US tour with STC	
1988	Summer of the Seventeenth Doll	Olive	US tour with STC	
1990	Rumors	Cookie Cusack	Australian national tour	
1991	Master Builder	Aline Solness	Belvoir St Theatre, Sydney	
1993–1994	Kafka Dances	Julie / Mother	Stables Theatre, Sydney with Griffin Theatre Company / STC	
1994	Things We Do for Love	Barbara	Marian St Theatre, Sydney	
1994	Arcadia	Lady Croom	STC	
1996	Heretic	Monica Freeman	STC / MTC	
2002	Copenhagen	Margrette Bohr	Australian national tour with STC / QTC / MTC	
2005	The Woman with Dog's Eyes	Penny Boyce	Griffin Theatre Company	
2008	The Importance of Being Earnest	Lady Bracknell	QPAC with QTC	
2012	Les Liaisons Dangereuses	Madame de Rosemonde	Wharf Theatre, Sydney with STC	
	The Cripple of Inishmaan	Mammy	STC	
	A Flea in Her Ear	Raymonde	STCSA	

== Awards and nominations ==
Year	Award	Category	Work	Result
2000	Australian Council for the Arts	Fellowship		Won
2003	Helpmann Awards	Best Female Actor in a Supporting Role in a Play	Copenhagen	Won
