= Jonathan Dawson =

Australian academic and filmmaker (1941–2013)

Jonathon Dawson
- Born: 24 November 1941; Melbourne, Victoria, Australia
- Died: 10 August 2013 (aged 71)
- Education: Melbourne University
- Occupations: Academic; filmmaker; film and literary critic; broadcaster

Jonathan Dawson (24 November 1941 – 10 August 2013) was an Australian academic, filmmaker, film and literary critic and broadcaster.

== Biography ==
Jonathan Dawson was born in Melbourne. At Melbourne University he graduated in English Honours and won awards for acting and two One Act Playwriting Competitions (The World Record Club Award). Published many poems and short stories and, later, as a poetry performer.was often accompanied by guitarist Glen Tomassetti at La Mama. His play, A Cup of Tea with Mrs Groom was performed at La Mama directed by Graeme Blundell. He also created two of the most successful university revues of the decade (1960s).

After graduating, Dawson joined the Australian Broadcasting Commission as a Trainee Radio and TV Producer/Director and directed many radio dramas and education programmes as well as dramas and documentaries. He left the ABC to join Crawford Productions as a writer director on TV serials Homicide and later Division 4. He then went on to Nine Network in Sydney to direct TV series The Link Men and write for other TV series including Rush and The Box.

Dawson continued to publish poetry, and short stories, but left the full-time film industry to set up the new media studies department, and screenwriting courses at the University of Canberra, leaving to help set up Griffith University's Foundation Year in 1975 where he worked to create the then new screen studies and production courses.

Jonathan Dawson had two children: Patrick (born 1 February 1971) and Olivia (born 8 October 1972). He lived and wrote full-time in Hobart, Tasmania with his wife, fashion designer and writer, Felicity Dawson. On 10 August 2013, Dawson died after a long battle with illness.

== 1960s, 1970s work ==
In the 1960s, Dawson wrote key policy essays (Overland (literary journal) etc.) on setting up a film industry, as well as becoming Victorian Chair of Australian Writers Guild on a platform of strong lobbying for local industry. He also began his parallel career as a public speaker and theorist on media and film policy issues, lecturing widely in the United Kingdom and Ireland.

While in Canberra he was appointed Art Director for the ground breaking 36 screen audio visual, forerunner of contemporary 'public installation' works, at the Australian Pavilion for Expo '74 in Spokane, Washington. At this time he also began reviewing films for the ABC. He also wrote a weekly crime and thriller review column in The Canberra Times (1972–75), and still reviews crime, thriller and cinema reference books in the Hobart Mercury (2000–2010).

Dawson continued to work as a writer director, primarily on commercials for clients like Qantas, Nestle, Volvo, as well as for many government election campaigns, creating a new style of "presidential" launch for the Federal Labor Party's successful national campaigns in 1983 and 1985 as well as directing TV commercials for Premier Neville Wran in New South Wales.

== 1980s, 1990s, and beyond ==
Dawson wrote and directed documentaries and documentary specials for the ABC (Australian Broadcasting Corporation) and commercial networks and the feature film Ginger Meggs in 1982. He was appointed to the ABC's first National Advisory Council after the Incorporation of the ABC in 1983, serving for three terms until 1990. While on the council, he produced many papers for working parties on various programme areas and audiences as well as helping prepare and edit the new ABC Charter produced by the ABC Board. He has continued to present papers and publish widely on Public Broadcasting and the ABC as well as convening and addressing rallies supporting the ABC and ABC staff.

In addition to teaching film and media studies he continued to publish critical essays and present learned papers at symposia and conferences internationally, with a particular and critical focus on empire building in film bodies and government policy along with many essays on Public Broadcasting. He published and co edited several books on film and the media including the Oxford University Press *Screenwriting in 2000. As a film maker who welcomed emerging writers, directors and students on his film shoots, he made contributions to the growing film industry of the 1970s right through to his pro bono political commercials on his retirement to Tasmania.

With his 1980 Film Australia documentary The Myth Makers, and later the Japan Prize-awarded TV Open Learning series Images of Australia,(Australian Broadcasting Corporation), Dawson opened up debate in the 1990s on national identity and the interconnected effects of literature, painting, cartooning, film, propaganda and the arts to constructing and projecting national self-images. This work later translated into many national university programs as well as several national TV series, on SBS (Special Broadcasting Service) and the ABC (Australian Broadcasting Corporation) following up the intellectual leads sketched in all his earlier work as a teacher and film maker.

At Griffith University, after eight years as Vice Chair of the School of Humanities, he helped plan and then headed up the multi campus Film School (now the Griffith Film School, serving as the School's Foundation Chair and associate professor until his retirement in 2000.

From 1972 he had also been a film reviewer for the ABC and occasionally commercial and radio and TV, hosting his own Film TV programme, Cuts, on ABC TV Queensland from 1975. A remarkable number of his students are now active in Universities from the Sorbonne to UCLA and work in the film industry worldwide.

After retiring to Tasmania, Dawson created a radio film chat show on ABC Radio with Tim Cox as well as writing for the ABC website and contributing popular weekly podcasts on film and popular culture. As Honorary Research Associate at the University of Tasmania he also introduced contemporary cinema studies courses.

He continued to give many public lectures, addressing the Royal Australian Institute of Architects annual awards as Keynote Speaker (2004) on film and architecture as well as creating a series of new adult education courses on screenwriting and contemporary film. In association with Screen Tasmania and The State Cinema he has curated and lectured on film theory and history, hosting movie seasons with themes from Independent Movies to new French Film, Australian Film and Documentary. His regular audiences for these short lecture/film screenings include government ministers, department heads and many film professionals. He also wrote a weekly popular culture column (2002–05) and contributes regular book reviews to the Hobart Mercury and contributes key essays, Metro, Screen Education and for the online journal sensesofcinema , voted (2007) by The Times as the world's finest international online film journal and contributing major essays to the Dartmouth Medal award-winning Concise Encyclopedia of the Documentary Film by Ian Aitken, Routledge/Taylor & Francis (2006) . In November 2009, he was elected an Honorary Life Member of the Australian Cinematographer's Society .

Since 2009, Dawson had acted as Script Editor for short drama and documentary film projects such as Daughter of San Domenico and Tin Man for Wide Angle Tasmania and was a member of AFCA (Australian Film Critics Association).

He had been Patron and Senior Judge of the MyState Film Festival since its inauguration in 2003.

== Feature films ==
- Final Cut, writer, 90 mins, 1980
- Ginger Meggs, director, 100 mins, 1983

== Select feature documentaries ==
- Horse on the Seventh Floor (writer/director, 1978)
- The Myth Makers (writer/director, 1980)
- The Legend of Fred Paterson (writer/director, 1996)
- No one can find little girls any more (writer/producer/director, 1998)

== Books ==
- Media Production (1974) Melbourne: Thomas Nelson. ISBN 0-17-004978-7
- Queensland Images (1990) Brisbane: University of Queensland Press. ISBN 0-7022-2331-X
- Screenwriting: a Manual (2000; repr: 2001) Melbourne: Oxford University Press. ISBN 0-19-550832-7
