= Stephen Hopkins (director) =

British film and television director

- Born: Jamaica
- Occupations: Film director, television director, producer

Stephen Hopkins is a Jamaican-born British director and producer of film and television. He directed A Nightmare on Elm Street 5: The Dream Child, Predator 2, Blown Away, The Ghost and the Darkness, Lost in Space, Under Suspicion, and The Life and Death of Peter Sellers. He also produced and directed several episodes of the first season of 24.

== Life and career ==
Hopkins was born in Jamaica and grew up in the United States and England, arriving in England in the 1960s. He had aspirations to be a comic book artist but said, "I wasn’t really good enough I don’t think or wasn’t applied enough and it was a lonely job". He began doing story boards for rock videos for artists such as Duran Duran and became a designer for directors like Russell Mulcahy, David Mallett, Brian Grant and Steve Barron before he moved into directing videos himself.

Hopkins moved to New York to work, then to Australia direct videos for Elton John such as "Sad Songs". He made other rock videos and commercials in Australia for clients such as Pizza Hut and David Jones as well as directing a $3 million rock musical, Rasputin.

Russell Mulcahy invited Hopkins to direct second unit on Highlander and he directed concert films for artists such as Mick Jagger. He lived in Australia for six years.

=== Film ===
In Australia Hopkins made Dangerous Game (1987). He said it "was seen in Cannes by a bunch of Hollywood people" and helped him get the job directing A Nightmare on Elm Street 5: The Dream Child. Hopkins later said, "I went at it like a dog, and had a wild, fun time. But when I look back, I think I'm the luckiest guy in the world because I don't understand how it all happened".

He went on to make Predator 2, of which he said, "I'm pretty immature, really, so it was kind of a laugh". He followed it with Judgment Night ("a real, absolute, total bomb" according to Hopkins), Blown Away ("made a lot of mistakes") and The Ghost and the Darkness ("It was a mess. I haven't been able to watch it".).

In 2016, Hopkins directed Race, a biopic about athlete Jesse Owens for Focus Features. Stephan James plays Jesse Owens, opposite Jason Sudeikis and Jeremy Irons. The film was released in February 2016.

Hopkins said that after Predator 2, he "looked around for a good film for a long time, and I couldn't get anything I wanted to do... I didn't realise the Hollywood trick. In American action movies, people get shot to death and their arms are blown off, and they get up and they're fine. These films are supposed to be fun things that people can laugh at. I always thought, 'That's wrong, that's not what violence is like'. I took these films too seriously and tried to add profound depths, and that's not what's wanted. You either do that film or you do the other one, but I kept mixing the two up, and probably unsuccessfully'".

=== Television ===
Hopkins has directed a number of episodes for television. He was a co-executive producer for the first season of the Fox action drama 24, and also directed half of the season's episodes, including the first and last episodes. He is also co-executive producer on 24: Legacy, and director of the show's pilot episode. Hopkins has also directed a number of episodes of Showtime's series House of Lies starring Don Cheadle which premiered on 8 January 2012. He is also a producer on the series.

In 2004, Hopkins directed the controversial biographical film The Life and Death of Peter Sellers, which was broadcast by HBO in the United States but received a theatrical release in a number of countries. The film provoked the ire of the actor's son Michael Sellers and won an Emmy Award for Outstanding Directing for a Miniseries, Movie or a Dramatic Special.

in 2019, Hopkins directed the pilot episode for a potential The Dark Tower series for Amazon. However, Amazon passed on the series.

In 2023, Hopkins directed the six-episode globetrotting spy thriller Liaison starring Vincent Cassel and Eva Green. He was also a producer on the series.

== Filmography ==
=== Film ===
Year	Title	Functioned as			Notes
Year	Title	Director	Producer	Writer	Notes
1986	Highlander	2nd unit	No	No	2nd unit director: UK
1987	Dangerous Game	Yes	No	Yes	
1989	A Nightmare on Elm Street 5: The Dream Child	Yes	No	No	
1990	Predator 2	Yes	No	No	
1993	Judgment Night	Yes	No	No	
1994	Blown Away	Yes	No	No	
1996	The Ghost and the Darkness	Yes	No	No	
1998	Lost in Space	Yes	Yes	No	
1999	Tube Tales	Yes	Yes	Yes	Segment "Horny"
2000	Under Suspicion	Yes	Yes	No	
2004	The Life and Death of Peter Sellers	Yes	No	No	
2007	The Reaping	Yes	No	No	
2016	Race	Yes	Yes	No	

==== Producer only ====
- Seberg (2019)

=== Television ===
Year	Title	Functioned as		Notes
Year	Title	Director	Executive Producer	Notes
1991-94	Tales from the Crypt	Yes	No	3 episodes
2001-02	24	Yes	Co-executive	13 episodes
2007-13	Californication	Yes	Yes	3 episodes
2009	The Unusuals	Yes	Yes	Episode "Pilot"
2009	In Plain Sight	Yes	No	Episode "Gilted Lily"
2011	Shameless	Yes	No	Episode "Aunt Ginger"
2012-14	House of Lies	Yes	Yes	24 episodes
2016-17	24: Legacy	Yes	Yes	3 episodes
2019	The Dark Tower	Yes	Yes	Unsold pilot
2020	The Fugitive	Yes	No	14 episodes
2023	Liaison	Yes	Yes	6 episodes

==== Miniseries ====
Year	Title	Functioned as		Notes
Year	Title	Director	Executive Producer	Notes
2004	Traffic	Yes	Yes	Co-directed with Eric Bross
2010	Thorne	Yes	Yes	3 episodes
2016	Houdini & Doyle	Yes	Yes	Episodes "The Maggie's Redress" and "A Dish of Adharma"

== Awards and nominations ==
=== Cannes Film Festival ===
Year	Work	Category	Result
2004	The Life and Death of Peter Sellers	Palme d'Or	Nominated

=== Directors Guild of America ===
Year	Work	Category	Result
2001	24	Outstanding Directorial Achievement in Dramatic Series	Nominated
2004	The Life and Death of Peter Sellers	Outstanding Directorial Achievement in Movies for Television	Nominated

=== Fantasporto ===
Year	Work	Category	Result
1989	A Nightmare on Elm Street 5: The Dream Child	Critics Award	Nominated
1989	A Nightmare on Elm Street 5: The Dream Child	Best Film	Nominated
1990	Predator 2	Best Film	Nominated

=== Gemini Awards ===
Year	Work	Category	Result
2010	Thorne	Best Direction in a Dramatic Program or Miniseries	Won

=== Primetime Emmy Awards ===
Year	Work	Category	Result
2002	24	Outstanding Directing for a Drama Series	Nominated
2002	24	Outstanding Drama Series	Nominated
2004	Traffic	Outstanding Miniseries or Movie	Nominated
2004	The Life and Death of Peter Sellers	Outstanding Directing for a Miniseries, Movie or a Dramatic Special	Won
