= Dangerous Game (1987 film) =

- Theatrical release poster
- Directed by: Stephen Hopkins
- Screenplay by: Peter West
- Produced by: Basil Appleby; Judith West
- Starring: Miles Buchanan; Marcus Graham; Steven Grives; Kathryn Walker; Sandie Lillingston; John Polson
- Cinematography: Peter Levy
- Edited by: Tim Wellburn
- Music by: Steve Ball; Les Gock
- Release date: March 1987
- Running time: 98 minutes
- Country: Australia
- Language: English
- Budget: A$4.7 million
- Box office: A$31,802 (Australia)

Dangerous Game is a 1987 (Note: many film reference books and online databases list the film's year as 1988) Australian slasher film directed by Stephen Hopkins.

The film received a limited release but, in Hopkins' words, "was seen in Cannes by a bunch of Hollywood people" and "was quite a big sort of stylish action film on a small budget" and led to Hopkins being offered the jobs of directing Nightmare on Elm Street Part 5 and Predator 2.

== Plot ==
Jack Hayward (Marcus Graham) is a computer hacker who breaks into a department store one night with his friends for thrills. They are soon locked in by former cop, turned security guard, Patrick Murphy (Steven Grives) who had recently been suspended from his job because of Jack and his friends. This cat-and-mouse game becomes a fight for survival when Tony (John Polson), one of Jack's friends, is murdered by Murphy, and his friends are next.

== Cast ==
- Miles Buchanan as David
- Marcus Graham as Jack
- Steven Grives as Patrick Murphy
- Kathryn Walker as Kathryn
- Sandie Lillingston as Ziggy
- John Polson as Tony

== Production ==
Filming took place in October 1987.

The set built by Igor Nay was one of the largest ever built for an Australian film.

== Reception ==
The film was made in 1987 but not released in Australian theatres until March 1990, by which time Hopkings had made Nightmare on Elm Street Part 5.

According to Stephen Hopkins, the film sold well at Cannes because "at that time it was quite cool to be Australian."

=== Critical ===
The Age felt "its virtues far outeweighed its flaws."

"Vern" wrote "the characters are likable, the cinematography is excellent, the filmatism is strong, there are some good action parts and the villain is multi-layered and interesting."

Eugene Kane of the Milwaukee Journal Sentinel wrote "Well, despite the intriguing setup, an engaging cast and some creative stunt work, "A Dangerous Game" has a leaky premise through which all credibility drains away."

The Toronto Star's capsule review gave it 4 stars saying "the characters are likeable, the tension is well-handled and the whole thing is beautifully filmed by director Hopkins,".

=== Accolades ===
Award	Category	Subject	Result
AACTA Awards (1987 AFI Awards)	Best Sound	Peter Fenton	Nominated
AACTA Awards (1987 AFI Awards)	Best Sound	Phil Heywood	Nominated
AACTA Awards (1987 AFI Awards)	Best Sound	Martin Oswin	Nominated
AACTA Awards (1987 AFI Awards)	Best Production Design	Igor Nay	Nominated
