= Over There (Australian TV series) =

- Genre: Drama
- Written by: Colin Free
- Country of origin: Australia
- No. of seasons: 1
- No. of episodes: 26

Production
- Executive producer: Eric Tayler
- Running time: 60 minutes

Original release
- Network: ABC
- Release: 1972 – 1973

Over There is an Australian television drama adventure series which first screened on the ABC in 1972 to 1973.

== Premise ==
Three members of the Kirby family from a small New South Wales country town serve with the Australian Army during World War II.

== Cast ==
=== Main cast ===
- Judy Morris as Elizabeth Kirby
- John Meillon as Cyril Kirby
- John Hargreaves as Robert Kirby

=== Recurring ===
- Anne Haddy (6 episodes)
- Ben Gabriel as Pop (8 episodes)
- Lyn James (3 episodes)
- Nigel Lovell as Captain Balfour (5 episodes)
- Peter Sumner as Lieutenant Alison (4 episodes)
- Richard Lupino (4 episodes)

=== Guests ===
- Danny Adcock (2 episodes)
- Garry McDonald (2 episodes)
- Jack Thompson as Corporal Harry Logan (2 episodes)
- Ken Goodlet (1 episode)
- Max Cullen (1 episode)
- Nick Tate (1 episode)
- Rod Mullinar as Tom Bowden (1 episode)
- Ron Graham (2 episodes)
- Serge Lazareff (1 episode)

== Episodes ==
1. A Long Way from the Junction
2. Just to Get the Feeling
3. Snowy Parker Would Be Proud of Me
4. The Making of NX11358
5. The Lord Sends the Food and the Devil Sends the Cook
6. Billy the Pig
7. Five Pounds and 28 Days in the Glass House
8. Touch of the Sun
9. The 100-Mill Girl
10. Something Must Be Wrong with Me
11. Champagne Charlie Is Me Name
12. Botticelli’s Widow
13. Among My Souvenirs
14. Hostilities Have Broken Out
15. Overload
16. Enemies
17. Keep in Touch
18. The Good Soldier
19. Onslaught
20. Fellow Travellers
21. Bodies and Souls
22. Mother Knows Best
23. Over the Fence Is Out
24. The Hounds of Crete
25. Spent Force
