= The Clinic (1982 film) =

- Directed by: David Stevens
- Written by: Greg Millin
- Produced by: Robert Le Tet; Bob Weis
- Starring: Chris Haywood; Simon Burke; Gerda Nicolson
- Cinematography: Ian Baker
- Edited by: Edward McQueen-Mason
- Music by: Red Symons
- Production companies: Generations Films; The Film House
- Distributed by: Roadshow Film Distributors
- Release dates: 17 September 1982 (Toronto Film Festival); 21 April 1983 (Australia)
- Running time: 93 minutes
- Country: Australia
- Language: English
- Budget: A$1 million
- Box office: AU $414,000

The Clinic is a 1982 Australian comedy film produced by Robert Le Tet and Bob Weis and directed by David Stevens. The film is a comedy/drama describing a day in a Melbourne VD clinic focusing on four doctors and their patients. It was distributed by Roadshow Film Distributors.

== Plot ==
Medical student Paul Armstrong (Simon Burke) arrives at a busy Melbourne VD clinic to study the work of the specialists there. Over the course of his visit, the strait-laced Paul encounters a diverse array of patients including gay man Charlie (Geoff Parry), middle-class woman Nancy (Veronica Lang), Carl (Martin Sharman), who has contracted a sexual disease after cheating on his fiancée, and Warwick (Ned Lander), who has lost his job due to contracting a disease.

== Cast ==
- Chris Haywood as Dr. Eric Linden
- Simon Burke as Paul
- Gerda Nicolson as Linda
- Rona McLeod as Dr. Carol Young
- Suzanne Roylance as Patty
- Veronica Lang as Nancy
- Pat Evison as Alda
- Max Bruch as Hassad
- Gabrielle Hartley as Gillian
- Jane Clifton as Sharon
- Geoff Parry as Charlie
- Martin Sharman as Carl
- Ned Lander as Warwick
- Tommy Dysart as Patient
- Alex Menglet
- Mike Bishop

== Filming locations ==
The Clinic was filmed in Melbourne and Deniliquin, Australia. Seabrook House was used as the location of the fictional clinic at 573 Lonsdale Street, in Melbourne.

== Award nominations ==
In 1983 the film received two AFI Award nominations – for Best Actress in a Supporting Role (Pat Evison) and Best Original Screenplay (Greg Millin).

== Box office ==
The Clinic grossed $414,000 at the box office in Australia, which is equivalent to $1,092,960 in 2009 dollars.

== See also ==
- Cinema of Australia
