= The Mismatch =

- Written by: Barry Donnelly
- Directed by: Ken Hannam
- Starring: Jane Harders
- Country of origin: Australia
- Original language: English

Production
- Producer: Eric Taylor
- Running time: 70 mins
- Production company: ABC

Original release
- Network: ABC
- Release: 21 October 1979

The Mismatch is a 1979 Australian television film about a separated couple. It screened on the ABC as part of a Season of Plays. Others in the series included:

- Burn the Butterflies
- Gail
- Money in the Bank
- The Rook Pool
- Banana Bender.

== Premise ==
Marsha and Richard Harrington have separated but agree that Richard should move back home for the sake of their two daughters (he is an actor, she is a teacher). Their plans to lead separate lives proves difficult. She starts dating school teacher Courtney, he starts dating his producer's wife. Courtney is revealed to be corrupt and the wife has Richard fired from his series. Richard and Marsha eventually reconcile.

== Cast ==
- Jane Harders
- Stephen O'Rourke
- Margo Lee
- Michael Aitkens
- Alfred Bell
- John Bluthal
- Michael Caulfield
- Jennifer Claire
- Nerida Clark
- Bronwyn Clarke
- George Shevtsov
