= Weekend of Shadows =

- Directed by: Tom Jeffrey
- Written by: Peter Yeldham
- Based on: 1963 novel The Reckoning by Hugh Atkinson
- Produced by: Matt Carroll
- Starring: John Waters
- Edited by: Rod Adamson
- Music by: Charles Marawood
- Production company: South Australian Film Corporation
- Release date: 12 April 1978
- Country: Australia
- Language: English
- Budget: A$495,000
- Box office: A$61,000 (Australia)

Weekend of Shadows is a 1978 film directed by Tom Jeffrey and starring John Waters.

== Premise ==
In the 1930s, a farmer's wife in a small town is murdered. Suspicion falls on a Polish labourer and a posse is formed to catch him.

== Cast ==
- John Waters as Rabbit
- Melissa Jaffer as Vi
- Wynn Roberts as Sergeant Caxton
- Graham Rouse as Ab Nolan
- Graeme Blundell as Bernie Collins
- Bill Hunter as Bosun
- Bryan Brown as Bennett
- Kevin Miles as The Superintendent
- Kit Taylor as Ryan
- Les Foxcroft as Badger

== Production ==
Writer Peter Yeldham later called the film a "real disaster... we had constant changes and insecurity about it, right up to the day of shooting. I think many of these changes didn't help the film."

Shooting commenced in July 1977 in Macclesfield in the Adelaide Hills. The film was a commercial disappointment. Director Tom Jeffrey:

I screened the film to Hugh Atkinson, the writer of the novel, after we had finished it and he came up to me afterwards and I remember him saying quite clearly, "You've got it." I said, "What do you mean?" He said, "You understand the ending." And I still didn't know whether I had it right, whether I was on his wavelength, and I said, "Please explain, Hugh." And he said, "It's about the Crucifixion." And I said, "Yes, well, I didn't really realise that, but if you can see that in the ending and if that's what your original intention was and I've unwittingly achieved that for you, I'm very pleased.".. The film was actually looking at the power of the group and how it can get out of hand.
