= The Odd Angry Shot =

1979 film by Tom Jeffrey

- Theatrical release poster
- Directed by: Tom Jeffrey
- Written by: Tom Jeffrey
- Based on: The Odd Angry Shot by William Nagle
- Produced by: Tom Jeffrey; Sue Milliken
- Starring: Graham Kennedy; Bryan Brown; John Hargreaves; John Jarratt; Graeme Blundell; Ian Gilmour; Richard Moir; Sharon Higgins
- Cinematography: Donald McAlpine
- Edited by: Brian Kavanagh
- Music by: Michael Carlos
- Production companies: Samson Production; Australian Film Commission; New South Wales Film Corporation
- Distributed by: Roadshow Film Distributors
- Release date: 1 March 1979
- Running time: 92 minutes
- Country: Australia
- Language: English
- Budget: A$600,000
- Box office: A$866,000 (Australia)

The Odd Angry Shot is a 1979 Australian war film written, directed and produced by Tom Jeffrey (with Sue Millikin). It is based on the book of the same title by William Nagle, and follows the experiences of Australian soldiers during the Vietnam War. The movie, which was shot on location in New South Wales and Canungra, Queensland, traces the tour of duty of an Australian Special Air Service Regiment reconnaissance team from their departure to their return home to Australia. It avoids much of the political comment on Australia’s involvement in Vietnam, unlike Hollywood films which tend to explore the rights and wrongs of the Vietnam War.

The film focuses on the soldiers in their cantonments away from the battlefield, where they spend the bulk of their time playing cards, smoking, drinking beer, nursing their tinea, making jokes and messing about with American forces. The film also contains some small scale battle scenes. When the men return to Australia, they reflect on how both they and the general Australian society have changed. (In particular, they find it unwise to disclose that they fought in Vietnam: to do so invited abuse in a society divided about whether Australians should have been sent to fight there.) (See Australia in the Vietnam War)

The film was sold to several countries including the US, Denmark, Finland, Germany, Norway and Greece.

== Plot ==
Bill, a young new recruit in the Australian Special Air Service, arrives for his year-long tour of duty in Vietnam. Other members of his section include Harry, the section's Corporal and the oldest and most worldly-wise of the group, along with Bung, Rogers, Dawson and Scott. The close-knit group cope with their circumstances with a mixture of humour, cheek, practical jokes and copious quantities of beer. Harry has an ongoing verbal feud with the squadron cook over the questionable quality of the food. During the first weeks of their stay in Vietnam, their biggest enemies are mud, boredom, tinea and the never-ending torrential rains. However the real war strikes suddenly one night when an enemy mortar barrage hits their camp, causing a number of casualties. The patrols first operation takes place shortly afterwards; a short sharp engagement in the dense jungle, which leaves Scott mortally wounded and one wounded Viet Cong who escapes. This encounter sets the tone for the remainder of their tour. Long, exhausting patrols which are periodically interrupted by short savage encounters with either the enemy, mines or booby-traps.

Back at camp, the men resort to anything to pass the time and keep fear and grief at bay, including drunken brawls, a practical joke on the padre and an insect-fighting contest with an American unit that degenerates into a massive fist fight. Bill receives a thinly-disguised break-up letter from his girlfriend back home. Whilst on leave in Saigon, Bung catches a young scam artist who has just robbed a pair of US soldiers. They take the boy's stolen cash and team up with the Americans for a wild night with hookers, in which even Bill indulges.

During a quiet spell at camp, Harry confides in his mates that prior to joining the army, he used to be a professional artist and had suffered a painful marriage break-up. He also grows increasingly cynical about both the conduct and purpose of the war and remarks bitterly about the lack of gratitude and interest they will receive upon returning home. Bung is devastated by news from Australia that his mother and girlfriend have perished in a car accident. Soon after Rogers steps on a mine whilst on patrol that blows off both his feet and destroys his jaw. Later his mates visit him in hospital before he is sent home. Rogers asks Harry to check if his testicles are still present (they are).

Shortly before their tour ends, a major offensive is launched and the section is sent into action to capture a VC-held bridge. Bung is killed by a VC machine-gunner as they take the bridge. The section is then ordered to withdraw, prompting Harry to comment bitterly that the whole morning's work had been for nothing. Not long afterwards, Harry, Bill and Dawson are informed they are being sent home. Back in Australia, Harry and Bill have a beer at a harbour side pub in Watsons Bay. The barman asks them if they have just returned from Vietnam but Harry replies with a highly significant 'No'. (Returning Vietnam vets were met with hostility by the Australian public). The two men look out across Port Jackson reflecting on their experiences as the film ends.

== Cast ==
- Graham Kennedy as Harry
- John Hargreaves as Bung
- John Jarratt as Bill
- Bryan Brown as Rogers
- Graeme Blundell as Dawson
- Richard Moir as Medic
- Ian Gilmour as Scott
- Graham Rouse as Cook
- John Allen as Lt. Golonka
- Tony Barry as Black Ronnie
- Brandon Burke as Isaacs
- John Fitzgerald as Intelligence Corporal
- Mike Harris as Sergeant Major
- Johnny Garfield as Padre
- Ray Meagher as Range Corporal
- Frankie J. Holden as Spotted Soldier
- Roger Newcombe as Clifford
- Brian Evis as Mayberry
- Rose Ricketts as Nurse
- Chuck McKinney as First Marine
- Freddie Paris as Second Marine
- Sharon Higgins as Bill's Girl
- Joy Westmore as Bill's Mum
- Brian Wenzel as Bill's Dad
- Ned Manning as John
- Brian Anderson as Barman
- Sarah Lee as Bar Girl
- Max Cullen as Warrant Officer
- Tim Page as P.O. Corporal
- Tim Burns as Guest at Party
- Harold Hopkins as Guest at Party
- Ron Wilson as Guest at Party

== Production ==
Finance for the movie was raised through the Australian Film Commission and the New South Wales Film Corporation.

=== Filming ===
Shooting started in July 1978 and went for three weeks. The Australian Defence Force gave filmmakers their full co-operation including providing the Army's Land Warfare Centre at Canungra as the main location. For instance the Iroquois ('Huey') helicopters scene in the film were from 9 Squadron, RAAF. This unit and the helicopters had all served in combat during the Vietnam War.

=== Locations ===
Some scenes of the movie was filmed at the Australian Army's Jungle Warfare Training Centre in Canungra, Queensland. Other scenes were filmed at the Anzac Rifle Range in Malabar, Sydney. All Australian soldiers - including draftees - who were to be deployed to Vietnam went through four weeks' specialised training in Canungra. The Boeing 707 departure scene was filmed at the rear of Hangar 131 at the Qantas Jet Base at Sydney Airport.

== Reception ==
The Odd Angry Shot grossed $866,000 at the box office in Australia, which is equivalent to $5.3 million in 2026 dollars. Tom Jeffrey:

When it came out, it wasn't well received by some reviewers because they felt we should have been critical of Australia's participation in the Vietnam War, that we didn't show much of the other side - we didn't show Vietnamese people being killed with napalm bombs and all that sort of stuff. Well, my answer to them at the time was that it wasn't that kind of film. Our intention was to show how the men survived in that environment.

According to Jeffrey the film made a profit.

== See also ==
- Cinema of Australia
