= Quartet (Australian TV series) =

- Genre: anthology
- Written by: Michael Jenkins; Brian Bell
- Country of origin: Australia
- Original language: English
- No. of seasons: 1
- No. of episodes: 4

Production
- Producer: Brian Bell
- Production location: Sydney
- Running time: 30 minutes
- Production company: ABC

Original release
- Network: ABC
- Release: May 31 – June 21, 1972

Quartet is an anthology television series that originally aired on ABC on 31 May 1972. The series consisted of four stand alone episodes, all of which were written by Michael Jenkins and Brian Bell. The series was produced for the Australian Broadcasting Corporation in their Sydney studios.

It followed another anthology series, A Time for Love.

== Cast ==
- Jane Harders
- Shane Porteous
- Helen Morse
- Serge Lazareff as Marlon
- Don Barkham
- Kate Fitzpatrick
- Brian James as Geoffrey
- Jessica Noad as Louise
- Sheila Helpman
- Neva Carr Glyn
- Graham Rouse
- Maggie Ohlbeck

== Episodes ==
No.	Title	Directed by	Written by	Original release date
1	"Jane Courtney, That's Who"	—	Michael Jenkins, Brian Bell	31 May 1972
2	"The Last Great Journey"	—	Michael Jenkins, Brian Bell	7 June 1972
3	"Naked Figure on a Park Bench"	—	Michael Jenkins, Brian Bell	14 June 1972
Ninian Wade, owner of an ad agency, uses their skill to manipulate.
4	"Geoffrey and Louise"	—	Michael Jenkins, Brian Bell	21 June 1972

Episodes aired a week later in Melbourne.

== Reception ==
The Age's Teletopics column praised Jane Harders' acting in the first episode but called the story "flimsy". John Pinkney of The Age, commenting on the first two episodes, praised the scripting, production and the technical work but criticised some of the acting, stating "too many actors continue to bray their roles... to offer up Mo McCackie caricatures instead of performances." Also in The Age, Pat Dreverman gave a mixed review to "The Last Great Journey", writing "The main faults I fear were in the script – some dreadfully corny lines more suited to the music hall." In The Bulletin, Don Anderson gave it a mixed review, stating "While there are some blatant gaucheries in the programs that might well embarrass the ABC, there are quiet strengths, particularly acting strengths that make two of them worth viewing."
