= Final Cut (1980 film) =

- Film poster
- Directed by: Ross Dimsey
- Written by: Jonathan Dawson; Ross Dimsey
- Based on: an original idea by Jonathan Dawson
- Produced by: Mike Williams executive Frank Gardiner
- Starring: Lou Brown; David Clendinning; Jennifer Cluff; Narelle Johnson
- Cinematography: Ron Johanson
- Production company: Wilgar Productions
- Distributed by: Greater Union
- Release date: 17 October 1980
- Running time: 81 minutes
- Country: Australia
- Language: English

Final Cut is a 1980 Australian thriller film directed by Ross Dimsey. It was the first movie funded by the Queensland Film Corporation, who provided half the budget. The Australian Film Commission and private investment provided the rest of the finance. It was originally envisioned as a tele movie but then developed into a feature.

It was shot at Surfers' Paradise.

== Premise ==
Cameraman Chris and his girlfriend Sarah are making a documentary about a music promoter, Dominic. They accompany him on his yacht where he is holding a party. During the party a model is killed and Dominic worries that Chris and Sarah may have filmed it.

Dominic invites Chris and Sarah to his luxury penthouse. Violent games ensue, some involving Dominic's mistress Yvette.

== Cast ==
- Lou Brown as Chris
- David Clendinning as Dominic
- Jennifer Cluff as Sarah
- Narelle Johnson as Yvette
- Thaddeus Smith as Mick
- Christine Broadway
- Robyn Bishop
- Bob Lemmon
- Julie Teale
