= Decadence (film) =

1994 British film by Steven Berkoff

- Theatrical release poster
- Directed by: Steven Berkoff
- Written by: Steven Berkoff
- Produced by: Christoph Hahnheiser
- Starring: Joan Collins; Steven Berkoff
- Production company: DeLux Productions S.A.
- Release date: 28 January 1994
- Country: United Kingdom
- Language: English

Decadence is a 1994 British comedy drama film written and directed by Steven Berkoff and starring Berkoff and Joan Collins. It is based on Berkoff's 1981 play of the same name.

== Plot ==
Two couples, representing the upper and lower ends of the British social classes, are having affaires. Lower-class Steve with Belgravia socialite Helen; and his nouveau riche wife Sybil with working-class Les, a private detective she has hired to kill her husband.

== Cast ==
- Steven Berkoff as Steve/Les/Helen's couturier
- Joan Collins as Helen/Sybil
- Christopher Biggins as the entourage
- Michael Winner as the entourage
- Marc Sinden as the entourage
- Edward Duke as the entourage
- Robert Longden as the entourage
- David Alder as the entourage
- Tim Dry as the entourage
- Imogen Bain as the entourage
- Susannah Morley as the entourage
- Ursula Smith as the entourage
- Veronica Lang as the entourage
- Matilda Ziegler as the entourage
- Terence Beesley as Giovanni
- Maggie Parke as waitress
- Denise Evans as housemaid
- Peter Brennan as old retainer
- Anthony Glover as butler
- Brendan Morgan as valet
- Jill Mercedes as maid
- Itamar Erez as piano player
- Clara Fischer as angry motorist
- Bernd Kaurisch as dancing waiter
- Martin Hirner as dancing waiter
- Enrico Tedde as dancing waiter
- Peter Dietrich as dancing waiter
- Mikel Aristegni as dancing waiter

== Production ==
It was filmed entirely in Luxembourg.

== Critical reception ==
Variety wrote:

Actor/playwright Steven Berkoff's own film of his stage play Decadence is a ripe, belching, heaving, power-drill satire of 1980s Thatcherite Britain that's as full of excesses as the passe targets it parodies. Essentially a two-hander, with Berkoff himself and Joan Collins in multiple roles, pic has some fine moments but finally sinks under the weight of its own ego. Brit legit bad-boy Berkoff looks set for a B.O. clunker here.

Stella Bruzzi wrote in Sight and Sound:

Berkoff's style is gross, grandiose and expressionistic. His intention is to offend and appal with this vision of the tasteless classes making spectacles of themselves. However, it takes a while to get into Decadence as a film because the rhythmic verse Berkoff uses, the monologues to camera and the frozen tableaux are techniques better suited to the artificiality of theatre than to film, which rarely includes such verbal extravagances. ... The success of such an excessive style depends largely on the performances, and Decadence principally works because of Berkoff himself. He always has been and will most likely remain the performer most capable of realising his own idiosyncratic brand of physical acting appears inappropriately maniacal playing more traditional villains opposite Rambo, James Bond and the Krays as if the films were big enough to contain his violent caricatures. When interpreting his own material, the phrase 'tour de force' springs inevitably to mind.
