= William Nagle (author) =

- Born: 4 June 1947; Bacchus Marsh, Victoria, Australia
- Died: 5 March 2002 (aged 54); Los Angeles, California, US
- Military career
- Branch: Australian Army
- Service years: 1964-1968
- Rank: Private
- Service number: 38359
- Unit: 3 Sqdn SAS
- Conflicts: Vietnam War
- Awards: Vietnam Medal, Vietnam Campaign Medal
- Other work: Soldier; author; actor; screenwriter

William Lawrence Nagle (4 June 1947 – 5 March 2002) was an Australian soldier, author, actor, and screenwriter. His first book, The Odd Angry Shot, written after his return from the Vietnam War and exit from the army, traced the lives of a group of Australian soldiers from their departure from Australia, their rotation in South Vietnam, and return to Australia. The book was made into a movie of the same name released in 1979.

== Military service ==
Nagle enlisted in the Australian Regular Army on 31 August 1964, as Private Nagle 38359. After initial infantry training he attended the Army Basic Cooking Course in January 1965, qualifying as a cook in May 1965, and was assigned to the Australian Army Catering Corps (AACC).

In March 1966 he was reassigned to the SAS Regiment as cook. After attending the Cadre Course and qualifying in Navigation and Parachuting in April, Nagle was detached, in June 1966, to 3 SAS Squadron, deploying on 15 June from RAAF Base Richmond to Saigon, South Vietnam.

While in Vietnam, Nagle was found to have "Disobeyed a lawful command - Refused to cook egg custard", and was given fourteen days punishment and forfeiture of pay.

On 18 March 1967 Nagle returned to Australia from South Vietnam. At his request he was transferred from AACC to Royal Australian Infantry, 3 SAS, in April 1967, where he was posted as a signaller. He was discharged from the Army on 12 September 1968 at his own request.

Nagle was embittered by the war, believing that the ideological reasons for Australia’s involvement in the conflict had been fatally undermined by Australia’s dependence on an inept America’s command, the inability to trust the South Vietnamese, and the increasingly hostile backlash against the war in Australia. Writing in The Odd Angry Shot, Nagle described the infantry as, "an army of frustrated pawns, tired, wet and sold out".

== Post-military career ==
Following his discharge from the army, Nagle found work in Australian Television and included a stint of acting with the Melbourne Theatre Company.

Nagle then moved to the USA where he worked as a screen writer and film producer/director. He worked on more than 50 feature films including Death of a Soldier (for which he wrote the screenplay), A Bridge Too Far and Gandhi. Nagle also worked in theatre, including directing productions at the Royal Shakespeare Company and the National Theater of Great Britain.

== Books and screenplays ==
- The Siege of Firebase Gloria - Screenplay, with Tony Johnston. Also known as Forward Firebase Gloria. Publisher: International Film Management, 1987. Length 250 pages. Subjects: Tet Offensive, 1968. Vietnam War, 1961–1975
- The Odd Angry Shot - Book.
- Death of a Soldier - Screenplay.
