= Hotel Story =

1977 Australian television series

Hotel Story is an Australian television series made by Crawford Productions (now Crawfords Australia) for the Ten Network in 1977.

The series, intended as a replacement for The Box, was set in a luxury international hotel. The regular characters were the hotel workers and in each one-hour episode they hosted a new batch of glamorous guest-star hotel guests, and rather like a drama version of The Love Boat stories would focus on both the self-contained dramas of the passing guests and the ongoing problems of the hotel staff.

The regular cast was headed by Terence Donovan as the hotel manager, and also included Carmen Duncan, George Spartels, and American actor Richard Lawson.

The title sequence was shot on film at the then Old Melbourne Inn on Flemington Road, North Melbourne. This distinctive looking hotel building is now an accommodation hostel owned by RMIT University. Interior sequences were largely shot on video at Channel Ten's Nunawading studios, giving the series a soap opera look.

Hotel Story was cancelled before it even went to air. Originally planned to run for at least 26 episodes, the series was cancelled after only seven episodes had been produced, and before any had been broadcast. In Melbourne, ATV-0 ran full-page advertisements in newspapers on the day the first episode was shown, describing it as "The most discussed TV series produced this year", ending with "You be the judge". There was some positive feedback and while it was too late for Hotel Story itself, the concept was later revived for the series Holiday Island. Six of the seven episodes were shown in Sydney across two consecutive weeks from 27 December 1977.

In 1978 actor June Salter won a Sammy Award for Best Actress in a Single TV Performance for her guest performance in one episode. Salter played the American head of a cosmetics firm, Annabelle Lee, a lesbian. Her main co-star was Jane Harders.

Former The Box regular and Network Ten weather girl Christine Broadway also made a guest appearance in one episode. "Hotel Story" was also the debut show that future TV actress, sex symbol and animal campaigner Lynda Stoner played a guest role too.

== Cast ==
=== Main cast ===
- Terence Donovan as Hotel manager
- Carmen Duncan
- George Spartels
- Richard Lawson

=== Guest cast ===
- Chelsea Brown
- Christine Broadway as Beauty pageant contestant
- Chuck Faulkner
- Clare Binney
- Diane Craig
- Elli Maclure
- Frank Taylor
- Jane Harders
- Jon Fabian as Detective
- June Salter as Annabelle Lee
- Lynda Stoner
- Maurie Fields
- Max Meldrum
- Moya O'Sullivan
- Patsy King
- Peter Aanensen
- Peter Adams
- Rod McLennan

== See also ==
- List of television series cancelled before airing an episode
