= Peter Adams (actor) =

Australian actor (1938–1999)

- Born: Peter John Adams; 18 May 1938; Taumarunui, New Zealand
- Died: 13 December 1999 (aged 61); Melbourne, Australia
- Occupation: Actor
- Years active: 1948–1998
- Known for: Cop Shop (TV series) as Detective. Jeff Johnson; Prisoner (TV series) as Acting Governor Bob Moran; The Young Doctors (TV series) as Clarrie Baker; Number 96 as Andy Marshall.
- Spouse: Kirsty Child (m. 1968)

Peter John Adams (18 May 1938 – 13 December 1999) was a New Zealand-born actor, who started his career in his native country, before emigrating to Australia, where he became best known for his performances in television soap operas and serials, although he also worked in theatre and radio.

== Early life ==
Born in Taumarunui, King Country, North Island, New Zealand, Adams was the son of a Church of England clergyman.

== Career ==
Adams began his acting career in his native New Zealand, and first came to the attention of critics in 1948, for his singing voice. In 1954, he performed in a production of The Mikado at Kings College. In 1958, he began a two year run with the New Zealand Players Company, with performances including The Importance of Being Earnest, The Long, The Short and The Tall, What Every Woman Knows, The Corn Is Green and A Streetcar Named Desire.

He emigrated to Australia in 1960, and undertook club work and television roles, before joining the Shakespeare Company of John Alden, where he performed in Othello, Macbeth and The Merchant of Venice and Lock Up Your Daughters.

Two years later, he toured New Zealand in Woman in a Dressing Gown, after which he secured a role as an announcer for New Zealand Broadcasting Corporation for two years.

When he returned to Australia, he appeared in stage productions of Instant Marriage, Robin Hood and Sweet Charity.

Adams appeared in The Actor Who Laughed at Sydney's Community Theatre (now Marian Street Theatre). The evening of opening night, Sydney was hit by torrential rain, causing the city to grind to a halt. As the actors set out for the theatre in Killara, most were stranded, including Adams who was stuck in a train in the Wynyard tunnel. In desperation he jumped off and dangerously ran back along the tracks to the station. When all the cast eventually arrived, the audience were given a choice of either starting the performance at the late hour, or returning the next night – and chose the latter.

Adams appeared in the Australian soap opera Number 96 as Andy Marshall from 1974 to 1975 and had a five-week stint in medical soap opera The Young Doctors as comedian, Clarrie Baker in 1977.

His defining role came in 1977 when he was cast as Detective Jeff 'JJ' Johnson, a lead in the police procedural series Cop Shop. The character became a hit with audiences, winning Adams several Logie Awards. In 1980, he won Best Lead Actor in a Series and in 1981, the Silver Logie for Most Popular Actor. He left the series for a role in musical theatre, but later returned, staying until the series was cancelled in December 1983.

Adams appeared in Prisoner as the tough Acting Governor Bob Moran, for three months in 1986. It was his first long-running television role since leaving Cop Shop. He also formed his own production company TBM Productions. In 1994, he appeared in the television movie Halifax f.p. – The Feeding with Rebecca Gibney.

While predominantly known for his television roles, Adams also continued to work in theatre. In 1985, he toured Victoria appearing in Warwick Moss' two-man play Down an Alley Filled with Cats. In 1995, he directed the 1995 Geelong Lyric Theatre Society production of Les Misérables. In 1987, he appeared in the Darwin Theatre Company production of Trumpets and Raspberries.

Adams had his own radio show on Melbourne's 3AW for 18 months.

== Personal life and death ==
Adams met his first wife, Mary in New Zealand, with whom he returned to Australia after a two year stint working for NZBC.

Adams was married to actress Kirsty Child. They met while starring in stage productions of Out of the Crocodile, Arms and the Man and Gaslight at the Community Theatre in Sydney. Both Adams and Child appeared in Prisoner and missed working with each other by a matter of days, as she finished up just as he started his 13-week stint.

Adams died from cancer, aged 61, on 13 December 1999.

== Filmography ==
=== Film ===
Year	Title	Role	Notes
1973	Come Out Fighting	Garry Day	Feature film
1989	Blowing Hot and Cold	Jack Phillips	Feature film

=== Television ===
Year	Title	Role	Notes
1955	Alfred Hitchcock Presents	Tim Grady	Season 1, episode 6: "Salvage"
1961	The Outcasts		Miniseries, 1 episode
1963	Flowering Cherry		TV play
1969	Riptide	Reporter / John Barrow	2 episodes
1970	Skippy the Bush Kangaroo	Jo Bently	1 episode
1970	Delta	Bartlett	1 episode
1970	Barrier Reef	Kenneth Norris	1 episode
1971	Dynasty	Matt Dawson	1 episode
1965–1973	Homicide	Mike Evans / Tony Davis / Dr Cousins / Detective / Charlie Stevens / Gary Lloyd / Charlie Sampson	7 episodes
1970–1974	Division 4	Ken Harris / Clive Collins / Harry Jones / Kenneth O'Connell / Hinton / Ernie Callan / Arthur Bull	7 episodes
1974–1975	Number 96	Andy Marshall	68 episodes
1976	The Lost Islands	Pilot Jimmy Williams	1 episode
1976	Moynihan		1 episode
1976	King's Men		1 episode
1977	Bluey	Alex 'Kanga' Murray	1 episode
1977	The Alternative	Noel Denning	TV movie
1977	The Young Doctors	Clarrie Baker	16 episodes
1977	Bobby Dazzler	Arthur Carroll	1 episode
1977	Hotel Story		1 episode
1977	Say You Want Me		TV movie
1977–1984	Cop Shop	Detective Jeff 'J.J.' Johnson	493 episodes
1978	A Good Thing Going	Dave	TV movie
1981	Bellamy	Donald	Miniseries, 1 episode
1985	The Fast Lane	Price	1 episode
1986	Handle with Care	Geoff	TV movie
1986	Prisoner	Acting Governor Bob Moran	26 episodes
1986	Darwin, 1942: Australia's Greatest Shame	a John Barry, KC	TV movie
1987	Neighbours	Stephen Armstrong	4 episodes
1988	Australians	Mr Dutton	Miniseries, 1 episode: "Lottie Lyell"
1989	Mission: Impossible	Brian Sean McCarron	1 episode
1994–1989	A Country Practice	Ted Kagen / Alan Lang	4 episodes
1991	The Flying Doctors	Artie Blake	1 episode
1994	Halifax f.p. – The Feeding	Peter O'Hare	TV movie
1996	The Territorians	Sarge Kennedy	TV movie
1997	Medivac	Judge Benson	2 episodes
1998	Gargantua	Dr Hale	TV movie

== Theatre ==
=== As actor ===
Year	Title	Role	Notes
1954	The Mikado		King's College, Auckland
1958–1959	The Importance of Being Earnest	Lane	His Majesty's Theatre, Auckland, Wellington Opera House with New Zealand Players
1959	The Long, The Short and The Tall		His Majesty's Theatre, Auckland with New Zealand Players
1959	What Every Woman Knows		His Majesty's Theatre, Dunedin, His Majesty's Theatre, Auckland, Wellington Opera House with New Zealand Players
c.1959	The Corn Is Green		New Zealand Players
c.1959	A Streetcar Named Desire	Stanley Kowalski	New Zealand Players
	Death of a Salesman		
	The Norman Conquests	Tom	
1961	The Merchant of Venice		Cremorne Orpheum, Sydney, Elizabethan Theatre, Sydney, Conservatorium, Sydney with John Alden Shakespeare Company
1961	Othello		Cremorne Orpheum, Sydney, Elizabethan Theatre, Sydney, Conservatorium, Sydney with John Alden Shakespeare Company
1961	Macbeth		Cremorne Orpheum, Sydney, Elizabethan Theatre, Sydney, Conservatorium, Sydney with John Alden Shakespeare Company
1961	Lock Up Your Daughters		Palace Theatre, Sydney with John Alden Shakespeare Company
1962	The Miracle Worker	James Keller	Comedy Theatre, Melbourne with J. C. Williamson's
1963	Woman in a Dressing Gown	Willie	Comedy Theatre, Melbourne, Australia & NZ tour
1965	Instant Marriage		Tivoli Theatre, Melbourne, Tivoli Theatre, Sydney
1965–1966	Robin Hood		Tivoli Theatre, Sydney
1966	A Phoenix Too Frequent	The Landlord	St Martins Theatre, Melbourne
1966	A Bunch of Ratbags	Slaughterman	Emerald Hill Theatre, Sydney
1967	Sweet Charity	Oscar Lindquist	Her Majesty's Theatre, Sydney, Her Majesty's Theatre, Melbourne, Her Majesty's Theatre, Adelaide with J. C. Williamson's
1967	The Birthday Party	Goldberg	St Martins Theatre Company, Melbourne
c.1967	Bye Bye Birdie	Albert	Menzies, Sydney
1968	Relatively Speaking	Greg	Princess Theatre, Melbourne & Australian tour
1969	A Day in the Death of Joe Egg	Bri	Old Tote Theatre, Sydney
1969	Out of the Crocodile		Community Theatre, Sydney
1969	Arms and the Man	Bluntschli	Community Theatre, Sydney
1969	Richard III	King Richard	Community Theatre, Sydney
1969	Gaslight	Manningham	Community Theatre, Sydney
1969–1970	Man of La Mancha	Don Quixote (Cervantes) (standby)	Her Majesty's Theatre, Melbourne with J. C. Williamson's
1971	Man of La Mancha	Dr. Carrasco	
1972	Danton's Death		Russell St Theatre, Melbourne, with MTC
1972	The Chocolate Frog		Russell St Theatre, Melbourne, with MTC
1972	A Touch of the Poet		MTC
1973	Jugglers Three		Playhouse, Canberra, UNSW Parade Theatre, Sydney with MTC
1981	Same Time, Next Year	George	Alexander Theatre, Melbourne with Playbox Theatre Company & TAS/QLD tour
1984	The Removalists	Police Sergeant	Malthouse Theatre, Melbourne with Playbox Theatre Company
1985	Down an Alley Filled with Cats	Lead role	Monash University, Melbourne, VIC regional tour & interstate tour
1985–1986	Guys and Dolls	Nathan Detroit	Australian national tour
1986	The Odd Couple	Oscar Madison	St George Leagues Club, Kogarah
1987	A Chorus of Disapproval		Suncorp Theatre, Brisbane with Queensland Theatre
1987	What the Butler Saw	Dr Prentice	Sydney Opera House with Gary Penny Productions
1987	Trumpets and Raspberries		State Theatre Company of Northern Territory
	The Club		with Gateway Productions
1988	A Small Family Business		Northside Theatre
1989	Educating Rita	Frank Bryant	Phillip St Theatre, Sydney, Alexander Theatre, Melbourne with Gateway Productions
1990	The Blessed Fountain		Regal Theatre, Perth
1991	Gaslight	Rough	Theatre of Comedy
1992	Diving for Pearls	Ron	Space Theatre, Adelaide with STCSA
1992	No Going Back	Karl / Bunce	Russell St Theatre, Melbourne, with MTC
1993	Brilliant Lies	Vince	Playhouse, Adelaide with QTC / STCSA & Playhouse, Melbourne with MTC
	Forget-Me-Not Lane		MTC
1996	My Father's Father	Karl	Fairfax Studio, Melbourne with MTC
1997	The Comedy of Errors	Solinus	Playhouse, Melbourne with MTC
1999	Witness (reading)		Jewish Holocaust Museum, Melbourne
	In Duty Bound		Gateway Productions

=== As director ===
Year	Title	Role	Notes
1963	Woman in a Dressing Gown	Assistant Stage Manager	Comedy Theatre, Melbourne
1989	Educating Rita	Director	
	The Freedom of the City	Director	Australian national tour with Gateway Productions
1990	The Club	Director	St Martins Youth Theatre, Melbourne
1995	Les Misérables	Director	Geelong Lyric Theatre Society

== Awards and nominations ==
Year	Work	Award	Category	Result
1977	The Alternative	Penguin Awards	Best Actor	Won
1978	Cop Shop	Logie Awards	Best Performance by an Actor in a Supporting Role	Won
1979	Cop Shop	Penguin Awards	Best Sustained Performance by an Actor	Won
1980	Cop Shop	Logie Awards	Best Lead Actor in a Series	Won
1980	Cop Shop	Logie Awards	Silver Logie for Most Popular Actor	Won
1980	Cop Shop	Sammy Awards	Best Actor in a TV series	Won
1981	Cop Shop	Penguin Awards	Best Sustained Performance by a Series	Commendation
1986	Guys and Dolls	Green Room Awards	Best Male Lead in a Musical	Won
