= Noulie Skoumbas =

Australian television host

Noulie Skoumbas (1955-1992) was a Greek Australian TV presenter and producer with SBS.

Skoumbas was born in Katerini, Greece in 1955 and moved to Australia in 1967. In 1980 she started working for SBS in publicity after being discovered working in a sandwich shop and later became the host of Scoop. She went on to host Aegean Sounds and The Greek Variety Show. From 1990 she produced Hotline, a viewer feedback show. She died in May 1992 after a short illness.
