= Kirsty Child =

Australian actress

- Born: Australia
- Education: National Institute of Dramatic Art (1963)
- Occupation: Actress
- Years active: 1965–2015
- Known for: Roles on Prisoner; Neighbours as Carmel Taylor
- Spouse: Peter Adams (1968–1999, his death)

Kirsty Child is an Australian former character actress most notable for several roles in the television series Prisoner and Neighbours.

== Early life ==
Child studied acting at Sydney's National Institute of Dramatic Art (NIDA), graduating in 1963.

== Career ==
Child first appeared on television in several character roles in Crawford Productions' series such as Homicide. Her film roles include Country Town (1971) and the Australian film adaptation of Joan Lindsay's Picnic at Hanging Rock (1975).

In 1979, Child starred in Prisoner as Anne Yates, a prison officer turned drug dealer, for 10 episodes. She returned in 1983 as Glynis Johnson, and then again in 1985 as Willie Beecham, a prominent, 51-episode role.

She had a leading role in the drama series Inside Running in 1989 (as Beverly Lamb), along with various guest roles on television series Cop Shop and Blue Heelers.

She played Carmel Tyler in the soap opera Neighbours in 2002 and reprised the role between 2012 and 2013.

Child has also performed extensively for stage, with appearances dating from 1965, for theatre companies including Old Tote Theatre, MTC and Playbox Theatre Company.

== Personal life ==
Child is the widow of New Zealand-born Australian actor Peter Adams, who died in December 1999. Their relationship developed after starring together in stage productions of Out of the Crocodile, Arms and the Man and Gaslight, at the Community Theatre (later, Marian Street Theatre) in Sydney.

== Filmography (selected) ==
=== Film ===
Year	Title	Role	Type
1971	Country Town	Julie	Feature film
1975	Picnic at Hanging Rock	Miss Lumley	Feature film
1985	Handle with Care	Shirley	TV movie
1998	Crackers	Charge Nurse	Feature film

=== Television ===
Year	Title	Role	Notes	Ref
1965	My Brother Jack		Miniseries, episode 1.2	
1966–1972	Homicide	5 character roles		
1969-1975	Division 4	4 character roles		
1970	Catalyst		TV play	
1971–1973	Matlock Police	3 character roles		
1977–1984	Cop Shop	Various roles		
1980	Young Ramsay	Jocelyn Scott		
1981	The Patchwork Hero	Aunt Ivy		
1985	The Fast Lane	Eunice		
1986	A Fortunate Life	Mrs. Bibby	Miniseries	
1979, 1985–1986	Prisoner	Anne Yates / Glynis Johnson / Willie Beecham	65 episodes	
1989	Inside Running	Beverly Lamb		
1991–1992	Boys from the Bush	Corrie		
1992	Mother and Son	Meredith		
1992	Bligh	Nurse		
1993–2001	Blue Heelers	2 character roles	2 episodes	
2001	Halifax f.p.	Female Doctor		
2002; 2012–2013	Neighbours	Carmel Taylor	15 episodes	
2009	City Homicide	Elaine Shepparton	1 episode	
2011	Winners and Losers	Judy Mitchell	1 episode	
2014	This is Littleton	Annoyed Lady	1 episode	

== Theatre ==
Year	Title	Role	Notes	Ref
1967	And So to Bed		Playhouse, Perth	
1967	Mary, Mary		Playhouse, Perth	
1967	Julius Caesar		Playhouse, Perth	
1967	Pirates at the Barn		Playhouse, Perth	
1967	Luv		Playhouse, Perth	
1967	The Owl and the Pussy-Cat	The Pussycat	Theatre 62, Adelaide with Hole in the Wall Theatre, Perth	
1968	King Lear	A lady, attendant to Cordelia	Old Tote Theatre, Sydney, Her Majesty's Theatre, Brisbane with J. C. Williamson	
1968	You Never Can Tell		Old Tote Theatre, Sydney	
1968	This Old Man Comes Rolling Home		Old Tote Theatre, Sydney	
1969	Oh, Killara		Community Theatre, Sydney	
1969	Out of the Crocodile	Romantic lead	Community Theatre, Sydney	
1969	The Restoration of Arnold Middleton	Joan	Community Theatre, Sydney	
1969	Arms and the Man	Raina	Community Theatre, Sydney	
1969	Fallen Angels		Community Theatre, Sydney	
1969	Gaslight	Nancy	Community Theatre, Sydney	
1970	Cat Among the Pigeons		Old Tote Theatre, Sydney	
1972	Forget-Me-Not Lane		Russell St Theatre, Melbourne with MTC	
1972	Jugglers Three		Russell St Theatre, Melbourne with MTC	
1972	Father Dear Come Over Here		Russell St Theatre, Melbourne with MTC	
1980	Upside Down at the Bottom of the World	Victoria	Playbox Theatre, Melbourne	
1980	Outside Edge	Miriam	Playbox Theatre, Melbourne	
1981	Same Time, Next Year	Doris	Malthouse Theatre, Melbourne with Playbox Theatre Company & VIC/TAS tour	
1983	Woodworm		Playbox Theatre, Melbourne	
1984	The Real Thing	Charlotte	Melbourne Athenaeum with MTC	
1984	Filumena	Teresina	Melbourne Athenaeum with MTC	
1985	Blue Window		St Martins Theatre, Melbourne with Playbox Theatre Company	
1985	Little Lonsdale		Playbox Theatre, Melbourne	
	The Joss Adams Show		London	
	Don't Let Summer Come		Hole in the Wall Theatre, Perth	
1987	The Norman Conquests		Russell St Theatre, Melbourne with MTC	
1991	Morning Sacrifice	Miss Dora Pearl	Russell St Theatre, Melbourne with MTC	
2005	The Breath of Life	Frances Beale	Australian national tour with HIT Productions	
2007	Under Milk Wood	Mrs Ogmore Pritchard / Narrator / Various roles	Comedy Theatre, Melbourne	
2015	Wicked Widows		Frankston Arts Centre	
2015	The Savages of Wirramai	Mary Savage	La Mama, Melbourne with Suckerpunch Theatre	
