= Christine Broadway =

French-born television personality

Christine Broadway is a French-born television personality active in Australia in the 1970s and early 1980s.

== Career ==
=== TV acting ===
She appeared on ATV-O's The Box, the Australian versions of The Gong Show, Second Chance and Have A Go, as well as presenting weather reports on the nightly news service. Broadway later had a guest role in an episode of the short-lived series Hotel Story, playing a beauty pageant contestant.

=== Cinema ===
In cinema, Broadway appeared in the 1980 film Final Cut.

== Personal life ==
In her private life, she is married to Australian juggler Johnny Broadway and is retired living on the Gold Coast, Queensland.

== Filmography ==
Year	Title	Role	Type
1977	ATV-O	Weather presenter	
1977	The Box	Yvette Monchamps	TV series, 1 episode
1977	The Gong Show	Presenter	TV series, Australian version
1977	Second Chance	Presenter	TV series
1977	Hotel Story	Beauty pageant contestant	TV series
1980	Have A Go	Presenter	TV series
1980	Final Cut (aka Death Games)		Feature film
