= The Siege of Firebase Gloria =

1989 film directed by Brian Trenchard-Smith

- US film poster
- Directed by: Brian Trenchard-Smith
- Written by: William Nagle; Tony Johnston
- Additional dialogue by: Brian Trenchard-Smith; R. Lee Ermey
- Produced by: Howard Grigsby; Rod S.M. Confesor
- Starring: Wings Hauser; R. Lee Ermey
- Cinematography: Kevan Lind
- Edited by: Andrew Prowse
- Music by: Paul Schutze
- Production companies: Fries Entertainment; Eastern Film Management Corporation; Bancannia Entertainment; International Film Management
- Distributed by: Hoyts Distribution (Australia); Fries Entertainment (US)
- Release date: January 27, 1989
- Running time: 95 minutes
- Countries: Australia; Philippines; United States
- Languages: English; Vietnamese

The Siege of Firebase Gloria is a 1989 Australian war film directed by Brian Trenchard-Smith, starring Wings Hauser and R. Lee Ermey. It was filmed in the Philippines.

== Plot ==
At the start of the Tet Offensive, a Marine Long Range Reconnaissance unit led by Sergeant Major Bill Hafner (R. Lee Ermey) and Corporal Joseph L. Di Nardo (Wings Hauser) come upon a village where the locals have been executed gruesomely for fraternizing with the US troops. Di Nardo finds a sole survivor, a young Vietnamese child (Michael Cruz). Hafner's recon unit, which also consists of college kid Murphy and radioman Shortwave who has only 17 days left on his enlistment, exits the village and, while on patrol, come upon a Viet Cong (VC) tunnel complex where they find an American POW. Later the Marines arrive at the poorly defended firebase called Gloria. Hafner immediately takes control of the base when he discovers the commanding officer Captain Williams is a burned out drug addict and is not fit for duty.

Hafner and Di Nardo are a formidable partnership and they secure the base and motivate the other soldiers to prepare for a major offensive. Hafner encounters a photographer (Nick Nicholson) offering the men weed and immediately recruits him knowing that every man is vital to the upcoming offensive. As Hafner explores the base, he also encounters a full nursing staff which he implores to leave the base futilely. Their commanding officer Captain Flanagan (Margaret Trenchard-Smith) proves more competent than the drug addled Williams and she remains dedicated to her patients and her role on the base. Di Nardo warns her that the Vietnamese will show her and her nurses no mercy if they get into the hospital. Flanagan dismisses Di Nardo as a brute (especially after she witnesses him executing unarmed prisoners after another attack).

The Viet Cong attempt a number of attacks but Hafner manages to fend off each attack. With casualties mounting, Di Nardo starts to crack from the pressure and brutality of war. Hafner explains that Di Nardo was formerly a high ranking NCO (Non Commissioned Officer) but lost his rank after going AWOL when his son died. Di Nardo though forms a bond with the young Vietnamese child he saved from the village.

One by one Hafner's men are killed in action. An Army Air Cavalry unit led by Captain AJ Moran delivers supplies and ammunition to the base and provides air support but the Marines are surrounded and severely outnumbered. During the final attack, the medical quarters are breached and just as Di Nardo predicted, Flanagan's patients and nurses are mercilessly executed before she and another patient fend off the attack. Despite air support the base is nearly over-run by the Viet Cong. Di Nardo sees the young boy in danger and is mortally wounded trying to save the child, while the Viet Cong leader takes the child with him. Murphy and Shortwave are also killed.

Eventually, the Marines are able to repel the VC forces. However, the death toll is immense for both the Americans and the Viet Cong. Flanagan and Hafner find the badly wounded Di Nardo who says that he refuses to go home in his current condition and implores Hafner to mercy kill him.

At the conclusion of the battle, the Viet Cong commander discovers that it was never his mission gain a victory over the Americans, but to lead his men to their deaths in order to allow the North Vietnamese Army to take a more substantial role in the war. Hafner explains that during the Tet Offensive the Viet Cong lost more than 55,000 men. The Americans are subsequently forced to abandon the base, having lost too many men in the process of defending it. Hafner tearfully clutches his friend's dog tags and poignantly says "End of the story, Nard".

== Cast ==
- Wings Hauser as Corporal Joseph L. Di Nardo
- R. Lee Ermey as Sergeant Major Bill Hafner
- Robert Arevalo as Cao Van
- Mark Neely as Private Murphy
- Gary Hershberger as Captain A.J. Moran
- Clyde Jones as Coates (as Clyde R. Jones)
- Margaret Trenchard-Smith as Captain Flanagan (as Margi Gerard)
- Richard Kuhlman as 'Ghost'
- John Calvin as Commanding Officer Williams
- Albert Popwell as Sergeant Jones
- Michael Cruz as Vietnamese Child
- Erich A. Hauser as Patrol Member (as Eric Hauser)
- Guel Romero as Patrol Member
- Don Wilson as Patrol Member (as Donald Wilson)
- Nick Nicholson as Photographer

== Production ==
The Siege of Firebase Gloria was filmed on land that was contested by the New People's Army (NPA)—members of whom had been hired as security guards and extras—and Trenchard-Smith recalled that the Philippine government-owned helicopters that were to be used in battle scenes arrived half a day late, as their crews had been strafing NPA positions 100 miles north.

Drawing inspiration from his two tours of duty during the Vietnam War, Ermey co-scripted additional scenes for the film in collaboration with the director; Hauser similarly devised his own dialogue for his character's confessional scene near the climax.

According to Trenchard-Smith, he was influenced by Zulu (1964) in his approach to making the film, and that he wanted it to be about "war and reconciliation". To further this theme, the film was to be book-ended by a framing device set years after the Tet Offensive, whereby Ermey's character Sgt. Hafner encounters a Viet Cong soldier he fought against in the titular siege, eventually extending his hand to him and saying "Chào mừng" ("Welcome" in Vietnamese). These scenes were cut prior to the start of sound mixing at the behest of the film's American sales executives, one of whom the director claimed to have said the bookends and other scenes placed "too much emphasis on the gooks". As a compromise, when recording Ermey's in-character narrations, Trenchard-Smith and the actor made additions to what was scripted that emphasised the intended thematic focus.

== Release ==
Although the film was written, produced, and directed by Australians, it was not considered Australian for the AFI Awards due to its primarily American cast.
