= Don's Party (film) =

- DVD cover
- Directed by: Bruce Beresford
- Written by: David Williamson
- Produced by: Phillip Adams
- Starring: Ray Barrett; Candy Raymond; Clare Binney; Pat Bishop
- Cinematography: Donald McAlpine
- Edited by: William M. Anderson
- Production company: Double Head Productions
- Distributed by: Phillip Adams; 20th Century-Fox
- Release date: 17 November 1976
- Running time: 90 minutes
- Country: Australia
- Language: English
- Budget: AU$270,000 or $329,146
- Box office: AU$871,000 (Australia)

Don's Party is a 1976 Australian black comedy film directed by Bruce Beresford from a screenplay by David Williamson, based on Williamson's 1971 play Don's Party. John Hargreaves plays Don Henderson with Jeanie Drynan as Don's wife Kath. Ray Barrett plays Mal, Don's mentor, and Pat Bishop is his wife. Graham Kennedy plays Mack, Graeme Blundell is the Liberal supporter and Veronica Lang his obedient wife. Kerry (Candy Raymond) is the attractive and assertive artist and Evan (Kit Taylor) is her uptight and possessive partner. Cooley (Harold Hopkins) comes with his young girlfriend Susan (Clare Binney).

In the film the setting is relocated to the suburb of Westleigh (7 Windam Place) in the northern suburbs of Sydney. The film also deviates from the stage version by increasing the level of profanity and contains full frontal nudity and sex scenes.

Pat Bishop won the AFI Award for Best Actress in a Leading Role, Veronica Lang won the AFI Award for Best Actress in a Supporting Role, Bruce Beresford won the Best Direction award, David Williamson won the Best screenplay award, and the film won the edit and sound award. The film was entered into the 27th Berlin International Film Festival.

== Cast ==
- Ray Barrett as Mal, a crass former psychologist, now practising as a management consultant
- Clare Binney as Susan, Cooley's 19-year-old girlfriend, a university student
- Pat Bishop, who was awarded the Australian Film Institute (AFI) Award for Best Actress in a Leading Role, as Jenny, Mal's long-suffering wife
- Graeme Blundell as Simon, a nervous accountant for an industrial plastic company and a Liberal supporter
- Jeanie Drynan as Kath Henderson, Don's wife, co-host of the party
- John Hargreaves as Don Henderson, host of the party, schoolteacher
- Harold Hopkins as Grainger Cooley, a sex-obsessed, loud-mouthed lawyer
- Graham Kennedy as Mack, a recently separated design engineer
- Veronica Lang, who was awarded the AFI Award for Best Actress in a Supporting Role, as Jody.
- Candy Raymond as Kerry, a rude and snooty painter who has had four major art exhibitions
- Kit Taylor as Evan, Kerry's boyfriend, an uptight, socialist dentist
- John Gorton as himself (he was the incumbent Prime Minister of Australia at the election, and his party won a narrow victory) (cameo)
- Bruce Beresford as bottle shop attendant (cameo)

== Production ==
In 1973 Phillip Adams was approached to make the film by Jack Lee, who wanted to direct. At the time Adams felt that comedies were the only genre of film likely to redeem themselves financially in Australia, so he felt he would easily be able to raise finance for the movie, which he did not think would cost more than $300,000. However Adams was busy at the time working on the Australia Council, which held up his involvement for 12 months; at the end of that time, Australia was in the middle of a credit squeeze and he found it more difficult than he expected to get the money.

Problems then emerged when the director Lee wanted to make the film into a broader comedy, which made Williamson uncomfortable and Adams was worried about raising finance with Lee attached, so Lee pulled out. Adams approached Ken Hannam but he lacked sympathy for the characters and found them too aggressive. Tim Burstall and Peter Weir were approached but they also turned down the film. Eventually Adams approached Bruce Beresford, who agreed.

There was some discussion that the events of the play be updated to the 1975 Federal election, but in the end it was decided to keep the screenplay faithful to the original play as it was widely believed in 1975 that Labor would lose–which was not the case in 1969. The setting was relocated to Sydney, in part because it was felt it would be cheaper but also to ensure audiences did not feel the movie was "too Melbourne". The budget was raised from the Australian Film Commission and private investors, mainly exhibitors.

Adams wanted to cast Paul Hogan as Cooley but the actor declined. Ray Barrett had played that role in London but was considered too old to do it on film, and was given the part of Mal instead. He was changed from being an ex-student to a lecturer to allow for his age. Graeme Blundell took the role of an accountant in order to escape typecasting as Alvin Purple. (Blundell had produced the original play in 1971.) Barry Crocker was originally meant to play Don but was replaced by John Hargreaves. Hargreaves later claimed this took place at short notice when Crocker 'broke his back... the day before rehearsals'.

Shooting began in January 1976 and took roughly five weeks, using a house in Westleigh as the main location.

John Gorton played a cameo as himself as a tribute to his contribution in helping re-establish the Australian film industry.

== Box office ==
Phillip Adams originally distributed the film himself. Don's Party grossed $871,000 at the box office in Australia, which is equivalent to $4,503,070 in 2009 dollars.

David Williamson rated the film highly saying it was "very well done".

== In popular culture ==
The video clip to You Am I's 1998 single "What I Don't Know 'bout You" is a tribute to the film version of Don's Party. It features scenes from the movie re-enacted by noted Australian actors, including Stephen Curry (Mack), Ben Mendelsohn (Don), Matt Day, Tania Lacy and Nadine Garner.

== See also ==
- Cinema of Australia
