= Tom Jeffrey =

Australian film and television producer and director

Tom Jeffrey AM
- Born: Tom Morven Jeffrey; 26 September 1938 (age 87)
- Occupation(s): Film and television producer and director
- Employer(s): ABC Australia, British Broadcasting Corporation

Tom Morven Jeffrey AM (born 26 September 1938) is an Australian film and television producer and director. He worked at the ABC and BBC, becoming an ABC drama director in the late 1960s. In 1971, he became head of the Producers and Directors Guild of Australia. He was also a consultant on the Experimental Film Fund and on the Film, Radio and Television Board of the Australian Council for the Arts.

From the early 1980s he stopped directing and concentrated on producing.

Jeffrey was made a Member of the Order of Australia in the 1981 Australia Day Honours.

== Select credits ==
- Stormy Petrel (1959) (TV series) – assistant
- Crackerjack (1966) (TV series) – director
- Kain (1967) - unit manager
- This Day Tonight (1968) (current affairs TV series) – studio director
- Delta (1969) – TV series
- Pastures of the Blue Crane (1969) (TV series) – director
- The Removalists (1975) – director
- Weekend of Shadows (1978) – director
- The Odd Angry Shot (1979) – director
- The Best of Friends (1982) – producer
- Fighting Back (1982) – producer
- Going Sane (1985) – producer
