= Miles Buchanan =

Australian actor

Miles Buchanan (born 1966) is an Australian actor. He is the brother of Simone and Beth Buchanan.

He was a popular actor as a child and young man, winning a Logie award in 1979 for his performance in the TV movie A Good Thing Going. However his career was hurt by social phobia and depression. His mother wrote a book about his experiences, called The Wings of Madness.

== Filmography ==
=== Film ===
Year	Title	Role	Type
1978	A Good Thing Going	Damien Harris	TV film. Won Logie Award for Best Juvenile Performer
1978	Newsfront		Feature film
1982	Runaway Island	Jamie McLeod	TV film
1985	Bliss	David Joy	Feature film
1987	Dangerous Game	David	Feature film
1988	Fragments of War: The Story of Damien Parer	Simpson	TV film
1990	Sparks		Short film
1992	The Girl from Tomorrow	Eddie	TV film

=== Television ===
Year	Title	Role	Type
1976	The Sullivans	Samuel	TV series, 2 episodes
1979	Chopper Squad	Brendan	TV series, 1 episode
1979	Skyways	Bert Simpson	TV series, 1 episode
1979	The Mike Walsh Show	Guest host	TV series (during International Year of the Child)
1980	Young Ramsay	Nick Adams	TV series, 1 episode
1981	Cop Shop	Alan Davis	TV series, 1 episode
1980	Home Sweet Home	Tony Pacelli	TV series, 26 episodes
1980-83	Secret Valley	Miles	TV series, 11 episodes
1983	A Country Practice	Nathan Webster	TV series, 2 episodes
1983	Sons and Daughters	Darren Brooks	TV series, 11 episodes
1984	Carson's Law	Findlay Nigel	TV series, 1 episode
1994-85	Runaway Island	Jamie McLeod	TV series, 8 episodes
1985	Possession		TV series, 1 episode
1989	Rafferty's Rules	Evan Fairchilld	TV series, 1 episode
1991	G.P.	Geoff	TV series, 1 episode
1991-92	The Girl From Tomorrow	Eddie	TV series, 22 episodes

== Theatre ==
Year	Title	Role	Type
1980s	Torchsong Trilogy	David	Seymour Centre, Universal Theatre, Melbourne, Her Majesty's Theatre, Sydney, National Theatre, Melbourne
1986	Brighton Beach Memoirs	Eugene Morris Jerome	Comedy Theatre, Melbourne
1986	The Secret Diary of Adrian Mole, Aged 13¾	Adrian Mole	Melbourne Athenaeum
1987-88	Biloxi Blues	Eugene Morris Jerome	Sydney Opera House Playhouse Theatre, Suncorp Theatre, Brisbane, Bridge Theatre, Coniston
1988	Broadway Bound	Eugene Morris Jerome	Sydney Opera House, Playhouse
1989	The Marriage of Figaro	Cherubin	Wharf Theatre
1989	A Midsummer Night's Dream		Sydney Opera House Drama Theatre with STC
1990	Once in a Lifetime		Sydney Opera House Drama Theatre with STC
