= The Removalists (film) =

- Directed by: Tom Jeffrey
- Written by: David Williamson
- Produced by: Richard Brennan (associate); Margaret Fink
- Starring: Peter Cummins; John Hargreaves; Kate Fitzpatrick; Jacki Weaver; Chris Haywood
- Cinematography: Graham Lind
- Edited by: Anthony Buckley
- Music by: Galapagos Duck
- Production company: Margaret Fink Productions
- Distributed by: Seven Keys
- Release date: 16 October 1975
- Running time: 93 minutes
- Country: Australia
- Language: English
- Budget: A$250,000

The Removalists is a 1975 Australian film based on the play of the same name.

== Cast ==
- Peter Cummins as Sergeant Simmonds
- John Hargreaves as Constable Neville Ross
- Jacki Weaver as Fiona Carter
- Kate Fitzpatrick as Kate Mason
- Martin Harris as Kenny Carter
- Chris Haywood as the removalist

== Production ==
Film rights to the play were bought by Margaret Fink. She originally wanted Roman Polanski to direct and Robert Mitchum to star but this proved impossible. She offered the film to Ted Kotcheff, who turned it down. She then considered Tim Burstall, who worked well with Williamson, but decided he was unsuitable after watching Alvin Purple (1973) and did not want to work with Fred Schepisi despite that director's interest. She called Tom Jeffrey for names of directors in his capacity as head of the Producers and Directors Guild of Australia and he expressed his own interest in directing. Fink saw Pastures of the Blue Crane and hired him.

The Australian Film Development Corporation put up half the budget in the form of a two-year loan. The rest of the money came from Ross Woods Productions, Clearing House, TVW7 and Leon Fink Holdings.

Kate Fitzpatrick and Jacki Weaver repeated their stage performances however Don Crosby and Max Phipps, who played the police, were replaced by Peter Cummins and John Hargreaves. The setting of the story was changed from Melbourne to Sydney.

The film was shot at Ajax Studios at Bondi. It was the last movie shot at the studio before it closed. It is now used as a haberdashery store. The studio hosted Michael Powell's Age of Consent and Ted Kotcheff's Wake in Fright among several others.

Filming was tense, with the relationship between Fink and Jeffrey disintegrating. Fink ended up firing Jeffrey's wife, Sue Milliken, from her position as production manager.

The music director was Nathan Waks.

== Release ==
The film was not a success at the box office but was critically well received.

== See also ==
- The Removalists at IMDb
