= Young Ramsay =

Australian television series

- Starring: John Hargreaves; Serge Lazareff; Vic Gordon
- Country of origin: Australia
- No. of seasons: 2
- No. of episodes: 26

Original release
- Network: Seven Network
- Release: 30 October 1977 – 8 November 1980

Young Ramsay is an Australian television drama series which ran from 1977 to 1980 on the Seven Network. It was produced by Crawford Productions as two series of 13 episodes each.

== Plot ==
Veterinarian Peter Ramsay (John Hargreaves) relocates from Sydney to the countryside to join the practice of semi-retired vet Jack Lambert (Vic Gordon).

== Cast ==
=== Main ===
- John Hargreaves as Peter Ramsay
- Serge Lazareff as Ray Turner
- Vic Gordon as Jack Lambert (season 1 only)
- Barbara Llewellyn as Julie Lambert (season 1 only)
- Louise Howitt as Cassie McCallum (season 2 only)
- John Howard as Bob Scott (season 2 only)

=== Guests ===
Actor	Role	Episodes
Alyson Best	Isobel Peach	
Bettina Welch	Rhonda Thompson	
Bill Hunter	Frank Adams	
Brian Blain	Dunn	
Brian Wenzel	Ken Cooper	
Briony Behets	Chrissie Thompson	1
Candy Raymond	April Kent	1
Christine Amor	Diana Frost	1
Colleen Hewett	Kathy Rand	
Danny Adcock	Ben Salter	
David Gulpilil	Aborigine	
Diane Craig	Sara/Tess Cameron	2
Di Smith	Nurse	
Ernie Bourne	Blowfly	
Frank Gallacher	Dave Foster	
Gerry Duggan	Hardluck Harris	
Graeme Blundell	Bob O’Hara	
Greg Rowe	Billy Foster	
Harold Hopkins	Ken Murray	1
Ian Smith	Doctor	
Jennifer Cluff	Elsie Barton	1
Jonathan Hardy	Colonel Flynn	1
Judith McGrath	Ethel Dean / Rosemary Billings	
Julieanne Newbould	Georgie Garrett	
Kirsty Child	Jocelyn Scott	
Les Foxcroft	Stan Hawkins / Ted Brent	2
Lewis Fitz-Gerald	Maurice Morpeth	
Lois Ramsey	Maisie O’Brien	
Max Cullen	Alec Thompson	
Mercia Deane-Johns	Eleanor	1
Michele Fawdon	Toni Fields	1
Miles Buchanan	Nick Adams	1
Monica Maughan	Shirley Watt	
Ned Manning	Joe Taylor	1
Penne Hackforth-Jones	Emma Carroll	
Peter Gwynne	Roy McPherson	
Peter Sumner	Bob Marshall	
Queenie Ashton	Dolly Farrell	
Rob Carlton		
Rob Steele	Stan Baker	
Rod Mullinar	George	
Roger Ward	Phil Angel	1
Ron Graham	Bruce Watt	
Ruth Cracknell	Hazel Barton	
Sam Neill	Crossland	
Sigrid Thornton	Annette Murray	
Stefan Dennis	Sid Atkinson	1
Syd Heylen	Sid Kelly	
Syd Conabere	Pat Muldoon	
Terry Gill	Fred	
Terry McDermott	Mr Eastwood	1
Terry Norris	‘Old Wombat’ Thompson	1
Tim Robertson	Russell Scott	1
Tommy Dysart	Paddy Rourke	
Walter Pym	Bloke in Pub	1

== Filming locations ==
The series was filmed at Tooradin on the Mornington Peninsula, Victoria, and in the Healesville surrounds - representing the area of ‘Jindarra’.

== Awards ==
Year	Award	Title	Status
1980	Penguin Award (Television Society of Australia)	Best TV Play or TV Movie Direction (Kevin Dobson, Young Ramsay)	Won
