= Rush (1974 TV series) =

- Starring: John Waters; Brendon Lunney; Olivia Hamnett; Alwyn Kurts; Max Meldrum; Alain Doutey; Vincent Ball; Jane Harders; Paul Mason
- Country of origin: Australia
- Original language: English
- No. of episodes: 25

Production
- Running time: 50 minutes

Original release
- Network: ABC TV
- Release: 20 August 1974 – 1976

Rush is an Australian television series produced by the Australian Broadcasting Corporation between 1974 and 1976. The first 13 episodes were produced in 1974 and filmed in black and white. In 1976, 13 more episodes were produced, in colour, in conjunction with French public broadcaster Antenne 2. Each series featured a different cast with the exception of John Waters.

== Story and characters ==
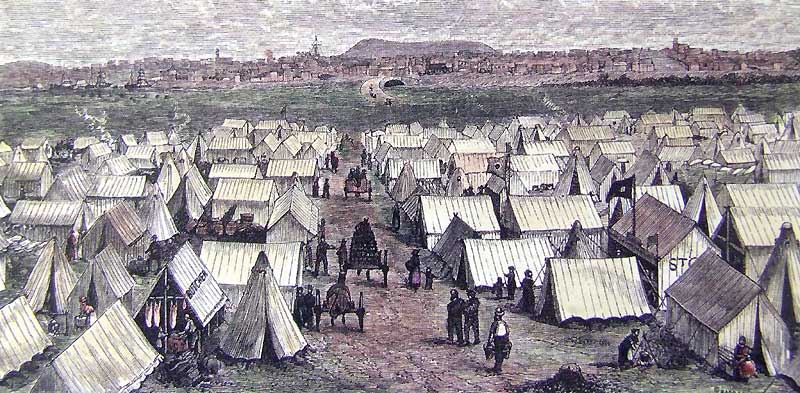
'Canvas Town', a coloured lithograph by Samuel Thomas Gill

Rush was a historical drama set during the Victorian Gold Rush of the 1850s. The first series was set at "Crocker's Gully", a fictitious goldfield created for the series at the foothills of the Dandenongs, near Melbourne. The village of tents and timbered huts was modelled on the lithographs of Samuel Thomas Gill, an artist who portrayed life on the Victorian goldfields during the 1850s.

The story revolves mainly round Edmond Fitzalan (played by Brendon Lunney), a young and inexperienced Gold Commissioner who is stationed at Crocker's Gully. The Gold Commission Service was formed to maintain law and order and to deal with licensing fees on the goldfields.

The main cast the first year featured Waters, Olivia Hamnett, Brendon Lunney, Alwyn Kurts, Peter Flett, Max Meldrum.

The sequel in 1976 had the setting relocated to New South Wales, with the action occurring nine years later (1860) than the first series. It was set in Turon Springs (formerly Wheogo), but shot near Belrose outside Sydney utilising sets left over from a previous historical drama about Ben Hall. John Waters, playing the part of Sgt Mackellar, co-starred with French actor Alain Doutey as Constable Emile Bizard. Other stars included: Jane Harders, Delore Whitman, and Vincent Ball. David Gulpilil was a guest actor when an aboriginal character was in the script.

The series began with a feature length episode, followed by 50-minute episodes. It began screening on ABC-TV on 20 August 1974 in Victoria, and later in other States.

== Awards ==
John Waters won the 1976 Sammy Award for Best Lead Actor in a Television Series for his work on Rush. The last episode of season two, A Shilling a Day, garnered multiple awards. Screenwriter Colin Free won the 1977 Logie Award for Best Drama Script, and the 1977 Australian Writer's Guild (AWGIE) for Best TV series episode. Actor Hugh Keays-Byrne won the 1976 Sammy Award for Best Actor in a Single Television Performance for his role in the episode, and he would go on to win the 1977 Logie Award for Best Individual Performance by an Actor for this role.

== Theme music and commercial releases ==
The theme to the series, was released as a hit single in Australia by Brian May and the ABC Showband (b/w The Theme from Seven Little Australians) on the Image record label in 1974. The composer of the score was George Dreyfus, whilst Brian May was responsible for the arrangement. The single made number 5 in the Australian national singles chart in December 1974. The opening sequence of the theme has some concurrence with British folk song Ten Thousand Miles Away

The original television series has not been commercially released, because the talent was contracted for broadcast rights only.

== Season One ==
=== Cast ===
- John Waters as Sgt. Robert McKellar
- Olivia Hamnett as Sarah Lucas
- Brendon Lunney as Commissioner Edmund Fitzalan
- Alwyn Kurts as Lansdowne
- Max Meldrum as George Williams
- Peter Flett as Dr. David Woods

=== Episodes ===
1. Of All The Crowd That Assembled There - w Howard Griffithd d David Zweck & Douglas Sharp
2. They'll Yet Regret
3. They Faced All The Dangers, Those Bold Bushrangers - w Sonia Borg d David Zweck
4. Toe The Scratch And Never Say Die - w David Boutland d Oscar Whitbread
5. There's A Change From The Old To The New - w John Martin d Keith Wilkes
6. For That New Promised Land - w Cliff Green d David Zweck
7. Three Cheers For Her Gracious Majesty - w James Davern d Keith Wilkes
8. Lament The Days That Are Gone By - w Sonia Borg d Douglas Sharp
9. Poor John Chow Chow - w Oriel Gray d Keith Wilkes
10. Manners Maketh Man - w James Davern d David Zweck
11. There's A Good Time Coming - w Sonia Borg d Douglas Sharp
12. There's Only You, Mate, And I - w Howard Griffiths d David Zweck

== Season Two ==
=== Cast ===
- John Waters as Sgt. Robert McKellar
- Alain Doutey as Constable Emile Bizard
- Vincent Ball as Supt. James Kendall
- Jane Harders as Jessie Farrar
- Delore Whitman as Rosie Morgan
- Paul Mason as Jessie Farrar
- Hugh Keays-Byrne

=== Episodes ===
1. Welcome Back Sergeant McKellor - w James Davern d Frank Arnold
2. The Great Eastern Bubble - w Colin Free d Rob Stewart
3. Romany Gold - w James Davern & Victor Sankey d Michael Jenkins
4. The New Golden Mountain - w David Boutland d Frank Arnold
5. La Belle France - w Ted Roberts d Rob Stewart
6. Farrar's Pride - w James Davern d Frank Arnold
7. Live to Fight Another Day - w Ted Roberts d Michael Jenkins
8. I'll See You Dead McKellor - w Colin Free d Frank Arnold
9. You Just Can't Win - w Ted Roberts d Eric Tayler
10. The Kadaitcha Man - w Ted Roberts d Rob Stewart
11. McKellar R.I.P. - w James Davern d Rob Stewart
12. The Second Oldest Trade - w Colin Free d Michael Jenkins
13. A Shilling a Day - w Colin Free d Michael Jenkins

== Later parody ==
A recurring segment in the first season of the ABC comedy program The Late Show (1992) was a parody-overdub of Rush titled The Olden Days. The segments consisted of re-edited and re-voiced black & white clips from the first season of Rush. Brendon Lunney's character was renamed "Governor Frontbottom" and voiced by Tony Martin; John Waters' character was renamed "Sgt. Olden" and voiced by Mick Molloy; Alwyn Kurts' character was renamed "Judge Muttonchops" and voiced by Martin; and the setting was changed to "the Victorian Mud Fields." In the Late Show episode which featured the final segment of The Olden Days, Lunney and Waters appeared as surprise guests (humorously dubbing their voices over Tony Martin and Mick Molloy, before appearing in person live on stage).

The collected segments were later released on VHS tape as The Late Show Presents The Olden Days. In 2007, The Olden Days (along with Bargearse, a parody-overdub of the 1970s TV show Bluey) were released on DVD. On the commentary track Santo Cilauro revealed they discovered a missing episode, mislabeled in a film can.

== See also ==
- List of Australian television series
