= Don's Party =

1971 play by David Williamson

- Written by: David Williamson
- Original language: English
- Genre: Comedy-drama
- Setting: Suburban house

Premiere
- Date premiered: 1971
- Place premiered: Australia

Don's Party is a 1971 play by David Williamson set during the 1969 Australian federal election. The play opened on 11 August 1971 at The Pram Factory theatre in Carlton.

== Plot ==
Don Henderson is a schoolteacher living with his wife Kath and baby son in the Melbourne suburb of Lower Plenty. On the night of the 1969 federal election Don invites a small group of friends to celebrate a predicted Australian Labor Party (ALP) election victory, much to the dismay of his wife. To the party come Mal, Don's university mentor, and his bitter wife Jenny, sex-obsessed Cooley and his latest girlfriend, nineteen-year-old Susan, Evan, a dentist, and his beautiful artist wife Kerry. Somehow, two Liberal supporters, Simon and Jody also come.

As the party wears on it becomes clear that the Labor party, which is supported by Don and most of the guests, is not winning. As a result, alcohol consumption increases, and the sniping between Don and his male friends about their failed aspirations gets uglier, as does their behaviour toward the women. Mack, a design engineer whose wife has just left him, pulls out a nude photo of her for his friends' approval. Crass womaniser Cooley pursues the available women. The disillusioned wives exchange tales of their husbands' sub-par sexual performance. By the end of the night, Don and some of his friends have begun to grasp the emptiness of their compromised lives.

The play led to a 2011 sequel, Don Parties On.

== Film version ==
See Don's Party
