= John Hargreaves (actor) =

Australian actor

- Born: John William Hargreaves; 28 November 1945; Murwillumbah, New South Wales, Australia
- Died: 8 January 1996 (aged 50); Sydney, New South Wales, Australia
- Occupation: Actor
- Years active: 1966–1996

John William Hargreaves (28 November 1945 – 8 January 1996) was an Australian actor. He won three Australian Film Institute Awards and was nominated six times.

== Background ==
John William Hargreaves was born on 28 November 1945 in Murwillumbah, New South Wales, and educated at Marist College Kogarah. He taught in Mendooran, but moved to Sydney in the 1960s. He graduated from the National Institute of Dramatic Art (NIDA) in 1970.

Hargreaves was mainly a film actor, but is well-remembered by Australian audiences for the title role in the TV drama Young Ramsay in the 1970s and worked in a number of stage productions. Hargreaves had roles in The Removalists (1975), Don's Party (1976), The Odd Angry Shot (1979), and Malcolm (1986). He played the love interest of Nicole Kidman's character in Emerald City (1988).

In 1994 he became the first actor to receive the Byron Kennedy Award.

== Personal life and death ==
Although he had exclusively heterosexual relationships while young, by the early 1980s Hargreaves acknowledged and embraced his homosexuality. Between 1984 and 1988, he partnered with French actor Vincent Perrot.

Hargreaves contracted HIV about 1994 and died of AIDS-related complications in a hospice in Sydney on 8 January 1996. Pallbearers at Hargreaves's funeral included actors Sam Neill and Bryan Brown.

== Filmography ==
=== Film ===
Year	Title	Role	Notes
1966	They're a Weird Mob	Youth reading paper at train station (uncredited)	Feature film
1974	Essington		TV movie
1975	Last Rites	Bennett	TV movie
1975	Sunday Too Far Away	Uncredited	Feature film
1975	The Removalists	Constable Neville Ross	Feature film
1976	Mad Dog Morgan	Baylis	Feature film
1976	Don's Party	Don Henderson	Feature film
1976	Death Cheaters	Steve Hall	Feature film
1978	A Good Thing Going	Phil Harris	TV movie Logie Award for Best Actor in a miniseries/telemovie
1978	Long Weekend	Peter	Feature film Nominated – Sitges Film Festival award for Best Actor
1978	Little Boy Lost	Jacko Walls	Feature film
1979	The Odd Angry Shot	Bung	Feature film
1979	Banana Bender	Tom Hardy	TV movie
1981	The Killing of Angel Street	Elliott	Feature film
1981	Hoodwink	Martin Stang	Feature film Nominated – Australian Film Institute Award for Best Actor in a Leading Role
1982	Beyond Reasonable Doubt	Arthur Allan Thomas	Feature film
1983	Careful, He Might Hear You	Logan	Feature film Australian Film Institute Award for Best Actor in a Supporting Role
1984	The Great Gold Swindle	Ray Mickelberg	TV movie
1984	My First Wife	John	Feature film Australian Film Institute Award for Best Actor in a Leading Role
1986	Double Sculls	Sam Larkin	Feature film
1986	Comrades	Convict	Animated film
1986	Sky Pirates	Lt. Harris	Feature film
1986	Malcolm	Frank Baker	Feature film Australian Film Institute Award for Best Actor in a Supporting Role
1987	The Place at the Coast	Neil McAdam	Feature film
1987	Cry Freedom	Bruce Haigh	Feature film (based on Australian diplomat Bruce Haigh)
1988	Boundaries of the Heart	Andy Ford	Feature film
1988	Emerald City	Colin Rogers	Feature film Nominated – Australian Film Institute Award for Best Actor in a Leading Role
1990	Sweet Revenge	Jim Harris	Feature film
1993	Blackfellas	Detective Maxwell	Feature film
1994	No Worries	Clive Ryan	Film
1994	Country Life	Jack Dickens	Film; Byron Kennedy Award; Nominated – Australian Film Institute Award for Best Actor in a Leading Role
1995	Hotel Sorrento	Dick Bennett	Feature film
1996	Lust and Revenge	Gallery Sleaze	Feature film

=== Television ===
Year	Title	Role	Notes
1969	Pastures of the Blue Crane		TV series
1972	Over There	Robert Kirby	TV series
1972	Behind the Legend	Tom Roberts	TV series
1972–74	Matlock Police	Doug Thompson / Peter Smith / Roy Jones	TV series, 3 episodes: "Everybody Else Has Everything", "The Last Laugh", "A Weekends Entertainment"
1973	Division 4	Jackson/John	TV series, 2 episodes: "Wasteground", "A Wild Wild Rose"
1973	Spyforce	Captain/Navigator	TV series, 2 episodes: "The Trail", "The Journey"
1974	And the Big Men Fly	Achilles Jones	TV series
1974–76	Homicide	Billy Day / David Taylor / Kevin Watson / Steve Brennan	TV series, 4 episodes: "Cowboy Billy Day", "You Hear about the Slasher", "The Egotist", "On The Run"
1975	Silent Number	Terry Lucas	TV series, 1 episode: "His Own Private War"
1976	Power Without Glory	Bill Evans	TV miniseries
1976	Bluey	Eric Yates	TV series, 1 episode: "One Man Band"
1977–80	Young Ramsay	Peter Ramsay	TV series
1982	Last Breakfast in Paradise		
1983	Scales of Justice	Constable Borland	TV miniseries
1983	The Dismissal	Dr. Jim Cairns	TV miniseries
1983	Carson's Law		TV series
1988	The Heroes	Ted Carse	TV miniseries
1988	Opération Mozart	Harrington	TV short
1988	The Alien Years	William	TV miniseries
1991	Marie Curie, une femme honourable	Rutherford	TV miniseries
1992	The Leaving of Liverpool	Harry	TV miniseries
1992	Rome Roméo	David Waldberg	
1993	G.P.	Dr. Oliver Loyd	TV series, 1 episode: "Infected"
1995	Blue Murder	Chester Porter QC	TV miniseries

=== Below the line credits ===
- Without a Clue (1988) – runner

=== Other credits ===
- Second Best (1994)
- completion guarantee services (The Completion Bond Company Inc) Whore (1991)

== Theatre ==
Year	Title	Role	Location
1967	The Choephori (The Libation Bearers)	Chorus Member	UNSW
1968	Sam, The Highest Jumper of Them All, or the London Comedy		New Theatre, Sydney
1968	Postmark Zero		New Theatre, Sydney
1968	America Hurrah		New Theatre, Sydney
1969	The Night of the Iguana	Hank / Herr Fahrenkopf	NIDA Theatre
1969	In the Gloaming, Oh My Darling (student graduation play)	Mr. Birdsong	Jane Street Theatre
1969	Look Back in Anger	Jimmy Porter	Jane Street Theatre
1970	Cat on a Hot Tin Roof		Old Tote Theatre
1970	A Midsummer Night's Dream		Old Tote Theatre
1970	Blood Wedding		Old Tote Theatre
1970	Biggles	Biggles	Nimrod Street Theatre
1971	As You Like It		Parade Theatre
1971	The Man of Mode		Parade Theatre
1971	A Month in the Country		Parade Theatre, Canberra Theatre
1971	The Resistible Rise of Arturo Ui		Parade Theatre, Canberra Theatre
1971	The National Health or Nurse Norton's Affair		Parade Theatre
1971	Lasseter		Parade Theatre with Old Tote Theatre
1971	The Au Pair Man		Independent Theatre
1972	Jugglers Three		Union Hall, Adelaide
1973	Crete and Sergeant Pepper		Union Hall, Adelaide
1973	Measure for Measure		Union Hall, Adelaide
1975	The Ride Across Lake Constance		Nimrod Theatre
1975	The Importance of Being Earnest		Sydney Opera House
1977	The Training Run	Constable Patrick Reilly	Bondi Pavilion
1980	The Sunny South	Matt Morley	Sydney Opera House
1980	Bent	Max	Playhouse Adelaide
1981	Cat on a Hot Tin Roof	Brick	Sydney Opera House with Sydney Theatre Company
1983	Present Laughter		Theatre Royal, Sydney
1990	Love Letters	Andrew Makepeace Ladd III	Sydney Opera House

== See also ==
- List of Australian film actors
