= A Good Thing Going =

- Screenplay by: Judith Colquhoun; Don Harley
- Directed by: Arch Nicholson
- Starring: John Hargreaves; Chris Haywood; Veronica Lang
- Country of origin: Australia
- Original language: English

Production
- Producer: Don Harley
- Cinematography: Dean Semler
- Running time: 72 minutes
- Production company: Film Australia

Original release
- Release: 1978

A Good Thing Going is a 1978 Australian television film directed by Arch Nicholson. It stars John Hargreaves and won four Logie Awards.

== Plot ==
Phil Harris (Hargreaves) spends more time with his best friend, Terry (Haywood) than with his wife and children. Phil's marriage disintegrates, with his wife (Lang) taking flight and leaving him to care for their distressed children.

== Cast ==
- John Hargreaves as Phil Harris
- Chris Haywood as Terry
- Veronica Lang as Jane Harris
- Miles Buchanan as Damien Harris
- Simone Buchanan as Cathy Harris
- Beth Buchanan as Little girl in supermarket (uncredited)
- Tina Bursill as Jeanette
- Sandra Lee Paterson

== Awards ==
Logie Awards of 1980

- Best Lead Actor in a Miniseries/Telemovie - John Hargreaves
- Best Supporting Actor in a Miniseries/Telemovie - Chris Haywood
- Best Supporting Actress in a Miniseries/Telemovie - Veronica Lang
- Best Performance by a Juvenile - Miles Buchanan
