= Sheila Florance =

Australian actress (1916–1991)

- Florance as Lizzie Birdsworth in Prisoner (also known internationally as Prisoner: Cell Block H) (1980)
- Born: Sheila Mary Florance; 24 July 1916; East St Kilda, Victoria, Australia
- Died: 12 October 1991 (aged 75); Melbourne, Australia
- Occupations: Television and film actress; theatre performer
- Years active: c. 1930s – 1991
- Spouse(s): Roger Lightfoot Oyston (1934–1944, his death); John Balawaider (1946–1983, his death)
- Children: 3

Sheila Mary Florance (24 July 1916 – 12 October 1991) was an Australian actress known for her work in theatre, television and film.

Born in Melbourne, she married an Englishman in 1934 and relocated to London. Her early career was based on the London stage. Her first husband died in World War II in 1944.

In 1948, Florance returned to Australia and resumed her acting career, initially in the theatre before transitioning to film and television. She appeared in various Crawford Productions, gaining recognition for her role as Dossie Rumsay in Bellbird. She achieved international fame for her portrayal of Lizzie Birdsworth, an elderly alcoholic convict, in the television series Prisoner.

Florance died in 1991 from lung cancer, a week after receiving the AACTA Award for Best Actress in a Leading Role for her final film, A Woman's Tale.

== Biography ==
=== Early life ===
Florance was born on 24 July 1916 at 42 Carrington Grove, East St Kilda, Melbourne. She was the eldest daughter of costumier Frances Josephine (née Lalor) and school teacher James Horn Florance. Sheila had at least one sibling: Peter John Lalor Florance (1923–2008).

Florance was educated at Presentation College, Windsor. She left school at the age of 15. With her father's support, she developed an interest in acting and began taking small roles with the Melbourne Little Theatre at St Chad's in South Yarra.

In February 1935, Florance achieved one of her early theatrical successes, appearing in John Hastings Turner's play The Spot on the Sun. The production was staged by and featured Ada Reeve.

=== First marriage and move to England ===
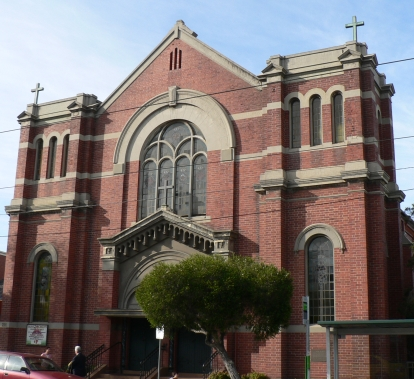
The church in Balaclava where Sheila married Roger Oyston in 1934

On 19 April 1934, at the age of 17, Florance married Roger Lightfoot Oyston, a visiting Englishman, at Holy Angels Catholic Church (Note: Holy Angels Catholic Church was renamed Saint Colman's Church in 1938.) in Balaclava following a whirlwind romance. The couple had their first child, a daughter named Susan, the following year. The family moved to England, initially staying with Roger's parents in Deepdale Avenue, Scarborough, Yorkshire, before settling in a house on Sewerby Avenue, Bridlington. Their first son, Peter, (Note: Peter Oyston became a distinguished theatre director and educator in both England and Australia. He died on 9 October 2011, aged 73.) was born on 20 May 1938.

As World War II approached, Florance joined the Women's Land Army and worked on a farm near Bempton while her husband enlisted as an officer cadet. Florance often recounted a story of having a second daughter, Bridget, who she reported was killed in an air raid in 1941. However, no official record of Bridget's birth or death exists, and Florance's eldest son, Peter, was unable to verify the story.

In 1942, Susan and Peter were sent to boarding schools but later returned to live at Mill Farm. In June 1944, Roger Oyston, now a captain, (Note: Roger Oyston was still a 2nd Lt. in 1942, but by 1 April 1944 he had been promoted to captain.) went missing in action in France. Florance did not receive confirmation of his death until the following year. Their second son, Philip Michael, was born in September 1944.

After returning to Australia, Florance often recounted experiences of working with the British Drama League, the Council for the Encouragement of Music and the Arts, and the Oxford Repertory Company during her time in Britain.

=== Second marriage and return to Australia ===
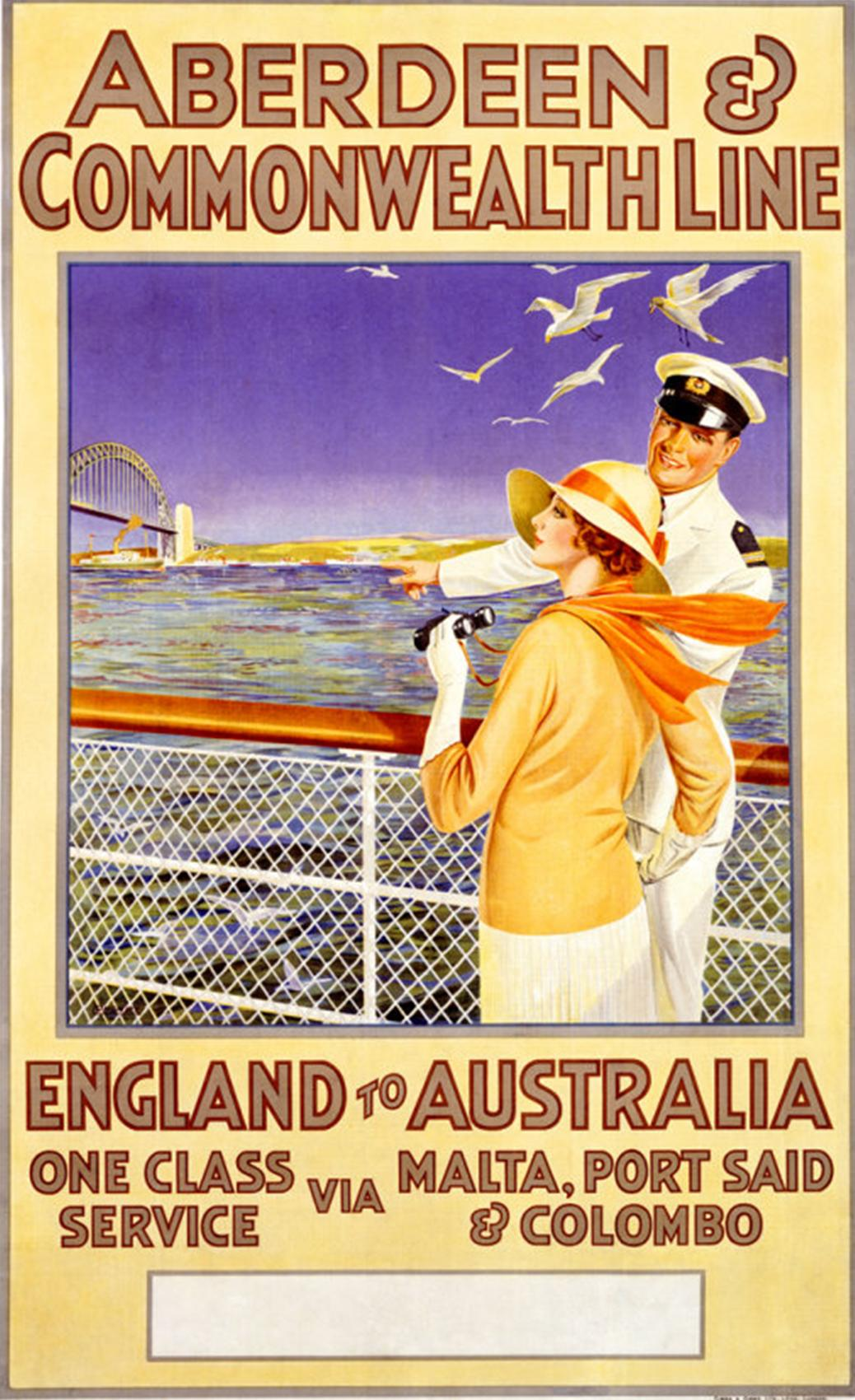
Poster giving an idyllic impression of the overcrowded journey Florance took with her three children in 1948

After World War II, Sheila Florance met Polish airman Jan Adam "John" Balawaider, (Note: His original surname, according to service records, was Balawajder.) who had served in the Royal Air Force with 158 Squadron during the war. (Note: While it was not unusual for Polish aircrew to serve in the Polish RAF squadrons, it was unusual to find one serving in the regular RAF.) The couple married on 3 September 1946 at Holy Cross Church in Hucknall, Nottingham. (Note: This was a small church, contrary to Florance's stories of having married at Nottingham Cathedral.)

Florance and Balawaider decided to emigrate to Australia. Upon marrying Balawaider, Florance acquired Polish nationality, which classified her as an alien and delayed her departure. While Balawaider, as a veteran, was able to travel ahead, Florance faced bureaucratic hurdles before she and her three children could join him. Eventually, they departed England aboard the Aberdeen & Commonwealth Line vessel Esperance Bay on 6 March 1948.

Upon arrival in Fremantle, Peter Oyston recalled his mother "ran down the gangplank ahead of everyone else and against the orders of the Captain or the crew, and knelt on the soil in the port, and then grabbed a handful of gravel and started eating it, and saying, 'Oh, Australia, Australia, I'm home, I'm home. My lovely country."

Florance was soon reunited with her husband and the family moved into a run-down wooden cottage in Prahran, Victoria. By 1954, Florance's home, often referred to as "The Hovel," became a hub of social activity. According to Peter Oyston:

"[o]ver those years my sister and I worked out that we had 82 callers a week, not counting those who came more than once. It was constant open house. My stepfather would start a party with his muso friends while my mother was at the theatre. And then my mother would bring back the cast and any people who came to see the shows. And the taxi drivers and, if the police called to quieten us up, then the police would be invited in and they'd join the party too. It really was an extraordinary time."

In March 1954, Florance's 18-year-old daughter, Susan Oyston, fell from the roof of her workplace, the nine-storey National Bank building in Collins Street, Melbourne. At the time, Florance believed the fall was accidental. In a later interview with Sam Newman, Florance said she thought it was probably suicide and that she had failed her daughter. Years after Florance's death, evidence was reported suggesting Susan might have been murdered.

After leaving Prisoner in 1983, Florance cared for Balawaider, who had suffered lifelong effects from wartime injuries. He died of cancer in October 1983.

=== Death ===
Florance died of lung cancer at the age of 75 on 12 October 1991. Nine days earlier, her son Philip had accepted the AACTA Award for Best Actress in a Leading Role on her behalf for her performance in her final film, A Woman's Tale.

Bud Tingwell wrote her obituary and said, "nothing I write can express properly the admiration and love for Sheila Florance felt by so many of us who knew her ... This week at a service of celebration for Sheila Florance in St Kilda, Melbourne, where she was born and lived, the church was packed. She had a full house and a standing ovation."

== Career ==
=== Theatre ===
After returning to Australia, Florance rejoined Melbourne's Little Theatre. In August 1951, she performed in Guy Bolton's Larger than Life. From February to March 1953, she toured Victoria with the Arrow Theatre's production Our Town, portraying Mrs. Gibbs in 63 performances over an eight-week tour. By January 1954, Florance became a member of the Union Theatre Repertory Company, receiving acclaim for her role as the mischievous aunt in Lesley Storm's The Day's Mischief. She worked alongside actors such as Barry Humphries and Peter O'Shaughnessy.

Florance's played Teresa Browne in the first Australian production of The Living Room (1954). Subsequent performances included roles in Mel Dinelli's The Man (1955), Elizabeth Addyman's The Secret Tent at the Arrow Theatre (1956), Reginald Denham's Ladies in Retirement (1956), Picnic (1956), Emlyn Williams' The Light of Heart (1956), and Misalliance at the Union Theatre (1956). She also played Cassandra in Christopher Fry's adaptation of Tiger at the Gates at the opening of the newly built theatre complex on St Martin's Lane. In 1959, she was awarded the Erik Award for Best Actress for her portrayal of Julia Rajk in Robert Ardrey's Shadow of Heroes.

Florance continued working in theatre in the 1960s, although she spent less time there. She earned a second Melbourne Critics Award nomination for her performance in The Chairs at the Little Theatre (1960). By 1961, Florance had left Channel 2 to concentrate on repertory theatre, appearing in Ferenc Molnár's The Guardsman (1961), The Dark at the Top of the Stairs (1961), and Dracula (1962). Also in 1962, Florance played Lady Macbeth in Macbeth at the Union Theatre. She also performed in Fritz Hochwälder's The Public Prosecutor at the Little Theatre (1962), Summer of the Seventeenth Doll at Russell Street Theatre (1962), and Michael Redgrave's adaptation of The Aspern Papers (1962).

In 1963, Florance toured Victoria with the Union Theatre Repertory Company's productions of Arms and the Man and Peter Batey's The No-Hopers. In 1964, she appeared in Fay and Michael Kanin's adaptation of Rashomon at St Martin's Theatre. In 1967, she joined the short-lived Melbourne Independent Theatre Company for their sole production, Brian Faull's Life for the Living, at the Emerald Hill Theatre and performed in The Birthday Party at St Martin's Theatre. In 1968, she appeared with the St Martin's Theatre company in Thomas Keneally's Halloran's Little Boat at the Playhouse Theatre, Perth as part of the Festival of Perth, and then in Melbourne at St Martin's Theatre. Florance's last play of the 1960s was The Little Foxes in 1968 at St Martin's Theatre.

Florance's 1970s theatre work included Tyrone Guthrie's production of All's Well That Ends Well (1970), Uncle Vanya at St Martin's Theatre (1971), Sam Cree's The Mating Season at Melbourne's Comedy Theatre (1972), The Prisoner of Second Avenue at Russell Street Theatre (1973), The Time is Not Yet Ripe at the Comedy Theatre (1973), Design for Living at St Martin's Theatre (1973–1974), Edward Bond's The Sea at Russell Street Theatre (1974), and The Doctor's Dilemma at St Martin's Theatre (1974).

In 1987, Florance performed in two final stage productions: Uncle Vanya at the Anthill Theatre and The Impostor at St Martin's Youth Arts Centre.

=== Film and television ===
By 1959, Florance was working as a floor manager at television station Channel 2. That year, she appeared in a minor role in the television series Emergency (episode "Mind Over Matter"). In late 1962 and early 1963, she played defendants Laura Radford and Jocelyn Matthews in two episodes of Consider Your Verdict.

In 1965, Florance made her film debut as a deaf-mute person in Clay. During post-production, she dubbed the voice of Janina Lebedew, who portrayed the character Margot. Florance also made her first of 18 appearances (Note: Florance made 18 appearances in Homicide between 1965 and 1975.) in Homicide and performed in Dangerous Corner, The Magic Boomerang (episode "The Stand-In"), and Romanoff and Juliet in 1965. In 1967, Florance began appearing intermittently as Dossie Rumsey in Bellbird, a role she continued into the 1970s. During this time, she also took on small roles in other productions such as Division 4.

In 1971, she portrayed Old Mrs Bacon in Country Town. That same year, she made her first of four appearances (Note: Florance also played two further characters in later episodes: Mrs Rees in "Squeeze, Don't Pull", and Emily Morrison in "Walk Like A Man".) as Grace Falconer in Matlock Police.

In 1973, Florance appeared as Lorna Russell in the first episode of Ryan. In 1974, she appeared in the film Petersen. (Note: Released in some countries as Jock Petersen) She continued to make single-episode appearances in television series such as Tandarra (1976), Bluey (1977), and Bobby Dazzler (1978), while increasingly focusing on film work.

In 1976, Florance played Mavis Lipton in End Play and had a small role in Illuminations. Her performance of Mrs Sullivan in The Devil's Playground (1976) was followed by roles in Raw Deal (1977) and Summerfield (1977). In 1979, she portrayed May Swaisey—an elderly farm owner and friend of protagonist Max Rockatansky—in Mad Max. During filming, Florance broke her leg while handling an antique shotgun and completed her scenes with her leg and hip in plaster.

==== Prisoner ====
Starting in 1979, Florance became widely recognised for her role as Elizabeth Josephine "Lizzie" Birdsworth in Prisoner. (Note: Known outside of Australia as Prisoner: Cell Block H) Initially depicted as a recalcitrant, alcoholic inmate who was later revealed to be innocent, Lizzie was originally a minor character. However, by 1980, the character became a central figure.

Florance was the only original cast member hired without an audition; Reg Watson offered her the role after reviewing her photograph and credits. She remained with the series from its debut until episode 418 in 1984, appearing in 403 episodes. Florance won two Logie Awards for her work on Prisoner: Best Lead Actress in a Series in 1981 and Best Supporting Actress in a Series in 1983. She also joined other cast members in Prisoner in Concert (1981), a comedy musical spin-off filmed at Pentridge Prison in Coburg, Victoria.

In 1990, a British fan club invited Florance and other cast members of Prisoner to the United Kingdom. On 22 August 1990, Florance and Val Lehman were honoured with a civic reception by the Mayor of Derby.

During the tour, Florance underwent surgery to remove a large tumour. She returned to the tour days after her operation.

==== Post-Prisoner ====
Following a hiatus after her second husband's death, Florance returned to acting with a role as Esme in the television series Winners (1985). She then appeared in Paul Cox's films Handle With Care (1985) as Margaret's mother and Cactus (1986) as Martha. Her later roles included playing grandmothers in Roger Scholes' The Tale of Ruby Rose (1987) and Hungry Heart (1987). Florance also appeared in the short comedy Kick Start (1987).

Florance concluded the 1980s with performances in the television movie Becca (1988) as Old Becca and in a 1989 episode of Round the Twist (1989) as Madame Fortune.

In 1990, Florance played the character Molly in Nirvana Street Murder. Later that year, she appeared in Golden Braid, portraying the "Lady with clock".

Florance's final film, A Woman's Tale (1991), was written specifically for her by Paul Cox and Barry Dickins as a tribute after they learned she was terminally ill with cancer. In the film, Florance portrayed Martha, an elderly, genteel woman living alone with her cherished possessions. Martha, who is dying of cancer, reflects on her life with her visiting nurse Anna (played by Gosia Dobrowolska). Cox recounted their collaboration in an interview with Richard Phillips:

I had a terrific friendship with Sheila Florance. In fact she acted in my very first film, and we always used to joke that I would make her a star. When I heard suddenly that she was dying of cancer I visited her immediately. There was no sentimentality or anything on her part—she was an incredible woman—but she said jokingly, 'There is still time to turn me into a star, but let's be quick.'

I went home and spent three days and three nights writing the script and then with Barry Dickins and Sheila we did another draft. She was given eight weeks to live and so we made A Woman's Tale with this hanging over us. This motivated us, of course, but Sheila had a degree of greatness about her. She was a very powerful woman.

It was an amazing challenge to make a film about life, in the face of death. To get the money of course was impossible and I had to pawn everything I had. People have asked me how we did it but to some extent we were idiotically courageous in taking this risk. Sheila and I joked all the time. I would say to Sheila, "Please don't die on me or you'll kill me". She would reply, "Don't worry, I'll be a good girl."

The film and Florance's performance garnered critical acclaim, winning Florance the AACTA Award for Best Actress in a Leading Role.

== Filmography ==
=== Film ===
Year	Title	Role	Type
1965	Clay	Deaf-mute	Feature film
1969	2000 Weeks	Woman on Ship (uncredited)	Feature film
1971	Country Town	Old Mrs. Bacon	Feature film
1974	Petersen	Tony's Mother	Feature film
1975	End Play	Mavis Lipton	Feature film
1976	Illuminations	Role unknown	Feature film
1976	The Devil's Playground	Mrs. Sullivan	Feature film
1977	Raw Deal	Old Lady	Feature film
1977	Summerfield	Miss Gleeson	Feature film
1979	Mad Max	May Swaisey (as Sheila Florence)	Feature film
1986	A Far Off World	Script Supervisor	Short film
1986	Cactus	Martha	Feature film
1987	The Tale of Ruby Rose	Grandma	Feature film
1987	Hungry Heart	Grandmother	Feature film
1987	Kick Start	Role unknown	Short film
1990	Golden Braid	Lady with clock	Feature film
1990	Nirvana Street Murder	Molly	Feature film
1991	A Woman's Tale	Martha	Feature film
1991	Secrets	Role unknown	Short film

=== Television ===
Year	Title	Role	Notes
1959	Emergency	Guest role: Petula Rogers	TV series, 1 episode S1E15
1962; 1963	Consider Your Verdict	Guest role: Jocelyn Matthews	TV series, Episode 67 (guest)
1963	Consider Your Verdict	Guest role: Laura Radford	TV series, 1 episode: 118
1965	Romanoff and Juliet	Archbishop	ABC Teleplay
1965	Dangerous Corner	Maud Mockridge	ABC Teleplay
1965–1975	Homicide	Guest roles: Mrs. Miller/Mrs. Nugent/Annabelle Tompkins/Jane Cochrane/Edna Kane/Mrs. Wakefield/Mrs. Galbraith/Neighbour/Mrs. Greenfield/Motel Owner/Sister Ignatius/Edna Jones/Mrs. Trainer/Miss Gregory/Grace Walker/Emma Perkins/Margaret	TV series, 18 episodes
1965	The Magic Boomerang	Guest role	TV series, 1 episode: 25
1966	Australian Playhouse	Guest role	TV series, 1 episode: 26
1968	Cobwebs in Concrete	Kathy	ABC Teleplay
1970	The Kings	Role unknown	Film documentary
1970–1974	Division 4	Guest roles: Woman/Mrs. James/Mrs. Mitchell/Mrs. Finney/Hotel Manageress/Mrs. Morris/Miss Bobby Paigely	TV series, 7 episodes
1971–1975	Matlock Police	Guest roles: Grace Falconer/Mrs. Rees/Emily Morrison	TV series, 6 episodes
1972	Bellbird	Regular role: Dossie Rumsey	ABC TV series, 176 episodes
1973	Ryan	Guest role: Lorna Russell	TV series, 1 episode: S1E1
1976	Bobby Dazzler	Guest role: Mrs. Jollie	TV series, 1 episode 12: "Command Performance"
1976	Tandarra	Guest role: Cuddy	TV series, 1 episode 5: "The Manly Art"
1977	Bluey	Guest role: Mrs. O'Brien	TV series, 1 episode 22: "The Fat Cat"
1978	Cop Shop	Guest role: Mum	TV series, 1 episode: 61
1979–1984	Prisoner	Regular role: Elizabeth "Lizzie" Birdsworth	TV series, Seasons 1–6, 404 episodes)
1979	The Franky Doyle Story	Lizzie Birdsworth	TV movie
1981	Prisoner in Concert	Herself / Lizzie Birdsworth	TV Concert Special
1985	Winners	Esme	TV Movie series, S1E5, "The Other Facts of Life"
1985	Handle with Care	Margaret's Mother	TV movie
1988	Rafferty's Rules	Guest role: Mrs. Patterson	TV series, 1 episode S4E21
1988	Becca	Old Becca	ABC TV movie
1989	Round the Twist	Guest role: Madame Fortune	ABC TV series, 1 episode S1E9
1990	The Great Escape	Herself/Lizzie Birdsworth	TV Special, UK
1991	Col'n Carpenter	Guest role: Mary	TV series, 1 episode S2E7

=== Other appearances ===
Year	Title	Role	Notes
1986	An Australian Audience with Dame Edna Everage	Guest – Herself as Audience member	TV Special
1983	The Mike Walsh Show	Guest – Herself	TV series, 1 episode
1982	Telethon 1982	Guest – Herself	TV special

== Theatre ==
Source: AusStage, Sheila appeared in numerous theatre roles in England and Australia. Note: the following are her roles in Australian productions only.

Title	Year
The Day's Mischief	1954
The Young Elizabeth	1954
The Living Room	1954
The Man	1955
Ladies in Retirement	1956
Picnic	1956
Tiger at the Gates	1956
The Light of Heart	1956
Misalliance	1956
The Diary of Anne Frank	1957
Dinner with the Family	1958
The Guardsman	1961
The Dark at the Top of the Stairs	1961
Rhinoceros	1961
Thataway the Kings Go	1961
Romanoff and Juliet	1961
Dracula	1962
Macbeth	1962
The Public Prosecutor	1962
Summer of the Seventeenth Doll	1962
The Aspern Papers	1962
Arms and the Man	1963
The No-Hopers	1963
End of the Beginning / Hello Out There / The Black Horse / The Man in the Bowler Hat	1963
Rashomon	1964
The Birthday Party	1967
Halloran's Little Boat	1968
The Little Foxes	1968
All's Well That Ends Well	1970
Uncle Vanya	1971
The Chalk Garden	1971
The Mating Season	1972
The Prisoner of Second Avenue	1973
The Time is Not Yet Ripe	1973
Design for Living	1973
The Sea	1974
The Doctor's Dilemma	1974
The Crucible	1977
Uncle Vanya	1987
The Imposter	1987
