= Mark Little (Australian actor) =

Australian actor, television presenter, comedian and screen/stage writer (born 1959)

- Born: 20 October 1959 (age 66); Brisbane, Queensland, Australia
- Occupations: Actor; comedian; television presenter; writer
- Years active: 1980–present
- Spouse: Cath Farr
- Children: 2

Mark Little (born 20 October 1959) is a British-Australian actor, television presenter, comedian and screen/stage writer. He is known for playing Joe Mangel on the Australian soap opera Neighbours from 1988 to 1991, in 2005 and in 2022.

== Career ==
Little graduated from NIDA in 1980. He appeared in a string of Australian films and TV series during the 1980s, including Short Changed (1986), written by Aboriginal playwright Bob Merritt and directed by George Ogilvie. He was nominated for Best Supporting Actor in the AFI Awards for this role.

He also performed his own comedy in Melbourne's comedy clubs throughout the eighties, while his longest-running television role was as Joe Mangel in the soap opera Neighbours, from 1988 to 1991. Owing to the show's popularity in the UK, he became known in the country and subsequently moved there.

In 1990, Little starred in Nirvana Street Murder, which was his first lead role in a feature film. That same year, he co-hosted with Tania Lacy on Countdown Revolution, a music show that was on ABC each week night. He and Lacy were fired from the show in June after their infamous protest about acts having to mime and the hosts having to pretend to like an artist, even if they didn't.

Little starred in the 1992 Australian film Greenkeeping, alongside Lisa Hensley. The part of Lenny was written for him by the film's writer and director David Caesar. In April 1994, he replaced Chris Evans as co-presenter of The Big Breakfast along with Gaby Roslin. He has also narrated cult TV series The Villa on Sky TV.

He has worked on films such as Blackball and in the West End with his one-man show Defending the Caveman, which also won the Laurence Olivier Award in 2000. He returned to Neighbours as Joe for a brief period in 2005.

Little appeared as Roy in a production of Louis Nowra's play Così at The White Bear Theatre in Kennington, London, in 2008. From the following year, he started making regular appearances on the discussion show The Wright Stuff.

As well as extended runs of Defending the Caveman at London's Leicester Square Theatre, he toured the play around the UK in 2010.

In 2010, he made his directorial debut starring in, designing and directing Jack Hibberd's A Stretch of the Imagination at The Cock Tavern Theatre in Kilburn, London.

Little has also written comedy films and poetry. He appeared in a documentary special celebrating Neighbours' 30th anniversary titled Neighbours 30th: The Stars Reunite, which aired in Australia and the UK in March 2015.

In 2017, Little played the character of "Fleshcreep" in a pantomime production of Jack and the Beanstalk at the Palace Theatre, Mansfield.

In 2019, Little took part in the eleventh series of Dancing on Ice, partnered with Brianne Delcourt. They become the first couple to leave after the judges chose to save ex-cricketer Ryan Sidebottom and his skating partner Brandee Malto in the skate-off.

He has also taken many self-devised shows to the Edinburgh Festival Fringe and toured them nationally throughout the UK.

In 2021, he appeared at the Middlesbrough Little Theatre in a pantomime production of Peter Pan, playing the part of Captain Hook.

In 2022, he reprised his role of Joe Mangel for a guest appearance in the then-final episodes of Neighbours.

== Awards and nominations ==
Year	Award	Category	Work	Result	Ref.
1984	Logie Awards	Best Supporting Actor	Waterfront	Nominated	
1985	Australian Film Institute	Best Supporting Actor	An Indecent Obsession	Nominated	
1986	Penguin Awards	Sustained Performance by an Actor in a Principal/Supporting Role in a Series/Serial	The Flying Doctors	Won	
1986	Australian Film Institute	Best Supporting Actor	Short Changed	Nominated	
1990	Penguin Awards	Best Actor	Neighbours	Nominated	
1997	Paramount Comedy Award, Edinburgh Festival Fringe		Psychobubble	Won	
2000	Laurence Olivier Award	Best Entertainment	Defending the Caveman	Won	
2008	Brighton Festival of Artists Open Houses	Best Open House; Contributing Artist	Cath Farr: The Art of Fun	Won	

== Filmography ==
=== Film ===
Year	Title	Role	Type
1982	Tennis Elbow	Sidney Tower	
1982	The Clinic	Basil	Feature film
1982	Starstruck	Carl	Feature film
1985	Wills & Burke	John King	Feature film
1985	An Indecent Obsession	Benedict Maynard	Feature film
1986	Short Changed	Curly	Feature film
1987	A Matter of Convenience	Roger Purvis	TV film
1988	Evil Angels (aka A Cry in the Dark)	Constable Morris	Feature film
1988	Bachelor Girl	Waiter	TV movie
1990	Golden Braid	Punk	Feature film
1990	Nirvana Street Murder	Boady	Feature film
1992	Greenkeeping	Lenny	Feature film
1999	Distant Shadow	The Landlord	Feature film
2003	Blackball	Mark Doohan	Feature film
2015	The Program	Rupert Guinness	Feature film
2022	Passing Through	Tom	Feature film

=== Television ===
Year	Title	Role	Type
1980	Skyways		TV series
1981	Cop Shop		TV series
1981	The Sullivans		TV series
1984	Infinity Limited	Rosco	TV series, 17 episodes
1984	Waterfront	Allan Williams	TV miniseries
1985	The Dunera Boys	Pete Dunstan	TV miniseries
1985	The Flying Doctors	'Roughneck' Ron	TV miniseries
1986	The Flying Doctors	Ron Miller	TV series
1986	The Gillies Republic		TV series
1988-91, 2005, 2022	Neighbours	Joe Mangel	TV series
1990	Countdown Revolution	Presenter	TV series
1994	The Big Breakfast	Presenter	TV series
1999-2000	The Villa	Narrator	TV series
1999	The Rat Trap		
2001	Motion	Foreman	
2001	Summer Rain	Travel Agency Manager	
2008	Casualty	Gary Forrester	TV series
2008	Emmerdale	Jonty DeLorean	TV series
2009	The Wright Stuff	Regular Guest	TV series
2010	Whites	Darryl Sommers	TV series
2015	Neighbours 30th: The Stars Reunite	Himself	TV special
2019	Dancing on Ice	Contestant	TV series

== Stage ==
Year	Title	Role	Type
1997	Psychobubble		Edinburgh Festival Fringe
	Defending the Caveman	Himself	West End of London
2008	Così	Roy	The White Bear Theatre, Kennington
2010	Defending the Caveman		Leicester Square Theatre & UK tour
2010	A Stretch of the Imagination		Cock Tavern Theatre, Kilburn, London
2017	Jack and the Beanstalk	Fleshcreep	Palace Theatre, Mansfield
2021	Peter Pan	Captain Hook	Middlesbrough Little Theatre
