= Handle with Care (1985 film) =

- Written by: Anne Brooksbank
- Directed by: Paul Cox
- Starring: Lucinda Cowden; Anna Maria Monticelli
- Country of origin: Australia
- Original language: English

Production
- Producers: Andrena Finlay; Anne Landa
- Running time: 75 mins
- Production company: Alsof

Original release
- Network: Network 10
- Release: 1985

Handle with Care is a 1985 Australian television film directed by Paul Cox and starring Lucinda Cowden and Anna Maria Monticelli. The screenplay concerns two women with breast cancer.

== Cast ==
- Lucinda Cowden as Sarah
- Anna Maria Monticelli as Kate
- Monica Maughan as Margaret
- Nina Landis as Julie
- Tony Llewellyn-Jones as Mark
- Peter Curtin as Paul
- Bettina Arndt as Interviewer
- Norman Kaye as Surgeon
- Bud Tingwell as Doctor
- Sheila Florance as Margaret's mother
