= Takis Emmanuel =

Greek-Australian actor (1933–2017)

Takis Emmanuel (Greek: Τάκης Εμμανουήλ, 1933 – 26 August 2017) was a Greek-Australian actor. In Australia he was best known for his collaborations with Paul Cox.

== Biography ==
Emmanuel was born in Mesolongi and studied drama at the Athens Conversatory Drama School

He began his career in Greece, at the anciuent theatre in Epidaurus in Euripides Ifigenia, he appeared in many notable Greek films of the 1960s. He worked widely in Europe then for a number of years in Australia. He later returned to Greece.

He had a brief cameo part in the James Bond film On Her Majesty's Secret Service (film)

After retiring from the film industry, he concentrted on literature and writing novels.

== Filmography ==
- To potami (1960) - Markos
- Electra (1962) - Pylades
- Ouranos (1962) - Giagos
- Mikres Afrodites (1963) - Tsakalos
- Amok (1963)
- Mesanyhta sti villa Nelli (1963)
- O krahtis (1964) - Mihalis
- Zorba the Greek (1964) - Manolakas
- Ou klepseis (1965) - Petrakas
- Ta dyhtia tis dropis (1965)
- Otan simanoun oi kabanes (1965) - Alkis Hristopoulos
- Enonei o ponos dyo kardies (1965) - Lambros
- I exodos tou Mesolongiou (1966)
- Oi ekdikitai (1966)
- Erotas stin kafti ammo (1966) - Agalos
- Ta skalopatia (1966) - Hristo
- Ekeinos ki ekeini (1967) - Rider
- Cry in the Wind (1967) - Petros Samarakis
- Matomeni gi (1967) - Kostas
- Oedipus the King (1968) - Chorus
- The Magus (1968) - Kapetan
- Katarameni agapi (1968)
- Vareia katara o dihasmos (1968) - Sergeant Ouranis
- Play Dirty (1969) - Kostas Manou
- On Her Majesty's Secret Service (1969) - Kleff (uncredited)
- Hell Boats (1970) - Salvatore
- Cannon for Cordoba (1970) - Campo
- The Martlet's Tale (1970) - Apelis
- N.P. il segreto (1971) - Leali
- The Golden Voyage of Sinbad (1973) - Achmed
- Promised Woman (1975) - Manolis
- That Lucky Touch (1975) - Arab Sheik
- O katadikos (1975) - Peponas
- Caddie (1976) - Peter
- Kostas (1979) - Kostas Andropolous
- Lion of the Desert (1980) - Bu-Matari
- Levkas Man (1981, TV miniseries) - Kotiades
- Island (1989, Short)
