= Dangerous Corner (Wednesday Theatre) =

- Wednesday Theatre episode
- Episode no.: Season 1 Episode 21
- Directed by: Patrick Barton
- Teleplay by: John Warwick
- Based on: Dangerous Corner by J.B. Priestley
- Original air date: 9 June 1965
- Running time: 75 mins

Episode chronology
← Previous "Otherwise Engaged"	Next → "Louise"

"Dangerous Corner" is a 1965 Australian television play based on the play Dangerous Corner by J.B. Priestley. It was filmed in Melbourne.

== Premise ==
A suicide and an empty cigarette case spark an emotional powder keg in a family.

== Cast ==
- Dorothy Bradley as Olwen
- Maxwell Jackson as Robert
- Amanda Fox as Freda
- Judith Arthy as Betty
- David Mitchell as Gordon
- Charles Stanton as Keith
- Sheila Florance as Miss Mockridge
- Keith Lee

== Production ==
Amanda Fox was an English actress who was born when her father was appearing in the original stage production of Dangerous Corner.

== Reception ==
The Sydney Morning Herald wrote that "After 30 years or so the play still has its internal fascination as an ingenious piece of stagecraft, but the present cast was totally unable to recapture the quietly sinister implications of the original production and substituted shouting and overacting."
