= A Woman's Tale =

- Directed by: Paul Cox
- Written by: Paul Cox; Barry Dickins
- Produced by: William T. Marshall (executive); Paul Cox; Santhana K. Naidu
- Starring: Sheila Florance; Gosia Dobrowolska; Norman Kaye; Chris Haywood; Max Gillies; Ernie Gray
- Cinematography: Nino Gaetanno Martinetti
- Edited by: Russell Hurley
- Music by: Paul Grabowsky
- Distributed by: Orion Classics
- Release date: 18 September 1991 (Australia)
- Running time: 93 minutes
- Country: Australia
- Language: English
- Box office: A$49,584 (Australia) $405,137 (US)

A Woman's Tale is a 1991 Australian film directed by Paul Cox and starring Sheila Florance, Gosia Dobrowolska, Norman Kaye, Chris Haywood, Max Gillies and Ernie Gray. It was the final performance of Sheila Florence, who was dying of cancer as the film was being shot. She died, aged 75, nine days after being awarded the 1991 Australian Film Institute Award for Best Actress in a Leading Role.

== Plot ==
Martha is an elderly woman living alone in her flat and dying of cancer. Her love of life leads to an ambivalence about her age; her unique moral code leads to her playing cupid for her friend and nurse Anna and Anna's married lover Peter; her worrisome son Jonathan wants her to move into a home; her neighbour Billy has dementia.

Martha remembers the death of her baby in a bombing attack during World War Two.

She is hospitalised after a serious fall.

== Cast ==
- Sheila Florance as Martha
- Gosia Dobrowolska as Anna
- Norman Kaye as Billy
- Chris Haywood as Jonathan
- Ernie Gray as Peter
- Alex Menglet as Con 2
- Monica Maughan as Billy's daughter
- Max Gillies as Billy's son-in-law
- Tony Llewellyn-Jones as Celebrant
- Victoria Eagger as Nurse 1
- Melita Jurisic as Judy (voice)

== Production ==
Florance had a long relationship with Paul Cox having appeared in his first feature. She wanted to star in a movie and Cox devised the idea, inspired by the story of a woman whose house burned down. Cox later said, "We always used to joke that I would make her a star. When I heard suddenly that she was dying of cancer I visited her immediately. There was no sentimentality or anything on her part—she was an incredible woman—but she said jokingly, “There is still time to turn me into a star, but let's be quick.” I went home and spent three days and three nights writing the script and then with Barry Dickins and Sheila we did another draft."

In August 1990, Florence took a draft of the script with her to England, where she was doing a tour due to her popularity in Prisoner. She became critically ill and was in hospital; she received last rites, but recovered after some operations and returned to Australia to make the film. It was shot over 24 days.

Cox said " She was given eight weeks to live and so we made A Woman's Tale with this hanging over us. This motivated us, of course, but Sheila had a degree of greatness about her. She was a very powerful woman.

Florence died in Melbourne Hospital on 12 October 1991. She had been too ill to attend the AFI ceremony.

== Release ==
The film screened at the Telluride Film Festival.

== Reception ==
=== Box office ===
A Woman's Tale grossed $49,584 at the box office in Australia. The film grossed $405,137 in the United States.

According to Cox in 2001 "The film won an enormous response around the world and still does. It is still being screened in Japan, which is amazing. I don't know who got the money for it, but that's another very dirty business. At the time nobody wanted to know but we ploughed on and finished it and suddenly it is accepted. This saddened me as well. Why couldn't people trust me, why did I have to go through all this trauma? Nobody wanted to back the film. We had no insurance, in fact, after I completed the film I had to sell my house in a hurry otherwise I would have gone totally bankrupt."

=== Critical ===
Roger Ebert added A Woman's Tale to his Great Movies list in 2004.

Variety wrote Florance "carries the film on her frail shoulders."

Jonathan Rosenbaum wrote "I’ve never been much of a Paul Cox fan, but this 1991 feature... is rather special, largely because Cox regular Sheila Florance who, like the character she plays, was dying of cancer over the course of the film is magnificent. Affirmative without being sentimental, this is a deeply absorbing movie with no false notes or wasted motion."

=== Awards ===
In 1992, the film won the Grand Prix for Best Film at Film Fest Gent.

Cox called it one of his favourite films:

It's a homage to a very great and wonderful human being, Sheila Florance. It's very much a film about life, but using death. It's a very daring movie, because you're not allowed to make films like this, playing with a million dollars, making a film about an old woman. That's pretty tricky. All the sentiments are really against it. I didn't have insurance so everything I had was at stake, making this film. I always knew it would work - I had great faith in Sheila and in what we were doing. I judge people by this film, you see. When people cannot understand or appreciate it or the process of making it, I judge them by that. From the film you can only become a more thinking and feeling human being. When I see A Woman's Tale basically being ignored here, that's disgusting, absolutely disgusting. The only bad crits I get are in Australia but the whole world raves about A Woman's Tale, the whole world. Why not be proud of it?
