= The Party (TV play) =

1969 Australian TV play

The Party is a 1969 Australian TV play. It was made by the ABC in Melbourne under the direction of Chris Muir.

It was written for the ABC by the head of Victorian religious broadcasts, John Nicholson. It aired in Melbourne and Sydney on 12 October 1969. It ran for 45 minutes.

== Plot ==
An Everyman has a dinner party where the guests include Martin Luther, Cardinal Manning, Francis of Assisi and Erasmus.

== Cast ==
- Brian James as the host
- Brian Moll as Martin Luther
- Heinrich Hesse as the French priest
- Michael Howley as Cardinal Manning
- John Rickard as Francis of Assisi
- Norman Kaye as Erasmus
