= Cactus (1986 film) =

1986 film

- Film poster
- Directed by: Paul Cox
- Written by: Paul Cox; Bob Ellis
- Produced by: Paul Cox
- Starring: Isabelle Huppert; Robert Menzies
- Cinematography: Yuri Sokol
- Edited by: Tim Lewis
- Release date: 5 September 1986
- Running time: 93 minutes
- Country: Australia
- Language: English
- Budget: A$1,515,000
- Box office: A$73,751 (Australia)

Cactus is a 1986 Australian drama film directed by Paul Cox and starring Isabelle Huppert.

== Plot ==
Colo, a Frenchwoman visiting Australia, is injured in a car accident with her friend Tom. She loses sight in her left eye and her vision in the other eye is threatened. The specialist advises that the left eye must be removed, or she could go completely blind.

Tom asks Robert, a blind friend, to talk to her. Tom and Colo become lovers.

== Cast ==
- Isabelle Huppert as Colo
- Robert Menzies as Robert
- Norman Kaye as Tom
- Monica Maughan as Bea
- Banduk Marika as Banduk (Note: Not Banula Marika, as incorrectly credited in some sources.)
- Sheila Florance as Martha
- Peter Aanensen as George
- Julia Blake as club speaker
- Jean-Pierre Mignon as Jean-Francois
- Ray Marshall as Kevin
- Maurie Fields as Maurie
- Sean Scully as doctor
- Dawn Klingberg as pedestrian
- Kyra Cox as sister
- Tony Llewellyn-Jones as father

== Production ==
The film was inspired by Paul Cox's memory of his mother temporarily going blind when he was a child. He worked on the story for a number of years, then decided he wanted to work with Isabelle Huppert and wrote the script with her in mind. Bob Ellis worked on the script but fought with Cox over the fact it was about a Frenchwoman staying in Australia after a serious accident, and the two men ended their collaboration. Cox wanted to cast Huppert after seeing her in The Lacemaker and offered her the role at the Cannes Film Festival.

Actors Equity objected to Huppert's importation - Equity rules stated a film needed a budget of over $3 million to have a foreign star - but this was overruled after two months of negotiation.

The Australian Film Corporation was a major investor.

Filming took place in October 1985.

== Reception ==
The film screened in Director's Fortnight at Cannes.

== See also ==
- Isabelle Huppert on screen and stage
