= Barry Dickins =

Australian author and playwright (1949–2026)

- Born: 6 November 1949; Reservoir, Melbourne, Victoria, Australia
- Died: 13 July 2026 (aged 76)
- Occupations: Playwright; author; artist; actor; educator; journalist
- Spouse: Sarah Mogridge (div. 2008)
- Children: Louis Dickins
- Writing career
- Notable work: Remember Ronald Ryan

Barry Dickins (6 November 1949 – 13 July 2026) was an Australian author, artist, actor, educator and journalist, probably best known for his historical dramas and his reminiscences about growing up and living in working class Melbourne. His most well-known work is the award-winning stage play Remember Ronald Ryan, a dramatisation of the life and death of Ronald Ryan, the last person executed in Australia. He also wrote dramas and comedies about other controversial figures such as the poet Sylvia Plath, the opera singer Dame Joan Sutherland, criminal Squizzy Taylor, the actor Frank Thring, playwright Oscar Wilde and the artist Brett Whiteley.

Dickins primarily wrote for Australia's independent theatre scene, frequently collaborating with La Mama Theatre, Malthouse Theatre, The Pram Factory, Griffin Theatre Company, fortyfivedownstairs and St Martin Youth Theatre.

== Life and career ==
Dickins was born in the Melbourne suburb of Reservoir on 6 November 1949. Leaving school early he worked for five years in a factory in North Melbourne, and then as a set-painter for television programs being produced at Channel 7. Through his association with La Mama Theatre, his first play, a translation of Ibsen's Ghosts, was performed in 1974. He has written a further 50 since then, along with numerous short stories, biographies, opinion pieces, essays and children's books. His play Remember Ronald Ryan won the 1995 Victorian Premier's Literary Award. He had a long career as an educator, spending 41 years teaching English and creative writing at various schools in Melbourne (including Scotch College, Melbourne Grammar and West Preston Primary School). His experiences in the classroom served as the basis for his 2013 memoirs, Lessons in Humility: 40 years of teaching.

He made numerous appearances on the stage and on the screen. His first acting role was in Barry Oakley's The Ship's Whistles, which was staged in 1978 at the Pram Factory Front Theatre, under the direction of Paul Hampton. Since then he has appeared in: Paul Cox's Man of Flowers (1983); James Clayden's With Time to Kill (1987); Brian McKenzie's With Love to the Person Next to Me (1987); Paul Cox's The Gift (1988; Paul Cox's Golden Braid (1990) (which Dickins also co-wrote); Brian McKenzie's People Who Still Use Milk Bottles (1990); Frank Howson's Flynn (1993); and Elise McCredie's Strange Fits of Passion (1999). He also had guest roles on the television shows Winners (1985) and Wedlocked (1995).

In 1985, he appeared in a revival of Graeme Blundell's Balmain Boys Don't Cry (renamed The Balmain Boys) at the Kinsela's Cabaret Theatre in Darlinghurst, New South Wales. His most recent stage performance was a dramatic reading of the monologue Ryan (a continuation of his earlier work Remember Ronald Ryan), which was performed as part of a QandA event held at Melbourne based bookshop, Collected Works.

In 2009, he published his memoirs Unparalleled Sorrow, which discusses his career and his battle with depression.

2015 saw the publication by Black Pepper publishing of A Line Drawing of My Father, a memoir of the author's father Len Dickins, who served in the Second World War and was a commercial printer thereafter. It also gives a portrait of the working class northern suburbs of Melbourne.

In 2015, Dickins became a Writer-in-Residence and Creative Writing lecturer at Victoria University in Footscray, Melbourne. He held the position for less than 12 months, before being unexpectedly let go by the campus coordinators during the Christmas break.

In June 2017, Dickins was found guilty of making a false police report after claiming officers had conducted an improper strip search upon him on Lygon Street. The full circumstances, according to Dickins, appear not to be available, however, and details in the news article are brief. Dickins was placed on a 12-month good behaviour bond with no conviction recorded. His then employer, The Sunday Age, was later found to have breached Australian Press Council principles in light of their publication of Dickins' account of the alleged police misconduct.

Dickins died on 13 July 2026 at the age of 76.

== Bibliography ==
=== Plays ===
- Ghosts [from Henrik Ibsen] (1975)
- A Season of Five Plays [as contributor] (AGP Women's Theatre Group 1976)
- Only An Old Kitbag (Australian Performing Group 1977)
- The Great Oscar Wilde Trial (La Mama Theatre 1977)
- The Interview (La Mama Theatre 1977)
- The Rotten Teeth Show (Pram Factory Theatre 1978)
- The Bloody Horror of Dentistry (La Mama Theatre 1978)
- The Ken Wright Show (Pram Factory Front Theatre 1980)
- Doing His Thing (Restaurant Upstairs Comedy Cafe Theatre 1980)
- The Banana Bender and The Death of Minnie. (Currency, 1981) ISBN 0-86819-053-5
- Interrogation of an Angel (Playbox Theatre Melbourne 1981)
- The Ability to Eat Crow (Menzies Theatre/Festival of Australian Student Theatre 1981)
- Lennie Lower. (Yackandandah, 1982) ISBN 0-86805-012-1
- A Couple of Broken Hearts (1982)
- God and Geoff (St Martins Theatre 1982)
- A Kingly Crown (St Martins Theatre 1982)
- Graeme King Lear (Playbox Theatre Melbourne 1983)
- One woman shoe. (Yackandandah, 1984) ISBN 0-86805-010-5
- The Bridal Suite and Mag and Bag: Two plays. (Yackandandah, 1985) ISBN 0-86805-040-7
- Beautland. (Currency, 1985) ISBN 0-86819-130-2
- Green Room (La Mama Theatre 1985)
- The Horror of Suburban Nature Strips (Yackandandah 1985)
- Reservoir by Night (Russell Street Theatre 1985)
- The Gummy Man in Search of Love (Griffin Theatre Company 1985)
- The Golden Goldenbergs. (1986)
- More Greenroom (1986)
- Eat Your Greens (La Mama Theatre 1987)
- The Fool's Shoe Hotel. (Yackandandah, 1987) ISBN 0-86805-055-5
- Royboys (Currency, 1987) ISBN 0-86819-177-9
- Bedlam Autos (Russell Street Theatre 1988)
- Between Engagements (La Mama Theatre 1988)
- Perfect English (La Mama Theatre 1990)
- Hymie (La Mama Theatre 1991)
- A Dickins Christmas (Playbox Theatre Melbourne 1992)
- The Foibles (Budinskis Theatre of Exile 1992)
- Funny Fiction at La Mama [with Wendy Harmer, William Henderson & Sue-Ann Post ] (La Mama Theatre/Melbourne International Comedy Festival 1992)
- Dear Suburbia (La Mama Theatre 1992)
- Remember Ronald Ryan (Currency, 1994) ISBN 0-86819-392-5
- Dame Joan Green (La Mama Theatre 1994)
- La Mama 30th Birthday Celebrations [as contributor] (La Mama Theatre 1997)
- Believe Me Oscar Wilde (La Mama Theatre 2000)
- Go in Tight (La Mama Theatre 2001)
- Insouciance (Playbox Theatre Melbourne 2001) ISBN 0868196444
- Claustrophobia (La Mama Theatre 2003)
- All of Which are American Dreams [with Ben Ellis, Melissa Reeves, Robert Reid & Stephen Sewell] (Theatreworks/Theatre in Decay 2003)
- Tyranny (The Builders Initiative/La Mama Theatre 2005)
- Myer Emp (La Mama Theatre 2007)
- The Real Thring (Hoy Polloy/Triple R 2008)
- Flashpoint (fortyfivedownstairs/R. E. Ross Trust 2009)
- Whiteley's Incredible Blue ... an hallucination (fortyfivedownstairs/Melbourne Festival 2011)
- The Way Out: A Masterpiece by a Dead Goblin (La Mama Courthouse 2011)
- A Faboulous Kind of Hatred (fortyfivedownstairs 2013)
- Lost in Ringwood (La Mama Theatre 2013)
- Ryan (La Mama Theatre 2015)
- Speechless (La Mama Theatre 2017)
- The Lost Tangerine Jacket (Riverside Theatres 2018)

=== Musicals ===
- Squizzy [with Faye Bendrups] (Think Big Productions 2010)

=== Screenplays ===
- Golden Braid [with Paul Cox] (1990)
- A Woman's Tale [with Paul Cox] (1991)
- Touch Me [with Paul Cox] (1993)

=== Stories ===
- Post Office Restaurant and Other Stories. (Pascoe, 1992) ISBN 0-947087-19-2

=== Fiction ===
- The Crookes of Epping Pascoe Publishing, 1984. ISBN 0-9592104-3-1
- The Truffle: His life & bump out (Pascoe Publishing 1988) ISBN 0947087109
- The Mouthless Murderer (Victoria Connor Court Publishing 2015) ISBN 9781925138863
- "Barry And The Fairies of Miller Street" 2012

=== Non fiction ===
- The Gift of the Gab: Stories from the life of Barry Dickins. (1981; Penguin, 1987) ISBN 0-14-010866-1
- What the Dickins! A symposium of pieces from the low life (Penguin, 1985) ISBN 0-14-007253-5
- You'll Only Go In for Your Mates. (Allen & Unwin, 1991) ISBN 1-86373-147-4
- I Love To Live: The Fabulous Life of Barry Dickins (Penguin Books 1991) ISBN 014013350X
- The Australasian Post Great Aussie Beer Guide [with Maurie Fields] (1994)
- Guts and Pity: The Hanging that ended Capital Punishment in Australia. (Currency Press, 1996) ISBN 0-86819-424-7
- The House of the Lord (Vintage 1999) ISBN 9781863305624
- Ordinary Heroes: Personal Recollections of Australians at War (Hardie Grant 1999)
- Heart and Soul : personal recollections of life in the police force [as editor] (Hardie Grant 2000) ISBN 186498077X (pbk.)
- Articles of Light: Reflections on lowlifes, ratbags and angels. (Penguin, 2000) ISBN 0-14-029752-9
- Black and Whiteley: Barry Dickins in search of Brett (Hardie Grant Books, 2002) ISBN 1-74064-001-2 Review
- Unparalleled Sorrow : finding my way back from depression (Hardie Grant 2009) ISBN 9781740668033
- Charles Blackman [with Ken McGregor] (Macmillan Art 2010) ISBN 9781921394355
- Miniatures: Famous and Anonymous Souls I Collided With (Flat Chat Press, 2010) ISBN 978-1-921142-57-4
- Barry and the Fairies of Miller Street with Lee, J (Hardie Grant Books 2012) ISBN 978-1-742703-71-8
- Lessons in Humility : 40 years of Teaching (Connor Court Publishing 2013) ISBN 9781922168009
- Footy Works: Australian Football (AFL Media 2014) ISBN 9780992363185
- A Line Drawing of my Father (Black Pepper Publishing 2015)
- Heartfelt Moments in Australian Rules Football [as contributor] (Connor Court Publishing 2016) ISBN 9781925138948
- Last Words: The Hanging of Ronald Ryan (Hardie Grant 2017) ISBN 9781743792780
- La Mama [as contributor] (The Miegunyah Press 2017) ISBN 0522871569
- One Punch: The Tragic Toll of Random Acts of Violence (Hardie Grant Books 2020) ISBN 9781743795712

=== Children's books ===
- My grandmother. (Penguin, 1989) ISBN 0-14-012283-4
- My grandfather: Years of hope and vigour. (Penguin, 1993) ISBN 0-14-017859-7
- Joey: A dog for all seasons. (Puffin, 1995) ISBN 0-14-037091-9
- The Three Wise Blokes (Salvation Army, 2016) ISBN 9780994464408

=== Verse ===
- In Light: poems (Melbourne Footscray Community Arts Centre 1978) ISBN 0908109083
- See What I'm Talking About [as contributor] (La Mama Poetica, 2009)

=== As illustrator ===
- The Barracker's Bible [anthology compiled by Jack Hibberd & Garrie Hutchinson; co-Illustrated with Noel Counihar] (McPhee Gribble Publishers 1983) ISBN 0869140280, 9780869140284
- Ten tales for republicans [by Allan Drummond] (Green Barrow 2000) ISBN 1876460954
