= Linda Aronson =

Australian screenwriter, educator and author

- Born: 20 March 1950 (age 75); United Kingdom
- Occupations: Screenwriter, author
- Years active: 1979–present
- Notable work: Kostas

Linda Aronson (born 20 March 1950) is a British-born Australian screenwriter, educator and author. She wrote the AACTA-nominated drama Kostas and several television series, such as Something in the Air and G.P.

Born in London, Aronson moved out to Essex at a young age. She studied at Ulster University, then did late nineteenth century fiction at Oxford University, but abandoned it to pursue a career as a writer. Her first paid writing job was a 1973 radio adaptation of her own stage play, Closing Down for ABC. This was followed by Cafe in a Side Street in 1975, and The Fall Guy in 1976. The latter success lead to her writing Kostas.

== The 21st Century Screenplay ==
Aronson is also a prolific author, having written several books including the screenwriting guide The 21st Century Screenplay. The book was written as a response to standard screenwriting teaching that focused on linear, single protagonist stories. Aronson, instead, discusses how to write for non-linear stories with multiple characters.
