= The Villa =

Reality television series

The Villa is a reality television series, originally produced by Talent TV from 1999, and aired on Sky1 for four series until 2003. Reruns previously aired on Fox Reality until this station closed. The Dutch version ran sporadically until 2019, when it was cancelled due to a case of sexual assault.

== Format ==
Executive Produced for Sky by Jamie Robert, The Villa took four men and four women, computer-matched for compatibility, and flew them from the United Kingdom and Ireland to an exotic Spanish villa for a week of fun and activities in and around the Costa Del Sol. Cameras would follow the players around all week in Big Brother style, to see if the computer matched the right couples or if it was wrong.

Voiced by Mark Little, the show featured student age participants, so involved a lot of snogging, fumbling, drinking and Brits behaving badly. The "players" were typically easy on the eye, and spent the week teasing each other but rarely actually hooking up for the cameras.

At the end of the week, the computer's matches are revealed to see if the couples paired off the way it predicted.

== Incidents on the Dutch version ==
In 2011 a Dutch production of The Villa was broadcast on RTL 5. Original eight episodes of De Villa were scheduled but one episode was withdrawn because one of the contestants appeared to be a convicted murderer. The show was recorded in Lloret de Mar. Following De Villa six episodes of New Chicks: Brabantse Nachten op Curaçao were broadcast by RTL 5. This show was based on the fourth season of British The Villa and was hosted by Nikkie Plessen and recorded on Curaçao. The original British series aired earlier on Dutch television.

=== Broadcast of sexual assault scene and cancellation ===
In 2019, in a revamped version of the show, two male contestants sexually assaulted two female contestants. Both scenes of the assaults were broadcast, which led to severe public outrage. As a result of that, broadcaster RTL pulled the plug of the show and deleted the episode from its online streaming service. After the cancellation, it was revealed that contestants claimed that the production company had pushed them to conduct "unacceptable behaviour". Responding to that, RTL programme director Peter van der Vorst axed all the channel's reality series, including Love Island, Temptation Island and Free Love Paradise.
