= Golden Braid =

- Directed by: Paul Cox
- Written by: Paul Cox; Barry Dickins
- Based on: story La Chevelure by Guy de Maupassant
- Starring: Chris Haywood; Gosia Dobrowolska; Paul Chubb; Jo Kennedy
- Production companies: Film Victoria; Australian Film Commission; Illumination Films
- Distributed by: Beyond
- Release date: February 1991
- Running time: 87 minutes
- Country: Australia
- Language: English
- Budget: A$900,000

Golden Braid is a 1991 Australian film about a man who masturbates with a braid of old hair he finds in an antique cupboard, directed by Paul Cox. Cox later called it "quite a funny film, but very few people get it."

It was entirely funded by the Australian Film Commission.

== Plot ==
Bernard is a clockmaker who is having an affair with Terese, a Salvation Army worker married to Joseph. He muses about the emotional connections humans form with antiques. He then finds a golden braid of a woman's hair in an 18th-century cabinet and becomes obsessed with it. While becoming more distant from Terese, Bernard secretly strokes the hair, whispers to it and ultimately masturbates by putting the hair around his penis. Eventually, he is able to move on and reconcile with Terese.

== Cast ==
- Chris Haywood as Bernard
- Gosia Dobrowolska as Terese
- Paul Chubb as Joseph
- Jo Kennedy as Diana
- Harold Baigent as Clockmaker
- Sheila Florance as Lady with Clock
- Mark Little as Punk
- Norman Kaye as Psychiatrist
- Monica Maughan as Antique Shop Owner
- Victoria Eagger as Shop Assistant

== Awards ==
The film received five nominations at the 1990 AFI Awards: Best Director, Best Original Screenplay, Best Cinematography, Best Editing, and Best Sound.
