= Diana & Me =

- Directed by: David Parker
- Written by: Matt Ford
- Based on: a screenplay by Elizabeth Coleman
- Starring: Toni Collette
- Release date: December 4, 1999
- Country: Australia
- Language: English
- Box office: $205,783 (Australia)

Diana & Me is a 1997 Australian romantic comedy film directed by David Parker and starring Toni Collette, Dominic West and John Simm.

== Plot ==
An Australian named Diana Spencer travels to London to try to get a glimpse of her namesake, Diana, Princess of Wales. Just as she is about to shake hands with the princess, she is pushed out of the way by a photographer. While she is furious with him at first, they slowly strike up a relationship.

== Production ==
The original script was by Elizabeth Coleman. According to David Parker, the original female lead was older and more like Shirley Valentine. Parker then worked on the script with Matt Ford for 18 months.

Shooting finished in December 1996 and post-production was completed by Easter 1997 for a release planned for August. These plans were thrown into confusion when Princess Diana was killed in a car accident on 31 August 1997. Parker and Ford spent six weeks reworking the film, adding some new sequences and narration. David Parker later said:

There was nowhere to go with that film. We did shoot a new little top and tail for it primarily to place the movie within the past so that it would at least work chronologically. But it appeared it wasn't enough. We either came out too early with it or such was the response to Princess Diana in life and death that we were completely on the wrong page, a film that could be released only after her death.

== Cast ==
- Toni Collette as Diana Spencer
- Dominic West as Rob Naylor
- Malcolm Kennard as Mark Fraser
- Victoria Eagger as Carol
- John Simm as Neil
- Serena Gordon as Lady Sarah Myers-Booth
- Roger Barclay as Richard
- Tom Hillier as Neville
- David Baldwin as Dog Owner
- Victoria Longley as Pauline Challinor
- Marshall Napier as Bank Manager
- Penne Hackforth-Jones as Pollock
- William Zappa as Phil
- Jim Holt as Detective
- Nigel Planer as Taxi Driver
- Celia Dickinson as Katie
- Michael Miller as Michael - Owner of Cafe Diana
- John Turnbull as AA Man
- Deborah Conway as herself
- Mike Robinson as Restaurant Manager
- Paula Arundell as Constable
- Kylie Minogue as herself
- Bob Geldof as himself
