= Kimberley Davenport =

Australian actress

- Occupation: Actress

Kimberley Davenport is a New Zealand-born actress based in Australia. She moved into acting after she was discovered boarding a tram and was cast in a Models video clip. She played the lead role in Hungry Heart, and featured in the TV series Chances and Echo Point. On stage she appeared in Melbourne Theatre Company's Sunday Lunch in 1991.
