= Lonely Hearts (1982 film) =

- DVD cover
- Directed by: Paul Cox
- Written by: Paul Cox; John Clarke
- Produced by: John B. Murray
- Starring: Wendy Hughes; Norman Kaye
- Cinematography: Yuri Sokol
- Edited by: Tim Lewis
- Music by: Norman Kaye
- Production company: Adams-Packer
- Distributed by: Filmways Australasian Distributors
- Release date: 1982
- Running time: 95 minutes
- Country: Australia
- Language: English
- Budget: A$690,000

Lonely Hearts is a 1982 Australian film directed by Paul Cox which won the 1982 AFI Award for Best Film and was nominated in four other categories.

== Plot ==
Shortly after the death of his mother, middle-aged Peter realizes how lonely he is. Hoping to find adventure, he signs on with a dating agency in search of a companion. Peter is introduced to a shy bank clerk, Patricia. Patricia is younger than Peter but is also lonely, having endured smothering parents.

== Cast ==
- Wendy Hughes as Patricia Curnow
- Norman Kaye as Peter Thompson
- Jon Finlayson as George
- Julia Blake as Pamela
- Jonathan Hardy as Bruce
- Irene Inescort as Patricia's mother
- Vic Gordon as Patricia's father
- Ted Grove-Rogers as Peter's father
- Kris McQuade as Rosemarie
- Maurie Fields as Taxi Driver
- Pepe Trevor

== Production ==
Paul Cox wrote the first two drafts, then Phillip Adams proposed the movie be the first of four films made by the Adams-Packer company. John Clarke was brought in to co-write and John Murray became producer. Cox was paid $30,000 which he says was the first payment he ever received for making a film.

The film was shot over six weeks with two weeks for rehearsal.

== Release ==
The film was extremely well received and screened widely overseas, establishing Cox's reputation.

Bob Ellis later argued that the movie was Cox's best because more time and care was put into it with less improvisation. "It had a producer, a director, a script editor, you know, the usual apparatus and, of course, it's a full and wonderful film. His other ones are like brief, infinitely prolonged screams or sonatas or something..."

== Home media ==
Lonely Hearts was released on DVD by Umbrella Entertainment in August 2007. The DVD is compatible with all region codes and includes special features such as the theatrical trailer and interviews with Paul Cox, John Clarke and Wendy Hughes.

== See also ==
- Cinema of Australia
