= Lust and Revenge =

- Directed by: Paul Cox
- Written by: Paul Cox; John Clarke
- Starring: Nicholas Hope; Gosia Dobrowolska; Claudia Karvan; Chris Haywood
- Release date: 1996
- Country: Australia
- Language: English
- Box office: A$170,000 (Australia)

Lust and Revenge is a 1996 film directed by Paul Cox. It was shot in South Australia.

The movie was the last film performance of John Hargreaves.

== Plot ==
Georgina Oliphant (Claudia Karvan) commissions her friend Lily Carmichael (Victoria Eagger) to create a sculpture for a new wing at the National Gallery. Georgina's wealthy father George (Chris Haywood), who owns a pharmaceutical company, is giving her daughter the money so he can use it as a tax deduction.

Karl Heinz (Nicholas Hope) is chosen as the model for the sculpture and plans to use his $10,000 fee to put a down payment on a cottage. His wife Celia (Gosia Dobrowolska) is not enthusiastic about Karl posing and is caught up in a new age religion led by Baba Charles (Norman Kaye). Celia wants Karl to ask George for money for her religion.

Georgina has a history of mental instability. One night she attacks the house of her ex-husband and her therapist puts her on a new medication. It causes Georgina's libido to increase and she seduces Karl.

== Cast ==
- Nicholas Hope as Karl-Heinz Applebaum
- Gosia Dobrowolska as Cecilia Applebaum
- Claudia Karvan as Georgina Oliphant
- Victoria Eagger as Lily Carmichael
- Chris Haywood as George Oliphant
- Norman Kaye as Baba Charles
- Ulli Birvé as Anna
- Wendy Hughes as George's Advisor
- John Hargreaves as Gallery Sleaze
- Robert Menzies as therapist

== Production ==
Cox had intended to make a film Suicide of a Gentleman but Film Victoria decided not to finance the film arguing it had invested $1,224,000 into his last four films and received very little in return. Cox had a crisis of confidence. He then wrote a first draft of Lust and Revenge which was received positively by the head of the South Australian Film Corporation. Cox brought in John Clarke, with whom he had collaborated on Lonely Hearts to work on the script. The film was shot over five weeks in Adelaide in August 1995. Wendy Hughes made a cameo in drag.

== Reception ==
Cox was nominated for Best Director at the 1996 AFI Awards.

The Sun Herald said the film was Cox's "most accessible in years... isn't especially memorable - it's a mood piece."

Cox later said "I think it should have been much more popular in Australia, actually, because it is quite accurate about the whole operation here."
