= Illuminations (film) =

- Directed by: Paul Cox
- Written by: Paul Cox
- Produced by: Tibor Markus
- Starring: Gabriella Trsek
- Cinematography: Paul Cox; Brian Gracey
- Edited by: Paul Cox; Russell Hurley
- Release date: 7 May 1976
- Running time: 74 mins
- Country: Australia
- Language: English
- Budget: A$31,000

Illuminations is a 1976 Australian film directed by Paul Cox. It was Cox's first full-length feature film although he had made numerous shorts beforehand.

== Plot ==
A couple living together have a tense relationship. The woman's father dies and she becomes preoccupied with death. She almost drowns in the bath but then recovers her enthusiasm for life.

== Cast ==
- Gabriella Trsek as Gabi
- Tony Llewellyn-Jones as Tony
- Norman Kaye as Gabi's father
- Sheila Florance
- Athol Shmith
- Tibor Markus
- Robert Trauer
- Elke Neidhardt
- Fabian Muir
- Alena Leiss
- Christopher Stewart
- Dora Stubenrauch
- Ilona Enten
- John Williams

== Production ==
The film was inspired by a dream Paul Cox had in the early 1970s about being trapped in a coffin, seeing people who he had known all his life.

$16,000 of the budget came through the Film, Radio and Television Board of the Australia Council, with the rest from private investment. It was released through Melbourne Co-operatives but never recovered its cost.
