= Victoria Eagger =

Australian actress (active 1979– )

- Citizenship: Australian
- Education: National Institute of Dramatic Art (1986); Rusden College
- Occupation: Actress
- Years active: 1979–present
- Known for: Janus; The Librarians

Victoria Eagger is an Australian actress.

== Early life and education ==
Eagger studied at National Institute of Dramatic Art (NIDA), graduating with a Diploma of Dramatic Art in Acting in 1986. She also trained at Rusden College in Melbourne.

== Career ==
After small early roles in Man of Flowers (1983), A Woman's Tale (1991), and Golden Braid (1991), Eagger had major supporting roles in 1996 comedy-drama Lust and Revenge (playing Lili Carmichael alongside Claudia Karvan) and 2000 romantic comedy Diana & Me (as Carol, opposite Toni Collette and Dominic West). She subsequently appeared in 2003 western drama Ned Kelly with Heath Ledger and Orlando Bloom, 2009 horror film The Loved Ones alongside Xavier Samuel and 2010 drama Matching Jack with Jacinda Barrett and James Nesbitt.

On television, Eagger had a supporting role in legal drama Janus as Rhonda Hennessey, from 1994 to 1995. She had an ongoing role in Something in the Air in 2001, playing Lorraine McGregor. She also was part of the main cast of comedy series The Librarians, for its third season, as Frances O'Brien's mother Pearl, for which she won (along with her fellow cast members), Most Outstanding Performance by an Ensemble in a Comedy Series at the first Equity Ensemble Awards.

On stage, Eagger has featured in numerous productions, including Drums of Thunder (1988, Belvoir), The Road to Mecca (1989, Russell Street Theatre), Call of the Wild (1990, Belvoir), Baby, Honey. Thirteen Studies in Exile (1995, La Mama), Sweet Road (2000, Merlyn Theatre and Space Theatre), Salt (2001, Playbox), and Only the End (2005, La Mama)

Eagger undertook a two year term as Artistic Coordinator at Melbourne Theatre Company in the early 1990s, and worked for overseas theatre companies including International Theatre Laboratory and Georgian Actors' Studio.

== Filmography ==
=== Film ===
Year	Title	Role	Notes	Ref.
1983	Man of Flowers	Angela		
1990	Golden Braid	Shop Assistant		
1991	A Woman's Tale	Nurse 1		
1992	The Nun and the Bandit	Maureen		
1996	Lust and Revenge	Lili Carmichael		
1997	Amy	Jeanette Chandler		
1999	Siam Sunset	Rowena Wentworth		
1999	The Coat		Short film	
2000	Diana & Me	Carol		
2000	Mallboy	Yvonne		
2003	Ned Kelly	Mrs Shelton		
2009	Fences	Karen	Short film	
2009	The Loved Ones	Judith		
2010	Matching Jack	Nurse Brackston		
2011	Husband, Father, Son	Karen	Short film	
2015	Force of Destiny	Nurse		

=== Television ===
Year	Title	Role	Notes	Ref.
1982–1983	Prisoner	Brenda Thomas / Shop Assistant	3 episodes	
1984	Carson's Law	Elizabeth Beaumont	1 episode	
1988	The Gift	Librarian	TV movie	
1989	A Country Practice	Pam Webb	2 episodes	
1991	Kelly	Reporter	1 episode	
1993–1994	R.F.D.S.	Georgie Madden	5 episodes	
1994–1995	Janus	Rhonda Hennessey	8 episodes	
1995; 1996	Blue Heelers	Sarah Wickham / Grace Macdonald	2 episodes	
1996	Halifax f.p.	Pam	1 episode	
1996	Snowy River: The McGregor Saga	Woman in Black	1 episode	
1997	Good Guys, Bad Guys	Mia Bassett	1 episode	
1999	State Coroner	Lynette McKechnie	1 episode	
1999	Queen Kat, Carmel & St Jude	Cynthia Torres	Miniseries, 3 episodes	
2000–2004	Stingers	Senior Sgt Sue Thomas / Bernice Doyle / Candy	3 episodes	
2001	Something in the Air	Lorraine McGregor	16 episodes	
2002; 2003	MDA	Coroner	2 episodes	
2003	The Secret Life of Us	Jan Hutchins	1 episode	
2004	Fergus McPhail	Imelda Sponge	1 episode	
2004	Silver Sun	Commodore Sorenson		
2008	East of Everything	Yoga Student	1 episode	
2008	All Saints	Pauline Da Souza	1 episode	
2008	Valentine's Day	Barmaid	TV movie	
2007–2010	The Librarians	Pearl O'Leary	10 episodes	
2008	Underbelly	Wendy Pierce	1 episode	
2008–2009	The Elephant Princess	Maha	4 episodes	
2012	Miss Fisher's Murder Mysteries	Miss Gay	1 episode	
2012	Tangle	Nurse Fiona	2 episodes	
2013	Underbelly: Squizzy	Watch House Matron	2 episodes	
2017	Newton's Law	Justice Gloria Stokes	Miniseries, 1 episode	
2017	Sisters	Tilda	1 episode	
2019	Five Bedrooms	Val Gunther	4 episodes	
2025	Apple Cider Vinegar	Nurse Victoria	Miniseries, 1 episode	

== Theatre ==
=== As actor ===
Year	Title	Role	Notes	Ref.
1979	Honky Donk Debu Tonk		Rusden College, Melbourne	
1980	The Restaurant		Rusden College, Melbourne	
1981	The Appointment		La Mama, Melbourne	
1981	Catch Phases		Rusden College, Melbourne, One-C-One, Melbourne	
1981	Peggy Sue		La Mama, Melbourne	
1983	Dance in the Ashes	Isabella	Church Theatre, Melbourne with Australian Contemporary Theatre Co	
1985	Hedda Gabler		NIDA Theatre, Sydney	
1985	Fitting for Ladies (Tailleur Pour Dames)		NIDA Theatre, Sydney	
1986	No Trifling With Love		NIDA Theatre, Sydney	
1986	The Golden Age	Angel	NIDA Theatre, Sydney	
1986	The Accrington Pals		NIDA Theatre, Sydney	
1986	Trelawny of the Wells	Miss Trafalgar	NIDA Theatre, Sydney	
1987	A Lie of the Mind	Sally	Russell St Theatre, Melbourne with MTC	
1987	The Cherry Orchard	Varya	Anthill Theatre, Melbourne	
1988	Drums of Thunder		Belvoir St Theatre, Sydney	
1989	The Road to Mecca	Elsa	Russell St Theatre, Melbourne with MTC	
1989	Heart for the Future	Helen	Playhouse, Melbourne with MTC	
1989–1990	Call of the Wild		Church Theatre, Melbourne, Belvoir St Theatre, Sydney with Australian Contemporary Theatre Co	
1991	The Woman in the Dunes		La Mama, Melbourne	
1991	Working Out		Fairfax Studio, Melbourne with Victorian Arts Centre	
1992	Suitcases in a 1000 Room Hotel: Like Whiskey on the Breath of a Drunk You Love / Pandemonium / Ned / Confessions of a Quiet Girl / Goat / Wall Street Creche		Anthill Theatre, Melbourne	
1993	The Master and Margarita		Napier St Theatre, Melbourne	
1994	Unsettled: At Dusk / No Family / Seeing Violet		Napier St Theatre, Melbourne	
1995	The Truth Game		MTC Rehearsal Studio with Centre Stage	
1995	Mariage Blanc		Napier St Theatre, Melbourne	
1995	Baby, Honey: Thirteen Studies in Exile / An Amorous Discourse in the Suburbs of Hell		La Mama, Melbourne	
1995	Elsinore		Napier St Theatre, Melbourne	
1996	Double or Nothing		Napier St Theatre, Melbourne	
1999	Fred	Antoinette	Fairfax Theatre, Melbourne with MTC	
2000	Sweet Road	Jo	Merlyn Theatre, Melbourne, Space Theatre, Adelaide with Playbox Theatre & STCSA	
2001	Salt	Meg	Beckett Theatre, Melbourne with Playbox Theatre	
2002	The Bridge		Butter Factory Theatre, Wodonga with HotHouse Theatre	
2002	Mum's the Word		The Capital, Bendigo	
2005	Only the End		La Mama, Melbourne	

=== As devisor / director ===
Year	Title	Role	Notes	Ref.
1980	Mine Are Irritations	Devisor	Pram Factory, Melbourne	
1992	Suitcases in a 1000 Room Hotel: Like Whiskey on the Breath of a Drunk You Love / Pandemonium / Ned / Confessions of a Quiet Girl / Goat / Wall Street Creche	Director	Anthill Theatre, Melbourne	
1995	Shorts Programme: Ned	Director	Fairfax Studio, Melbourne with MTC	
1995	Shorts Programme: This Property is Condemned / Love / Family Running For Mr Whippy / Like Whiskey on the Breath of a Drunk You Love	Director	Fairfax Studio, Melbourne with MTC	
1996	Double or Nothing	Devisor	Napier St Theatre, Melbourne	
1998	Are We There Yet?	Director	Victoria Vista Hotel, Melbourne	
