= Theatre in Decay =

Theatre in Decay is an independent theatre company operating in Melbourne, Australia. It was founded in 2000 by Robert Reid and Anniene Stockton. Theatre in Decay has produced over 30 unfunded original shows in venues such as Arts Centre Melbourne, The Store Room, La Mama and Theatreworks, as well as pubs, subways, hotel bedrooms, city rooftops, alleys and inside cars parked on the street.

== History ==
Theatre in Decay had its most active period between 2000 and 2004, during which time it produced 23 full-scale productions, two cabaret-style reviews, two performance installations, two art exhibitions and two ‘zines. In the years following this period Theatre in Decay toured two shows to Adelaide Fringe and produced a puppet show for the Short and Sweet 10-minute play festival.

Stockton and Reid formed Theatre in Decay as a direct response to what they saw as an industry wide malaise. In their original 2000 manifesto, entitled "This isn’t Art, it’s War", they declared “We believe that theatre has nothing to do with money. That live performance is much more than just pretty costumes and impressive sets. Theatre can happen anywhere, all it needs is an audience.”

Together they developed a style of working specifically tailored to the chaotic environment of pub band stages and urban environments. Reid was quoted in an interview for stageleft being denied access to the stages of the world turned "entire cities into our stage.”

Theatre in Decay was an early company amongst the independent theatre community in Melbourne contemporary with companies such as Stuck Pigs Squealing, Theatre@Risk, and Red Stitch Actors.

== Shows ==
Concepts for works by Theatre in Decay are developed by Reid and Stockton and generally written and directed by Reid, with notable exceptions being Another Sun, written by Adam Cass and All of Which are American Dreams, written in collaboration with Stephen Sewell, Barry Dickins, Mellissa Reeves and Ben Ellis.

Significant shows for Theatre in Decay included:

Sad Bird-Boy and the Scalpel-Fingered Girl: Created as a support piece to Amanda Palmers' band The Dresden Dolls. Sad Bird-Boy was first staged an entry to the 2005 Melbourne Short and Sweet ten-minute play festival held at The Victorian Arts Centre, Sad Bird-Boy and the Scalpel-Fingered Girl is a dark fantasy of conformity and escapism. It received both the Best Production by an Independent Theatre Company and The Best Overall Performance awards. It was written by Reid and directed by Jason Lehane.

Empire: Presented at the 2004 Melbourne Fringe Festival and again at the 2006 Adelaide Fringe Festival. Empire is staged in a car parked on the street with two actors in the front seat and a maximum of three audience in the back seat. It deals with issues of terrorism, racism and notions of "mateship". Five different cars were used simultaneously in 2004, directed by Ian Pidd, David Myles, Nic Velissaris, Wayne Chappel and Xan Coleman and four in 2006 directed by Bec Russel, Clare Watson, Robert Reid and Xan Coleman.

Sweet Staccato Rising: Presented at The Store Room in 2004 as part of their first InStorage season, Sweet Staccato Rising explores issues of adolescent confusion, media politics and suburban boredom. It was written by Reid and directed by Lauren Taylor.

A Mile in Her Shadow: Originally produced at The Store Room as part of their inaugural Store Room Theatre Workshop series, A Mile in Her Shadow explores depression, depersonalisation and other stress related mental health issues. Written by Reid it was originally directed by Ben Harkin and has subsequently been supported by the R. E. Ross Trust Development award, and presented at the 33rd Australian National Playwright Centre's Conference.

All of Which are American Dreams: Presented at Theatreworks in 2003, All of Which are American Dreams was a response to Australia's involvement in the 2003 invasion and occupation of Iraq. Written in collaboration with playwrights Stephen Sewell, Barry Dickins, Melissa Reeves, Robert Reid and Ben Ellis, the three-act bouffant-influenced performance explored the potential implications of Australia's military involvement using the metaphor of a travelling circus. It was directed by Jason Lehane and Yvonne Virsik.
