= Martha (1964 film) =

1964 Australian television play

- Directed by: Christopher Muir
- Written by: Friedrich von Flotow
- Produced by: Christopher Muir
- Starring: Norman Kaye
- Music by: Victorian Orchestra, conducted by Eric Clapham
- Release date: 1964
- Running time: 90 minutes
- Country: Australia
- Language: English

Martha is a 1964 Australian television play. It is a filmed production of Friedrich von Flotow's opera of the same name, directed by Christopher Muir.

== Cast ==
- Barbara Wilson as Lady Harriet Durham / Martha
- Dorothy O'Donahoo as Nancy / Julia
- Alan Eddy as Sir Tristram Mickleford
- Norman Kaye as Lionel
- Brian Hansford as Plunkett
- Victor Franklin as voice of Lionel
- Dzintars Veide as Mayor

== Synopsis ==
In 18th century England, Lady Harriet (Barbara Wilson), a bored lady-in-waiting to Queen Anne, tires of the attentions of Sir Tristram Mickleford (Alan Eddy). She has arranged to meet Sir Tristram at Richmond Fair but together with her friend Nancy, they pose as young maids 'Martha' and 'Julia'. In a case of mistaken identity, the girls find themselves bought by wealthy young farmer Plunkett (Brian Hansford) and his foster brother Lionel (Norman Kaye). Harriet and Lionel fall in love, believing each other to be peasants.

== Arias ==
- The Last Rose of Summer
- The Drinking Song
- Spinning Chorus

== Reception ==
The 2 July 1964 edition of Sydney Morning Herald said "the effortless flow of bright and amiably sentimental music in Flotow's "Martha" made the 90 minutes of this opera pass agreeably enough".
