= Kostas (film) =

- Directed by: Paul Cox
- Written by: Linda Aronson
- Produced by: Kostas Kallergis
- Starring: Takis Emmanuel; Wendy Hughes; Norman Kaye
- Edited by: John Scott
- Production companies: Victorian Film Corporation; Illumination Films
- Distributed by: Greg Lynch Film Distributors
- Release dates: 1 June 1979 (premiere); 16 August 1979 (release)
- Running time: 104 mins (original); 93 mins (release)
- Country: Australia
- Language: English
- Budget: A$224,000

Kostas is a 1979 film directed by Paul Cox about a Greek taxi driver.

== Premise ==
A Greek immigrant to Australia has a relationship with an Australian woman, Carol.

== Cast ==
- Takis Emmanuel as Kostas
- Wendy Hughes as Carol
- Kris McQuade as Jenny
- Graeme Blundell as John
- Maurie Fields as Taxi Driver
- Norman Kaye as Passenger
- Dawn Klingberg as Landlady

== Production ==
The film was shot over four weeks in March 1979. $100,000 of the budget came from the Victorian Film Corporation.

== Release ==
Post-production on the film was rushed so Cox could ready it in time for the Melbourne Film Festival, which he later said was a mistake. However, it was the best-received of all Cox's features to that point.

The film opened the Melbourne International Film Festival in 1979. The Canberra Times wrote "Takis Emmanuel's moving portrayal of the hero s plight, Cox's sensitive photography and the sentimental happy ending should make the film a hit with expatriate Australians in Athens and the Greek community in Melbourne."

The film was released to cinemas in Canberra in 1984.
