= Nirvana Street Murder =

- Directed by: Aleksi Vellis
- Written by: Aleksi Vellis
- Starring: Mark Little; Ben Mendelsohn; Sheila Florance; Mary Coustas; Russell Gilbert
- Release date: 1990
- Running time: 75 minutes
- Country: Australia
- Language: English
- Box office: $126,028 (Australia))

Nirvana Street Murder is a 1990 Australian comedy film, written and directed by Aleksi Vellis, starring Mark Little, Ben Mendelsohn, Sheila Florance, Mary Coustas and Russell Gilbert.

== Plot ==
Brothers Luke (Ben Mendelsohn) and Boady (Mark Little) become conflicted after Boady goes on the run from the law, and Luke has an affair with a Greek woman (Mary Coustas) while taking care of a rich elderly woman (Sheila Florance) who could be their financial way out.

== Cast ==
- Ben Mendelsohn as Luke
- Mark Little as Boady
- Mary Coustas as Helen
- Tamara Saulwick as Penny
- Sheila Florance as Molly
- Russell Gilbert as Boss
- Daniel Pollock as Derek
- Roberto Micale as Hector
- George Zach as Jim
- David Roberts as Policeman
- John Flaus as Policeman
- Dennis Dragonas as the stern Greek patriarch

== Filming locations ==
The film was shot in Melbourne CBD and suburbs, including the following locations: P & R Meats, the Westgarth Primary School, the Victoria Park Primary School, the Collingwood Football Club, the Footscray Community Arts Centre, Melbourne Zoo, Roma Coffee Bar, the Shrine of Remembrance, the Royal Botanic Gardens Victoria and Lennox Swan Pharmacy.

== Production ==
The film was billed as a 'Vellis/Cochrane Production' and was funded by the Creative Development Branch of the Australian Film Commission. The Australian distributor was New Vision Films.

== Theatrical release ==
The film premiered at the 1990 Melbourne International Film Festival, and then opened at the Kino in Melbourne on 24 May 1991. It opened in Sydney on 30 May 1991 at the Valhalla, followed by the Academy Twin on Sunday 2 June 1991.

== Box office ==
Film Victoria reported a return of A$126,028 (equivalent to A$199,124 in 2009), against a total budget of $250,000.

== Awards ==
The film received an award for a 'new Australian film' at the 1990 Frames/SAFIAC Awards, held in Adelaide. Director Aleksi Vellis won the inaugural Greg Tepper Memorial Award in 1992, based on his notable contribution to Victorian film-making.

The film screened at the 1990 Melbourne International Film Festival and Sydney Film Festival. Internationally the film screened at several film festivals, including London Film Festival and Toronto International Film Festival.

== See also ==
- Cinema of Australia
