= Promised Woman =

- Directed by: Tom Cowan
- Written by: Tom Cowan
- Based on: the play Throw Away Your Harmonica by Theo Patrikareas
- Produced by: Tom Cowan; Richard Brennan
- Starring: Yelena Zigon; Takis Emmanuel
- Cinematography: Tom Cowan
- Edited by: David Stiven
- Music by: Vissail Daramaras
- Production company: B.C. Productions
- Release dates: March 1975 (premiere); 3 December 1976 (release); April 1977 (Greece)
- Running time: 84 mins
- Country: Australia
- Language: English
- Budget: A$80,000 or $70,000

Promised Woman is a 1975 Australian film from director Tom Cowan.

== Plot ==
Antigone arrives in Sydney from Greece to have an arranged marriage with Telis, but is rejected by him as he expected a younger woman. Telis's older brother, Manolis, sympathises with Antigone.

== Cast ==
- Yelena Zigon as Antigone
- Takis Emmanuel as Manolis
- Nikos Gerissimou as Telis
- Kate Fitzpatrick as Marge
- Darcy Waters as Ken
- Carmel Cullen as Helen
- George Valaris as Nick
- Alex Alexandrou as Basil
- Thea Sevastos as Elpitha
- Christos Lazanis as best man

== Production ==
Tom Cowan had long been interested in the experiences of Greek migrants in Australia, previously making the short Helena of Sydney. He got the idea from making a film about a bride brought to Australia without ever having met the man she would marry from a Greek journalist.

The script was based on a play by Greek writer Theo Patrikareas, which had first been performed in 1963. (Patrikareas had also been involved in Helena of Sydney). A number of changes were made from the original play, including adding and removing certain characters, and opening it up instead of setting it all in the one location.

Cowan says the funds were raised relatively easily because there was a distribution circuit of Greek cinemas at the time. They often showed films in black and white and Cowan was going to make the film in black and white but the Australian Film Development Corporation offered twice the money if it was in colour and English.

Cowan originally wanted Irene Papas to play the lead but she was unavailable, so imported Yelena Zigon from Yugoslavia. Takis Emmanuel was brought over from Greece but the rest of the actors were locals, several from the Hellenic Theatre Company.

The movie was shot on 35mm with the budget mostly coming from the Australian Film Development Corporation. Cowan used a small crew of 14 technicians including several recruits from the Australian Film, Television and Radio School such as Gillian Armstrong and Graham Shirley. Shooting began early in March 1974 and took three weeks on location in Sydney. In April, a small unit flew to Greece to film some scenes of Antigone's home life.

Kate Fitzpatrick had injured her leg before making the film, meaning she was in great pain during the shoot.

== Release ==
The film was premiered at an arts festival in Canberra in March 1975. Following this there were some reshoots, including changing the ending: originally Antigone married Telis but this was adjusted so that she ended alone. The movie subsequently achieved a limited commercial release.

The play was revived in 2001.
