= Otherwise Engaged (Wednesday Theatre) =

- Wednesday Theatre episode
- The Age 2 Jun 1965
- Episode no.: Season 1 Episode 21
- Directed by: Oscar Whitbread
- Teleplay by: John Cameron
- Original air date: 2 June 1965
- Running time: 60 minutes

Episode chronology
← Previous "Replaced"	Next → "Dangerous Corner"

"Otherwise Engaged" is a 1965 Australian television film which aired on ABC. Broadcast in a 60-minute time-slot, it was written by John Cameron and produced in Melbourne. "Otherwise Engaged" aired on 2 June 1965 in Sydney, and Melbourne, and on 23 June 1965 in Brisbane.

It was part of Wednesday Theatre. The story was similar to A Private Island.

== Plot ==
As a result of pressures of running a large business, Henry Williamson finds he has been neglecting his duties to his family, providing unlimited funds instead of a husband and father's guiding hand. His son is lazy and fails his uni exams, his daughter Pamela is spoilt and is about to be married to a troublesome man called Bevin, and his wife Dorothy spends time making metal sculptures.

In an attempt to have a better family relationship, he takes them - and an employee, Tom - up in a plane to look at a country property he is thinking of buying and winds up on a Pacific island. Williamson insists his family stay there.

== Cast ==
- Michael Duffield as Henry Williamson
- Mary Ward as Dorothy
- Anne Charleston as his daughter Pamela
- Dennis Miller as Tom
- Jeffrey Hodgson as Buck
- Lloyd Cunnington as the pilot

== Production ==
The play was written exclusively for television. It was the third TV play by John Cameron, who had also written Outpost and The Teeth of Wind. It was described as "a play without a message" and was shot in Melbourne.

Cameron said in writing the play "I set out purely to entertain a television audience. This is a play written for television - it's not an adaptation of a stage play so the plot develops visually. It's one of those plays where you sit back and, I hope, enjoy it."

== Reception ==
The TV critic from the Sydney Morning Herald said "the play might have seemed more attractive in its corrective escapism if some of its palm-fringed, moon-visited settings had not been stirred so obviously by a studio breeze; and Oscar Whitbrcad's direction would have released more of the author's latent humour if his cast had been able to supply more than conventionally stiff realisations of conventional characters."

== See also ==
- List of live television plays broadcast on Australian Broadcasting Corporation (1950s)
