= Biographies of Oscar Wilde =

Books about Oscar Wilde's life and death

Oscar Wilde's life and death have generated numerous biographies.

== Memoirs ==
Lord Alfred Douglas wrote two books about his relationship with Wilde: Oscar Wilde and Myself (1914), largely ghost-written by T.W.H. Crosland, vindictively reacted to Douglas's discovery that De Profundis was addressed to him and defensively tried to distance him from Wilde's scandalous reputation. Both authors later regretted their work. Later, in Oscar Wilde: A Summing Up (1940) and his Autobiography he was more sympathetic to Wilde. An account of the argument between Frank Harris, Lord Alfred Douglas and Oscar Wilde as to the advisability of Wilde's prosecuting Queensberry can be found in the preface to George Bernard Shaw's play The Dark Lady of the Sonnets. Frank Harris made his own contribution in a full-length memoir, Oscar Wilde: His Life and Confessions (1916), which is considered very readable but not entirely reliable. In 1954 Vyvyan Holland published his memoir Son of Oscar Wilde, the story of his education after his father's disgrace and imprisonment. It was revised and updated by Merlin Holland in 1989. André Gide, on whom Wilde had such a strange effect, wrote, In Memoriam, Oscar Wilde; Wilde also features in his journals. Thomas Louis, who had earlier translated books on Wilde into French, produced his own L'esprit d'Oscar Wilde in 1920.

== Letters and documents ==
In 1962, Wilde's letters were first published, edited by Rupert Hart-Davis. Merlin Holland revised it and included new discoveries in The Complete Letters of Oscar Wilde (Merlin Holland & Rupert Hart-Davis. (2000). Henry Holt and Company LLC, New York. ISBN 0-8050-5915-6). In 1997 Merlin Holland published The Wilde Album. This small volume of pictures, images, and other Wilde memorabilia, drew on previously unpublished archives. It includes all 27 portraits taken by Napoleon Sarony in New York in 1882. In 2003 Merlin Holland edited the uncensored transcripts of Wilde's trials for publication. The book contained a 50-page introduction by Merlin Holland, and a foreword by John Mortimer QC. It was published as Irish Peacock and Scarlett Marquess: The Real Trial of Oscar Wilde in the UK, and as simply The Real Trial of Oscar Wilde in some other countries.

== Biographies ==
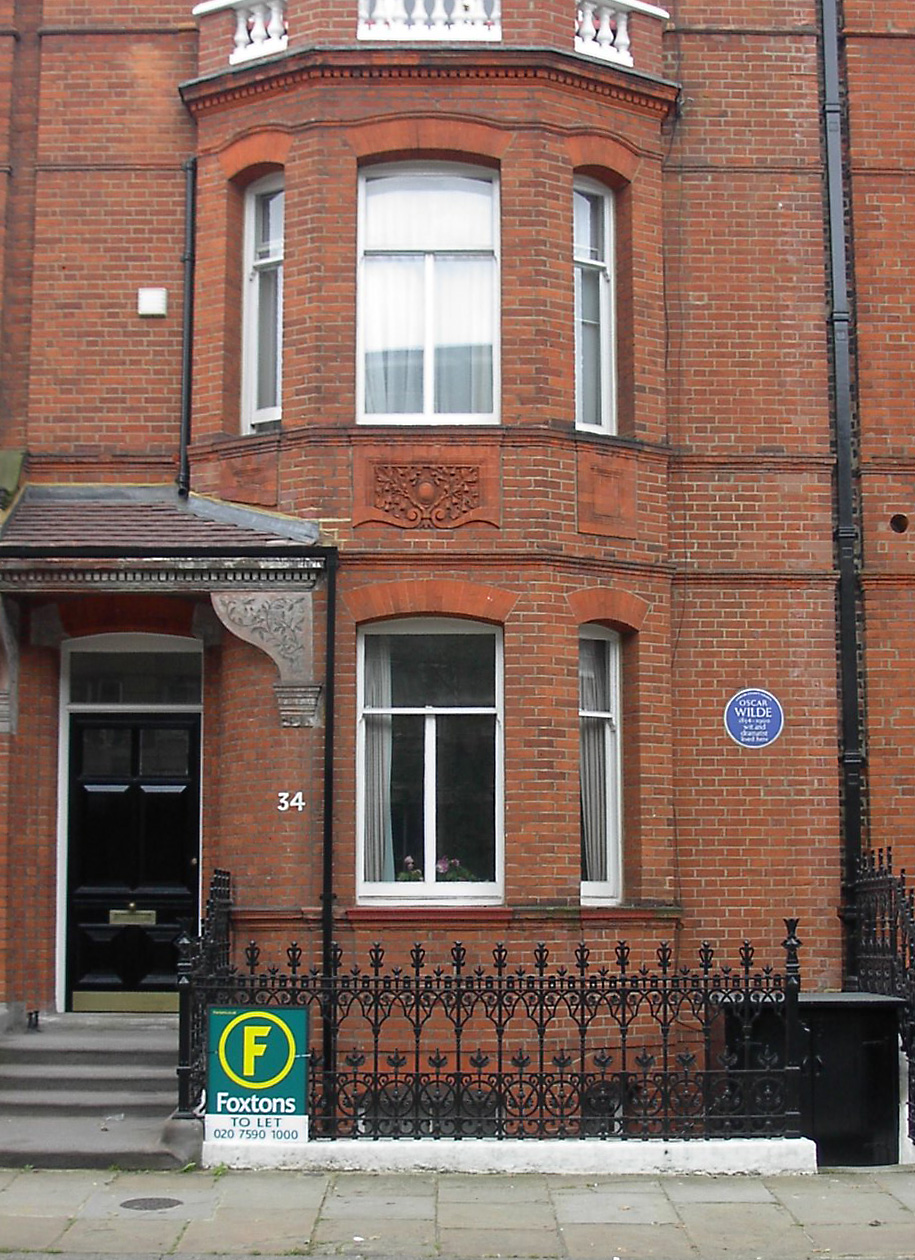
Oscar Wilde's house in Tite Street, Chelsea

- In 1946 Hesketh Pearson published The Life of Oscar Wilde (Methuen), containing materials derived from conversations with Bernard Shaw, George Alexander, Herbert Beerbohm Tree and many others who had known or worked with Wilde.
- In 1987 the literary biographer Richard Ellmann published his detailed work Oscar Wilde, for which he posthumously won a National (USA) Book Critics Circle Award in 1988 and a Pulitzer Prize in 1989. It is considered by some to be the definitive work on the subject. Ray Monk, a philosopher and biographer, described Ellmann's Oscar Wilde as a "rich, fascinating biography that succeeds in understanding another person". However, it has gained the reputation among Wilde scholars of being very fallible on points of fact. Paul Chipchase wrote that "It would be dangerous to rely on any single statement of Professor Ellmann without examining the sources for it", and Horst Schroeder that "his most elementary facts, attributions and quotations...were more often than not wrong". The book was the basis for the 1997 film Wilde, directed by Brian Gilbert.
- In 1994 Melissa Knox published her "psycho-biography" Oscar Wilde: A Long and Lovely Suicide. This book explores the ways in which Wilde's literary styles and the events of his life developed in response to his desires, conflicts and suffering. It offers new information as well as new insights into Wilde as an artist.
- 1999 saw the publication of Oscar Wilde on Stage and Screen by Robert Tanitch. This book is a comprehensive record of Wilde's life and work as presented on stage and screen from 1880 until 1999. It includes cast lists and snippets of reviews.
- In 2000 Barbara Belford, a professor at Columbia University, published Oscar Wilde: A Certain Genius.
- 2000 also saw the publication of The Unmasking of Oscar Wilde by Joseph Pearce. It explores the religious sensibility in his art, his interior suffering and dissatisfaction, his lifelong fascination with Catholicism despite his Protestant upbringing, and his reception into the Catholic Church on his deathbed.
- In 2003 Century/Random house published The Secret Life of Oscar Wilde by Neil McKenna, billed as the "first complete account of Wilde's sexual and emotional life". It is often speculative, and it has been widely criticised for its lack of scholarly rigour and its pure conjectures.
- In 2008 Chatto & Windus published Thomas Wright's Oscar's Books, a biography of Wilde the reader, which explores all aspects of his reading from his childhood in Dublin to his death in Paris. Wright tracked down many books that formerly belonged in Wilde's Tite Street Library, which was dispersed at the time of his trials; these contain Wilde's marginal notes, which no scholar had previously examined. The book was published as a Vintage paperback in September 2009. It was published in the USA, also in 2009, as Built of Books: How Reading Defined the Life of Oscar Wilde.
- In 2014 David M. Friedman published Wilde in America, the central core of which discusses Oscar's tour of the United States, but also provides an account of his life, especially his early education and rise to fame.
- In 2018 Head of Zeus Ltd in London published Matthew Sturgis's Oscar: A Life.

== Literary studies of Oscar Wilde ==
In 1912 Arthur Ransome published Oscar Wilde, a critical study, a literary study of Wilde. This briefly mentioned Wilde's life, but resulted in Ransome (and The Times Book Club) being sued for libel by Lord Alfred Douglas; a trial in April 1913 which in a way was a re-run of the trial(s) of Oscar Wilde. The trial resulted from Douglas's rivalry with Robbie Ross for Wilde (and his need for money). Douglas lost; De Profundis, which was read in part at the trial, disproved his claims.

== Novels and fiction about Wilde's life ==
- In 1955 Sewell Stokes wrote a novel, Beyond His Means, based on the life of Oscar Wilde.
- In 1983 Peter Ackroyd published The Last Testament of Oscar Wilde, a novel in the form of a pretended memoir.
- In 1990 Russell A.Brown published Sherlock Holmes and the Mysterious Friend of Oscar Wilde in which the writer consults the great detective.
- In 1991, cartoonist Dave Sim published Melmoth, a partially fictionalised account of Oscar Wilde's last days, as a part of his graphic epic Cerebus.
- In 1987, Robert Reilly wrote and published The God of Mirrors, a novel based on the facts of Wilde's "dazzling life and tragic fate."

== Biographical films, television series and stage plays ==
- The play Oscar Wilde (1936), written by Leslie and Sewell Stokes, based on the life of Wilde, included Frank Harris as a character. Starring Robert Morley, the play opened at the Gate Theatre in London in 1936, and two years later was staged in New York where its success launched the career of Morley as a stage actor.
- Two films of his life were released in 1960. The first to be released was Oscar Wilde starring Robert Morley and based on the Stokes brothers' play mentioned above. Then came The Trials of Oscar Wilde starring Peter Finch. At the time homosexuality was still a criminal offence in the UK and both films were rather cagey in touching on the subject without being explicit.
- In 1960, the Irish actor Micheál MacLíammóir began performing a one-man show called The Importance of Being Oscar. The show was heavily influenced by Brechtian theory and contained many poems and samples of Wilde's writing. The play was a success and MacLiammoir toured it with success everywhere he went. It was published in 1963.
- In 1972, director Adrian Hall's and composer Richard Cumming's play Feasting with Panthers, based on Wilde's writings and set in Reading Gaol, premiered at the Trinity Repertory Company in Providence, Rhode Island.
- In the summer of 1977 Vincent Price began performing the one-man play Diversions and Delights. Written by John Gay and directed by Joseph Hardy, the premise of the play is that an ageing Oscar Wilde, to earn some much-needed money, gave a lecture on his life in a Parisian theatre on 28 November 1899 (just a year before his death). The play was a success everywhere it was performed, except for its New York City run. It was revived in 1990 in London with Donald Sinden in the role.
- In 1977, the La Mama Theatre in Melbourne, Australia staged Barry Dickins' one-act play The Great Oscar Wilde Trial. Starring Ross Dixon in the title role, the play was a dramatization of the three trials that ruined Wilde's career.
- In 1978 London Weekend Television produced a television series about the life of Lillie Langtry entitled Lillie. In it Peter Egan played Oscar. The bulk of his scenes portrayed their close friendship up to and including their tours of America in 1882. Thereafter, he was in a few more scenes leading up to his trials in 1895.
- Michael Gambon portrayed Wilde on British television in 1985 in the three-part BBC series Oscar concentrating on the trial and prison term.
- 1988 saw Nickolas Grace playing Wilde in Ken Russell's film Salome's Last Dance.
- In 1989 Terry Eagleton premiered his play St. Oscar. Eagleton agrees that only one line in the entire play is taken directly from Wilde, while the rest of the dialogue is his own fancy. The play is also influenced by Brechtian theory.
- Tom Holland's 1988 play (radio version 1990, professional performance 1991) The Importance of Being Frank relates Wilde's trial, imprisonment and exile, using quotation and pastiche of The Importance of Being Earnest.
- In 1994 Jim Bartley published Stephen and Mr. Wilde, a novel about Wilde and his fictional black manservant Stephen set during Wilde's American tour.
- Moises Kaufman's 1997 play Gross Indecency: The Three Trials of Oscar Wilde uses real quotes and transcripts of Wilde's three trials.
- Wilde appears as a supporting character in Tom Stoppard's 1997 play The Invention of Love and is referenced extensively in Stoppard's 1974 play Travesties.
- Avoiding the restrictions on the two films from 1960, British actor Stephen Fry portrayed Wilde (whose fan he had been since the age of 13) in the 1997 film Wilde to critical acclaim – a role that he has said he was "born to play". Fry, an acknowledged Wilde scholar, also appeared as Wilde in the short-lived American television series Ned Blessing (1993).
- David Hare's 1998 play The Judas Kiss depicts Wilde's scandal and disgrace at the hands of his young lover Bosie.
- In 1999, Romulus Linney published Oscar Over Here which recounts Wilde's lectures in America during the 1880s, specifically in Leadville, CO, as well as his time in prison and a death fantasy which included a conversation with a Jesus Christ figure. The first performance of this work was in New York in 1995.
- The main character in the Lynn Ahrens and Stephen Flaherty musical A Man of No Importance identifies himself with Oscar Wilde, and Wilde appears to him several times.
- In 2000, Australian actor Sam Sejavka starred in the one-man show Believe Me, Oscar Wilde at the La Mama Theatre in Melbourne, Australia. The script was written by playwright Barry Dickins, who had also previously penned The Great Oscar Wilde Trial for La Mama back in 1977.
- Actor/playwright Jade Esteban Estrada portrayed Wilde in the solo musical comedy ICONS: The Lesbian and Gay History of the World, Vol. 1 in 2002.
- Oscar: in October 2004, a stage musical by Mike Read about Wilde closed after just one night at the Shaw Theatre in Euston after a severe critical mauling.
- De Profundis in 2004, a theatrical adaptation of Wilde's letter of the same name, was performed by Don Anderson at the Segal Centre for the Arts in Montreal, Quebec. Receiving psitiver reviews and playing to sold out audiences, the role won Anderson the MECCA, Montreal English Critic's Circle Award, for best actor of 2004.
- An opera by Theodore Morrison and John Cox based on Wilde's life is to be premiered by the Santa Fe Opera in their 2013 summer festival, starring countertenor David Daniels in the title role. It received a co-commission with Opera Company of Philadelphia through its American Repertoire Program, and will show there in 2015.
- The film The Happy Prince starring Rupert Everett (who also wrote and directed) as Oscar Wilde, premiered in June 2018 in London. The film concerns itself with the three and a half years of Wilde's life after his release from jail in May 1897. Peter Bradshaw, writing for The Guardian, stated that "this film is a deeply felt, tremendously acted tribute to courage."
