= Norman Kaye =

Australian actor (1927–2007)

- Born: Norman James Kaye; 17 January 1927; Melbourne, Australia
- Died: 28 May 2007 (aged 80); Sydney, Australia
- Education: Geelong Grammar School; Notre-Dame de Paris
- Occupations: Actor, musician
- Years active: 1961–2004
- Known for: Lonely Hearts (1982); Man of Flowers (1983)
- Partner: Elke Neidhardt

Norman James Kaye (17 January 1927 – 28 May 2007) was an Australian actor and musician. He was best known for his roles in the films of director Paul Cox.

== Early life and education ==
Kaye was born into a tough childhood in Depression Era Melbourne, as one of four children. His father was an injured, poor Boer War veteran, his mother suffered from mental illness, and both parents were distant. Kaye was taken in as a child by the Norton family, who provided him with a safe haven from the hardships at home.

Kaye won a scholarship to study at Geelong Grammar School. His parents both died early, his mother in a psychiatric hospital.

== Career ==
=== Music ===
Kaye's musical abilities were noticed by A. E. Floyd, the organist of St Paul's Cathedral, Melbourne, who gave him free tuition in recognition of his potential as an organist.

Kaye travelled to England and then France to study the organ with Pierre Cochereau at Notre-Dame de Paris and he won a Premier Prix for conducting at the Nice Conservatoire. He returned to Australia due to feeling lonely and homesick. Back in Melbourne, he continued his pursuit of music, including as the acting organist of St Paul's Cathedral.

=== Teaching ===
Kaye was the choirmaster and the music teacher at Caulfield Grammar School, a private school in Melbourne, from 1958 to 1977, during which time he "[laid] the foundation for [the school's] … high reputation on the world of music [and it was his] enthusiasm and constructive knowledge [that] made choral singing and the playing of orchestral instruments activities of a central rather than peripheral importance to the school." It was the security of a teacher's salary that allowed Kaye to explore the acting world.

=== Acting ===
With a passion for acting, Kaye began his career playing minor unpaid roles in small theatres, when television was still in its infancy. He did not however start acting full time until he was in his forties.

In 1967, Kaye met director Paul Cox, who at the time was a photographer, taking production stills at St Martin's Theatre. He ended up appearing in 16 of Cox's films, beginning with small roles in Illuminations (1975) and Kostas (1979), before sharing the lead with Wendy Hughes in Cox's 1982 film Lonely Hearts which saw him nominated for an AFI Award. He also played the lead in Man of Flowers (1983), this time winning an AFI Award. He appeared in minor roles in many subsequent Cox films, including Innocence (2000).

Other early films in which Kaye appeared included Mad Dog Morgan (1976) and Inside Looking Out (1977), His film career continued in the 1980s with roles in Buddies (1983) and Unfinished Business (1986). In 1987, he appeared in mystery horror Frenchman’s Farm with John Meillon and comedy Hungry Heart alongside Nick Carrafa before acting in drama film Boundaries of the Heart opposite Wendy Hughes the following year. He also appeared in the 1988 documentary Vincent – The Life and Death of Vincent Van Gogh with Gabi Trsek.

Kaye appeared in film roles well into the 1990s, with Turtle Beach (1992), western Broken Highway (1993) and Exile (1994) both with Aden Young and Bad Boy Bubby (1993) and Lust and Revenge (1996), both alongside Nicholas Hope. In 1997, he appeared in Oscar and Lucinda with Cate Blanchett and Baz Luhrmann’s musical epic Moulin Rouge! (2001), opposite Nicole Kidman and Ewan McGregor.

Kaye's television credits included medical drama The Flying Doctors, cult prison drama Prisoner, police procedural series Homicide, crime drama Wildside and miniseries Power Without Glory, based on the historical novel by Frank Hardy.

He also wrote the scores for many films, including Lonely Hearts and the Burton Pugach documentary Crazy Love (2007).

Kaye is the subject of Cox's biographical film The Remarkable Mr Kaye (2005), a tribute to their long standing friendship and working relationship.

== Personal life and death ==
Kaye was diagnosed with Alzheimer's disease prior to 1997. His inability to memorise scripts for the film Innocence led to the end of his collaboration with Paul Cox, as well as the end of his career in 2004. Kaye was in the advanced stage of the disease at the time of his death in Sydney on 28 May 2007. He had enjoyed a 35-year relationship with the opera director Elke Neidhardt, and she was by his side at his death.

== Legacy ==
In 2007 a retrospective CD, The Remarkable Norman Kaye, was issued by Move Records.

== Filmography ==
=== Film ===
Year	Title	Role	Notes
1972	The Journey		
1976	Illuminations	Gabi's Father	
1976	Mad Dog Morgan	Swagman	
1978	Inside Looking Out	Alex	
1979	Kostas	Passenger	
1981	The Killing of Angel Street	Mander	
1982	A Dangerous Summer	Percy Farley	
1982	Lonely Hearts	Peter Thompson	
1983	Buddies	George	
1983	Careful, He Might Hear You	Uncredited	
1983	Man of Flowers	Charles Bremer	
1984	Where the Green Ants Dream	Baldwin Ferguson	
1984	Relatives	Uncle Edward	
1985	Unfinished Business	George	
1986	Cactus	Tom	
1987	Warm Nights on a Slow Moving Train	Salesman	
1987	Frenchman's Farm	Reverend Aldershot	
1987	Hungry Heart	Mr. O'Ryan	
1988	Boundaries of the Heart	Billy Marsden	
1989	Island	Henry	
1990	Golden Braid	Psychiatrist	
1991	A Woman's Tale	Billy	
1992	Turtle Beach	Hobday	
1992	The Nun and the Bandit	George Shanley	Also known as The Killing Beach
1993	The Nostradamus Kid	Wedding Pastor	
1993	Broken Highway	Elias Kidd	
1993	Bad Boy Bubby	The Scientist	
1993	The Custodian	Judge	
1993	Touch Me	Charles	Short film
1994	Exile	Ghost Priest	
1995	Surrender	Norman	Short film
1996	Lust and Revenge	Baba Charles	
1997	Heaven's Burning	Store Owner	
1997	Paws	Alex	
1997	Oscar and Lucinda	Bishop Dancer	
2000	Innocence	Gerald	
2001	Moulin Rouge!	Satine's Doctor	
2004	Human Touch	Charles	Final film role

=== Television ===
Year	Title	Role	Notes
1961	The First Joanna	Stephen Deveron	TV play
1961	The Secret of Susanna	Sante	TV play
1962	Boy Round the Corner	Shannon	TV play
1962	Fury in Petticoats	Charles Darwin	TV play
1962	You Can't Win 'Em All	Manuel Selasco	TV play
1964	The Angry General	Major Derek Barrington-Hunt	TV play
1964	Martha		TV play
1964	The Road	Sir Timothy Hassall	TV play
1964	Wind from the Icy Country	Ehrbar	TV play
1964	Everyman	Discretion	TV play
1964	Six Characters in Search of an Author	The Father	TV play
1966	Boy with Banner	Mr Browne	TV play
1968–1969	Hunter	Captain Jansen / Max Holland / Inspector	3 episodes
1969	Riptide	Eric Garrow	1 episode
1969	The Party	Erasmus	TV play
1973	Ryan	Florist	1 episode
1969–1974	Division 4	Edward James / Hotel clerk / Rev Lewis / Bill Reed / Dr Mason / Dr Young / Freddie Baxter / Bernie Townsend / Alan Standish / Scott	11 episodes
1975	Shannon's Mob	Henry Vaughan	1 episode
1964–1975	Homicide	Prosecutor / Dr Ian Scott / Lou Hines / Haines / Frank Vaughan / Doug Thompson / Dr Edmunds / Roger Warwick / Sutton / Max Hudson / Michael Franklin / Graham Smith / Maddox / Clyde Starling / Nigel Harcourt / Griffiths / Robert Craig / David Metcalfe	18 episodes
1971–1976	Matlock Police	Sect elder #1 / Gaylord / Ivan Beckett	3 episodes
1976	The Bluestone Boys		
1976	Power Without Glory	Ned Horan / Prosecuting Sergeant	Miniseries, 2 episodes
1979	Ride on Stranger	Inspector	Miniseries, 2 episodes
1979	Prisoner	Ron Watkins	2 episodes
1980	The Last Outlaw	Supt. Sadleir	Miniseries, 4 episodes
1982	Deadline	ASIO agent	TV movie
1983	Carson's Law	Roger Cruickshank	1 episode
1978–1983	Cop Shop	Sir Joseph Moore / Keith Anderson / Mr Montford	4 episodes
1984	The Cowra Breakout	Mr Davidson	Miniseries
1984	Special Squad	Lenny / Skittles	2 episodes
1986	Handle with Care	Surgeon	TV movie
1986	Dancing Daze	Stephen Isaacs	6 episodes
1986	Winners	Trapp	Anthology series, 1 episode
1986	Tusitala	Reverend Clark	Miniseries, 3 episodes
1986	Call Me Mister	Sir James Bartholemew	1 episode
1986	I Own the Racecourse	Drunken Old Man	TV movie
1987	Frontier	Lancelot Threlkeld	Miniseries, 3 episodes
1987	Flight into Hell		Miniseries
1987	The Shiralee	Desmond	Miniseries, 2 episodes
1988	Rafferty's Rules	Harold Messenger	1 episode
1988	The Riddle of the Stinson	Binstead	TV movie
1988	The True Believers	Archbishop Daniel Mannix	Miniseries, 6 episodes
1989	Bangkok Hilton	George McNair (uncredited)	Miniseries, 1 episode
1987–1990	The Flying Doctors	William Randall	5 episodes
1992	G.P.	Luke Chisholm	2 episodes
1993	A Country Practice	Tony Oldin	2 episodes
1994	Under the Skin		Anthology series, 2 episodes
1994	Law of the Land	Charlie Carmody	1 episode
1995	Bordertown	Pieter Leeuwen	Miniseries, 4 episodes
1996	Water Rats	Felix Friedman	2 episodes
1997	Good Guys, Bad Guys	Roly Finster	1 episode
1997	Roar	Galen	1 episode
1998	Wildside	Ralph Morton	Season 1, episode 1
1998	Murder Call	Vic Popov	Season 3
1999	Without Warning	Max	TV movie

== Theatre ==
=== As actor ===
Year	Title	Role	Notes	Ref.
1958	Dinner with the Family		Melbourne Little Theatre	
1958	The Potting Shed		Melbourne Little Theatre	
1960	Sabrina Fair		Melbourne Little Theatre	
1961	The Prodigal Son	Azael	ABC TV Studios, Melbourne	
1961	The Elder Statesman		Melbourne Little Theatre	
1961	The Slaughter of St Teresa's Day		Melbourne Little Theatre	
1962	The Public Prosecutor		Melbourne Little Theatre	
1963	Silent Night, Lonely Night		St Martins Theatre, Melbourne	
1963	A Touch of the Poet		St Martins Theatre, Melbourne	
1964	The Tower		St Martins Theatre, Melbourne	
1965	Poor Bitos	Danton	St Martins Theatre, Melbourne	
1965	Dylan		St Martins Theatre, Melbourne	
1966	The Cavern		St Martins Theatre, Melbourne	
1968	The Little Foxes	Horace Giddens	St Martins Theatre, Melbourne	
1968	The Judge	The Judge	St Martins Theatre, Melbourne	
1969	Eden House	Mark Russell	St Martins Theatre, Melbourne	
1969	Marching Song		St Martins Theatre, Melbourne	
1969	The Rope Dancers	James Hyland	St Martins Theatre, Melbourne	
1970	The Chalk Garden	Maitland	St Martins Theatre, Melbourne	
1970	On Approval	Richard Halton	St Martins Theatre, Melbourne	
1971	The Happy Apple		St Martins Theatre, Melbourne	
1971	Uncle Vanya	Mihail Lvovitch Astrov, a country Doctor	St Martins Theatre, Melbourne	
1972	Caesar and Cleopatra	Caesar	St Martins Theatre, Melbourne	
1974	Three Men on a Horse		Sydney Opera House	
1974; 1975	Hotel Paradiso		UNSW Old Tote Theatre, Sydney, Playhouse, Canberra	
1976	Rookery Nook		UNSW Old Tote Theatre, Sydney	
1977	The Fall Guy	Jack	Russell St Theatre, Melbourne with MTC	
1978	Richard III	Edward IV	Melbourne Athenaeum with MTC	
1978	Henry IV	Westmoreland / Sherrif / Shallow	Nimrod Theatre, Sydney	
1978	Widowers' Houses	William de Burgh Kokane	UNSW Old Tote Theatre, Sydney	
1979	The Lady of the Camellias	Comte de Varville	Sydney Opera House with STC	
1979	Rain	Dr MacPhail	Ensemble Theatre, Sydney	
1980	Mourning Becomes Electra	Brant / Ezra	SGIO Theatre, Brisbane with QTC	
1980	The Precious Woman	Mr Simpson / Peasant / Refugee / Pianist	Sydney Opera House with QTC	
1981	Cole's Funny Picture Person		Universal Theatre, Melbourne	
1981	Amadeus	Baron Gottfried van Swieten	Melbourne Athenaeum with MTC	
1982	As You Like It	Adam	Melbourne Athenaeum with MTC	
1982	The Changeling		Universal Theatre, Melbourne with MTC	
1982	A Perfect Retreat		Melbourne Athenaeum with MTC	
1983	Slice		Melbourne Athenaeum with MTC	
1986	An Imaginary Life		Belvoir St Theatre, Sydney	
1986	The Seagull		Sydney Opera House with STC	
1986	Dead to the World		Russell St Theatre, Melbourne with MTC	
1988	Big and Little	The Old Man / Wilhelm	Sydney Opera House with STC	
1989	The Road to Mecca	Marius Byleveld	Russell St Theatre, Melbourne with MTC	
1990	Hopping to Byzantium		Ensemble Theatre, Sydney	
1990	Swimming in Light	Dancer	Fairfax Studio, Melbourne, Seymour Centre, Sydney with Kim Carpenter's Theatre of Image	
1991	The Revenger's Tragedy		Sydney Opera House with STC	
1991	Racing Demon		Wharf Theatre, Sydney with STC	
1993	Shadowlands	Harry Harrington	Playhouse, Melbourne with MTC	
1993	The Temple	Sir James Wilson / Barry St John	Wharf Theatre, Sydney with STC	
1996	Mr Halpern and Mr Johnson		Ensemble Theatre, Sydney	
1998	Blinded by the Sun		Sydney Opera House with Ensemble Theatre	

=== As crew ===
Year	Title	Role	Notes
1961	The Splendid Outcasts	Musical Advisor	Melbourne Little Theatre
1965	Oedipus Rex	Composer / Sound Designer	Emerald Hill Theatre, Melbourne
1966	The Magic Dream	Composer	St Martins Theatre, Melbourne
1969	Love for Love	Musical Advisor	St Martins Theatre, Melbourne
1993	Shadowlands	Organist	Playhouse, Melbourne with MTC

== Awards and nominations ==
Year	Work	Award	Category	Result
1982	Lonely Hearts	AFI Award	Best Actor in a Lead Role	Nominated
1983	Man of Flowers	AFI Award	Best Actor in a Lead Role	Won

== See also ==
- List of Caulfield Grammar School people
