= Hungry Heart (film) =

Australian film

- Directed by: Luigi Acquisto
- Written by: Luigi Acquisto
- Based on: a script by Rosa Colosimo; Josie Arnold; Angela Salamanca
- Produced by: Rosa Colosimo
- Starring: Nick Carrafa; Kimberley Davenport
- Cinematography: Jaems Grant
- Edited by: Courtney Page
- Production companies: Chancom Ltd; Lions Den Productions
- Distributed by: Video Entertainment (video)
- Release date: 1987
- Running time: 96 minutes
- Country: Australia
- Language: English
- Budget: A$500,000 or $785,000

Hungry Heart is a 1987 Australian film about a love affair that goes wrong.

== Plot ==
Doctor Sal Bono falls in love with wool classer Kate Maloney.

== Cast ==
- Nick Carrafa as Salvatore Bono
- Kimberley Davenport as Kate
- Lisa Schouw as Jane
- Osvaldo Malone as Vito
- Mark Rogers as Charlie
- Norman Kaye as Mr O'Ryan
- Dasha Blahova as Mrs. Bono
- Carmelina di Guglielmo as Connie Bono
- John Flaus as Mr Maloney

== Production ==
The film was shot in August 1987 at the house of producer-writer Rosa Colosimo. It was director Luigi Acquisto's feature debut. The soundtrack features Separate Tables whose lead singer, Schouw, costars in the film.

== Reception ==
Phillipa Hawker in The Age wrote "'Hungry Heart' is '80s disaffection - not cool but cold." The Sydney Morning Herald's Doug Anderson in his capsual review stated "Nick Carrafa and Davenport offer energetic performances and the film, while not considered good enough for a commercial release, has enough to make it palatable." Susan Demody of Filmnews praises the "sense of an unusual openness and warmth between the characters and the generations".
