= Defending the Caveman =

Comedy play

- Written by: Rob Becker
- Original language: English
- Genre: Comedy

Premiere
- Date premiered: June 1991
- Place premiered: San Francisco, USA
- Official website

Defending the Caveman is a comedy play written by American actor and comedian Rob Becker about the misunderstandings between men and women. Defending the Caveman has been seen in theaters around the world by more than eight million people in forty-five countries. It has been performed in over thirty languages. Theater Mogul is the rights holder of the play.

== Plot ==
A blend of stand-up comedy, lecture, and therapy session, it attempts to resolve the war between the sexes. The play manages to stand up for the male viewpoint, while still being sympathetic to the female side of issues as well. Becker describes the play as a vehicle for showing that "men have emotions, but they express them differently."

== Productions ==
Before the Broadway production "Caveman" was a stand-up comedy routine that Becker performed around America. Becker took over three years to write the comedy and performed the play until early 2006. In 1996, it became the longest running solo (one man) play in the history of Broadway. It still holds that record as of 2016. A production has run in Las Vegas since 2007.

Becker was replaced by Michael Chiklis for the final months of the original Broadway run.

The play has also been run in Cape Town, South Africa and Mumbai, India.
