= Palace Theatre, Mansfield =

Theatre and former cinema in Mansfield, England

Mansfield Palace Theatre
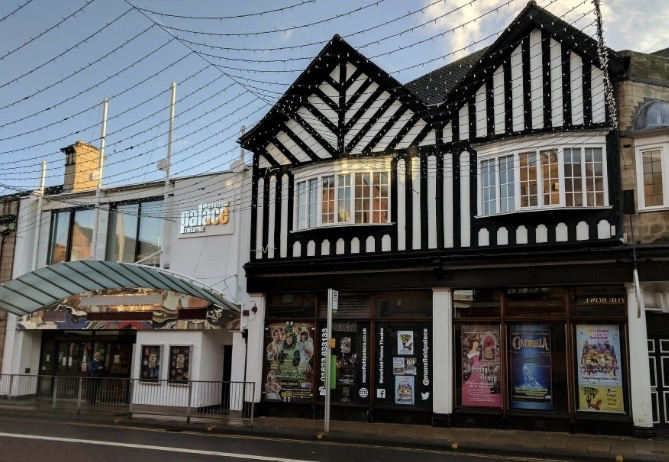
- A view of the theatre
- Interactive map of Mansfield Palace Theatre
- Former names: Civic Theatre
- Address: Leeming Street; Mansfield, Nottinghamshire; England
- Coordinates: 53.1462°N 1.1945°W
- Owner: Mansfield District Council
- Capacity: 534 (2 levels)
- Type: Proscenium

Construction
- Opened: 13 December 1910
- Years active: 100+ years

Website
- Mansfield Palace Theatre

The Palace Theatre in Mansfield, Nottinghamshire, England first opened on 13 December 1910 as a cinema. It was later converted to a live theatre, which has been its primary function ever since. The theatre was completely renovated and refurbished in the 1990s and now stages a varied programme of events including dance, drama and music. It is a popular receiving house for one night shows. The theatre is owned and operated by Mansfield District Council.

== History ==

The Palace Electric Theatre opened on Tuesday 13 December 1910. It was the first cinema in the town and only showed silent films at first. In 1949 the cinema was converted to a live theatre, featuring famous names such as Larry Grayson, Steve Lawrence and Hilda Baker.

Mansfield District Council bought the theatre for £11,500 in 1953 and have been responsible for it ever since. After commissioning renovation work, the council reopened the theatre as 'Mansfield Civic Hall' with the first performance in the 'new' theatre being "School for Spinsters" by Chesterfield Repertory Company.

In 1963, nearly all of the foyer and façade were rebuilt to give the theatre a new look. In 1968, a public competition offered a prize to rename the theatre. Many suggestions were made, but it was decided that the Civic Theatre was the most appropriate, although this later changed to the 'Palace Theatre', the building's original name.

== The Palace today ==
As part of a project to make the Palace Theatre a major touring venue for the North of England, the theatre closed for major redevelopments in 1997. During the seven-month period in which it was closed, many areas of the theatre were demolished, with all of the building being completely renovated. The project cost over £2.9 million.

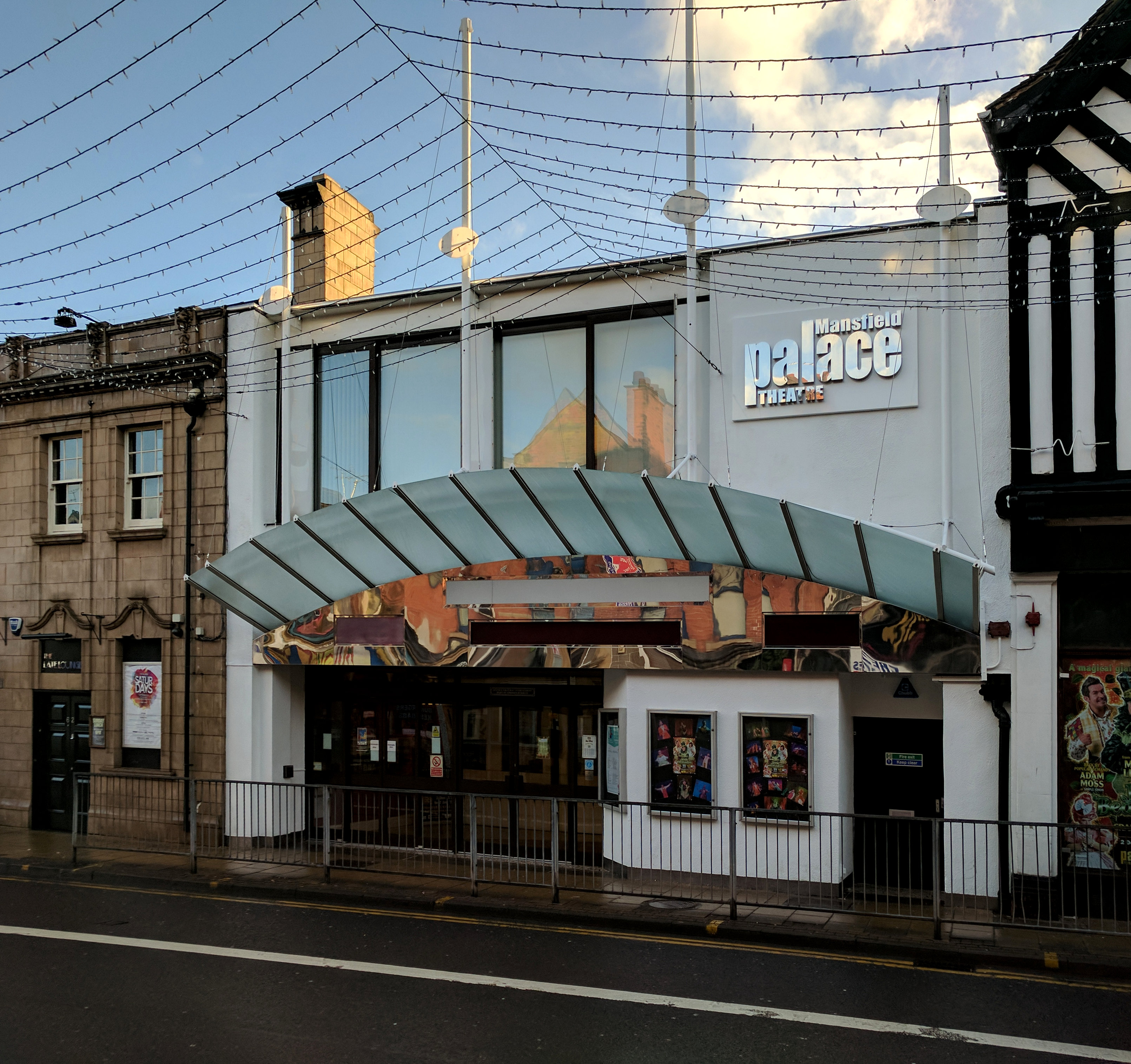
Palace Theatre

As a result of the works, the Palace Theatre has been designated as a regional mid-scale touring venue, meaning that it caters for an audience within a 40-minute drive-time. Along with physical improvements to the theatre, programming of the venue has also been revised to offer a broader range of events suited to its new status. To complement the amateur and professional variety shows performed at the theatre, it now stages a wider range of professional performances including classical music, opera and contemporary dance.

=== Redevelopment history ===
- The orchestra pit was extended and redesigned to accommodate more musicians and provide improved sound quality, with some acoustic adjustments made to the auditorium.
- The wings were extended to provide a greater back-stage space – this was essential to the development as it enables the theatre to receive larger scale sets and shows.
- A 60-foot (18 m) high fly tower was built above the stage – this allows traditional backdrops to be used more effectively.
- The proscenium arch was widened to enhance the greater stage space.
- New seats were installed, providing greater leg room and comfort and improved access for disabled patrons.
- The foyer and public spaces were fully refurbished and modernised.
- A lift and ramp were installed to enable easy access to all areas except the balcony.
- New spaces were created to facilitate the use of the theatre for corporate entertainment, training and workshops.
- A computerised box office system was installed.
- A new, contemporary façade was built.
