= Paul Cox (director) =

Dutch-Australian filmmaker (1940–2016)

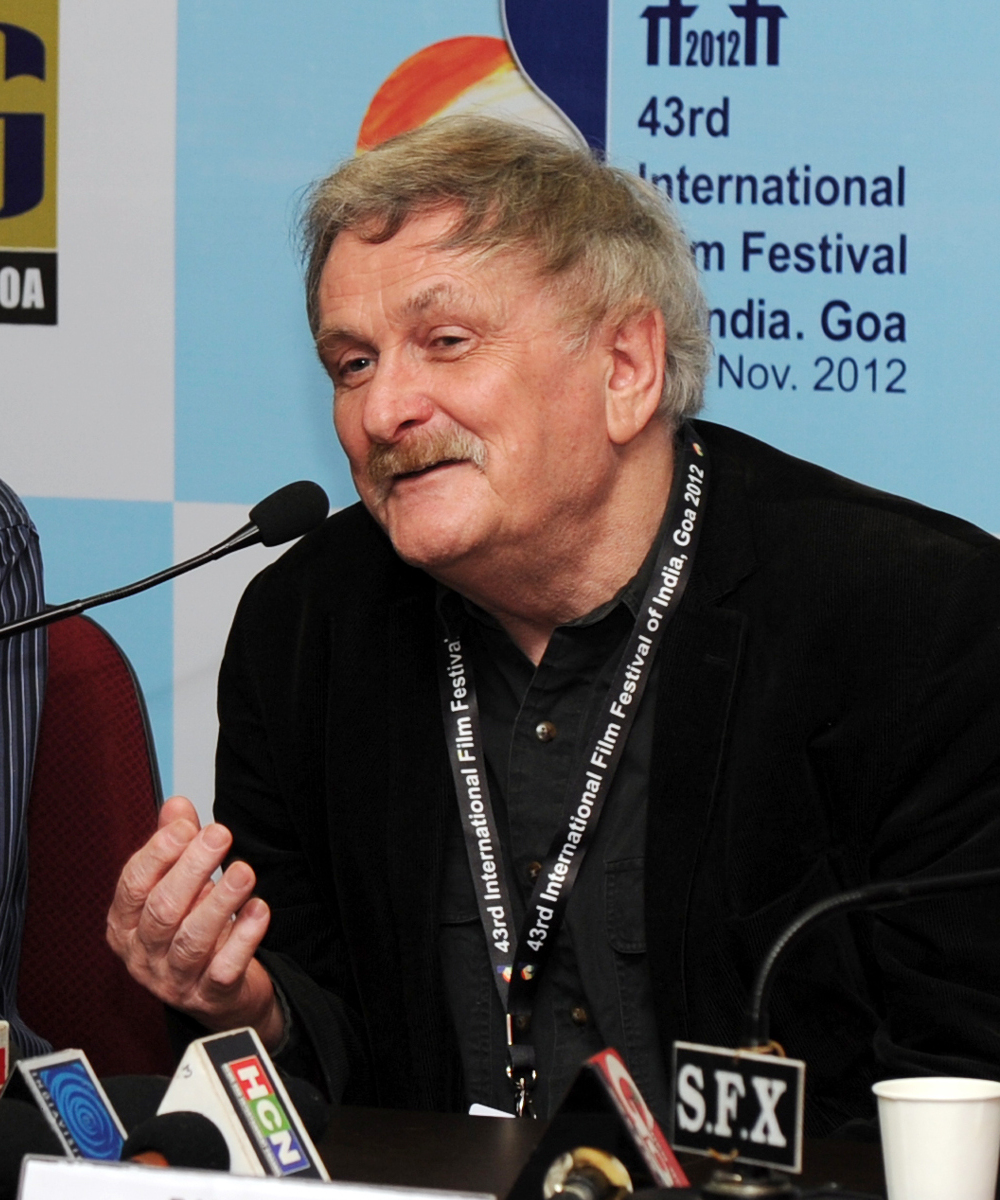
- Cox in 2012
- Born: Paulus Henrique Benedictus Cox; 16 April 1940; Venlo, Netherlands
- Died: 18 June 2016 (aged 76); Melbourne, Victoria, Australia
- Education: Nederlandse Fotovakschool 1958-61
- Occupations: Film director; photographer; writer
- Years active: 1964–2015
- Notable work: Man of Flowers 1986
- Style: neo-romantic
- Children: Ezra, Kyra, Marius
- Awards: Winner – Ilford Photography Award; 1971 'Age of Aquarius' – photographer; Best Film – Australian Film Institute National Film Awards; 1982 'Lonely Hearts' – director; Golden Spike – Valladolid International Film Festival; 1984 'Man of Flowers' – director; Best Director, Best Screenplay – AACTA Awards; 1984 'My First Wife' – director AFI Award; Golden Spur – Flanders International Film Festival; 1986 'My First Wife' – director; Best Director, Best Screenplay – Flanders International Film Festival; 1992 'A Woman's Tale' – director; Chauvel Award – Brisbane International Film Festival; 1993 'A Woman's Tale' – director; FIPRESCI Prize – Taormina International Film Festival; 1993 'Innocence' – director; Grand Prix des Amériques – Festival des Films du Monde; 2000 'Innocence' – director; Jury Prize – Festival des Films du Monde; 2003 'The Diaries of Vaslav Nijinsky' – director; Grand Prix des Amériques – Festival des Films du Monde; 2004 'Human Touch' – director

Signature
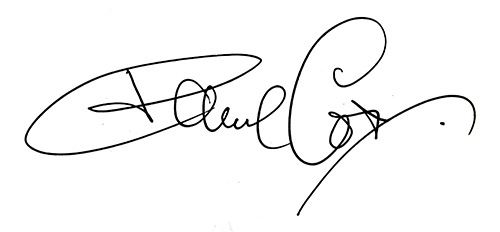

Paulus Henrique Benedictus Cox (16 April 1940 – 18 June 2016), known as Paul Cox, was a Dutch-Australian filmmaker and photographer.

After moving from Netherlands to Australia in the 1960s, he worked there commercially, produced books (1970–1980) of his interpretive photojournalism, and co-founded the Photographers' Gallery and Workshop. Having taught himself by making short productions, he was appointed by Lenton Parr to lecture in film in the photography department at the art school Prahran College (1968). There, his work further developed and he made his first feature Illuminations, from which his film company, an enduring crew and cast from his own circle, took its name.

Cox left art education at the end of 1979 to produce a major feature film almost annually, becoming recognised as "Australia's most prolific film auteur" who achieved several box-office successes and numerous awards despite uncompromisingly eschewing commercialism.

Cox wrote three autobiographies, the last, Tales from the Cancer Ward (2011), recounts his undergoing cancer treatment while continuing to make films. Force of Destiny he made in the year before he died.

== Background ==
Cox was born to Else (née Kuminack), a German, and father Wim Cox, on 16 April 1940, in Venlo, Limburg, the Netherlands, after his brother (also named Wim) and sister Elizabeth, and was the older sibling of sisters Jacoba, Angeline and Christa.

Cox's father, Wim Cox, was a documentary film producer and son of the publisher of the Catholic newspaper Nieuwe Venlosche Courant. Cox senior in 1933 launched the lavishly illustrated, but ultimately unsuccessful, film magazine Zuiderfilm, and in 1935 proposed to build a cinema at the newspaper's office. He was commissioned in 1938 by Van Meegeren, the chairman of the 'RK Bond voor Groote Families' (Catholic Association for Large Families) founded in 1917 by Mathijs Janssen, to make the film Levensgang ('The Journey of Life'.) Wim Cox senior had made shorts before, but this was his first major film. Using 16 mm film and a self-designed sound system, he recorded the daily life of a large Catholic family in Venlo.

Film critic Janus van Domburg (1895–1983) praised Levensgang as the Netherlands best 16mm film to date. The Tegelse Courant wrote: '...this film projects a beam of light on the path of life'. The non-Catholic Algemeen Handelsblad agreed: "[Cox] has managed to capture scenes of joy and sadness, moments of emotion and contemplation on film. All is edited into a fascinating and flowing whole, with strong cinematic rhythms that speak a clear language." Between its premiere on October 12, 1938, until 1940 the film was seen by 25,000. Paul Cox discovered only much later that his father had been a filmmaker who made documentaries in the Netherlands, Belgium and Germany before the Second World War, and is recorded as saying that though his father's film was 'dreadful propaganda' and terribly outdated,' he admired it as "real cinema. The whole concept of it was very meticulously researched, you can see that in the storyboarding of every shot. It's quite a remarkable piece of work. This is, in a way, a better propaganda film than anything Leni Riefenstahl ever did."

Cox's older brother, born 1938 and also named Wim, after having learned from assisting his father, made a career in film and photography. He studied at the Nederlansche Fotofakschool 1958-61, moved to Cologne to work in the Lambertin photo studio at the Hohenzollern Bridge and from 1971 was self-employed, taking over the Cologne photo workshop Schmölz & Ulrich. Wim Cox junior was Board member of the Cologne Photographic Guild, chairman of the journeyman's examination board and member of the German Society for Photography. The brothers in 1997 co-wrote the autobiographical book Ich Bin ('I Am').

== WWII flight ==
Just after his birth Cox and his family were forced to flee their border town home during the German invasion of Holland in April and May 1940, experiencing traumatic events during the rest of the war which Cox felt were formative. Postwar accusations that Wim Cox's grandfather in his publication Nieuwe Venlosche Courant had cooperated with the Germans brought repercussions on his family, including the seizure of all filmmaking equipment, cutting short Cox's father's career. That was the cause of much bitterness, though in 1957 Cox senior was able to make a feature film Reden tot leven ('Reason for Living'). He set up as a portrait photographer, recruiting daughter Elizabeth, and later, most of the rest of the family, to assist in the darkroom.

== Early photography ==
Cox was conscripted into the army at nineteen, was injured in training and subsequently, against his father's wishes, studied art in evening school. He used an old camera from his father's studio to take his earliest successful photographs on a trip to Paris with his mother, one of which appears on the cover of his autobiography Reflections.

== Emigration ==
Cox emigrated to Australia as a tertiary-level exchange student in 1963, by which time he had already established himself as a photographer. Although his destination was Sydney, he was put ashore in Melbourne. There he enrolled at the University of Melbourne "to study history and English literature for an Arts degree", taking part-time jobs as a camera retailer and events photographer, but after eighteen months had left when a love affair interrupted his studies. He traveled back to Holland on a French cargo ship via South Pacific, South America, and back home held two exhibitions of the resultant photographs.

== Photographer ==
Cox determined to return to Australia and in 1965 he emigrated. He first worked in the camera department in the Myer department store and saved enough to start a small photography studio producing portraits and commercial assignments in a rented shop and dwelling at 344 Punt Road, South Yarra, in the 'Sharp's Buildings' terrace. There, he held further exhibitions and was commissioned by The Australian Ballet as stills photographer on Robert Helpmann's and Rudoph Nureyev's Don Quixote, through which he met Hungarian actor and filmmaker Tibor Markus who was to produce Cox's first feature Illuminations.

In the late 1960s Cox had travelled to Papua New Guinea with linguist Ulli Beier whose interest was indigenous poetry, drama and creative writing. In the resulting 1971 book Cox's photographs of village life were set to poems written by Beier's students. Beier and Cox later published a book on Mirka Mora Also in 1971, Cox won a trip to London in the "Age of Aquarius" contest for professional photographers organised by Ilford (Australia) Pty. Ltd.

== Lecturer in film ==
With little experience in the medium, apart from making short Super 8 movies with friend Bernard Eddy, Cox was appointed by Lenton Parr as a teacher of cinematography at Prahran College of Advanced Education in 1968, an experience he recalls in his autobiography as formative:

Apart from the few Super-8 movies I had made and some more serious attempts on 16mm, I knew nothing about filmmaking. I was forced to stay one step ahead of the students. That's how I became a filmmaker.

The film course received some $15,000 funding in August 1970 (a value of $180,000 in 2019) with which Head of the Art School Ted Worsley purchased cine cameras, a Steenbeck editing suite, film processor and Nagra tape deck. Always working with small budgets, Cox used the equipment in making The Journey (1972) and Illuminations (1975), with Prahran drama lecturer Alan Money on the cast, and in 1994 featured 43 paintings by colleague Eleanor Hart in Touch Me. Students were recruited, both as practical education for them and as a saving for the budding director, to serve as the film crews on Cox's Mirka (1970), and documentaries All Set Backstage (1974), We Are All Alone My Dear (1975), and For a Child Called Michael (1980). We Are All Alone My Dear, a portrait of novelist Jean Campbell in a home for the elderly, was made with $1,000 and brought Cox his first breakthrough, with an award for documentary film.

Cox turned his unneeded photography studio over to The Photographers' Gallery and Workshop which he founded with Ingeborg Tyssen, John F. Williams and Rod McNicoll in 1973. He remained at Prahran College until 1980 and with Athol Shmith, and John Cato about whom Cox later co-edited a biography, influenced a number of photographers and filmmakers, including artist Bill Henson, photojournalists Phil Quirk and Andrew Chapman, and Carol Jerrems, one of whose earliest exhibitions he showed in the Gallery.

== Filmmaker ==
Cox's Kostas (1979) about a Greek taxi driver's (Takis Emmanuel) stormy love affair in Melbourne with a career woman (Wendy Hughes), was more successful in Europe than in Australia. At first no one was interested in Cox's first film script for Lonely Hearts, but Phillip Adams found it promising and introduced Cox to the writer John Clarke. It was declared the best film of 1982 and received enthusiastic response at film festivals in London, New Delhi and San Francisco. Its success brought the attention and financial support for Cox's production of a rapid series of feature films.

Cox maintained his loyalty to screenwriters including John Clarke and Bob Ellis and to certain actors. His film-essay The Remarkable Mr. Kaye (2005) is a portrait of his friend, then seriously ill, the actor Norman Kaye, who appeared in numerous Cox films, such as Lonely Hearts (1982) and Man of Flowers (1983).

In 2006 Cox became the Patron of the Byron Bay Film Festival.

On 26 December 2009 Cox received a liver transplant. David Bradbury's 2012 documentary, On Borrowed Time, tells this story against the backdrop of his life and work, through interviews with Cox and his friends and colleagues. Cox has also written a memoir, Tales from the Cancer Ward. Rosie Igusti, a fellow transplant recipient he met there, later became his partner.

Cox's last film Force of Destiny, with David Wenham and Indian actress Shahana Goswami, was released in July 2015. Wenham plays a sculptor and transplant patient who falls in love with a patient he meets in the hospital ward. Cox attended the American premiere of Force of Destiny at the Ebertfest Film Festival in Chicago, having travelled with Rosie via stops in Bangkok, Dubai, and Frankfurt in order to avert the effects of travel on their delicate health. He had been invited to speak after the screening, and did so, and was named in Phillip Adams' List of 100 National Treasures in April 2015. On 18 June 2016, he died at the age of 76.

== Actor ==
Cox appeared in small parts, some uncredited, in several films including: as a photographer in Apostasy (1979) and Where the Green Ants Dream (1984), a mortician in To Market to Market (1987), with Gosia Dobrowolska as her murdered lover in Careful (1992), as a New Age customer in his own Lust and Revenge (1996), and in the shorts The Liver and To Music (both 2013). He appeared as himself in Peter Watkin's The Media Project.

== Critical response ==
John Larkin, in his introduction to Tales from the cancer ward writes that:

Cox could have gone the Hollywood way. But he has kept his distance from producers, whom he considers predatory as they dominate the industry. He is very critical of what he sees as their betrayal of a once great art, cinema, into a crude kind of consumer culture. He has fought hard to stay independent, choosing to make films about people's inner lives, rather than the ephemeral world in which appearance is everything: the great glamour, the great illusion. His company is called Illumination Films. The Cox collection has longevity. His major films [will] continue to feature overseas and in Australia.

Actor on several Cox films David Wenham considers that:

There is no one like Cox. He is unique, and we need him, and people like him. I watched Molokai a little while ago: it's unmistakably a Paul Cox film. He is completely an auteur, because everything you see on the screen, and hear, has got Paul's fingerprints all over it. Ninety per cent of his take on the world, I would agree with.

Victoria Duckett, in evaluating the references to a painting by Titian in Cox's Man of Flowers, and evoking Cox's migrating to Australia by sea, sees a European Romanticism at work:

From this perspective, Cox’s Romanticism is uniquely Australian. By putting himself into the picture and putting the sea back into the frame, he explains our physical and metaphysical place in the world.

In a contrary view typical of much Australian criticism of Cox, Vikki Riley in a 1995 Filmnews article condemns such "Europhile fetishes with lost connections and individuals' fragmented and uprooted lives - where the act of remembrance is a Proustian sensory pulse which unveils a seemingly bottomless pit of an inner narrative world driven by languid melancholia, inevitable destiny, missed opportunities and the heavy clouds of war," as precisely "the sorts of passions avoided by Australian filmmakers, save for the whining cultural cringe expressed in the works of Paul Cox, Ian Pringle, et al."

== Personal life ==
Cox had three children to three different women, and had an eight year romantic relationship with Gosia Dobrowolska with whom he acted in Careful (1992), and who was 'Terese' in his Golden Braid (1990), 'Anna' in A Woman's Tale (1991), 'Sarah' in Touch Me (1993), and 'Cecilia Applebaum' in Lust and Revenge (1996).

== Publications ==
=== Biographies ===
- Cox, W., & Cox, P. (1997). Ich bin. Pulheim/Köln: Schuffelen
- Autobiography Reflections: An Autobiographical Journey in 1998.
- Cox, Paul (2011). Tales from the Cancer Ward. Transit Lounge. ISBN 9780980846232.

=== Photography books ===
- Cox, Paul (1970). Human Still Lives from Nepal. s.n. (Mentone, Vic.: Alexander Bros.)
- Cox, Paul, & Ulli Beier (1971). Home of Man: The People of New Guinea. Melbourne: Thomas Nelson (Australia)
- Beier, Ulli, & Paul Cox (1980). Mirka. South Melbourne, Victoria: Macmillan.

== Exhibitions ==
- 1977 Australian Centre for Photography, Sydney: Photography by Athol Shmith and Paul Cox
- 2009 Charles Nodrum Gallery, Melbourne: Paul Cox, 6 – 29 August
- 2011 Mars Gallery, Melbourne: Paul Cox
- 2011 Monash Gallery of Art: Age of Aquarius: Photography of Paul Cox, 7 April – 19 June

== Filmography ==
=== Features ===
- Illuminations (1976)
- Inside Looking Out (1977)
- Kostas (1979)
- Lonely Hearts (1982)
- Man of Flowers (1983)
- My First Wife (1984)
- Cactus (1986)
- Island (1989)
- Golden Braid (1990)
- A Woman's Tale (1991)
- The Nun and the Bandit (1992)
- Exile (1994)
- Lust and Revenge (1996)
- Molokai: The Story of Father Damien (1999)
- Innocence (2000)
- The Diaries of Vaslav Nijinsky (2001)
- Human Touch (2004)
- Salvation (2008)
- Force Of Destiny (2015)

=== Shorts ===
- Matuta: An Early Morning Fantasy (1965) – 23 min colour film
- Time Past (1966) – 10 min b/w film
- The Prince Henry's Medical Team in Vietnam (1966) – 14 min colour film
- The Prince Henry's Story (1968) – 17 min b/w film
- Skindeep (1968) – 40 min drama colour 16mm film
- Marcel (1969) – 7 min b/w 16 mm film
- Symphony (1969) – 12 mins film
- Mirka (1970) – 20 mins film
- Phyllis (1971) – 35 mins colour 16mm film
- The Journey (1972) – 60 mins drama film
- The Island (1975) – 10 min colour 16 mm film
- Ways of Seeing (1977) – 24 min film
- Ritual (1978) – 10 min film
- Touch Me (1993)

=== Documentaries ===
- Calcutta (1970) – 16mm, 30 mins
- All Set Backstage (1974) – 16mm, 22 mins
- We Are All Alone My Dear (1975) – 16mm, 22 mins
- For a Child Called Michael (1979) – 16mm, 30 mins
- The Kingdom of Nek Chand (1980) – 16mm, 22 mins
- Underdog (1980) – 16mm, 53 mins
- Death and Destiny (1984) 16mm, 120 mins
- Vincent (1987) 35mm, 95 mins
- The Hidden Dimension (1997) – 43 mins IMAX film
- The Remarkable Mr. Kaye (2005)
- Kaluapapa Heavan (2007)
- The Dinner Party (2012)

=== TV ===
- Paper Boy (1985) (TV)
- Handle With Care (1985)
- The Secret Life of Trees (1986) – 25 min TV film
- The Gift (1988)
- Touch Me (1993) – 30 min TV episode

== Awards ==
- 1971 Winner 'Age of Aquarius' Ilford Photography Award
- 1982 Australian Film Institute - National Film Awards - Lonely Hearts - Best Film
- 1984 Valladolid International Film Festival – Golden Spike: Man of Flowers
- 1984 AFI Award – Best Director & Best Screenplay: My First Wife
- 1986 Flanders International Film Festival – Golden Spur: My First Wife
- 1991 Human Rights and Equal Opportunity Commission Feature Film Award for A Women's Tale
- 1992 Flanders International Film Festival – Golden Spur: A Woman's Tale
- 1993 Brisbane International Film Festival – Chauvel Award: for distinguished contribution to Australian Cinema
- 1994 44th Berlin International Film Festival – Golden Bear (nominated): Exile
- 2000 Taormina International Film Festival – FIPRESCI Prize: Innocence
- 2000 Montréal World Film Festival – Grand Prix des Amériques: Innocence
- 2000 IF Awards – Best Feature Film: Innocence
- 2003 Montréal International Festival of Films on Art – Jury Prize: The Diaries of Vaslav Nijinsky
- 2004 Montréal World Film Festival – Grand Prix des Amériques: Human Touch
