= List of Australian films of 1987 =

== 1987 ==
Title	Director	Cast	Genre	Notes
Army Wives	Denny Lawrence	Julie Nihill, Philip Quast, Lian Lunson, Shane Connor, Peter Sumner, Marilyn Allen, Russell Newman, Linda Newton, Val Lehman	Drama / Romance / War TV film	
Around the World in Eighty Ways	Stephen MacLean	Philip Quast, Allan Penney, Gosia Dobrowolska, Diana Davidson, Kelly Dingwall, Judith Fisher, John Howard, Kaarin Fairfax, Frank Lloyd, Richard Carter	Comedy	IMDb
Aussified	Ralph Lawrence Marsden	Chris Waters, Amanda McNamara, Bronwyn Gibbs	Drama	IMDb
Australian Dream	Jackie McKimmie	Noni Hazlehurst, Graeme Blundell, John Jarratt, Barry Rugless, Jenny Mansfield, Caine O'Connel, James Ricketson	Comedy / Drama Feature film	IMDb
Australian Made: The Movie	Richard Lowenstein	Michael Hutchence, Andrew Farriss, Tim Farriss, Kirk Pengilly, Garry Gary Beers, INXS, Zan Abeyratne, Kate Ceberano, I'm Talking, Christina Amphlett Divinyls, Chris Bailey, The Saints	Rock / Music Feature film	IMDb
Bachelor Girl	Rivka Hartman	Lyn Pierse, Kim Gyngell, Jan Friedl, Bruce Spence, Doug Tremlett, Ruth Yaffe, Monica Maughan,Mark Little, John Flaus, Jane Turner, Tim Robertson	Comedy / Romance Feature film	IMDb aka: "Passionately Single"
Backstage	Jonathan Hardy	Laura Branigan, Michael Aitkens, Noel Ferrier, Rowena Wallace, Kim Gyngell, Ian Mune, Philip Holder, Len Kaserman, Simon Westaway, John Frawley	Drama Feature film	IMDb
Belinda	Pamela Gibbons	Deanne Jeffs, Mary Regan, John Jarratt, Hazel Phillips, Kaarin Fairfax, Alan Cassell, Caz Lederman, Nico Lathouris, Gerda Nicolson, Joy Smithers	Biography / Drama Feature film	
The Bit Part	Brendan Maher	Chris Haywood, Nicole Kidman, Katrina Foster, John Wood, Maurie Fields, Maureen Edwards, Maggie Millar, Deborra-Lee Furness	Comedy / Drama Feature film	IMDb
Brainblast	Andy Neyl	Julie Mitchell, Lisa-Jane Stockwell, Cathy Jukes, Toby Jones, James Scanlon	Comedy / Sci-fi Feature film	
Bullseye	Carl Schultz	Paul Goddard, Kathryn Walker, John Wood, Paul Chubb, Bruce Spence, Lynette Curran, John Meillon, Kerry Walker	Adventure / Western Feature film	IMDb
Coda	Craig Lahiff	Penny Cook, Arna-Maria Winchester, Liddy Clark, Olivia Hamnett, Patrick Frost, Bob Newman, Adrian Shirley, Hedley Cullen, Vivienne Greaves	Thriller TV film	
Computer Ghosts	Marcus Cole	Nicholas Ryan, Emily Symons, Peter Whitford, Robbie McGregor, Christine Jeston, Noel Ferrier, Scott Burgess, Benita Collings, George Spartels	Drama / Fantasy TV film	aka Crooksnatchers / Hold The Circus
Contagion	Karl Zwicky	John Doyle, Nicola Bartlett, Ray Barrett, Pamela Hawksford, Jacqueline Brennan, Chris Betts, Reginald Cameron, Michael Simpson, Allen Harvey, Nathalie Gaffney	Horror / Thriller Feature film	
Danger Down Under	Russ Mayberry	Lee Majors, Rebecca Gilling, Martin Vaughan, William Wallace, Bruce Hughes, Morgan Lewis, Moya O'Sullivan, Natalie McCurry, Georgie Parker, Paul Chubb, Patsy Stephen	Drama TV film / TV Pilot US Co-production	aka Harris Down Under (US) / Austral Downs / The Hawkesbury
Dangerous Game	Stephen Hopkins	Marcus Graham, Miles Buchanan, Sandie Lillingston, John Polson, Kathryn Walker	Drama / Horror / Thriller Feature film	IMDb
Dark Age	Arch Nicholson	John Jarratt, Nikki Coghill, Max Phipps, Burnum Burnum, David Gulpilil, Ray Meagher, Jeff Ashby, Paul Bertram, Ken Radley, Ron Blanchard, Gerry Duggan, James Fitzgerald	Horror / Thriller Feature film	IMDb
Day of the Panther	Brian Trenchard-Smith	Edward John Stazak, John Stanton, Jim Richards, Michael Carman, Zale Daniel, Paris Jefferson, Matthew Quatermaine, Linda Megier, Brian Fitzsimmons, Joe Schwaiger	Action / Drama TV film	
Dear Cardholder	Bill Bennett	Robin Ramsay, Jennifer Cluff, Marion Chirgwin, Russell Newman, John Ewart, Peter Kowitz, Patrick Cook, Arianthe Galani, Bob Ellis	Comedy Feature film	IMDb
Dogs in Space	Richard Lowenstein	Michael Hutchence, Saskia Post, Nique Needles, Deanna Bond, Tony Helou, Chris Haywood	Drama Feature film	IMDb
Dot and the Smugglers	Yoram Gross	Barbara Frawley, Ross Higgins, Robyn Moore	Animation / Family	IMDB
Dot Goes to Hollywood	Yoram Gross	Barbara Frawley, Ross Higgins, Robyn Moore	Animation / Family	IMDb
Echoes of Paradise	Phillip Noyce	Wendy Hughes, John Lone, Steve Jacobs, Rod Mullinar, Peta Toppano, Claudia Karvan, Rebecca Smart, Gillian Jones, Lynda Stoner	Drama / Romance Feature film	aka Shadows Of The Peacock IMDb
The Edge of Power	Henri Safran	Ivar Kants, Sheree da Costa, Henri Szeps, Anna-Maria Monticelli, Warwick Moss, Peter Corbett, Ric Hutton, John Stone, Vic Rooney, John Orcsik, Katherine Thomson	Thriller TV film	IMDb
The Facts of Life Down Under	Stuart Margolin	Cloris Leachman, Lisa Welchel, Kim Fields, Mindy Cohn, Mackenzie Astin, Nancy McKeon, Mario van Peebles, Joss McWilliam, Noel Trevarthen, Gary Waddell, Joan Bruce, Sally Martin, Annie Byron	Drama TV film US Co-production	
Feathers	John Ruane	Rebecca Gilling, James Laurie, Julie Forsyth	Drama Short film	IMDb, Screened at the 1987 Cannes Film Festival
Fever	Craig Lahiff	Bill Hunter, Gary Sweet, Mary Regan, Lawrence Matt, Peter Goerecke, Rodney van der Wall, Carmel Young, Adrian Shirley, Jim Holt	Action / Thriller Feature film	
The First Kangaroos	Frank Cvitanovich	Dennis Waterman, Chris Haywood, Dominic Sweeney, Philip Quast, Tony Martin, Nell Schofield, Clarissa Kaye-Mason, Jim Carter, Kelly Dingwall, Ian Gilmour, Andrew Ettingshausen, Wayne Pearce	Biography / Sports TV film	IMDb
Frenchman's Farm	Ron Way	Tracey Tainsh, David Reyne, Norman Kaye	Adventure	IMDb
Future Past	Rob Stewart	Nicholas Ryan, Imogene Annesley, John Ley, Cornelia Frances, Paula Duncan, Paul Blackwell, Doug Scroope, Cecily Polson, Bruce Venables, Gary Down	Drama / Fantasy TV film	aka The Colonial Cavalry
Gallagher's Travels	Michael Caulfield	Ivar Kants, Joanne Samuel, Stuart Campbell	Action	IMDb
The Good Wife	Ken Cameron	Rachel Ward, Bryan Brown, Steven Vidler,	Drama / Romance Feature film	IMDb aka The Umbrella Woman
Ground Zero	Bruce Myles, Michael Pattinson	Colin Friels, Jack Thompson, Donald Pleasence, Natalie Bate, Burnum Burnum, Simon Chilvers, Steve Dodd, Kim Gyngell, Neil Fitzpatrick, Mark Mitchell, Alan Hopgood, Brian James, Bob Maza, Peter Cummins	Action / Drama Feature film	IMDb, Entered into the 38th Berlin International Film Festival
Hard Knuckle	Lex Marinos	Steve Bisley, Richard Moir, Gary Day, David Jay, Esben Storm, Susan Leith, John Sheerin, Bob Baines, Paul Chubb	Drama TV film	Original title: Was There A Dream aka Knuckle
High Tide	Gillian Armstrong	Judy Davis, Jan Adele, Claudia Karvan, Frankie J. Holden, Colin Friels, Toni Scanlan, Monica Trapaga, Barry Rugless, Bob Purtell, Mark Hembrow	Drama Feature film	IMDb
Howling III: The Marsupials	Philippe Mora	Barry Otto, Imogene Annesley, Leigh Biolos, Ralph Cotterill, Dasha Blahova, Carole Skinner, Glenda Linscott, Barry Humphries, Bill Collins	Comedy / Horror / Thriller Feature film	IMDb
Hungry Heart	Luigi Acquisto	Nick Carrafa, Kimberly Davenport, Lisa Schouw, Norman Kaye, John Flaus, Sheila Florance, Osvaldo Maione, Mark Rogers, Gaetano Scollo, Dasha Blahova	Drama Feature film	IMDb
Initiation	Michael Pearce	Rodney Harvey, Bruno Lawrence, Miranda Otto, Arna-Maria Winchester, Bobby Smith, Tony Barry, Luciano Catanacci, Mladen Mladenov, Vuong Nguyen, Bob Maza	Adventure / Thriller Feature film	IMDb
I've Come About the Suicide	Sophia Turkiewicz	Barry Otto, Gosia Dobrowolska, Ralph Cotterill, Duncan Wass, Gwen Plumb, Gary Down, Jonathan Biggins, Ron Stephenson, Louise Fox, Patrick Ward	Comedy / Fantasy TV film	Original title: Pigs Can Fly
Jilted	Bill Bennett	Richard Moir, Jennifer Cluff, Steve Jacobs, Helen Mutkins, Ken Radley, Tina Bursill	Drama / Romance Feature film	
Les Patterson Saves the World	George T. Miller	Barry Humphries, Pamela Stephenson, Thaao Penghlis, Andrew Clarke, Henri Szeps, Hugh Keays-Byrne, Garth Meade, Esben Storm, Joy Westmore, Christine Hill, Graham Kennedy, Gabrielle Fitzpatrick, Joan Rivers, Sally Tayler, John Clarke	Comedy / Fantasy Feature film	IMDb
The Lighthorsemen	Simon Wincer	Jon Blake, Peter Phelps, Tony Bonner, John Walton, Gary Sweet, Tim McKenzie, Sigrid Thornton, Anthony Andrews, Gerard Kennedy, Serge Lazareff, Ralph Cotterill, Shane Briant, Nick Waters, John Larking, Di O'Connor, Bill Kerr, Grant Piro	Action / Drama / War Feature film	IMDb
A Matter of Convenience	Ben Lewin	Jean-Pierre Cassell, Deborra-Lee Furness, John Clarke, Kym Amad, Dalibor Satalic, Mark Little, Kirk Alexander, Marion Heathfield, Peter Hosking, Cliff Ellen, Peter Moon	Comedy / Drama ABC TV film	
Nepal: Where the Legends Live	Denise G. Cox		Short	IMDb
Nice Coloured Girls	Tracey Moffatt	Janelle Court, Fiona George, Gayle Mabo	Short	IMDb
The Nights Belong to the Novelist: Elizabeth Jolley, Australian Writer	Christina Wilcox	Ruth Cracknell, Kerry Walker	Documentary / Short film	IMDb
Olive	Stephen Wallace	Kerry McGuire, Nick Tate, Paddy Costa,	ABC TV film	IMDb
Outback Vampires	Colin Eggleston	Richard Morgan, Angela Kennedy, Brett Climo, John Doyle, Maggie Blinco, David Gibson, Antonia Murphy, Richard Carter, Lucky Grills	Comedy / Horror TV film	IMDb aka: "The Wicked" in the USA
Palisade	Laurie McInnes		Short	IMDb
Pandemonium	Haydn Keenan	David Argue, Amanda Dole, Esben Storm, Arna-Maria Winchester, Kerry Mack, Mercia Deane-Johns, Gary Foley, Ignatius Jones, Lex Marinos	Comedy / Fantasy Feature film	
The Perfectionist	Chris Thomson	Jacki Weaver, John Waters, Adam Willits	Comedy	IMDb
Pieta	Monique Schwarz	Maggie Millar, Sally Cooper, Tony Rickards, David Blackman, Maud Clark	Drama ABC TV film	IMDb
A Place To Call Home	Russ Mayberry	Linda Lavin, Lane Smith, Maggie Fitzgibbon, Lori Loughlin, Robert MacNaughton, Paul Cronin, Patricia Patts, Richard Azzaga, Tamsin West, Mervyn Drake	Drama TV film US Co-production	
The Place at the Coast	George Ogilvie	John Hargreaves, Heather Mitchell, Tushka Bergen, Margo Lee, Willie Fennell, Garry McDonald, Ray Meagher	Drama / Romance Feature film	IMDb
Resan	Peter Watkins	Francine Bastien, Brian Mulroney, Mila Mulroney	Documentary / War	IMDb
The Right Hand Man	Di Drew	Rupert Everett, Hugo Weaving, Arthur Dignam, Ralph Cotterill, Adam Cockburn, Tim Elliot, Jack Allen, John Spicer, Brian Scrymgeour, Pat Bishop, Jennifer Claire	Drama / Romance Feature film	IMDb
Rock 'N' Roll Cowboys	Rob Stewart	Peter Phelps, David Franklin, Nikki Coghill, Ben Franklin, Dee Krainz, John Doyle	Drama TV film	aka Uncle Sam's at the Door
Running from the Guns	John Dixon	Jon Blake, Mark Hembrow, Nikki Coghill, Terence Donovan, Bill Kerr, Peter Whitford, Warwick Sims, Patrick Ward, Gerard Kennedy, Linda Megier, Simon Westaway, Toni Lamond, Delilah	Action / Crime Feature film	IMDb
Shaka Zulu	William C. Faure	Edward Fox, Robert Powell, Trevor Howard	TV Mini Series	IMDb
Slate, Wyn & Me	Don McLennan	Sigrid Thornton, Simon Burke, Martin Sacks, Tommy Lewis, Lesley Baker, Simon Westaway, Peter Cummins	Action / Crime Feature film	IMDb
Spineless	Alex Proyas	Cathy Linsley, Andrew McPhail, Alex Proyas	Short	IMDb
Those Dear Departed	Ted Robinson	Garry McDonald, Pamela Stephenson, Su Cruickshank, John Clarke, Graeme Blundell, Ignatius Jones, Antonia Murphy, Jonathan Biggins, Arthur Dignam	Comedy / Fantasy Feature film	IMDb aka: "Ghosts CAN Do It" in the USA
The Time Guardian	Brian Hannant	Tom Burlinson, Nikki Coghill, Carrie Fisher, Dean Stockwell, Damon Sanders, Jim Holt, Harry Salter, Jo Flemming, Tim Robertson. Narrator Kirk Alexander	Action / Sci-fi Feature film	IMDb
To Market to Market	Virginia Rouse	Philip Quast, Maureen Edwards, Noel Trevarthen, Marcus Gollings, Kate Reid, Tony Llewellyn-Jones, Maureen Edwards, Wayne Cull, Genevieve Picot	Drama Feature film	IMDb
Travelling North	Carl Schultz	Leo McKern, Julia Blake, Graham Kennedy, Henri Szeps, Michele Fawdon, Diane Craig, Drew Forsythe, Andrea Moor, Genevieve Mooy, John Gregg	Comedy / Drama / Romance Feature film	IMDb
Twelfth Night	Neil Armfield	Gillian Jones, Ivar Kants, Jacquy Phillips, Peter Cummins, Kerry Walker, John Wood, Jim Holt, Geoffrey Rush, Tracy Harvey, Odile Le Clezio	Comedy / Drama Feature film	IMDb
Vincent	Paul Cox	John Hurt, Marika Rivera, Gabriella Trsek	Animation / Biography	IMDb
Watch the Shadows Dance	Mark Joffe	Tom Jennings, Vince Martin, Nicole Kidman, Joanne Samuel, Jeremy Shadlow, Craig Pearce, Doug Parkinson, Alexander Broun, Laurence Clifford	Action / Drama TV film	IMDb aka: "Nightmaster" in North America
With Love to the Person Next to Me	Brian McKenzie	Kim Gyngell, Paul Chubb, Barry Dickins, Beverley Gardiner, Phil Motherwell, Mark Mitchell, Sally McKenzie	Drama Feature film	IMDb
With Time to Kill	James Clayden	Ian Scott, Elizabeth Huntley, Jan Friedl, James Clayden, Janet Golding, John Howard, Barry Dickins, Peter Green, Tim Robertson	Drama / Thriller Feature film	IMDb
The Year My Voice Broke	John Duigan	Noah Taylor, Ben Mendelsohn, Leone Carmen, Graeme Blundell, Lynette Curran, Malcolm Robertson, Judi Farr, Tim Robertson, Harold Hopkins, Nick Tate, Vincent Ball, Allan Penney, Colleen Clifford, Bruce Spence	Drama / Romance Feature film	IMDb

== See also ==
- 1987 in Australia
- 1987 in Australian television
