= Jennifer Cluff =

Australian actor and film producer

- Born: 1956 (age 69–70); Mudgee, New South Wales, Australia
- Occupations: Actor, film producer, dramaturge
- Years active: 1973–present
- Known for: Seven Little Australians (1973); Kiss or Kill (1996); In a Savage Land (1999)

Jennifer Cluff (b 1956) is an Australian actor and film producer.

== Early life ==
Cluff was born in 1956 in the country town of Mudgee in central west New South Wales.

== Career ==
Cluff's professional acting career began when she was seventeen and cast in the 1973 miniseries, Seven Little Australians. She is known for her roles in 1996 thriller Kiss or Kill and 1999 drama In a Savage Land. She is also a producer, known for skater film Deck Dogz (2005) and biographical film The Way, My Way (2024), the latter of which she also acted in.

Cluff is also a dramaturge and script editor. She has worked on both screenplays and novels for major publishing houses.

== Personal life ==
Cluff has been married to Bill Bennett (with whom she often collaborates), since 1982.

== Filmography ==
=== Film ===
==== As actor ====
Year	Title	Role	Notes
1980	Final Cut	Sarah	
1982	Brothers	Alison Lewis	
1985	A Street to Die	Lorraine Turner	
1986	Backlash	Waitress	
1987	Dear Cardholder	Aggie Smith	
1987	Jilted	Harry	
1994	Spider & Rose	Helen Dougherty	
1997	Kiss or Kill	Bel Jones	
2002	The Nugget	Coco	
2024	The Way, My Way	Jennifer	

==== As producer ====
Year	Title	Role	Notes
1997	Kiss or Kill	Producer / casting	
1999	In a Savage Land	Producer / writer	
2000	Cut	Producer	
2001	Tempted	Producer	
2002	The Nugget	Producer / casting	
2005	Deck Dogz	Producer / casting	
2017	PGS: Intuition Is Your Personal Guidance System	Producer	
2022	Facing Fear	Producer	Documentary film
2024	The Way, My Way	Producer	

=== Television ===
Year	Title	Role	Notes
1972	Number 96	Pandora Scott	
1973	Seven Little Australians	Judy 'Helen' Woolcot	Miniseries, 10 episodes
1974	Class of ‘75	Jill Ogilvy	
1974	Silent Number	Jodie	Season 1, episode 13: "The Final Silence"
1974	Out of Love		Anthology series, episode 1: "I Don't Want To Know"
1975	Ben Hall	Catherine	Miniseries, episode 11: "The Legacy"
1977	Going Home	Stella	TV movie
1977	Glenview High	Sally	Episode 11: "The Trainee"
1977	Young Ramsay	Elsie Barton	Season 1, episode 7: "The Mystery of the Bora Hills"
1979	Cop Shop	Lorraine Nelson	Episode #1.140
1983	The Cattle King	Young Isabel Kidman	Documentary TV movie
1988	The Flying Doctors	Miriam Sutton	Season 3, episode 13: "Hopscotch"
1989	A Country Practice	Liz Spicer	Season 9, 2 episodes
1992	Mother and Son	Carrie Samuels	Season 5, episode 5: "The Rest"
1997	Murder Call	Elly Jago	Season 1, episode 8: "Last Stop"
1997	Simone de Beauvoir's Babies	Brenda	Miniseries, 4 episodes
