= Geoffrey Simpson =

Australian cinematographer

- Born: Geoffrey Randolph Allen Simpson; Adelaide, South Australia, Australia
- Occupation: Cinematographer

Geoffrey Randolph Allen Simpson is an Australian cinematographer.

== Career ==
Born in Adelaide, South Australia, Simpson graduated from the South Australian School of Art in 1969, and the London Film School.

Simpson has received critical praise for his work on films including Shine, Oscar and Lucinda (1997) and Romulus, My Father (2007). He has won Australian Film Institute awards for Best Cinematography for The Navigator: A Medieval Odyssey (1988), Shine and Oscar and Lucinda.

== Filmography ==
- 1981: Centrespread
- 1986: Playing Beatie Bow
- 1987: Jilted
- 1987: Initiation
- 1988: Boundaries of the Heart
- 1988: The Navigator: A Medieval Odyssey
- 1988: Celia
- 1990: Till There Was You
- 1990: Green Card
- 1991: Fried Green Tomatoes
- 1992: The Last Days of Chez Nous
- 1993: Mr. Wonderful
- 1994: The War
- 1994: Little Women
- 1996: Shine
- 1996: Some Mother's Son
- 1997: Oscar and Lucinda
- 1999: Life
- 2000: Center Stage
- 2001: Glitter
- 2002: Black and White
- 2003: Paradise Found
- 2003: Under the Tuscan Sun
- 2006: Last Holiday
- 2007: Romulus, My Father
- 2008: The Tender Hook
- 2008: Ali & the Ball
- 2009: Dear Diary
- 2011: The Dragon Pearl
- 2011: Sleeping Beauty
- 2012: The Sessions
- 2012: Satellite Boy
- 2017: Cargo
- 2017: Please Stand By
