= Melvin, Son of Alvin =

1984 Australian film by John Eastway

- Directed by: John Eastway
- Written by: Morris Gleitzman
- Produced by: James McElory
- Starring: Gerry Sont; Graeme Blundell
- Cinematography: Ross Berryman
- Edited by: John Hollands
- Music by: Colin Stead
- Production companies: McElroy & McElroy
- Distributed by: Roadshow Films
- Release date: 20 December 1984
- Country: Australia
- Language: English
- Budget: A$2.3 million
- Box office: A$751,143 (Australia)

Melvin, Son of Alvin is a 1984 Australian comedy film. It is a sequel to Alvin Purple, but also was released in the United States and the United Kingdom under the title Foreplay.

== Premise ==
Dee Tanner, a television reporter, is doing an article on the sexiest man on Earth. She tracks down Alvin Purple and discovers he has a son, Melvin, who is similarly irresistible to women. However, Melvin is scared of women, and is a virgin.

Melvin begins a relationship with a young Greek-Australian girl, Gloria, whose mother is very protective of her. The television reporter reunites Melvin with his father, who is performing as a nightclub singer and is the leader of a cult called the 'Purple People'.

== Cast ==
- Gerry Sont as Melvin Purple
- Lenita Psillakis as Gloria
- Jon Finlayson as Burnbaum
- Tina Bursill as Dee Tanner
- Colin McEwan as Mr. Simpson
- Abigail as Mrs. Simpson
- David Argue as Cameraman
- Arianthe Galani as Mrs. Giannis
- Graeme Blundell as Alvin Purple
- Steve Bastoni as Bullo
- Katy Manning as Estelle
- Rhonda Burchmore as Phillipa

== Production ==
Production of the film was twice delayed when major backers pulled out prior to the filming date. Before the film's release, three cuts were ordered to enable the movie to get an M rating.

== Reception ==
Filmink magazine later said "the success of T&A American comedies in the early 80s seems to have inspired this late sequel, which took the one joke concept (homely man is irresistible to women) and made it a no-joke concept by making it about a handsome male model type who is irresistible to women, replacing that with various Porky's-era tropes".
