= Mortgage (film) =

- Directed by: Bill Bennett
- Written by: Bill Bennett
- Produced by: Bruce Moir
- Starring: Brian Vriends; Doris Younane; Bruce Venables; Andrew S. Gilbert
- Production company: Film Australia
- Distributed by: Network Nine (TV); Home Cinema Group (video)
- Release date: 11 April 1990 (TV)
- Running time: 98 mins
- Country: Australia
- Language: English

Mortgage is a 1990 Australian drama film directed by Bill Bennett.

== Plot ==
Dave and Tina Dodd want to buy a house. They make a contract with shifty John Napper who suggests builder George Shooks.

== Production ==
The film was one of a series of drama documentaries produced at Film Australia for the Nine Network dealing with social issues. It was filmed using hand held cameras. The actors improvised their parts based on workshopping scenes and had real people in small roles as professionals. Others in the series included Prejudice.

Bill Bennett described it as one of his favourite films.
