= Island (1989 film) =

- Directed by: Paul Cox
- Written by: Paul Cox
- Produced by: Paul Cox; Santhana Naidu
- Starring: Irene Papas; Eve Sitta; Anoja Weerasinghe; Chris Haywood
- Production company: Illumination Films
- Release date: October 1989
- Running time: 95 minutes
- Country: Australia
- Languages: English; Greek
- Budget: A$2 million
- Box office: A$114,764 (Australia)

Island is a 1989 Australian film directed by Paul Cox starring Irene Papas as Marquise.

It is not to be confused with the 1975 short film of the same title also made by Cox.

== Plot ==
Three women meet on a Greek island: Eva, a Czech born Australian with a drug addiction; Sahana, a Sri Lankan abandoned by her political activist husband; and Marquisa, an older Greek. All are exiles. A Frenchman arrives on the island and gives drugs to Eva. Janis, a deaf mute who is friends with all three women, discover what the Frenchman is up to and has him expelled. When he returns, Janis accidentally kills him and the three women help hide the body. Sahana hears that her husband is killed and decides to leave the island.

== Cast ==
- Irene Papas as Marquise
- Chris Haywood as Janis
- Eva Sitta as Eva
- Anoja Weerasinghe as Sahana
- Norman Kaye as Henry
- François Bernard

== Production ==
The film was shot on Astypalaia, a Greek island in the Agean Sea, in 1988 over ten weeks. It was based on an island Cox visited eighteen years earlier.

The shoot was plagued with money shortages, making it extremely difficult. Irene Papas said "I felt a lot of freedom on this film. It was a very fast shoot but if you know what you are doing, like Paul, it's nice to do it fast and well."

Finance came from Film Victoria.

Cox had a long affinity with Greece:

The first time I went to Greece I realised I had been homesick and I never knew where it was for.... There was no home here; I was always drifting between places. When I got to Greece the first time and met these people... a Greek is a Greek and every day is the first and last day of their lives, as has been said, 'Wherever I travel, Greece wounds me'. There's incredible belonging and I envy that very much. I love Greece for that.

== Reception ==
=== Awards ===
The film was nominated for seven Australian Film Institute Awards, including Best Picture, Best Actress (Irene Papas), Best Actor (Chris Haywood), Best Screenplay and Best Director.

=== Critical ===
The Sydney Morning Herald called it "deceptively modest: touching and full of simple observations".

Filmnews called it "a film which veers towards incoherence... an undisciplined film... Since Cactus, Cox seems to be tailoring his films more and more to this market, self-consciously making "art" films in the worst sense. To me, however, his no longer has an emotional coherence and true sense of place, a reflection perhaps of his own sense of being not quite at home anywhere."

Cinema Papers wrote "the film has all the appropriate signs of human feelings — long gazes, 'meaningful' pauses, tearful goodbyes — but somehow these come across as superficial or not vividly expressed."

Critic Jan Epstein wrote the "cliched characterisations, emblem atic rather than original, suggest that Cox is at his best when he explores a perplexed, urban Australian consciousness."

The Canberra Times called it "not Cox's best work. But despite its shortcomings, it offers enough to remind us that he remains Australia's leading artist of cinema."
