= A Street to Die =

- Directed by: Bill Bennett
- Written by: Bill Bennett
- Produced by: Bill Bennett
- Starring: Chris Haywood; Jennifer Cluff; Arianthe Galani
- Cinematography: Geoff Burton
- Edited by: Denise Hunter
- Music by: Michael Atkinson; Michael Spicer
- Production companies: Mermaid Beach Productions; Multifilms
- Distributed by: Octopus (Australia); The Other Cinema (UK)
- Release date: 3 October 1985 (Australia)
- Running time: 91 min.
- Country: Australia
- Language: English
- Budget: AU$325,000 or $340,000

A Street to Die is a 1985 Australian film directed by Bill Bennett and starring Chris Haywood, Jennifer Cluff, Arianthe Galani. It was nominated for four Australian Film Institute Awards; Haywood won the award for Best Actor in a Lead Role. At the Karlovy Vary International Film Festival, Bennett won a Crystal Globe. The film was based on a true story.

== Premise ==
Colin Turner (Chris Haywood), an Australian Vietnam War veteran, blames his recently discovered cancer on exposure to Agent Orange, and sues the government for compensation, as well as legal recognition of the defoliant’s fatal health effects.

Colin dies of lymphoma after his claim for compensation is rejected. His wife Lorraine continues the fight.

== Cast ==
- Chris Haywood as Colin Turner
- Jennifer Cluff as Lorraine Turner
- Arianthe Galani as Dr. Walsea
- Robin Ramsay as Tom
- Peter Hehir as Peter Townley
- Peter Kowitz as Craig
- Malcolm Keith as Real Estate Boss
- Joy Hruby as Maureen
- Brett Climo aa Trevor
- Don Crosby as Deputy President of Commission

== Production ==
The film was based on the story of Colin Simpson, a Vietnam veteran who had died while trying to claim money from the Repatriation Department. He believed his illness was caused by Agent Orange. Simpson lived in a street in Whalen, a suburb in Western Sydney, where a number of people had health issues. All the sufferers were Vietnam veterans or children of Vietnam veterans brought together on the street by the Housing Commission.

Bill Bennett read about the story in a 1981 article in the Weekend Australian while working as a TV documentary maker. Bennett recalled "I was astonished by this story and was expecting a series of follow-ups, but I looked through all the papers and there were no follow-ups at all. I thought, `This is crazy. This is a great story and it should be out there'. So I contacted the people and got a researcher to spend a few weeks in the street, to check it out, really, before I committed to it."

He pitched it to Peter Luck to be made for The Australians but Luck declined. Bennett then decided to turn it into a dramatic feature. He raised the money himself, focusing on private investors north of Mackay in Queensland, because he heard sugar farmers had done well that year with sugar prices. He eventually raised $350,000.

The script was heavily based on fact - Bennett says it was hardly fictionalised at all. Colin Simpson's widow was heavily involved in the research and writing. "She gave her stamp of approval before we went into production, so it was pretty accurate," said Bennett.

Bennett says he did not really consider the movie an anti-war statement:

I really saw it as being about the blindness of authorities to accept culpability. To that extent, I suppose, it is an anti-war film, but it was more to do with anti-bureaucracy and a very, very strong sense of injustice, that ultimately what was at work here was the possibility that, if a precedent was established, then huge amounts of money would have to be paid out.

The film was shot primarily in the suburbs of Western Sydney and in the Whalan street where Simpson and his family had lived. Simpson’s real house (in which the widowed Mrs Simpson was still residing) was used for exterior shots while an adjacent home was used for interior scenes. The family who owned the property were paid to temporarily vacate the premises for the duration of the shoot, which took four weeks.

Bennett's wife Jennifer played Judy Simpson. Bennett recalled, "When I think back on it now, I really didn’t know first thing about filmmaking – I did it all on instinct."

== Release ==
The film was widely screened at festivals and achieved reasonable success at cinemas. It launched Bennett's career as a director. He says the investors got their money back.

The film was released in the UK in 1987. Sight and Sound called it a "judiciously understated docudrama: with "accomplished performances, especially by Chris Haywood."

== Notes ==
- Murray, Scott (1994). Australian Cinema. St.Leonards, NSW: Allen & Unwin/AFC. p. 297. ISBN 1-86373-311-6.
