= Kiss or Kill (1997 film) =

- Theatrical release poster
- Directed by: Bill Bennett
- Written by: Bill Bennett
- Produced by: Bill Bennett
- Starring: Frances O'Connor; Matt Day
- Cinematography: Malcolm McCulloch
- Edited by: Henry Dangar
- Distributed by: New Vision Films
- Release date: 11 September 1997
- Running time: 96 minutes
- Country: Australia
- Language: English
- Box office: A$929,021 (Australia)

Kiss or Kill is a 1997 Australian thriller film about two lovers and fugitives from the law who are pursued across the Australian Outback. The film was written and directed by Bill Bennett, and stars Frances O'Connor and Matt Day.

"After a robbery scam that goes bad, lovers Nikki and Al take off into the Australian outback, pursued by the police and a malevolent footballer named Zipper Doyle, and meet a number of offbeat characters." (Cover notes, DVD release)

== Plot summary ==
A woman off-camera explains how she has difficulty trusting people, especially men, because of things she saw when she was young. This comment introduces a prologue in which a little girl watches helplessly as a man (Syd Brisbane), presumably her father, appears at the door, douses her mother with petrol, and sets her alight.

The young girl, now a woman in her twenties, is Nikki Davies (Frances O'Connor). Nikki and her boyfriend, Al Fletcher (Matt Day), are small-time criminals who target married businessmen. Nikki picks up a charmless patent attorney in a bar and accompanies him back to his room where she slips something in his drink. The man passes out, Nikki lets Al into the room and they begin casing it for valuables.

Then things start to go wrong. Al discovers their mark is not merely unconscious but dead. They flee the scene but back at their place, the situation gets more complicated. A video in the patent attorney's briefcase features a famous ex-footballer, Zipper Doyle, engaged in pedophilia. Enraged, Nikki leaves an abusive message on the answering machine at Doyle's gym. Meanwhile, Al fast-forwards to the next scene in the video. Doyle is with a woman who looks disconcertingly similar to Nikki.

At the break of day, the lovers depart Adelaide, setting out across the Nullarbor Plain for Perth. Soon they are being pursued by Doyle - who wants his tape back - as well as the police. That night they stop at a motel in the middle of nowhere, run by a lonely eccentric by the name of Stan (Max Cullen). Stan's attempts at hospitality backfire when Nikki's shirt catches alight over a dinner of fondue. This incident and a sleepwalking episode later that night not only underscore the lovers' precarious situation but also serve as reminders of Nikki's horrible past.

At a truck stop the next morning, Nikki overhears that Stan has been murdered. She demands to see Al's wallet and finds it stuffed full of cash. Al insists he only robbed Stan. Back on the road, the couple becomes aware that they are being followed. Al realises it's Zipper Doyle and veers off-road. Doyle fires at them and chases after in pursuit. Fortunately for Nikki and Al, Doyle's Jaguar can't manage the territory their 4WD can.

Pulling over to get their bearings, they make a bizarre discovery. Adler Jones (Barry Otto) has been hiding in the boot. While Al is on the verge of attacking Adler, Nikki is persuaded by Adler's offer of help. Adler suggests the couple stay at his place nearby (amusingly located in a former nuclear testing site). When they arrive and meet Adler's wife Bel (Jennifer Cluff), Al acknowledges the apparent wisdom of Nikki's instinct to trust Adler.

The next morning Nikki discovers Adler and Bel dead in their beds, their throats cut. Al appears and knocks Nikki out. Evidently, he has decided Nikki must be committing the murders - only semi-consciously in her sleep - and ties her up at a safe house. It is here that the police finally catch up with the couple. However, after a night in a cell, a strange lawyer turns up and organises bail. He drives the bemused lovers to a motel where he instructs them to wait. Suddenly Zipper Doyle appears and forces them at gun-point to get into his car.

By now the police have discovered Doyle's participation in a pedophilia ring and are pursuing him as well as Nikki and Al. When Doyle sees a roadblock he begins issuing commands to Nikki who is in the driver's seat. Nikki ignores him and drives straight into the roadblock. Doyle is killed in the crash, the lovers are only wounded. In a concluding voice-over, Nikki explains who was responsible for the murders on the road and how they got off for the death of the patent attorney (always wipe your prints and only target pedophiles).

== Cast ==
- Frances O'Connor as Nikki Davies
- Matt Day as Al Fletcher
- Barry Otto as Adler Jones
- Max Cullen as Stan
- Jennifer Cluff as Bel Jones
- Barry Langrishe as Zipper Doyle
- Syd Brisbane as Nikki's Fathet

== Production ==
Bill Bennett originally got the idea to make the film while shooting Backlash at Broken Hill. He was talking with a crew member who started sharpening a Rambo knife and joked that he could easily kill Bennett and no one would ever know. The encounter unsettled Bennett and inspired him to write a story about a relationship where you did not completely know the other person. He worked on this 18 or 20 times over the next ten years but could never get the story right. Then he wrote it in three weeks and was satisfied.

Bennett decided to make the film after an unhappy experience on his first Hollywood movie Two If By Sea. He devised the movie to be low budget and was willing to make it with his own money but secured finance from Newvision Films and Film Australia. Like several of Bennett's previous movies, there was not a traditional script, but a detailed screen treatment, with the dialogue created with actor's input.

== Music ==
There is no music at any point throughout the film. The credits roll by silently, and even the DVD menu uses only ambient sound. Thanks to the frequent jump cuts, the lack of music is rarely even noticeable. The silence in the movie was used by Bennett to emphasize the tense nature of uncomfortable situations.

== Genre ==
Kiss or Kill was described as a film noir. However, Kiss or Kill is often referred to as a thriller, due to the film's unique presentation and regular use of red herrings to trick the audience. The film is an outback road movie, like many released around the same time, and takes place on the outback roads of rural Australia.

Through the main characters, the film also takes on a less clichéd lovers-on-the-run aspect. Rather than the usual setup of rebels running from oppression, the movie portrays the detectives chasing them as clever jokers. Al and Nikki are often shown to be flawed, overemotional people. Throughout the movie, there are also traces of black humour, usually shown by the detectives.

== Release ==
=== Box office ===
Kiss or Kill grossed $929,021 at the box office in Australia.

The film sold widely throughout the world.

== Critical reception ==
Kiss or Kill holds an 84% approval rating on Rotten Tomatoes based on 31 reviews. It received two thumbs up on the November 15, 1997 episode of Siskel and Ebert, with Roger Ebert praising the realism of Australian actors compared to 1990s American actors. The San Francisco Chronicle described it as a hard-hitting, effective piece of cinema. James Berardinelli criticized what he regarded as a clichéd plot line and tacky editing. Urban Cinephile wrote, "Matt Day's good looks belie a certain undercurrent which he uses to full effect in his character of Al." A January 1998 SFGate article included it on a list of the best films of 1997, which was based on the ratings of 40 major American critics.

A favourite scene for many reviewers was the comedic scene between the two detectives, nicknamed the "bacon scene". This scene takes place at a roadside diner, as the detectives have a conversation about how the younger of the two, Crean, doesn't eat bacon. James Berardinelli stated in his review of the film, the scene begins similar to something from Pulp Fiction, with the conversation being borderline hysterical. David O’Connell described the scene as having a classic, wordless punchline which is worth the wait. This scene was also the only scene with fully written dialogue in the film.

=== Awards ===
At the 1997, AFI Awards, Kiss or Kill won five out of a nominated eleven awards, including Best Film, Best Achievement in Editing, Best Achievement in Direction, Best Achievement in Sound and Best Performance by an Actor in a Supporting Role (Andrew S. Gilbert). It was also nominated for the Gold Hugo Best Film Award of 1997 at the Chicago International Film Festival. Frances O'Connor won Best Actress at the 1997 Montreal World Film Festival along with Wayne Peashley for Best Artistic Contribution in relation to sound. The film was also nominated for the Grand Prix des Amériques. In 1998, the film received recognition at the Film Critics Circle of Australia awards, winning five out of a possible eight nominated awards including best film.

Year	Award Ceremony	Category	Recipients and nominees	Result
1997	Australian Film Institute Awards	Best Achievement in Direction	Bill Bennett	Won
1997	Australian Film Institute Awards	Best Achievement in Editing	Henry Dangar	Won
1997	Australian Film Institute Awards	Best Achievement in Sound	Wayne Pashley, Toivo Lember and Gethin Creagh	Won
1997	Australian Film Institute Awards	Best Film	Bill Bennett, Jennifer Cluff and Corrie Soeterboek (co-producer)	Won
1997	Australian Film Institute Awards	Best Performance by an Actor in a Supporting Role	Andrew S. Gilbert	Won
1997	Australian Film Institute Awards	Best Achievement in Cinematography	Malcolm McCulloch	Nominated
1997	Australian Film Institute Awards	Best Achievement in Costume Design	Ruth De la Lande	Nominated
1997	Australian Film Institute Awards	Best Original Screenplay	Bill Bennett	Nominated
1997	Australian Film Institute Awards	Best Performance by an Actor in a Leading Role	Matt Day	Nominated
1997	Australian Film Institute Awards	Best Performance by an Actor in a Supporting Role	Chris Haywood	Nominated
1997	Australian Film Institute Awards	Best Performance by an Actress in a Leading Role	Frances O'Connor	Nominated
1997	Montréal World Film Festival	Best actress	Frances O'Connor	Won
1997	Montréal World Film Festival	Best Artistic Contribution	Wayne Pashley (sound)	Won
1997	Montréal World Film Festival	Grand Prix des Amériques	Bill Bennett	Nominated
1997	Chicago International Film Festival	Best Film	Bill Bennett	Nominated
1998	FCCA Awards	Best Actor (Female)	Frances O'Connor	Won
1998	FCCA Awards	Best Director	Bill Bennett	Won
1998	FCCA Awards	Best Film	Kiss or Kill	Won
1998	FCCA Awards	Best Supporting Actor (Male)	Chris Haywood	Won
1998	FCCA Awards	Best Actor (Male)	Matt Day	Nominated
1998	FCCA Awards	Best Supporting Actor (Male)	Andrew S. Gilbert	Nominated
1998	FCCA Awards	Best Cinematography	Malcolm McCulloch	Nominated

== See also ==
- Cinema of Australia
