= The Nugget =

- Directed by: Bill Bennett
- Written by: Bill Bennett
- Produced by: Jennifer Cluff-Bennett; Bill Bennett
- Starring: Eric Bana; Stephen Curry; Dave O'Neil; Belinda Emmett; Vince Colosimo
- Cinematography: Danny Ruhlmann
- Edited by: Henry Dangar
- Music by: Nigel Westlake
- Production companies: Macquarie Film Corporation; Overseas Film Group; Australian Film Financing Corp; Showtime Australia b.j. films
- Distributed by: Roadshow
- Release date: October 17, 2002
- Running time: 97 minutes
- Country: Australia
- Language: English
- Box office: $1,920,993 (Australia)

The Nugget is a 2002 Australian comedy film about three friends who find the world's largest nugget of gold.

The film was one of a number financed by the Macquarie Film Corporation.

== Storyline ==
The story concerns a group of three road workers who stumble upon the world's biggest nugget of gold, and become instant millionaires — or so they think. The road workers are mates from way back, and each weekend they go out to an old goldmining site hoping to strike it rich. Each weekend they come back with nothing but a hangover. But then everything changes when they discover the world's biggest nugget — worth many millions of dollars.

== Cast ==
- Eric Bana as Lotto
- Stephen Curry as Wookiee
- Dave O'Neil as Sue
- Belinda Emmett as Cheryl
- Peter Moon as Ratner
- Vince Colosimo as Dimitri
- Max Cullen as Wally
- Karen Pang as Moon Choo
- Sallyanne Ryan as Darlene
- Alan Brough as Jurgen
- Jeff Truman as George
- Chris Haywood as Doug
- Jean Kittson as Joyce
- Glenda Linscott as Bunny
- Jane Hall as Lucy
- Grace Tosh as Elderly Lady
- Scott McGregor as Derek McLeod
- Jennifer Cluff as Coco

== Production ==
Bill Bennett had long wanted to make a film based on the John Steinbeck story The Pearl but was unable to get the rights. Instead he decided to write a version of it set in Australia about a nugget. Bennett said the wrote it "just to have a bit of a laugh. I didn't think it would get financed. I'd been writing a lot of dark material and had a gap in my schedule so I thought it'd be nice to cleanse myself as it were. "

The film was shot in Mudgee. Eric Bana made it after Black Hawk Down.

Macquarie Film Corporation invested $2,112,800 and received $223,477 causing a write down of $1,817,800.

== Reception ==
=== Critical ===
According to Variety the film "comes off as a too-obvious giftwrap of trademarked beer-scarfin’, back-slappin’ Aussie charm for the tourist trade. Wearing “heart” on its sleeve like a sailor’s tattoo, poking at dumb-and-dumber formulae without braving full-blown Farrelly Brothers-type yocks, this slick mediocrity looks to be a mild B.O. performer at home, minor rental fare elsewhere."

=== Box office ===
The Nugget grossed $1,920,993 at the box office in Australia.

== See also ==
- Cinema of Australia
