= Seven Little Australians (TV series) =

1973 Australian television series

- Genre: Drama
- Based on: Seven Little Australians by Ethel Turner
- Written by: Eleanor Witcombe
- Directed by: Ron Way
- Country of origin: Australia
- Original language: English
- No. of episodes: 10

Production
- Executive producer: Charles Russell
- Running time: 30 minutes
- Production companies: ABC; Ethel Turner Productions; Australian Film Development Corporation

Original release
- Network: ABC
- Release: 26 August – 28 October 1973

Seven Little Australians is a ten-part Australian television series that aired on ABC Television in 1973. The mini-series was based on Ethel Turner's best-selling novel, Seven Little Australians.

The series was largely faithful to the book; differences include the fact that Judy was thin and waiflike in the book, she is more solidly built in the series. Meg's hair was long and dark, but in the book her hair is long and blonde.

== Premise ==
Captain Woolcot is a widower with six children. He marries again and he and his new wife, along with the addition of his subsequent seventh child, take on all the trials of bringing up seven spirited children.

== Cast ==
Major characters

- Barbara Llewellyn as Margaret "Meg" Woolcot
- Mark Clark as Philip "Pip" Woolcot
- Anna Hruby as Elinor "Nell" Woolcot
- Jennifer Cluff as Helen "Judy" Woolcot
- Tania Falla as Winifred "Baby" Woolcot
- Mark Shields-Brown as John "Bunty" Woolcot
- Christian Robinson as Francis Rupert Burnand Woolcot, "The General"
- Leonard Teale as Captain Woolcot
- Elizabeth Alexander as Esther Woolcot
- Ruth Cracknell as Martha

Secondary cast

- Brian James as Colonel Bryant (ep. 1, 7)
- Anne Haddy as Mrs. Bryant (ep. 1)
- Jenee Welsh as Bridget (ep. 1–5, 7, 9)
- Martin Vaughan as Pat (ep. 1–3, 7)
- Lynne Murphy as Miss Marsh (ep. 2, 5)
- Kenneth Laird as Colonel Whitmore (ep. 2)
- Stuart Finch as First Officer (ep. 2)
- Brendon Lunney as Alan Courtnay (ep. 3–4, 6, 10)
- Judy McBurney as Aldith (ep. 3–4, 10)
- Catherine Errol as Marion (ep. 3)
- June Salter as Miss Ada (ep. 3)
- Lee Denfield as Miss Flora (ep. 3)
- Alan Wilson as James Graham (ep. 3)
- James Kemsley as Andrew Courtnay (ep. 3)
- Dennis Grosvenor as Station Attendant (ep. 3)
- Redmond Phillips as Dr. Gormiston (ep. 4, 7)
- Aileen Britton as Mrs. Gormiston (ep. 4)
- Roger Cox as Dray Driver (ep. 4)
- Shirley Donald as Maid (ep. 4)
- Frank Gallacher as Postman (ep. 5, 7)
- John Morris as Chemist (ep. 6)
- Peter Gwynne as Mr. Hassal (ep. 7–10)
- Betty Dyson as Mrs. Hassal (ep. 8–9)
- Alfred Bell as Mr. Gillet (ep. 8–10)
- Steve Dodds as Tettawonga (ep. 8)
- Noel Campbell as Jacky (ep. 8)
- Marg Timbery as Cook (ep. 8)
- Bill Sceanes as Mulligan (ep. 8)
- John Armstrong as Brown (ep. 9–10)
- Nigel Lovell as The Doctor (ep. 10)
- Colin Taylor as Man (ep. 10)
- Shirley Broadway as Woman (ep. 10)
- Robert Quilter as Pastor (ep. 10)

== Production ==
The project had been in development at the ABC for a number of years. Head of television drama, John Cameron, praised the contribution of American Charles Russell in working on the script. Cameron wrote, "For the adaptation to work, Charles insisted that the story had to be built around the father and his inability to express his deep love for his children, particularly his eldest daughter."

Cameron says investment funds came in part from Global Television and Twentieth Century Fox.

Filming started 2 January 1973. It was filmed in Sydney and on location near Bowral and Canberra. Cameron also recalled "Although it [the mini series] turned out very well, there were difficulties at every turn, and at some time during the production every member of the production team,... came to me to report that we could not do it, and should abandon the project."

== Reception ==
The Sun Herald called it "the most moving, beautifully produced, sensitively acted piece of children's drama we have done on television yet." The Bulletin called it "a joy to watch".

== Overseas broadcast ==
The series was broadcast on US television as Seven Little Woolcots. It rated highly in Sweden.

== Awards ==
It won the Gold Logie in 1974 for Best New Drama. It also won several Penguin Awards and AFI Awards.

The series has been released on a 2-disc region 4 DVD set in Australia.

== Episodes ==
1. "Fowl for Dinner" - 26 August (Sydney air date)
2. "What Are Fathers For Anyway?" 2 September
3. "Consequences" - 9 September
4. "All for the Worst" - 16 September
5. "Secrets" - 23 September
6. "Tomorrow Do Thy Worst" - 30 September
7. "Into the Sun" - 7 October
8. "Yarrahappini" - 14 October
9. "The Picnic" - 21 October
10. "Going Home" (final) - 28 October
