= Macquarie Film Corporation =

The Macquarie Film Corporation was a short-lived Australian film finance company that operated from 2002 to 2006. It was an offshoot of Macquarie Bank Limited.

== Background ==
The MFC was one of only two companies licensed under the Film Licensed Investment Company Act 1998. This was a scheme proposed by David Gonski in his 1997 Review of Commonwealth Assistance to the Film Industry. Investors received 100 per cent tax concessions for buying shares in a Film Licensed Investment Company (FLIC), which, in turn, invested in qualifying Australian programs. The goal was to spread investors' risk across a slate of productions instead of single projects. The other licence was granted to Content Capital Ltd. Each company could raise up to $20 million in capital over two financial years, ending June 2000. The Federal Minister for the Arts, Peter McGauran, said that:

Both companies achieve a balance between commercial and cultural imperatives, through the people associated with the companies, and in the philosophies guiding their business plans. Content Capital's strengths lie in its film industry expertise and experience, and in its commitment to development of emerging and existing talent. Macquarie Film Corporation's strengths are in the substantial capital and corporate structure supporting the company and its portfolio approach to investment. The variation in approach, and the equal division of concessional capital between these two companies, will help in the evaluation of the scheme and provide an opportunity to assess different operating models.

Charles Wheeler, an executive director of Macquarie Bank and director of the MFC said the company expected the venture to make pre-tax returns of 20 to 25 per cent and hoped to eventually be able to finance films offshore:

We are hoping to become a major player in the finance entertainment industry in Australia and this is perhaps the start of more activity in this area.. It's a huge potential industry and there's virtually no limit to the amount of money one could invest in film, provided you have a global focus... We think there is a formula by which you can make money from film, but to do that you have to focus on commercial productions, and the more commercial they are, the better... It's the first time this idea has been tried in Australia, so to make it attractive to investors it's important there's some tax advantage. But we are hopeful that by the end of this pilot scheme we will have sufficient evidence to demonstrate ... that film is a very viable investment and they don't need the incentives.

Macquarie also created another company, Macquarie Filmed Investments, to manage MFC's investments and oversee strategy in return for a management fee.

Others on the Board were chief executive officer Bryan Lowe, Russell Leslie, Kerrie Mather, Michael McMichael, and James Mitchell, former General Manager of Beyond International. "It will be interesting to see how Macquarie Bank ... make creative decisions about the projects they will support," said one industry observer.

$22.4 million was raised under the FLICS, $16.26 million for Macquarie and $6.14 million for Content Capital. Macquarie Film Corporation Ltd was managed by Macquarie Filmed Investments Pty Ltd. Its 2000 prospectus promised returns of 25 percent over five years and a diversified portfolio.

== Films ==
The Corporation operated in conjunction with the government-financed Film Finance Corporation (FFC). If a producer had a local distribution agreement and a foreign sales agent, the FFC would commit half the budget. Macquarie Film Corporation would put up the rest.

MFC got off to a strong start with its first movie, Dirty Deeds, which was popular at the box office, followed by the even more successful Crackerjack, which grossed $8.6 million for a cost of $3.5 million.

Another attempt at raising funds was made in 2002 and 2003 using a vehicle called the Nine Macquarie Film Fund. Around $20 million was raised. This fund was able to promise at least a 50% return due to Nine's guaranteed acquisition of two television series, Young Lions ad McLeod's Daughters. It was later felt that the fund raisings were a way for Channel Nine to shift the cost of producing those series off its books and an additional slate of movies was a device to lure investors. Films financed using this fund included Getting Square, The Extra, Under the Radar, and You and Your Stupid Mate. These were distributed by Channel Nine and Hoyts, which at the time were both owned by Kerry Packer.

However, most of the subsequent movies were poorly received and did badly at the box office. Investors received a dividend of only 15 cents in the dollar. Even the most successful films proved not that profitable – Macquarie's investment in Crackerjack was $930,000, but by the end of 2004 investors had only recouped $663,000.

A number of criticisms were made of Macquarie Film Corporation, including:

- investors had equal recoupment status with the FFC, not preferential;
- poor scripts;
- an over-reliance on comedies.

Richard Harris of the Australian Directors Guild stated that, "There was an almost cynical approach to film which said that if we, you know, we get involved with these films we can find the right formula that have worked with audiences and if we put them out to market they'll work straight away."

One filmmaker said in 2006 that ""Macquarie nearly killed the film industry".

== Filmography ==
- Dirty Deeds (2002)
- The Nugget (2002)
- Crackerjack (2002)
- Horseplay (2003)
- The Wannabes (2003)
- Danny Deckchair (2003)
- Bad Eggs (2003)
- Gettin' Square (2003)
- Take Away (2003)
- Under the Radar (2004)
- The Extra (2005)
- You and Your Stupid Mate (2005)

== TV ==
- Postcard Bandit (2002) (TV movie)
- Young Lions (2002) (TV series)
- McLeod's Daughters (2002) (TV series)

=== Unmade projects ===
The following film projects were announced by Macquarie but not made:

- Hitches – an $11 million dramady directed by Fred Schepisi
- Bachelor Kisses – TV movie based on novel by Nick Earls produced by Penny Chapman
- Mondo – black comedy written by Ian David to be directed by Jonathan Teplitzky
- Mozart Maulers – comedy directed by John Polson

== Financial results ==
Returns for the Macquarie Film Corporation on investments by end of 2004:

Investment	Initial carrying cost	Write-downs	Income	Carrying value
Dirty Deeds	$2,000,000	−$1,691,000	$305,330	$3,670
The Nugget	$2,112,800	−$1,817,800	$223,477	$71,523
Horseplay	$1,100,000	−$1,100,000		$0
Crackerjack	$930,000	$0	$662,959	$267,041
Take Away	$677,803	−$677,603	$0	$0
Bad Eggs	$2,341,571	−$1,990,571	−$1,990,571	$351,000
Danny Deckchair	$3,050,000	−$3,050,000		$0
The Wannabes	$3,110,721	−$2,460,721		$650,000
