= Paradise Found (film) =

- Directed by: Mario Andreacchio
- Written by: Mario Andreacchio; Georges Campana; Frank Hübner
- Starring: Kiefer Sutherland; Nastassja Kinski; Alun Armstrong
- Cinematography: Geoffrey Simpson
- Edited by: Edward McQueen-Mason
- Music by: Frank Strangio
- Distributed by: Lionsgate Home Entertainment
- Release date: 3 March 2003
- Running time: 93 minutes
- Countries: France; Germany
- Language: English
- Box office: $4,590

Paradise Found is a 2003 biographical film based on the life of Post-Impressionist painter Paul Gauguin. Starring Kiefer Sutherland as the title character, alongside Nastassja Kinski and Alun Armstrong.

Kiefer's father, Donald Sutherland, also plays Paul Gauguin in the 1986 film The Wolf at the Door.

== Plot ==
The film covers a later part of Gauguin's life (Kiefer Sutherland) from 1880 to 1897, when he resigned his job as a stockbroker to paint full-time and journey to Polynesia. It documents how Gauguin befriended Pissarro, felt compelled to paint, abandoned his family and then chronicled his love of Tahitian life.

== Cast ==
- Kiefer Sutherland as Paul Gauguin
- Nastassja Kinski as Mette Gauguin
- Alun Armstrong as Camille Pissarro
- Thomas Heinze as Schuff
- Chris Haywood as Arnaud
- Nicholas Hope as Maurrin
- Marco Andreacchio as Juggler

== Production ==
The film was filmed in Australia and the Czech Republic.

== Box office ==
The film grossed $4,590 at the box office in Australia.
