= The Widower (2004 film) =

- Theatrical release poster
- Directed by: Kevin Lucas
- Written by: Lyndon Terracini
- Based on: Poetry of Les Murray
- Produced by: Aanya Whitehead
- Starring: Chris Haywood; Frances Rings
- Cinematography: Kim Batterham
- Edited by: Kevin Lucas
- Music by: Elena Kats-Chernin
- Release date: 2004
- Running time: 60 minutes
- Country: Australia
- Language: English

The Widower is a 2004 Australian film based on the poetry of Les Murray and directed by Kevin Lucas. It has no dialogue, instead using operatic-style music in its place. Lyndon Terracini wrote the screenplay and performed the vocals with Slava Grigoryan on guitar. The score was composed by Elena Kats-Chernin. When the film first opened, many of the screenings were accompanied by live music.

== Plot ==
A woodcutter mourns his dead wife.

== Cast ==
- Chris Haywood as Neville
- Frances Rings as Mary
- Matt Dyall as Blake
- Blake Pittman as Young Blake
- Djakapurra Munyarryun
- Jay Bailey
- Tony Barry
- Ben Harkin

== Reception ==
The Age's John Slavin writes "I don't think it has made up its mind whether it is a poetic elegy for bush life or a character study of the bushman. Haywood's superb performance emphasises the second approach." The Herald Sun gave it two stars, saying that "Director Kevin Lucas often settles for a far-too-literal interpretation of his source, which only invites the unwelcome (but not totally unwarranted) accusation that this isn't much more than a pretentiously highbrow music video." Paul Lepetit of the Daily Telegraph gave it three stars, saying "Almost contemplative at times, The Widower exercises a mesmerising effect upon its audience; for the most part, it is a delicate combination of high art and fine cinema." Reviewing in The Australian, Evan Williams gives it 3 1/2 stars sand said "The film as a whole, however -- fragmentary, impressionistic, essentially plotless -- never quite lives up to its high ambitions." Paul Byrnes of the Sydney Morning Herald finishes his review with a similar conclusion, "The film still has a power – Haywood's performance is magnificent – but it never achieves a strong inner reality. It falls short of its own tall ambitions."

== Awards ==
- 2005 AFI Awards
  - Best Adapted Screenplay - Lyndon Terracini - nominated
