= Arianthe Galani =

Australian actress

- Born: 9 April 1940 (age 86); New Zealand
- Occupations: Actress, TV commercial presenter, singer
- Years active: 1960s–present
- Known for: Prisoner; Number 96; Home Sweet Home

Arianthe Galani (born 9 April 1940), is a Greek New Zealander character actress, and commercial advertiser and former opera singer, who has worked in England and in Australia. She is known for her roles in TV soap operas and serials, TV commercials, and films, where she has primarily appeared in recurring roles, guest roles and cameos.

== Career ==
Galani started her career in opera and sang professionally before she became known as an actress. She worked as a singer in England for four years in the 1960s, then joined the Australian Opera for five years between 1967 and 1972.

Galani played a regular role in Australian soap opera, Number 96 as Maria Panucci, the aunt of Harry Michaels' character Giovanni from late 1976, until the end of the series in August 1977. She then appeared in an episode of drama series Pig in a Poke, which saw her win the 1977 Penguin Award for Best Supporting Actress for her performance.

In 1979, Galani appeared in the first series of cult drama TV series Prisoner, as Mrs. Bentley, in a controversial story-arc about a woman who had buried a child alive, a crime that was later falsely blamed on Lynn Warner (Kerry Armstrong), who was subsequently wrongly convicted and imprisoned whilst protesting her innocence. The character played a crucial role in one of the show's original storylines, and with the series gaining international success in numerous countries, it is probably Galani's most widely known role.

In 1980, Galani took a regular role as Maria Pacelli in Australian Broadcasting Corporation situation comedy series Home Sweet Home, appearing until 1982. She played Mrs Giannis in 1984 Alvin Purple comedy film sequel, Melvin, Son of Alvin, before portraying Dr Walsea opposite Chris Haywood in 1985 TV movie A Street to Die. She then played Antoinette in 1987 comedy film Dear Cardholder.

Galiani appeared in 1990 wartime miniseries Come in Spinner, alongside Rebecca Gibney and Kerry Armstrong She also took on the recurring guest role of Gina Lucini, mother of Ben Lucini (Julian McMahon) in soap opera Home and Away. Beginning in 1991, she also had a recurring guest role as Sophia Angelopoulos over several seasons of action drama series Police Rescue. She then appeared in 1993 comedy film Love in Limbo with Russell Crowe and Aden Young.

From 1994, Galani played the recurring role of Helena Hasham in Blue Heelers, with her last episode occurring in 2002. During this time, she also had a recurring guest role as Gilda Poletti in All Saints, appeared with Max Cullen in 1995 musical feature film Billy's Holiday and had a role in the 2000 Magda Szubanski TV movie Dogwoman: A Grrrl's Best Friend.

In 2015, Galani played the role of Mrs. Bashir in SBS four-part drama miniseries The Principal, alongside Alex Dimitriades and Aden Young. She went on to appear in another drama miniseries in 2019 with Lambs of God, starring Ann Dowd, Essie Davis and Sigrid Thornton.

Galani's television guest credits include Matlock Police, Homicide, The Young Doctors, A Country Practice, The Flying Doctors, Heartbreak High, Murder Call, Something in the Air, Dance Academy, Pulse, Secret City, and Amazing Grace.

Galani also featured in a series of television adverts for Jalna Greek Yoghurt and Mortein.

== Acting credits ==
=== Film ===
Year	Title	Role	Notes	Ref
1984	Melvin: Son of Alvin	Mrs. Giannis	Feature film	
1987	Dear Cardholder	Antoinette	Feature film	
1992	Resistance	Mother	Feature film	
1993	Love in Limbo (aka Touch Me, Kiss Me, Love Me or Just One Night)	Mrs. Costanides	Feature film	
1995	Billy's Holiday	Anna	Musical feature film	
1998	The Picture Woman	Woman (voice)	Short film	
1999	Threaded	Donna	Short film	
2001	Bowl Me Over	Flora	Short film	
2008	Bella	Bella's Mom	Short film	
TBA	Super Rosa	Mrs Dallas	Post-production	

=== Television ===
Year	Title	Role	Notes	Ref
1974	Matlock Police	Angela	Episode: "Dennis"	
1976	Homicide	Angela Farella	Episode: "Wrong End of the Gun"	
1976–1977	Number 96	Maria Panucci	51 episodes	
1977	Pig in a Poke		Episode: "Theo's Story"	
1979	Prisoner	Mrs. Bentley	2 episodes	
1980	The Young Doctors	Mother Superior	1 episode	
1980–1982	Home Sweet Home	Maria Pacelli	26 episodes	
1982	A Country Practice	Rhonda Shaw	Episodes: "A Sign of Affection'" Part 1 & Part 2	
1985	A Street to Die	Dr. Walsea	TV movie	
1986	The Great Bookie Robbery	Mrs. Davis	Miniseries, 1 episode	
1988	Melba	Melika	Miniseries, 2 episodes	
1988	The Flying Doctors	Connie Porter	1 episode	
1988	A Dangerous Life	Josephine Reyes	Miniseries, 2 episodes	
1990	Come in Spinner		Miniseries, 2 episodes	
1990	Home and Away	Gina Lucini	6 episodes	
1991	G.P.	Raffaella Graziano	4 episodes	
1991	A Country Practice	Bunica Enescu	Episodes: "A Brief Encounter" Part 1 and Part 2)	
1991	E Street	Maggie	1 episode	
1991–1995	Police Rescue	Sophia Angelopoulos	4 episodes	
1992	Six Pack	Anna	Anthology series, 1 episode	
1994–2002	Blue Heelers	Helena Hasham	6 episodes	
1995	Heartbreak High	Yaya	1 episode	
1999–2000	All Saints	Gilda Poletti	3 episodes	
2000	Murder Call	Antoinette de Bono	1 episode	
2000	Something in the Air	Nanny Sofia	2 episodes	
2000	Dogwoman: A Grrrl's Best Friend	Mrs. Jayasinge	TV movie	
2001	Like Mother Like Son: The Strange Story of Sante and Kenny Kimes	Beatrice	TV movie	
2002	The Angel Files	Alexandra Lucini		
2003	Marking Time	Mrs. Spiro	Miniseries	
2007	Satisfaction	Mrs. G	2 episodes	
2010	Dance Academy	Julianna	1 episode	
2015	The Principal	Mrs. Bashir	Miniseries, 2 episodes	
2017	Pulse	Chrissy Ropolous	1 episode	
2019	Secret City	Chrissy Ropolous	1 episode	
2019	Lambs of God	Abbess	Miniseries, 4 episodes	
2021	Amazing Grace	Yia Yia	1 episode	

=== Stage ===
Year	Title	Role	Notes	Ref.
1961	Tom Jones: A Comic Opera	Singer (credited as Arianthe Garland)	Hamilton Dickson Light Opera Singers	
1962	The Taming of the Shrew	(credited as Arianthe Garland)	New Theatre, Wellington	
1967	The Cage	(credited as Arianthe Garland)	Downstage Theatre, Wellington	
1968	Madama Butterfly	Kate Pinkerton (credited as Arianthe Garland)	NZ tour with New Zealand Opera Company	
1969	Iolanthe	Leila	Her Majesty's Theatre, Adelaide with J. C. Williamson's & AETT	
1971	The Marriage of Figaro	Barbarina	Australian Opera	
1972	La bohème	Musetta	Her Majesty's Theatre, Adelaide with Opera Australia & Williamson-Edgley Theatres	
1972	Cavalleria Rusticana / Pagliacci		Her Majesty's Theatre, Brisbane with Opera Australia	
1972	Rigoletto	Countess Ceprano	Opera Australia	
1976	Saturday Sunday Monday		Independent Theatre, Sydney	
1980	The Oresteia	Klytemnestra / Klytemnestra's Ghost	Nimrod Theatre, Sydney	
1985	La Cage aux Folles	Jacqueline	Her Majesty's Theatre, Sydney, Palais Theatre, Melbourne with J. C. Williamson's	
1986	The Bitter Tears of Petra von Kant		Wharf Theatre, Sydney with STC	
1989	Salome		Crossroads Theatre, Sydney with Pasolini Playhouse	
1991	Phaedra	Oenome	Wharf Theatre, Sydney with STC	
1992	The Crucible	Anne Puttnaur	STC	
1994	The Gift of the Gorgon		Wharf Theatre, Sydney with STC	
1996	Medea	Nurse	Wharf Theatre, Sydney with STC	
2002	Same, Same But Different	Mature Woman	Sydney Opera House, Lyric Theatre, Brisbane with Force Majeure & Performing Lines	

=== Radio ===
Year	Title	Role	Notes	Ref.
1969	The Ring	Jane Marsham (credited as Arianthe Garland)	New Zealand Broadcasting Corporation	
