= Essington (film) =

- Written by: Thomas Keneally
- Directed by: Julian Pringle
- Starring: Chris Haywood; Hugh Keays-Byrne
- Music by: Peter Sculthorpe
- Country of origin: Australia
- Original language: English

Production
- Producer: Alan Burke
- Cinematography: Lloyd Shiels
- Running time: 103 minutes

Original release
- Network: ABC
- Release: 26 November 1974

Essington is a 1974 Australian TV film about a convict named Squires who arrives with a detachment of Royal Marines at Port Essington.

According to the Canberra Times "it is both an historical narrative and an allegorical treatment of Australian history."

== Plot ==
In the 1840s, the settlement of Port Essington is run by Governor Macarthur. The inhabitants include Macarthur's wife, Private Evans, and a convict, Bob Squires, who has good relations with the local aboriginal population.

Private Evans falls for an aboriginal woman and goes missing from the settlement.

== Cast ==
- Chris Haywood as Bob Squires
- Jacqueline Kott
- Sandra McGregor
- Wyn Roberts
- Michael Craig
- Cornelia Frances
- Melissa Jaffer
- John Hargreaves
- Ralph Cotterill
- Hugh Keays-Byrne
- Justine Saunders
- Wendy Hughes
- Steve Dodd
- Drew Forsythe

== Reception ==
Thomas Keneally won Best Script at the 1976 Logie Awards. Chis Haywood won Best Performance by an Individual Actor.

Michael Craig called it "a wonderful script; macabre, funny, tragic and optimistic, and extremely well directed by Julian Pringle."

== Music ==
The music score was written by Peter Sculthorpe with Michael Hannan and David Matthews. It was adapted from an Aboriginal melody "Djilile" (whistling-duck on a billabong) from a recording collected in northern Australia in the late 1950s. Sculthorpe further developed the music as a 15-minute, six-part piece titled "Port Essington" which was commissioned by Musica Viva Australia for the Australian Chamber Orchestra and first performed at the University of Queensland in August 1977.
