= The Way, My Way =

2024 drama film

- Directed by: Bill Bennett
- Written by: Bill Bennett
- Produced by: Bill Bennett; Jennifer Cluff
- Starring: Chris Haywood
- Cinematography: Calum Stewart
- Edited by: Rishi Shukla
- Music by: Jackson Milas
- Production company: B.J. Films
- Distributed by: Maslow Entertainment
- Release date: May 16, 2024
- Running time: 98 minutes
- Country: Australia
- Language: English

The Way, My Way is a 2024 Australian drama film directed by Bill Bennett based on Bennett's memoir. The film was a surprise hit at the Australian box office.

== Premise ==
A man walks the Camino de Santiago in Spain.

== Cast ==
- Chris Haywood as Bill
- Jennifer Cluff as Jennifer
- Laura Lakshmi as Rosa
- Pia Thunderbolt as Cristina

== Reception ==
Luke Buckmaster of The Guardian gave the film three out of five stars and wrote, "The Way, My Way is hardly riveting viewing – but its softly inquisitive, life-affirming spirit is hard to hate." Avi Offer of NYC Movie Guru wrote, "What could've turned into a tedious, maudlin and preachy film instead turns into a profound, warm and captivating journey that will nourish your heart, mind and soul."
