= Two If by Sea =

- Theatrical release poster
- Directed by: Bill Bennett
- Screenplay by: Mike Armstrong; Denis Leary
- Story by: Mike Armstrong; Denis Leary; Ann Lembeck
- Produced by: James G. Robinson
- Starring: Sandra Bullock; Denis Leary; Stephen Dillane; Yaphet Kotto; Mike Starr
- Cinematography: Andrew Lesnie
- Edited by: Bruce Green
- Music by: Nick Glennie-Smith; Paddy Moloney
- Production company: Morgan Creek Productions
- Distributed by: Warner Bros.
- Release date: January 12, 1996
- Running time: 96 minutes
- Country: United States
- Language: English
- Box office: $21 million

Two If by Sea (also known in the United Kingdom as Stolen Hearts) is a 1996 American romantic comedy film directed by Bill Bennett, and starring Sandra Bullock and Denis Leary. The screenplay, written by Leary and Mike Armstrong, is based on a story by Leary, Armstrong, and Ann Lembeck. The title of the film is a reference to the phrase "one if by land, two if by sea" associated with Paul Revere's midnight ride.

== Plot ==
Frank O'Brien, a small-time thief, and his longtime girlfriend Roz have stolen a Matisse painting and are bickering in their stolen getaway car as they casually evade a string of police cars pursuing them, which can be considered a miracle.

Told it is worth 100 thousand, they expect to make 10 thousand upon delivering it in two days. Hearing a train, they ditch the car for Amtrak, but it doesn't take long for the police to catch up. Frank and Roz jump a ferry to Rhode Island, where they are meant to deliver the painting.

Finding out a family is away through the weekend, they let themselves in. Soon afterward the neighbor Evan Marsh pops by, and Roz skillfully weaves a lie, dropping the names of the homeowner's son based on a postcard she saw. At ease, Evan invites them to a party the next evening.

That evening the couple are relaxing, and Roz finds the stolen painting featured in a book of art. Soon thereafter they argue over another job Frank's meant to do the following week, as he'd promised to start to earn a living to put an end to their unsteady lifestyle and just do that last job.

As Roz kicked Frank out of the bedroom, he wakes on the sofa to a local law enforcement officer. Todd, a neighbor, had contacted the station, reporting suspicious behaviour. The couple starts to answer, when Evan waltzes in and vouches for them.

At Evan's party, Roz is successfully trying to blend, while an uncomfortable Frank tags along. He had been trying to dissuade her from going, mistrustful of Evan, and uncomfortable with the high society types there. Tired of Frank spoiling Roz's attempt to interact, she stomps away from the party. She tells him she needs to move on, as their relationship is not advancing as she needs.

The next day, Roz tries out painting, as well as spends the day with Evan. They ride horses and he openly expresses his interest. Meanwhile, Todd shows Frank his footage of various neighbors. He brags that he has grabbed lots of great shots he could use as blackmail.

On sunday morning, while Roz is spending time with Evan he kisses her, making her uncomfortable. Meanwhile, Frank realises that he's seen footage from Evan's of another missing Matisse in his house, realising he is an art thief.

When the FBI swarm in to bust the couple for the Matisse, Frank leads them to Evan's, where several extremely valuable paintings are found. Roz and Frank make up after he promises to clean up his act and settle down.

== Cast ==
- Sandra Bullock as Roz
- Denis Leary as Francis "Frank" O'Brien
- Stephen Dillane as Evan Marsh
- Yaphet Kotto as FBI Agent O'Malley
- Mike Starr as "Fitzie"
- Jonathan Tucker as Todd
- Wayne Robson as Beano Callahan
- Michael Badalucco as Quinn
- Lenny Clarke as Kelly

== Production ==
Bennett later recalled the script really appealed to him because “it was ultimately about the core relationship between Sandra Bullock and the Denis Leary character, and about this man's dinosaur approach to relationships, the fact that he regarded his role as a male as providing an income - and that's basically where it ended. Because he did provide an income that allowed him then to virtually ignore his partner."

The film was shot in locales including Chester, Lunenburg, Mahone Bay, and Riverport, Nova Scotia.

== Release ==
=== Box office ===
Two If by Sea opened theatrically on January 12, 1996 in 1,712 venues, grossing $4,656,986 in the United States and Canada, ranking tenth for its opening weekend. At the end of its run, the film grossed $10,658,278 in the United States and Canada and an estimated $10 million internationally for a worldwide total of $21 million.

The film was Sandra Bullock's worst wide opening up until 2015, when Our Brand Is Crisis released in October, earning $3,238,433 in its first weekend.

=== Critical reception ===
The film received negative reviews from critics. On Rotten Tomatoes the film has an approval rating of 13% based on reviews from 30 critics, with an average rating of 3.9/10.

Variety wrote: "It could have been a recipe for antic fun, but the couple’s quarrelsome nature is grating, the cops are needlessly inept, the boy provides a misplaced element of creaky sentimentality, and the goons debase the hallowed cinema ground of petty crime." Entertainment Weekly gave it a D.

Denis Leary said it was "one of the funniest scripts he had ever read" and blamed director Bill Bennett for the film's failure, saying "he destroyed it."
