= In a Savage Land =

- Directed by: Bill Bennett
- Written by: Bill Bennett; Jennifer Cluff
- Produced by: Bill Bennett; Jennifer Cluff
- Starring: Rufus Sewell; Martin Donovan; Maya Stange
- Cinematography: Danny Ruhlmann
- Production companies: Australian Film Finance Corp. Hollywood Partners; Showtime Australia; Strand/New Oz Prods; Polygram Filmed Entertainment
- Distributed by: Motion International (Canada)
- Release date: 21 October 1999
- Running time: 112 minutes
- Country: Australia
- Language: English
- Budget: A$12 million
- Box office: A$314,549 (Australia)

In a Savage Land is a 1999 Australian film set in New Guinea just prior to and during World War II. It won the 2000 ARIA Music Award for Best Original Soundtrack.

== Story ==
The film opens in pre-1938 Adelaide, where Phillip Spence (Donovan) is lecturing a graduate class in anthropology. He hopes to enlarge on the work of Malinowski with a multi-year field study of a Trobriand Island community, whose matrilineal culture encourages pre-marital sex. He needs his star student Evelyn, who has a gift for languages, to accompany him and asks her to marry him — despite his gauche approach she acquiesces. They hear on the radio of the declaration of war with Germany.

They reach the island, where traders exchange trinkets (a mouth organ for instance) for pearls. They are introduced to Mick Carpenter (Sewell), a free-diver who goes pearl hunting with the natives. He predicts she will not stay a year; she wagers her father's watch against one of his pearls to the contrary. Phillip has an argument with the traders, who are profiting from the natives' poor bargaining position; the trader questions whether he expects an academic promotion on the back of his research and how much he is paying his subjects. Evelyn picks a fight with the Rev. MacGregor (John Howard), who is urging them to abandon their funeral rituals for burial in the Christian cemetery, and wants the women to cover their breasts. She becomes proficient at the language, and in conversation with the women learns of their conception myth: because recreational sex is a way of life they do not see pregnancy as an occasional outcome.

She has an argument with her husband; he deprecates her ambitions as a researcher on the grounds of his academic credentials and her inferior status as a female student. He refuses her permission to use the camera, as she "might break it". And he tells her to stop talking to the women, being a departure from accepted research methodology.

She does take the camera, and captures a couple copulating in a hidden grotto; she returns the camera to her furious husband; "see I didn't break it" she pouts. But the photograph is stolen and creates a crisis — it turns out the girl was promised to a prominent tribesman; now he doesn't want her. The girl leaps to her death from a tall coconut tree; the traditional form of suicide. Evelyn is distraught, seeing herself as a impediment to her husband's work, and pays Carpenter to take her to a neighbouring island to conduct her own research among the island's inhabitants, a belligerent patriarchal tribe who show her no respect once Carpenter has left. Her husband has an unhappy time with her gone: he is assaulted by the woman, humiliated and ostracized. Evelyn is called back as he is dying from dysentery. She buries him native fashion; she removes her clothing and goes through the widow's ritual: her head is shaved, she is blackened all over with mud and shuts herself in a cage, preparing to starve herself to death. Carpenter brings her water and tries to feed and exercise her. Weeks pass and she leaves the cage; Carpenter nurses her back to health and they fall in love.

They hear on the radio of the attack on Pearl Harbor and are warned of imminent Japanese encroachment. Japanese bombers shower them with leaflets, then a small party of Japanese soldiers lands, and the Europeans follow the pre-arranged moonlight evacuation. Carpenter makes as if to leave, then doubles back to remain as a coast watcher — executed as a spy if caught.

It is around 1950. Evelyn had made a pilgrimage to the island, retrieved her notebooks, and asked after Carpenter, but heard only rumours of his death. Her book In a Savage Land is published, and at a book signing someone slips a package onto the table. It contains Carpenter's perfect pearl — she rushes out and eventually finds him, one leg missing but alive. The film ends with a flashback to the idyllic moment when he told her of the legend that a gold-lipped oyster predicted a lasting relationship.

== Cast ==
- Rufus Sewell as Mick Carpenter
- Martin Donovan as Phillip Spence
- Maya Stange as Evelyn
- John Howard as Rev. MacGregor
- Marshall Napier as Geoffrey Hallerton
- Andrew S. Gilbert as Gerry
- Edwin Hodgeman as Publicist

== Production ==
The idea behind the film originated in some photographs Bennett found in a trunk left by his father, who was an Australian war photographer in the area in the 1940s. He read the work of Bronislaw Malinowski in the Trobriand Islands and imagined his protagonists building on his work. The story was written by Bennett and his wife Jennifer; Dr Wojciech Dabrowski advised on anthropological aspects of the story and Neil McDonald and Hank Nelson of ANU helped with historical research.

Bennett later said the film "was about taking a conventional marriage and putting it into an environment where those conventions weren’t in any way respected or adhered to. In the same way that road movies like putting people in a car and then applying the heat – that was the case with In a Savage Land."

Bennett decided to shoot the film on location on the Trobriands, using hundreds of locals as extras, which lent it near-documentary authenticity but at great expense. With a budget of around $10 million, it was in 1999 the most expensive Australian film to date.

The film was shot over six weeks in Papua New Guinea and two weeks in Adelaide.

"I don't know if it's mainstream," said Bennett of the film. "It's a thinking person's film. But look at Dr Zhivago, Lawrence of Arabia or The Piano – they're all thinking person's films."

== Reception ==
Variety called it "an old-fashioned turkey that feels small despite the breadth of the story attempted. No thesps stand out in the middling ensemble job, the sexual politics are old hat, and even pretty pictures of the Trobriand Islands aren't memorable."

Film critic David Stratton on SBS's The Movie Show called the film "visually breathtaking" and felt "the first 2/3rds of the film are gripping, if at times a bit downbeat" but "the love story fails to soar; it comes too late in the film, and it's too uninvolving." His co-host Margaret Pomeranz said: "A Savage Land has an extraordinary texture simply because Bill Bennett has taken the trouble to shoot this on location in the Trobriands. It's fascinating." She went on to say: "But I don't think that the film ultimately delivers a satisfactory contemporary context." She praised the performances of Maya Stange, Martin Donovan and Rufus Sewell, and added: "But the other star of the film is cinematographer Danny Ruhlmann who's an award-winning commercials photographer, this is his first feature and it looks stunning."

== Notes ==
- Urban, Andrew L. (June 1999). "In a Savage Land". Cinema Papers. p. 18-19,56.
