= Chris Haywood =

Australian actor

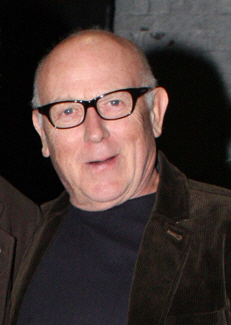
- Haywood in July 2012
- Born: Chris Haywood c. 1948; Billericay, Essex, England
- Education: East 15 Acting School
- Years active: 1972–present
- Spouse(s): Dr Gillian Deakin; Aireen Diego
- Partner: Wendy Hughes
- Children: 5

Chris Haywood (born c. 1948) is an English-born Australian actor, writer, and producer, with close to 500 screen performances to his name. He has also worked as a casting director, art director, sound recordist, camera operator, gaffer, grip, and location and unit manager.

== Early life and education ==
Haywood was born around 1948 in Billericay, Essex, England. He spent his early childhood in Chelmsford before moving to High Wycombe in Buckinghamshire, where he attended Royal Grammar School from 1959 to 1965, on a scholarship. His early acting experience at school was in a production of The Mikado, but after his first year there, his academic record declined (which Haywood has since attributed to ADD, which was not diagnosed until adulthood). As a youth he was a navy cadet, and at the age of 15, he worked in frigate fisheries protection patrol in the Northern Sea. While living in High Wycombe, he also served as chairman of the Young Liberals for three years.

Haywood then started working in the cellars of a local wine shipper in London, before gaining a place at E15 Acting School, for which he sourced a grant from his local county council to cover his tuition fees. Soon after graduating, Haywood emigrated to Sydney, Australia as a 'Ten Pound Pom' in November 1970, upon the suggestion of Australian theatre director Richard Wherrett (was a tutor at E15 at the time, in 1969) and Australian production designer Larry Eastwood (then, a student at the school).

Upon his arrival in Australia, Haywood met several other aspiring young actors, including Wendy Hughes and John Hargreaves, before taking a job as a surveyor’s assistant for the Eastern Suburbs railway, while attending theatre auditions.

== Career ==
Soon after arriving in Sydney, Haywood undertook work as an extra for Film Australia and understudied roles for Sydney theatre companies including the Old Tote. He also worked on the railways and then drove trucks, while playing an instrumental part in the inception of the Nimrod Theatre Company, helping to build the premises with scrap timber. He then began landing roles in drama series at the ABC, including Certain Women and Crawford Productions police procedural series, including Homicide and Matlock Police, while performing on stage in plays at night.

Haywood landed his first major film role in 1974, portraying a psychiatric nurse in director Peter Weir’s debut feature The Cars That Ate Paris. That same year, he also appeared in ABC telemovie Essington, which saw him win a 1976 Logie Award for Best Individual Performance by an Actor. He had roles in several more films in including football comedy The Great Macarthy drama film The Removalists The Trespassers (1976) and action film Deathcheaters He also had a recurring role in Alvin Purple, the comedy series sequel to the 1973 film of the same name, playing Rod 'Spike' Morley.

Haywood then scored his breakthrough role in Phillip Noyce's 1978 film Newsfront, playing assistant cameraman, Chris Hewitt, alongside Bill Hunter. George Miller had offered Haywood the role of Jim Goose in Mad Max, but opting to star in Newsfront, the role went to Steve Bisley instead. His performance in Newsfront earned him a nomination for earned him an Australian Film Institute Award for Best Supporting Actor. That same year, he appeared in A Good Thing Going, which subsequently won him a Logie Award for Best Supporting Actor in 1980. He also had a role in In Search of Anna with Newsfront co-star Bill Hunter.

Haywood became artistic director of the Pros and Cons Playhouse at Parramatta Gaol from 1979 to 1981, and established the drama service on Kiribati National Radio.

In a move that was instrumental in shaping his ongoing career, Wendy Hughes introduced Haywood to filmmaker Paul Cox, who cast him opposite Hughes in his 1979 film Kostas. This was the beginning of a partnership which saw Haywood work on both sides of the camera on many of Cox's films. Haywood next appeared opposite an all-star cast of Edward Woodward, Jack Thompson, John Waters, Bryan Brown and Charles Tingwell in Bruce Beresford's 1980 war epic Breaker Morant. He also reunited with Bill Hunter again in Maybe This Time, before joining Mel Gibson and Sam Neill to shoot World War II film Attack Force Z the following year.

Haywood went on to play Curly, opposite Kirk Douglas, Sigrid Thornton and Tom Burlinson in George Miller's 1982 classic western period drama, The Man from Snowy River. Based on Banjo Paterson's poem of the same name, it became the most successful film in Australia, until Crocodile Dundee was released three years later. That same year, he reunited with director Phillip Noyce for his 1982 film Heatwave, playing developer Peter Houseman. He also appeared in Freedom with Jon Blake, action thriller Running on Empty, comedy film The Clinic and Paul Cox's Lonely Hearts, alongside Wendy Hughes in the latter.

Haywood next appeared in the lead role of Scottish immigrant Wattie Doig in 1983 Richard Lowenstein film Strikebound, which saw him nominated for the 1984 Australian Film Institute Award for Best Lead Actor. His other film appearances that year includes superhero movie The Return of Captain Invincible with Alan Arkin and Christopher Lee, With Prejudice and Man of Flowers, while on television he had a role in drama miniseries Return to Eden. The following year saw him in Ozploitation cult horror film Razorback and drama miniseries Waterfront.

In 1985, Haywood appeared in several films, landing the lead role of Cole Turner in Bill Bennett film A Street to Die, as a returned soldier suing for damages over chemical exposure in Vietnam. His performance saw him nominated again for the AFI Best Actor Award, winning this time. He had a role in drama film Burke & Wills, the true story of the titular explorers on their doomed journey across Australia. That same year, he also appeared in Wills & Burke, a black comedy spoof film about the same pair, which featured Nicole Kidman in an early role. He also featured opposite Eric Roberts in The Coca-Cola Kid.

Haywood worked with director Richard Lowenstein once more on 1986 film Dogs in Space, appearing opposite the late INXS frontman Michael Hutchence. That same year, he played opposite Colin Friels in comedy film Malcolm and co-starred in Double Sculls with John Hargreaves, He was also part of the ensemble cast for miniseries Cyclone Tracy, based on the devastation wreaked on Darwin on Christmas Eve in 1974.

Haywood then played the lead role of Henry Rose in 1987 film The Tale of Ruby Rose and reunited with both Wendy Hughes and Colin Friels in Warm Nights on a Slow Moving Train. He also featured opposite Nicole Kidman in The Bit Part, reuniting with her again a year later in Emerald City, in a role that earned him the 1989 Australian Film Institute Award for Best Supporting Actor. That same year, he was also nominated for Best Lead Actor for Island, but lost to Sam Neill for Evil Angels. From the late 1980s, Haywood appeared in a succession of Paul Cox's films, including the Greek-filmed Island (1989), Golden Braid (1990) in which he played the lead, and The Nun and the Bandit (1992) alongside Gosia Dobrowolska, after having appeared with her in A Woman's Tale a year prior.

In 1990, Haywood played the title role of 'Mr Brown' (Peter Macari) in Call Me Mr. Brown, based on the 1971 true story of the Qantas extortion scam. He also appeared opposite Tom Selleck and Alan Rickman in western film Quigley Down Under and had a main role in drama film Aya, as Mac, scoring another AFI Award nomination for the latter. The following year, he appeared opposite Bryan Brown and Karen Allen in comedy/drama film Sweet Talker. From 1991, Haywood played the ongoing role of Dennis Tontine in BBC television series Boys from the Bush.

In 1994, Haywood landed the role of Ken in comedy film Muriel's Wedding, starring Toni Collette in her breakthrough role. He also appeared opposite Aden Young and Claudia Karvan in Exile. The following year, Haywood won a Silver Logie Award for Most Outstanding Actor for his performance as series lead Michael Kidd in crime drama series Janus. In 1996, he played Sam in Scott Hicks' Shine, the true story of child piano prodigy, David Helfgott, starring Geoffrey Rush. He also appeared in comedy/drama film Lust and Revenge, alongside Wendy Hughes and Claudia Karvan.

Haywood collaborated again with Bill Bennett on his 1997 film Kiss or Kill, for which his performance as Detective Hummer won him a Film Critics Circle of Australia Award for Best Male Supporting Actor. and saw him nominated for the 1997 Australian Film Institute Award for Best Supporting Actor. He also played Detective Sergeant Wilansky in the AFI Award-nominated Blackrock. The following year, Haywood appeared in miniseries The Day of the Roses – a retelling of the 1977 Granville rail disaster. He then featured alongside David Wenham, Sam Neill and Aden Young in Molokai: The Story of Father Damien, the 1999 AFI Award-nominated film of the true account of the nineteenth century priest who volunteered to go to the island of Moloka'i, to care for lepers.

Haywood won the 2000 Australian Film Institute Award for Best Guest Actor in a Drama Series for "Men in the Dark", an episode of Stingers. That same year, he appeared in several films, including the Paul Cox-written and directed romance drama Innocence, thriller The Monkey's Mask and comedy/drama films Muggers and Change of Heart.

Between 2000 and 2003, Haywood played the ongoing role of George Hasnakov in television series Grass Roots and during this time, had a recurring guest role in Mcleod's Daughters. In 2001, he reunited once more with director Bill Bennett for comedy film The Nugget, starring Eric Bana and Stephen Curry. That same year, he joined Charles Dance, Robert Carlyle, Ben Mendelsohn and Colin Friels in political drama Black and White. Between 2002 and 2004, Haywood had a recurring guest role in medical drama All Saints, playing Peter Buchanan. During this time, he appeared opposite Kiefer Sutherland in 2003 docudrama Paradise Found, about artist Paul Gauguin and played Twink in 2003 drama film Lennie Cahill Shoots Through.

Haywood co-starred with Jacqueline McKenzie in 2004 drama film Human Touch and had a main role in The Widower. He also appeared in crime drama BlackJack: Sweet Science, one of several TV films in which Colin Friels played the lead role of Detective Jack Kempson. The following year, Haywood appeared as Sam, alongside Ewen Leslie, in Jewboy. He then went on to secure a role in 2006 award-winning drama film Jindabyne, opposite Laura Linney and Gabriel Byrne and reunited with Colin Friels for crime film Solo the same year. He also appeared in the Jane Campion-directed 2006 short The Water Diary, which in 2008 became part of 8, an anthology film comprised of eight shorts from eight famous directors.

Haywood joined the cast of long-running soap opera Home and Away in 2007, playing the ongoing role of Bruce Campbell, the strict religious grandfather of Geoff and Annie Campbell. He then played his most significant stage role, Big Daddy, in a 2008 production of Cat on a Hot Tin Roof in Melbourne. He also appeared in period drama film The Last Confession of Alexander Pearce, with Dan Wyllie and co-starred with Wendy Hughes in The View from Greenhaven. The following year, he acted opposite Clive Owen as Tom in drama film The Boys are Back. He then featured in 2010 Jeremy Sims-directed war drama Beneath Hill 60 with Brendan Cowell and appeared with John Jarratt in 2010 suspense thriller Savages Crossing, before taking on several films in 2011 including Sleeping Beauty with Emily Browning, Palawan Fate and thriller Swerve, alongside Jason Clarke and Vince Colosimo.

In June 2013, Haywood landed a recurring guest role in long-running soap opera Neighbours as Walter Mitchell, while also landing a role alongside Matthew Lillard and Bindi Irwin in family adventure film Return to Nim's Island. In 2017, he appeared in drama film Australia Day with Bryan Brown and horror film Boar, with Bill Moseley, John Jarratt and Steve Bisley.

Haywood won Best Screen Performance at the ReelGood Film Festival for his role in 2018 short film Skewwhiff. He then won Best Male Actor at the South Australian Screen Awards for his role in 2019 short The Projectionist. In 2019, he acted alongside Garrett Hedlund, David Wenham and Kelly Macdonald in Dirt Music, Gregor Jordan's adaptation of Tim Winton's novel of the same name. The following year, he played opposite Martin Sacks in horror film Sweet River.

Most recently, Haywood played the lead role of Bill Bennett in Bennett's 2024 autobiographical drama film The Way, My Way, based on his book of the same name, in which he walks the 800km Camino de Santiago pilgrimage. He then played a corrupt cop in 2026 film Body Blow, opposite Sacha Horler.

Haywood's further television credits include Against the Wind, Five Mile Creek, Cop Shop, A Country Practice, Boys from the Bush, Water Rats, Farscape, McLeod's Daughters, Stingers, The Pacific, The Letdown, Wolf Creek Harrow and Darby and Joan.

=== Other ===
As Patron of the Friends of Waverley Group, in 2002 Haywood established an award for outstanding research-based literature, as an initiative of the Waverley Council with support from the community. It was further developed into a prestigious event by a group of local writers and literary advocates (including author and playwright Alex Buzo), and has since been renamed the Mark & Evette Moran Nib Literary Award.

== Personal life ==
After meeting actress Wendy Hughes at a party in Whale Beach, immediately after his arrival in Australia in the early 1970s, the pair worked together in the 1978 film Newsfront, and soon after, developed a romantic relationship. On 3 August 1978, the pair had a daughter, Charlotte.

In 1980, Haywood and Hughes played parents in For a Child Called Michael, an educational film about childbirth, which was shown to expecting parents at Royal Women's Hospital in Melbourne. The couple separated that same year, after which time their daughter continued to live with Hughes in the Sydney suburb of Surry Hills, with Haywood playing an active role in raising her. As an adult, daughter Charlotte went on to work as an experimental interdisciplinary artist, and is also an actor.

Haywood married Dr Gillian Deakin, with whom he had two children, Rose and Felix. He relocated to Kiribati in the Gilbert Islands with the family, after Deakin secured work there, running an aid agency. Both children followed in their mother’s career footsteps.

As of 2021, Haywood was living with wife Aireen Diego and their daughter in a converted convent in Brooklyn, overlooking the Hawkesbury River, where, since COVID-19, he has worked as a coxswain in the Australian pearling industry for Broken Bay Pearl Farm in Mooney Mooney. In 2025, he was also conducting tours of the Hawkesbury River, as Deputy Captain of VRA Hawkesbury and coxswain of their rescue boat.

Haywood was by the side of former partner, Wendy Hughes, when she died of cancer on 8 March 2014.

== Awards ==
Year	Work	Award	Category	Result	Ref
1976	Essington	Logie Award	Best Individual Male Performance	Won	
1978	Newsfront	Australian Film Institute Award	Best Actor in a Supporting Role	Nominated	
	In Search of Anna	Asian Film Festival Award		Won	
1980	A Good Thing Going	Logie Award	Best Supporting Actor	Won	
1984	Strikebound	Australian Film Institute Award	Best Actor in a Lead Role	Nominated	
1985	A Street to Die	Australian Film Institute Award	Best Actor in a Lead Role	Won	
1989	Island	Australian Film Institute Award	Best Actor in a Lead Role	Nominated	
1989	Emerald City	Australian Film Institute Award	Best Actor in a Supporting Role	Won	
1991	Aya	Australian Film Institute Award	Best Actor in a Supporting Role	Nominated	
1995	Janus	Logie Award	Silver Logie for Most Outstanding Actor	Won	
1997	Kiss or Kill	Australian Film Institute Award	Best Actor in a Supporting Role	Nominated	
1997	Kiss or Kill	Film Critics Circle of Australia Award	Best Male Supporting Actor	Won	
2000	Stingers (episode: "Men in the Dark")	Australian Film Institute Award	Best Actor in a Guest Role in a Television Drama Series	Won	
2019	Skewwhiff	ReelGood Film Festival	Best Screen Performance	Won	
2019	The Projectionist	South Australian Screen Awards	Best Male Actor	Won	

== Filmography ==
=== Television ===
Year	Title	Character	Notes	Ref
1972	The Aunty Jack Show	Gorilla / American at party	2 episodes	
1972	The Money Game	The Worker (voice)	TV play	
1972	Number 96			
1973	Frank and Francesca	Monty		
1973	Certain Women			
1974	Essington	Bob Squires	TV movie	
1974; 1975	Matlock Police	Jeff / Pete Williams	2 episodes: "The Germ Bomb", "The Contessa"	
1975	Division 4	Bogey	1 episode	
1975	The Explorers	King	Episode: "Burke and Wills"	
1975	You Ain't Got a Barrel of Money		TV pilot	
1975	Target	Richard Pollard		
1975	Quality of Mercy	Kurt	Miniseries, episode: "Send Him on His Way Rejoicing"	
1975	Shannon's Mob	Richard Pollard	Episode: "Mixed Doubles"	
1975	Ivanhoe	Voice	Animated TV movie	
1975	Kazzam International		Short film	
1976	Luke's Kingdom	Arthur Cope	Miniseries, episode 4: "The Man From Home"	
1976	The Sullivans			
1976	Homicide	Greg Ferguson	Episode: "Third Generation"	
1976	Rush	Crew	Episode: "La Belle France"	
1976	Alvin Purple	Rod 'Spike' Morley	13 episodes	
1977	Bluey	Chris	Episode: "The Wrong Coffin"	
1978	A Good Thing Going	Terry	TV movie	
1978–1981	Cop Shop	Various characters	9 episodes	
1979	Glenview High	Blue	Episode "Easy Money"	
1979	Against the Wind	John Leary	Miniseries, episode: "The Tree of Liberty"	
1979	Patrol Boat	Parkes	Episode: "Follow the Leader"	
1979	Jokes	Various characters		
1980	The Timeless Land	Johnny	Miniseries	
1981	Women of the Sun	Alf	Miniseries, episode: "Maydina the Shadow"	
1981	Holiday Island	Cosmos	Episode: "Mother's Revenge"	
1982	A Country Practice	Duke (Wayne)	2 episodes	
1983	Return to Eden	Jason Peebles	2 episodes	
1984	Five Mile Creek	McRea	Episode: "Home and Away"	
1984	Carson's Law	Frank White	1 episode	
1984	The Explorers	King	1 episode	
1984	Waterfront	Ernie	Miniseries	
1984	The Great Gold Swindle	Peter Duvnjak	TV movie	
1984	Rafferty's Rules	Michael Rafferty	Original pilot (unaired)	
1985	Double Sculls	Paul Weber	TV movie	
1986	Cyclone Tracy	Steve	Miniseries	
1986	King Solomon's Mines	Voice	Animated TV movie	
1986	The Cutting Room	Warren	Episode: "Out of It"	
1987	Don Quixote of La Mancha	Voice	Animated TV movie	
1987	Frontier	Ward Stephen	Miniseries	
1991–1992	Boys from the Bush	Dennis Tontine	19 episodes	
1992	The Last Man Hanged	Sheriff	TV movie	
1993	G.P.	Jack Molineaux	Episode: "One Perfect Day"	
1994–1995	Janus	Michael Kidd	24 episodes	
1995	Asian Connection: Old Flames (aka Singapore Sling: Old Flames)	Sonny	TV movie	
1995	Fire	Detective Ron Chandler	Episode: "Glory Days"	
1996	Snowy River: The McGregor Saga	Morell	Season 4, 2 episodes	
1996	Pacific Drive	Bill Garland		
1996	Naked: Stories of Men	Bish	Episode: "Fisherman's Wake"	
1996	Sun on the Stubble	Conductor del Tren	Miniseries	
1996	Water Rats	Peter Anderson	Episode: "Wrecked"	
1996	The Feds	Daniel 'Mac' MacIntyre		
1996–1998	House Gang	Mike Wilson	Seasons 1-2	
1997	Murder Call	Jack Telfer	Episode: "Hot Shot"	
1997	One Way Ticket	Bertie	TV movie	
1998	Good Guys Bad Guys	Frank Conroy	Episode: "You Say Etics, I Say Ethics"	
1998	The Day of the Roses	Informant	Miniseries	
1999	Wildside	Jim Summers	Season 2, episode 17	
1999; 2000	Farscape	Maldis	2 episodes	
2000–2003	Grass Roots	George Hasnakov	18 episodes	
2001	Mcleod's Daughters	Bob	Season 1, 3 episodes	
2001	My Husband, My Killer	George Cannellis	TV movie	
2001–2002	BackBerner	Stanley Trundle / Labor MP Michael Thompson	4 episodes	
2002–2004; 2009	All Saints	Peter Buchanan / Neil	12 episodes	
2003	Fat Cow Motel	Rey Roy	Episode #1.9	
2004	Salem's Lot	Uncredited	Miniseries	
2004	Through My Eyes	Des Sturgess Q.C.	Miniseries	
2004	Stingers	Stevey Dawes	Episode: "Brave New World"	
2004	BlackJack: Sweet Science	Wayne Tippet	TV movie	
2006	Nightmares & Dreamscapes: From the Stories of Stephen King	Dr. Bogner	Episode: "The Road Virus Heads North"	
2007	The Starter Wife	Mr. Lewis	Episode: "Hour 1"	
2007	Home and Away	Bruce Campbell	31 episodes	
2009	My Place	Mr. O'Sullivan	2 episodes	
2009	False Witness	Browning	TV movie	
2010	The Pacific	John Leckie	Miniseries, 2 episodes	
2010–2018	Rake	Judge / Judge Beinworth / Prosecution	4 episodes	
2012	Dangerous Remedy	Sir Arthur Rylah	TV movie	
2013	Top of the Lake	Jock	Miniseries, Episode 2	
2013	Neighbours	Walter Mitchell / Dave	10 episodes	
2013	Redfern Now	Doctor	Episode: "Dogs of War"	
2016	Black Comedy	Elenco Invitado	Season 2, episode 5	
2016	Secret City	Lloyd Rankin	Season 1, 2 episodes	
2017	The Letdown	Gene	2 episodes	
2017	Wolf Creek	Tom	Episode: "Journey"	
2018	Harrow	Connelly	1 episode	
2018	Reef Break	Australian Diplomat	1 episode	
2023	The Messenger	Dr Nadel	3 episodes	
2025	Darby and Joan	Shane Cozens	1 episode	

=== Film ===
Year	Title	Character	Notes	Ref
1974	The Cars That Ate Paris aka The Cars That Eat People)	Darryl	Feature film	
1975	The Great Macarthy	Warburton	Feature film	
1975	The Removalists	Rob	Feature film	
1976	The Trespassers	Sandy	Feature film	
1976	Deathcheaters	Carnicero	Feature film	
1977	Out of It	Warren	Feature film	
1978	Newsfront	Chris Hewitt	Feature film	
1978	In Search of Anna	Jerry	Feature film	
1979	Kostas	Martin	Feature film	
1980	Dead Man's Float (aka Smugglers Cove)	Thug	Feature film	
1980	Breaker Morant	Corporal Sharp	Feature film	
1981	Maybe This Time	The Salesman	Feature film	
1981	Wrong Side of the Road	Country policeman	Feature film	
1982	Freedom	Phil	Feature film	
1982	With Prejudice	Rogerson	Feature film	
1982	Attack Force Z	'Sparrer' Bird	Feature film	
1982	Heatwave	Peter Houseman	Feature film	
1982	The Man from Snowy River	Curly	Feature film	
1982	Running on Empty (aka Fast Lane Fever)	Photographer	Feature film	
1982	The Clinic	Dr. Eric Linden	Feature film	
1982	Lonely Hearts	Detective	Feature film	
1983	Man of Flowers	David	Feature film	
1983	The Return of Captain Invincible	Maitre D'	Feature film	
1984	Razorback	Benny Baker	Feature film	
1984	Strikebound	Wattie Doig	Feature film	
1985	The Coca-Cola Kid	Kim	Feature film	
1985	A Street to Die	Col Turner	Feature film	
1985	Burke & Wills	Tom McDonagh	Feature film	
1985	Wills & Burke	Constable	Spoof film	
1986	Malcolm	Willy	Feature film	
1986	Dogs in Space	Man	Feature film	
1987	The Tale of Ruby Rose	Henry Rose	Feature film	
1987	The Bit Part	Michael Thornton	Feature fun	
1988	The First Kangaroos	James Giltinan	Feature film	
1988	A Day and a Half		Short film	
1988	Warm Nights on a Slow Moving Train	Stationmaster	Feature film	
1988	Manifesto	Wango	Feature film	
1988	The Navigator: A Medieval Odyssey	Arno	Feature film	
1988	Emerald City	Mike McCord	Feature film	
1989	Island	Janis	Feature film	
1990	Plead Guilty, Get a Bond	Colin McKenzie	Short film	
1990	Call Me Mr. Brown	Peter Macari	Feature film	
1990	Golden Braid	Bernard	Feature film	
1990	Aya	Mac	Feature film	
1990	Quigley Down Under	Major Ashley-Pitt	Feature film	
1991	Sweet Talker	Gerald Bostock	Feature film	
1991	A Woman's Tale	Jonathan	Feature film	
1992	The Nun and the Bandit	Michael Stanley		
1992	Alex	Mr. Jack		
1993	Touch Me	Claude	Short film	
1993	My Father's House	Father	Short film	
1994	Bernie's Magic Moment	Bernie	Short film	
1994	Exile	Sacerdote	Feature film	
1994	Muriel's Wedding	Ken Blundell	Feature film	
1996	Tales of Erotica	Claude	Anthology film (Segment: Touch Me)	
1996	Cabbie of the Year	President of the Taxis Association	Short film	
1996	Shine	Sam	Feature film	
1996	Lust and Revenge	George Oliphant	Feature film	
1997	Kiss or Kill	Detective Hummer	Feature film	
1997	Blackrock	Detective Sergeant Wilansky	Feature film	
1997	Fable	Flagg	Feature film	
1997	Oscar and Lucinda	Mr. Judd	Feature film	
1999	Molokai: The Story of Father Damien	Clayton Strawn	Feature film	
1999	Accidents Will Happen		Short film	
2000	Muggers	George Roy Rogers	Feature film	
2000	Innocence	Minister	Feature film	
2000	The Monkey's Mask	Dad Fitzpatrick	Feature film	
2000	Change of Heart	Harry	Feature film	
2001	One Night the Moon	Sergeant	Short film	
2001	The Diaries of Vaslav Nijinsky	Oscar	Feature film	
2002	Black and White	Detective Sergeant Karskens	Feature film	
2002	The Nugget	Doug	Feature film	
2002	Stuffed Bunny	Father of Marcus	Short film	
2003	Subterano	Cleary	Feature film	
2003	Paradise Found	Charles Arnaud	Feature film	
2003	Lennie Cahill Shoots Through	Twink	Feature film	
2004	Human Touch	Edward	Feature film	
2004	The Widower	Neville		
2005	Adrift	Albert	Short film	
2005	Jewboy	Sam	Feature film	
2006	Hotel Vladivostok	Man	Short film	
2006	Jindabyne	Gregory	Feature film	
2006	Vend	Mechanic 1	Short film	
2006	Solo	Arkan	Feature film	
2006	The Water Diary		Short film	
2007	Swing	Mr Doyle	Short film	
2007	The Tank		Short film	
2008	You Better Watch Out	Santa	Short film	
2008	The Weight of Sunken Treasure	Michael Dooley (old)	Short film	
2008	A Pretty Penny	Jack	Short film	
2008	Salvation	Architect	Feature film	
2008	The View from Greenhaven	Dashiell	Feature film	
2008	The Last Confession of Alexander Pearce	Robert Knopwood	Feature film	
2008	8	Lunch guest	Anthology film (Segment: The Water Diary)	
2009	Correspondence	Quentin Samuels	Short film	
2009	The Boys Are Back	Tom	Feature film	
2010	Beneath Hill 60	Colonel Wilson Rutledge	Feature film	
2010	Savages Crossing	Chris	Feature film	
2011	Sleeping Beauty	Man	Feature film	
2011	Busong: Palawan Fate	Landowner		
2011	Swerve	Armstrong	Feature film	
2012	Almayer’s Folly (aka Mountain of Gold or Hanyut)	Captain Ford	Feature film	
2013	The Interviewer	Paul Dexter	Short film	
2013	Spirit Harbour	Cyril	Short film	
2013	Return to Nim's Island	Grant	Feature film	
2014	Love is Now	Ben	Feature film	
2014	The Bugle's Call	Bluebroker	Short film	
2014	Wedding of the Year	Bede	Feature film	
2015	The Spa	Don	Short film	
2016	Gangster Drag	Jimmy	Short film	
2016	The Dam	Jack	Short film	
2017	Australia Day	Dr Ian Norris	Feature film	
2017	Boar	Jack	Feature film	
2017	Third World Man	Colin Finch	Short film	
2018	Skewwhiff	Bill	Short film	
2019	The Projectionist	Jack	Short film	
2019	Dirt Music	Warwick	Feature film	
2020	Groundhog Night	Ralph	Short film	
2020	Sweet River	Nigel	Feature film	
2021	Love You Like That	Gerard	Feature film	
2022	The Aussie Boys	Jack	Anthology film (Segment: The Dam)	
2023	First Drop	Ted	Short film	
2024	The Way, My Way	Bill	Feature film	
2026	Body Blow	Sampson Steele	Feature film	
2026	The Gathering Light	Clive	Short film	
2026	Inheritance	Pop	Short film (post-production)	

=== As crew ===
Year	Title	Notes	Notes	Ref
1971	Violence in the Cinema, Part 1	Stunt driver	Short film	
1976	Alvin Purple	Writer	Episode "Ciao Alvin"	
1986	Malcolm	Unit manager	Feature film	
1989	Island	Assistant to light technician	Feature film	
1991	The Media Project	Producer	Film	
1993	Touch Me	Gaffer	Short film	
2001	The Diaries of Vaslav Nijinsky	Assistant to director / Unit associate	Feature film	
2001	One Night the Moon	Unit associate	Short film	
2005	The Remarkable Mr. Kaye	Camera operator	Documentary film	
2008	Salvation	Gaffer / Grip	Feature film	
2010	The Making of Savages Crossing	Director / Camera	Special	
2015	The Crater	Casting director		
2015	Force of Destiny	Art director / Unit manager / Set decorator / Location manager	Feature film	
	The Crossing	Producer		
TBA	We Were Only 19	Casting director	Post-production	

== Theatre ==
Year	Play	Character	Theatre	Ref
	The Enemy	Paul	Barn Theatre, Loughton, UK	
	Dandy Dick	French Waiter	Barn Theatre, Loughton, UK	
	Julius Caesar	Titinius	Barn Theatre, Loughton, UK	
1971	The Man of Mode	John Trat	Old Tote Theatre, Sydney	
1971	Arturo Ui	Fish	Old Tote Theatre, Sydney	
1971	The Dutch Courtesan	Halifernes Reinesaire	Old Tote Theatre, Sydney	
1971	The Government Inspector	Lexia	Old Tote Theatre, Sydney	
	Rashomon	Bandit	St Martin's Theatre	
1971; 1972	The Removalists		Playbox Theatre, Sydney, Nimrod, Sydney	
1972	The Legend of King O'Malley	Andrew Fisher / The Revivalist / Politician	Hunter Theatre, Sydney, Old Tote Theatre, Sydney, Downstage Theatre, Wellington, Mercury Theatre, Auckland, Civic Theatre Fiji	
1972	On Yer Marx: Bigotry V.C.	Super Groover	Nimrod, Sydney	
1972	On Yer Marx: Housey		Nimrod, Sydney	
1973	The Tooth of Crime	Crow	Nimrod, Sydney	
1973	Kaspar	Prompter	Nimrod, Sydney	
1973	Jumpers	Jumper	Russell St Theatre, Melbourne with MTC	
1973	Who?		Pram Factory, Melbourne with APG	
1973	The Dumb Waiter	Alex	Pram Factory, Melbourne with APG	
1973–1974	Kookaburra	Steve	Nimrod, Sydney, Russell St Theatre, Melbourne	
1974	Well Hung	Wally the Village Idiot	Nimrod, Sydney	
1974	My Foot, My Tutor	Warden / Ward	Nimrod, Sydney	
1975	Ginge's Last Stand	Tiger Brown	Nimrod, Sydney	
1975	The Ride Across Lake Constance			
1976	The Recruiting Officer		Nimrod, Sydney	
1977	A Midsummer Night's Dream	Bottom	Independent Theatre, Sydney	
1977	Going Home	Jim	Nimrod, Sydney	
1977	Fifth Australian National Playwrights' Conference		Canberra	
1977	Yamashita	Yamashita	Playhouse, Canberra with Australian National Playwrights Conference	
1978	Smiles and Piles	Actor/Singer	Kirribilli Pub Theatre, Sydney	
1980	She'll Be Right	Actor/Director	Parramatta Correctional Centre with Pros and Cons Playhouse	
1993	Summer of the Aliens	Eric / Mr Ervin	Wharf Theatre, Sydney with STC	
1993–1994	The Rise and Fall of Little Voice	Ray Say	Playhouse, Perth, Wharf Theatre, Sydney with STC	
1997	Black Mary	Fred Britten	Carriageworks, Sydney with Company B	
2000	A Cheery Soul	Mr Custance	Sydney Opera House with STC & Company B	
2004	Victory: Choices in Reaction	Mobberley	Wharf Theatre, Sydney with STC	
2008	Cat on a Hot Tin Roof	Big Daddy	Victorian Arts Centre with MTC	
2010	Quack	Dr Littlewood	Stables Theatre, Sydney with Griffin Theatre Co	
2010	Hippolytos Raised		Roundhouse Theatre, Brisbane with La Boite Theatre Co	
2014	Bingo UNIT	The Judge	Chifley Theatre, Renmark, Sir Robert Helpmann Theatre, Mt Gambier	
