= The Bit Part =

- Directed by: Brendan Maher
- Written by: Steve Vizard; Peter Herbert; Ian McFadyen
- Produced by: John Gauci; Peter Herbert; Executive: Steve Vizard
- Starring: Chris Haywood; Nicole Kidman
- Cinematography: Ellery Ryan
- Music by: Paul Grabowsky; Red Symons
- Release date: 1987
- Country: Australia
- Language: English
- Budget: A$1.1 million

The Bit Part is a 1987 Australian comedy film directed by Brendan Maher and starring Chris Haywood and Nicole Kidman.

The film never achieved theatrical release and went straight to television.

== Cast ==
- Chris Haywood as Michael Thornton
- Nicole Kidman as Mary McAlister
- Maurie Fields as Peter
- John Wood as John Bainbridge
- David Stratton
- Deborra-Lee Furness as Acting Teacher
- Jane Turner as Actor in Play
- Christopher Mayer as David
- Wilbur Wilde as Bikie
- Des 'Animal' McKenna as Bikie
- Red Symons as Bikie
- Reg Gorman as Scott
- Ian McFadyen as Commercial Director
