= Tina Bursill =

Australian actress (born 1951)

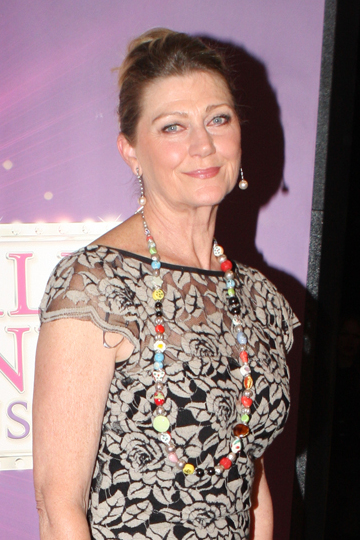
- Bursill in 2012
- Born: 24 July 1951 (age 75); Sydney, Australia
- Occupation: Actress
- Years active: 1973–present
- Notable work: Skyways (1979–1981); Prisoner (1983–1984); Doctor Doctor (2016–2021)

Tina Bursill (born 24 July 1951) is an Australian actress. She played Louise Carter on the television series Skyways (1979–1981) and Sonia Stevens on Prisoner (1983–1984). She played Meryl Knight in the Nine Network drama series Doctor Doctor. Bursill won the AFI (AACTA) Award for Best Supporting Actress for the 1987 film Jilted.

== Early life ==
Tina Bursill was born on 24 July 1951, in Sydney.

Bursill's father, Keith, worked as an apprentice marine engineer on Cockatoo Island in Sydney Harbour from the age of 15, and joined the merchant marines when Bursill was a baby, travelling for about 14 years. He was diagnosed with asbestosis in the 1980s. Her mother was a talented coloratura soprano, but did not follow her dreams. She had a love of painting, film and theatre and frequently took Bursill to see live shows from a very young age.

During the school holidays, Bursill would visit her paternal grandfather, who was a builder, in Forster, on the mid-north New South Wales coast.

Bursill met her first boyfriend when she was 15 and they were together for several years. She thought it would lead to marriage and babies, but it was not to be.

Initially, Bursill intended to pursue a career in anthropology, however, she set her sights on becoming an actress. She was initially rejected from National Institute of Dramatic Art, but later studied there.

== Career ==
=== Theatre ===
Bursill started her career in musicals and stand-up comedy, including stagings of Grease (1972) and Godspell (1972–1973), before being cast in more serious theatre productions, such as Zastrozzi (1982) and On Golden Pond (1992). She also starred in Macbeth as Lady Macbeth for Sydney's Ensemble Theatre.

More recently, Bursill was in a 2022 production of Cinderella with Opera Australia and a 2024 staging of The Children with STCSA.

=== Television ===
Bursill made her television debut in 1973, appearing in the lead role of short-lived comedy series The People Next Door, as Meg Penrose. She was a regular character alongside Michele Fawdon and Tony Sheldon in daily soap opera The Unisexers which was launched in 1975 on the Nine Network, however the program's low ratings led to its cancellation and removal from broadcast after only three weeks.

Following this were several guest appearances, before she received the role of ambitious assistant airport manager Louise Carter in Seven Network drama series Skyways, for which she appeared in 109 episodes from 1979 to 1981. During this period, Bursill also had a recurring role on police drama series, King's Men between 1976 and 1980, as undercover policewoman, 'Jaybee' Giddings. However, low ratings ensured the series was axed after only 13 episodes.

In 1982, Bursill appeared in ten-part ABC drama miniseries Winner Take All, as Liz Bell, mistress of the main character Dick Coleman’s mistress, mining company employee. The following year, she was cast in the role of Sonia Stevens on Network Ten's cult classic prison drama series Prisoner (Prisoner: Cell Block H), in which she was introduced in the fifth season as a devious ice queen, imprisoned for heroin trafficking. She remained in the series until 1984. After departing Prisoner, Bursill appeared in recurring roles in A Country Practice as Bianca Forbes-Hamilton (1981) and Cecily Day (1985) and Hey Dad..! as Det. Sgt. Anne Burke (1987).

Bursill had a recurring role on the Seven Network soap opera Home and Away in 1992, as schoolteacher Lois Crawford. She later also played the recurring role Stella Patterson from 2001 to 2002. In 1997, she landed a role in Heartbreak High from season five, portraying Hilary Scheppers (the mother of characters Ryan and Anita), after having previously appeared in the series a year earlier as TV news reporter, Trish Ferro.

Bursill portrayed Moody family matriarch, Maree, in the 2011 miniseries A Moody Christmas. She then reprised her role as Maree in the series follow-up, The Moodys, in 2014. Also in 2014, she had a recurring guest role in drama series The Time of Our Lives, as Lenore, the alcoholic mother of Herb (Stephen Curry). That same year, during its thirtieth season, Bursill appeared in long-running soap opera Neighbours, in the recurring role of Kathy Carpenter, mother of Lauren Turner (Kate Kendall) and ex-wife of Lou Carpenter (Tom Oliver). She had previously appeared opposite Oliver in King's Men.

Bursill took a brief hiatus from acting, to care full time for her ailing father. Six weeks after he died, she auditioned for drama series Doctor Doctor landing the role of Meryl Knight, mayor and mother of disgraced surgeon Hugh Knight (Rodger Corser), in 2016. Steve Bisley played the role of her husband. She portrayed Meryl for seasons one to five. The role saw her nominated for an AACTA Award for Best Actress in a Supporting Role in 2017. The following year she was nominated once more, this time for Best Actress in a Leading Role.

Almost 40 years after appearing in Prisoner, Bursill featured in the 2021 final season of the show's reimagining, Wentworth, in the role of murderer Eve Wilder, a role originated by Lynda Stoner in the original series. Bursill's original Prisoner role of Sonia Stevens had been reimagined by Sigrid Thornton, not long prior.

In 2023, Bursill had a recurring role in six-part mystery drama series One Night, as Helen Owen, the estranged mother of Tess, played by English actress Jodie Whittaker. She then appeared in Foxtel/Binge drama Strife, also returning for the second season. In 2023, Bursill also had a role in Stan post-war series Ten Pound Poms, playing Mrs Walker, mother of JJ, played by Stephen Curry (making it the second series in which she played Curry's mother). She reprised the role in the show's second season in 2025.

2026 saw Bursill appear in her first children's series Caper Crew, for ABC, playing stylishly dressed grandmother, Queenie. On 27 March 2026, she was named in the extended cast for the third season of Return to Paradise, the Australian spin-off of British crime series Death in Paradise.

=== Film ===
Bursill made her feature film debut in 1975 when she was cast in The Great Macarthy, a football-based comedy with John Jarratt and Barry Humphries. Her next film role came in 1984, when she appeared in Melvin, Son of Alvin (the second sequel to the 1973 comedy, Alvin Purple), as 60 Minutes-style reporter, Dee Tanner. In 1987, she starred in Jilted, which earned her an Australian Film Institute Award for Best Actress in a Supporting Role.

Further film credits include Afraid to Dance (1988), Spider and Rose (1994), Billy's Holiday (1995), The Goddess of 1967 (2000), Son of the Mask (2005), Three Blind Mice (2007), Wish You Were Here (2012) and The Flip Side (2018).

She has also had roles in several made-for-television films, including biopic Never Tell Me Never (1998) alongside Claudia Karvan and Michael Caton, Aftershocks (1998), a docudrama about the 1989 Newcastle earthquake with Jeremy Sims, Susie Porter and Lynette Curran, and Heroes' Mountain (2002), retelling the true story of the 1997 Thredbo landslide and the plight of Stuart Diver (as played by Craig McLachlan). In 2013, she played the role of Pat in the TV film Jack Irish: Dead Point, opposite Guy Pearce in the title role. This also reunited her with her The Great Macarthy co-star Barry Humphries.

== Personal life ==
Bursill was in an on-and-off relationship with Australian singer Shirley Strachan, while she was working on the series Skyways and during Strachan's tenure on Shirl's Neighbourhood. The pair also did several charity junkets together during that time. Bursill has never been married but her most significant relationship lasted 14 years and she is on good terms with both him and his two daughters.

Bursill's father had a stroke in the late 1990s and then a mini-stroke in 2015, so she moved in with him to care for him in the final year of his life. Her mother died of dementia in 2013.

== Filmography ==
=== Film ===
Year	Title	Role	Type	Ref.
1973	Solomon		TV film	
1975	The Great Macarthy	Miss Deevil	Feature film	
1978	A Good Thing Going	Jeanette	TV film	
1984	Melvin, Son of Alvin	Reporter Dee Tanner	Feature film	
1985	Robbery	Suzy	TV film	
1986	The Three Musketeers	Voice	Animated TV film	
1986	A Single Life	Billie Russell	TV film	
1987	Jilted	Paula	Feature film	
1989	Afraid to Dance	Driving Woman	Feature film	
1991	Dusty Hearts		Short film	
1992	The Distant Home	Dr. Rosen	TV film	
1994	Spider and Rose	Sister Abbott	Feature film	
1995	Billy's Holiday	Louise	Feature film	
1997	Entertaining Angels	Dr Crystal Stein	Short film	
1998	Never Tell Me Never	Virginia	TV film	
1998	Aftershocks	Kerri Ingram	TV film	
2000	The Goddess of 1967	Esther	Feature film	
2000	Cheek to Cheek	Julie	Short film	
2002	Heroes' Mountain	Margy Donald	TV film	
2003	Saturn's Return	Sheila	Short film (also part of the French anthology film Courts mais GAY: Tome 5	
2003	BlackJack	Carmen Seaton	TV film	
2003	The Hit		Short film	
2004	Small Claims	Rhonda	TV film	
2004	Plains Empty	Bar Woman	Short film	
2005	Son of the Mask	Network Executive	Feature film	
2007	Shuffle	Denise	Short film	
2007	One of the Lucky Ones	Additional Voice (voice)	Short film	
2007	Pleasance	Marie	Short film	
2008	Three Blind Mice	Candy	Feature film	
2011	Random 8	Narrator / Investigator	Short film	
2012	Wish You Were Here	Margie McKinney	Feature film	
2013	Bloody Henry	Jane	Short film	
2014	Jack Irish: Dead Point	Pat	TV film	
2015	Going Down		Short film	
2018	The Flip Side	Iris	Feature film	
	Julia	Helen	Short film	

=== Television ===
Year	Title	Role	Type	Ref
1973	The People Next Door	Meg Penrose	20 episodes	
1974	Silent Number	Annette	1 episode	
1974	A Touch of Reverence		Miniseries	
1975	The Unisexers	Felicity	16 episodes	
1975	Matlock Police	Jennifer Craig	1 episode	
1975	The Dave Allen Show in Australia	Various characters		
1976	Alvin Purple	Bernice	Episode 9: "The Rhythm Method"	
1976	King's Men	Policewoman Jaybee Giddings	13 episodes	
1976	The Emigrants	Nurse Watson	Episode 3: "13,000 Miles Away"	
1978	Chopper Squad	Mother	Season 1, episode 12: "Dangerous Weapon"	
1979	The Oracle		1 episode	
1979–1980	Skyways	Louise Carter	136 episodes	
1981	Holiday Island	Elizabeth	Episode 27: "Never Too Old"	
1981; 1986	A Country Practice	Bianca Forbes-Hamilton / Cecily Day	2 episodes / 14 episodes	
1982	Winner Take All	Liz Bell	Miniseries, 10 episodes	
1983–1984	Prisoner	Sonia Stevens	54 episodes	
1984	Special Squad	Meredith	Episode 25: "The Bribe"	
1985	The Fast Lane	Felicity	1 episode	
1987	Australian Traineeship System	Herself	Documentary	
1987	Willing and Abel	Margaret Hill	3 episodes	
1987	Hey Dad...!	Det. Sgt. Anne Burke	6 episodes	
1987–1988	Rafferty's Rules	Erica Jamison	2 episodes	
1989	This Man... This Woman	Liz Maddocks	Miniseries, 2 episodes	
1990	Jackaroo	Martha Logan	Miniseries, 2 episodes	
1990	The Flying Doctors	Billie Sorensen	Season 7, episode 15: "Billie and Pete"	
1991; 1995	G.P.	Caroline Lalor / Adele Meyer	2 episodes	
1991; 2002	Home and Away	Lois Crawford / Stella Patterson	31 episodes	
1992	Bony	Peta	Episode 6: "Surf, Sun... and Murder"	
1992	EEO Free For All Forum	Narrator	Documentary	
1993	Cluedo		1 episode	
1994	Mother and Son	Carmen	1 episode	
1994	Under The Skin	Julie	Episode 9: "Long Way Round"	
1994	The Ferals	White Ant (voice)	Season 1, episode 10: "Exam Fever"	
1995	Over the Hill		1 episode	
1996; 1997	Heartbreak High	Trish Ferra / Hilary Scheppers	1 episode / 36 episodes	
1996	Pacific Drive		1 episode	
1998	Murder Call	Lori Magnus	Season 2, episode 3	
1999; 2008	All Saints	Robyn Simms / Helen Fahey / Margaret Evans	3 episodes	
2000	Farscape	Empress Novia	3 episodes	
2001; 2002	BackBerner	Jennie Turk / Naomi Kennedy	2 episodes	
2001	Corridors of Power	Petra	1 episode	
2002	MDA	Dr. Ruth McIntyre	1 episode	
2003	Grass Roots	Ariadne Totos	Season 2, 1 episode	
2003	Always Greener	Lucy Buckingham	2 episodes	
2003	White Collar Blue	Carole	1 episode	
2004	Out There	Jean Filson	Season 2, episode 10	
2005	Blue Water High	Katrina	1 episode	
2005	Dramatically Black		1 episode	
2011	Offspring	Marilyn	2 episodes	
2011	Crownies	Magistrate Ellen Hansby	1 episode	
2012	Rake	Miriam	Season 2, 1 episode	
2012	A Moody Christmas	Maree Moody	6 episodes	
2013–2014	The Time of Our Lives	Lenore	3 episodes	
2014	The Moodys	Maree Moody	8 episodes	
2014; 2016	Neighbours	Kathy Carpenter	21 episodes	
2016–2021	Doctor Doctor	Meryl Knight	48 episodes	
2017	Drop Dead Weird	Tweedy Lady	1 episode	
2019	Harrow	Alice Hobson	Season 2, 1 episode	
2019	Sarah's Channel	Mole Person	Web series	
2021	Wentworth	Eve Wilder	Season 8, 3 episodes	
2021	Frayed	Cathy	1 episode	
2023	One Night	Helen	4 episodes	
2023–2025	Strife	Ginny	Season 2, 16 episodes	
2023–2025	Ten Pound Poms	Mrs. Walker	9 episodes	
2026	Caper Crew	Queenie	TV series	
2026	Return to Paradise	TBA	TV series	

=== Other appearances ===
Year	Title	Role	Type
1976	Celebrity Squares	Contestant	1 episode
1985	Blankety Blanks	Contestant	2 episodes
1987	Have A Go	Judge	3 episodes
1991	The Main Event	Contestant	1 episode
2019	Talkin' Bout Your Generation	Contestant	1 episode

== Stage ==
Year	Title	Role	Type	Ref.
1971	Theatre In Education			
1971	Hippolytus		UNSW Old Tote Theatre, Sydney	
1971	Lady Windemere's Fan	Lady Windemere	NIDA Theatre, Sydney	
1972	Grease	Marty	Metro Theatre, Melbourne with Harry M. Miller	
1972	Great Banana Split		Twelfth Night Theatre, Brisbane	
1972–1973	Godspell		Richbroke Theatre	
1974	Scandals of '74		Macleay Theatre, Sydney	
1975	The Jockey Club Stakes		Her Majesty's Theatre, Adelaide & Princess Theatre Melbourne	
1977	Son of Naked Vicar		The Speakeasy, Sydney	
1977	The Big Bang Show		The Speakeasy, Sydney	
1977	Mothers and Fathers		UNSW Parade Theatre, Sydney	
1977–1978, 1983	Beyond Mozambique	Rita	Nimrod Theatre Company, Sydney	
1978	2001 – A Postcode		Kinselas, Sydney	
1981	Catch a Rising Star		Melbourne Theatre Restaurant	
1982	Zastrozzi	Matilda	Seymour Centre, Sydney	
1985	Tomfoolery	Various roles	Seymour Centre, Sydney for Festival of Sydney	
1986; 1990	Rough Crossing	Natasha Navratilova	Playhouse Adelaide, Sydney Opera House, Playhouse Canberra	
1988	Manning Clark's History of Australia – The Musical	Elizabeth Macarthur, St Peter, Caroline Chisholm, Kate Kelly, Lady Carrington.	Princess Theatre, Melbourne	
1989	Top Silk	Jane Fredericks	Australian tour with Kinsella Productions	
1992	On Golden Pond	Chelsea Thayer	Marian St Theatre, Sydney	
1992	Macbeth	Lady Macbeth	Ensemble Theatre, Sydney	
1993	The Sugar Mother	Cecilia Page	Bridge Theatre, Sydney & Sydney Opera House	
1994	Don't Dress for Dinner	Susanne	Regal Theatre, Perth, Canberra Theatre, Newcastle Civic Theatre with Ginmar Productions	
1998	Blinded by the Sun	Ghislane	Sydney Opera House	
1999	23 Blooms on My Great Grandmother's Rosebush	Sarah	Iland Robinson Productions	
2001	Up for Grabs	Dawn Grey	NSW/VIC/ACT tour	
2003	Purgatory Down Under		Sydney Opera House	
2004	The Vagina Monologues		University of Sydney	
2005	Flatfoot	Cleostrata	Australian national tour with Ensemble Theatre	
2006	Double Act	Alexandra	Australian regional tour with Hit Productions	
2007	ALP Arts Election Launch		Riverside Theatres Parramatta	
2008	Small Metal Objects	Carolyn	USA, Europe & Asia tour with Back to Back Theatre	
2010	The Swimming Club	Laura	Southbank Theatre, Melbourne, Playhouse Perth with Black Swan Theatre, Geelong Westfield with MTC	
	Vita & Virginia	Vita	Actors Forum	
	Maralinga	Various	Alphaville	
2015	The Man's Bitch (reading)	Angela Carter / Angelica Green	STC	
2015	Boys Will Be Boys	Arthur	Wharf Theatre, Sydney with STC	
2017	Me and My Girl	The Duchess of Dene	Hayes Theatre Co	
2018	The Feather in the Web	Various	Stables Theatre, Sydney with Griffin Theatre Company	
2022	Love Letters	Melissa Gardner	Ensemble Theatre, Sydney with Les Currie Productions	
2022	Cinderella	Madame (Stepmother)	Sydney Lyric Theatre, Regent Theatre, Melbourne with Opera Australia	
2024	The Children	Rose	Dunstan Playhouse with STCSA	

== Radio ==
Year	Title	Role	Type	Ref.
2015	A Thoroughly Wet Mess	Claire Delacroix	ABC Radio National	

== Awards & nominations ==
Year	Nominated work	Award	Category	Result	Ref.
1987	Jilted	Australian Film Institute Awards	Best Actress in a Supporting Role	Won	
2002	Up for Grabs	Mo Awards	Best Female Actor in a Play	Nominated	
2013	A Moody Christmas	Equity Ensemble Awards	Outstanding Performance by an Ensemble in a Comedy Series	Won	
2015	The Moodys	Equity Ensemble Awards	Outstanding Performance by an Ensemble in a Comedy Series	Won	
2017	Doctor Doctor	AACTA Awards	Best Supporting Actress	Nominated	
2018	Doctor Doctor	AACTA Awards	Best Actress	Nominated	
