= Jilted (film) =

- Directed by: Bill Bennett
- Written by: Bill Bennett
- Produced by: Bill Bennett; Jenny Day
- Starring: Richard Moir; Jennifer Cluff; Tina Bursill
- Edited by: Denise Hunter
- Music by: Michael Atkinson
- Production company: Mermaid Beach Productions
- Distributed by: The Home Cinema Group (video)
- Release date: 1987
- Running time: 89 minutes
- Country: Australia
- Language: English
- Budget: AU$600,000 or $730,000

Jilted is a 1987 film directed by Bill Bennett.

== Plot ==
Al is a chef at a tourist resort on a tropical island. His wife has just left him and he is having an affair with a waitress, Cindy, while the manager, Bob, tries to have an affair with Paula, the accountant.

Al falls for Harry, whose husband has slept with another man, and who is camping on the island.

== Cast ==
- Richard Moir as Al
- Jennifer Cluff as Harry
- Steve Jacobs as Bob
- Helen Mutkins as Cindy
- Tina Bursill as Paula
- Ken Radley as Doug

== Production ==
The script was inspired by the breakup of Bennett's first marriage. He said the film "explored the notion that people who have had a bad time in relationships sometimes have a distrust of going into other relationships." He later said "I think that script could have done with another 12 months' work."

Half the budget was raised by a pre-sale to J. C. Williamson who also sought finance for another feature by Bennett, Wrong Number. Bennett raised $250,000 door knocking in Queensland and then got $480,000 at the last minute.

The movie was shot on Fraser Island in February 1987, near Orchid Beach Resort.

== Release ==
The film was not released theatrically, despite Tina Burstill winning an AFI Award for Best Supporting Actress. It was released on video in 1989.

Variety wrote " Bill Bennett’s fourth feature is his best yet, a witty, moving rondo of relationships which bring to mind the best films of Alan Rudolph, sans the music. If pic gets the critical notices it deserves, it should perform well in arthouse situations in Australia."

The Age wrote "the dialogue is rather strained and one soon tires of picturesque scenes with nothing much happening in them." The Canberra Times called it "a sort of Fraser Island Fawlty Towers without so many laughs... For those who find this all a bit like an exotic version of Neighbours, I would recommend fast forwarding to the plentiful scenes of sun-drenched beaches, restless ocean and tropical vegetation."

Bill Bennett later said Jilted and another film of his, Dear Cardholder, "were good attempts, but I think I went into them too quickly and I don't think the ideas were realised as well as they could have been." This led to him taking a break from making features for a number of years.
