= Tempted (film) =

2001 film by Bill Bennett

- Film poster
- Directed by: Bill Bennett
- Written by: Bill Bennett
- Starring: Peter Facinelli; Burt Reynolds; Saffron Burrows
- Cinematography: Tony Clark
- Edited by: Henry Dangar
- Music by: David Bridie
- Production company: Gold Circle Films
- Distributed by: TF1 International
- Release date: 7 September 2001
- Running time: 95 minutes
- Countries: Australia; France; United States
- Language: English

Tempted is a 2001 Australian-French-American thriller film written and directed by Bill Bennett and starring Peter Facinelli, Burt Reynolds and Saffron Burrows.

== Plot ==
Struggling to come to terms with his mortality, construction contractor Charlie LeBlanc seeks to test the fidelity of his wife, Lilly, a former model who is 30 years his junior. Accompanied by his henchman Dot Collins, Charlie visits one of his construction sites in New Orleans and propositions freelance carpenter Jimmy Mulate to seduce Lilly. Charlie offers Mulate $10,000 upfront, with an additional $50,000 if he succeeds, plus a further $40,000 if he can accurately describe Lilly’s tattoo to Charlie in perfect detail. Despite being initially hesitant, Mulate eventually agrees at the urging of his friend, Ted, who encourages Mulate to use the money to pay for his law school education.

Having accepted his offer, Charlie informs Lilly that he is leaving New Orleans for a week-long business trip and that Mulate should be expected to arrive at the house in the coming days to repair a broken door. Before leaving, Charlie visits his friend, private investigator Byron Blades, and asks for help surveilling Lilly and Jimmy during his absence. Although Blades initially refuses, he ultimately agrees and installs cameras and microphones throughout the LeBlanc mansion as Lilly drives Charlie to the airport.

The next day, Mulate fixes the broken door and attempts to seduce Lilly. She eventually draws a gun on him and asks Mulate to leave. Mulate later apologizes, offering to make amends by inviting her out for the evening. Lilly accepts, and the two go out for drinking and dancing before she departs amid conflicting feelings and after having seen Charlie's work associates at a club.

Mulate returns home to find a bloodied Ted, who has just killed the son of Louisiana’s reportedly homosexual governor. Mulate assists Ted in disposing of the body in the Mississippi River.

Charlie's secretary, Heather, reveals Charlie's plot to Lilly the next day. Though initially overwhelmed, she calls Mulate because she needs a window repaired. Mulate arrives, and the two have sex.

Upon returning from Dallas, Charlie visits Blades, who turns over footage of Lilly and Mulate having sex. When confronted, Mulate initially lies to Charlie and Collins, falsely reassuring them of Lilly's fidelity. Charlie physically assaults Mulate and orders him to help him kill Lilly, threatening to kill Mulate's father if he does not oblige. Mulate later warns Lilly, who implores Mulate that they need to kill Charlie, but not before the two have sex a second time; while undressing, Mulate spots a tattoo that reads “Dakota #7” on Lilly's inner thigh.

That evening, Charlie and Lilly are accosted, as Charlie is shot twice and killed; Lilly draws a gun from her purse and shoots the masked assailant. When police arrive, the assailant is revealed to be Ted. Blades meets Mulate at a bar and presents him with a recording of Lilly and Mulate in flagrante delicto, during which Lilly proposes they kill Charlie. Mulate then reaches out to his attorney. Unaware that he and Lilly share the legal counsel services of David Crabbe, Esq., Mulate and Crabbe review the recording. Mulate asks what Crabbe can do for him regarding securing immunity to secure his innocence in exchange for incriminating evidence against Lilly. Crabbe advises Mulate to leave the recording with him to see what can be done. Mulate is about to leave the recording with Crabbe when a speakerphone announcement says that Lilly, Mrs. Leblanc, is on hold for Crabbe. Mulate then strikes Crabbe and flees with the recording. Crabbe and other personnel try to take possession of the recording, but Mulate evades them.

Lilly offers Mulate $500,000 for the recording, and the two agree to exchange at a swamp shack given to Mulate by his father. Unbeknownst to Lilly, Mulate cooperates with police and has Blades and other members of law enforcement listen in on their conversation. Blades and the cops move in when they hear a gunshot fired by Lilly at Mulate; in the ensuing chaos, Collins arrives with a shotgun, seeking to kill Lilly and Mulate. Collins dies in a shootout with police, and Lilly is arrested after telling Mulate she cannot trust him.

== Cast ==
- Peter Facinelli as Jimmy Mulate
- Saffron Burrows as Lilly LeBlanc
- Burt Reynolds as Charlie LeBlanc
- Mike starr as Dot Collins
