= Dear Cardholder =

- Directed by: Bill Bennett
- Written by: Bill Bennett
- Produced by: Bill Bennett
- Starring: Robin Ramsay; Jennifer Cluff
- Production company: Mermaid Beach Productions
- Distributed by: Home Cinema Group (video)
- Release date: 1989
- Running time: 92 minutes
- Country: Australia
- Language: English
- Budget: A$500,000

Dear Cardholder is a 1989 Australian film about a man who gets into credit card debt while attempting to design a tax planner computer program. It was written and directed by Bill Bennett and stars Robin Ramsay.

== Plot ==
Hec Harris works for the Australian Taxation Office, with his office job consisting only of stamping "nil returns." He lives with his daughter Jo as a single parent, with the mother having died. Hec wishes to obtain a credit card with a $10,000 limit in order to buy an Apple computer that can run Microsoft Excel. He wants the computer as a business investment, as he wishes to design a new tax planner computer program. When he applies for a credit card, he finds he does not have a credit rating as he has never taken out a loan or owed money to anyone before. After obtaining a $500 loan from the bank and paying it back immediately with fees, he gets the card and buys the computer plus an electronic keyboard for his daughter Jo, who is an aspiring musician. Meanwhile, Hec becomes enamored with a chicken farmer named Aggie who is in trouble with the ATO and the Egg Board for refusing to pay a levy. Seemingly not understanding how credit cards work, Hec buys a tractor off her to get her out of debt. He then takes her on an expensive dinner date and attempts to pay for it with the card, which declines. He finds out he has spent over $10,000 in six days and must begin paying it back.

Hec is then fired from his ATO job and decides to pay back the debt by obtaining more credit cards, but they are quickly cancelled by the bank. He also wants an additional $5,000 to buy an additional 200 megabytes of computer memory. Increasingly desperate for money, he sells all the furniture in his apartment then takes out a loan with a 65% interest rate from a loan shark at a pawn shop, giving one of Jo's necklaces as collateral. With no food in the house, Jo begins shoplifting food. She is caught by the police, who place Jo under state care when they realise Hec is failing to provide for her.

Returning to his apartment, Hec finds that the landlord Hart has rented it to someone else and sold his computer and floppy disks, plus Jo's keyboard, to a pawn shop, which turns out to be the same one Hec already owes money to. He is roughed up by the proprietor because of the unpaid debt and is unable to get the computer back, which has already been onsold. Breaking into the pawn shop at night, Hec finds the address of the buyer and gets back the necklace he left as collateral. Heading to the address, he finds the computer was sold to a brothel run by a madame named Antoinette who asks for $12,000 for both the computer and the disks. Refusing to pay, he is ejected from the premises only to find that his car is being stolen. He then spends the night sleeping on the street then eats at a soup kitchen for the homeless.

Hec then goes to Aggie's farm and spends the night with her, where he is reunited with Jo who apparently ran away from state care. Aggie takes a mortgage out on the farm in order to lend Hec the money for him to get both the computer and keyboard back. He finds that one of the floppy disks is missing, and Antoinette tells him she threw it out. Hec and Aggie then go to a dump and begin manually searching for the disk in piles of garbage. Antoinette arrives at the dump and gives them the disk for free, which it turns out was not thrown away after all. Jo takes her keyboard to a musical audition, where the police catch up with her and she is taken back into state care. Aggie finds out she is bankrupt and must sell the farm. Hec finally finishes the program, but a fed-up Aggie asks him to leave and calls him a loser.

Hec pitches the program to the Australian office of Apple Computers, who are impressed but tell him he is a month too late as a similar tax planner program has just been developed by Microsoft and is soon to be released worldwide. Aggie's refusal to pay the levy makes the news, as she stresses civil disobedience to a TV film crew: "If the government makes bad laws, then people should just break them." Public support leads to her getting her farm back, while Hec is offered a lucrative job with Apple which he happily accepts. He then tells the bank he wants to cancel his credit card, and is charged a $200 cancellation fee.

== Production and release ==
Dear Cardholder was not released theatrically, but was eventually aired as a telemovie on the Nine Network in November 1989. Bennett later stated he felt he made a mistake by not making the film funny enough or its protagonist sufficiently sympathetic, and that he should have spent more time on the script.

== Critical reception ==
Alison Stewart in The Sydney Morning Herald found the film to be "a sometimes sad, occasionally happy, periodically silly but mainly touching film about the powerlessness of the small person in the face of bureaucratic pig-ignorance." Barbara Hooks in The Age called the film "wonderfully observed... peppered with deliciously satirical dialogue." Green Guide called the film "topical in today's climate of consumer debt."

== Cast ==
- Robin Ramsay as Hec Harris
- Jennifer Cluff as Aggie Smith
- Peter Kowitz as Furniture Man
- John Ewart as Hart
- Arianthe Galani as Antoinette
