= Bill Bennett (director) =

Australian film director

- Born: London, England
- Occupations: Film director Film producer Screenwriter
- Years active: 1983–present
- Website: www.billbennett.com.au

Bill Bennett is an Australian filmmaker and author of young adult fiction. He was formerly a journalist. His 2024 Australian drama film, The Way, My Way, based on his memoir, was a surprise hit at the Australian box office.

== Early life and education ==
Bill Bennett was born in London to Australian parents and brought up in Brisbane. He studied medicine for some years at the University of Queensland, but left before completing his studies.

== Career ==
=== Journalism ===
Bennett got a cadetship with the Australian Broadcasting Corporation (ABC) in 1972, where he was given the nickname "milkfingers" as a result of an on-air mishap.

He spent two years working in Adelaide on This Day Tonight, then went to work for Mike Willesee in Sydney. He then worked on The Big Country and The Australians before moving into feature filmmaking in the early 1980s.

During a ten-year career as a journalist he won Australia's top TV award, the Logie Awards for Television Reporter of the Year, and then later for Most Outstanding Documentary. This led him to feature films.

=== Filmmaking ===
Bennett's first film, A Street to Die (1985) won the Crystal Globe for Best Film at the Karlovy Vary Film Festival. His second film Backlash was screened in the Un Certain Regard section at the 1986 Cannes Film Festival. Three years later his film Malpractice would be screened in the same section at the 1989 festival. His Outback film noir Kiss or Kill won 5 Australian Film Institute Awards, including two for Bill - Best Picture and Best Director.}

His two theatrical feature documentaries, Intuition is your Personal Guidance System and Facing Fear were the first two films in a proposed series called the My Journey series.

Bennett's 2024 Australian drama film, The Way, My Way, based on his memoir, was a surprise hit at the Australian box office.

=== Publications ===
Bennett is also an author, having published a YA supernatural thriller trilogy Palace of Fires.

== Selected filmography ==
Documentary film

| Year | Title | Director | Writer | Producer |
|---|---|---|---|---|
| 1983 | The Cattle King | Yes | Yes | Yes |
| 1984 | Shipwrecked | Yes | Yes | Yes |
| 1991 | The Banjo & The Bard | Yes | Yes | Yes |
| 1992 | Last Man Hanged | No | No | Yes |
| 2018 | Intuition is your Personal Guidance System | Yes | Yes | Yes |
| 2022 | Facing Fear | Yes | Yes | Yes |

Feature film

| Year | Title | Director | Writer | Producer |
|---|---|---|---|---|
| 1985 | A Street to Die | Yes | Yes | Yes |
| 1986 | Backlash | Yes | Yes | Yes |
| 1987 | Dear Cardholder | Yes | Yes | Yes |
| 1988 | Jilted | Yes | Yes | Yes |
| 1989 | Malpractice | Yes | Yes | No |
| 1990 | Mortgage | Yes | Yes | No |
| 1994 | Spider and Rose | Yes | Yes | No |
| 1995 | Two if by Sea | Yes | No | No |
| 1996 | Kiss or Kill | Yes | Yes | Yes |
| 1999 | In a Savage Land | Yes | Yes | Yes |
| 2000 | Tempted | Yes | Yes | Yes |
| 2000 | Cut | No | Uncredited | Yes |
| 2002 | The Nugget | Yes | Yes | Yes |
| 2005 | Deck Dogz | No | No | Yes |
| 2010 | Uninhabited | Yes | Yes | Yes |
| 2024 | The Way, My Way | Yes | Yes | Yes |
