= 1987 Australian Film Institute Awards =

Australian film and television award ceremony

29th Australian Film Institute Awards
- Date: 9 October 1987
- Location: Palais Theatre, Melbourne

Television/radio coverage
- Networks
- ABC-TV

The 29th Australian Film Institute Awards were awards held by the Australian Film Institute to celebrate the best of Australian films and television of 1987. The awards ceremony was held at the Palais Theatre in Melbourne on 9 October 1987.

== Feature film ==
Best Film: The Year My Voice Broke — Terry Hayes, Doug Mitchell, George Miller; Ground Zero — Michael Pattinson; High Tide — Sandra Levy, Antony I. Ginnane; The Tale of Ruby Rose — Bryce Menzies, Andrew Wiseman	Best Direction: John Duigan — The Year My Voice Broke; Gillian Armstrong — High Tide; Michael Pattinson, Bruce Myles — Ground Zero; Roger Scholes — The Tale of Ruby Rose
Best Lead Actor: Leo McKern — Travelling North; Bryan Brown — The Umbrella Woman; Colin Friels — Ground Zero; Noah Taylor — The Year My Voice Broke	Best Lead Actress: Judy Davis — High Tide; Wendy Hughes — Shadows of the Peacock; Loene Carmen — The Year My Voice Broke; Julia Blake — Travelling North
Best Supporting Actor: Ben Mendelsohn — The Year My Voice Broke; Donald Pleasence — Ground Zero; Bobby Smith — Initiation; Steven Vidler — The Umbrella Woman	Best Supporting Actress: Jan Adele — High Tide; Kaarin Fairfax — Belinda; Claudia Karvan — High Tide; Julie Hamilton — The Place at the Coast
Best Original Screenplay: John Duigan — The Year My Voice Broke; Pamela Gibbons — Belinda; Mac Gudgeon, Jan Sardi — Ground Zero; Laura Jones — High Tide	Best Adapted Screenplay: David Williamson — Travelling North; Don McLennan — Slate, Wyn and Me; Hilary Furlong — The Place at the Coast; Paul Cox — Vincent
Best Cinematography: Ground Zero — Steve Dobson; Belinda — Malcolm McCulloch; The Umbrella Woman — James Bartle; Warm Nights on a Slow Moving Train — Yuri Sokol	Best Editing: Ground Zero — David Pulbrook; Bullseye — Richard Francis-Bruce; The Umbrella Woman — John Scott; The Year My Voice Broke — Neil Thumpston
Best Original Music Score: The Tale of Ruby Rose — Paul Schutze; Shadows of the Peacock — William Motzing; The Umbrella Woman — Cameron Allen; Those Dear Departed — Phillip Scott	Best Sound: Ground Zero — Gary Wilkins, Mark Wasiutak, Roger Savage, Livia Ruzic, Craig Carter; Belinda — Tim Lloyd, Martin Oswin, John Herron, David Huggert, Glen Auchinachie, Dimity Gregson; High Tide — Peter Fenton, Phil Heywood, Ben Osmo, Geoff Krix, John Jordan, Anne Breslin, John Patterson; Shadows of the Peacock — Tim Lloyd, Greg Bell, Peter Fenton, Phil Heywood, Martin Oswin
Best Production Design: Ground Zero — Brian Thomson; Bullseye — George Liddle; The Place at the Coast — Owen Paterson; To Market, To Market — Virginia Rouse	Best Costume Design: The Umbrella Woman — Jennie Tate; Bullseye — George Liddle; The Place at the Coast — Anna French; Those Dear Departed — Roger Ford

== Television ==
Best Telefeature: Two Friends (ABC) — Jan Chapman; Call Me Mr. Brown (Network Ten) — Scott Hicks, Terry Jennings; Hunger (ABC) — Jan Chapman; The Hour Before My Brother Dies (ABC) — Noel Price	Best Mini Series: The Great Bookie Robbery (Nine Network) — Ian Bradley; The Harp in the South (Network Ten) — Anthony Buckley; Vietnam (Network Ten) — Doug Mitchell, Terry Hayes, George Miller; In Between (SBS) — Chris Warner, Kim Dalton
Best Direction in a Telefeature: Jane Campion — Two Friends (ABC); James Clayden — The Hour Before My Brother Dies (ABC); Stephen Wallace — Hunger (ABC); Mark Joffe — Watch the Shadows Dance (Nine Network)	Best Direction in a Mini Series: Marcus Cole, Mark Joffe — The Great Bookie Robbery (Nine Network); Chris Thomson — The Challenge (Nine Network); George Whaley — The Harp in the South (Network Ten); John Duigan, Chris Noonan — Vietnam (Network Ten)
Best Performance by an Actor in a Telefeature: Steven Jacob — A Single Life (ABC); Shane Connor — Army Wives (Network Ten); Brendan Higgins — Hunger (ABC); Ernie Dingo — Tudawali (SBS)	Best Performance by an Actress in a Telefeature: Michele Fawdon — The Fish are Safe (ABC); Rhonda Wilson — The Hour Before My Brother Dies (ABC); Emma Coles — Two Friends (ABC); Kris McQuade — Two Friends (ABC)
Best Performance by an Actor in a Mini Series: Nicholas Eadie — Vietnam (Network Ten); John Wood — The Challenge (Nine Network); Martyn Sanderson — The Harp in the South (Network Ten); Vichea Ten — In Between (SBS)	Best Performance by an Actress in a Mini Series: Nicole Kidman — Vietnam (Network Ten); Catherine Wilkin — The Great Bookie Robbery (Nine Network); Anne Phelan — The Harp in the South (Network Ten); Tracy Mann — Sword of Honour (Seven Network)
