= AACTA Award for Best Lead Actress in a Television Drama =

Australian television award

The Australian Film Institute Award for Best Lead Actress in Television Drama is awarded annually by the Australian Film Institute as part of the awards in television for excellence in acting in television drama by an actress.

The first Award was made in 1986. Prior to 1990, two awards existed and were called Best Performance by an Actress in a Mini Series and Best Lead Actress in a Telefeature. The awards were merged in 1990 to become Best Actress in a Leading Role in a Telefeature or Mini Series which in 1991 was renamed Best Actress in a Leading Role in a Television Drama. In 2000, the Awards were again awarded in two categories, called Best Performance by an Actress in a Telefeature or Mini Series and Best Actress in a Leading Role in a Television Drama. In 2002, the Awards were again combined under the title Best Actress in a Leading Role in a Television Drama and two years later, in 2004, the Award was named Best Actress in a Leading Role in a Television Drama or Comedy. A separate comedy Award was established in 2006, and this Award became Best Lead Actress in Television Drama.

Claudia Karvan has the most nominations with 11 and the most wins with 4.

== Best Performance by an Actress in a Mini Series ==
Year	Winner	Mini Series	Network	Other nominees
1986	Deidre Rubenstein	Palace of Dreams	ABC TV	
1987	Nicole Kidman	Vietnam	Network Ten	Catherine Wilkin - The Great Bookie Robbery (Nine Network); Anne Phelan - The Harp in the South (Network Ten); Tracy Mann - Sword Of Honour (Seven Network)
1988	Anne Phelan	Poor Man's Orange	Ten Network	Tushka Bergen - Always Afternoon (ABC); Kaarin Fairfax - Poor Man's Orange (Network Ten); Victoria Longley - The Alien Years (ABC)
1989	Julia Blake	Edens Lost	ABC	Victoria Longley - Eden's Lost (ABC); Lisa Harrow - Act of Betrayal (ABC); Linda Cropper - Eden's Lost (ABC)

== Best Lead Actress in a Telefeature ==
Year	Winner	Telefeature	Network	Other nominees
1986	Candy Raymond	Breaking Up		
1987	Michele Fawdon	The Fish Are Safe	ABC	Rhonda Wilson - The Hour Before My Brother Dies (ABC); Emma Coles - Two Friends (ABC); Kris McQuade - Two Friends (ABC)
1988	Kerry McGuire	Olive	ABC	Maggie King - Sisterly Love (ABC); Judith Stratford - Custody; Joan Sydney - Sisterly Love (ABC)
1989	Pat Thomson	Malpractice		Caz Lederman - Malpractice; Grace Parr - Prejudice (Nine Network); Sonia Todd - Rescue (ABC)

== Best Actress in a Leading Role in a Telefeature or Mini Series ==
Year	Winner	Telefeature or Mini Series	Network	Other nominees
1990	Rebecca Gibney	Come In Spinner	ABC TV	Caroline Goodall - Cassidy (ABC); Lisa Harrow - Come In Spinner (ABC); Tracy Mann - How Wonderful! (ABC)

== Best Actress in a Leading Role in a Television Drama ==
Year	Winner	Television Drama	Episode	Network	Other nominees
1991	Sonia Todd	Police Rescue	"By the book"	ABC TV	Janet Andrewartha - Embassy, Season 2 - Episode 1, 'A Human Dimension' (ABC); Pat Bishop - The Paper Man (ABC); Josephine Byrnes - Shadows of the Heart (Network Ten)
1992	Lisa Hensley	Brides of Christ		ABC TV	Sandy Gore - Brides Of Christ (ABC); Leverne McDonnell - Phoenix, Season 1 - Episode 8, 'Fond Memories' (ABC); Lenita Vangellis - Six Pack - 'Loulla' (SBS)
1993	Denise Roberts	G.P.	"Alone"	ABC TV	Elizabeth Alexander - Seven Deadly Sins - 'Pride' (ABC); Elaine Hudson - Joh's Jury (ABC); Christine Tremarco - The Leaving Of Liverpool (ABC)
1994	Monica Maughan	The Damnation of Harvey McHugh	"My brilliant chorea"	ABC TV	Diana Lin - Under The Skin - Episode 5, 'The Long Ride' (SBS); Jacqueline McKenzie - The Battlers (Seven Network); Sigrid Thornton - G.P., Series 6 - Episode 13, 'Double Bind' (ABC)
1995	Jacqueline McKenzie	Halifax f.p.	"Lies of the Mind"	Nine Network	Rebecca Gibney - Halifax f.p., Series 1 - 'Lies Of The Mind' (Nine Network); Belinda McClory - Janus, Series 1 - Episode 3, 'Not On The Merits' (ABC); Frances O'Connor - Halifax f.p., Series 1 - 'The Feeding' (Nine Network)
1996	Claudia Karvan	G.P.	"Sing me a lullaby"	ABC TV	Catherine McClements - Water Rats, Series 1 - Episode 10, 'Goldstein And Son' (Nine Network); Sonia Todd - Police Rescue, Series 5 - Episode 9, 'The Only Constant' (ABC) Sonia Todd
1997	Anne Looby	Simone de Beauvoir's Babies	Episode #3	ABC TV	Sally Cooper - Simone de Beauvoir's Babies - Episode 4 (ABC); Nadine Garner - Raw FM - Episode 2, 'Desperately Seeking Su Lin' (ABC); Leah Purcell - Fallen Angels - Episode 14, 'Love Is In The Air' (ABC)
1998	Rachael Blake	Wildside	Episode #20	ABC TV	Rebecca Gibney - Halifax f.p., Series 3 - 'Afraid Of The Dark' (Nine Network); Claudia Karvan - Never Tell Me Never (Network Ten); Sophie Heathcote - Raw FM - Episode 8, 'Raw 'n Sore' (ABC)
1999	Jill Forster	SeaChange	"Manna from heaven"	ABC TV	Catherine McClements - Water Rats, Series 4 - Episode 17, 'Hi Honey I'm Home' (Nine Network); Lisa McCune - The Potato Factory (Seven Network); Sonia Todd - The Potato Factory (Seven Network)
2000	Anne Phelan	Something in the Air	"We will remember them"	ABC TV	Rhondda Findleton - Grass Roots, Series 1 - Episode 7, 'Late July, Friday 4pm To 10.30pm' (ABC); Sophie Heathcote - Grass Roots, Series 1 - Episode 8, 'The Whole Year' (ABC); Anita Hegh - Stingers, Series 2 - Episode 18, 'Men In The Dark' (Nine Network)
2001	Kerry Armstrong	SeaChange		ABC TV	Kate Beahan - Love Is a Four Letter Word (ABC); Claudia Karvan - The Secret Life of Us (Network Ten); Gina Riley - The Games (ABC); Sigrid Thornton - SeaChange (ABC)
2002	Juliet Stevenson	The Road from Coorain		ABC TV	Kerry Armstrong - MDA (Medical Defence Australia), Series 1 (ABC); Mary Docker - Halifax f.p., Series 6 - 'Takes Two' (Nine Network); Claudia Karvan - The Secret Life of Us (Network Ten)
2003	Angie Milliken	MDA		ABC TV	Claudia Karvan - The Secret Life of Us, Series 3 (Network Ten); Deborah Mailman - The Secret Life of Us, Series 3 (Network Ten); Jane Turner - Kath & Kim, Series 2 (ABC)

== Best Performance by an Actress in a Telefeature or Mini Series ==
Year	Winner	Telefeature or Mini Series	Episode	Network	Other nominees
2000	Noni Hazlehurst	Waiting at the Royal		Nine Network	Essie Davis - Halifax f.p., Series 5 - 'The Spider And The Fly' (Nine Network); Rebecca Gibney - Halifax f.p., Series 5 - 'A Person Of Interest' (Nine Network); Jo Kennedy - Waiting at the Royal (Nine Network)
2001	Angie Milliken	My Brother Jack		Network Ten	Greta Scacchi - The Farm (ABC); Ellouise Rothwell - My Brother Jack (Network Ten)

== Best Actress in a Leading Role in a Television Drama or Comedy ==
Year	Winner	Television Drama or Comedy	Episode	Network	Other nominees
2004	Bojana Novakovic	Marking Time		ABC	Claudia Karvan - Small Claims (Network Ten); Gina Riley - Kath & Kim, Series 3 (ABC); Jane Turner - Kath & Kim, Series 3 (ABC)
2005	Claudia Karvan	Love My Way		FOX8	Romola Garai - The Incredible Journey of Mary Bryant (Network Ten); Miranda Otto - Through My Eyes (Seven Network); Sigrid Thornton - Little Oberon (Nine Network)

== Best Lead Actress in Television Drama ==
Year	Winner	Television Drama	Episode	Network	Other nominees
2006	Susie Porter	RAN		SBS TV	Justine Clarke - The Surgeon (Network Ten); Claudia Karvan - Love My Way, Series 2 (Foxtel); Asher Keddie - Love My Way, Series 2 (Foxtel)
2007	Claudia Karvan	Love My Way		Showtime	Tammy Clarkson - The Circuit (SBS); Noni Hazlehurst - Stepfather Of The Bride (ABC); Catherine McClements - Call Me Mum (SBS)
2008	Kat Stewart	Underbelly		Nine Network	Phoebe Tonkin - H_{2}O: Just Add Water (Network Ten); Diana Glenn - Satisfaction (Showcase); Alison Whyte - Satisfaction (Showcase)
2009	Susie Porter	East West 101		SBS TV	Rachael Blake - False Witness (UKTV); Rebecca Gibney - Packed to the Rafters (Seven Network); Asher Keddie - Underbelly: A Tale of Two Cities (Nine Network)
2010	Catherine McClements	Tangle	Season 2	Showcase	Cheree Cassidy - Underbelly: The Golden Mile "Full Force Gale" (Nine Network); Justine Clarke - Tangle (Showcase); Poppy Lee Friar - Dead Gorgeous (ABC)
2011	Sarah Snook	Sisters of War		ABC1	Essie Davis - Cloudstreet (Showcase); Kerry Fox - Cloudstreet (Showcase); Asher Keddie - Paper Giants: The Birth of Cleo (ABC1)
2012	Leah Purcell	Redfern Now	Episode 1: Family	ABC1	Ashleigh Cummings - Puberty Blues (Network Ten); Essie Davis - Miss Fisher's Murder Mysteries (ABC1); Susie Porter - Dangerous Remedy (ABC1)
2013	Claudia Karvan	The Time of Our Lives		ABC1	Marie Bunel - An Accidental Soldier (ABC1); Asher Keddie - Offspring (Network Ten); Sheridan Smith - Mrs Biggs (Seven Network)
2014	Marta Dusseldorp	Janet King		ABC	Ashleigh Cummings - Puberty Blues, Series 2 (Network Ten); Kat Stewart - Offspring, Season 5 (Network Ten); Danielle Cormack - Wentworth, Series 2 (SoHo)
2015	Pamela Rabe	Wentworth	Series 3	SoHo	Peta Sergeant - House of Hancock (Nine Network); Sarah Snook - The Secret River (ABC); Deborah Mailman - Redfern Now - Promise Me (ABC)
2016	Elizabeth Debicki	The Kettering Incident		Foxtel/Showcase	Danielle Cormack – Wentworth (Foxtel/SoHo); Pamela Rabe – Wentworth (Foxtel/SoHo); Sarah Snook – The Beautiful Lie (ABC)
2017	Elisabeth Moss	Top of the Lake: China Girl		Foxtel/BBC First	Toni Collette – Blue Murder: Killer Cop (Seven Network); Marta Dusseldorp – Janet King (ABC); Pamela Rabe – Wentworth (Foxtel/Showcase)
2018	Kate Box	Riot			Tina Bursill – Doctor Doctor; Judy Davis – Mystery Road; Leah Purcell – Wentworth; Leeanna Walsman – Safe Harbour
2019	Deborah Mailman	Total Control			Jenna Coleman – The Cry; Essie Davis – Lambs of God; Ann Dowd – Lambs of God; Anna Torv – Secret City: Under the Eagle
2020	Yvonne Strahovski	Stateless			Jada Alberts – Mystery Road; Rebecca Gibney – Halifax: Retribution; Asher Keddie – Stateless; Pamela Rabe – Wentworth
2021	Anna Torv	The Newsreader			Deborah Mailman – Total Control; Mandy McElhinney – Wentworth; Miranda Otto – Fire; Pamela Rabe – Wentworth
2022	Tuuli Narkle	Mystery Road: Origin			Isla Fisher – Wolf Like Me; Claudia Karvan – Bump; Kate Mulvany – The Twelve; Bojana Novakovic – Love Me

== See also ==
- Australian Film Institute
- AFI Awards
- Australian Film Institute Television Awards
