= 1985 Australian Film Institute Awards =

Australian film and television award ceremony

27th Australian Film Institute Awards
- Date: 14 September 1985

Highlights
- Best Film: Bliss

The 27th Australian Film Institute Awards were awards held by the Australian Film Institute to celebrate the best of Australian films of 1985.

== Feature film ==
Best Film: Bliss – Anthony Buckley; A Street to Die – Bill Bennett; Fran – David Rapsey; Unfinished Business – Rebel Penfold-Russell	Best Direction: Ray Lawrence – Bliss; Bill Bennett – A Street to Die; Glenda Hambly – Fran; Bob Ellis – Unfinished Business
Best Lead Actor: Chris Haywood – A Street to Die; Richard Moir – An Indecent Obsession; Barry Otto – Bliss; John Clayton – Unfinished Business	Best Lead Actress: Noni Hazlehurst – Fran; Lynette Curran – Bliss; Debbie Byrne – Rebel; Michele Fawdon – Unfinished Business
Best Supporting Actor: Nique Needles – The Boy Who Had Everything; Mark Little – An Indecent Obsession; Jon Ewing – Bliss; Bryan Brown – Rebel	Best Supporting Actress: Annie Byron – Fran; Kerry Walker – Bliss; Genevieve Mooy – Emoh Ruo; Narelle Simpson – Fran
Best Original Screenplay: Glenda Hambly – Fran; Bill Bennett – A Street to Die; Stephen Wallace – The Boy Who Had Everything; Bob Ellis – Unfinished Business	Best Adapted Screenplay: Peter Carey, Ray Lawrence – Bliss; Denise Morgan – An Indecent Obsession; Michael Jenkins, Bob Herbert – Rebel; Frank Moorhouse – The Coca-Cola Kid
Best Cinematography: Peter James – Rebel; Paul Murphy – Bliss; Dean Semler – The Coca-Cola Kid; Ray Argall – Wrong World	Best Editing: Brian Kavanagh – Frog Dreaming; Wayne LeClos – Bliss; Michael Honey – Rebel; John Scott – The Coca-Cola Kid
Best Original Music Score: Ray Cook, Chris Neal, Peter Best, Billy Byers, Bruce Rowland – Rebel; Peter Best – Bliss; Brian May – Frog Dreaming; William Motzing, Tim Finn – The Coca-Cola Kid	Best Sound: Mark Lewis, Penn Robinson, Julian Ellingworth, Jim Taig – Rebel; Dean Gawen, Peter Fenton, Phil Heywood, Gary Wilkins, Helen Brown, Ron Purvis – Bliss; Mark Lewis, Craig Carter, Ken Sallows, Tim Chau, Rex Watts, Roger Savage – Frog Dreaming; Mark Lewis, Gethin Creagh, Martin Oswin, Dean Gawen, Helen Brown – The Coca-Cola Kid
Best Production Design: Brian Thomson – Rebel; Owen Paterson, Wendy Dickson – Bliss; Jon Dowding – Frog Dreaming; Graham Walker – The Coca-Cola Kid	Best Costume Design: Roger Kirk – Rebel; Helen Hooper – Bliss; Ross Major – The Boy Who Had Everything; Terry Ryan – The Coca-Cola Kid

== Non-feature film ==
Best Documentary Film: Raoul Wallenberg: Between the Lines – Bob Weis; Collum Calling Canberra – David MacDougall, Judith MacDougall, Australian Institute of Aboriginal Studies; I'll Be Home for Christmas – Brian McKenzie; Munda Nyuringu: He's Taken the Land, He Believes it is His, He Won't Give it Back – Robert Bropho, Jan Roberts	Best Sponsored Documentary: Timber Craft (Artisans of Australia) – Pamela Paddon; Women of Utopia – Elisabeth Knight; Image Makers – Ursula Kolbe
