= AACTA Award for Best Miniseries or Telefeature =

Australian television award

The AACTA Award for Best Miniseries or Telefeature, also known as AACTA Award for Best Telefeature or Mini Series, is an award that has been handed out to producers annually since 1986 by the Australian Film Institute (AFI), since 2011 the Australian Academy of Cinema and Television Arts (AACTA).

== History ==
The award was originally presented by the AFI in two separate categories, for "Best Telefeature" and "Best Mini Series", but in 1990 both categories were merged to form Best Television Mini Series or Telefeature. By 2008 the award name was changed again, to AFI Award for Best Telefeature, Mini Series or Short Run Series.

From the inaugural AACTA awards in 2011 until 2020, the name was AACTA Award for Best Telefeature or Mini Series, changing to AACTA Award for Best Miniseries or Telefeature in 2021.

== Best Mini Series ==
Year	Winner	Recipient(s)	Network	Other nominees
1986	The Dunera Boys	Bob Weis	Network Ten	?
1987	The Great Bookie Robbery	Ian Bradley	Network Ten	The Harp in the South (Network Ten) Anthony Buckley; Vietnam (Network Ten) Doug Mitchell, Terry Hayes, George Miller; In Between (SBS) Chris Warner, Kim Dalton
1988	The True Believers	Sandra Levy & Matt Carroll	ABC TV	The Alien Years (ABC) Ray Alchin; Captain James Cook (ABC) Ray Alchin; Poor Man's Orange (Network Ten) Anthony Buckley
1989	Edens Lost	Margaret Fink	ABC TV	Act of Betrayal (ABC) Ray Alchin, Nick Evans; Bodysurfer (ABC) Ross Matthews; Barlow & Chambers: A Long Way From Home (Nine Network) Matt Carroll, Steve Krantz

== Best Telefeature ==
Year	Winner	Recipient(s)	Network	Other nominees
1986	The Perfectionist	Pat Lovell	Network Ten	?
1987	Two Friends	Jan Chapman	ABC TV	Call Me Mr. Brown (Network Ten) Scott Hicks, Terry Jennings; Hunger (ABC) Jan Chapman; The Hour Before My Brother Dies (ABC) Noel Price
1988	A Matter of Convenience	Noel Price	ABC TV	Fragments Of War (Network Ten) Terry Hayes, Doug Mitchell, George Miller; Olive (ABC) Richard Brennan; Sisterly Love (ABC) Peter Du Cane
1989	Police State	Rod Allan	Southern Star Sullivan/ABC TV	Prejudice (Nine Network) Pamela Williams; Rescue (ABC) John Edwards; Malpractice Tristram Miall

== Best Miniseries or Telefeature (or Short Run Series) ==
Year	Winner	Recipient(s)	Network	Other nominees
1990	Come In Spinner	Jan Chapman	ABC TV	The Girl from Tomorrow (Nine Network) Ron Saunders, Noel Price; Police Crop (ABC) Rod Allan; The Magistrate (ABC) Kim Dalton, Chris Warner
1991	The Paper Man	Sue Masters; Greg Ricketson	ABC TV	Ratbag Hero (Seven Network) Zelda Rosenbaum, Oscar Whitbread; Ring of Scorpio (Nine Network) Errol Sullivan; Shadows of the Heart (Network Ten) Jan Marnell
1992	Brides of Christ	Sue Masters	ABC TV	Clowning Around (ABC) Paul D. Barron, Antonia Barnard; Six Pack – 'Piccolo Mondo' (SBS) Bob Weis; The Girl from Tomorrow: Tomorrow's End (Nine Network) Noel Price
1993	The Leaving of Liverpool	Steve Knapman	ABC TV	Seven Deadly Sins – 'Sloth' (ABC) Hannie Rayson; Round the Twist, Series 2 – Episode 3, 'Little Squirt' (ABC) Paul Jennings, Esben Storm; Police Rescue, Series 3 – Episode 1, 'Lifeline' (ABC) Debra Oswald
1994	Under the Skin: The Long Ride	Franco di Chiera	SBS	The Battlers (Seven Network) Gus Howard; Under the Skin, Episode 'Grandma's Teeth' (SBS) Franco di Chiera; Seventh Floor (Network Ten) John Sexton
1995	Halifax f.p.: The Feeding	Roger Le Mesurier; Roger Simpson		Cody – 'A Family Affair' (Seven Network) Sandra Levy, John Edwards; Halifax f.p. – 'Hard Corps' (Nine Network) Roger Le Mesurier, Roger Simpson; Halifax f.p. – 'Lies of the Mind' (Nine Network) Roger Le Mesurier, Roger Simpson
1996	Blue Murder	Rod Allan	ABC TV	Halifax f.p. – 'Cradle and All' (Nine Network) Roger Simpson, Roger Le Mesurier; Naked – Episode 'The Fisherman's Wake' (ABC) Jan Chapman; State Coroner (Network Ten) – David Taft, John Kearney
1997	Good Guys, Bad Guys	Roger Le Mesurier; Roger Simpson; Ros Tatarka	Nine Network	Kangaroo Palace – (Seven Network) Ewan Burnett; Simone De Beauvoir's Babies (ABC) – Andrew Knight, Denise Patience, Deborah Cox; The Last of the Ryans (Nine Network) – Richard Brennan
1998	Wildside	Steve Knapman	ABC TV	The Violent Earth – Jock Blair, David Rouse, Bruce Gordon; Halifax f.p.: Afraid of the Dark –Roger Le Mesurier, Roger Simpson, Terry Jennings; Never Tell Me Never – David Elfick, Anne Bruning
1999	The Day of the Roses	Simone North; Tony Cavanaugh		The Potato Factory – Anthony Buckley, Des Monaghan; Aftershocks – Julia Overton; Halifax f.p.: Swimming with Sharks – Roger Le Mesurier, Roger Simpson, Robyn Sinclair
2000	On the Beach	John Edwards; Errol Sullivan; Jeff Hayes; Greg Coote	Southern Star Sullivan; ABC TV	Halifax f.p.: A Person of Interest – Roger Le Mesurier, Roger Simpson, John Hugginson; The Secret Life of Us – John Edwards, Amanda Higgs; Waiting at the Royal – Andrew Wiseman, Richard Keddie
2001	My Brother Jack	Sue Milliken; Andrew Wiseman; Richard Keddie	ABC TV	Changi – Bill Hughes; Do or Die – John Edwards, Lavinia Warner; My Husband, My Killer – David Gould, Des Monaghan, Anthony Buckley
2002	The Road from Coorain	Penny Chapman		Halifax f.p.: Takes Two – Roger Le Mesurier, Roger Simpson, Steve Jodrell; Heroes' Mountain – Anthony Buckley; Secret Bridesmaids' Business – Lynda House
2003	After the Deluge	Richard Keddie; Andrew Knight; Andrew Wiseman		BlackJack – Nick Murray, Sally Ayre-Smith; The Postcard Bandit – Matt Carroll; The Shark Net – Sue Taylor
2004	Marking Time	John Edwards	ABC TV	Go Big – Ellie Beaumont, Rosemary Blight, Michael Miller; Small Claims – Rosemary Blight, Kylie Du Fresne, Ben Grant; The Brush-Off – Huntaway Films & Ruby Entertainment
2005	The Incredible Journey of Mary Bryant	Andrew Benson; Greg Haddrick	Network Ten	Little Oberon – Susan Bower; Hell Has Harbour Views – Ian Collie; Through My Eyes – Simone North, Tony Cavanaugh
2006	RAN	Penny Chapman	SBS TV	Answered by Fire – Roger Le Mesurier & Andrew Walker; The Silence – Jan Chapman; The Surgeon – John Edwards & Judi McCrossin
2007	The King	Jason Stephens	TV1 / Nine Network	Bastard Boys – Brett Popplewell & Ray Quint; The Circuit – Ross Hutchens & Colin South
2008	East West 101	Steve Knapman; Kris Wyld	SBS TV	Bed of Roses – Stephen Luby & Mark Ruse; Rain Shadow – Gus Howard; Valentine's Day – Tony Wright
2009	False Witness	Greg Haddrick; Peter Andrikidis	UKTV	3 Acts of Murder – Sue Taylor; The Last Confession of Alexander Pearce – Nial Fulton; Saved – Michael McMahon, Tony Ayres
2010	Hawke	Richard Keddie	Network Ten	A Model Daughter: The Killing of Caroline Byrne – Karl Zwicky (Network Ten)
2011	The Slap	Tony Ayres, Helen Bowden, Michael McMahon	ABC1	Cloudstreet – Greg Haddrick and Brenda Pam (Showcase); Paper Giants: The Birth of Cleo – John Edwards and Karen Radzyner (ABC1); Sisters of War – Andrew Wiseman (ABC1)
2012	Howzat! Kerry Packer's War	John Edwards, Mimi Butler	Nine Network	Beaconsfield – John Edwards, Jane Liscombe (Nine Network); Devil's Dust – Antonia Barnard, Stephen Corvini (ABC1); Underground: The Julian Assange Story – Helen Bowden (Network Ten)
2013	Top of the Lake	Emile Sherman, Iain Canning, Jane Campion, Philippa Campbell	BBC UKTV	An Accidental Soldier – Kylie du Fresne, Sue Taylor (ABC1); Mrs Biggs – Kwadjo Dajan, Tony Wright (Seven Network); Power Games: The Packer-Murdoch War – John Edwards, Jodi Matterson (Nine Network)
2014	Devil's Playground	Helen Bowden, Penny Chapman, and Blake Ayshford	Foxtel-Showcase	Carlotta – Riccardo Pellizzeri and Lara Radulovich (ABC); INXS: Never Tear Us Apart – Mark Fennessy, Rory Callaghan, Kerrie Mainwaring, and Andrew Prowse (Seven Network); Secrets & Lies – Tracey Robertson, Leigh McGrath, and Nathan Mayfield (Network Ten)
2015	Peter Allen: Not the Boy Next Door	Kerrie Mainwaring, Rory Callaghan	Seven Network	Banished – Sita Williams, Emile Sherman, Iain Canning, Jamie Laurenson, Brett Popplewell (BBC First); The Principal – Ian Collie (SBS); The Secret River – Stephen Luby (ABC)
2016	The Kettering Incident	Vincent Sheehan, Victoria Madden, Andrew Walker	Foxtel-Showcase	Barracuda – Tony Ayres, Amanda Higgs (ABC); The Beautiful Lie – John Edwards S.P.A, Imogen Banks S.P.A (ABC); Molly – John Molloy (Seven Network)
2017	Sunshine	Ian Collie, Anna McLeish, Sarah Shaw	SBS TV	Blue Murder: Killer Cop – Carol Hughes, Michael Jenkins (Seven Network); Seven Types of Ambiguity – Amanda Higgs, Tony Ayres, Jacqueline Perske (ABC); Wake in Fright – Helen Bowden, Kristian Moliere (Network Ten)
2018	Riot	Joanna Werner, Louise Smith	ABC1	Dead Lucky – Ellie Beaumont, Drew Proffitt, Diane Haddon (SBS); Friday On My Mind – David Taylor, David Maher, Diane Haddon, Christopher Lee (ABC); Picnic At Hanging Rock – Jo Porter, Brett Popplewell (Foxtel); Safe Harbour – Stephen Corvini, Debbie Lee (SBS)
2019	Lambs of God	Jason Stephens, Helen Bowden, Sarah Lambert, Elisa Argenzio	Foxtel-Showcase	The Cry – Claire Mundell, Brian Kaczynski, Stuart Menzies (ABC); Fighting Season – Kylie du Fresne, Blake Ayshford, Elisa Argenzio (Foxtel); The Hunting – Sophie Hyde, Lisa Scott, Rebecca Summerton (SBS); On the Ropes – Helen Bowden, Courtney Wise, Jason Stephens (SBS)
2020	Stateless	Cate Blanchett, Elise McCredie, Tony Ayres, Sheila Jayadev, Paul Ranford, Liz Watts, Andrew Upton	ABC	The Gloaming – Victoria Madden, John Molloy, Fiona McConaghy (Stan); Hungry Ghosts – Stephen Corvini, Timothy Hobart, Debbie Lee, Sue Masters (SBS); Operation Buffalo – Vincent Sheehan, Tanya Phegan, Peter Duncan (ABC); The Secrets She Keeps – Helen Bowden, Jason Stephens, Paul Watters (Network Ten)

== See also ==
- Australian Film Institute
- AFI Awards
- AFI Television Awardsf
