= With Time to Kill =

- Directed by: James Clayden
- Written by: James Clayden
- Produced by: James Clayden
- Starring: James Clayden; Ian Scott
- Cinematography: Laurie McInnes
- Edited by: Gary Hillberg
- Music by: Chris Knowles
- Release date: June 1987
- Country: Australia
- Language: English

With Time to Kill is a 1987 Australian film directed by James Clayden. It screened at the 1987 Melbourne International Film Festival.

It was filmed in 1985 and Clayden cut a ten minute trailer to try get presales to fund the films post production.

== Synopsis ==
Two cops decide to start assassinating known criminals.

== Reception ==
Critic Adrian Martin wrote "With Time to Kill is not an easy or even particularly pleasurable film to watch, but it is a subversive oddity now lurking in many a video shop, and for that reason (at least) it demands a special footnote in Australian film history." The Age's Buffs' choice column writes "Clayden's experiment is not entirely successful: it lacks Godardian joy in the game it's playing, and irony sometimes lapses into parody, due to flawed exposition of the story line and faltering performances. There is a leson here for all radical film-makers: you have to master the conventions before you can subvert them successfully."

== Cast ==
- Ian Scott as Lieutenant Nick Yates
- Elizabeth Huntley as Louise Yates
- Jan Friedel as Voice
- James Clayden as Sergeant Max Clements
- John Howard as Adam Sayer
- Lin Van Hek as Janet Golding
- Peter Green as The Laundryman
- Barry Dickins as Terry Bendix
- Tim Robertson as Jack Keane
- Stephen Cummings as Tony Shaw
- Val Kirwan as Clairvoyant
- Phil Motherwell as Frank Williams
- Marie Hoy as Sarah Davis
- Sarah Mogridge as Voice
- Lorender Freeman as Martin Ludlow
- Peaches La Creme as Victoria Clements
- David Brown as Brendon Golding
- Rhonda Wilson as Actress (rehearsing)
- Richard Lee as Lenny Loyd
- Joe Dolce as Frank Isaccs
- Nigel Buesst as Wilson Manning
- Neill Gladwin as Andrew Bryce
- Colin Talbot as Voice
