= Maureen McCarthy =

Australian author

Maureen McCarthy (born 1953) is an Australian author.

McCarthy grew up on a farm in Homewood, Victoria, and was initially an art teacher in Victorian secondary schools before transitioning into film. She partnered with Chris Warner to start Trout Films, and produced films such as Eating Your Heart Out, a documentary about eating disorders.

She co-wrote In Between, a TV drama series for SBS, before adapting it into books. McCarthy continued to write for TV series such as Ocean Girl and Lift Off.

Her books focus on young adults and have been shortlisted for numerous awards. Her novel Queen Kat, Carmel and St Jude Get a Life was published in 1995 and adapted into TV series for ABC TV. The series was produced by her husband, Chris Warner.

== Bibliography ==
- Stay With Me (2015)
- The Convent (2012)
- When You Wish upon a Rat (2012)
- Careful What You Wish for (2010)
- Somebody's Crying (2008)
- Rose By Any Other Name (2006)
- When You Wake and Find Me Gone (2002)
- Flash Jack (2001)
- Chain Of Hearts (1999)
- Passion (1999)
- Queen Kat, Carmel and St Jude Get a Life (1995)
- Treasure of Cala Figuera (1993)
- Polish Pony Puzzle (1993)
- Mona Lisa Mix-up (1993)
- Flight of the Golden Goose (1993)
- Falling Star (1993)
- Eagles from the East (1993)
- Cross My Heart (1993)
- Ganglands (1992)

== Filmography ==
As writer

- Ocean Girl (1997)
- In Between (1987)
- Afterward (1984)
- Eating Your Heart Out (1984)
- Skipping Class (1983)
- Working Up (1980)

== Awards ==
- 1987 Australian Film Institute Awards - Best Original Screenplay - In Between - Winner
- 1980 Chicago International Film Festival - Certificate of Merit, Best Documentary Working Up - Winner
