= Diana Lin =

Chinese Australian actress (born 1962)

- 林晓杰
- Born: 1962 (age 63–64); Harbin, Heilongjiang, China
- Education: Shanghai Theatre Academy
- Occupation: Actress
- Years active: 1984–1996; 2016–present

Chinese name
- Traditional Chinese: 林曉傑
- Simplified Chinese: 林晓杰
Transcriptions
Standard Mandarin
- Hanyu Pinyin: Lín Xiǎojié

Diana Lin (also called Xiaojie Lin) is a Chinese Australian actress.

== Early life ==
Lin began her career in China, where from the age of 14, she started training for the Chinese Beijing Opera Company as a singer, before going to Shanghai and taking up acting with the city's Theatre Academy.

== Career ==
Lin began taking on film roles such as Shang Jie with the Pearl River Film Studio in Guangzhou. She then migrated to Australia in the early 1990s, basing herself in Sydney. Her first featured Australian role was in the fifth episode of 1993's anthology TV series Under the Skin. For her performance in Under the Skin she was nominated for the 1994 AFI Award for Best Actress in a Leading Role in a Television Drama.

Soon thereafter, Lin took a long hiatus from acting due to the lack of good Asian roles available. She made her return to acting in six-part comedy series The Family Law. She then went on to land a major role in the 2019 American film The Farewell.

== Filmography ==
=== Film ===
Year	English title	Chinese title	Role	Notes	Ref.
1984	Many Ways to the Life	人生没有单行道	Ye Jun		
1986	Country Folk	乡民	Bai Yin		
1987		幸福不是毛毛雨	Xu Mingzhu		
1988	Cops and Desperados	风流警察亡命匪	Mei Rong		
1988	A Cop and a Sleuth	警官与侦探	Yi Qifang		
1989	Women's Story	女人的故事	Pregnant Woman		
1989		痴梦惊魂	Wu Xiuying		
1989	Business Circles	商界	Liang Yiyun		
2017	Australia Day		Madam		
2018	Piano Mums	钢琴虎妈	Xiaohu Wen		
2019	The Farewell	别告诉她	Jian		
2020	Lonely Blue Night	蓝色的姑娘	Mother		
2023	The Portable Door	便携门	Mrs. Dao		
2024	Big World	小小的我	Chen Suqun		

=== Television series ===
Year	English title	Chinese title	Role	Notes	Ref.
1991		花落台北			
1993	Under the Skin			1 episode	
1996	Naked: Stories of Men		Sue	1 episode	
2016-2019	The Family Law		Maisy	11 episodes	
2019	The InBESTigators		Nana	1 episode	
2023	The Ordinary Road	平凡之路	Mama Zhu		
2023	The Long Season	漫长的季节	Luo Meisu		
2024	Interior Chinatown		Lily Wu		

== Awards and nominations ==
Year	Award	Category	Nominated work	Results	Ref.
1988	Hundred Flowers Awards	Best Supporting Actress	Women's Story	Nominated	
1994	Australian Film Institute	Best Actress in a Leading Role in a Television Drama	Under the Skin	Nominated	
2018	Equity Ensemble Awards	Outstanding Performance by an Ensemble in a Comedy Series	The Family Law	Won	
2021	CinEuphoria Awards	Best Ensemble – International Competition	The Farewell	Nominated	
2024	Television Series of China Quality Ceremony	Jury Award – Ingenious Performance Actor of the Year	The Long Season	Won	
