= Daniel Keene =

Australian playwright (born 1955)

- Born: Daniel Keene; 1955 (age 70–71); Melbourne, Australia
- Occupations: dramatist and theatre director
- Writing career
- Language: English
- Notable work: Tom White

Daniel Keene (born 1955) is an Australian playwright whose work has been performed throughout the world.

== Career ==
Keene's plays have been performed in Australia, France, Poland and the United States. Many of his plays have been published in French translation.

He cofounded Tide Theatre in 1979 with Rhonda Wilson. He was also a co-founder, with Ariette Taylor, of the Keene/Taylor Theatre Project.

== Awards ==
With Ariette Taylor, Keene won the award for Outstanding Contribution to Theatre (Green Room Awards, 1998) and the Kenneth Myer Medallion for the Performing Arts.

He is the winner of a number of drama awards in Australia, and the 2002 production of his play Terminus, directed by Laurent Laffargue at the TNT in Toulouse and the Théâtre de la Ville in Paris, won the Prix Pierre Jean Jacques Gaultier for best direction.

Other awards include:

- 1989: Victorian Premier's Literary Awards — Louis Esson Prize for Drama for Silent Partner
- 1996: Wal Cherry Play of the Year Award for Best Unproduced Play for Beneath Heaven
- 1996: Festival Awards for Literature (SA) — Jill Blewett Playwright's Award for Because You are Mine
- 1998: Victorian Premier's Literary Awards — Louis Esson Prize for Drama for Every Minute, Every Hour, Every Day: Five Plays
- 2000: New South Wales Premier's Literary Awards — Nick Enright Prize for Playwriting for Scissors, Paper, Rock
- 2003: New South Wales Premier's Literary Awards — Nick Enright Prize for Playwriting for Half and Half
- 2004: Film Critics Circle of Australia — Best Original Screenplay for Tom White
- 2009: New South Wales Premier's Literary Awards — Nick Enright Prize for Playwriting for The Serpent's Teeth: Two Plays
- 2011: Queensland Premier's Literary Awards — Best Drama Script (Stage) for Life Without Me

== Selected works ==
=== Drama ===
- All Souls (1993)
- Une heure avant la mort de mon frere (1995)
- Little City (1996)
- Silence Complice / Terminus (1999)
- To Whom It May Concern: And Other Plays (2000)
- Avis aux Interesses (2000)
- Pieces Courtes (2001)
- Half and Half (2002)
- La Marche de l'Architecte / Les Paroles (2002)
- Cinq Hommes / Moitie-Moitie (2003)
- Terminus and Other Plays (2003)
- Paradise: Codes Inconnus 1 (2004)
- The Nightwatchman (2005)
- The Serpent's Teeth: 2 Plays (2008)
- The Cove: 8 Short Works (2009) eight short plays presented by If Theatre and directed by Matt Scholten. Plays included Cafe Table, Somewhere in the Middle of the Night, To Whom It May Concern, A Glass of Twilight, The Morning After, A Death, Two Shanks and The First Train.
- Life Without Me (2010)
- Boxman (2011)
- Photographs of A
- The Long Way Home (2014)
- Mother (2015)

=== Television scripts ===
- The Hour Before My Brother Dies (1986)

=== Film scripts ===
- Silent Partner (2001)
- Tom White (2004)
- Em4Jay (2006)
