= I Live with Me Dad =

- Written by: Paul Moloney
- Directed by: Paul Moloney
- Starring: Peter Hehir; Haydon Samuels; Rebecca Gibney; Peter Cummins
- Country of origin: Australia
- Original language: English

Production
- Producer: Ross Jennings
- Running time: 90 minutes
- Production company: Crawfords Australia

Original release
- Network: Nine Network
- Release: 1985

I Live with Me Dad is a 1985 TV movie, produced by Crawfords Australia. The film is about six-year-old Crispy who lives with his destitute father Sid (Hehir). Based on a true story, it follows the street adventures of a father and son and his unconventional upbringing. A heart warming film that explores the extraordinary bond between a father and his son, amidst the pressures and emotions of those who would separate them.

== Plot ==
Sid McCall is down on his luck. His greatest friend is his son Crispy and together they share all the joys and disappointments that street life can bring. Although only 6 years old, Crispy mixes easily with the street people, who share a common fellowship that always unites them during times of trouble.

== Cast ==
- Peter Hehir as Sid
- Haydon Samuels as Crispy
- Rebecca Gibney as Jill Harkness
- Peter Cummins as Sergeant
- Tommy Dysart as Griffin
- Nigel Bradshaw as Mr Ross
- Dennis Miller as Joe Kazzinak
- Fiona Corke as Nursing Sister
- Gus Mercurio as Waldo Skrimm
- Esben Storm as Blindman

== Production ==
It was based on a true story.

== Reception ==
Sian Powell of the Sydney Morning Herald concludes "It reeks of sentimentality, but there are redeeming features. The adult acting is patchy, but young Haydon Samuel turns in a solid performance as the seven-year-old son of the alcoholic battler. Paul Kelly's music is superb, as always." Reviewing the video release Graham Cooke wrote in The Canberra Times "The pair fall foul of the welfare serrvices and it is here that the film loses its way a little. Rebecca Gibney as Jill Harkness is a social worker out of another, less-enlightened age, mounting a virtual crusade to separate father from son. It gives the story a harder edge, at the same time making it seem more than a little contrived." In a capsual review Doug Anderson of the Sydney Morning Herald says "It's a two-hankie job with golden redemption at the end but quite agreeable."
