= In Between (miniseries) =

- Written by: Shane Brennan; Maureen McCarthy
- Directed by: Chris Warner; Mandy Smith
- Starring: Fatina Uygun; Vichea Ten; Sheryl Munks; Jim Petrovski
- Country of origin: Australia
- Original language: English
- No. of episodes: 4 x 1 hour

Production
- Producers: Chris Warner; Kim Dalton

Original release
- Network: SBS
- Release: 8 March – 29 March 1987

In Between is a 1987 Australian four-episode miniseries, with each episode focused on one of the four main characters.

== Synopsis ==
Four adolescents from Turkish, Cambodian, Macedonian and Ango-Australian backgrounds, face various pressures and conflicts as they enter adulthood, growing up in a multicultural society.

== Cast ==
- Fatima Ugyan as Fatima
- Vichea Ten as Saret
- Sheryl Munks as Angie
- Jim Petrovski as Alex
- Ly Lackhenamak as Kanya
- Lupco Talevski as Tome
- Maggie Millar as Bet
- Ferida Sari as Sembra
- Brahim Ozhan as Atila
- Peter Hosking as Teacher

== Production ==
The series was written by Maureen McCarthy and Shane Brennan, directed by Chris Warner and Mandy Smith and produced by Warner and Kim Dalton. The cast was mostly amateurs from the communities represented, with only one of the four main actors having any acting experience.

Four tie-in books were released, each based on one of the main characters.

== Broadcast ==
The series aired on SBS, beginning on 8 March 1987, with episodes showing weekly until 28 March.

== Reception ==
Barbara Hooks of The Age wrote: "In Between is not to be missed. I was knocked out by it. If you do not have a UHF aerial, beg, borrow or steal one." The Age's Garrie Hutchinson said: "The realistic look, and relatively unstructured approach lends In Between the authenticity of a documentary with some of the emotional impact of a drama." The Age's Dennis Pryor said: "Let us say straight away that this is an important piece of work. It helps us as we try to come to terms with migration and to sift out the propaganda from the pompous jargon which packages such vogue words as "ethnicity" and "multiculturalism"." Also in The Age, Jane Sullivan called it "an intelligent, compassionate and entertaining attempt to show what is happening around us." Richard Coleman in The Sydney Morning Herald stated: "In Between is an unusual mini-series about a common aspect of Australian life not often presented on television. For this reason alone it deserves a decent audience."

== Awards ==
Year	Award	Category	Result	Ref
1986	Chicago International Film Festival	Gold Plaque for Best TV Miniseries	Won	
1987	Australian Film Institute Awards	Best Mini-Series Screenplay (Maureen McCarthy, Shane Brennan)	Won	
1987	Australian Film Institute Awards	Best Miniseries or Telefeature (Chris Warner, Kim Dalton)	Nominated	
1987	Australian Film Institute Awards	Best Performance by an Actor in a Leading Role in a Miniseries (Vichea Ten)	Nominated	
