= Unfinished Business (1985 Australian film) =

- Directed by: Bob Ellis
- Written by: Bob Ellis
- Produced by: Rebel Penfold-Russell
- Starring: John Clayton; Michele Fawdon; Norman Kaye
- Cinematography: Andrew Lesnie
- Edited by: Amanda Robson
- Distributed by: Filmtrust Motion Picture Licensing, Inc.
- Release date: 1985
- Running time: 78 min.
- Country: Australia
- Language: English
- Budget: AU$102,000

Unfinished Business is a 1985 Australian film directed by Bob Ellis and starring John Clayton, Michele Fawdon, and Norman Kaye. Unfinished Business was nominated for five AFI Awards.

== Plot ==
Geoff, a journalist in his mid 40s, returns to Australia from 15 years abroad, leaving behind him in the US a failed marriage and three children. He meets Maureen, the girl he was in love with when he left Australia. She is married to an older man, George, who she loves but have no children. Maureen - who once fell pregnant but had an abortion - tells Geoff her husband is sterile and asks for him to impregnate her.

A year later, Geoff meets Maureen and her baby.

== Cast ==
- John Clayton as Geoff
- Michelle Fawdon as Maureen
- Norman Kaye as George

== Production ==
=== Development ===
Bob Ellis originally wanted to make a film in the style of My Dinner with Andre starring Patrick Cook and John Clarke called Business Lunch. Clarke would play an ABC executive about to tell Cook he was going to be fired and dialogue would be largely improvised. $60,000 was raised by Patric Juillet and Rebel Penfold-Russell to make the film but then Clarke became unavailable.

"Cook was ready and willing to go whenever we were but Clarke was impossible to pin down and so the whole thing lost momentum," said Ellis. "We had to spend the money so the producer, Rebel Penfold Russell, asked me to come up with another small idea with "business" in the title. The result was Unfinished Business. We had to raise a little more money to cover it because you've no idea how hard it is to come up with a small idea. Big ideas are far easier to get. I'm the greatest writer of unmade epics in the business."

Ellis wrote a script in three days (spread over three weeks) and constructed roles specifically for John Clayton and Michelle Fawdon. Ellis' wife Anne Brooksbank participated at rehearsals and contributed to the script.

Ellis says the film was based on a personal experience. "Twice in my life I've had girls ask me to oblige them in that way. And both times I've said yes. And both times they failed to turn up and go through with it. The frustrating stop-start love-making Geoff and Maureen indulge in as they go about graphing his sperm count and her temperature to maximise their chances of conceiving is also something I've been through. When Anne and I were trying to have our third child she'd kick me awake at four in the morning saying her temperature was up and I'd have to reorganise my protoplasm to suit the occasion."

=== Shooting ===
The film was rehearsed and shot in eleven days at three locations - Ellis' houses in Wahroonga and Palm Beach and his flat in Bellevue Hill.

Cast member Norman Kaye also wrote and performed the music. Ellis:

It's one of the most enjoyable experiences I ever had. Although the actor and the actress were both acting on stage - one was rehearsing in the daytime and the other was performing at night. The net result was that we'd sometimes converge at midnight and begin shooting, which is about the worst thing you can do. But it was wonderful. It took 11 days and I wish it had taken 13. We would have got some more close-ups. But it was written in three days and the time between the beginning of the writing and the world premiere was three and a quarter months, which may be a world record. I've always been very fond of it, particularly that lovely kind of marriage with those two gumnut babies, Michelle Fawdon and John Clayton. They have this marsupial, cuddly quality. Neither of them are particularly good-looking but they're very warm and, therefore, the effect, I think and believe, was very sexy and very sad. It was also to some extent a self-indulgence. I always loved Peter Dawson singing 'I'll Walk Beside You.' So it was just a happy convergence of preferences arrived at very suddenly under a whole lot of pressure, which is often the best way to work - as a lot of people will tell you, including the makers of Casablanca.

== Reception ==
The film screened at a number of festivals including the 1986 Sundance Film Festival and 1986 Melbourne International Film Festival. It was reviewed by Vincent Canby in The New York Times.

The film was later picked up for distribution by Filmtrust Motion Picture Licensing in Los Angeles.

It had a short run in cinemas in Sydney and Melbourne and sold to Channel 0-28.

=== Critical ===
According to David Stratton "Under the circumstancs [of production], it is a miracle that the film works as well as it does. Ellis is convinced that his casting choices were all-important. ... [it] is filled with humour and optimism."

=== Awards ===
The film was nominated for five AFI Awards including best film, best script and best director.
