= Corpse (film) =

- Directed by: James Clayden
- Written by: James Clayden
- Produced by: James Clayden
- Narrated by: Ian Scott
- Cinematography: James Clayden
- Edited by: James Clayden
- Music by: Chris Knowles
- Release date: June 1982
- Running time: 111 minutes
- Country: Australia
- Language: English
- Budget: $24,000

Corpse is a 1982 Australian film created by James Clayden. The film has no narrative and it "explored a secret garden of gothic imagery and alienation in landscape." Geoff Gardner wrote in Australian film, 1978-1992: a survey of theatrical features "Watching this film, all two hours of it, is not the easiest experience and its rewards and virtues are modest. Nevertheless, it remains a work of interest and, in the context of the small amount of genuine experimental film-making done in this country, it remains a key work of its time." Alex Gerbaz wrote in the NFSA Journal "Epic and beautifully photographed, this hypnotic film has been compared with the work of Andrei Tarkovsky and Werner Herzog, particularly the latter’s Nosferatu (1979)." Malachy Lewsi of RMITV said "Corpse organically evolves throughout the film–mostly in a tonal sense–you feel from the ever-changing imagery, music, and manner in which they are cut together that the film goes through an emotional shift from start to finish." It showed at the Melbourne International Film Festival in 1982.
