= Peter Hehir =

Australian actor (born 1949)

- Born: Brisbane, Queensland, Australia
- Occupation: Actor
- Years active: 1973–1998
- Known for: The Sullivans (TV series) as Bert Duggan

Peter Hehir is an Australian former actor. He had a couple of theatre roles in 1973 and one in 1975, however was best known for his regular role as on the television soap opera The Sullivans as Bert Duggan from 1976 to 1978. His film appearances included roles in features and made-for television productions including The Last of the Knucklemen (1979), I Live with Me Dad (1985), The Hour Before My Brother Dies (1986), Two Friends (1986) and Fast Talking (1984),

The latter of which he was nominated for the 1984 Australian Film Institute Award for Best Actor in a Supporting Role.

== Filmography ==
=== Film ===
Year	Title	Role	Type
1998	The Boys	Graham Newman	Feature film
1991	Return to the Blue Lagoon	Quinlan	Feature film
1991	Sweet Talker	Giles	Feature film
1991	Daydream Believer (aka: The Girl Who Came Late)	German Film Director	Feature film
1988	Rikky and Pete	Desk Sergeant	Feature flm
1988	Touch the Sun: Devil's Hill	Dave	TV movie
1986	The Hour Before My Brother Dies	Martin	TV movie
1986	Fortress	Father Christmas	TV movie
1986	Kangaroo	Jaz	Feature film
1986	Two Friends	Malcolm	TV movie
1985	I Live with Me Dad	Sid	TV movie
1985	A Street to Die	Peter Townley	Feature film
1984	The Cowra Breakout	Padre	TV movie
1984	Crime of the Decade	Jack	TV movie
1984	Fast Talking	Ralph Carson	Feature film
1982	Heatwave	Cigar-Smoking Bodyguard	Feature film
1979	The Last of the Knucklemen	Tom	Feature film

=== Television ===
Year	Title	Role	Type
1996	Water Rats	Bowen	TV series, Season 1, episode 1
1983	Scales of Justice	Det. Const. Blake	TV miniseries
1980	The Last Outlaw	Aaron Sherritt	TV miniseries
1976-83	The Sullivans	Bert Duggan	TV series
