= One Summer Again =

- Based on: Original idea by Humphrey McQueen
- Written by: Bill Garner
- Directed by: Mark Callan
- Starring: Chris Hallam; Michele Fawdon; John Wood; Ian McFadyen; Matthew Pawley
- Country of origin: Australia
- Original language: English
- No. of episodes: 3 x 1 hour

Production
- Producer: Keith Wilkes

Original release
- Network: ABC
- Release: 23 July – 6 August 1985

One Summer Again is a 1985 Australian docudrama miniseries about the painter Tom Roberts and the Heidelberg School art movement. Set in and around the city of Melbourne in the late 19th century, the film traces Roberts' career and his relationships with other members of the Heidelberg School, including Arthur Streeton, Charles Conder and Frederick McCubbin. Their artists' camps are recreated in authentic bush settings, which one critic described as having "the soft warmth of a McCubbin painting". Film sets true to the period are contrasted with shots of contemporary Melbourne.

The title comes from a letter Conder sent to Roberts, longing for the time they spent painting together at Heidelberg: "Give me one summer again, with yourself and Streeton, the same long evenings, songs, dirty plates, and last pink skies. But these things don't happen, do they? And what's gone is over."

== Cast ==
- Chris Hallan as Tom Roberts
- John Wood as Sir Walter Corry
- Michele Fawdon as Jane Sutherland
- John Lee
- Joan Sydney
- Nina Landis as Clara Southern
- Wynn Roberts as James Smith
- Ian McFadyen as Theodore Fink
