= Laurie McInnes =

Australian filmmaker

- Born: Australia
- Occupations: Cinematographer, director

Laurie McInnes is an Australian writer, director, and cinematographer known for art films like Broken Highway and Dogwatch. Her work has been compared to Jim Jarmusch's.

McInnes has said that she grew up a lonely child who was bad at school, and she channeled those early feelings (the "ghosts" of her childhood) into her debut feature, Broken Highway.

Although her last effort as a director was with 1999's Dogwatch, she's continued to be active in the Australian film industry, working as a second-unit director and cinematographer for films like Look Both Ways and Night.

== Awards ==
Broken Highway—McInnes' breakthrough film—was nominated for the Palme d'Or at Cannes in 1993, but it lost to Jane Campion's The Piano. It was nominated for five AFI awards that year. Her earlier short, Palisade, won the top prize at Cannes in 1987.

== Selected filmography ==
- Dogwatch (1999) (writer, director)
- Broken Highway (1993) (writer, director)
- With Time to Kill (1987) (cinematographer)
- On Guard (1984) (cinematographer)
