= Stockade (film) =

- Directed by: Hans Pomeranz; Ross McGregor (acting)
- Written by: Kenneth Cook
- Based on: musical play by Kenneth Cook
- Produced by: Hans Pomeranz
- Starring: Rod Mullinar
- Cinematography: Oscar Scherl
- Edited by: Ronda MacGregor
- Music by: Michael Caulfield; Jack Grimsley; Max Hynam
- Production company: Spectrum Film Producers
- Distributed by: Kenneth Cook; Hans Pomeranz
- Release date: 9 December 1971
- Running time: 90 minutes
- Country: Australia
- Language: English
- Budget: $90,000

Stockade is a 1971 Australian musical film directed by Hans Pomeranz and Ross McGregor and starring Rod Mullinar. It is about the Eureka Stockade.

== Cast ==
- Michelle Fawdon as Elizabeth Green
- Rod Mullinar as Peter Lalor
- Graham Corry as George Black
- Sue Hollywood as Ma Bentley
- Charles Thorne as Captain Thomas
- Norman Willison as Johnny
- Max Cullen as Raffaello Carboni
- Michael Rolfe as Captain Wise
- George Clay as Edward Thoren

== Production ==
The film was based on a musical play by Kenneth Cook which had been commissioned by the New South Wales Drama Foundation and first performed in March 1971 at the Independent Theatre in Sydney. Most of the original cast returned and the play's director Ross McGregor was director of acting.

Shooting took place in May 1971 immediately after the end of the play's Sydney season. The shoot only took two weeks in at the Australiana Pioneer Village, Wilberforce, near Sydney. $15,000 of the budget came from the Australian Council for the Arts and $16,000 from the Australian Film Development Corporation.

== Release ==
In December 1971 the MP for Ballarat, Dudley Erwin, criticised the use of government money to make Stockade as it contained brothel scenes, and asked for it to be withdrawn from circulation.

The movie struggled to get distribution. Hans Pomeranz and Kenneth Cook complained that the NSW government refused to enforce the Film Quota Act, but at the same time prevented public screenings in unlicensed halls, stopping Australian producers from finding alternatives to screen their films. Pomeranz issued a formal demand to Eric Willis, chief secretary of the NSW government, for an inquiry into the New South Wales industry. He was ultimately unsuccessful.

Pomeranz and Cook eventually distributed the film themselves. Commercial reception was poor but the film was widely screened in schools and on television.
