= Erin James =

Australian actress

- Born: Newcastle, New South Wales
- Occupation: Actor
- Years active: 2007-

Erin James is an Australian actress. She was nominated for the 2014 AACTA Award for Best Actress in a Supporting Role for her role in The Little Death. The Little Death was her first film after working in theatre. Her stage credits include touring internationally with the musical Cats.
