= The Little Death (2014 film) =

- Theatrical release poster
- Directed by: Josh Lawson
- Written by: Josh Lawson
- Produced by: Jamie Hilton; Michael Petroni; Matt Reeder
- Starring: Bojana Novakovic; Josh Lawson; Damon Herriman; Kate Mulvany; Patrick Brammall; Kate Box; Alan Dukes; Lisa McCune; Erin James; T.J. Power; Kim Gyngell; Lachy Hulme
- Cinematography: Simon Chapman
- Edited by: Christian Gazal
- Music by: Michael Yezerski
- Production companies: See Pictures; Screen Australia; Night Kitchen Productions; Red Apple; Spectrum Films; Head Gear Films; Metrol Technology; Ticket to Ride
- Distributed by: Entertainment One
- Release dates: 13 June 2014 (Sydney Film Festival); 25 September 2014 (Australia)
- Running time: 96 minutes
- Country: Australia
- Language: English
- Box office: $1.3 million

The Little Death (known as A Funny Kind of Love in the United Kingdom) is a 2014 Australian sex comedy film written and directed by Josh Lawson. It deals with the secret lives of five suburban couples living in Sydney, revealing both the fetishes and the repercussions that come with sharing them. A Spanish remake titled Kiki, Love to Love was released in 2016.

== Cast ==
- Bojana Novakovic as Maeve
- Damon Herriman as Dan
- Josh Lawson as Paul
- Kate Box as Rowena
- Lisa McCune as Maureen
- T.J. Power as Sam
- Stephanie May as Mourner
- Ben Lawson as Glenn
- Patrick Brammall as Richard
- Kate Mulvany as Evie
- Lachy Hulme as Kim
- Alan Dukes as Phil
- Erin James as Monica
- Kim Gyngell as Steve
- Sophie Hensser as voice

== Reception ==
The Little Death received mixed reviews from critics and audiences, earning an approval rating of 60% on Rotten Tomatoes.

=== Accolades ===
| Award | Category | Subject | Result |
|---|---|---|---|
| AACTA Awards (4th) | Best Actor | Damon Herriman | Nominated |
| AACTA Awards (4th) | Best Actress | Kate Box | Nominated |
| AACTA Awards (4th) | Best Supporting Actor | Patrick Brammall | Nominated |
| AACTA Awards (4th) | Best Supporting Actor | T.J. Power | Nominated |
| AACTA Awards (4th) | Best Supporting Actress | Erin James | Nominated |
| AACTA Awards (4th) | Best Supporting Actress | Kate Mulvany | Nominated |
| ASE Award | Best Editing in a Feature Film | Christian Gazal | Nominated |
| South by Southwest Film Festival | Audience Award – Narrative Spotlight | Josh Lawson | Won |
| Thessaloniki Film Festival | Audience Award – Open Horizons | Josh Lawson | Won |

== See also ==
- Cinema of Australia
