= Naked: Stories of Men =

- Genre: Drama
- Country of origin: Australia
- Original language: English
- No. of seasons: 1
- No. of episodes: 6

Production
- Producer: Jan Chapman
- Running time: 60mins (approximately)

Original release
- Network: ABC
- Release: 3 March 1996

Naked: Stories of Men is a 1996 Australian anthology television series. It consisted of six self-contained contemporary dramas centred on the theme of masculinity and what it means to be a man in the world today.

Naked was nominated for the Australian Film Institute (AFI) Award for Best Telefeature or Mini Series, for the episode "The Fisherman's Wake".

== Episodes ==
No.	Title	Director	Writer	Starring
1	"Coral Island"	Neil Armfield	Nick Enright	Hugo Weaving, Frank Whitten, Joss McWilliam
2	"The Fisherman's Wake"	Neil Armfield	Andrew Bovell	Chris Haywood, Linden Wilkinson, Andrew McDonnell
3	"Blind-Side Breakaway"	Michael Carson	Paul Brown	Simon Baker-Denny, Veronica Neave, John Sheerin, Judith McGrath
4	"Ghost Story"	Richard Lowenstein	Tony Ayres	Diana Lin, Ben Chow, Nina Liu
5	"A Fallen Woman"	Geoffrey Wright	Stuart Sutcliffe	Max Phipps, Rachael Maza, Arthur Angel, Deborah Kennedy, Rhonda Doyle
6	"Cross Turning Over"	Robert Klenner	Roger McDonald	Graeme Blundell, Debra Byrne, Anzac Wallace
