= Cathy's Child =

- Directed by: Donald Crombie
- Written by: Ken Quinnell
- Based on: book A Piece of Paper by Dick Wordley
- Produced by: Pom Oliver; Errol Sullivan
- Starring: Michele Fawdon; Alan Cassell; Bryan Brown; Arthur Dignam; Willie Fennell
- Cinematography: Gary Hansen
- Edited by: Tim Wellburn
- Music by: William Motzing
- Distributed by: Village Roadshow
- Release date: 1979
- Running time: 89 minutes
- Country: Australia
- Language: English
- Budget: A$325,000
- Box office: A$135,000 (Australia) $100,000 (overseas sales)

Cathy's Child is a 1979 Australian film, directed by Donald Crombie and starring Michele Fawdon, Alan Cassell and Bryan Brown.

== Cast ==
- Michele Fawdon as Cathy Baikas
- Alan Cassell as Dick Wordley
- Bryan Brown as Paul Nicholson
- Arthur Dignam as Minister
- Willie Fennell as the Australian Consul
- Grant Dodwell as Hot Line Journalist
- Vic Rooney as Sergeant Newberry
- Frankie J. Holden as Detective Plummer
- Lex Marinos as Con Havros
- Robert Hughes as Mike
- Anna Hruby as Delia

== Plot ==
Cathy Baikas (Michele Fawdon) is a young Greek migrant who lives in Sydney, Australia with her three-year-old daughter. When her daughter's father abducts the child and returns to Greece, Cathy discovers the authorities can do little to help her, so she turns to the media. A newspaper reporter, Wordley (Alan Cassell) and his young editor (Bryan Brown), who several years prior had been through a similar experience, force the story onto the front page. giving her case press coverage and turning the spotlight on bureaucracy’s mishandling of the situation. The film is based on a true story.

== Historical basis ==
On 14 January 1973, Greek-born John Baikas left Australia for Athens, taking his daughter Maris with him on a forged passport. Her mother Cathy found out and tried to get her back. The government seemed to do little, so she contacted Sun journalist Dick Wordley to run a campaign.

The film used the real names for the characters of Cathy Baikas, Dick Wordley and Wordley's 'Hotline' editor, Paul Nicholson. However, other names were fictionalised.

== Production ==
Ken Quinnell read Dick Wordley's 1973 book on the case, A Piece of Paper. He gave it to producer Errol Sullivan, who thought it might make "a small but highly emotional film, one that could reach the middle audience in Australia – the audience that people like Hoyts say doesn't exist: namely, the North Shore, blue rinse set."

It was thought the budget had to be kept below $400,000, so the action was set in the present day rather than 1973. Finance came from the Australian Film Commission (AFC), the New South Wales Film Corporation, Roadshow Distributors and $55,000 of private investment. Gillian Armstrong was originally meant to be director and money was raised from the AFC on the basis of her name, but there was a potential clash with My Brilliant Career, so Donald Crombie, why had a history of making films about women, was offered the job instead.

Filming began in June 1978, with the majority of the film shot in Sydney over a period of four weeks, with a week's filming in Greece. Money had been allocated in the budget for an overseas actor to play the Australian consul in Greece, but the filmmakers were unable to find anyone for an appropriate price and Willie Fennell subsequently took the role.

The script included a scene where Cathy and Dick Wordley go to bed together. Wordley denied this ever happened but allowed it in the film after much discussion. The scene was shot but ended up being cut after a preview.

== Reception ==
=== Awards ===
Michele Fawdon was awarded Best Actress in a Leading Role at the 1979 Australian Film Institute Awards for her role as Cathy Baikis.

The film also received nominations for Best Actor in a Lead Role, Best Direction and Best Film at the same awards.

=== Box office ===
Cathy's Child grossed $135,000 at the box office in Australia, which is equivalent to $527,850 in 2009 dollars.

In 1996, Donald Crombie said the film was his favourite of all the features he had made:

Mainly because I think we were extraordinarily successful in creating that character, Cathy Bikos. Michelle Fawdon is obviously not Maltese, but she pulled that off brilliantly, I thought. The accent, I'm told, is perfect. She lived with a family and that's how she achieved it. That was a very good project to work on.

== See also ==
- Cinema of Australia
