= AACTA Award for Best Supporting Actress in Film =

Australian film award

AACTA Award for Best Actress in a Supporting Role
- Country: Australia
- Presented by: Australian Academy of Cinema and Television Arts (AACTA)
- First award: 1976
- Currently held by: Deborah Mailman, Kangaroo (2025)
- Website: https://www.aacta.org

The AACTA Award for Best Actress in a Supporting Role is an accolade given by the Australian Academy of Cinema and Television Arts (AACTA), a non-profit organisation whose aim is to "identify, award, promote, and celebrate Australia's greatest achievements in film and television".

The award is handed out at the annual AACTA Awards, which rewards achievements in feature film, television, documentaries, and short films. From 1976 to 2010, the category was presented by the Australian Film Institute (AFI), the academy's parent organisation, at the annual Australian Film Institute Awards (known as the AFI Awards). When the AFI launched the academy in 2011, it changed the annual ceremony to the AACTA Awards, with the current award being a continuum of the AFI Award for Best Actress in a Supporting Role.

Toni Collette and Judy Davis are the most awarded actresses in this category, with three wins each. Candidates for this award must be human and female, and cannot be nominated in the leading actress category for the same role in the same production.

== Winners and nominees ==
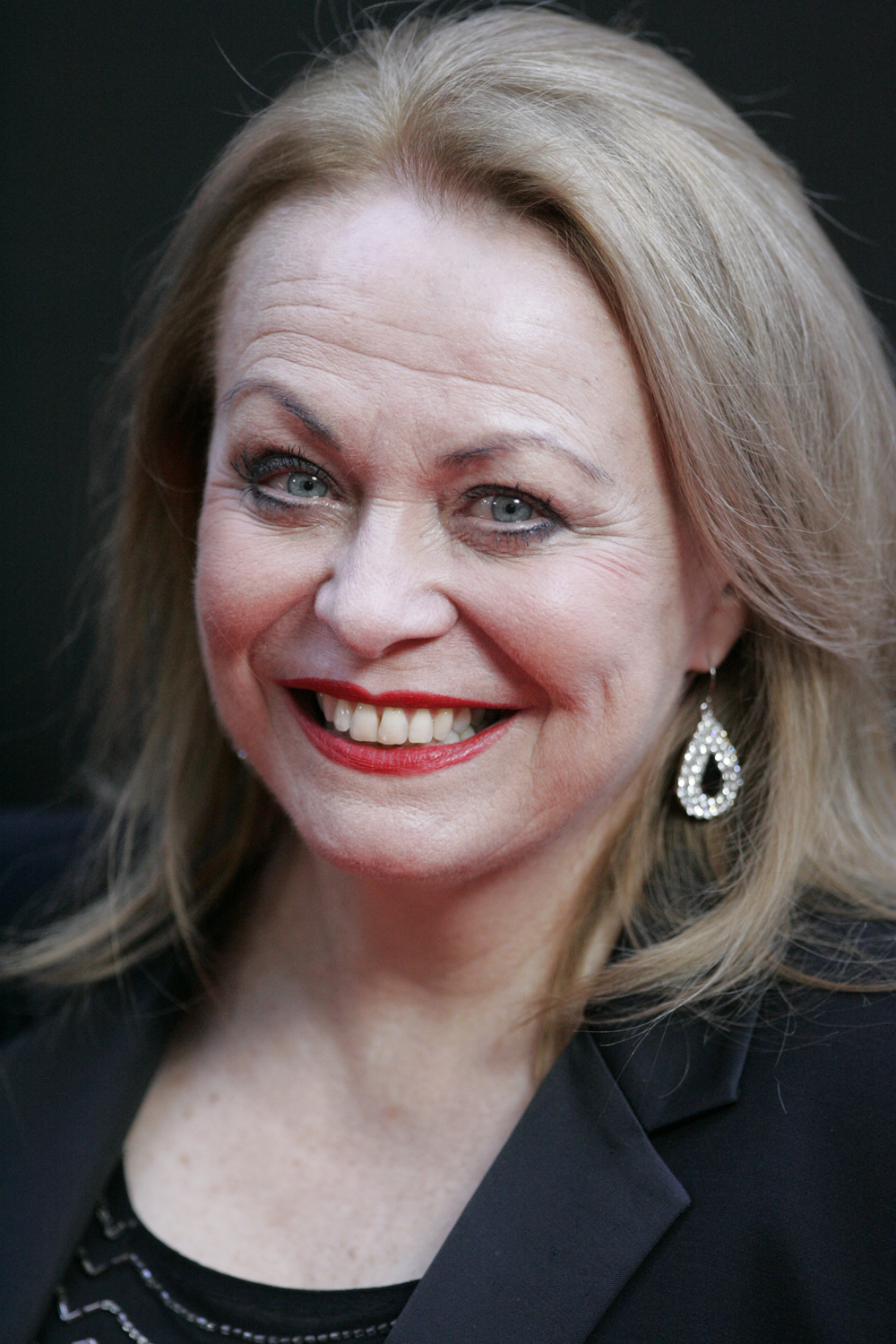
Jacki Weaver (pictured) and Melissa Jaffer were the first recipients of Best Supporting Actress for their roles in Caddie (1976).

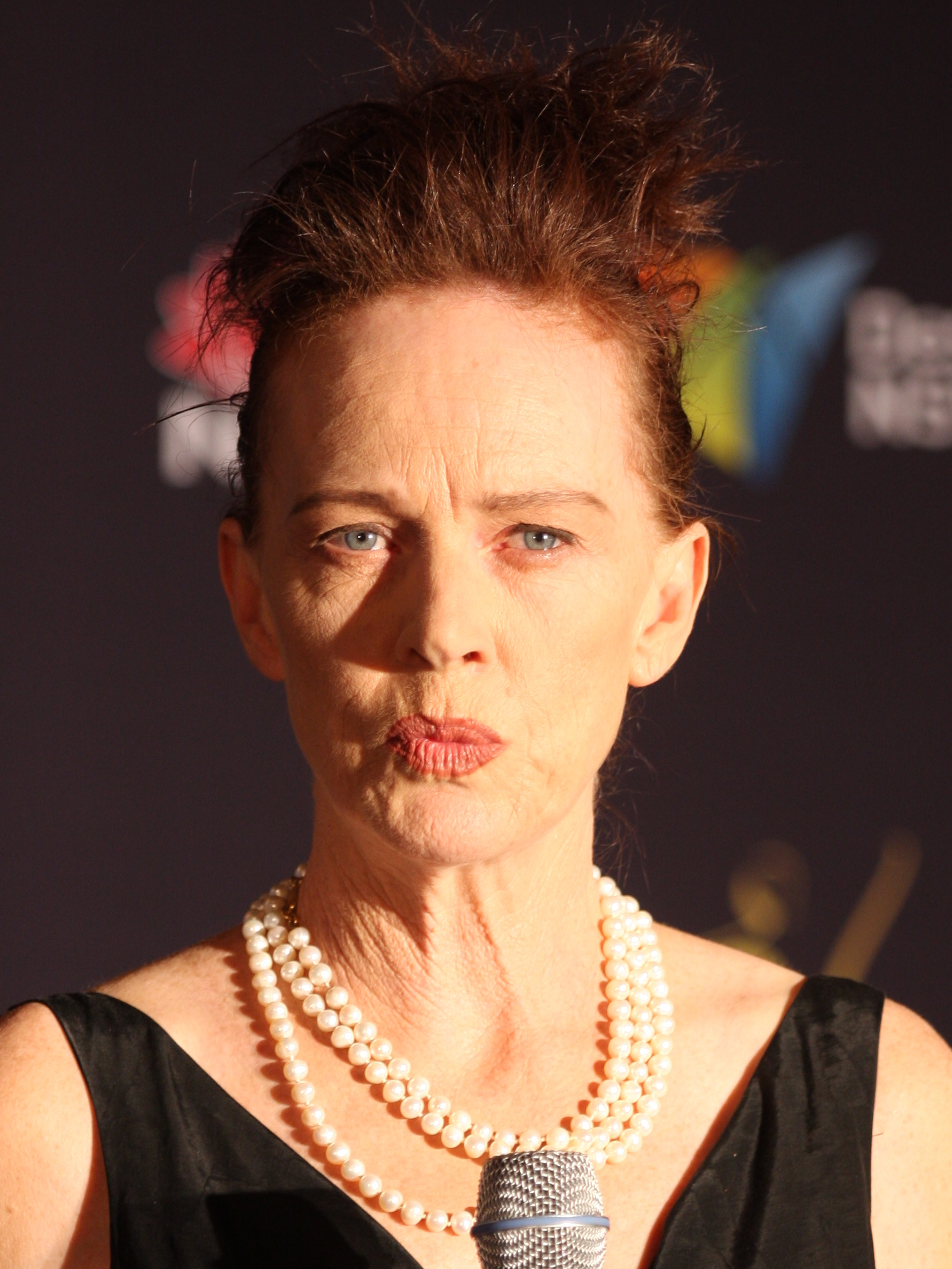
Judy Davis won for Hoodwink (1981), On My Own (1993), and The Dressmaker (2015).

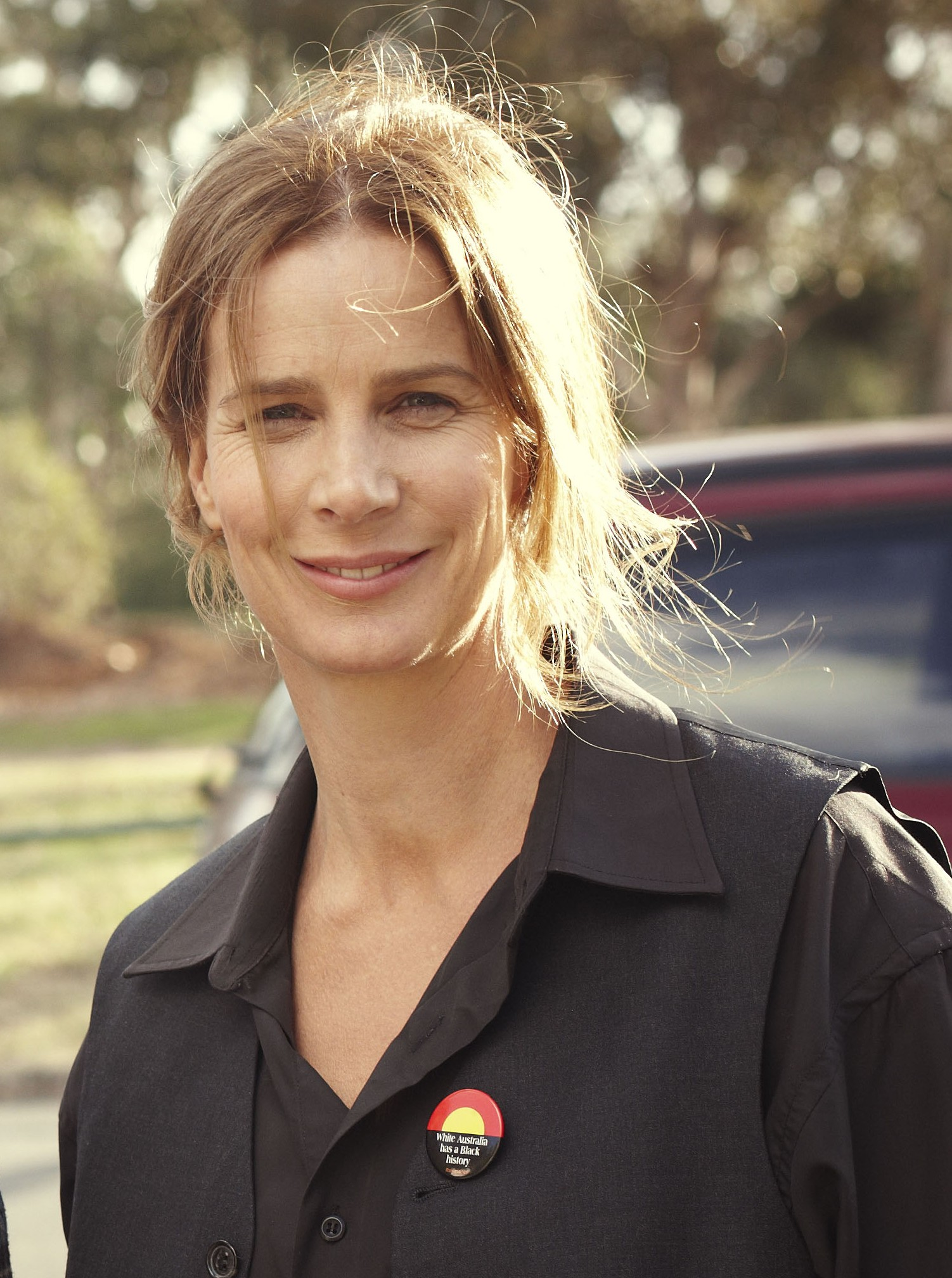
Rachel Griffiths won twice for her roles in Muriel's Wedding (1994) and Beautiful Kate (2009).

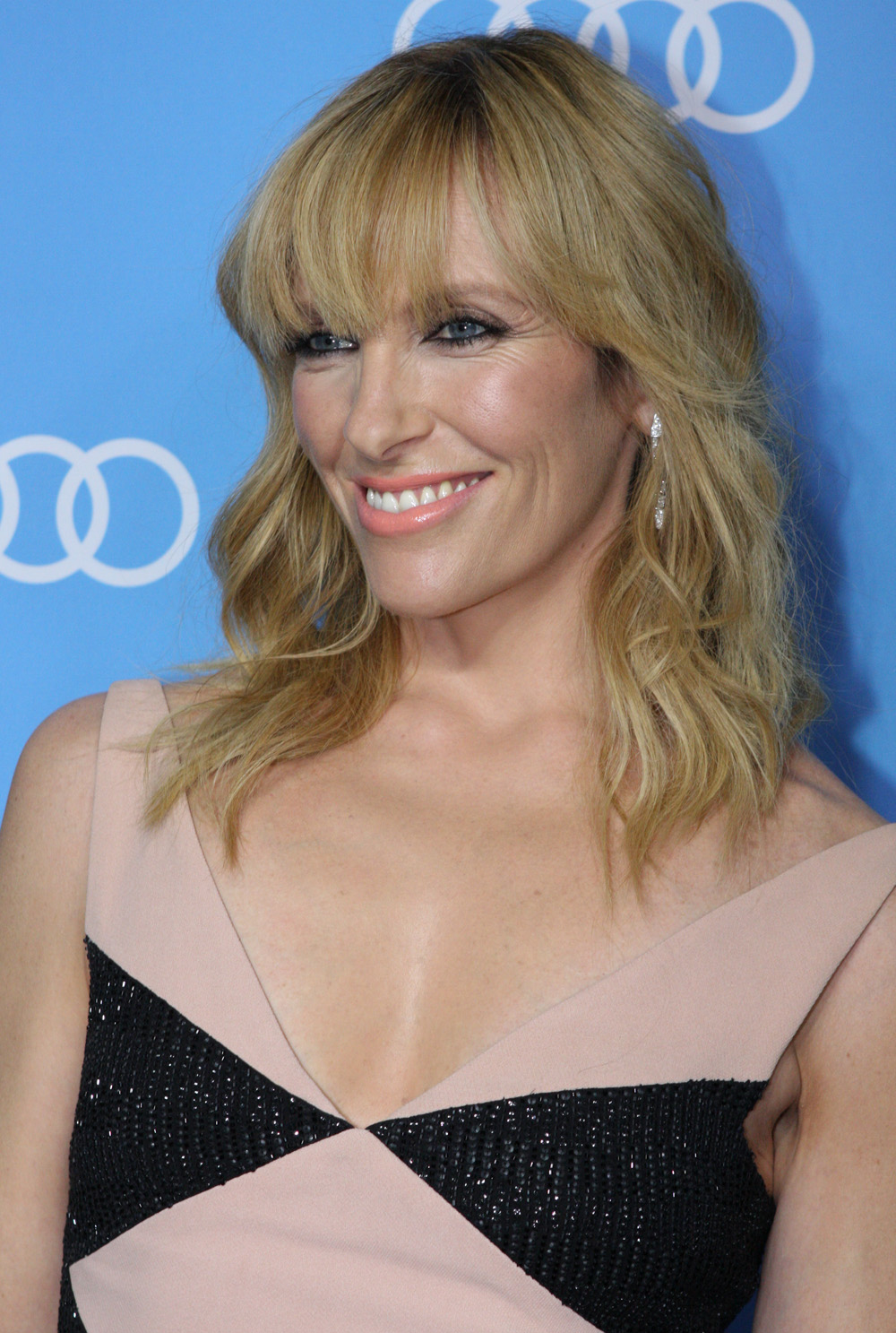
Toni Collette won for her performances in Lilian's Story (1996), The Boys (1998), and The Black Balloon (2008).

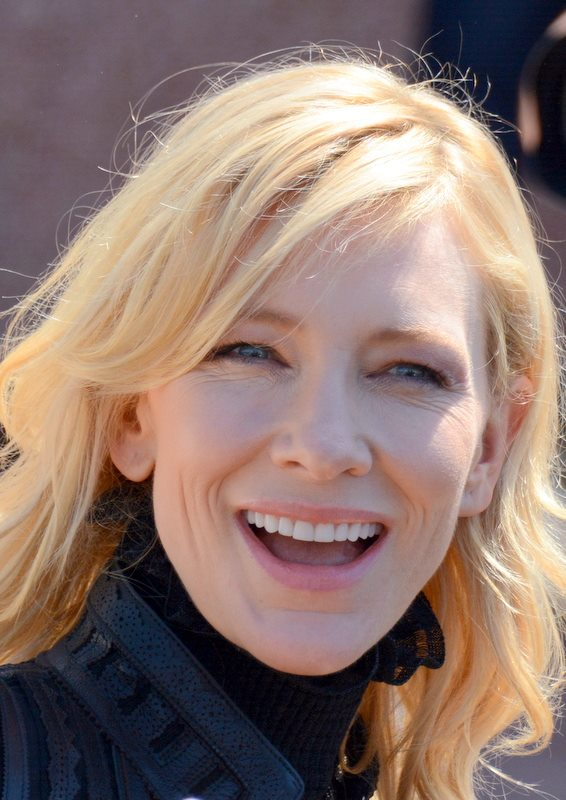
Cate Blanchett won for her role in Thank God He Met Lizzie (1997).

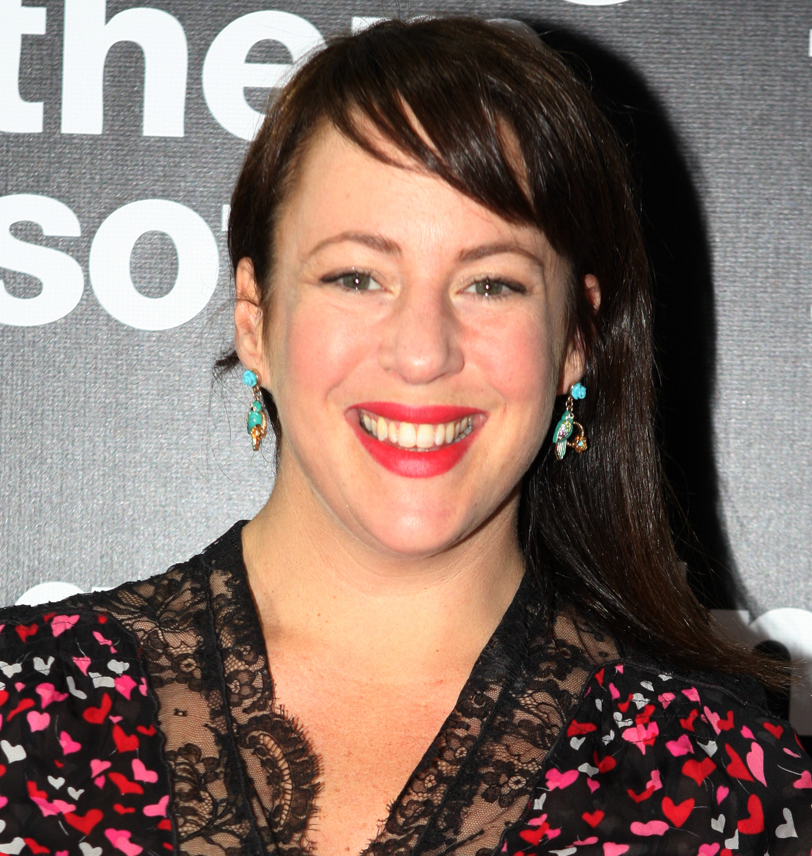
Sacha Horler won for her roles in Soft Fruit (1999) and Travelling Light (2003).

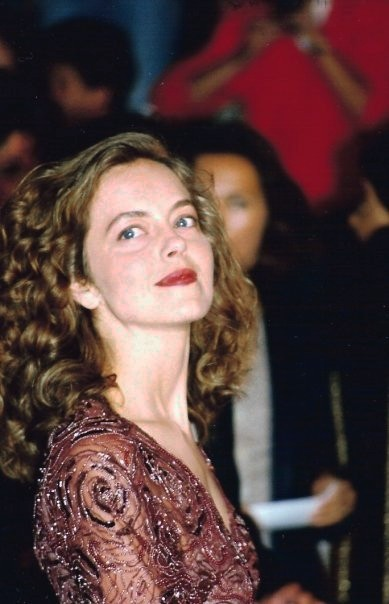
Greta Scacchi received the award for her role in Looking for Alibrandi (2000).

Year	Actress	Film	Role
1970s
1976	Melissa Jaffer	Caddie	Leslie
1976	Jacki Weaver	Caddie	Josie
1976	Kate Fitzpatrick	Promised Woman	Marge
1976	Helen Garner	Pure S	Jo
1976	Anne-Louise Lambert	Picnic at Hanging Rock	Miranda
1977	Veronica Lang	Don's Party	Jody
1977	Anne Haddy	The Fourth Wish	Dr. Kirk
1977	Ingrid Mason	Break of Day	Beth
1977	Judy Morris	The Picture Show Man	Miss Lockhart
1978	Angela Punch McGregor	Newsfront	Fay
1978	Carol Burns	The Mango Tree	Maudie Plover
1978	Diane Craig	The Mango Tree	Miss Pringle
1978	Patricia Kennedy	The Getting of Wisdom	Miss Chapman
1979	Pat Evison	Tim	Em Melville
1979	Aileen Britton	My Brilliant Career	Grandma Bossier
1979	Wendy Hughes	My Brilliant Career	Aunt Helen
1979	Patricia Kennedy	My Brilliant Career	Aunt Gussie
1980s
1980	Jill Perryman	Maybe This Time	Mother
1980	Michele Fawdon	Maybe This Time	Margo
1980	Jude Kuring	Maybe This Time	Meredith
1980	Lorna Lesley	The Chain Reaction	Gloria
1981	Judy Davis	Hoodwink	Sarah
1981	Cathy Downes	Winter of Our Dreams	Gretel
1981	Marion Edward	Road Games	Frita
1981	Rebecca Riggs	Fatty Finn	Tilly
1982	Kris McQuade	Fighting Back	Mrs. Goodwood
1982	Myra De Groot	Norman Loves Rose	Mother
1982	Alice Garner	Monkey Grip	Gracie
1982	Sandy Gore	Norman Loves Rose	Maureen
1983	Linda Hunt	The Year of Living Dangerously	Billy Kwan
1983	Pat Evison	The Clinic	Alda
1983	Sandy Gore	Undercover	Nina
1983	Robyn Nevin	Careful, He Might Hear You	Lila
1984	Anna Maria Monticelli	Silver City	Anna
1984	Sandy Gore	Street Hero	Bonnie Rogers
1984	Monica Maughan	Annie's Coming Out	Vera Peters
1984	Peta Toppano	Street Hero	Vinnie's Mother
1985	Annie Byron	Fran	Marge
1985	Genevieve Mooy	Emoh Ruo	Margaret York
1985	Narelle Simpson	Fran	Lisa
1985	Kerry Walker	Bliss	Alice Dalton
1986	Lindy Davies	Malcolm	Judith
1986	Kylie Belling	The Fringe Dwellers	Noonah Comeaway
1986	Victoria Longley	The More Things Change...	Geraldine
1986	Kerry Walker	Twelfth Night	Feste
1987	Jan Adele	High Tide	Bet
1987	Kaarin Fairfax	Belinda	Sandra
1987	Julie Hamilton	The Place at the Coast	Enid Burroughs
1987	Claudia Karvan	High Tide	Ally
1988	Tina Bursill	Jilted	Paula
1988	Mary Coustas	Mull	Helen
1988	Sue Jones	Mull	Deborah Mullens
1988	Julie Nihill	Boundaries of the Heart	June Thompson
1989	Victoria Longley	Celia	Alice Tanner
1989	Dorothy Barry	Sweetie	Flo
1989	Mary-Anne Fahey	Celia	Pat Carmichael
1989	Nicole Kidman	Emerald City	Helen
1990s
1990	Julia Blake	Father	Iya Zetnick
1990	Ruth Cracknell	Kokoda Crescent	Alice
1990	Penne Hackforth-Jones	Kokoda Crescent	Carol
1990	Maggie King	The Big Steal	Edith Clark
1991	Fiona Press	Waiting	Therese
1991	Toni Collette	Spotswood	Wendy Robinson
1991	Gosia Dobrowolska	A Woman's Tale	Anna
1991	Helen Jones	Waiting	Sandy
1992	Pat Thomson	Strictly Ballroom	Shirley Hastings
1992	Gia Carides	Strictly Ballroom	Liz Holt
1992	Willa O'Neill	Secrets	Vicki
1992	Miranda Otto	The Last Days of Chez Nous	Annie
1993	Judy Davis	On My Own	The Mother
1993	Jill Forster	Say a Little Prayer	Mrs. Easterbrook
1993	Kris McQuade	Broken Highway	Woman
1993	Kerry Walker	The Piano	Aunt Morag
1994	Rachel Griffiths	Muriel's Wedding	Rhonda Epinstall
1994	Jeanie Drynan	Muriel's Wedding	Betty Heslop
1994	Deborah Kennedy	The Sum of Us	Joyce Johnson
1994	Jacqueline McKenzie	Traps	Viola
1995	Amanda Douge	That Eye, the Sky	Tegwyn Flack
1995	Essie Davis	Dad and Dave: On Our Selection	Kate Rudd
1995	Nadine Garner	Metal Skin	Roslyn
1995	Rebecca Gibney	Lucky Break	Gloria Wrightman
1996	Toni Collette	Lilian's Story	Young Lilian Singer
1996	Zoe Carides	Brilliant Lies	Katy Connor
1996	Alice Garner	Love and Other Catastrophes	Alice
1996	Annette Shun Wah	Floating Life	Yen Chan
1997	Cate Blanchett	Thank God He Met Lizzie	Lizzie
1997	Annie Byron	Doing Time for Patsy Cline	Mum
1997	Sophie Lee	The Castle	Tracey Petropoulous
1997	Rebecca Smart	Blackrock	Cherie Milenko
1998	Toni Collette	The Boys	Michelle
1998	Miranda Otto	In the Winter Dark	Ronnie
1998	Rena Owen	Dance Me to My Song	Rix
1998	Angela Punch McGregor	Terra Nova	Margie
1999	Sacha Horler	Soft Fruit	Nadia
1999	Claudia Karvan	Passion	Alfhild de Luce
1999	Susie Porter	Two Hands	Deirdre
1999	Emily Woof	Passion	Karen Holten
2000s
2000	Greta Scacchi	Looking for Alibrandi	Christina Alibrandi
2000	Elena Cotta	Looking for Alibrandi	Katia Alibrandi
2000	Sacha Horler	Russian Doll	Liza
2000	Kris McQuade	Better Than Sex	Taxi Driver
2001	Rachael Blake	Lantana	Jane O'May
2001	Lourdes Bartolomé	La Spagnola	Manola
2001	Daniela Farinacci	Lantana	Paula D'Amato
2001	Belinda McClory	Mullet	Kay
2002	Judi Farr	Walking on Water	Margaret
2002	Celia Ireland	Australian Rules	Liz Black
2002	Anna Lise Phillips	Envy	Rachel
2002	Maya Stange	Garage Days	Kate
2003	Sacha Horler	Travelling Light	Bronwyn White
2003	Melanie Griffith	The Night We Called It a Day	Barbara Marx
2003	Miranda Richardson	The Rage in Placid Lake	Sylvia Lake
2003	Helen Thomson	Gettin' Square	Marion Barrington
2004	Lynette Curran	Somersault	Irene
2004	Hollie Andrew	Somersault	Bianca
2004	Rachael Blake	Tom White	Helen White
2004	Loene Carmen	Tom White	Christine
2005	Noni Hazlehurst	Little Fish	Janelle Heart
2005	Daniela Farinacci	Look Both Ways	Julia
2005	Tracy Mann	Hating Alison Ashley	Erica's mother
2005	Kestie Morassi	Wolf Creek	Kristy Earl
2006	Susie Porter	Caterpillar Wish	Susan Woodbridge
2006	Deborra-Lee Furness	Jindabyne	Jude
2006	Noni Hazlehurst	Candy	Elaine Wyatt
2006	Genevieve Lemon	Suburban Mayhem	Dianne
2007	Emma Booth	Clubland	Jill
2007	Sibylla Budd	The Bet	Tory
2007	Irene Chen	The Home Song Stories	May
2007	Esme Melville	Romulus, My Father	Miss Collard
2008	Toni Collette	The Black Balloon	Maggie Mollison
2008	Saskia Burmeister	The Jammed	Vanya
2008	Maeve Dermody	Black Water	Lee
2008	Leeanna Walsman	Bitter & Twisted	Indigo Samvini
2009	Rachel Griffiths	Beautiful Kate	Sally Kendall
2009	Maeve Dermody	Beautiful Kate	Toni
2009	Mitjili Napanangka Gibson	Samson and Delilah	Nana
2009	Bea Viegas	Balibo	Juliana
2010s
2010	Deborah Mailman	Bran Nue Dae	Roxanne
2010	Julia Blake	The Boys Are Back	Barbara
2010	Kerry Fox	Bright Star	Fanny's mother
2010	Laura Wheelwright	Animal Kingdom	Nicky Henry
AACTA Awards
2011 (1st)	Louise Harris	Snowtown	Elizabeth Harvey
2011 (1st)	Morgana Davies	The Hunter	Sass
2011 (1st)	Helen Morse	The Eye of the Storm	Lotte
2011 (1st)	Alexandra Schepisi	The Eye of the Storm	Flora
2012 (2nd)	Jessica Mauboy	The Sapphires	Julie
2012 (2nd)	Essie Davis	Burning Man	Karen
2012 (2nd)	Rebecca Gibney	Mental	Shirley Moochmore
2012 (2nd)	Deborah Mailman	Mental	Sandra
2013 (3rd)	Elizabeth Debicki	The Great Gatsby	Jordan Baker
2013 (3rd)	Isla Fisher	The Great Gatsby	Myrtle Wilson
2013 (3rd)	Mirrah Foulkes	The Turning	Fay Keenan
2013 (3rd)	Alice Keohavong	The Rocket	Mali
2014 (4th)	Susan Prior	The Rover	Dorothy Peeples
2014 (4th)	Erin James	The Little Death	Monica
2014 (4th)	Jacqueline McKenzie	The Water Diviner	Eliza Connor
2014 (4th)	Kate Mulvany	The Little Death	Evie
2015 (5th)	Judy Davis	The Dressmaker	Molly Dunnage
2015 (5th)	Emma Hamilton	Last Cab to Darwin	Julie
2015 (5th)	Deborah Mailman	Paper Planes	Maureen
2015 (5th)	Sarah Snook	The Dressmaker	Gertrude "Trudy" Pratt
2016 (6th)	Miranda Otto	The Daughter	Charlotte
2016 (6th)	Kerry Armstrong	Pawno	Jennifer Montgomery
2016 (6th)	Rachel Griffiths	Hacksaw Ridge	Bertha Doss
2016 (6th)	Anna Torv	The Daughter	Anna
2017 (7th)	Nicole Kidman	Lion	Sue Brierley
2017 (7th)	Frances Duca	Ali's Wedding	Zahra
2017 (7th)	Jacqueline McKenzie	Don't Tell	Jean Dalton
2017 (7th)	Susie Porter	Hounds of Love	Maggie Maloney
2018 (8th)	Nicole Kidman	Boy Erased	Nancy Eamons
2018 (8th)	Elizabeth Debicki	Breath	Eva
2018 (8th)	Natassia Gorey-Furber	Sweet Country	Lizzie Kelly
2018 (8th)	Noni Hazlehurst	Ladies in Black	Miss Cartwright
2018 (8th)	Simone Kessell	1%	Hayley
2019 (9th)	Magnolia Maymuru	The Nightingale	Lowanna
2019 (9th)	Tilda Cobham-Hervey	Hotel Mumbai	Sally
2019 (9th)	Hilary Swank	I Am Mother	Woman
2019 (9th)	Bolude Watson	Hearts and Bones	Anishka Ahmed
2019 (9th)	Ursula Yovich	Top End Wedding	Daffy Ford
2020s
2020 (10th)	Essie Davis	Babyteeth	Anna Finlay
2020 (10th)	Emma Booth	H is for Happiness	Claire Phee
2020 (10th)	Bella Heathcote	Relic	Sam
2020 (10th)	Deborah Mailman	H is for Happiness	Penelope Benson
2020 (10th)	Doris Younane	Measure for Measure	Karima
2021 (11th)	Essie Davis	Nitram	Helen
2021 (11th)	Claudia Karvan	June Again	Ginny
2021 (11th)	Esmerelda Marimowa	High Ground	Gulwirri
2021 (11th)	Miranda Tapsell	The Dry	Rita Raco
2021 (11th)	Jacki Weaver	Penguin Bloom	Jan
2022 (12th)	Olivia DeJonge	Elvis	Priscilla Presley
2022 (12th)	Jada Alberts	The Stranger	Detective Senior Constable Kate Rylett
2022 (12th)	Jessica De Gouw	The Drover's Wife: The Legend of Molly Johnson	Louisa Klintoff
2022 (12th)	Joanna Lumley	Falling for Figaro	Meghan Geoffrey-Bishop
2022 (12th)	Yael Stone	Blaze	Hannah
2023 (13th)	Deborah Mailman	The New Boy	Sister Mum
2023 (13th)	Alex Jensen	Talk to Me	Jade
2023 (13th)	Tasma Walton	Sweet As	Mitch
2023 (13th)	Mia Wasikowska	Blueback	Abby Jackson
2023 (13th)	Ursula Yovich	The Royal Hotel	Carol
2023 (13th)	Selina Zahednia	Shayda	Mona
2024 (14th)	Jacki Weaver	Memoir of a Snail	Pinky
2024 (14th)	Alyla Browne	Furiosa: A Mad Max Saga	Imperator Furiosa
2024 (14th)	Hannah Diviney	Audrey	Norah
2024 (14th)	Kate Mulvany	Better Man	Janet Williams
2024 (14th)	Kate Mulvany	How to Make Gravy	Stella
2024 (14th)	Ingrid Torelli	Late Night with the Devil	Lilly D'Abo
2025 (15th)	Deborah Mailman	Kangaroo	Rosie
2025 (15th)	Marta Dusseldorp	With or Without You	Sharon
2025 (15th)	Brooke Satchwell	Kangaroo	Liz
2025 (15th)	Yael Stone	The Correspondent	Kate Peyton
2025 (15th)	Sally-Anne Upton	Bring Her Back	Wendy
2025 (15th)	Sora Wong	Bring Her Back	Piper
