= Raoul Wallenberg: Between the Lines =

1985 documentary film

- Directed by: Karin Altmann
- Written by: Karin Altmann
- Produced by: Bob Weis
- Music by: George Dreyfus
- Release date: 1985
- Running time: 86 minutes
- Country: Australia
- Language: English

Raoul Wallenberg: Between the Lines is a 1985 Australian documentary film, directed by Karin Altmann and produced by Bob Weis, about Raoul Wallenberg, who saved the lives of many Jews in Budapest during World War 2.

== Reception ==
Dennis Pryor of the Age says "Weis and Altman have produced something worthy of the man himself." When broadcast by Channel Ten the Age's Barbara Hooks finishes "The results are totally absorbing and deserving of more than the late hour allocated to them."

== Awards ==
- 1985 Australian Film Institute Awards
  - Best Documentary - Bob Weis - won
