= Kim Dalton =

Kim Dalton was the Australian Broadcasting Corporation's Director of Television from 2006 until December 2012 when he announced he would leave the corporation. Before this appointment, Dalton had been chief executive of the Australian Film Commission since 1999.

== Career ==
In 2007 Dalton was awarded the Medal of the Order of Australia for service to the film and television industry in policy, in assistance to Indigenous producers and in the promotion of emerging visual technology.

In August 2011, the ABC eliminated three television programs and laid off some staff. The Community and Public Sector Union complained about the staff cuts. Dalton said the audience for Art Nation, one of the eliminated programs, had fallen by 30%. Australian Senator Nick Xenophon initiated an inquiry into the staff and programming cuts. A report from the environment and communications references committee was released on 13 October 2011.

In February 2012, the ABC appointed a new head of arts effective 11 April 2012. Dalton said the new position would report to him, and as "a result of changes to our arts production and line up last year we have increased the resources committed to primetime arts programming to be commissioned from the independent production sector."

In November 2012, ABC Managing Director Mark Scott and Dalton announced the closure of television production facilities in Hobart, making 16 staff members redundant. Tasmanian senator Catryna Bilyk called for further investigation after ABC announced it was cutting the state's TV production unit.
