= Kate Mulvany =

Australian actress & writer (born february 24 1977)

Kate Mulvany OAM
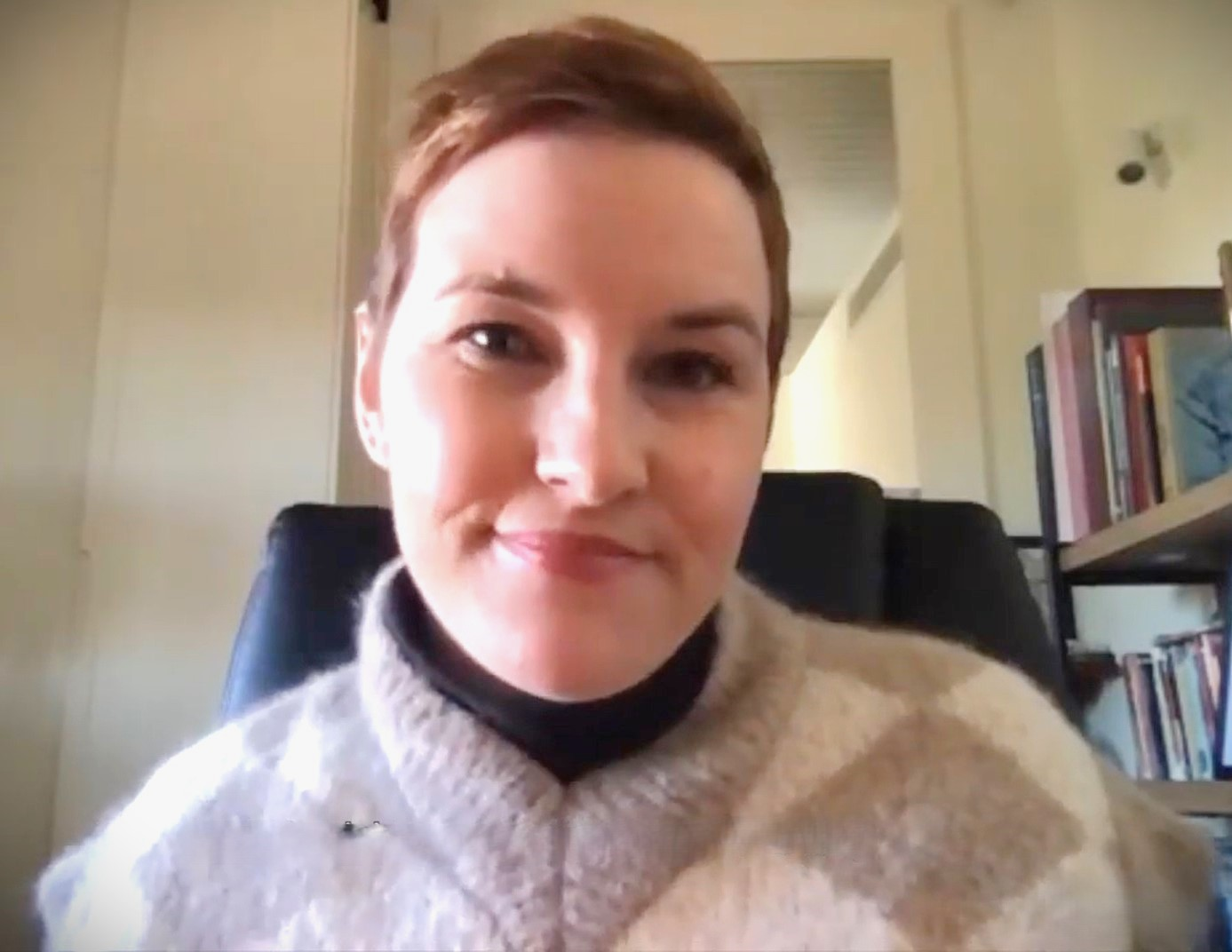
- Mulvany in 2020
- Born: 1977 (age 48–49); Geraldton, Western Australia
- Education: Bachelor of Arts, Curtin University
- Occupations: Actress, playwright, screenwriter
- Years active: 1998–present
- Spouse: Hamish Michael (m. 2015)

Kate Maree Mulvany (born 1977) is an Australian actress, playwright and screenwriter. She works in theatre, television and film, with roles in Hunters (2020–2023), The Great Gatsby (2013), Griff the Invisible (2010) and The Final Winter (2007). She has played lead roles with Australian theatre companies as well as appearing on television and in film.

She has won several awards, including the Philip Parsons Young Playwrights Award for The Seed in 2004 and the Helpmann Award for Best Female Actor in a Play for her role in Richard 3 in 2017.

== Early life and education ==
Kate Maree Mulvany was born in 1977 and grew up in Geraldton, Western Australia. Her father, Danny, had migrated to Australia as a "ten-pound Pom" from Nottingham in England. He was called up to fight in the Vietnam War when he was 22, despite not being an Australian citizen at that time, and developed PTSD from his experiences there. Her mother, Glenys, is a schoolteacher. She has a sister, Tegan, who is seven years younger than her.

Mulvany was diagnosed with a Wilms's tumor (renal cancer) at age two and spent much of her childhood in hospital. Her cancer may be linked to her father's exposure to Agent Orange (which was contaminated with dioxin) during his service in the Vietnam War, although this has not been proven. After having to undergo chemotherapy and radiotherapy and a radical nephrectomy, she was declared in remission. However, the treatment and cancer had affected her body as she grew, and caused infertility.

In 1994 she moved to Perth for university, accompanied by her family. She earned a double major degree in script writing and theatre, and was tutored by Elizabeth Jolley. In 1997, she received her Bachelor of Arts degree from Curtin University, and moved to Sydney in 1998.

== Career ==
Mulvany has played lead roles with Australian theatre companies as well as appearing on television and in film.

For Bell Shakespeare she played Cassius, Lady Macbeth, and was lauded for her performance as Richard III in which she revealed her real-life spinal disability. Her adaptation of Craig Silvey's novel Jasper Jones has been performed in Perth by Barking Gecko Theatre Company, in Sydney by Belvoir St Theatre, and in Melbourne by the Melbourne Theatre Company. In 2015 it was shortlisted for the Nick Enright Prize for Playwriting in the New South Wales Premier's Literary Awards.

In 2018, Mulvany adapted Ruth Park's The Harp in the South trilogy as a two-part play for Sydney Theatre Company. In 2019, she followed this with an adaptation of the Schiller play Mary Stuart - the first to be undertaken by a woman - again for Sydney Theatre Company. One review said, "Mulvany’s bold adaptation recentres the queens, shearing away nearly every male soliloquy and interaction held exclusively between men, of which there are an abundance in Schiller’s text", while others called it "dazzlingly different", and a "feminist" reimagining of a classic.

In April 2019, Deadline announced that Mulvany had been cast as a series regular in Amazon Prime Video's new 10-episode Nazi-hunting series Hunters, created by David Weil and produced by Jordan Peele. She played one of the Hunters, Sister Harriet.

In August 2023 Mulvany narrated the three-part ABC Television series Our Vietnam War.

== Other activities ==
Mulvany is an ambassador for MiVAC (Mines, Victims and Clearance), a landmine advocacy and support group.

== Personal life ==
Mulvany was partner to actor Mark Priestley, who died by suicide when she was 30 years old.

In 2015 she wed fellow actor Hamish Michael in New York.

== Recognition and awards ==
=== General ===
- 2017: Honorary doctorate from Curtin University for her services to the arts in Australia
- 2017: Sidney Myer Performing Arts Award
- 2020: Medal of the Order of Australia (OAM) in the 2020 Australia Day Honours, for service to the performing arts
- 2018: Named patron of the Hayman Theatre at Curtin, along with its theatre company and the Curtin Theatre Arts Program for a term of three years
- 2020: Mona Brand Award, worth $35,000, "presented to a woman who has a body of outstanding work which displays broad array and which has been widely performed or screened to critical acclaim"

=== As actor ===
Year	Organisation	Award	Nominated work	Result	Ref.
2025	AACTA Awards	Best Supporting Actress	Better Man	Nominated	
2025	AACTA Awards	Best Supporting Actress	How to Make Gravy	Nominated	
2019	Helpmann Awards	Best Female Actor in a Play	Every Brilliant Thing	Won	
2018	Green Room Awards	Best Female Performer	Richard III	Won	
2018	AACTA Awards	Best Lead Actress in a Feature Film	The Merger	Nominated	
2017	Helpmann Awards	Best Female Actor in a Play	Richard III	Won	
2017	Sydney Theatre Awards	Best Female Actor in a Leading Role in a Mainstage Production	Richard III	Won	
2015	AACTA Awards	Best Lead Actress in a Feature Film	The Little Death	Nominated	
2014	Sydney Theatre Awards	Best Actress in a Supporting Role in a Mainstage Production	Tartuffe	Won	
2011	Sydney Theatre Awards	Best Actress in a Leading Role in a Mainstage Production	Julius Caesar	Nominated	
2007	Sydney Theatre Awards	Best Actress in a Lead Role	The Seed	Nominated	
1998	Green Room Awards	Best Female Performer	Killer Joe	Nominated	

=== As writer ===
Year	Organisation	Award	Nominated work	Result
2019	David Williamson Prize	For Excellence in Writing for Australian Theatre	The Harp in the South	Won
2018	Sydney Theatre Awards	Best Mainstage Production	The Harp in the South	Won
2018	Sydney Theatre Awards	Best New Australian Work	The Harp in the South	Won
2018	AWGIE Awards	Best Theatre: Stage	The Rasputin Affair	Nominated
2017	Helpmann Awards	Best Play	Jasper Jones	Nominated
2017	Helpmann Awards	Best New Australian Work	Jasper Jones	Won
2015-2016	Intersticia Foundation	Bell Shakespeare Writers' Fellowship		Won
2014	Sydney Theatre Company	Patrick White Playwrights Fellowship		Won
2013	AWGIE Awards	Best Theatre: Stage	Medea	Won
2012	Sydney Theatre Awards	Best Mainstage Production	Medea	Won
2012	Sydney Theatre Awards	Best New Australian Work	Medea	Won
2007	Sydney Theatre Awards	Best Independent Production	The Seed	Won
2007	Sydney Theatre Awards	Best New Australian Work	The Seed	Nominated
2004	Belvoir	Philip Parsons Young Playwrights Award	The Seed	Won
2004	Sydney Theatre Company	Patrick White Playwrights Award	The Danger Age	Nominated
2002	Naked Theatre Company	Write Now! Playwrighting Competition	Blood & Bone	Won

== Filmography ==
=== Film ===
Year	Title	Role	Notes
2024	How to Make Gravy	Stella	
2024	Better Man	Janet Williams	
2022	Elvis	Marion Keisker	
2018	The Merger	Angie Barlow	
2014	The Little Death	Evie	
2013	The Turning	Gail Lang	
2013	The Great Gatsby	Mrs McKee	
2012	Scratch	Vet	Short
2010	Connection	Natalie	Short
2010	Griff the Invisible	Cecila	
2009	Into My Arms	Anna	Short
2007	The Final Winter	Kate	

=== Television ===
Year	Title	Role	Notes	Ref
2026	My Brilliant Career	Augusta		
2023	The Clearing	Tasmin Latham	6 episodes	
2020-23	Hunters	Sister Harriet	18 episodes	
2022	The Twelve	Kate Lawson	10 episodes	
2021	RFDS	Rhiannon Emerson	3 episodes	
2019	Lambs of God	Frankie Jones	3 episodes	
2019	Get Krack!n	Skye	1 episode	
2018	Fighting Season	Captain Kim Nordenfelt	6 episodes	
2016	Secret City	Ronnie	6 episodes	
2015	Miss Fisher's Murder Mysteries	Eva/Millie	1 episode	
2010-15	Winter	Lauren McIntrye	4 episodes	
2011-12	The Hamster Wheel	Additional Cast	8 episodes	
2011	My Place	Mrs Owen	3 episodes	
2011	Underbelly Files: The Man Who Got Away	Kate Mariner	TV Movie	
2009	Chasers War on Everything		1 episode	
2007	Chandon Pictures	Maggie	1 episode	
2007	The Chaser Decides		1 episode	
2000	All Saints	Hayley McMasters	1 episode	

Writing

Year	Title	Role	Notes	Ref
2022	Summer Love	Writer	1 episode	
2019-20	Upright	Writer	8 episodes	
2016-18	Beat Bugs	Writer	3 episodes	
2013	Chicom	Writer	Short	
