= Julie Hamilton =

Australian actress

- Born: Adelaide, South Australia
- Occupation: Actor

Julie Hamilton is an Australian actress. She was nominated for the 1987 AFI Award for Best Actress in a Supporting Role for her role in The Place at the Coast and for a Logie Award for Best Actress for I Can Jump Puddles. Other roles include films Holy Smoke!, Joh's Jury, The Fourth Wish and Burke & Wills, television roles in The Shiralee, Melba and The Oracle and on stage in Shirley Valentine, Travelling North, Broadway Bound and Simon Gray's Close of Play.

Hamilton was the star of a 1988-90 Australian production of Shirley Valentine beginning 30 December 1988 at the Wharf Theatre in Sydney and travelling on to Universal Theatre (North Fitzroy, VIC), Bridge Theatre (Coniston, NSW), The Playhouse (Adelaide SA), The Playhouse (Civic Square, ACT), Q Theatre (Penrith, NSW) before finishing at Playhouse (Newcastle, NSW) on the 24 April 1990.
