= Under the Skin (TV series) =

- Genre: Drama
- Country of origin: Australia
- Original language: English
- No. of seasons: 1
- No. of episodes: 12

Production
- Executive producers: Barbara Mariotti; Chris Oliver
- Producer: Franco di Chiera
- Running time: 27mins (approximately)
- Production companies: Film Australia; Realworld Pictures

Original release
- Network: SBS
- Release: 16 February 1994

Under the Skin is a 1994 Australian anthology television series.

== Synopsis ==
The series consisted of twelve half-hour dramas, each reflecting different aspects of Australian cultural and regional diversity, encompassing refugee stories, black comedies, street-wise drama, family conflict, old age love stories, road movies and teen romances. Each episode was written and directed by new, award-winning filmmakers.

== Cast ==
- Arthur Angel as Dino
- Nadine Garner as Jen
- Frankie J. Holden as Mr Reid
- Joe Spano
- Kerry Walker
- Noni Hazlehurst
- Norman Kaye
- Barry Otto
- Patrick Ward
- John Jarratt
- Diana Lin
- Solomon Wong
- Tina Bursill as Julie
- Annie Byron
- Gwen Plumb
- Annette Shun Wah
- Alwyn Kurts
- Anna Maria Monticelli
- Christine Amor
- Peter Whitford
- Nicola Quilter
- Mary-Louisa Abbate-Gentile
- Jolanta Pizarek
- Luciano Martucci
- Rosa Tommasini

== Episodes ==
No.	Title	Director	Writer	Starring
1	"Dino, Where You Been?"	Aleksi Vellis	John Ruane	Arthur Angel, Nadine Garner, Frankie J. Holden, Joe Spano
2	"Best Wishes"	Monica Pellizzari	Monica Pellizzari	Kerry Walker
3	"Grandma's Teeth"	Belinda Chayko	Belinda Chayko	Noni Hazlehurst, Norman Kaye, Barry Otto
4	"Windows"	Teresa Crea	Teresa Crea	
5	"The Long Ride"	Pip Karmel	Tony Ayres	John Jarratt, Diana Lin, Solomon Wong
6	"Line Home"	Riju Ramrakha	Fran Ross	
7	"A Little Love"			
8	"The Chase"	Luigi Aquisto		
9	"Long Way Round"		Therese Collie	Tina Bursill
10	"Family Spirit"	Teck Tan		Annie Byron, Gwen Plumb, Annette Shun Wah
11	"Old Sam, Jasper and Mr Frank"	George Karpathakis		Alwyn Kurts
12	"Blanket of Love"	Ken Miller		

== Awards and festivals ==
Under the Skin was awarded an Best Mini-Series or Telefeature at the 1994 Australian Film Institute Awards, for the episode "The Long Ride".

In 1995, the 38th San Francisco International Film Festival presented a Golden Gate Award Certificate of Merit to the episode "The Long Ride".
