= Michele Fawdon =

Australian actress (1947–2011)

- Born: 15 December 1947; Harrow, London, England
- Died: 23 May 2011 (aged 63); Melbourne, Victoria, Australia
- Occupation: Actress
- Years active: 1967–2010

Michele Fawdon (15 December 1947 – 23 May 2011) was an English-born Australian actress and singer. She is known for her roles in TV serials Matlock Police (1971–1974), The Unisexers (1975) and A Country Practice (1980, 1985, 1992). In 1979 she won the Australian Film Institute Award for Best Actress in a Leading Role for Cathy's Child (1979) and Australian Film Institute Award for Best Lead Actress for a Telefeature for The Fish Are Safe (1986) in 1987. She died of an unspecified cancer.

== Early life ==
Michele Fawdon was born on 15 December 1947 in Harrow, London, as the oldest of three children of Yvonne and John Fawdon, a bomber pilot for BOAC. She had polio as a child and took ballet lessons to strengthen her leg. Some of Fawdon's childhood was spent based in Hong Kong, Singapore and Ghana.

Fawdon attended Bush Davies School of Theatre Arts, a theatrical boarding school in Sussex from the age of 12, and completed an examination by London Academy of Music and Dramatic Art. The Fawdons emigrated to Sydney in August 1964. She studied at the Ensemble Theatre for three years.

Her father had been a bomber pilot in WWII and trained pilots after the war until the family settled in Tamworth where he worked for the CSIRO cloud seeding.

== Career ==
Fawdon's first television role was an appearance in the fourth episode of the drama series, You Can't See 'Round Corners, which was broadcast from July 1967. In August of that year she took the role of Deanne in the comedy play, All Things Bright and Beautiful, at Ensemble Theatre. The Australian Jewish Times reviewer felt her performance was "outstanding" showing "certainty was matched by most of the other characters." She took the role of Elizabeth Green, a miner's wife, in the musical feature film, Stockade (December 1971), which is set in the era of the Eureka Stockade. From March to May of that year she acted in the play of the same name at the Independent Theatre.

The artist's breakthrough musical theatre role was as Mary Magdalene in the original Australian stage production of Jesus Christ Superstar from March to May 1972, which toured to Adelaide, West Melbourne, Launceston, Brisbane and Haymarket. According to Patricia Morgan of The Australian Women's Weekly, Fawdon is "a green-eyed blonde, aged 24. She is 5ft. 3in. [= 5.25 feet (160 cm)], ideally proportioned, and of pearl-cream complexion. In short, she's a stunner. She is also a singing actress who hasn't been out of work one day since she arrived from England." W. L. Hoffmann of The Canberra Times caught the premiere in Adelaide, "Fawdon was an appealing and musically excellent Mary Magdalene." She was recorded for the soundtrack album, Jesus Christ Superstar (Original Australian Cast Recording) (late 1972). In the following year Fawdon was replaced as Magdalene by Marcia Hines.

Fawdon's various television roles were in Matlock Police (1971, 1972, 1973, 1974), The Unisexers (1975), The Sullivans (1979), Cop Shop (1979, 1980), Young Ramsay (1980), and A Country Practice (1980, 1985, 1992). In the drama feature film, Cathy's Child (1979), she performed the theme song. For the role, the actress met and spoke with the Maltese-born, Australian resident Cathy Baikas, whom she portrays. She then "mixed with the Maltese community, working for a while in a clothing factory to get the feeling of the accent and the day-to-day concerns." At the 1979 Australian Film Institute Awards Fawdon won Best Actress in a Leading Role for Cathy's Child.

Fawdon played the role of Australian 19th-century painter Jane Sutherland in the July 1985 ABC-TV mini-series, One Summer Again, which focusses on the Heidelberg School of artists of the 1880s. Also in that year she starred in the feature film, Unfinished Business as Maureen, who is trying to get pregnant by her ex-boyfriend (John Clayton) as her husband (Norman Kaye) is sterile. It was directed by Bob Ellis. At the 1985 Australian Film Institute Awards she was nominated for Best Lead Actress for her role. Australian film critic, David Stratton, who first saw the film in 2012, observed, "I don't see [Clayton] as having been quite as good as [Ellis] thinks, but [Fawdon] was worthy of her AFI nom. And that's about it..."

In 1986 she portrayed Lena Ranger in the ABC-TV telemovie, The Fish Are Safe, which was directed by Noni Hazelhurst. For the role of Lena, Fawdon won the Australian Film Institute Award for Best Lead Actress for a Telefeature in 1987. In 1990 Fawdon appeared as Rose Peterson in the New Zealand film, The Rogue Stallion. She played Judge Cath in four episodes of Marshall Law (2002). Her last screen appearance was as Lorna Shanks in three episodes of Killing Time (2011).

== Personal life ==
Fawdon met her domestic partner, Geoff Jenkins, when both appeared in Manning Clark's History of Australia: The Musical in 1988. They had a child together in 1995. Michele Fawdon died on 23 May 2011, from cancer, aged 63.

== Filmography ==
=== Film ===
Title	Year	Role	Notes	Ref.
1971	Stockade	Elizabeth Green	Feature film (previously acted in the play version)	
1975	The Golden Cage	Guitar Player	Feature film	
1975	They Don't Clap Losers	Kay Lodge	Telemovie	
1978	Cass	Cass Willis	Telemovie. Wrote and sang "Compliments"	
1979	Cathy's Child	Cathy Baikas	Feature film. Sang theme song	
1980	...Maybe This Time	Margo	Feature film	
1985	Unfinished Business	Maureen	Feature film	
1986	The Fish Are Safe	Lena Ranner	Telemovie	
1987	Travelling North	Helen	Feature film	
1987	The Place at the Coast	Aunt Helen	Feature film	
1988	Captain Johnno	Kathleen	Telemovie	
1990	The Rogue Stallion	Rose Peterson	Telemovie	
2005	The Glenmoore Job	Beverley	Telemovie	

=== Television ===
Title	Year	Role	Notes	Ref.
1967	You Can't See 'Round Corners		TV series, 1 episode	
1972	Snake Gully with Dad and Dave	Mabel Smith	TV series, 1 episode	
1973–1974	Ryan	Susan Morrison / Mia Sinclair	TV series, 2 episodes	
1971–1974	Matlock Police	Lindy Smith / Mary / Toni Black / Betty Lee	TV series, 4 episodes	
1975	Homicide	Pam Dunn	TV series, 1 episode	
1975	The Unisexers	Monica Parry	TV series, all episodes	
1978	Loss of Innocence		TV miniseries	
1979–1980	Cop Shop	Heather Kendall / Cindy Carter	TV series, 5 episodes	
1980	Young Ramsay	Toni Fields	TV series, 1 episode	
1980–1992	A Country Practice	Barbara Walsh / Marge Owens / Dianne Klein	TV series, 6 episodes	
1981	Punishment	Susan Morrison	TV series	
1982	Spring & Fall	Laurie	TV series, 1 episode	
1984	Special Squad	Maggie	TV series, episode 36: "Return of the Cat"	
1985	One Summer Again	Jane Sutherland	TV miniseries, 3 episodes	
1985	Winners	Mrs. Doyle	TV series, 1 episode	
1987	The Flying Doctors	Ann Larson	TV series, 1 episode	
1988	Rafferty's Rules	Narelle Saxon	TV series, 1 episode	
1988	Australians	Melena Longford	TV miniseries, episode: "Lottie Lyell"	
1988	Joe Wilson	Hilda	TV miniseries, 3 episodes	
1989	Fields of Fire III	Iris	TV miniseries, 2 episodes	
1990	All the Rivers Run II	Ruth	TV miniseries, 2 episodes	
1992–1996	G.P.	Sister Bernice Eagan / Jean Taylor	TV series, 2 episodes	
1998–1999	All Saints	Paula Marchetti / Denise Baumann	TV series, 2 episodes	
1998; 2000	Water Rats	Joan Curtis / Mary Tully	TV series, 3 episodes	
2001	Blue Heelers	Shirley Wilkie	TV series, 1 episode	
2002	Marshall Law	Judge Cath	TV miniseries, 4 episodes	
2003	Stingers	Fran Hadley	TV series, 1 episode	
2003	MDA	Cynthia Morice	TV series, 2 episodes	
2004	Fergus McPhail	Mrs. Mobbs	TV series, 2 episodes	
2007	Bastard Boys	Lyn Tully	TV miniseries	
2009	City Homicide	Beverley Cowles	TV series, 1 episode	
2011	Killing Time	Lorna Shanks	TV miniseries, 3 episodes	

== Theatre ==
Year	Title	Role	Notes
1967	All Things Bright and Beautiful	Deanne	Ensemble Theatre, Sydney
1967; 1968	Generation		Ensemble Theatre, Sydney
1970	The Crucible	Mercy Lewis	Parade Theatre, Sydney
1971	Stockade	Elizabeth Green	Independent Theatre, Sydney
1972	Jesus Christ Superstar	Mary Magdalene	Australian tour with Harry M. Miller
1973	Flash Jim Vaux	Various roles	Russell St Theatre, Melbourne with MTC
1973; 1974	All My Sons	Juvenile lead	St Martins Theatre, Melbourne with MTC
1973; 1974	The Time Is Not Yet Ripe	Miss Perkins	Comedy Theatre, Melbourne with J. C. Williamson's & MTC
1975	The Travelling Kind		Marian St Theatre, Sydney
1975	The Cool Duenna		Marian St Theatre, Sydney
1976	Othello	Emilia	Princess Theatre, Launceston, Theatre Royal, Hobart with Tasmanian Theatre Company
1976	A Toast to Melba	Gladys Moncrieff / Madam Marchesi / Cockney Girl / The Little Boy	Tasmanian Theatre Company
1976	Kennedy's Children	Rona	Tasmanian Theatre Company
1976	The Season at Sarsaparilla	Mavis Knott	Sydney Opera House with Old Tote Theatre Company
1977	Obsessive Behaviour in Small Spaces	Maureen Macdonald	UNSW Old Tote Theatre, Sydney
1978	The Lady from Maxim’s	Clementine	Sydney Opera House
1979	The Golden Oldies	Esme / Dr Ellie	Jane St Theatre, Sydney
1980	Traitors	Anna	Nimrod, Sydney
1980	Backyard	Dorothy	Nimrod, Sydney
1980	Beauty and the Beast	Beauty	Sydney Opera House with STC
1981	Three Sisters	Irina Sergeyevna Prozorov	Nimrod, Sydney
1981	Teeth ‘n’ Smiles	Laura	Nimrod, Sydney
1981	Cloud Nine	Ellen / Lin	Nimrod, Sydney
1981	Tales from the Vienna Woods	Alfred's Grandmother / Others	Nimrod, Sydney
1982	Welcome the Bright World	Fay Ayalti / Gabriele	Nimrod, Sydney
1982	Burn Victim	Michele	Nimrod, Sydney
1982	Tristram Shandy		Nimrod, Sydney
1983	Uncle Vanya		Nimrod, Sydney
1983	Michele Fawdon in Cabaret	Solo performer	Kinselas Late Night Theatre
1983	The Pack of Women		Seymour Centre, Sydney, Universal Theatre, Melbourne, Space Theatre, Adelaide, ANU Canberra
1984	The Blind Giant Is Dancing	Louise Krause	Sydney Opera House with STC
1985; 1986	Jonah Jones	Clara Grimes	Wharf Theatre, Sydney, Playhouse, Adelaide with STC & STCSA
1987	A Chorus of Disapproval		Suncorp Theatre, Brisbane with QTC
1987	Away	Vic	Sydney Opera House with STC
1988	Manning Clark's History of Australia – The Musical	Dymphna Clark / Rose / Miss Macarthur	Princess Theatre, Melbourne
1988	Summer of the Seventeenth Doll / Away	Olive / Vic	Pepsico Summerfare, New York with STC
1989	Lost Weekend	Zelda	Space Theatre, Adelaide with STCSA
1990	Mrs Klein	Paula	Marian Street Theatre, Sydney with Northside Theatre Company
1990	Development Site	Various roles	Sydney Theatre Company
1990	Hot Fudge and Icecream	Ruby / Various roles	Wharf Theatre, Sydney with STC
1990	Beach Blanket Tempest	Regine	Q Theatre, Penrith
1991	Twelfth Night	Maria	Q Theatre, Penrith
1991	Summer of the Seventeenth Doll	Olive	Seymour Centre, Sydney
1991	Kenny's Coming Home		Q Theatre, Penrith
1992	Carnival in Kingaroy	Mrs Highfields	Cremorne Theatre, Brisbane with QTC

== Awards ==
Year	Work	Award	Category	Result
1979	Cathy's Child	AFI Award	Best Actress in a Leading Role	Won
1979	Cathy's Child	Sammy Award	Best Actress	Won
1980	The Silent Cry	Sammy Award	Best Actress	Won
1980	Maybe This Time	AFI Award	Best Actress in a Supporting Role	Nominated
1985	Unfinished Business	AFI Award	Best Actress in a Leading Role	Nominated
1987	The Fish are Safe	AFI Award	Best Lead Actress in a Telefeature	Won
