= Vichea Ten =

Australian actor

- Born: ~1963; Cambodia
- Occupation: Actor
- Notable work: In Between

Vichea Ten is a Cambodian born Australian actor. For his performance in In Between he was nominated for the 1987 Australian Film Institute Award for Best Performance by an Actor in a Leading Role in a Mini Series. He played the character of Saret, an illegal immigrant who fled Kampuchea after Pol Pot took power.

Vichea was born in Cambodia where his parents and two siblings died after the Khmer Rouge took power. After escaping from Cambodia when Vietnam invaded he went to a refugee camp in Thailand for three years and was then sponsored to Australia by two of his sisters.
