= The Place at the Coast =

- Directed by: George Ogilvie
- Screenplay by: Hilary Furlong
- Based on: The Place at the Coast by Jane Hyde
- Produced by: Hilary Furlong
- Starring: John Hargreaves; Heather Mitchell; Tushka Bergen
- Cinematography: Jeff Darling
- Edited by: Nicholas Beauman
- Music by: Chris Neal
- Release date: 17 September 1987
- Running time: 111 min
- Country: Australia
- Language: English
- Budget: A$2.4 million
- Box office: A$57,400 (Australia)

The Place at the Coast is a 1987 Australian drama film directed by George Ogilvie and starring John Hargreaves. Given the working title "The Bee Eater", it was based on an unpublished novel by Jane Hyde, provisionally called "At Kilkee" but subsequently published with the same name as the film.

== Plot ==
Young Ellie McAdam's passion and shelter is the pristine landscape surrounding the village of Kilkee on the Australian east coast where she and her father Neil, an abstracted widower, spend peaceful holidays in a ramshackle beach house disrupted by visits from their obstreperous extended family. When Neil is blinded by the sudden rediscovery of love, Ellie finds herself isolated in her opposition to a development that will destroy the landscape forever.

== Cast ==
- John Hargreaves as Neil McAdam
- Heather Mitchell as Margot Ryan
- Tushka Bergen as Ellie McAdam
- Julie Hamilton as Enid Burroughs
- Aileen Britton as Gran
- Willie Fennell as Fred Ryan
- Michele Fawdon as Aunt Helen
- Lillian Crombie as Mrs Lundy

== Nominations ==
Australian Film Institute Awards

- Australian Film Institute Award for Best Screenplay - Hilary Furlong
- Australian Film Institute Award for Best Actress in a Supporting Role - Julie Hamilton
- Australian Film Institute Award for Best Achievement in Production Design - Owen Paterson
- Australian Film Institute Award for Best Costume Design - Anna French
