= Broken Highway =

1993 film

- Directed by: Laurie McInnes
- Written by: Laurie McInnes
- Produced by: Richard Mason
- Starring: Aden Young
- Cinematography: Steve Mason
- Edited by: Gary Hillberg
- Release date: May 1993
- Running time: 98 minutes
- Country: Australia
- Language: English
- Budget: A$1.35 million
- Box office: A$18,300 (Australia)

Broken Highway is a 1993 Australian drama film directed by Laurie McInnes. It was entered into the 1993 Cannes Film Festival.

== Cast ==
- Aden Young as Angel
- David Field as Tatts
- Bill Hunter as Wilson
- Claudia Karvan as Catherine
- Norman Kaye as Elias Kidd
- William McInnes as Roger
- Stephen Davis as Jack
- Dennis Miller as Max O'Donnell
- Kris McQuade as Woman

== Production ==
Laurie McInnes made the short film Palisade which won the Palme d'Or at Cannes. She got development money from the Australian Film Commission to write a script. The film was shot from 25 May to 10 July 1992.

== Box office ==
Broken Highway grossed $18,300 at the box office in Australia.

== See also ==
- Cinema of Australia
