= James Clayden =

Australian painter and film director

James Clayden is an Australian director and painter based in Melbourne.

== Selected credits ==
- Before Monday (1971) - Super 8
- Antarctica (1972) - 60 minutes, Super 8
- Persona (1973) - 15 minutes, Super 8
- More than Ever (1973) - 20 minutes, Super 8
- Workstitle (1975) - 90 minutes, Super 8
- Corpse (1982) - 111 minutes
- The Hour Before My Brother Dies (1986) - feature
- With Time to Kill (1987) - feature
- Hamlet X (2004) - feature
