= Two Friends (1986 film) =

Film by Jane Campion

- DVD cover
- Written by: Helen Garner
- Directed by: Jane Campion
- Starring: Kris Bidenko; Emma Coles
- Theme music composer: Martin Armiger
- Country of origin: Australia
- Original language: English

Production
- Producer: Jan Chapman
- Cinematography: Julian Penney
- Editor: Bill Russo
- Running time: 76 minutes

Two Friends (stylized as 2 Friends) is a 1986 Australian television drama film directed by Jane Campion. It was screened in the Un Certain Regard section at the 1986 Cannes Film Festival. The film is Campion’s first feature as a director.

== Plot ==
The film begins in the present and works backward in time to show how Louise and Kelly, once inseparable best friends, grew apart over the course of a year. Louise is a studious high school student and has a typical love-hate relationship with her divorced mother. Kelly, who has bleached hair and identifies with the punk style, lives with friends at the beach and experiments with drugs and casual relationships. The film progressively shows the subtle changes that set the two girls on different paths.

== Cast ==
- Kris Bidenko as Kelly
- Emma Coles as Louise
- Kris McQuade as Janet, Louise's mother
- Peter Hehir as Malcolm
- Kerry Dwyer as Alison
- Stephen Leeder as Jim
- Debra May as Chris, Kelly's mother
- John Sheerin as Dead Girl's Father
- Sean Travers as Matthew
- Emily Stocker as Soula
- Lynne Murphy as School Principal
- Giovanni Marangoni as Renato
- Benny Ulizzi as Sam
- Rory Delaney as Wally
- Tony Barry as Charlie
- Steve Bisley as Kevin
- Denise Roberts as Jessie

== Release ==
The film was selected to screen in the Un Certain Regard section at the 1986 Cannes Film Festival. It later aired as a telefilm on Australian TV on 26 September 1986. The film was also given a two-week limited theatrical run in New York on 24 April 1996.

== Reception ==
The film was positively reviewed and has a rating of 100% based on eight reviews on website Rotten Tomatoes. Writing of the 1996 US theatrical release, critic Alison Macor of The Austin Chronicle wrote Two Friends is “a spare film with complex and subtly developed relationships…[and] features nuanced performances that suggest the more developed characterizations that resound so effectively in Campion's acclaimed later films Angel at My Table and The Piano.”

In a retrospective essay for Senses of Cinema, Gwendolyn Audrey Foster wrote, “What makes the film so remarkable is the depth of feeling that inhabits the work. Campion doesn’t miss the smallest detail, from telephone calls that go on too long; to bullying by students at school; to other, minor characters whose fates we will ever know; parents who have no idea who their child really is.”

=== Accolades ===
The film won three 1987 AACTA Awards including "Best Telefeature" category for producer Jan Chapman, "Best Achievement in direction in a telefeature" for Jane Campion, and "Best Screenplay in a Telefeature" for Helen Garner. Emma Coles and Kris McQuade were both nominated in the category of "Best Performance by an Actress in a Telefeature.”
