= The Fish Are Safe =

- Written by: Deb Parsons
- Directed by: Noni Hazlehurst
- Starring: Michele Fawdon; Peter Cummins
- Country of origin: Australia
- Original language: English

Production
- Running time: 75 mins
- Production company: Australian Broadcasting Corporation

Original release
- Release: November 1986

The Fish Are Safe is a 1986 Australian TV movie directed by Noni Hazlehurst.

== Plot ==
The romantic adventures of Lena Ranner a 34-year-old freelance graphic artist and a somewhat cranky, 60-year-old builder called Ned Foley.

== Cast ==
- Michele Fawdon as Lena Ranner
- Peter Cummins as Ned Foley

== Production ==
It was filmed March–May 1986. Hazlehurst said it was a "lovely script" and being asked to direct was "a great honour".
