= Rebel Penfold-Russell =

Australian film producer, actress and heiress

- Born: Australia
- Occupation(s): Film producer, actress
- Notable work: The Adventures of Priscilla, Queen of the Desert

Rebel Penfold-Russell is an Australian film producer, actress, and Penfolds family heiress.

She was the executive producer of movies such as Frauds, The Adventures of Priscilla, Queen of the Desert and Paws. She owns her own production company, Rebelstudio, which was formerly called Latent Image.

She has had a number of small roles in various television series and films, such as Shoestring, Prisoner, Emerald City and Easy Virtue.

In 2009, she was awarded the O.A.M. (Order of Australia Medal) in the Queen's New Years Honours List for her services to the community, particularly through philanthropic support for the arts and a range of charitable organizations.
