= Rhonda Wilson (actress) =

Australian actress, theatre director, author

- Occupations: Actress, Theatre Director, Oral Historian, Author
- Years active: 1978-2005

Rhonda Wilson is an Australian actress, theatre director and author. For her performance in The Hour Before My Brother Dies she was nominated for the 1987 Australian Film Institute Award for Best Lead Actress in a Telefeature, a role she was reprising from the earlier stage production.

Wilson is a stage actress and director, often working with Daniel Keene with whom she cofounded Tide Theatre. Stage shows include Angels Tomorrow, The Hour Before My Brother Dies, All Souls, Low, Blood Sister and Echoes of Ruby Dark.

Additionally, she performed various plays in New York City for which she received critical acclaim, including The Hour Before My Brother Dies, Estrella, The Fighter and Isle of Swans.

Her Directorial work includes All Souls at the Malthouse Theatre, Silent Partner at the George Fairfax Theatre at the Victorian Arts Centre, The Snake Pit at The Church Theatre, Isle of Swans at Westside Arts Theatre (NYC) and The Fighter at the Theatre for the New City in New York, which she directed under the name Iris James.

Wilson is a Oral Historian. Her Oral History book "Good Talk: The Extraordinary Lives Of Ten Ordinary Australian Women" (Penguin, 1985) was nominated for the Victorian Premier’s Prize in Australian Studies. Additionally, she researched and edited "Shelter: An Oral History of Majorie Oke Rooming House for Women" (Black Pepper Publishing, 2007), which was also nominated for the Victorian premiere's prize in Australian studies.

She has also self-published her novel The Intended Head (Self-published, 2024).

== Filmography ==
=== Film ===
Year	Title	Role	Type
1986	The Hour Before My Brother Dies		TV movie

== Stage ==
Year	Title	Role	Type
	Angels Tomorrow		
	The Hour Before My Brother Dies		
	All Souls and Low		
	Estrella		
	Isle of Swans		
	The Snake Pit		
	Echoes of Ruby Dark		
	Blood Sister		
	Low		

== Direction ==
Year	Title	Role	Type
	All Souls		
	Silent Partner		
	The Snake Pit		
	The Fighter		
	Isle of Swans		

== Books ==
Year	Title	Role	Type
1985	Good Talk		
2007	Shelter		
2024	The Indented Head		
