= The Hour Before My Brother Dies =

- Based on: play by Daniel Keene
- Written by: Daniel Keene
- Directed by: James Clayden
- Starring: Peter Hehir; Rhonda Wilson; Reg Evans
- Country of origin: Australia
- Original language: English

Production
- Producer: Noel Price
- Production company: ABC

Original release
- Network: ABC
- Release: 3 October 1986

The Hour Before My Brother Dies is a 1986 Australian telemovie.

== Plot ==
Sally visits her brother Martin in prison where he awaits execution for murder. During the visit, the two are quickly drawn back to a hot summer's New Year's Eve night of many years ago.

== Cast ==
- Peter Hehir
- Rhonda Wilson
- Reg Evans

== Production ==
The film was based on Daniel Keene's 1986 play of the same name.

== Reception ==
The Age's Barbara Hooks wrote "I was often intrigued, but also often fidgety. It is all so intense, passionate and drawn out that when Rhonda Wilson put on her coat to leave, the response was relief, as if she was a visitor who had begun to outstay her welcome. I could, however, only admire the strength of the performances." Anna Murdoch of the Age gave it a positive review writing "There are a lot of fine things about The Hour Before My Brother Dies, the most important being its atmosphere, and an undeniable sexual chemistry between Hehir and Wilson. The language is powerful and well delivered." Garrie Hutchinson, also in the Age, calls it "one of the most absorbing pieces of television made in this country." The Sydney Morning Herald's Yvette Steinhauer says "Emotions frequently reach snapping point and both Wilson and Hehir excel in their demanding roles wherein each word is laden with pent-up aggression and recriminations."
