= Max Stuart =

Indigenous Australian convicted of murder in 1959 (c.1932–2014)

Rupert Maxwell (Max) Stuart (c. 1932 (Note: No birth records exist and Stuart believed he was 27 years of age when arrested.) – 21 November 2014) was an Indigenous Australian who was convicted of murder in 1959. His conviction was subject to several appeals to higher courts, the Judicial Committee of the Privy Council, and a Royal Commission, all of which upheld the verdict. Newspapers campaigned successfully against the death sentence being imposed. After serving his sentence, Stuart became an Arrernte elder and from 1998 till 2001 was the chairman of the Central Land Council. In 2002, the feature film Black and White was made about the Stuart case.

== Early life ==
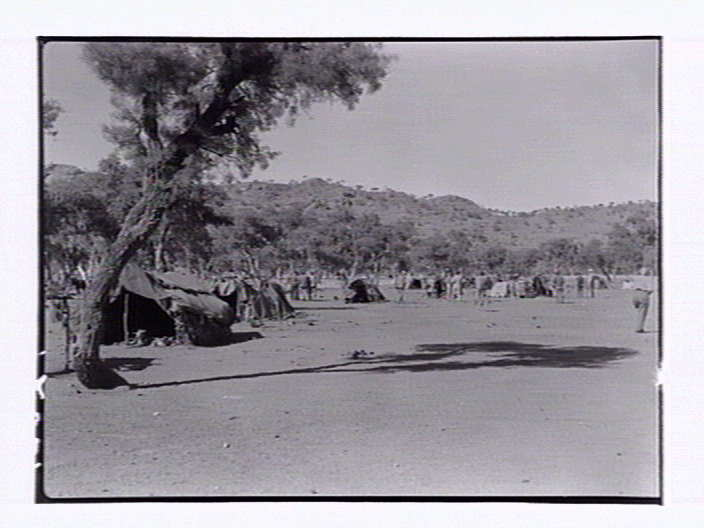
Jay Creek in 1947

Stuart was born at Jay Creek in the MacDonnell Ranges, 45 kilometres west of Alice Springs in the Northern Territory, probably in 1932. It was a government settlement which for a time in the late 1920s and early 1930s included 45 children from a home named "The Bungalow" (37 of whom were under the age of 12) who were all temporarily housed in a corrugated shed, with a superintendent and matron housed separately in two tents. Jay Creek was home to the Western Arrernte people. In 1937, Jay Creek was declared one of three permanent camps or reserves for the Alice Springs Indigenous population. It was intended as a buffer between the semi-nomadic people living in far western regions and the more sophisticated inhabitants of Alice Springs and environs, in particular for the non-working, aged and infirm around Alice Springs.

Legally, Stuart was a "half-caste" (Note: As per the past uses of the terms "half caste" and "part Aboriginal" in Australian law. They are today considered offensive and no longer used.) as one of his maternal great-grandfathers had been a white station owner. Stuart's paternal grandfather had been a fully initiated Arrernte and leader of a totemic clan. His father, Paddy Stuart, was also fully initiated, but as he had assumed an English surname and worked on cattle stations had not had all the secret traditions passed on to him. Max Stuart himself was fully initiated which, in 1950s Australia, was very rare for an Indigenous Australian who worked with white people. Although his sister attended the mission school, Stuart refused and had very little "western" education or knowledge of Western religion. At the age of 11, Stuart left home to work as a stockman around Alice Springs. As a teenager, he went on to work as a bare-knuckle boxer and for Jimmy Sharman's boxing tents. In late 1958, he was working on the sideshows of a travelling fun fair. He was mostly illiterate and had problems with alcohol.

In late 1957, Stuart had been convicted of indecently assaulting a sleeping nine-year-old girl in Cloncurry, Queensland. In that case, he had covered his victim's mouth to prevent her screaming when she awoke; he confessed to police that he "knew this was wrong" but he did not "know any big women", and that when he had liquor he could not control himself.

== The crime ==
On Saturday 20 December 1958, Mary Olive Hattam, a nine-year-old girl, disappeared near the South Australian town of Ceduna (pop: 1,200), 768 km (477 mi) from Adelaide. Hattam had been playing on the beach between Ceduna and Thevenard with her brother Peter and their friend Peter Jacobsen. The two boys had left at 2:30 pm to collect a tub to use as a boat but had been distracted and failed to return. At 3:45 pm Jacobsen's father, who had been fishing, pulled his boat up at the beach where Hattam had been playing but there was no sign of her. Hattam's father went to the beach at 4 pm to collect her and then called on some neighbours to help search without success. As evening fell, Roger Cardwell, who ran the local deli and was married to Mary's cousin, (Note: Roger Cardwell was later to become a newsreader for NWS9, and went on to win the Logie Award in 1978 and 1981 for most popular television personality in South Australia.) alerted the local police and Ceduna citizens, who were watching Dial M for Murder in the local Memorial Hall. The film was stopped mid reel, a search commenced and Hattam's body was found in a small cave at 12.30 am. According to the attending doctor she had been raped, mutilated and murdered between 2.30 pm and 8 pm. At 10:30 am, the local police brought in a "black tracker" Sonny Jim, who followed tracks from Hattam's body to a nearby rockpool then back to the body, suggesting the murderer had washed off Mary's blood. He then followed tracks 3 km (1.9 mi) to where a travelling funfair, "Fun Land Carnival", had been on the previous day. The following day police brought to the site another black tracker, Harry Scott, who came to the same conclusions as Sonny Jim. Both trackers claimed that the footprints had been made by a member of a Northern Australian tribe who had spent some time living with white people.

The local Aboriginal community lived at the Lutheran mission at Koonibba, around 40 km (25 mi) from Ceduna. As there was little work near Koonibba, many families had moved to a block of land near Thevenard, where around 200 people lived in bark huts. Many had visited the funfair and were questioned by police. Several suspects were brought to the beach but were discounted from being responsible for the footprints by the trackers.

=== Suspect ===
The 27-year-old Rupert Max Stuart, an Arrernte man, and teenager Alan Moir had been in Ceduna on 20 December, running the darts stall for the funfair operated by Mr and Mrs Norman Gieseman. Both had gone out drinking during the day and Moir returned late that night, losing consciousness several times due to intoxication. Stuart had been arrested for drinking alcohol at 9:30 pm and was in police custody. This was because, at the time, "full-blooded" Aboriginal people were forbidden by law to drink alcohol. In 1953 a federal ordinance had been passed that permitted "half-castes" to drink, but they were required to apply for a "certificate of exemption". These were commonly referred to as "dog licences" by Aboriginal people. Stuart had been jailed on more than one occasion for supplying alcohol to "full-bloods". The ban was rarely enforced in rural towns. However, since 1958, Ceduna had been combating a perceived alcohol-related "native problem" and was enforcing the alcohol ban. Although he was not drunk, Stuart had not renewed his certificate, and when arrested for drinking, was facing a sentence of 6 to 18 months in jail. He was released without charge as police resources were being dedicated to the Hattam investigation.

When Stuart returned to the fair after being released the next morning, he had an argument with the Giesemans over getting 15-year-old Moir drunk and was fired. News of the murder had not reached the funfair, which packed up on Sunday morning and moved on to Whyalla, where police interviewed the workers that night. Police interviewed Moir, who claimed that he and Stuart had been drinking with several "half-castes" in Ceduna on Saturday morning. He had returned to the funfair at 10 am then left again at 1 pm. He told police he had seen Stuart, drunk, outside the Memorial Hall with "some other darkies". Police contacted Ceduna to question Stuart about the murder.

== The Stuart case ==
When picked up on Monday, Stuart was working for the Australian Wheat Board at Thevenard, 3 kilometres southwest of Ceduna. During interrogation, Stuart admitted being drunk and travelling from Ceduna to Thevenard on Saturday afternoon but denied the murder. Police took him outside and made him walk barefoot across sand, after which the two trackers confirmed that Stuart's tracks matched those on the beach. Stuart later confessed and, although he could not read or write, signed his typed confession with the only English he knew, his name, written in the block letters that had been taught him by his sister, misspelling his first name as "ROPERT".

Following his confession, Stuart was brought to trial in the Supreme Court of South Australia, with the case opening on 20 April 1959. The judge presiding was Sir Geoffrey Reed, an experienced judge; Stuart's lawyer was J.D. O'Sullivan, assigned to him by the Law Society of South Australia. When arrested, Stuart had only four shillings and sixpence halfpenny ($0.45) and was thus unable to contribute to the cost of his defence. The Law Society had few resources and was unable to pay for many of the out of pocket expenses required for the defence case, such as checking Stuart's alibi, conducting forensic tests and consulting expert witnesses. (Note: In other states, a solicitor would have been appointed as public defender for a person who could not afford to defend himself. The state government was at that time responsible for the solicitor's salary and for providing funds for out of pocket expenses. In 1933, the law society had replaced the public solicitor in South Australia, and provided defendants with solicitors who volunteered to take a case for no fee. In 1959, the law society had a budget of £5,000 for administration and provided solicitors for more than 1,000 defendants who were required to pay their own out of pocket expenses.)

It was claimed the footprints found on the beach matched those of Stuart. A taxi driver testified that he had driven Stuart to the murder scene on the afternoon of the crime. Hairs belonging to the murderer had been found in the victim's hand and had been visually compared to Stuart's by police. The hairs from the crime scene were introduced as evidence, but no attempt was made by either the prosecution or defence to match them to Stuart's own hair (the hairs have since been destroyed so cannot now be tested). The case against Stuart relied almost entirely on his confession to the police. Stuart had asked to make a statement from the dock but he could not, as he was unable to read the statement prepared from his version of events. Permission for a court official to read the statement on his behalf was refused, so Stuart was only able to make a short statement in pidgin English: "I cannot read or write. Never been to school. I did not see the little girl. Police hit me, choke me. Make me said these words. They say I kill her." This led the prosecutor to claim that Stuart's failure to give evidence was proof of guilt. Stuart had no choice but to refuse to testify. Under South Australian law, Stuart's prior criminal history could not be brought before the court as it was prejudicial. There were two exceptions: if a defendant under oath presents witnesses for his own good character or impugns the character of a prosecution witness, the prosecution is entitled to cross examine the defendant and present evidence to prove his bad character. As Stuart's defence was that police had beaten him then fabricated his confession, to state this under oath would allow the prosecution to present his prior criminal history, including the Cloncurry assault, to the jury.

O'Sullivan suggested that police had forced Stuart into the confession, due to Stuart's poor command of the English language. However, the jury was unconvinced by the argument and Stuart was convicted. In line with the law, Judge Reed sentenced Stuart to death on 24 April 1959. Stuart's application for leave to appeal to the Supreme Court of South Australia was rejected in May 1959. His appeal to the High Court of Australia in June 1959 also failed, although the High Court observed that "certain features of this case have caused us some anxiety."

The prison chaplain was unable to communicate with Stuart due to his limited command of English and called in Catholic priest Father Tom Dixon who spoke fluent Arrernte due to having worked on mission stations. Dixon was suspicious about the sophisticated upper class English used in the alleged confession, for example: "The show was situated at the Ceduna Oval." Stuart's native language was Arrernte, he was uneducated, could not read and only spoke a slightly advanced pidgin Arrernte-English known as Northern Territory English. Anthropologist and linguist Ted Strehlow, who had been brought up in Arrernte society and had known Stuart since childhood, also had doubts. After visiting Stuart at Dixon's request on 18 May, Strehlow translated Stuart's alibi from his native tongue. Stuart claimed that he had taken Blackburn's taxi to the Thevenard hotel where he had paid an Aboriginal woman £4 for sex and had remained there until arrested that night. Strehlow also tested Stuart's English.{[efn|1=Strehlow found Stuart's English would appear to be boring and rambling to a native English speaker. Northern Territory people are often vague about dates and clock time, leading them to include unnecessary detail when describing an event. For example, in Stuart's alibi, he frequently interrupted his narrative with long word-for-word accounts of conversations he had had, despite them being totally irrelevant and of no interest. Northern Territory English also has idiomatic characteristics. "He" and "she" always follows the noun as in "that man he told me" instead of "that man told me". Also "the" is not used before nouns and "them" is used instead of "those". The police confession in contrast was grammatically correct, laid out in logical order with only detail of use to a court. Strehlow also pointed out the use of words not used in pidgin such as "awoke", "unconscious" and "raped". He later swore an affidavit to the effect that the confession could not be genuine, enabling the appeal to the High Court. Ken Inglis, then a lecturer at the University of Adelaide, wrote in July 1959 of the doubts of Father Dixon and Ted Strehlow in the Nation, a fortnightly magazine. There was further reporting on the case in The Sydney Morning Herald and then Adelaide afternoon newspaper, The News, took up the issue.

Had police claimed the typed confession summarised what Stuart had said there would have been little controversy; however, the six policemen who had interrogated Stuart testified under oath that the document was Stuart's "literal and exact confession, word for word." One of the policemen who interrogated Stuart, chief inspector Paul Turner, stated on his deathbed in 2001 that police had "jollied" and joked the confession out of Stuart, and that once they had it, they bashed him. Fellow police officers denied Turner's claims, and insisted that the confession was verbatim, "Yes, we altered it a bit....but the substance is Stuart's." Stuart's guilt is still debated.

Stuart's execution date was set for Tuesday, 7 July 1959, and the Executive Council, chaired by Premier Thomas Playford, was due to sit on 6 July to reply to any petitions presented. The Advertiser had devoted all its correspondence pages to Stuart with 75% of writers in favour of commutation. Petitions with thousands of signatures supporting commutation had already been received, but that morning the first petition supporting the execution arrived by telegram. The petition, circulated in Ceduna, Thevenard and the surrounding districts had 334 signatures. The Executive Council sat at 12:30 pm and considered the petitions for 20 minutes before issuing a statement: "The prisoner is left for execution in the due course of the law. No recommendation is made for pardon or reprieve." Stuart was told of the decision and given a cigarette. He was then informed that the execution would take place at 8 am the following morning. Father Dixon was requested to keep Stuart calm and he visited him that night. Asked if he was afraid, Stuart replied he would not be if Dixon stayed through the night, and Dixon agreed to do so. Not long after, Stuart was informed that during the afternoon, O'Sullivan had lodged an appeal to the Privy Council in London and Justice Reed had issued a 14-day stay; this appeal also failed, however.

== Royal Commission ==
By the time the Privy Council had rejected Stuart's appeal, Father Dixon had questioned the funfair workers, none of whom had appeared at the trial, and had returned with statements from Mr and Mrs Gieseman and one of the workers, Betty Hopes. This led to a petition demanding that the death sentence be carried out but the controversy forced Premier Thomas Playford IV to call a Royal Commission.

In August 1959 a Royal Commission, the Royal Commission in Regard to Rupert Max Stuart, was convened by the South Australian government. The Commission was appointed to enquire into matters raised in statutory declarations regarding Stuart's actions and intentions, his movements on 20 December 1958, and why the information in the declarations had not been raised in the Supreme Court or another authority before the declarations were made, and the circumstances in which the declarations were obtained and made. Before the commission, Stuart presented an alibi that his defence had never raised at the trial, that he had been working at the funfair when the crime was committed.

The Commissioners declared that the suggestion that police had intimidated Stuart into signing the confession was "quite unacceptable", and on 3 December 1959, the Commission concluded that Stuart's conviction was justified.

== Campaigns against death sentence ==
On 22 June 1959, Father Dixon contacted Charles Duguid, who ran the Aborigines' Advancement League, to discuss Stuart's situation. On 27 June, a meeting of the League, university teachers, clergymen and representative of the Howard League for Penal Reform was held in Duguid's Magill home, where Dixon and Strehlow spoke to the meeting. It was decided to mount a campaign to keep Stuart alive, and the distribution of petitions for commutation of sentence was arranged. The meeting was mentioned in a small report in The News, an afternoon newspaper, but didn't mention the participants. On 30 June, the morning newspaper, The Advertiser, printed a letter expressing concern over Stuart's conviction. On 1 June, The News printed a small story with the headline, Petitioners Run a Race with Death. By now supporters and opponents of the death penalty were debating in the two newspapers' Letter to the editor sections, but there was little concern expressed over Stuart himself.

When H. V. Evatt, federal leader of the opposition, intervened, the news was featured on the front page of the 3 July edition of The News. The campaign so far had been for commutation, but Evatt argued for a retrial. Printed alongside Evatt's statement on the front page was one by the South Australian Police Association intended, it said, to inform the public "of the real facts". This statement claimed that Stuart was not illiterate and spoke "impeccable English". It also claimed that Stuart was legally classified as a white man and cited a record of offences that are not offences when committed by an Aboriginal person. It also recounted a trial in Darwin where Stuart had defended himself, personally cross-examined witnesses in English, and given evidence himself. O'Sullivan, Stuart's solicitor, wrote a reply refuting the Police Association claims; this was published the next day, citing the fact that Stuart's police record included seven convictions for "Being an Aborigine, did drink liquor", and pointing out that the President of the Police Association was Detective Sgt. Paul Turner, the most senior of the six policemen who had obtained Stuart's contested confession. The Law Society expressed outrage and stated that the Police Association statement bordered on contempt of court and would prejudice any jury hearing a future appeal. The Society strongly suggested the government fund a further appeal to the United Kingdom Privy Council. O'Sullivan was denied access to records of Stuart's trials to check the English that Turner claimed Stuart had used, and the government also refused to prevent Turner from commenting publicly on the case. As a result, the Sunday Mail (then a joint enterprise of The News and The Advertiser) printed prominently on its front page O'Sullivan's "suspicion" that the government was determined to hang Stuart and was supporting the Police Association in order to do so.

The Police Association statement, and later comments from Turner including that Stuart had conducted English classes for prisoners while in Alice Springs Gaol, were widely condemned and are credited with prompting the appeal to the Privy Council, putting the Stuart case in the newspaper headlines, and keeping it there.

Two of the commissioners appointed by Premier Playford, Chief Justice Mellis Napier and Justice Geoffrey Reed, had been involved in the case, Napier as presiding judge in the Full Court appeal and Reed as the trial judge, leading to considerable worldwide controversy, with claims of bias from sources such as the president of the Indian Bar Council, the leader of the United Kingdom Liberal Party, Jo Grimond, and former British Prime Minister Clement Attlee. Labor Party MP Don Dunstan asked questions in parliament and played a major role in Premier Playford's decision to commute Stuart's sentence to life imprisonment. Playford's daughter, Margaret Fereday, recalled arguing with him on the issue, calling him a "murderer". Playford gave no reason for his decision, and the case was one of the principal events leading to the fall of the Playford government in 1965.

The News, edited by Rohan Rivett (Note: Rohan Rivett is the grandson of Australia's second Prime Minister, Alfred Deakin.) and owned by Rupert Murdoch, campaigned heavily against Stuart's death sentence. Because of the campaign through The News, Rivett, as editor, and The News itself, were charged in 1960 with seditious and malicious libel, with Premier Playford describing the coverage as "the gravest libel ever made against any judge in this State". John Bray, later chief justice and chancellor of the University of Adelaide, represented Rivett. The jury determined that the defendants had not committed an offence, and the remaining charges were withdrawn. A few weeks later, Murdoch dismissed Rivett. Rivett had been editor-in-chief of The News since 1951.

It has been suggested that in Black and White, a 2002 film of the case, the role of Murdoch was magnified, and the part of his editor, Rivett, was minimised. However, it was noted in the Royal Commission that Murdoch wrote editorials, headlines and posters for the campaign and paid for costs of the investifation, including airfares. Murdoch himself believed Stuart guilty: "There's no doubt that Stuart didn't get a totally fair trial. Although it's probable that he was guilty, I thought this at the time. In those days – although less so now – I was very much against the death penalty." Bruce Page, Murdoch's biographer, said the case was pivotal in his career. "It was the very brief period of Rupert's radicalism, which was a very good thing for Stuart, as it got him out of the hangman's noose. Murdoch galloped into action, but it was a bad fight for him. The truth is it scared him off from ever taking on governments again. He reverted to his father's pattern of toeing the line."

Stuart says of Murdoch that "He done a good one in my case" and also, "He wanted the truth, you know. I could see him out in the court. I was with the policemen; my lawyer told me it was him."

== Imprisonment ==
Stuart was released on parole in 1973. He was then in and out of jail for breaking provisions of his parole that banned consumption of alcohol until 1984, when he was paroled from Adelaide's Yatala Labour Prison for the sixth and final time. During his time at Yatala Prison, Stuart learned proper English, became literate, began painting in watercolours and acquired other work skills. When visiting him in 1972, journalist Stewart Cockburn asked him to sign a piece of paper, Stuart wrote, "I can write very good now." Cockburn pasted that note into his copy of Inglis' The Stuart Case. In between being returned to prison a number of times for breaches of his parole between 1974 and 1984, he married and settled at Santa Teresa, a Catholic mission south-east of Alice Springs.

== Significance of the case ==
Human rights lawyer Geoffrey Robertson QC said of the case:

It was a dramatic and very important case because it alerted Australia to the difficulties that Aborigines, who then weren't even counted in the census, encountered in our courts. It alerted us to the appalling feature of capital punishment of the death sentence that applied to people who may well be innocent.

== Indigenous politics ==
In 1985, Patrick Dodson, then director of the Central Land Council, appointed Stuart to a part-time job. This appointment transformed Stuart, giving him respect and giving rise to his successful rehabilitation. Stuart shared his knowledge of Aboriginal law and tradition, which he had gained from his grandfather as a youth, and became an Arrernte elder.

Stuart subsequently became an active figure in Central Australian Aboriginal affairs, in particular with the Lhere Artepe native title organisation.

Stuart was chairman of the Central Land Council (CLC) from 1998 to 2001. In 2000, as chairman of the CLC, Stuart welcomed the Queen to Alice Springs and made a presentation to her. in September 2001, Stuart was cultural director of the Yeperenye Federation Festival. In 2004, Stuart was the Public Officer for the CANCA Aboriginal Corporation, a role derived from his employment with the Central Land Council.

== Publications on the case ==
Books on the case were written by Ken Inglis, one of the first to publicise the doubts about the case; Sir Roderic Chamberlain, the crown prosecutor; and Father Tom Dixon, the priest who raised concerns about Stuart's confession.

- Inglis, K. S. (2002) [1961]. The Stuart Case (2nd ed.). Melbourne, Australia: Black Inc. ISBN 1-86395-243-8.
- Chamberlain, Roderic (1973). The Stuart Affair. London: Hale. ISBN 0-7091-4097-5.
- Dixon, Thomas Sidney (1987). The Wizard of Alice : Father Dixon and the Stuart Case. Morwell, Victoria, Australia: Alella Books. ISBN 0-949681-18-0.

== Docudrama ==
The first chapter of the 1993 four-part Blood Brothers documentary series, Broken English – The Conviction of Max Stuart was directed by Ned Lander. It is a docudrama which contains interviews with key figures in the Stuart case that alternates with dramatised recreations. Lawrence Turner plays Max Stuart with Hugo Weaving, Noah Taylor and Tony Barry co-starring.

Originally intended to be a documentary on the case based around Father Tom Dixon, Dixon died during production and the film was restructured as a docudrama. Historian Ken Inglis, who participated in the Stuart case as a journalist and wrote an account of the trial and appeals, praised the documentary as accurate, but noted that "anything which could have suggested that Stuart was guilty... was left out of the film." The weight of evidence, he said, tilted toward guilt rather than innocence.

== Film ==
The 2002 feature film Black and White, directed by Craig Lahiff, was made about his case, and featured David Ngoombujarra as Max Stuart; Robert Carlyle as Stuart's lawyer David O'Sullivan; Charles Dance as the Crown Prosecutor Roderic Chamberlain; Kerry Fox as O'Sullivan's business partner Helen Devaney; Colin Friels as Father Tom Dixon; Bille Brown as South Australian Premier Sir Thomas Playford; Ben Mendelsohn as newspaper publisher Rupert Murdoch; and John Gregg as Rohan Rivett. The film won an Australian Film Institute award in 2003 for David Ngoombujarra as Best Actor in a Supporting Role. The final scene of this film was the last scene from the 1993 docudrama Blood Brothers – Broken English, directed by Ned Lander. The makers of the movie were divided on whether Stuart had killed Mary Hattam.

The Supreme Court of South Australia provided assistance to the producers of the film with the Court's Historical Collection Library producing an exhibition on the case that coincided with the Adelaide screening of the film.

The film's producer, Helen Leake has reported that Stuart's response to seeing the film was, "It ain't half bad, but it's a long time to wait between smokes."
