= Andado =

Cattle station in the Northern Territory of Australia

Coordinates: 25.40897°S 135.29102°E

Location in the Northern Territory

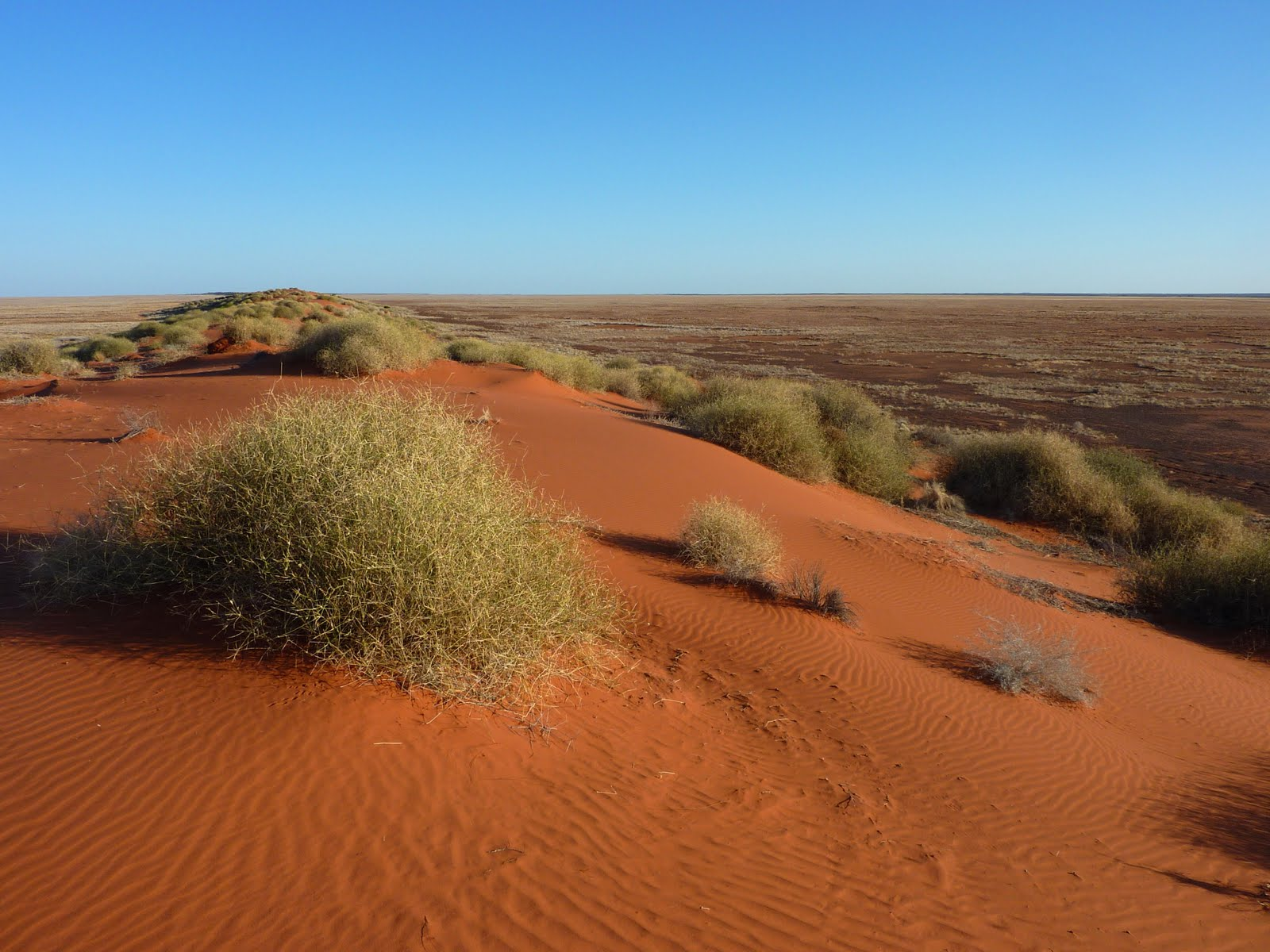
Dunes near Andado

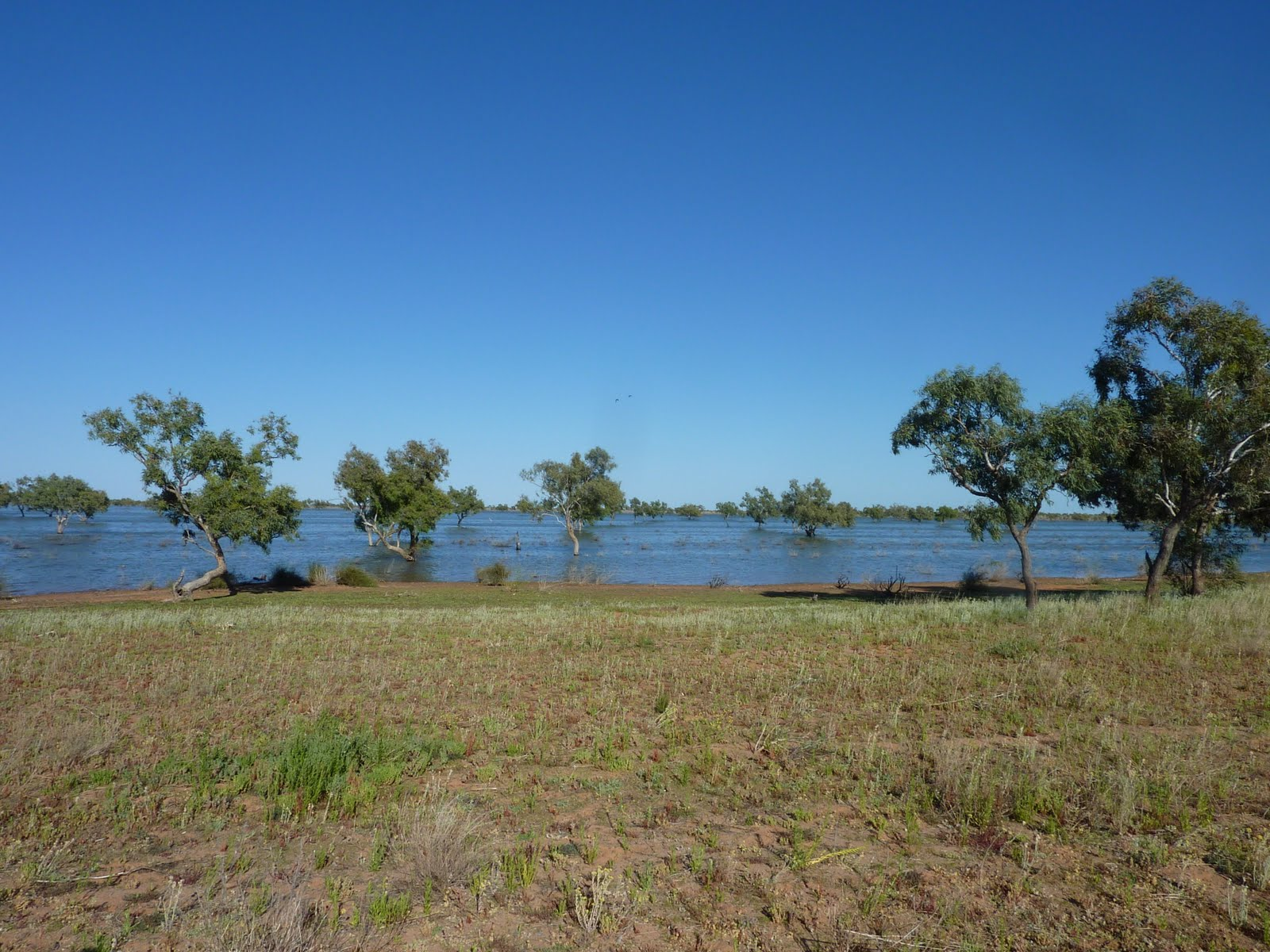
Andado swamp

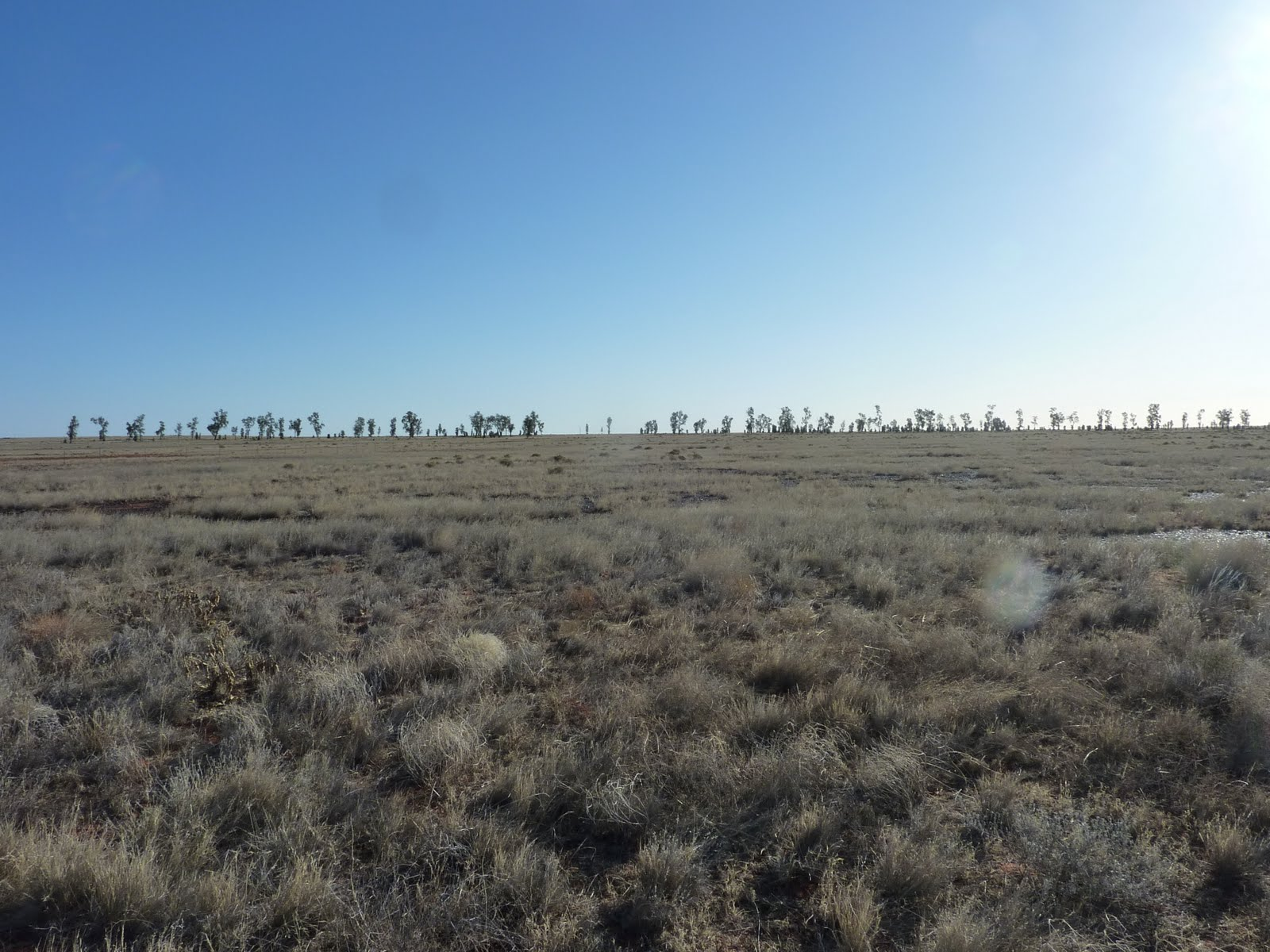
Andado Acacia peuce

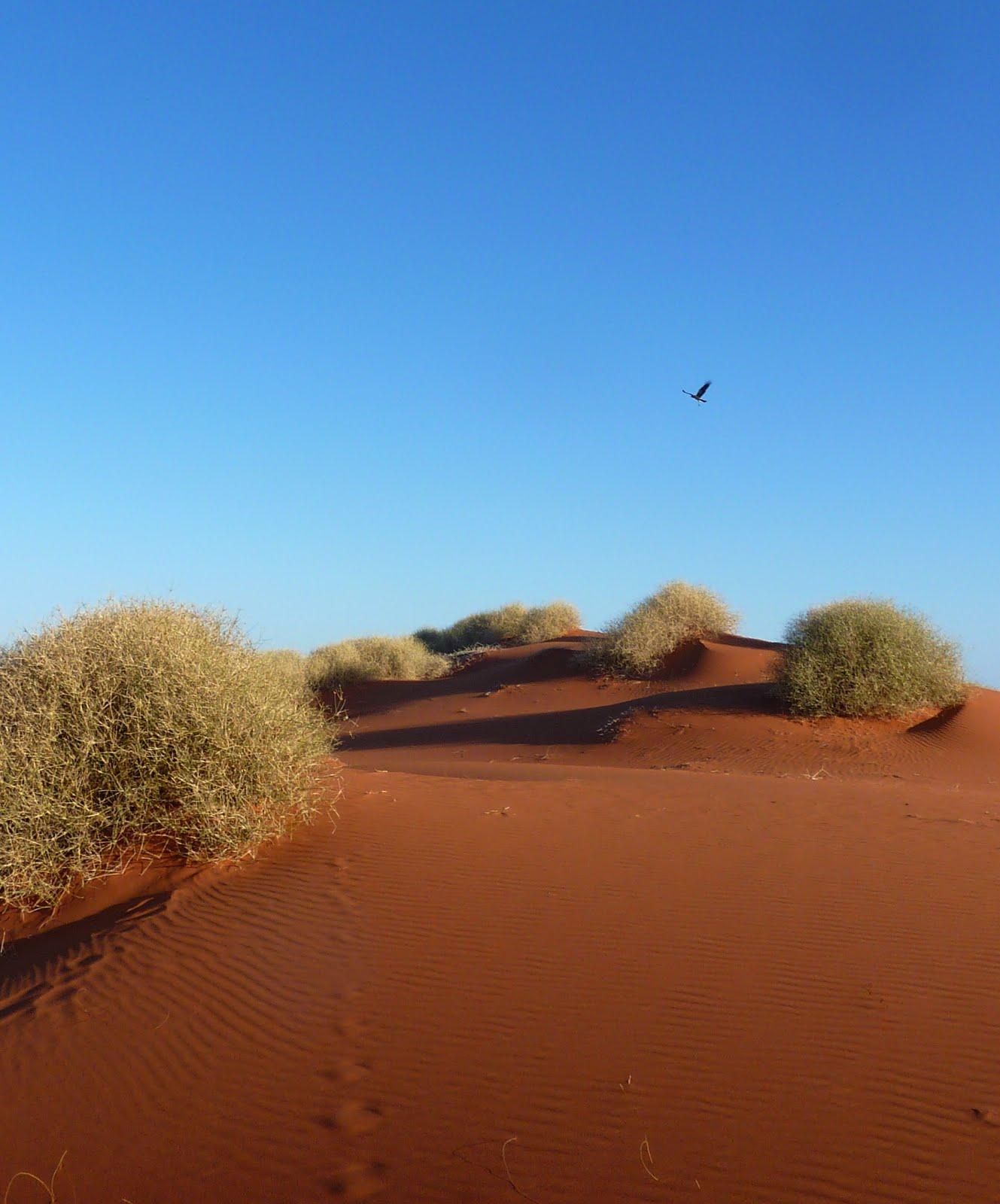
Bird flying over dune at Andado

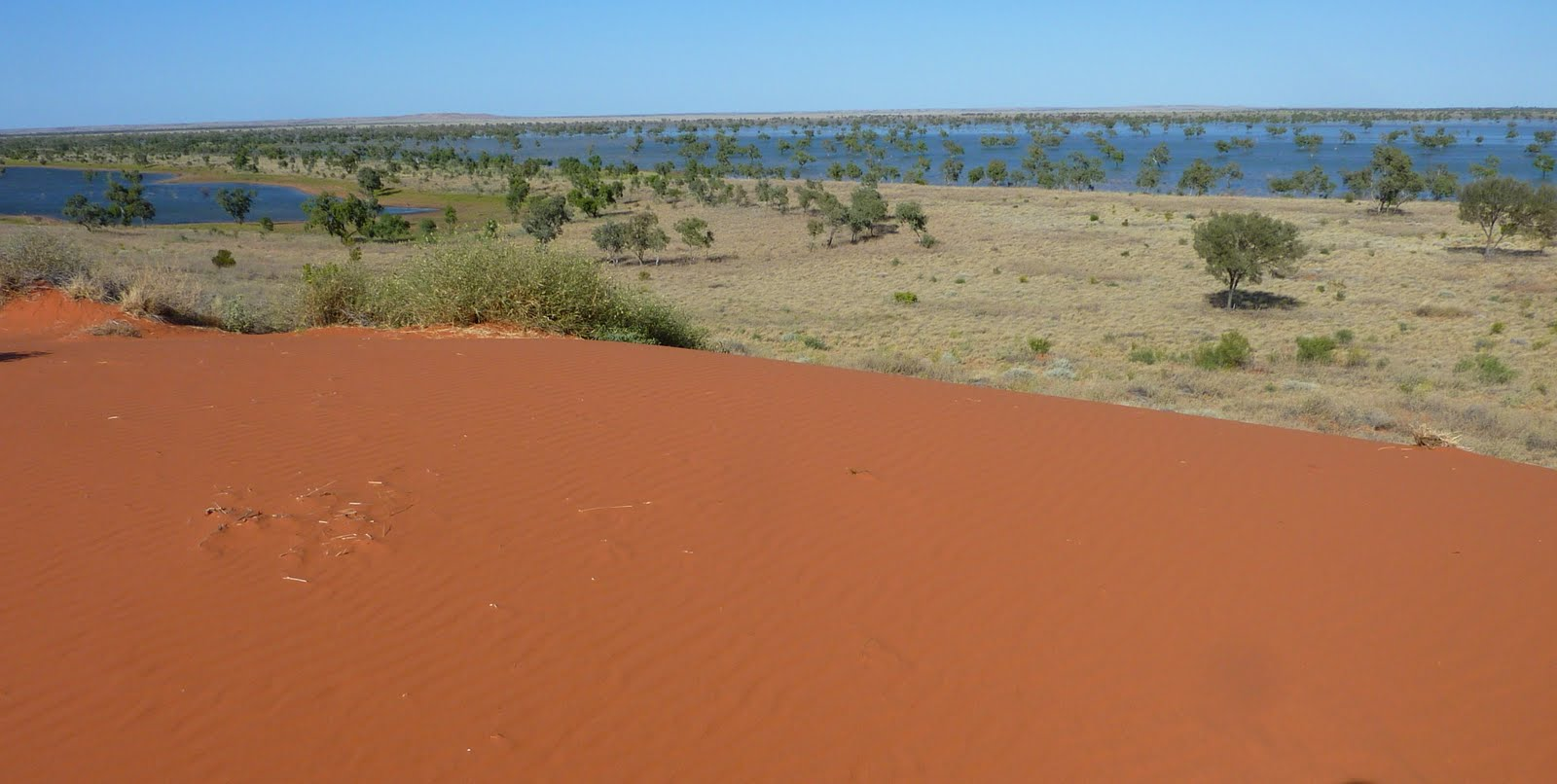
Swamp between dunes, 2013

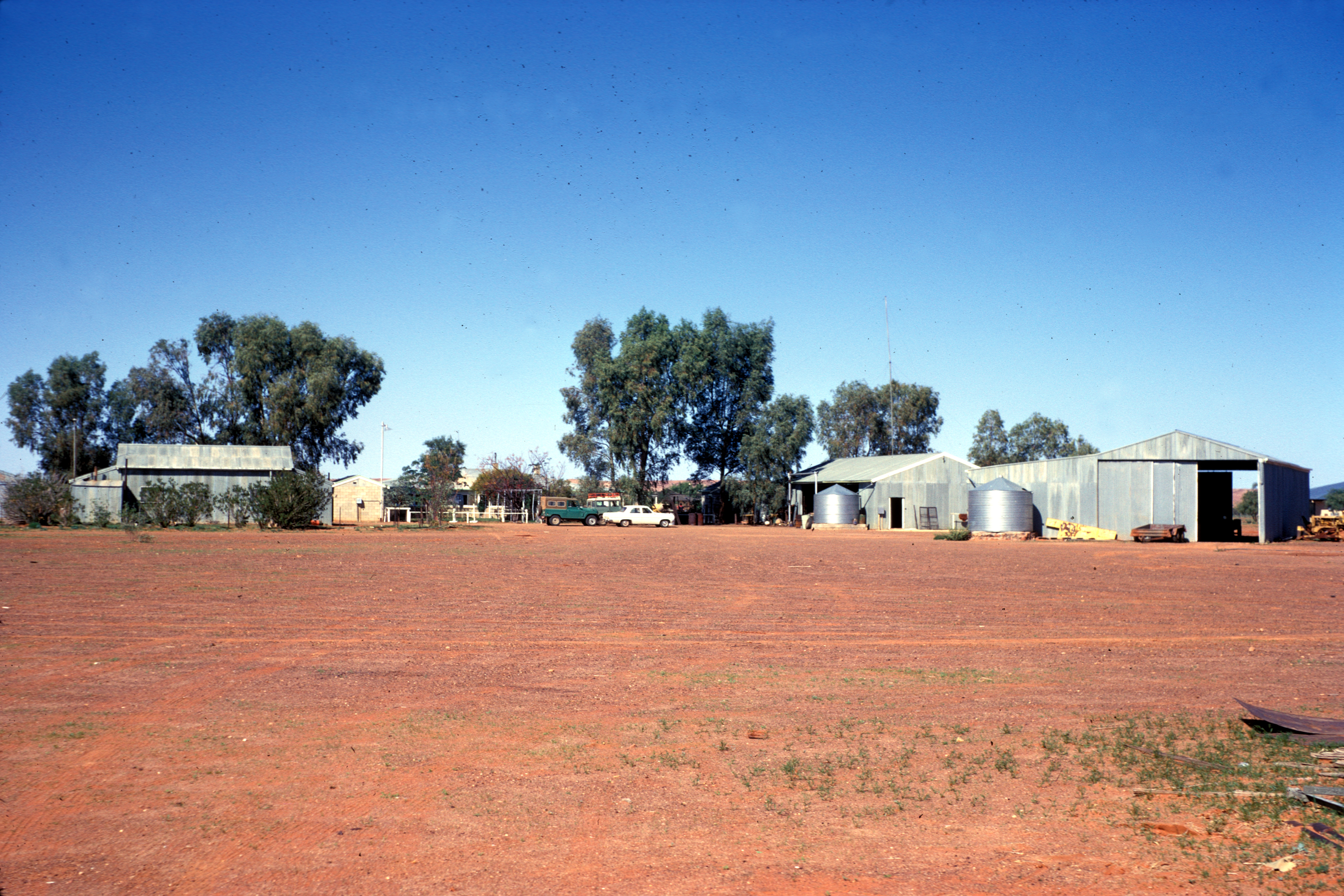
The Andado Station, c. 1973

Andado Station is a pastoral lease that operates as a cattle station in the Alice Springs region of the Northern Territory. On the traditional lands of the Arrernte people before European settlement, the first pastoral lease was granted in 1880. The station includes the Mac Clark Conservation Reserve, created to help preserve the rare Acacia peuce tree.

== Location ==
It is situated in the locality of Ghan about 170 kilometres (106 mi) south of Ltyentye Apurte Community and 240 kilometres (149 mi) south east of Alice Springs. The property shares a boundary with Crown Point Station to the west, Allambi to the north west, Pmere Nyenti Aboriginal Lands trust to the north and east, and the border with South Australia to the south. The homestead is the easternmost habitation on the western side of the Simpson Desert.

== Description ==
The station occupies an area of 10,850 square kilometres (4,189 sq mi) and is the largest privately held station in Australia. The property is situated on the western edge of the Simpson Desert and has a portion of the ephemeral Finke River flowing through it. It is composed of a mix of land systems, including desert sand plains and sand dunes, gibber plains, low hills and rises, flood-out country, swamps and lakes. The swamplands are found between tall dunes and only flood intermittently. Vegetation communities include large areas of spinifex grassland, saltbush shrublands, and acacia and eucalypt woodlands.

== History ==
The traditional owners of the area are the Arrente people, who lived and travelled through the area for thousands of years. The area is rich in Aboriginal artefacts and the name of the property is derived from a word meaning stone tool in Southern Arrente (a.k.a. Pertame), one of the Arrernte language dialects.

A portion of the area that is now part of the Andado leaseholding was held by Willoghby and Gordon in 1880. By 1909 the same area was occupied by Robert Sharpe and David Mayfield.

The Andado lease was first taken up by Robert MacDill in 1909. He sank several bores in the area and in 1914 gained more leases with his brother Robert David MacGill and Henry Stanley Roper. Shortly afterwards a mud brick dwelling was built. Another homestead was built in 1922 after Robert married and his wife came to live at the station. This homestead remains and is known as the Old Andado homestead. Sheep were introduced to the property at around the same time and several good seasons followed with plentiful rains. By the late 1920s drought struck the area and like many in the area the MacDill's struggled. By 1933 the property was running 1300 sheep, 420 cattle and 116 horses.

The MacDill family sold the property in 1942 and it changed hands several times until H. H. Overton acquired the property in 1955. Overton set up a partnership with experienced station manager Malcolm Clark, better known as Mac.

The Clark family arrived at Andado in 1955. Molly and Mac Clark and their three sons, Graham, Kevin and Philip, initially lived in the original homestead that was built in the 1920s but was prone to flooding. In 1960 they moved into a new homestead that was built 18 kilometres (11 mi) to the west of the old one on higher ground. By 1969 the Clark family owned Andado outright and by 1972 they commenced work on restoring the old abandoned homestead which was used to accommodate tourists.

In 1978 Mac suffered a heart attack and died a week later. Molly sold the property following a decision by the federal government in 1984 to eradicate brucellosis and tuberculosis on all cattle in the Northern Territory, which forced all of the stock on the property to be destroyed. In 1986 Molly sold the station except for the homestead and 45 square kilometres named Old Andado to be run as a stand-alone tourist destination.

The 3,082-hectare (7,620-acre) Mac Clark Conservation Reserve was established in 1982 within the station boundaries to preserve the rare Acacia peuce tree, of which there is a stand of 1,000 mature trees found about 40 kilometres (25 mi) north of the old homestead. During the 1900s most of these trees had been cut down to make shelters and stockyards until there were only three populations left: one at Andado, another near to Birdsville and the last near Boulia.

The area had been struck by drought from 2001 with minimal rains for the next eight years. In 2009 Don and Colleen Costello took over Andado after selling Mount Ebenezer Station. The Costellos also acquired New Crown and Lilla Creek Station, which together occupy an area of 22,000 square kilometres (8,494 sq mi). Don and Colleen live on New Crown with the managers, Wayne and Clarice Kimlin, in charge at Andado. Later the same year rains came and the Finke River flowed for the first time in over a decade. The property was stocked up with 3,000 head of cattle shortly afterwards.

By 2018, Andado Station was reported to be run by Viv Oldfield.

== See also ==
- List of ranches and stations
- List of the largest stations in Australia
