= Mac Clark (Acacia peuce) Conservation Reserve =

Protected area in the Northern Territory, Australia

- IUCN category IV (habitat/species management area)
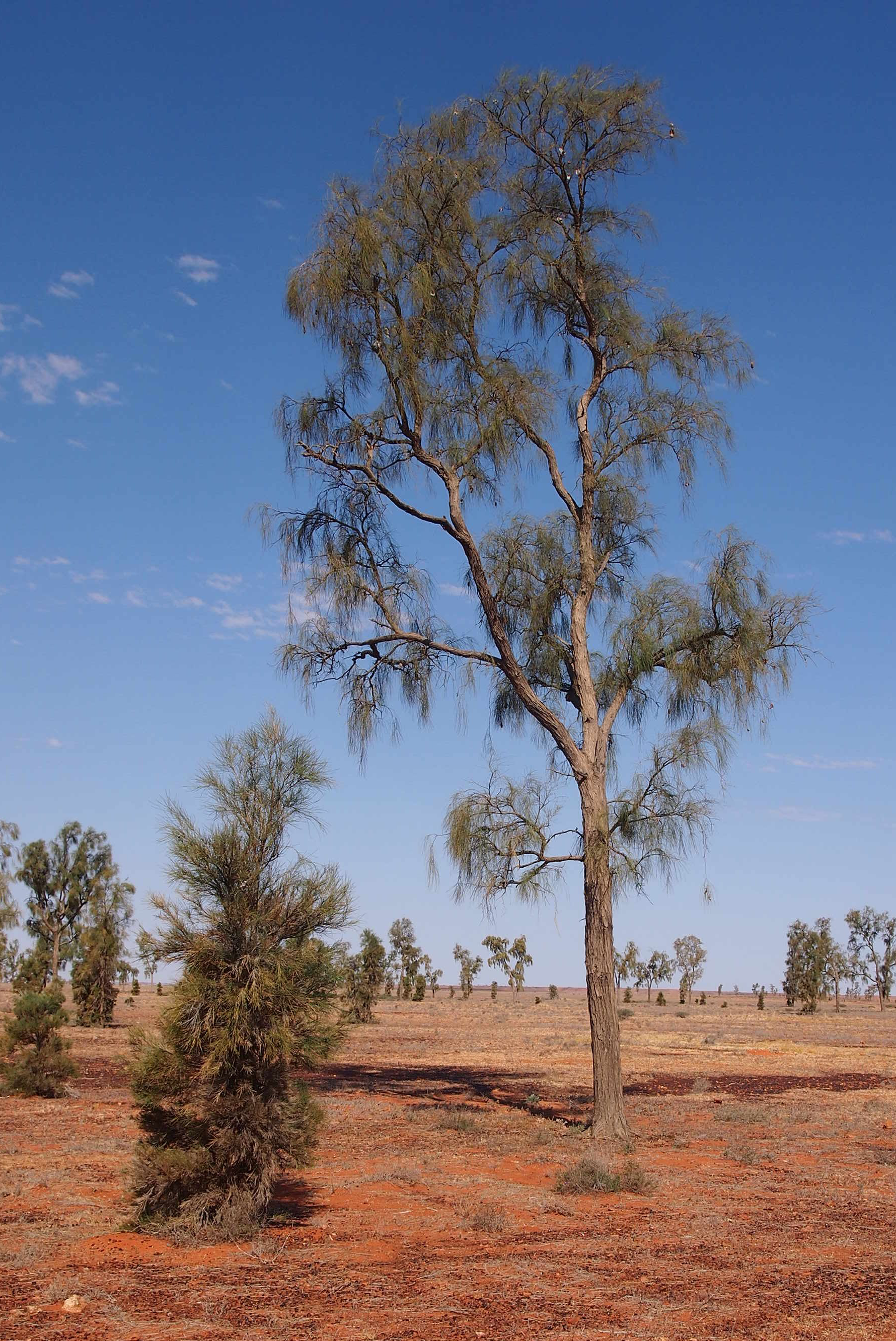
- Adult Acacia peuce tree

- Location within Northern Territory
- Location: Northern Territory, Ghan
- Coordinates: 25°07′18″S 135°30′29″E
- Area: 30.42 km^{2} (11.75 sq mi)
- Established: 1982
- Governing body: Parks and Wildlife Commission of the Northern Territory

Mac Clark (Acacia peuce) Conservation Reserve is a protected area in the Northern Territory of Australia located in the locality of Ghan.

It is located approximately 130 kilometres (81 mi) south of Ltyentye Apurte Community and 290 kilometres (180 mi) south east of Alice Springs. The reserve is surrounded by the pastoral lease and operating cattle station, Andado, the area also lies on the western edge of the Simpson Desert.

The area is fenced to protect it from stock. It can be accessed via the old Andado track or the Binns track via Ltyentye Apurte Community or from Kulgera via the Stuart Highway.

Occupying an area of 3,042 hectares (7,517 acres) the landscape in a flat, stony windswept plain in one of the hottest places in Australia. with temperatures often exceeding 40 °C (104 °F) in summer and an annual rainfall of about 150 millimetres (6 in).

The traditional owners of the area are the Arrente peoples, who lived and travelled through the area for thousands of years. The area is rich in Aboriginal artefacts and the name of the pastoral lease is derived from the Arrente word meaning stone tool.

Europeans arrived in the area in the 1880s and settled the lands for pastoralism, raising both sheep and more recently cattle. Malcolm "Mac" Clark and his wife Molly arrived at Andado Station in 1955, Mac died of a heart attack in 1978. The reserve bears his name as a result of his interest in conserving the trees found there.

The reserve was established to preserve the rare Acacia peuce tree, also known as waddywood, of which there is a stand of 1,000 mature trees found within the reserve. During the 1900s most of these trees had been cut down to make shelters and stockyards until there were only three populations left: one at Andado, another near to Birdsville and the last near Boulia. In an area where only a few shrubs and grasses are able to survive Acacia peuce thrives and is able to grow to a height of 17 metres (56 ft) and can live for up to 500 years. Prolonged drought, fire, rabbits and livestock are all a threat to any seedlings. Studies are being conducted in the area on regeneration rate and growth rate of the trees.

In 1991, the conservation reserve was listed on the now-defunct Register of the National Estate in 1991 and was added to the Northern Territory Heritage Register on 14 September 1994.

== See also ==
- Protected areas of the Northern Territory
