= Coda (1987 film) =

1987 Australian horror TV film

- Promotional poster
- Written by: Craig Lahiff; Terry Jennings
- Directed by: Craig Lahiff
- Starring: Penny Cook; Olivia Hamnett; Liddy Clark
- Music by: Frank Strangio
- Country of origin: Australia
- Original language: English

Production
- Producers: Tom Broadbridge; Terry Jennings
- Cinematography: Ellery Ryan
- Running time: 96 minutes
- Budget: A$600,000

Original release
- Release: 1987

Coda is a 1987 Australian made-for-TV horror mystery film directed by Craig Lahiff who described it as "very much a telefilm. I suppose it's very Hitchcocky - and de Palma inspired". It was the first of three films Lahiff had arranged finance for which were made in succession. The film focuses on a serial killer targeting female university students.

It was shot on location at Flinders University on 16mm and features women in all the lead roles.

== Plot ==
At a university, a music student is murdered and the main suspect is an ex of Kate Martin. She decides to investigate with the help of her friend Sally Reid.

== Cast ==
- Penny Cook as Kate Martin
- Arna-Maria Winchester as Dr. Steiner
- Liddy Clark as Sally Reid
- Patrick Frost as Mike Martin
- Vivienne Greaves as Anna
- Olivia Hamnett as Det. Sgt. Turner
- Adrian Shirley as a real estate agent
- Bob Newman as a psychiatrist

== Production ==
Lahiff made the film after graduating with a Masters in film. He later said, "It took a while to work out the mechanisms of how to finance it, but that was the first full-length film". Filming started 23 August 1986.

== Reception ==
According to "Variety," "This kind of film can only enthrall an audience if it's convincing, and credulity is stretched beyond breaking point time and again... Thesping is not at all bad, with both Penny Cook and Liddy Clark providing pleasing characters as the frightened ladies. The protracted climax, consisting of endless chases down college corridors and then yet another fall from a high window (again, miraculously non-fatal) is merely dullsville".

According to Lahiff's collaborator, Josephine Emery, the film "opened doors for" Lahiff, "As a result of its success at American Film Market Craig was approached by J. C. Williamson's with an offer of money to finance a 90-minute thriller". This led to Lahiff's next film, Fever.
