= The Dreaming (film) =

- Promotional poster
- Directed by: Mario Andreacchio
- Written by: Mario Andreacchio; Rob George; Stephanie McCarthy
- Story by: Terry Jennings; Craig Lahiff
- Produced by: Craig Lahiff; Wayne Groom
- Starring: Arthur Dignam; Penny Cook
- Cinematography: Ellery Ryan
- Edited by: Suresh Ayyar
- Music by: Frank Strangio
- Production companies: FGH; International Film Management; Genesis Films
- Distributed by: Filmpac Holdings
- Release date: 29 December 1988
- Running time: 88 minutes
- Country: Australia
- Language: English
- Budget: A$2.2 million

The Dreaming is a 1988 Australian horror film directed by Mario Andreacchio and starring Arthur Dignam, Penny Cook, and Gary Sweet.

== Plot ==
After an aboriginal tomb is opened by archaeologist Bernard Thornton on an island off the south coast of Australia, his daughter, Dr. Cathy Thornton, treats a young aboriginal girl, Warindji, in a hospital emergency room for an unspecified injury. Despite efforts to resuscitate her, the girl experiences ventricular tachycardia and dies. The incident leaves Cathy rattled. That night, she experiences a vision of the girl standing outside her bedroom window, followed by several brute whaling fisherman appearing inside her home.

The following morning, Cathy is notified at work from her father that her mother has died. After attending her funeral, Cathy departs to visit her father, who has returned to the island. Cathy informs her boyfriend Geoff that she is returning to work, but instead travels to the coast. While driving through the forest, she is again accosted by an apparition of the band of whalers, who surround her car. She spends the night at an inn in the local fishing village, and experiences a nightmarish dream in which she witnesses the whalers abusing a young aboriginal woman.

Cathy takes a boat to the island at daybreak, and reunites with her father. While Bernard continues his archeological dig in the cave, he locates several artifacts left behind by the whalers, such as fishing spears. Meanwhile, Geoff tracks Cathy to the island. That night, Cathy has another nightmare in which Geoff is attacked by the whalers' schooner, crashing and sinking his boat before spearing him to death. She is awoken from the nightmare by Geoff, who has arrived at the island late in the night.

Geoff uncovers a journal amongst Bernard's collected artifacts, detailing the whalers' brutalization and massacring of an aboriginal tribe upon arriving on the island in 1856. Outside, Bernard starts a fire, which Geoff goes to investigate. Shortly after, Cathy is attacked by Bernard, now possessed by the spirits of the whalers, whose murders created a rift in the aborigine's spirit realm. Cathy flees outside, where she finds Geoff's speared and hanged corpse, before hiding in a lighthouse. Bernard, still possessed, chases her to the top of the lighthouse, from which she pushes him to his death.

== Cast ==
- Arthur Dignam as Professor Bernard Thornton
- Penny Cook as Cathy Thornton
- Gary Sweet as Geoff Douglas
- Laurence Clifford as Najira
- Kristina Nehm as Warindji
- Patrick Frost as Dr. Graham
- John Noble as Dr. Richards
- Peter Merrill as Archaeologist (as Peter Merril)
- Deborah Little as Admissions Officer
- Leo Taylor as Alf
- Marcella Russo as young Nurse
- Kathy Fisher as Sister
- Gary Goodwin as Policeman
- Kym Hyde as Whaler
- Michael Evans as Whaler
- Brenton Whittle as Barrister

== Production ==
The movie was originally meant to be directed by Craig Lahiff but he dropped out before filming, and was replaced by Mario Andreacchio.

The film was made on Kangaroo Island and features shots of many of the island's local landmarks, such as Seal Bay and Admiral's Arch. Kangaroo Island has a genuine history of being visited by rough whaling men who had often kidnapped aboriginal women from Tasmania, The Coorong and other places on Australia's southernmost coastline.

There is an H. P. Lovecraft related in-joke in the film. As Penny Cook's character drives to Kangaroo Island towards the end of the movie in search of her father, her car passes a roadsign which reads "Innsmouth 2 km".

Funds were raised through Antony I. Ginnane's FGH company and the South Australian Film Corporation. The film was pre-sold to US distributor Goldfarb for $1.32 million but Goldfarb encountered financial difficulties and IFM sought other distributors.

The director later said that: "[It] was originally a script that was tackling, quite strongly, the issue of the past treatment of aborigines, the white-black conflict. Unfortunately, there was a time when the script was changed right in front of me and I was subject to other people saying, "No, you can't make that film, you've got to make this film". So, when you're in that position where you're starting out and where nobody trusts you, nobody really has total faith in your vision because you haven't actually got a track record. Then they take the prominent position."

== Release ==
The film was released direct-to-video in Australia on 29 December 1988 through Filmpac.
