= Penny Cook =

Australian actress (1957–2018)

- Cook on A Country Practice in 1984
- Born: Penelope Cook; 13 July 1957; Melbourne, Victoria, Australia
- Died: 26 December 2018 (aged 61); Sydney, New South Wales, Australia
- Occupations: Actress; television presenter; stage director; writer
- Years active: 1977−2018
- Known for: A Country Practice (1981–1985); E Street (1989–1991); The Great Outdoors (1992–1996); Neighbours (2007–08, 2010); All Saints (2007–2008); Pulse (2017)
- Spouse(s): Clive Robertson (divorced); David Lynch
- Children: 1
- Website: pennycook.com.au

Penelope Cook (13 July 1957 – 26 December 2018) was an Australian actress, TV presenter and writer. In theatre she worked in various capacities including as a stage director, narrator, voice over, publicist and technician.

She played roles in the soap opera A Country Practice, as original character of vet Vicki Dean Bowen from 1981 to 1985, E Street as lead anchor-character, Dr. Elly Fielding, another original cast member before she was replaced in that role by Diane Craig.

Between 1989 and 1991, she appeared in Neighbours in the recurring role of Prue Brown from 2007 to 2010. She was also a presenter on travel show The Great Outdoors

== Early life ==
Cook was born in Melbourne and grew up in Woollahra in Sydney's Eastern Suburbs. Her mother was a physiotherapist and her father served in the Royal Australian Navy based at Garden Island Naval Precinct. After completing high school, Cook auditioned for the National Institute of Dramatic Art (NIDA) but failed to gain a place. Instead, her mother helped her obtain a radiography traineeship at the Royal Prince Alfred Hospital. A year later, Cook auditioned for NIDA again and was successful. Whilst attending drama school, she made her debut in theatre in 1977. She graduated the NIDA the following year in 1978.

== Career ==
=== Television ===
Cook made her debut on television in 1979 as Susie Denning in soap opera, The Restless Years. Her most well-known role was as veterinarian Vicky Dean Bowen in the drama series, A Country Practice, and was one of the longest serving early actors in that series appearing from its inception in November 1981 until 1985, and 330 episodes, a role for which she won Logie Awards in 1984 and 1985. Her relationship and wedding in A Country Practice to Dr Simon Bowen, played by Grant Dodwell, became one of the highest rated and most popular storylines of that series. After a break from television for over two years, Cook returned in 1989 to play Dr Elly Fielding in a new Ten Network soap opera, E Street. This role had been especially created for her, and Cook remained in the series from 1989 to early 1991. She went on to a guest role in ABC's medical drama G.P..

From 1992 to 1996 Cook was a presenter on the Australian travel show The Great Outdoors. She appeared in the police drama Young Lions in 2002. From June 2007 until late 2010, she joined the cast of Australian soap opera Neighbours in the recurring role of Prue Brown, mother of Frazer Yeats (Ben Lawson) and Ringo Brown (Sam Clark). Cook also guest starred in episodes of All Saints in 2007 and 2008. In 2017, she played a supporting role in the ABC hospital drama Pulse.

=== Theatre ===
Cook had a long involvement in the theatre, both as an actress and director. She was involved in nearly 40 stage productions, including at the Ensemble Theatre and the Sydney Theatre Company, and helped establish the Griffin Theatre Company in 1979. Her most notable stage appearances included the John Bell–Richard Tognetti production of The Soldier's Tale with the Australian Chamber Orchestra and the Australian tour of Oscar Wilde's An Ideal Husband, directed in Sydney by English director Sir Peter Hall.

She served on the board of Sydney's Monkey Baa Theatre and worked extensively with the Australian Theatre for Young People.

== Personal life and death ==
Cook was married twice; first to radio broadcaster and television personality Clive Robertson and subsequently to businessman David Lynch. In 1998 they had a daughter, Poppy.

Cook died from cancer on 26 December 2018, aged 61.

== Filmography ==
=== Film ===
Year	Title	Role	Type
1987	Lay Off	Narrator	Film documentary
1988	The Dreaming	Cathy Thornton	Feature film
1993	Joh's Jury	Penny	TV movie
1995	Midnight Expresso		Film short
2003	The Waltz	May	Film short
2018	The Merger	Fran Barlow	Feature film

=== Television ===
Year	Title	Role	Type
1979	Patrol Boat		TV series, 1 episode
1979	The Restless Years	Susie Denning	TV series, 4 episodes
1979	Skyways	Joanna Whicker	TV series, 1 episode
1980	Spring & Fall	Refuge Worker	TV series, 1 episode
1980	The Young Doctors		TV series
1981	Bellamy		TV series, 1 episode
1981	Menotti		TV series, 1 episode
1981-85; 1993	A Country Practice	Vicky Dean / Vicky Bowen / Victoria 'Vicky' Dean	TV series, 330 episodes
1982-1986	Channel 7 Perth Telethon	Herself	TV special
1985	Star Search	Guest Judge	TV series, 1 episode
1986	It's a Knockout	Guest Referee	TV series, 1 episode
1986	Password	Herself	TV series
1987	Coda	Kate Martin	TV movie
1987	Have a Go	Guest Judge	TV series, 4 episodes
1987	The Flying Doctors	Susan Fowler	TV series, 1 episode
1988	Swap Shop	Herself	TV series
1988	Life Education Television Appeal	Herself	TV special
1989-1991	E Street	Dr. Elly Fielding	TV series, 210 episodes
1989	Naked Under Capricorn	Peggy Delaney	TV miniseries, 2 episodes
1990	Hands Up for a Story	Herself	Training film
1990	TV Celebrity Dance Party	Herself (singing "Another Done Somebody Wrong Song")	TV special
1991	Celebrity Wheel of Fortune	Herself - Contestant with Bob Shearer, Paul Jennings & John Howard	TV series, 1 episode
1991	G.P.	Beth Paige	TV series, 8 episodes
1991	Burke's Backyard	Celebrity Gardener	TV series, 1 episode
1991	In Sydney Today	Guest	TV series, 1 episode
1991; 1993	Tonight Live with Steve Vizard	Guest	TV series, 1 episode
1991	The Main Event	Herself	TV series, 1 episode
1991	'Til Ten	Guest	TV series, 1 episode
1992	The Morning Show	Regular Presenter	TV series
1992	What's Cooking?	Guest	TV series, 1 episode
1993	A Country Practice: The Final Night	Dr. Vicky Bowen	TV series, 1 episode
1993-1996	The Great Outdoors	Presenter	TV series
1993	Tonight Live	Guest host	TV series, 1 episode
1994	Midday with Derryn Hinch	Herself	TV series, 1 episode
1994; 1995	Denton	Guest	TV series, 2 episodes
1994-2000; 2005	Good Morning Australia	Guest	TV series, 8 episodes
1995	Funniest People	Guest	TV series, 3 episodes
1996	Ally and Doc	Ally	TV pilot
1996	Passion	Presenter	TV series
1997	Good News Week	Guest	TV series, 2 episodes
1997	Midday with Kerri-Anne	Guest	TV series, 2 episodes
1997	Today	Guest	TV series, 1 episode
1997	Cliptomaniacs	Herself	TV series
1998	FCTV	Host	TV series
1998	The Ten Out-Take Files	Host	TV series, 7 episodes
2002	Young Lions	Chief Inspector Sharon Kostas	TV series, 22 episodes
2003	Page to Screen	Herself - Performance Director	TV documentary
2003	This Is Your Life: The Australian Women's Weekly 70th Birthday Party	Guest - Herself	TV series, 1 episode
2005	Good Morning Australia	Guest - Herself	TV series, 1 episode
2006	The Book Club	Book Reviewer	TV series, 1 episode
2006	Where Are They Now?	Herself	TV series, 1 episode
2007-2008	All Saints	Rhonda Goldman	TV series, 5 episodes
2007	Neighbours	Prue Brown	TV series, 28 episodes
2010	Dance Academy	Caroline	TV series, 1 episode
2011	Laid	Nun	TV series, 1 episode
2014	Rake	Alice Kendall	TV series, 1 episode
2015	Heidi	Grandmamma	TV series, 2 episodes
2016	The Daily Edition	Herself	TV series, 1 episode
2016	The Morning Show	Guest (with Benita Collings & Lex Marinos)	TV series, 1 episode
2017	Pulse	Carol Little	TV series, 8 episodes
