= Helen Leake =

Australian film producer (born 1949)

Helen Leake AM
- Born: Helen Louise Mann; 15 December 1949 (age 76); Adelaide, South Australia
- Education: Seymour College
- Alma mater: Flinders University
- Occupation: Film producer
- Years active: 1992–present
- Spouse: John Espie Leake (m. 1976)

Helen Louise Leake AM (born 15 December 1949) is an Australian film producer, who was CEO of the South Australian Film Corporation from 2004 to 2007.

She was born Helen Louise Mann in Adelaide, South Australia, and was educated at Seymour College and Flinders University.

In 1994, she founded Duo Art Productions with Craig Lahiff, and they produced the films Ebbtide (1994), Heaven's Burning (1997), Black and White (2002) and Swerve (2011) with Lahiff directing. In 2013, Leake produced Wolf Creek 2, a sequel to Greg McLean's 2005 horror thriller.

From 2004 to 2007, Leake was CEO of the South Australian Film Corporation, having beenon the corporation's board since 2001.

In 2014, Leake founded Dancing Road Productions with Gena Ashwell. The company's latest film Carnifex (2022) is an eco-thriller set in the Australian bush as Australia recovers from unprecedented bushfires. The company is now producing an upcoming biographical film about Sir John Monash.

At the 2020 Australia Day Honours, Leake was made a Member of the Order of Australia for service to film, and to professional organisations.

Helen was appointed as a Director on the Screen Australia Board in June 2021.
