= Thomas Sidney Dixon =

Australian missionary (1916–1993)

Thomas Sidney Dixon (1916 – 1993) was a Catholic missionary known for his work with Indigenous peoples. He took up the cause of Max Stuart, an Arrernte Aboriginal convicted of murder in 1959.

== Early life ==
Thomas Dixon was born in Sydney, the 15th of 18 children born to Irish-English parents, who had immigrated from Liverpool in England two years earlier.

Dixon had been schooled by nuns before he entered Christian Brothers College. At the age of 12, he entered a seminary of the Missionaries of the Sacred Heart (M.S.C.), where he eventually took his vows. In November 1941, he was appointed to run a mission in Rabaul in East New Britain, Papua New Guinea. However, while he was en route Pearl Harbor was attacked, and he was instead asked to travel to Palm Island, 65 km (40 mi) north-west of Townsville, on the east coast of Queensland, to relieve an ill priest for three months. Dixon remained and taught on the island for seven years.

In 1949, Dixon transferred to Toowoomba, Queensland where he taught English, French and algebra at a Catholic school. At the end of the year, he was appointed to the Thursday Island mission that also served Hammond Island. There, he taught the local population, which was a mix of Australian Aboriginals, Papuans, Samoans, Filipinos, Malays and Sinhalese. On Hammond Island, Dixon designed and built a mortarless stone church with stained glass windows made from beer bottles.

== Santa Teresa ==
In 1954 Dixon was reassigned to a mission that M.S.C. had founded near Alice Springs, Santa Teresa (now Ltyentye Apurte Community), to serve the Arrernte Aboriginals. Nuns ran the mission school and clinic while lay brothers worked as handymen. Dixon was responsible for the Church and learnt to speak Arrernte so that he could preach to them in their own language. He introduced not only Mass to local Aboriginals but also the cabbage to their diet. The indigenous women and children were largely permanent residents at the mission, and most of the men moved around following seasonal work. Almost all the children and many of the women were baptised as Catholics, but the men tended to be baptised Lutherans as they were more accustomed to attending the Hermannsburg Lutheran mission, 160 km (99 mi) east of Santa Teresa.

As many of the Aboriginals lived in huts made from corrugated iron, Dixon organised the local men to build houses to replace them. Local stone was chipped by hand with the locals given rations while they worked on their own home with an additional cash allowance when they worked on someone else's. Within two years, every family lived in a stone house.

In 1956, Dixon moved to Adelaide, where he was appointed as curate for the Hindmarsh Parish that M.S.C. had begun after it had received permission from the Catholic Archdiocese of Adelaide.

== Max Stuart ==
In 1959, Rupert Max Stuart was on death row awaiting execution for the murder of Mary Hattam. Stuart had already visited with a Salvation Army officer and a Lutheran pastor when Father John O’Loughlin, the Adelaide Goal's junior Catholic chaplain, met him. Stuart was not very communicative because of his limited English, which O’Loughlin mentioned to his friend, Father Tom Dixon, who lived in a presbytery in nearby Hindmarsh. As he could speak Stuart's native language, Dixon decided to visit Stuart and to help prepare him for death.

Stuart insisted he had not killed the girl, and Dixon initially suspected he was looking for sympathy. By 14 May, the execution was eight days away, and Dixon had become convinced that Stuart was telling the truth. He contacted J. D. O'Sullivan, Stuart's solicitor, who gave him a copy of Stuart's confession. After reading it, he concluded that Stuart could not have dictated it.

Dixon had read a book on Arrernte grammar written by T.G.H. Strehlow and asked him to check Stuart's language for comparison with the confession. Strehlow had been born at a mission at which his father was a pastor, and it turned out that he had grown up with Stuart and knew his parents well. Strehlow visited Stuart on 18 May, and for the first time, Stuart was able to give his alibi in his native tongue, which Strehlow then translated to English. On the matter of the police confession, Strehlow wrote:

"In my ten years of varied experience of evidence given by Aboriginals, part Aboriginals, police officers and white residents of the Northern Territory, I had never seen a document even faintly resembling the one I was now looking at. Far from bearing any resemblance to any statement ever made by an Aboriginal or part Aboriginal person....(the document) could have been composed only by some person who was well versed in legal procedure and in the practice of giving court evidence."

On 20 May, Stuart applied for leave to appeal to the High Court based on Strehlow's findings. Justice Reed granted a stay of execution and set a new date of 19 June. On 18 June, a further extension to 7 July was granted to allow time for a decision, which was handed down on 19 June. Leave to appeal was denied.

=== Stuart Campaign ===
On 22 June Dixon contacted Dr. Charles Duguid, who ran the Aborigines' Advancement League, to discuss Stuart's situation. On 27 June, a meeting of the League, university teachers, clergymen and representatives of the Howard League for Penal Reform was held in Duguid's Magill home at which Dixon and Strehlow gave a talk. It was decided to mount a campaign to keep Stuart alive, and the distribution of petitions for commutation was arranged.
