= Swerve (film) =

2011 film by Craig Lahiff

- Directed by: Craig Lahiff
- Written by: Craig Lahiff
- Produced by: Helen Leake
- Starring: Emma Booth; Jason Clarke; David Lyons; Travis MacMahon; Roy Billing; Chris Haywood; Vince Colosimo
- Cinematography: David Foreman
- Edited by: Sean Lahiff
- Music by: Paul Grabowsky
- Production companies: Screen Australia; South Australian Film Corporation
- Release dates: 25 July 2011 (MIFF); 7 June 2012 (Australia)
- Running time: 87 minutes
- Country: Australia
- Language: English
- Box office: $3,338

Swerve is a 2011 Australian thriller film written and directed by Craig Lahiff and starring Emma Booth, Jason Clarke and David Lyons. Lyons plays an honest man who, after coming upon a car accident, retrieves a suitcase full of cash from a wrecked car.

== Plot ==
In rural Australia, two men meet for a drug deal and exchange suitcases wordlessly. When the buyer checks the drugs, he discovers that he has been cheated, but an explosive hidden in the suitcase kills him before he can retaliate. The seller puts a suitcase full of cash in his car and speeds down the highway to Neverest to meet a contact. As he recklessly attempts to overtake another car, he swerves off the road to avoid a collision and dies. A man involved in the crash, Colin, discovers the suitcase and gives the female driver of the oncoming car a ride back to Neverest. There, he meets Frank, a local cop, and Colin discovers that the other driver is actually Frank's wife, Jina. Colin hands the money over to Frank, who invites Colin to stay overnight while Colin waits for his car to be repaired. When Frank leaves to secure the cash, Jina unsuccessfully attempts to seduce Colin. When Colin notices a bruise on Jina, she claims that Frank beats her, but Colin becomes suspicious when he hears Frank and Jina have rough sex, which she seems to enjoy.

While a mechanic works at the site of the wreck, a gangster named Charlie arrives, looking for the money. When the mechanic becomes too inquisitive, Charlie kills him and heads into town. Frank drops off Colin at the garage, where Jina works. Her boss, Sam, insinuates that she has had extramarital affairs with another police officer, Chris Welles, who disappeared under mysterious circumstances. Jina angrily leaves after Sam demands that she clean the garage, and Colin fixes his car himself when the mechanic does not show up. Finding the suitcase empty in the police station, Charlie murders a patrolman who wanders in and heads for Frank's house. Jina sees Colin and requests a ride back to her house. Although pressed for time to make a job interview in a nearby town, Colin agrees. At the house, Charlie surprises and knocks out Frank, who is preparing to leave town. After he ransacks the house, Charlie leaves with a picture of Jina.

When Frank awakes, he assumes that Jina and Colin have attempted to kill him, and he attacks them. Jina appears to accidentally kill Frank and suggests to Colin that they dump Frank's body. Colin cynically suggests that she already had a plan prepared. Jina convinces Colin that nobody will believe Frank's death was self-defense, and they dump his body in a mine shaft. When Colin realizes that he dropped his dog tags at the mine, they return to retrieve them, and Colin falls in the shaft. In the mine, he discovers the body of missing policeman Chris Welles and realizes that Frank has escaped the mine. Frank returns to town, tortures Sam for information about his wife's whereabouts, and races to catch up to Colin and Jina, who have already boarded a train. As Colin accuses Jina of possibly murdering Welles, Charlie recovers the money from their cabin, and Frank jumps onto the train from an overpass. Before Charlie can leave the cabin, Frank finds and kills him.

When Colin and Jina return, Frank admits to killing Welles and demands that they jump from the moving train. Colin knocks the gun from Frank's hand, and Jina shoots Frank, who falls out of the train. Later, Jina suggests that she and Colin keep the money for themselves, and the two kiss. Colin wakes from a nap and finds both Jina and the money gone. With nowhere else to go, Colin returns to the bar in Neverest, where he uses a $100 note to buy a beer. Recognizing the currency, the publican tells Colin an old middle eastern story about a woman who attempts to cheat death by fleeing to a different city, only to find death waiting there for her. After this, the publican demands to know where the rest of his money is, revealing himself to be the seller's contact in Neverest. However, before Colin can answer, the two see that the note has become wet and the ink has begun to run; it is counterfeit. Colin wanders out of the bar, and walks off into the night.

== Cast ==
- Emma Booth as Jina
- Jason Clarke as Frank
- David Lyons as Colin
- Travis McMahon as Charlie
- Vince Colosimo as Sam
- Robert Mammone as Logan
- Chris Haywood as Armstrong
- Roy Billing as Good Samaritan
- Greg Stone as Publican

== Production ==
The film was shot in 2010 over a seven-week period. Jason Clarke and David Lyons were Australian actors who had earned reputations in the US and returned home to make the film. It was completed in 2011 and premiered in Australia at the Melbourne International Film Festival.

== Reception ==
Rotten Tomatoes, a review aggregator, reports that 36% of 28 surveyed critics gave the film a positive review; the average rating is 5.2/10. The sites consensus reads: "It aims for pulpy noir thrills, but Swerve never lives up to the twisty promise of its title." Metacritic rated it 42/100 based on eleven reviews. Ed Gibbs of The Sydney Morning Herald rated it 3.5/5 stars and called it a "lively, noir-flavoured thriller". Michael Bodey of The Australian described it as "a taut, pulpy thriller that serves as a fine showcase for a surprisingly long list of well-known Australian actors". Richard Kuipers of Variety wrote, "Staple pulp crime ingredients – a girl, a gun, a stranger, a crooked cop and a suitcase full of hot cash – are neatly moved around a dusty outback town in the juicy Aussie thriller Swerve." Megan Lehmann of The Hollywood Reporter wrote that the film, though occasionally implausible, "ticks all the essential pot-boiler boxes and earns a distinction by virtue of its unconventional setting." Sheri Linden of the Los Angeles Times wrote that it "has elements of a great thriller, except for a good plot". Manohla Dargis of The New York Times wrote that it "throws a handful of familiar genre bits at the screen", but the film fails to live up to its promise.
