= Black and White (2002 film) =

Black And White
- Directed by: Craig Lahiff
- Written by: Louis Nowra
- Produced by: Helen Leake; Nik Powell
- Starring: Robert Carlyle; Charles Dance; Kerry Fox; David Ngoombujarra; Colin Friels
- Edited by: Lee Smith
- Music by: Cezary Skubiszewski
- Distributed by: New Vision Films
- Release date: 31 October 2002 (Australia)
- Running time: 99 minutes
- Country: Australia
- Language: English
- Box office: A$177,866 (Australia)

Black and White is a 2002 Australian film directed by Craig Lahiff and starring Robert Carlyle, Charles Dance, Kerry Fox, David Ngoombujarra, and Colin Friels. Louis Nowra wrote the screenplay, and Helen Leake and Nik Powell produced the film. For his performance in the film, Ngoombujarra won an Australian Film Institute award in 2003 as Best Actor in a Supporting Role.

== Plot ==
Based on real events, Black and White tells the story of Max Stuart (Ngoombujarra), a young Aboriginal man who was sentenced to death after being found guilty of the murder of a nine-year-old girl on what was considered questionable evidence. It follows the fight by his lawyers David O'Sullivan (Carlyle) and Helen Devaney (Fox) to save Stuart from execution, as well as Crown Prosecutor, Roderic Chamberlain's (Dance) efforts to convict Stuart. Rohan Rivett editor of an Adelaide paper, The News, and its publisher, Rupert Murdoch (Ben Mendelsohn) also feature as leading the public response in the campaign to save Stuart.

In the final scene of the film, Max Stuart appeared as himself as an older man, driving along a dirt highway near Alice Springs where he lived at the time, and saying: "Yeah, some people think I'm guilty and some people think I'm not. Some people think Elvis is still alive, but most of us think he's dead and gone."

== Cast ==
- Robert Carlyle as David O'Sullivan
- Charles Dance as Crown Prosecutor, Roderic Chamberlain
- Kerry Fox as Helen Devaney
- David Ngoombujarra as Max Stuart
- Colin Friels as Father Tom Dixon
- Ben Mendelsohn as Rupert Murdoch
- Marshall Napier as Prison Warden
- Frank Gallacher as Justice Reed
- Peter Whitford as Justice Windeyer
- Roy Billing as Detective Sergeant Turner
- Penne Hackforth-Jones as Mrs Aston
- Heather Mitchell as Roma Chamberlain
- Peter Carroll as Viscount Simonds
- Gary Waddell as Constable Jones
- Susan Lyons as Dr Thompson (uncredited)
- Edwin Hodgeman as Government Prosecutor

== Critical response ==
On Rotten Tomatoes Black and White has an approval rating of 43% based on reviews from 7 critics. Australian reviewers praised it as "the sort of film Australia should be making" and "another notch in the belt for the Australian film industry". On its theatrical release in the UK, reviewers called it "[a] gripping, well-crafted tale", and "a challenging film that dares to trust our intelligence".!-- "[a] watchable fictionalisation [that is] interestingly ambiguous where another sort of film might have been content with PC certainty". - review not found --> However Philip French, writing in The Observer, called it "heavy handed".

== Awards ==
In 2003, David Ngoombujarra won the Australian Film Institute award for Best Actor in a Supporting Role for his role.

== Festivals ==
- Sydney Film Festival 2002 (opening film)
- Toronto IFF 2002
- London International Film Festival 2002
- Hawaii International Film Festival 2002 Gala
- Pusan International Film Festival, Korea 2002
- London Australian Film Festival 2003
- Dublin Film Festival 2003
- Taipei Film Festival 2003
- Valenciennes Film Festival France 2003 Competition
- Belfast Film Festival 2003
- Taos Film Festival USA 2003
- Singapore International Film Festival 2003
- Karlovy Vary International Film Festival 2003
- SXSW USA 2004
- Beijing Australian Film Festival 2004
- Guangzhou Film Festival 2004
- Cancun Film Festival 2004
- Australian Embassy Roadshow – multiple countries

== See also ==
- Cinema of Australia
