= Fever (1988 film) =

- Theatrical release poster
- Directed by: Craig Lahiff
- Written by: John Emery; Craig Lahiff; Joe Toppe
- Produced by: Terry Jennings
- Starring: Bill Hunter; Gary Sweet; Mary Regan
- Cinematography: Robert Cribbett; David Foreman
- Edited by: Denise Haratzis
- Music by: Frank Strangio
- Distributed by: J.C. Williamson Film Distributors
- Release date: 1988
- Running time: 84 minutes
- Country: Australia
- Language: English
- Budget: AU $875,000

Fever is a 1988 Australian thriller film about an Australian policeman who finds a suitcase full of money, and the course of events which unfold when he decides to keep it. The film was directed by Craig Lahiff, and stars Bill Hunter, Gary Sweet, and Mary Regan.

== Plot ==
Sergeant Jack Wells, a tough country cop, discovers a bag of cash after a shoot out. He decides to keep the money so he and his wife Leanne can start a new life. However Leanne has a lover.

== Cast ==
- Bill Hunter as Sergeant Jack Wells
- Gary Sweet as Jeff Maslim
- Mary Regan as Leanne

== Production ==
The movie was the second of three low budget thrillers Craig Lahiff made in succession.

Writer Josephine Emery had made a short feature with Craig Lahiff. She says Lahiff's telemovie Coda sold well at the American Film Market and J. C. Williamson's approached Lahiff "with an offer of money to finance a 90-minute thriller, 'if a suitable script were written'. Craig came to me and I wrote a treatment for a thriller based around desperate people in an ugly mining town who would do almost anything to get out. We called it, Fever. Williamson's liked it, put the money up, and we were away."

The film was made with the assistance of the South Australian Film and Television Financing Fund.

The film was meant to be shot in Port Pirie but the budget did not stretch to location shooting so it was filmed in Port Adelaide.

== Release ==
The film was never released theatrically in Australia but sold widely around the world on video. It made a comfortable profit.
