= Acacia crombiei =

Pink gidgee

Conservation status
- Vulnerable (EPBC Act)

Scientific classification
- Kingdom: Plantae
- Clade: Tracheophytes
- Clade: Angiosperms
- Clade: Eudicots
- Clade: Rosids
- Order: Fabales
- Family: Fabaceae
- Subfamily: Caesalpinioideae
- Clade: Mimosoid clade
- Genus: Acacia
- Species: A. crombiei

Binomial name
- Acacia crombiei C.T.White
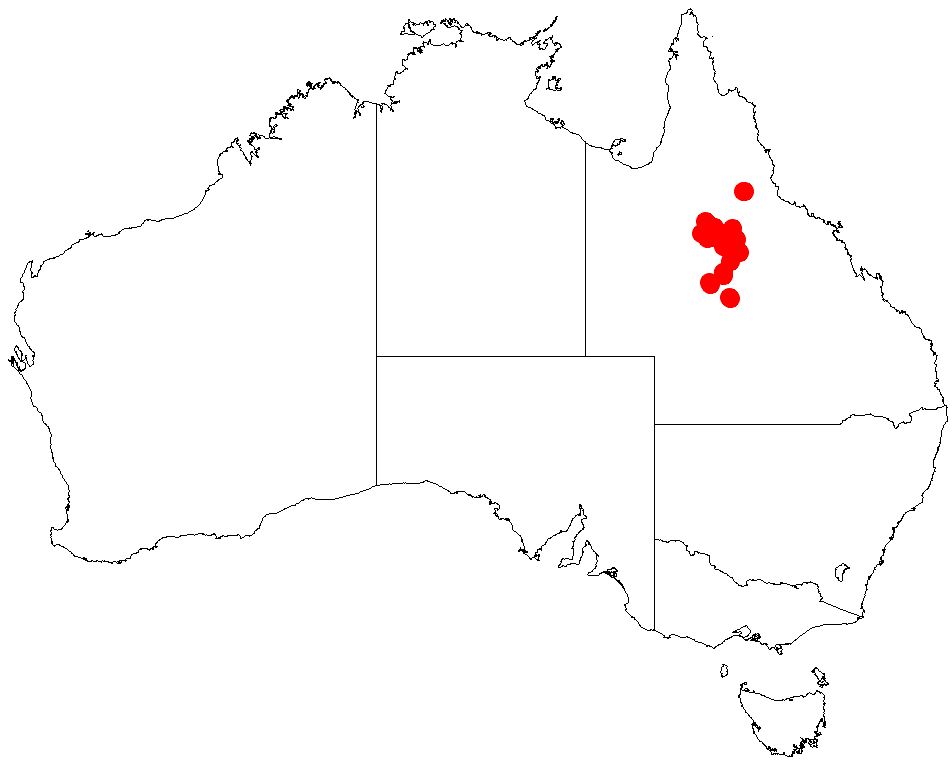
- Occurrence data from AVH

Synonyms
- Racosperma crombiei (C.T.White) Pedley

Species of legume

Acacia crombiei, commonly known as pink gidgee, is a species of flowering plant in the family Fabaceae and is endemic to Queensland Australia. It is a tree with twisted, glabrous branchlets and narrowly linear, leathery phyllodes, flowers in spherical heads and narrowly oblong firmly papery to thinly leathery pods.

== Description ==
Acacia crombiei is a tree that typically grows to a height of up to 10 m (33 ft) and has twisted, glabrous branchlets. The phyllodes are narrowly linear, straight to slightly curved, mostly 70–150 mm (2.8–5.9 in) long, 3–8 mm (0.12–0.31 in) wide, narrowed at both ends and leathery with the midrib and edge veins prominent. There is an oblong to more or less linear gland 1–2 mm (0.039–0.079 in) long, up to 4 mm (0.16 in) above the base of the phyllode. The flowers are borne in up to four spherical heads on peduncles 10–20 mm (0.39–0.79 in) long. Flowering has been recorded in April, May, August and October and the pods are narrowly oblong, firmly papery to thinly leathery, up to 100 mm (3.9 in) long and 16–22 mm (0.63–0.87 in) wide with knob-like protuberances along the midline. The seeds are oblong to widely elliptic, dark brown and slightly shiny, 8–10 mm (0.31–0.39 in) long and 7.0–8.5 mm (0.28–0.33 in) wide.

This species of wattle is reported to have a habit that is similar in appearance to Acacia cana or A. cambagei.

== Taxonomy ==
Acacia crombiei was first formally described in 1942 by Cyril Tenison White in Proceedings of the Royal Society of Queensland from specimens collected near Longreach by "J. Crombie" in 1940. The specific epithet ("crombiei") honours the collector of the type specimens.

== Distribution and habitat ==
This species of wattle grows in small, isolated populations around the small town of Muttaburra to around Elmore Station north of Richmond in central Queensland. It has been collected as far south as around Winton north over a distance of 450 km (280 mi) to around Greenvale. The species occurs in an area of around 34,000 km^{2} (13,000 sq mi) with 15 sub-populations with an estimated total population of about 20,000 individual plants. It grows in open Acacia scrub in open woodland, open forest and dry rainforest, ofen with Acacia cambagei in clay, sandy clay, loam, stony sand and gravelly soils on plains and hills.

== Conservation status ==
Acacia crombiei is listed as vulnerable under the Australian Government Environment Protection and Biodiversity Conservation Act 1999 and under the Queensland Government Nature Conservation Act 1992.

== See also ==
- List of Acacia species
