= Heaven's Burning =

- Theatrical release poster
- Directed by: Craig Lahiff
- Written by: Louis Nowra
- Produced by: Helen Leake; Al Clark
- Starring: Russell Crowe; Youki Kudoh; Kenji Isomura; Ray Barrett
- Cinematography: Brian Breheny
- Edited by: John Scott
- Music by: Michael Atkinson; Graeme Koehne
- Production companies: Australian Film Finance Corporation; Duo Art
- Distributed by: REP Distribution
- Release date: 6 November 1997
- Running time: 96 minutes
- Country: Australia
- Languages: English; Japanese
- Box office: $55,780

Heaven's Burning is a 1997 Australian crime film starring Russell Crowe and directed by Craig Lahiff. The film was released in Australia on 6 November 1997. It follows the adventures of an Australian getaway driver (Crowe) and a Japanese runaway bride (Youki Kudoh) on a road trip as they are pursued by both criminals and the police. This was Russell Crowe's last Australian film until 2014's The Water Diviner.

== Plot ==
Japanese bride Midori Takada (Youki Kudoh) arrives in Sydney with her new husband Yukio (Kenji Isomura). She believes her marriage is a mistake and uses the honeymoon as a means to escape. Colin O'Brien (Russell Crowe) is an experienced getaway driver. He is hired by an Australian-Afghan family to help rob a bank. During the robbery one member is killed. Midori is in the bank at the same time and they grab her as a hostage. After escaping, the two Afghan brothers decide to get rid of her. Colin will not allow this. He kills one of the brothers and threatens to shoot the other, Mahood (Robert Mammone). He and Midori escape.

Colin wishes to travel to see his father, Cam, at his ranch because he has not seen him in years. Midori chooses to stay with Colin. The duo rob a bank to fund their trip. Mahood and his father, Boorjan (Petru Gheorghiu), swear revenge and set out to catch Colin. The police, aware of the Afghan family's illegal activities, are also in pursuit. Yukio is told of his wife's involvement and he is aware that she left him by choice. His honor injured, he goes to find her.

Colin and Midori venture across New South Wales. The Afghans catch up with Colin and begin to torture him, but Colin manages to kill the patriarch and remaining son. Yukio searches for Midori, killing people along the way. Colin and Midori eventually reach the ranch owned by his father, Cam (Ray Barrett). The duo stays for a short while and officially become lovers. They then leave to visit the seashore.

Yukio reaches the ranch soon after and threatens Cam with death if he does not tell him where Midori has gone. Cam responds that he believes in karma and Yukio will soon pay for his evil ways. Enraged, shoots Cam; he then drowns him. After some setbacks, Yukio catches up with the lovers and shoots Colin in the torso. Midori retrieves a gun from their car and shoots Yukio, who then shoots her in the side. He tells her that he still loves her, but she counters that he does not know what love is and then kills him. The police hear about the shootout and chase the lovers. Midori drives while Colin is slowly dying in the passenger's seat. They reach the shore, but their car rolls over and catches fire. She shoots herself and the car explodes. The police watch as the car burns.

== Cast ==
- Russell Crowe as Colin O'Brien
- Youki Kudoh as Midori Takada
- Kenji Isomura as Yukio Takada
- Ray Barrett as Cam O'Brien
- Robert Mammone as Mahood
- Petru Gheorghiu as Boorjan
- Colin Hay as Jonah (cameo)
- Salvatore Coco as Gulbuddin
- Matthew Dyktynski as Moffat
- Gina Zoia as Bank Teller
- Mark Hembrow as Truck Driver
- Don Barker as Drinker
- Susan Prior as Sharon
- Norman Kaye as Store Owner
- Kate Fitzpatrick as Gloria
- Gary Waddell as Motel Manager

== Reception ==
The film earned $55,780 from its limited release in Australian theatres.

The film received mixed reviews. David Stratton from Variety gave a favourable review, calling the film "an energetic road movie that keeps careening off in unexpected directions". Movie-vault.com gave the film 5 out of 10, commenting that for an 'action/drama' film, the film had little action and did not perform well as a drama. Time Out's review stated the film took a while to take off, and had some criticism of the plot and acting, but noted the director "manages to balance the action and human interest".

== DVD release ==
The film was released on DVD on 7 November 2000. It was presented in 2.35:1 widescreen. Reviewers complained of the amount of grain in the footage, also not impressed by marks and spots on the film. It featured Dolby Stereo 2.0 sound however the sound was criticised for being mixed in too low, and being difficult to understand at times. The DVD did receive praise for the number of extras it included. Umbrella Entertainment released the film on Blu-ray and DVD in 2018; only the former contains extra features.

== See also ==
- Cinema of Australia
- Russell Crowe filmography
