= Craig Lahiff =

Australian film director (1947–2014)

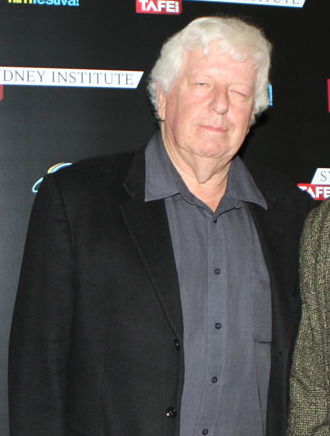
- Craig Lahiff
- Born: April 23, 1947; Adelaide, South Australia, Australia
- Died: February 2, 2014 (aged 66)
- Education: Bachelor of Science
- Alma mater: University of Adelaide, Flinders University
- Occupation: Film director
- Known for: Directing films such as Coda, Fever, Heaven's Burning, and Swerve
- Children: Sean Lahiff, Daland Lahiff (twins)
- Awards: AFI nomination (1988)

Craig Lahiff (23 April 1947 – 2 February 2014) was an Australian film director. He grew up in the Adelaide suburb of Somerton Park and studied science at the University of Adelaide, then trained as a systems consultant before studying arts in film at Flinders University. He began working in the film industry on crews for movies such as Sunday Too Far Away and The Fourth Wish.

After making a number of short films he directed Coda (1987) a TV movie about a serial killer. The following year he earned an AFI nomination for his feature debut Fever, which was not released to cinemas but sold widely on DVD and video and made a profit.

Lahiff died on 2 February 2014. At the time of his death he was developing two film noirs with regular producer Helen Leake as part of a film noir trilogy started by Swerve, and a biopic of General Sir John Monash with frequent collaborator Louis Nowra. He married in 1976 but the marriage was dissolved. He had twin sons, Sean and Daland. Sean Lahiff was editor for his father's film Swerve.

== Filmography ==
=== As director ===
- Labyrinth (1979) – short
- The Coming (1981) – short
- Coda (1987)
- Fever (1989)
- Strangers (1991)
- Ebbtide (1994)
- Heaven's Burning (1997)
- Black and White (2002)
- Swerve (2011)

=== As producer ===
- The Dreaming (1988)
