= Ltyentye Apurte Community =

Community in the Northern Territory, Australia

Ltyentye Apurte Community Northern Territory
- Coordinates: 24.130391°S 134.374341°E
- Population: 708
  - Density: 0.5664/km^{2} (1.467/sq mi)
- Established: 1952
- Area: 1,250 km^{2} (482.6 sq mi)
- LGA(s): MacDonnell Shire
- Region: Alice Springs Region
- Federal division(s): Lingiari

Ltyentye Apurte, also known as Santa Teresa, is a community in the Northern Territory, Australia, many residents of the locality are members of the Arrernte indigenous community, whose origins are located about 80 kilometres (50 mi) south-east of Alice Springs.

== History ==
The mission run by the Missionaries of the Sacred Heart at Arltunga was moved to Santa Teresa in 1953. It included a Mission school and dormitories which accommodated Aboriginal children aged 5 to 17 years. Hospital care was provided. Father Thomas Dixon was responsible for the church.

In 1976, administration was passed from the Mission to an Aboriginal land trust and the community was renamed Ltyentye Apurte. Although the residential section of the Mission school was closed in the same year, the day school remains operational and in the hands of the church.

The Keringke Arts Centre was established in 1989. Since 2007 women in the community have painted religious crosses which are exported to Catholic churches around the world.

In 1996, the population was recorded at 458, rising to 932 in 2011 and to 684 in 2016 and 708 in 2021.

According to data from the 2011 census, Santa Teresa is the most Catholic place in Australia.

On November 1, 2023, a landmark legal case was won in the High Court by two public housing tenants in Santa Teresa. The court ruled that NT Housing was liable for any emotional distress caused due to a failure to maintain the houses, and as such the tenants can sue for damages.

== Governance ==
The community is governed by a Community Government Council which runs the health service (with dialysis room) and some other facilities. The community contains a Catholic primary/senior school, police station, airstrip and Catholic Church. Since 1 July 2008, the MacDonnell Shire is the responsible local government for the area.

== Sport ==
Australian rules football is popular there, with matches played at the Santa Teresa Local Stadium which was resurfaced from sand loam to grass in 2021 through a project in partnership with the AFL's Melbourne Football Club Red and Blue Foundation.

== Awards ==
In 2019, Ltyentye Apurte won the Australian Tidy Town Awards competition and is named Australian most sustainable Community.
