= Raising a Husband =

- Genre: Game show
- Presented by: Alwyn Kurts
- Country of origin: Australia
- Original language: English

Production
- Producer: Dorothy Crawford
- Cinematography: Norman Spencer
- Running time: 30 minutes
- Production company: Crawford Productions

Original release
- Network: GTV-9
- Release: 1957 – 1958

Raising a Husband is an Australian television game show which aired in 1957 to 1958. Information on this series is extremely scarce. Hosted by Alwyn Kurts, it commenced as a 3XY radio show, and was later shown on television on station GTV-9 in Melbourne, and was produced by Crawford Productions. Crawford also produced several other 1950s Australian television series, including the game show Wedding Day, comedy series Take That, and children's series Peters Club.

== Game play ==
Three married couples were asked a series of questions on domestic problems to determine which was "the most human husband"

== Episode status ==
Is it not known how many episodes exist as Kinescope recordings. An episode from 27 June 1957 is held by National Film and Sound Archive, along with an additional episode from an unknown date.

== See also ==
- The Pressure Pak Show
- The Dulux Show
- Give it a Go
