= Joff Ellen =

Australian entertainer, actor and comedian

- Born: Raymond Charles Ellen; 20 May 1915; Myrtleford, Victoria, Australia
- Died: 24 December 1999 (aged 84); Leongatha, Victoria, Australia
- Occupations: Actor; radio personality; vaudevillian; comedian; host; entertainer
- Years active: 1939–1976
- Known for: The Tarax Show, In Melbourne Tonight, Peters Club
- Spouse: Bernadette Moyna Shaw (m. 1946)

Raymond Charles Ellen (20 May 1915 at Myrtleford – 24 December 1999 at Leongatha), who performed as Joff Ellen, was an Australian entertainer, TV pioneer, actor and comedian. As a children's TV entertainer, he portrayed "Joffa Boy" on Tarax Show (1957–1969), greeting the audience with his catch-cry, "Howdy-doody, boys and girls and mums and dads and bald-headed babies". As simply, "Joff" he also appeared on adult variety shows, In Melbourne Tonight (IMT) and later The Graham Kennedy Show, spanning from 1958 to 1974, both hosted by Graham Kennedy.

== Biography ==
Raymond Charles Ellen was born in 1915, as the youngest son of C. Ellen. He was nicknamed "Joff" by his uncle in honour of French World War 1 general, Joseph Joffre. In 1939 Ellen formed a comedy trio: Joff, Buddy (McDonald) and June (Brown). By June 1945 the trio were working on Melbourne radio station 3XY. Throughout World War II Ellen's trio also performed vaudeville acts for the troops and after the war he continued with comedy shows on 3XY and on stage. In September 1946 Ellen married Bernadette Moyna Shaw in Melbourne. Shaw was a ballet member of Ellen's revue, Sky High, which was managed by his future father-in-law, Gordon Shaw. The couple honeymooned in Tasmania.

Ellen's only known film role was as "Joss" in Alexander Roy Harwood's last effort as director, Night Club (1952). It is one of only a handful of films made in Melbourne in that decade, where he appeared with the artist and actor Valma Howell, to whom he had been briefly engaged.

From the introduction of television in Victoria, he appeared on various children's shows as the character "Joffa Boy", particularly Tarax Show (1957–1969), wearing a Carlton Football Club jumper and "Bombay Bloomers", with large suspenders that he would manipulate for comic effect. His entrance song (written by resident ventriloquist, Ron Blaskett) was recorded by the show's girls choir along with musical director Margot Sheridan:

Choir: "Who is that peeping round the corner?
It's not Jack Spratt or Little Johnny Horner."

- (Joffa then peers around the corner of the set entrance and sings the next line)*

Joffa: "I'm the chap who always has a grin"
Choir: "Joffa Boy! Joffa Boy! Please come in."

Ellen would greet the audience with "Howdy Doody, boys and girls!", which would respond "Howdy Doody, Joffa Boy!". He expanded the greeting which became his catch-cry, "Howdy-doody, boys and girls and mums and dads and bald-headed babies". He also portrayed the naughty schoolboy, "Conkers" in the slapstick series Take That (1957–59) for Crawford Productions, which is reputed to be Australia's first TV sitcom.

He became nationally famous for appearances with Graham Kennedy on the latter's television shows In Melbourne Tonight (IMT) and later The Graham Kennedy Show spanning from 1958 to 1974 in which he employed a variety of song-and-dance, comedy sketches and other vaudevillian skills. In one of his last comedy bits, after shoving Kennedy a little too hard during horseplay, Ellen quipped, "I'm retired now [so] don't need the money."

== Influence ==
In Graham Kennedy's last television interview, on his 60th birthday, he told Ray Martin that in the first few years of IMT, the comedy sketches were mainly devised by Ellen recreating old Tivoli and vaudeville shtick, rather than using new writers. Kennedy credited learning a great deal of his physical and visual comedy from Ellen, whom he respected.

== Personal life ==
Ellen retired in 1976 and lived in Tarwin Lower with his wife, Bernadette. The couple were married for 53 years. He died in Leongatha hospital after a short illness in 1999, aged 84.
