= Prime Time (Australian TV series) =

- Genre: Drama; Soap opera
- Created by: Terry Stapleton
- Country of origin: Australia
- Original language: English
- No. of seasons: 1
- No. of episodes: 60

Production
- Executive producers: Hector Crawford; Ian Crawford; Terry Stapleton
- Producer: Graham Moore
- Production company: Crawford Productions

Original release
- Network: Nine Network
- Release: 30 January 1986 – 10 January 1987

Prime Time is an Australian soap opera drama television series produced by Crawford Productions that aired on the Nine Network in from January 1986 to January 1987. Prime Time was the last Australian soap produced with exterior location scenes shot on film and interior scenes shot on videotape. The series was not a popular success and was cancelled after sixty episodes.

== Premise ==
The series was set at a fictional television station, Channel 5, and dealt with the behind-the-scenes goings-on on the set of a current affairs series called Assignment.

== Cast ==
- Chris Orchard as David Lockhart
- Anthony Hawkins as Harry Jones
- Nina Landis as Kate Macarthur
- Peter Kowitz as Jim Donnegan
- David Whitney as Stephen Lockhart
- Julianne White as Diana Fields
- Peter Whitford as Charles Garrett
- Gary Sweet as Craig Lawrence
- Sonja Tallis as Georgina Jones
- Tottie Goldsmith as Jamie
- Katrina Foster as Jocelyn Cole
- Ben Mendelsohn as Bart Jones
- John Hannan as John Balenko
- Jane Hall as Sandy Lockhart
- Kathy Caswell as Carol Foster
- Antonia Murphy as Kylie Garrett
- Ross Newton as Danny Eilwood
- Garry McDonald
- Rachel Friend
- Peter Phelps

== Reception ==
In 2020, Fiona Byrne of the Herald Sun included Prime Time in her feature about "Truly terrible TV shows that flopped". Of the show, she stated: "Prime Time was a little watched, long-forgotten drama series which screened on Channel 9 for one season in 1986."
