= Don't Argue =

Don't Argue may refer to:

- "Don't Argue" (song), a song by Cabaret Voltaire
- Don't Argue (TV series), an Australian television series
