= Olivia Hamnett =

English actress

- Hamnett in her stint in TV series Prisoner in 1982 as Dr. Kate Peterson
- Born: Olivia Jane Hamnett; 13 February 1943; St Helens, Lancashire, England
- Died: 2 November 2001 (aged 58); Malvern, Victoria, Australia
- Occupation: Actress
- Years active: 1963–2000
- Spouse: Peter Regan (m. 1973)

Olivia Jane Hamnett (13 February 1943 – 2 November 2001) was an English actress known for numerous television roles in Australia, primarily in soap operas and miniseries. including The Sullivans as Meg Fulton in 1979, in Prisoner as Dr. Kate Peterson, who was a supporting cast member in 1981–82 and in Return to Eden 1983 and 1985 as Joanna Randall.

== Early life ==
Hamnett was born in 1943, in St Helens, Lancashire, England.

== Career ==
Hamnett started her acting career in theatre, before moving into television in the early 1960s, with guest roles on series, including Department S and Randall and Hopkirk (Deceased) in 1969.

After emigrating to Australia in the 1970s, she found even greater onscreen success. She initially secured minor roles in series such as Bellbird and a number of the Crawford Production staples, before being cast in more significant roles. She was best known for her performances in cult series Prisoner as Dr. Kate Peterson and The Sullivans as Meg Fulton, as well as both the original miniseries and the regular series of Return to Eden.

Hamnett also played major roles on such series as Rush, The Power, The Passion, Chances, Pacific Drive, Neighbours and Blue Heelers.

She portrayed Richard Chamberlain's wife in The Last Wave (1977), and played Ricky Schroder's character's mother in The Earthling (1980).

== Personal life ==
Hamnett married actor Peter Regan in 1973. She died in November 2001 in Malvern, Victoria from a brain tumour at the age of 58.

Her husband English Australian actor Peter Regan, who was perhaps best known for his role locally on the Crawford Productions serial The Box from 1974 until 1976 as tonight host Gary Burke, died on 3 August 2026, aged 92.

== Filmography ==
=== Film ===
Year	Title	Role	Type
1966	The Spy with a Cold Nose	Uncredited	Feature film UK
1977	The Last Wave	Annie Burton	Feature film
1980	The Earthling	Bettina Daley	Feature film
1994	Ebbtide	Committal Judge	Feature film
1999	Joe Wilkinson	Mrs Wilkinson	Feature film UK

=== Television ===
Year	Title	Role	Type
1963	Drama 61-67	Sue	TV series UK, 1 episode
1964	Compact	Billie	TV series UK, 1 episode
1964	Taxi!	Waitress	TV series UK, 1 episode
1964	World of His Own	unknown role	TV series UK, 1 episode
1969	Department S	Anita	TV series UK, 1 episode
1969	Randall and Hopkirk (Deceased)	Anne Soames	TV series UK, 1 episode
1971	Bachelor Father	Vicki	TV series
1972-1975	Division 4	Lindy / Charlene Boucher / Sue Miller	TV series, 3 episodes
1973	Boney	Diana Rockwell	TV series, 1 episode
1973	Son of the Bride	Angela	TV series UK, 6 episodes
1973	New Scotland Yard	Rosalind	TV series UK, 1 episode
1973	The Gentlemen of Titipu	Voice	Animated TV movie
1973	The Comedy Game		TV series, 1 episode: "Fat Max"
1974	Matlock Police	Roberta Hughes	TV series, 1 episode
1974	This Love Affair	Nadine Rourke	Anthology TV series, 1 episode
1974-1976	Homicide	Rosalind Clayton / Mrs. Lovejoy / Bernice Anderson / Interviewer	TV series, 4 episodes
1974	Out of Love		Anthology TV series, episode: "Where Did All The Love Go?"
1974	Rush	Sarah Lucas	TV series, 12 episodes
1975	Quality of Mercy	Helen	TV series, 1 episode: "Sally Go Round The Moon"
1975	The Last of the Australians	Receptionist	TV series, season 2, episode: "Stars Trek"
1976	Bellbird		TV series
1976	Bobby Dazzler	Della McDermott	TV series, 14 episodes
1976	Obsession - Error of Judgement		Teleplay
1977	Ripkin	Ruth Clifford	TV movie
1978	Plunge Into Darkness	Pat Keating	TV movie
1979	The Sullivans	Meg Fulton	TV series, episodes 594–632
1979	The John Sullivan Story	Captain. Meg Fulton	TV movie
1981–1982	Prisoner	Dr. Kate Petersen	TV series, 39 episodes
1982	Cop Shop	Audrey Mason	TV series, 1 episode
1983	Return to Eden	Joanna Randall	TV miniseries, 3 episodes
1984	The Young Wife	Patricia Barwing	TV movie
1986	Return to Eden	Joanna Randall	TV series, 3 episodes
1986	A Country Practice	Jessie Kershaw	TV series, 2 episodes
1986	Tusitala	Lady Jersey	TV miniseries, 3 episodes
1987	Coda	Det. Sgt. Turner	TV movie
1989	The Power, The Passion	Ellen Bryne Edmonds	TV series, 167 episodes
1990	The Paper Man	Irene Hampden	TV miniseries
1990	G.P.	Dr. Peg Chisholm	TV series, 1 episode
1990	Skirts		TV series, 1 episode
1991	Chances	Rhonda	TV series, 12 episodes
1992	A Country Practice	Barbara Sajinovic	TV series, 2 episodes
1994	Blue Heelers	Gwen Burton	TV series, 1 episode
1994	Law of the Land	Blanche Avery	TV series, 1 episode
1997	Pacific Drive	Mara de Villenois / Devlin #2	TV series
1997	The Ripper	Lady Margaret	TV movie, US
1998	Neighbours	Hilary Grant	TV series, 2 episodes
2000	Blue Heelers	Dr. Ellen McCarthy	TV series, 1 episode
2000	The Games	Sponsor	TV series, 1 episode

== Theatre ==
Year	Title	Role	Type
1963–1964	Monsieur Blaise	Genevieve	Bristol Hippodrome, Winter Gardens, Blackpool, Theatre Royal, Brighton, Royal Court Theatre, London, Phoenix Theatre, London with Marcellus Productions
1965–1972	Charlie Girl		Adelphi Theatre, London, St. James Theatre, Auckland, Her Majesty's Theatre, Melbourne with J. C. Williamson
1987–1988	Wife Begins at Forty	Betty Dixon	Playhouse, Adelaide, Comedy Theatre, Melbourne, Grand Theatre, Wolverhampton, His Majesty's Theatre, Aberdeen, Alexandra Theatre, Birmingham, Theatre Royal, Brighton, Theatre Royal, Norwich, Theatre Royal, Lincoln
1993	M. Butterfly	Helga	Playhouse, Melbourne, Canberra Theatre, Seymour Centre, Sydney with MTC & Harry M. Miller
1995	The Best of British: Rookery Nook / When We Are Married		Mietta's Melbourne for Melbourne International Comedy Festival
