= George Spartels =

Australian actor (born 1954)

- Born: George Bernard Spartels; 25 April 1954 (age 72); Carlton, Melbourne, Australia
- Occupations: Actor; children's presenter; director; playwright; musician
- Years active: 1971–present
- Known for: Neighbours as Benito Alessi; Presenter of Play School
- Spouses: Sue Spartels (divorced); Elizabeth Alexander (m. 1984; div. 2006); Mary Spartels (m. 2013; div. 2017)
- Children: 2

George Bernard Spartels (born 25 April 1954) is an Australian actor, presenter, director, playwright and children's musician. He remains best known for his role on the television soap opera Neighbours and as a presenter on Play School.

== Early life ==
Spartels was born in Carlton, Melbourne to a father of Greek descent and a mother of English and Irish descent.

He undertook his education in Melbourne and was a talented swimmer and football player, but without the height required to play professionally, he turned to acting. While studying at Teacher's College, he honed his acting skills, appearing in amateur theatre productions.

== Career ==
=== Television ===
Spartels has guest starred in many Australian television series from the 1970s to the present. His earliest roles included five television police procedural series: Division 4, Homicide, Matlock Police, Bluey and Cop Shop. and Crawford Productions comedy series The Bluestone Boys. He also had notable roles in Bellbird and Prisoner and appeared in early 1980s soap opera Punishment.

In 1984, Spartels played the recurring role Nick Poulopoulos in television series Sweet and Sour, before appearing in the 1985 feature film Mad Max Beyond Thunderdome, the third installment in the Mad Max franchise, alongside Mel Gibson and Tina Turner, playing the role of Blackfinger.

That same year, Spartels began an ongoing role as a children's television presenter, with a long tenure on the ABC's Play School, over a period of 16 years between 1985 and 2001. He later performed in children's concerts, including George Meets the Orchestra with the Queensland Philharmonic in 2001 and live productions of Play School in 2009. He released several albums for children, as 'George from Playschool' which included songs such as "Surfing with the Seagulls" (1993) and "Return of the Spangled Drongo" (1999).

From 1992 to 1993, Spartels secured a role in long-running soap opera Neighbours, playing the regular character of family patriarch Benito Alessi. He also appeared in several episodes of medical drama series All Saints before playing Theo Karandonis, Carbo's father in drama series Packed to the Rafters from 2009 to 2012.

=== Theatre ===
Spartels also performed in numerous theatre productions. He began his professional career in the Melbourne production of Godspell in 1972. From 1981 to 1983, he played Amos in a Sydney Theatre Company production of Chicago.

He appeared in Greek Tragedy at Sydney's Belvoir Theatre from 1989 to 1990, and in 1998 played the role of Mercutio in a Neil Armfield-directed Romeo and Juliet for the South Australian Theatre Company. Spartels performed in several Company B / Belvoir productions, including The Spook in 2004, under the direction of Armfield once more.

In 2014, Spartels toured Toronto, Los Angeles and Australia in an international stage production of The Last Confession opposite David Suchet, playing the roles of Cardinal Lorscheider and Eugênio Sales.

== Depiction in art ==
Spartels' photoportrait, by Ivan Gaal, is in the permanent collection of the National Portrait Gallery.

== Personal life ==
Spartels was married to first wife, Sue. He then married actress Elizabeth Alexander in 1984, with whom he shares two daughters. Both of his daughters featured in the music video for his single "Busy Baby Bubby". Spartels and Alexander divorced in 2006. Spartels married for a third time in April 2013 to wife Mary, and they resided together in Sydney. They were divorced in 2017, after which time he returned to Melbourne.

== Filmography ==
=== Film ===
Year	Title	Role	Type
1977	Out of It	Tony	Short film
1978	Blue Fin	Con	Feature film
1985	Mad Max Beyond Thunderdome	Blackfinger	Feature film
1988	Computer Ghosts	Pi Wratich	TV movie
1989	Action Replay		TV movie
1992	Seeing Red	Mark	Feature film
1999	Kick	Jack Grant	Feature film
2023	The Adventures of Wolfdogg and Redridinghood	Narrator	Short film

=== Television ===
Year	Title	Role	Type
1971-75	Matlock Police	Danny Porter, Willie Bennett, Walters, Frank Clark, Bob	TV series, 5 episodes
1972-75	Division 4	Harry, Terry Hughes, Gino Napoli, Youth1	TV series, 4 episodes
1971-76	Homicide	John Smith, Russell Knight, Simon Littlewood, Nick Pappas, Peter Fletcher, Anton Palades, Mechanic	TV series, 7 episodes
1974	This Love Affair		TV series, 1 episode
1976	Solo One	Harry Thomas	TV series, 1 episode
	Bellbird		TV series
1976	The Bluestone Boys		TV series
1976-77	Bluey	Steve Berry, Wilson	TV series, 2 episodes
1977	Bobby Dazzler	George	TV series, 3 episodes
1977	Hotel Story		TV series
1978	Father, Dear Father in Australia	George	TV series, 1 episode
1978-89	Cop Shop	Claudio Gustino, Chris Murray, Fergus	TV series, 3 episodes
1979	Chopper Squad	Man in hang glider	TV series, 1 episode
1979-80	Prisoner	Herbie	TV series, 5 episodes
1981	Punishment	David 'Robbo' Roberts	TV series
1984	Sweet and Sour	Nick Poulopolous	TV series, 18 episodes
1985-99	Play School	Presenter	TV series
1986	The Great Bookie Robbery	Jaffa Davis	TV miniseries, 3 episodes
1990	Rafferty's Rules	Stefan Bosnjack	TV series, 1 episode
1991	All Together Now	Georgie Leonard	TV series, 1 episode
1992-93	Neighbours	Benito Alessi	TV series, 47 episodes
1997	Fallen Angels	Dan Playhard	TV series, 1 episode
2002-06	All Saints	The Professor, Craig Watts, Peter Talbot	TV series, 3 episodes
2009	City Homicide	Frank Scarsdale	TV series, 1 episode
2009-12	Packed to the Rafters	Theo Karandonis, Carbo's father	TV series, 4 episodes

== Theatre ==
Year	Title	Role	Type	Ref.
1971	Godspell	Alternative	Playbox Theatre, Melbourne	
1973	The Two Gentlemen of Verona	Speed	J. C. Williamson's	
1973	Salad Days		J. C. Williamson's	
1974	Love for Love		Old Tote Theatre Company, Sydney	
1974	Macbeth		Old Tote Theatre Company, Sydney	
	Lear		Old Tote Theatre Company, Sydney	
	The Indian Wants the Bronx		Old Tote Theatre Company, Sydney	
	Equus	Boy	State Theatre of South Australia	
1978	Dracula	R.M. Renfield	Festival Centre Trust, Her Majesty's Theatre, Sydney	
1979	P.S. Your Cat Is Dead	Vito (Lead)	Festival Centre Trust	
1980	The Sunny South		Sydney Opera House with STC	
1980	I'm Getting My Act Together and Taking It on the Road	Joe, Manager (Lead)	Sydney Opera House with STC	
1981	Hamlet	Laertes	Sydney Theatre Company by invitation to Hong Kong Festival	
1981–1983	Chicago	Amos Hart	Sydney Opera House, Theatre Royal, Sydney, Comedy Theatre, Melbourne, Festival Theatre, Adelaide, Hong Kong Arts Festival with STC	
1983	Variations: Chamber Music for Nine Players and Six Instruments	Steve	Nimrod Theatre Company, Sydney	
1983	Signal Driver	First Being	Melbourne Athenaeum with MTC / QTC	
	Vocations	Ross	State Theatre of South Australia	
1985	Zastrozzi	Bernado	Seymour Centre, Sydney with Nimrod Theatre Company	
1986	The Levine Comedy	Asher Levine	Russell St Theatre, Melbourne with MTC	
1988	Capricornia	Peter Differ / Charles Kit	Belvoir St Theatre, Sydney & tour	
1989–1990	Greek Tragedy	Larry	Belvoir St Theatre, Sydney with Company B & Pioneer Theatres, London	
1992	Stool Pigeon	One man show	Sydney Festival	
1998	Romeo and Juliet	Mercutio	South Australian Theatre Company	
	Twelfth Night	Sir Toby Belch	Q Theatre	
2004	The Spook	George / Footballer	Belvoir St Theatre, Sydney with Company B	
2006	Losing Louis	Tony	Ensemble Theatre, Sydney	
2008	Scorched	Various	Belvoir St Theatre, Sydney with Company B	
2014	The Last Confession	Cardinal Lorscheider / Eugênio Sales	Ahmanson Theatre, Los Angeles, Toronto & Australia tour with Tinderbox	
2022	Bad Machine	Theo	Casula Powerhouse Arts Centre	

== Awards and nominations ==
Year	Nominated work	Award	Category	Result
1993	ARIA Music Awards	George from Play School	Best Children's Album	Nominated
1998	ARIA Music Awards	Let's Go Out	Best Children's Album	Nominated
2001	ARIA Music Awards	George Meets The Orchestra	Best Children's Album	Nominated
