= Alwyn Kurts =

Australian actor

- Born: Alwyn Cecil Kurts; 28 October 1915; Perth, Western Australia, Australia
- Died: 4 May 2000 (aged 84); Melbourne, Victoria, Australia
- Occupations: Radio announcer, journalist, game show host, actor
- Years active: 1942-1999

Alwyn Cecil Kurts (28 October 1915 – 4 May 2000) was an Australian drama and comedy actor of radio, television and film, best remembered for his role as gruff Inspector Colin Fox in the TV series Homicide and Ted Cook in the sitcom The Last of the Australians.

Kurts was an early Australian radio announcer who became well known primarily as a character actor. Of many notable roles, he played a young Mel Gibson's father in the Australian film Tim.

== Early life ==
Kurts was born one of seven to father, Alwyn Cecil Kurts Snr, a "handsome young man of Polish-Jewish origin" and mother, Laura Mabel Rosamond Claydon. His father was a gambler who abandoned his wife and children in the late 1920s.

Alwyn Kurts Sr. became a well-known radio personality between the 1930s and the early 1950s under the name Donald Day.

Kurts' six siblings included sister Raigh Roe, who became a CWA president, ABC commissioner and 1977 Australian of the Year.

== Career ==
=== Radio ===
Kurts began his career on breakfast radio on Perth station 6PR in 1942. He then became an accredited war correspondent reporting from Burma, New Guinea and the Philippines; in 1975 he told writer George Wilson he 'was lucky enough to be one of the first 20 Allied people in on the recapture of Singapore.' After the war he moved to 3XY in Melbourne with programs Raising a Husband, Tye's Radio Revue, Radio Revels, which Kurts later recalled was a 'soldier show where the armed forces were invited on stage to do a number', all popular in the late 1940s.

In September 1950 he reported from Korea for XY, interviewing Australian servicemen. The program was also broadcast on 2UW and 4BK.

=== Television ===
Kurts' television career started when he began hosting the HSV 7 show Wedding Day, followed almost immediately with a version of his radio show Raising a Husband for GTV-9. Both of these shows, and many more, including Hutton's Family Quiz, Don't Argue and Fighting Words were made by Crawford Productions.

Kurts made the successful transition to drama in television series Homicide. After a 1968 appearance as criminal Frank Inglis, he took on the role of country-based Inspector Colin Fox for another episode the same year. He returned as a core cast member the following year, playing Fox, complete with the back story that he had worked in Homicide twenty years earlier and was seeking a change after the recent death of his wife. Fox formally assumed the Inspector role on 27 May. Kurts remained with the show for four years and his character was killed off in July 1973. For a brief time in the same year he was the compère ('The Beast') of the Australian version of the television panel show Beauty and the Beast, of which he later said 'I take credit for only one thing - I buried it. Maybe that's a bit hard but I was glad when it ended.' After this he starred in another Crawfords production, comedy series The Last of the Australians, playing war veteran Ted Cook.

In 1977, he had a recurring guest role on soap opera Bellbird as trotting trainer Wes Lewis. In 1982, he appeared in the Australian TV drama Cop Shop.

=== Film ===
Kurts appeared in the 1979 movie Tim, starring Mel Gibson, for which he won an Australian Film Institute Award for his portrayal of the father of the titular character. During his later career, he had key roles in the films Spotswood (1991) opposite Anthony Hopkins, Ben Mendelsohn and Russell Crowe, playing the role of Mr Ball, and Road to Nhill (1997) in the role of Jack.

== Personal life ==
Kurts was married twice. His first wedding, to Jean Doreen Pember, was at St. Alban's Church, in Highgate Hill, on 24 April 1935. The marriage lasted four and a half years and ended in divorce on 8 November 1939, on the grounds of his adultery with vaudeville artist Dulcie Kelly.

His second marriage, to 'champion footrunner' Eileen Margaret O'Hehir, took place on 10 August 1940 and sustained until his death. Kurts had three children: Nola May (1934–1979) from his first marriage and Michael (1942–) and Elizabeth (1945–) from his second.

Kurts supported the 1972 campaign for the election of Gough Whitlam and the Labor Party.

== Death ==
Kurts died in Melbourne on 4 May 2000, aged 84 in Melbourne, Australia, from liver failure.

== Awards ==
| Year | Title | Role | Notes | Ref. |
|---|---|---|---|---|
| 1979 | Tim | Australian Film Institute Award | AACTA Award for Best Actor in a Supporting Role | Won |
| 1991 | Spotswood | Australian Film Institute Award | AACTA Award for Best Actor in a Supporting Role | Nominated |

== Filmography ==
=== Film ===
| Year | Title | Role | Notes |
|---|---|---|---|
| 1979 | Tim | Ron Melville | Feature film. Won Australian Film Institute Award for Best Supporting Actor |
| 1980 | The Earthling | Christian Neilson | Feature film |
| 1992 | Spotswood (aka The Efficiency Expert | Mr. Ball | Feature film |
| 1993 | This Won't Hurt a Bit | Psychiatrist | Feature film |
| 1997 | Road to Nhill | Jack | Feature film |

=== Television ===
| Year | Title | Role | Notes |
|---|---|---|---|
| 1957–1958 | Raising a Husband | Host | |
| 1959 | Hutton's Family Quiz | Host | |
| 1959 | Don't Argue | Host | |
| 1968 | Hunter | Sir Benjamin Hart | Episode: "The Lost One" |
| 1968–1973 | Homicide | Inspector Colin Fox (main role) | |
| 1959 | Hunter | Ron White | Episode: "A Matter of Immunity" |
| 1959 | Division 4 | Sinclair | Episode: "The Sunday Mother" |
| 1973 | And Millions Will Die | Dr. Mitchell | TV film |
| 1974 | Rush | Lansdowne (recurring role) | |
| 1975 | Shannon's Mob | Alan Merritt | Episode: "Stock in Trade" |
| 1975–1976 | The Last of the Australians | Ted Cook (main role) | |
| 1959 | The Alternative | Doherty | TV film |
| 1959 | McCloud | Superintendent Harold Caldwell | Episode: "Night of the Shark" |
| 1959 | Solo One | Alfonso | Episode: "Goodbye George" |
| 1977 | Bellbird | Wes Lewis | 6 episodes |
| 1978 | The Newman Shame | Steven Ogilvie | TV film |
| 1978 | Loss of Innocence | Leonard | Miniseries, 2 episodes |
| 1978 | Chopper Squad | Richard Hayle | Episode: "A Dream Before Dying" |
| 1980 | All the Green Year | Narrator / Older Charlie Reeves (voice) | Miniseries |
| 1982 | ..Deadline.. | Jack McGinty | TV film |
| 1983 | Cop Shop | Sergeant Reg Wallis | Episode: 1.485 |
| 1984 | Special Squad | Teddy | Episode 42: "Life After Teddy" |
| 1985 | A Country Practice | Theo Guthrie | 2 episodes: "Swan Song: Parts 1 & 2" |
| 1988 | The Flying Doctors | Angus McGregor | 2 episodes: "Clapped Out", "Valentine's Day" |
| 1993 | Under the Skin | | Anthology series, episode 11: "Old Sam, Jasper and Mr Frank" |
| 1994 | Newlyweds | Archie | Episode: "The Family Portrait" |
| 1999 | Blue Heelers | Les Collister | 2 episodes: "The Angel Cruise", "Be Prepared" |
