= Terry Stapleton =

Australian writer, playwright and actor (1933–1991)

- Stapleton reading over a script for an episode of Ryan, c. 1973.
- Born: 10 July 1933; Victor Harbor, South Australia
- Died: 23 April 1991 (aged 57); Melbourne, Victoria
- Occupations: Writer; Playwright; Actor
- Years active: 1960–1991
- Spouse: Anne Morgan (m. 1966)

Terrence Anthony Stapleton (10 July 1933 – 23 April 1991) was an Australian writer, playwright and actor, best known for writing and producing television drama series for Crawford Productions.

== Early life ==
Stapleton was born on 10 July 1933 in Victor Harbor, South Australia. His father, William Stapleton, and mother Millicent Elizabeth Manderson, had moved to South Australia from Bendigo, Victoria.

== Career ==
=== Acting and emergence as a writer ===
Prior to his work in television, Stapleton worked in a weapons research factory, before completing theatre work in a semi-professional capacity. He worked for the public service as a designer and illustrator until 1960, when he entered acting professionally, appearing in Alan Seymour's play The One Day of the Year, which he would later adapt into the television sitcom The Last of the Australians. During the early 1960s, he often performed with the Adelaide Theatre, the Sheridan Theatre and the Art Studio Players, appearing in plays such as The Night of the Iguana (1964) and A Streetcar Named Desire (1965), winning Best Actor of the Year awards for his performances.

Stapleton began his writing career writing short stories, later becoming an Adelaide-based film and theatre critic for The Bulletin in the mid-1960s. In 1965, Stapleton auditioned to be an actor on the Crawford Productions television drama series Homicide. Dorothy Crawford, sister of Hector, knew that Stapleton's slim stature would make him ineligible to meet the height and weight requirements to become a police officer, so she suggested that Stapleton apply for a writing position on the series instead. Stapleton sent in a sample of his work and was hired as a fulltime writer on the series.

=== Police dramas ===
In 1967, Stapleton created and served as showrunner of the espionage television series Hunter. Though originally unsuccessful owing to the outlandish "James Bond-type" concept, Stapleton reworked the series to incorporate the private life and relationships of the titular character, allowing the series to begin rating well.

In 1971, Stapleton and Ian Jones created the television drama series Matlock Police. This was followed by Ryan in 1973, created with American screenwriter Morton Fine.

=== Situation comedies ===
In 1975, after obtaining permission from friend Alan Seymour to adapt his play The One Day of the Year for television, Stapleton pitched the concept for a situation comedy to Hector Crawford. Crawford liked the idea and funded Stapleton's trip to the United States and England to observe television comedy, particularly that performed in front of live audiences, in those countries. Titled The Last of the Australians, Stapleton decided to explore the "generation gap" between a father and son, rather than their differing views on ANZAC Day as depicted in Seymour's play. Comparisons were drawn between Stapleton's series, the British sitcom Till Death Us Do Part and its American remake All in the Family. However, Stapleton claimed that "our characters are quite different, distinctly Australian, so their attitudes and concerns are completely different". Stapleton was sole writer of the series, owing to a shortage of experienced writers at Crawford Productions. The series was renewed for a third series, however, Crawford decided to end the series, owing to the strain on Stapleton to produce an episode each week.

Following the end of that series, Stapleton attempted to write two further sitcoms. A ninety-minute pilot titled Me & Mr Thorne was broadcast in 1977, but was ultimately not picked up by Australian networks. Stapleton believed this was because the networks considered it "too experimental". Stapleton then went on to write Bobby Dazzler, which ran for one series from 1977 to 1978.

=== Return to dramas and stage plays ===
Stapleton returned to drama in 1977 with the television series Cop Shop. Owing to its success, Stapleton and Jock Blair created the soap opera Skyways, which ran from 1979 to 1981. Stapleton and Vince Moran created Carson's Law in 1983. At the time, it was speculated by the media that Stapleton, who had recently been promoted as a Creative Director of Crawford Productions, had based some characters in the series on the Crawford family. The rumours enabled the series to bolster large audience interest and the series ran until 1984. Following this, Stapleton and Moran created The Flying Doctors in 1986.

In 1985, Stapleton wrote his first stage play, Some Night in Julia Creek, which premiered in Sydney at the Ensemble Theatre in July 1985, to positive reception. His second play, The Last Dance, was performed in January 1986 at the same theatre. His later plays, A Few Good Friends and Say Goodbye, written in 1986 and 1987 respectively, were performed but not published. At the time of his death in Melbourne on 23 April 1991, Stapleton was writing a musical titled Favourite Son with composer David Reeves.

Stapleton has been described as being "one of Australia's most talented and prolific writers of television drama". Writer Patrick Edgeworth said "he turned Crawford Productions into a writing college".

== Awards and nominations ==
Year	Award	Category	Work	Result	Ref
1964	Best Actor of the Year		The Night of the Iguana	Won	
1965	Best Actor of the Year		A Streetcar Named Desire	Won	
1977	Sammy Award	Best Writer for TV Comedy	Bobby Dazzler	Won	
1983	AWGIE	Best Drama Serial Script	Carson's Law	Won	

== Personal life ==
Stapleton married Queensland-born actress Anne Morgan in 1966. They had two daughters.
