= Wedding Day (game show) =

Australian television series

- Genre: Game show
- Country of origin: Australia
- Original language: English

Production
- Production company: Crawford Productions

Original release
- Network: HSV-7
- Release: 1956 – 1957

Wedding Day is one of the earliest Australian television series. It aired from 1956 to 1957 on HSV-7 at 9:30pm for a total of thirty-nine weeks. The programmme was produced by Crawford Productions. It was a game show, in which the contestants were a couple who had just got married. The archival status of the series is not confirmed.

== See also ==
- The Pressure Pak Show
- Give it a Go
- The Dulux Show
