= The Bluestone Boys =

- Written by: Ian Jones; Robert Caswell; Colin Eggleston
- Starring: Garry Meadows; Chuck Faulkner; Eric Oldfield; Denise Drysdale; Brian Blain; George Spartels
- Country of origin: Australia
- Original language: English

Production
- Producer: Jock Blair
- Running time: 23 minutes (26 episodes)

Original release
- Network: The 0-10 Network
- Release: 1976

The Bluestone Boys is a 1976 Australian comedy television series about a fictional prison, produced by Crawford Productions. The program was not particularly successful and was cancelled after a run of 26 episodes. The series starred Garry Meadows and Chuck Faulkner.

== Cast ==
- Garry Meadows as CB
- Chuck Faulkner as Chief Warder Sharpley
- Vic Gordon as Governor Beams
- Carla Hoogeveen
- Eric Oldfield
- Denise Drysdale as Nurse Peachum
- Brian Blain as Claude
- George Spartels
- Bert Newton
- Norman Kaye
- Reg Gorman as Brigsy
- Bob Ruggiero as Detective
- Frank Wilson
- John Cobley
