= Arch Nicholson =

Australian film director

- Born: 1941; Melbourne, Victoria, Australia
- Died: February 1990 (aged 48–49); Australia
- Occupation: Film director

Arch Nicholson (1941 – 24 February 1990) was an Australian film director.

He was born in Melbourne and grew up in Western Australia, originally training to be a teacher. Seeing Last Year at Marienbad made him want to become a filmmaker and he spent 12 years making documentaries at the Commonwealth Film Unit such as The Russians. He then began directing episodes of TV shows such as The Flying Doctors and Special Squad.

Nicholson was married to former Play School presenter Jan Kingsbury.

He died of amyotrophic lateral sclerosis in 1990, aged 48.

== Select Credits ==
- A Good Thing Going (1978) (TV movie)
- Deadline (1982)
- Buddies (1983)
- Fortress (1985)
- Dark Age (1987)
- Weekend with Kate (1990)
