= Paul Cronin =

Australian actor (1938–2019)

- Cronin in The Sullivans as Dave Sullivan
- Born: 8 July 1938; Jamestown, South Australia, Australia
- Died: 13 September 2019 (aged 81); Melbourne, Victoria, Australia
- Occupation: Actor
- Known for: The Sullivans; Matlock Police
- Spouse: Helen Margaret Kinnear (m. 1959; died 2013)
- Children: 4

Paul Cronin (8 July 1938 – 13 September 2019) was an Australian actor, best known for his multiple-award winning role in the Australian television series The Sullivans as patriarch Dave Sullivan. He won the Silver Logie for Best Actor five times, including three years consecutively from 1978, the most awarded actor in Australia, alongside Martin Sacks.

As a young man Cronin moved to Melbourne where he worked in a variety of jobs. After actively seeking an acting career, he performed in various Crawford Productions including Division 4 and Homicide. Cronin appeared as motorcycle policeman Gary Hogan in the Crawford Productions drama Matlock Police (1971–1976), followed by its spin-off Solo One (1976). He played the central character of Dave Sullivan in the popular soap opera The Sullivans from 1976 to 1983.

In 1986 Cronin led a consortium with Christopher Skase which was awarded the inaugural licence for the Brisbane Bears in the then-Victorian Football League. He was president of the club from 1987-1989.

== Biography ==
Cronin was born on 8 July 1938 in Jamestown, South Australia, and grew up in a farming family. After leaving school, Cronin became a farmer himself. He married Helen Kinnear in 1959. The couple had four daughters: twins Katherine and Jane, followed by Susanne and Juliana. Cronin was educated at Rostrevor College.

As an athlete he had participated in the 1958 Commonwealth Games competing in the four x 100m relay. He was a state runner and also a champion gymnast.

Cronin eventually moved to Melbourne where he worked as a truck driver and a draftsman. It was at this time that he acted in various Crawford Productions including Division 4 and Homicide.

His wife Helen Margaret Kinnear died in 2013.

== Career ==
After playing several small roles, in 1971, Cronin appeared as motorcycle policeman Gary Hogan in the Crawford Productions drama Matlock Police (1971–1976). After that series ended he continued the role in the spin-off Solo One (1976), a series continuing Hogan's motorcycle police officer exploits.

After Matlock Police came the central character of Dave Sullivan, a family patriarch in the soap opera The Sullivans. He worked in The Sullivans from 1976 to 1983. The role as Dave Sullivan won him five Silver Logies.

In the 1980s Cronin appeared in a series of television advertisements against drunk driving with a tagline question "Would you let a friend drive home if he's had too much to drink?".

In 1998 Cronin replaced Channel Nine voice-over man Pete Smith as the alternative co-host on radio 3AW's Nightline and Remember When programs.

In 2008, Cronin was the host of the fourth series of Discover Downunder, which explores the caravan and camping industry in Australia. It was first aired on Network Ten, then the Nine Network.

== Other activities ==
Cronin had a strong interest in Australian rules football. In 1986 he led a consortium with Christopher Skase which was awarded the inaugural licence for the Brisbane Bears in the then-Victorian Football League (VFL). The club's creation was a major step in the Victorian league becoming the national Australian Football League. He was president of the club from 1987-1989.

He was a member of the Patrons Council of the Epilepsy Foundation of Victoria.

== Awards ==
He won the Silver Logie for best actor five times, including three years consecutively from 1978, making him the equal most awarded actor in Australia, alongside Martin Sacks. In 1980, he was given the title of the "King of Moomba", a community festival celebrated in Melbourne.

== Select credits ==
Year	Title	Role	Notes
1970	Division 4	Const. Thompson / Constable Pryor / Groomsman / Crime car squad detective / Detective / Constable / Arson squad detective / Const. Baker	8 episodes
1970	Homicide	Const. Parker / Det. Evans / Constable 1	3 episodes
1971-1976	Matlock Police	Sen. Const. Gary Hogan	228 episodes
1976	Solo One	Sen. Const. Gary Hogan	13 episodes
1976-1983	The Sullivans	Dave Sullivan	1077 episodes
1984	Matthew and Son	Matthew Caine	TV movie
1987	A Place to Call Home	Bob Jakes	TV movie
1987	The Daryl Somers Show	Himself	1 episode
1990	The Flying Doctors	Jock Weatherhead	Episode: "A Place Where You Belong"
1990	The Far Country		
1991	Burke's Backyard	Himself - Celebrity Gardener	1 episode
1993	The Late Show	Dave Sullivan	1 episode
1995	Frontline	Lloyd Walsh	Episode: "Give 'em Enough Rope"
1997	State Coroner	Ted Ames	Episode: "Starting with a Bang"(final appearance)
2006	Temptation	Himself	Episode: "Superchallenge: Heat 1"
2008	The Hollowmen	Himself	Episode: "Vulnerable to Attack"
