= Sonja Tallis =

Australian actress, singer and drama teacher

Sonia Tallis
- Born: 23 September 1943 (age 81); Australia
- Occupation(s): Actress, folk singer, teacher

Sonja Tallis (born 24 September 1943) is an Australian former actress, singer and drama teacher.

Tallis began her showbiz career as a folk singer, touring as part of a duo called "Sean & Sonja", before moving onto acting.

She started her acting career in a guest role in television serial The Young Doctors, and then had a small role in Sons and Daughters,

Tallis would then go on to her best-known role, as a recurring character of top dog, Nora Flynn, in Prisoner which she played for six months between May and November 1985. She went on to a regular role in the short-lived Crawford's series Prime Time, as Georgina Jones, in 1986. She appeared in small guest roles in A Country Practice, Home and Away and McLeod's Daughters.

Tallis has taught drama, both privately and in a number of schools in Sydney.

== Filmography ==
Film
Year	Title	Role	Notes
1981	The Killing of Angel Street	Woman Police Officer 1	
1982	The Best of Friends	Pammie	
2010	The Nothing Men	Maggie	

Television
Year	Title	Role	Notes
1981	The Young Doctors	Barbara Webber	Episode 1,019 (guest)
1981	Captives of Care	Patty	ABC TV film
1983	The Disappearance of Azaria Chamberlain	Mrs. Kuhl	TV film
1984	Kindred Spirits	Journalist	ABC TV film
1984	Crime of the Decade	Pamela Brown	ABC TV film
1984	Sons and Daughters	Shirley Ryan	Season 3 (recurring, 5 episodes)
1984	Sweet and Sour	Saleslady	Season 1, episode 17 (guest)
1985	Prisoner	Nora Flynn	Season 7 (supporting, 52 episodes)
1986	Prime Time	Georgina Jones	Season 1 (unknown episodes)
1987	A Country Practice	Heather Gordon	Season 7, episodes 69 & 70 (guest)
1988	Rafferty's Rules	Sally Manning	Season 4, episode 8 (guest)
1989	E Street	Lyn Agostini	Season 1, episodes 21 & 22 (guest)
2000	Home and Away	Margaret Bradley	Season 13, episodes 89 & 90 (guest)
2005	McLeod's Daughters	Alessa Manfredi	Season 5, episode 19 (guest)

Other appearances
Year	Title	Role	Notes
1965	Bandstand	Guest - Herself as Singer/Performer	TV series, 1 episode
1986	Hey Hey It's Saturday	Guest - Herself (Red Faces)	TV series, 1 episode
1989	In Melbourne Today	Guest - Herself	TV series, 1 episode
1998	Denise	Guest - Herself	TV series, 1 episode
