= Valma Howell =

Australian artist (1896–1979)

- Born: Valma Odine Howell; 15 June 1896; Beaufort, Victoria, Australia
- Died: 16 December 1979 (aged 83)
- Occupations: Artist, actress
- Partner: Joff Ellen
- Relatives: Charles Swanston (great-grandfather); Ada Verdun Howell (sister)

Valma Ondine Howell (15 June 1896 – 16 December 1979), was an Australian artist and actor.

== Early years ==
Valma Ondine Howell was born in Beaufort, where she was to spend most of her life. The first 14 years of her life were spent with her family on her father's sheep grazing property 'Dookerimbut' between Beaufort and Skipton in western Victoria. She did not board at Ruyton Girls' school in Melbourne during the 1910s. During the Depression she worked as a housekeeper at Mooramong sheep station near Skipton. It was here she later befriended the Canadian-born Hollywood silent screen star Claire Adams, wife of D.J.S. (Scobie) Mackinnon, then chairman of the Victoria Racing Club (VRC).

== Career ==
Valma Ondine Howell's most famous subjects include the Fiery Creek catchment and the Yalla-Y-Poora property. Her one known film role is in the film Night Club (1952); one of only a handful of films made in Melbourne in that decade.

Her sister, the poet and author Ada Verdun Howell, lived with her for many years on Stockyard Hill Rd, where they maintained a bush block famous for its kangaroo grass woodland.

== Personal life ==
She was the great-granddaughter of Captain Charles Swanston, East India Company employee and Port Phillip Association investor. She was briefly engaged to fellow actor/entertainer Joff Ellen. She died following a car accident in 1979.

== Additional References ==
- Of Sheep and Men: a History of Skipton by Notman, G. Claude. Skipton, Victoria Claude Notman, 1981
- History of Ruyton 1878–1956, Daniell, Hilda. Ramsay, Ware Publishing, Melbourne 1956.
