= Bobby Dazzler =

- Genre: Sitcom
- Written by: Terry Stapleton
- Directed by: Ian Crawford; Marie Trevor
- Starring: John Farnham; Olivia Hamnett; Maurie Fields
- Theme music composer: Wayne Robinson
- Country of origin: Australia
- Original language: English
- No. of series: 1
- No. of episodes: 14

Production
- Executive producers: Ian Crawford; Ian Jones
- Producer: Hector Crawford
- Camera setup: Multi-camera
- Running time: 25 minutes
- Production company: Crawford Productions

Original release
- Network: Seven Network
- Release: 20 November 1977 – 3 March 1978

Bobby Dazzler is an Australian television sitcom produced by Crawford Productions, starring pop singer John Farnham as the title character, up-and-coming pop music star Bobby Farrell. The other regular cast members were Maurie Fields as Bobby's father Fred, an old vaudeville performer; and Olivia Hamnett as Bobby's officious manager, Della McDermott. It was aired on the Seven Network during the summer of 1977–78.

== Cast ==
=== Main ===
- John Farnham as Bobby Farrell
- Maurie Fields as Fred Farrell
- Olivia Hamnett as Della McDermott

=== Regulars/guests ===
- Terry Norris as Uncle Oz
- Carla Hoogeveen as Allison
- George Spartels as George
- Shane Porteous as Sergio
- Ernie Bourne as Seymour
- Andrew Sharp as Brook Carter
- Gabrielle Hartley as Katherine Carr
- Roy Day as Carstairs / MC
- Rowena Wallace as Ruth Rierdom
- Sigrid Thornton as Anastasia
- Sheila Florance as Mrs Jollie
- Andrew McKaige as Studio Assistant
- Gwen Plumb as Dinner Guest 1
- Lucky Grills as Himself
- Garry Meadows as Himself

== Etymology ==
The English word bobby-dazzler was originally a Yorkshire and Lancashire dialect term for a person who is considered (with affection) remarkable or excellent, shows smart dress sense or is maybe "flashy".

== See also ==
- List of Australian television series
- List of programs broadcast by Seven Network
