= Take That (TV series) =

Australian television series

- Genre: Sitcom
- Inspired by: Yes, What? by Rex Dawe Whack-O! by: Frank Muir; Denis Norden
- Starring: Phillip Stainton; Irene Hewitt; Frank Rich; Keith Eden; Joff Ellen
- Country of origin: Australia
- Original language: English

Production
- Production locations: South Melbourne, Victoria
- Running time: 15 minutes
- Production company: Crawford Productions

Original release
- Network: HSV-7
- Release: 1957 – March 1959

Take That was one of the earliest Australian television series. It debuted in late 1957 and ran till March 1959. As was often the case with early Australian television, it aired only on a single station, in this case HSV-7, in Melbourne.

== Program synopsis and significance ==
Take That was a slapstick comedy series set in an unruly schoolroom; one of the earliest such series produced for Australian television, and is sometimes considered to be Australia's first, regularly scheduled sitcom.

The series was produced by Crawford Productions, who made several other pioneering 1950s series, like the game show Wedding Day and the children's show Peters Club (also featuring Joff Ellen), at the Channel 7 studios in Dorcas Street, South Melbourne, before live audiences.

The program, inspired by a popular radio show and the BBC's Whack-O!, was notable for its unpredictable stunts and pranks featuring noisy sound effects, onstage smokebombs and fireworks.

== Cast ==
Cast included the portly British comic actor Philip Stainton as the schoolmaster, and naughty local students Irene Hewitt, Frank Rich, Keith Eden, and Joff Ellen.

The archival status of the show (which was broadcast live) is not clear; although Kinescope recording existed, many early Australian broadcasts of the period were not recorded. Former Crawfords' staffer Ian Crawford has said that the program was kinescoped, but that no footage survives.

== Scheduling ==
For some time the series aired in a 15-minute time-slot 7:00 p.m. on Wednesday, was preceded by a brief newscast and followed by another 15-minute series titled Teenage Mailbag at 7:15 p.m., itself followed at 8:00 p.m. by an American program (The Adventures of Rin Tin Tin). At some point in 1959, the series aired on Saturday at 5:30 p.m., preceded by These Were Hits (consisting of clips from the series Hit Parade) and followed at 5:45 p.m. by Cavalcade of Sport.

== See also ==
- Barley Charlie – 1964 Australian sitcom
- The Passionate Pianist – 1957 one-off comedy play which aired on ABC
