= Ada Verdun Howell =

Australian poet

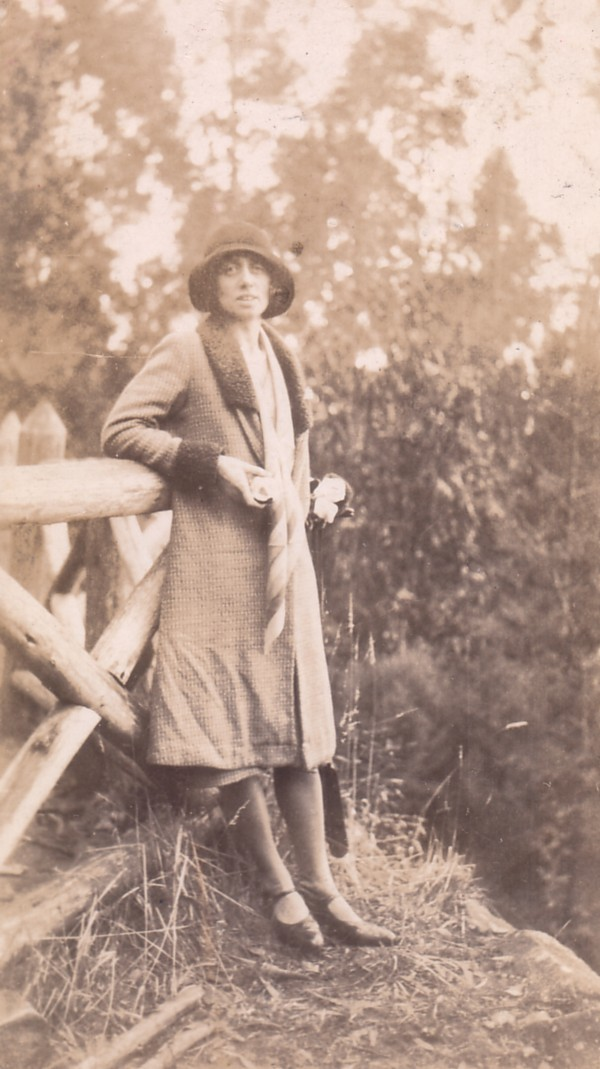
- Born: 19 July 1902; Beaufort, Victoria, Australia
- Died: 1981 (aged 78–79); New York, United States
- Occupation: Writer
- Relatives: Valma Howell (sister)

Ada Verdun Howell (19 July 1902 – 1981) was an Australian writer and poet. She was born in Beaufort, Victoria, on her father's sheep property. Her sister was the artist Valma Howell. She lived in New York in the latter part of her life where she wrote most of her most famous works. She is best known for her later writing, much praised for its great formal and feminine qualities, as an early sound poet.

Her most influential works include the strangely disquieting Monmot and the later Exit Strategies.

The last part of her life was apparently spent in much economic hardship and she died virtually unknown in her own country.

== New York life ==
By the time she was in her late thirties Ada had abandoned Melbourne, where she was surrounded by what she felt were stuffy and provincial relations, for New York and the bohemian life, where she was soon surrounded by an artistic life and freedom she was unable to experience in Australia. Her first husband, Adrian Morten, an undistinguished writer and critic, by whom she had her two children, does not appear to have been very supportive. The marriage, like most of Ada's later relationships, floated on a tide of drink and was marked by spectacular rows. After Morten's sudden death she consoled herself with many lovers; "once I got Mr Morten out of my life I felt like a new woman," she told a close friend Harold Norse. In her forties she stumbled into her métier, modern poetry.

In the early 1940s she was taken under the wing of Peggy Guggenheim who was to provide both financial and intellectual encouragement. In the decades that followed she became a close friend to poet and Beat Harold Norse. Her last years were a slow decline due to alcoholism. Little is known of her last years and she died of unknown causes in 1981.

== Juvenilia ==
Her earliest work Poems is not considered to be of much literary value, however it does display an affection for the sound of words and an awareness of other languages other than English. An example is the poem A single body of water:

In the dim light of the crescent moon,
I strode the high hills of Ercildoune.
Through the lakes and the waters' song
Soft words they whispered 'Buninyong'

== Early work ==
Her professional career begins with Anamorphosis where she goes beyond the exterior world of landscape and the body and she begins to explore the interior universe of love and selfhood.

The poem Unlanguid longueurs exhibits a new awareness of the world around her:

All the same, my desire had taught me
An object lesson.
He was a sceptic, I was an enthusiast.
He analysed, I synthesized.
He dealt with proofs, I with questions of faith.
He was, in short,
An historian.
I couldn't help being
A pilgrim;
But I knew now I must be
As dispassionate pilgrim
As possible.

== Concrete poetry ==
Her best known work is the controversial Exit Strategies. This prose/poem cycle was praised by E. E. Cummings as "poetry as pure energy...just in time for atomic age", but similarly condemned by others for the same qualities.

The famous 400 stanza, Eanie Meanie poem:

Eanie Meanie Minie Meanie
Mo Mo Moonie Minie
Eanie Moonie Moonie Meanie
Oonie Eanie Moonie Me
....

has few antecedents in the English language: language was to her pure sound, its meaning lost in our collective past

== Bibliography ==
- Poems. by A.V. Howell; Melbourne : Massina, 1931.
- Anamorphosis. by A.V. Howell; Melbourne : Massina, 1937
- Monmot. by A.Verdun Howell; Mooramong Press 1938, Ballarat.
- Exit Strategies. by A.Verdun Howell; A.V.Howell, New York City 1950
- A Dialogue on Our Obscurity. by A.Verdun Howell in Avalanche 2 (Winter) 1970

== Sources ==
- Of Sheep and Men: a History of Skipton. by Notman, G.Claude. Skipton, Victoria Claude Notman, 1981
- Modern poets on modern poetry: edited by James Scully. London : Fontana/Collins, 1966.
- Tyers and text:an analysis of the early poetry of A.Verdon Howell and the journals of Charles Tyers. by Murray S.Gavin Victorian Historical Journal 1985 54(2):p34-41
- Memoirs of a bastard angel. by Harold Norse. New York : Morrow, 1989.
