= Peters Club =

- Genre: Children's television
- Presented by: Rod McLennan; Judy Banks; Joff Ellen
- Country of origin: Australia
- Original language: English

Production
- Production company: Crawford Productions.

Original release
- Network: GTV-9
- Release: 1958 – 1959

Peters Club is an Australian children's television series which reportedly debuted in 1958, and aired on GTV-9, running into 1959. At the time, many Australian television programmes were only broadcast on a single station instead of being networked, which may have also been the case with the series.

Cast included Rod McLennan, Judy Banks and the comedian Joff Ellen, who was concurrently playing a schoolboy on the early sitcom Take That.

There is very little information available on this show but it is known that the now-defunct Truth newspaper gave it an award for "Best Children's Show - Melbourne Television". Notably, it was produced by Crawford Productions.

The title, without a possessive apostrophe, referenced the sponsor - Peters Ice Cream (which also used the TV clowns Zig and Zag, who wore ice cream cone hats on HSV-7). As was the case with 1950s American television series, early Australian television series sometimes featured the name of the sponsor in the title. Other examples included The Dulux Show, Tarax Show, Shell Presents, Swallows Parade, The Astor Show, among others.

There is no information available as to whether any episodes exist as kinescope recordings, the method used to record live television in Australia prior to the introduction of videotape, as many live broadcasts of the era were not recorded.
