= A Place to Call Home (1987 film) =

- Promotional advertisement
- Genre: Drama
- Written by: Jeri Taylor
- Screenplay by: Carol Sobieski
- Story by: Carol Sobieski
- Directed by: Russ Mayberry
- Starring: Linda Lavin; Lane Smith; Lori Loughlin; Paul Cronin
- Theme music composer: Fred Karlin
- Countries of origin: Australia; United States
- Original language: English

Production
- Executive producers: Virginia L. Carter; Linda Lavin; Marty Litke
- Producers: Mike Lake; Ross Matthews
- Cinematography: Ron Hagen
- Editor: Corky Ehlers
- Running time: 96 min.
- Production company: Embassy Television
- Budget: $4 million

Original release
- Network: CBS
- Release: 7 February 1987

A Place to Call Home is a 1987 television film about Liz Gavin and her eleven children, who relocate from Houston, Texas, to Australia.
