= J. M. Rohan =

John Murray "Jack" Rohan (c. 1889 – 12 February 1960) was an Australian sporting journalist.

== History ==
Rohan was born in Richmond, Victoria, son of Johanna Rohan and (police) Sergeant Martin Rohan (c. 1858 – 14 June 1945) of Wangaratta, previously of Benalla.

He enlisted with the First AIF in May 1915 and left Australia with the 10th Australian Field Ambulance. In December 1917 after a year's service in Australia and a year overseas he received a commission as cadet officer, with the rank of sergeant. He was transferred to the 13th Battalion, later with the 34th Battalion. In August 1918, 2nd Lieutenant Rohan was wounded in action in Rouen France, receiving a gunshot wound to his left forearm. During the war he was a guest of the Earl and Countess of Strathmore and their daughter Lady Elizabeth Bowes Lyon, later Queen Elizabeth the Queen Mother, at Glamis Castle, Scotland. He was an organiser of boxing and wrestling matches in the military camps in Australia and in England and France, as well as on the troop ships. After the armistice he was associated with Colonel C. V. Watson in organising A.I.F. sports in London. and was involved in formation of the famous A.I.F. cricket team, which included H. L. Collins, J. M. Gregory, W. A. Oldfield. A. W. Lampard and C. B. Willis, was formed. He was awarded the Military Cross in 1919 and repatriated to Australia.

=== Sporting ===
While in officer training at Cambridge during the war he rowed for Emmanuel College and represented Bainbridge at Rugby against New Zealanders, Oxford and other teams. He was an enthusiast for Australian rules football, becoming a supporter of the South Melbourne Football Club in 1904 end elected to the committee in 1928. He served as president during the years 1929–1932, remaining on the administration as vice-president and life member. He was a member of the Commercial Travellers' Association and the Victorian Club, and for some years president of the Victorian Anglers' Club.

=== Journalism ===
On 12 March 1934 Rohan joined the staff of The Sporting Globe, succeeding W. S. Sharland, the two men sharing a passion for Australian rules football. He became a well-known figure in Melbourne sporting circles, his stories and reports in the Saturday and Wednesday issues being read in the country and the city. He was also editor of the popular feature "Here, There, and Everywhere" in the Sun News-Pictorial.

=== Fundraising ===
Rohan was noted for his expertise and enthusiasm for charity fundraising. During the Second World War he ran thousands of sessions with Walter Lindrum for patriotic funds and charities, raising over £60,000. He inaugurated Lindrum's "round the clock" exhibitions and accompanied Lindrum in his tour of Army, Navy, and Air Force camps and depots. His "Fags for Fighters" appeal raised £5000 for soldiers' comforts, and he collected over £5000 for Lady Brooks' Women's Hostel and WAAAF appeals. In a tour around Geelong, Colac, Hamilton and Warrnambool, £2000 was collected for the Totally Blinded Soldiers' appeal. Rohan was a committee member of 3DB – Sporting Globe Good Friday Appeal, which raised money for the Children's Hospital. He worked on the Partially Blinded Soldiers' Appeal, Limbless Soldiers' Appeal and Gladys Moncrieff Matinee Committee, which raised respectively £11,300 and £18,700. Sir Thomas Nettlefold called him one of the best organisers and money getters in Australia.

== Family ==
Rohan married Annie Josephine Evans on 25 September 1915. Their children include:

- Molly Irene Rohan (1916–2013) married James Joseph Tevlin
- Shirley June Rohan ( – ) married Leon Edward Russell Pullen (1930–2015)

Edward Rohan, of Carlton and United Breweries, was a brother.
