= Peter Evans (radio personality) =

Australian radio personality

Peter Evans (1927–1985) was a breakfast radio announcer on the Australian Broadcasting Commission's station 3LO (now 774 ABC Melbourne). Prior to this, he had been a broadcaster at Melbourne commercial radio station 3XY. His ABC program ran for over two decades from 1965 until 1985 and for much of that period was the highest rating breakfast radio program in Melbourne. The radio show was also relayed and aired through ABC Radio in Brisbane Queensland.

Evans was renowned for his eccentricities and often came across as a bitter and grumpy man, seemingly detached from the present and displaying a greater fondness for the bygone era of the British Empire than for the country he had resided in for the majority of his life.

He repeatedly broke traditional broadcasting guidelines by such acts as allowing periods of several seconds of silence to be broadcast.

Coming from a Welsh background and bearing the common Welsh surname "Evans", he often referred to himself in the traditional Welsh form of "Evans the Wireless", whereby a person's occupation was used as part of their identifier.

The breakfast show was introduced by a fast-paced and witty instrumental tune called "Gentleman Jim", which was composed and conducted by Bert Kaempfert & his Orchestra, released in 1963. At the closing of the breakfast show Evans would again play "Gentleman Jim" as the show's theme, but usually he made a few satirical comments enticing the radio audience to tune in again tomorrow.
