= Fortress (1985 film) =

- Theatrical release poster
- Directed by: Arch Nicholson
- Screenplay by: Everett De Roche
- Based on: Fortress by Gabrielle Lord
- Produced by: Raymond Menmuir
- Starring: Rachel Ward
- Cinematography: David Connell
- Edited by: Ralph Strasser
- Music by: Danny Beckerman
- Production companies: Crawford Productions; HBO Premiere Films
- Distributed by: United International Pictures (Australia and New Zealand); HBO (United States)
- Release dates: 24 November 1985 (US, TV premiere); 26 June 1986 (Australia)
- Running time: 91 minutes
- Countries: Australia; United States
- Language: English
- Budget: A$4.4 million
- Box office: A$139,000

Fortress is a 1985 Australian thriller film directed by Arch Nicholson and written by Everett De Roche, and starring Rachel Ward, based on Gabrielle Lord's 1980 novel of the same name.

== Plot ==
Sally Jones is the sole teacher of a one-room school in the Outback, where she has nine pupils ranging in age from six to sixteen. One ordinary day, the younger children claim to have seen cartoon characters on the edges of the school playground. Sally dismisses this as fantasy, until four armed men wearing Halloween masks enter the school, led by a man Sally calls "Father Christmas" due to his Father Christmas mask. The men force Sally and the children into a van. Sally orders the children to gather their knapsacks and lunches and comply with the men.

In the van, Sally and the older students overhear the men discussing holding the school for ransom, threatening to murder one child a day until their demands are met. Pretending innocence, Sally asks the kidnappers to stop for a rest break, while secretly ordering one of the children to hide in the woods and go for help. The kidnappers immediately realize one of their victims has gone missing and threaten to shoot one of the other children, forcing Sally to call the boy back.

Sally and the children are barricaded inside a cave. One of the children recognizes the cave as one he used to explore with his cousins and indicates there may be an alternate exit. Sally and some of the older children explore the cave, discovering the exit across an underground river. The older children and Sally help the younger children across this river to the outside. The group comes across a farmhouse occupied by an old man and his wife. However, the kidnappers have reached the farmhouse first. When the old man puts up a struggle, the kidnappers shoot him and his wife. Another kidnapper, objecting to the murder, is killed by Father Christmas.

Sally and the children are locked into the barn along with an armed kidnapper while the other kidnappers go on a supply run. Sally concocts a plan for the oldest schoolgirl, Narelle, to distract the kidnapper by flirting with him while another boy steals his shotgun. The plan is successful and the kidnapper is killed, but the boy is badly injured by a stray shotgun blast.

The children and their teacher flee into the Outback. Now realizing that passivity will not save them, they decide to fight back. Discovering a cave, they proceed to fortify it, using lessons they learned in class about the hunting methods of indigenous Australians to build a pit with sharpened spikes and using their school supplies to make spears. One of the kidnappers is killed in the spike pit, but Father Christmas makes it to the cave, where he is attacked by Sally and the children.

Several months later, police investigators visit the school to speak to Sally about the condition of the body of Father Christmas. Sally claims no knowledge, insisting that she and the children rolled a large boulder onto him that killed him instantly. The investigators are unnerved by the presence of the children, who suddenly surround them. The investigators leave without further questions. Sally regards the preserved human heart on display among the school's science experiments, then, satisfied, dismisses the children for the day.

== Cast ==
- Rachel Ward as Sally Jones
- Sean Garlick as Sid O'Brien
- Rebecca Rigg as Narelle
- Robin Mason as Derek
- Marc Aden Gray as Tommy O'Brien
- Beth Buchanan as Leanne
- Asher Keddie as Sue
- Bradley Meehan as Richard
- Anna Crawford as Sarah
- Richard Terrill as Toby
- Peter Hehir as Jim "Father Christmas"
- David Bradshaw as "Pussy Cat"
- Vernon Wells as "Dabby Duck"
- Roger Stephen as "Mac The Mouse"
- Wendy Playfair as Old Woman
- Ed Turley as Old Man
- Elaine Cusick as Mrs. O'Brien
- Laurie Moran as Mr. O'Brien
- Nick Waters as Detective Sergeant Cotter
- Terence Donovan as Detective Sergeant Mitchell
- Ray Chubb as Publican

== Production ==
The novel Fortress by Gabrielle Lord was inspired by the 1972 Faraday School kidnapping of an isolated rural single teacher school and was influenced by William Golding's 1954 novel Lord of the Flies. At one stage it was thought the novel would be filmed by Rupert Murdoch and Robert Stigwood's Associated R&R Films as a follow-up to Gallipoli (1981). However, this never happened. The film rights were purchased by Crawford Productions, who intended to make a feature film for local release and a telemovie for HBO in the US. Half the budget was from HBO, who insisted the lead be played by an actress who was familiar to the American public.

Everett De Roche wrote the script and originally Bruce Beresford was announced as director. He dropped out and then Arch Nicholson was hired. Crawford and HBO wanted Bess Armstrong to play the lead. Actors Equity objected, so Sigrid Thornton was accepted as a compromise. However, two months prior to shooting Thornton became pregnant and HBO and Crawford insisted on Armstrong. Actors Equity would not relent and the film shut down, despite the fact $700,000 had already been spent. The project was later re-activated when Rachel Ward (a British actress who had moved to Australia) was approved. The film was then shot in Australia during 1985 over 12 5-day weeks at Hillside. The school they used in the film was the Rosehill primary school, near Bairnsdale, East Gippsland and in the Grampians.

== Release ==
The film was initially released directly to cable television by the HBO channel in the United States on 24 November 1985. It contains scenes of graphic violence unusual for TV productions of the time. It was released to cinemas in Australia on 26 June 1986.

It won the American Cinema Editors for direction of Photography in 1986.
