= Ray Chapman (broadcaster and philatelist) =

Australian philatelist

Raymond Thomas Chapman is an Australian philatelist who was added to the Roll of Distinguished Philatelists in 1987. Chapman was noted for his extensive collection of Australian colonial stamps.

He was made a Member of the Order of the British Empire in 1976 and a Member of the Order of Australia in 1994.

Chapman had a long career in broadcasting, firstly at 3XY which he joined in 1943, and then as an announcer at 3AW for many years; he was later in charge of 3AW's Royal Women's Hospital appeal.
