= Meet Me at Bebarfalds =

- Genre: Talk show
- Presented by: Chuck Faulkner
- Country of origin: Australia
- Original language: English

Original release
- Network: TCN-9
- Release: 1958 – 1959

Meet Me at Bebarfalds is an Australian television series which aired 1958 to 1959 on Sydney station TCN-9. Hosted by Chuck Faulkner, the series was broadcast from now-defunct retail store Bebarfalds. It aired at 2:00PM. An article in the Sydney Morning Herald, while not mentioning the series by name, described the format as including shoppers being asked topical questions, along with game show segments and a celebrity guest. Like most early Australian series, it aired in a single city only.
