= Greek Tragedy (play) =

Greek Tragedy is a 1989 play by British playwright Mike Leigh, about the troubled relationship of a Greek couple Alex and Calliope. It received a revival in 2003, which was directed by Evdokia Katahanas, an actor who appeared in the original.

== History ==
The play was originally presented at Company B Belvoir Street Theatre, Sydney Australia. It was devised by Mike Leigh with six Australian actors. They were Zoe Carides, Khristina Totos, Stan Kouros, George Spartels, Evodkia Katahanas and Nicholas Papademetriou.

The production was a landmark production for Company B as it is the only play to be devised by Mike Leigh in Australia. It was one of the biggest successes of the theatre year and was subsequently invited to do seasons at the Edinburgh Festival and London's Theatre Royal Stratford East in 1990.

== Original cast ==
- Zoe Carides
- Khristina Totos
- Stan Kouros
- George Spartels
- Evodkia Katahanas
- Nicholas Papademetriou
