= John O'Donnell (radio personality) =

Australian radio personality

- Occupation: Radio personality

John O'Donnell was born on 4 February 1947 in Warrnambool, Victoria.

== Radio career ==
John's career in radio started in Warrnambool at 3YB and since then has worked at 7HO, 4IP, 7EX, 6PR, 2HD, 3XY, 2SM, 3DB, 3UZ, 2Day FM, New FM, 3MP, Magic 693, and Hope 1032 fm Sydney previously known as 2CBA.

== Music director/program director ==
He did programming for 3XY Melbourne 1972–75, he did programming 2SM Sydney during 1976–77, and he did programming 3UZ Melbourne during 1984–85.

In 1993 Management of Easy Music 3MP created a sister radio station to complement 3MP and called it Magic 693, designed to attract an older demographic. O'Donnell was made Program Manager of this new radio station programming music from the 1940s to the 1960s. At the time 3MP was the number one station in Melbourne appealing to 40- to 54-year-olds.

O'Donnell programmed Sydney's Christian Music Station Hope 1032 from 2000 to 2014 and Inspire Digital Sydney's Digital Christian Station from 2010 to 2014.
