= Wallace Sharland =

Australian rules footballer, journalist and commentator

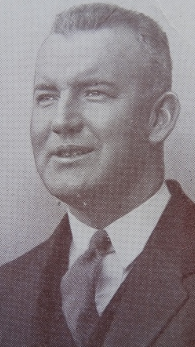

Personal information
- Full name: Wallace Sutherland Sharland
- Nickname: Jumbo
- Born: 11 October 1902; Geelong, Victoria
- Died: 17 September 1967 (aged 64); Richmond, Victoria
- Original team: Newtown
- Height: 191 cm (6 ft 3 in)
- Weight: 83 kg (183 lb)
- Position: Ruckman

Playing career^{1}
Years	Club	Games (Goals)
1920–1925	Geelong	49 (41)

Representative team honours
Years	Team	Games (Goals)
1921–1923	Victoria	4
- ^{1} Playing statistics correct to the end of 1925.

Wallace Sutherland Sharland (11 October 1902 – 17 September 1967) was an Australian rules football player, journalist and commentator. He played with Geelong in the Victorian Football League (VFL).

Sharland, who was commonly known by his nickname '"Jumbo", was recruited from Newtown.

== Geelong years ==
Sharland was an accomplished ruckman for Geelong, known for his good all-round skills, accurate palming of the ball and capability when required as a ruck shepherd. He debuted for Geelong aged 17 in the 1920 VFL season and in the same year joined the staff of the Geelong Advertiser.

His skills as a cricketer came into attention on 29 January 1921 when he scored a century against England's touring Marylebone Cricket Club (MCC). Playing for Geelong, Sharland scored 102 runs out of Geelong's total of 261 in their tour match at Corio Oval. His innings, which was scored as an 18-year-old, earned praise from opponent Jack Hobbs who stated that Sharland "is a hard man to get out" and "is developing on the right lines". He was awarded an inscribed bat from the Mayor of Geelong to commemorate his achievement. The Age wrote an article stating that despite his young age Sharland could justifiably be selected in the Victorian side which were due to play the MCC on 4 February. He however did not make the team and instead it was as a football personality that he made his name.

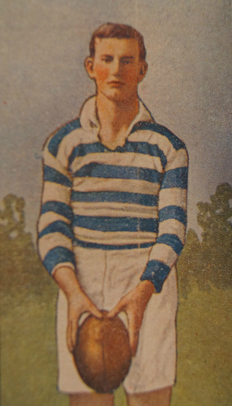
Sharland in Geelong colours

After making five appearances in his first VFL season, Sharland received more opportunities in 1921, with 13 games for Geelong. He made enough of an impression to be in the first-ruck in the Victorian state side which went to Adelaide in August to defeat South Australia and also feature in the return leg at the Melbourne Cricket Ground (MCG). In September 1921 he played his first final, which was a semi-final fixture against Richmond at the Melbourne Cricket Ground. Richmond won by 61-points to end Geelong's season. He played a further eight games with Geelong in the 1922 VFL season.

Sharland made his intentions known before the beginning of the 1923 season that he was seeking to join a Melbourne-based club. He had moved to the city and been employed for the upcoming season as a writer for the Herald and The Sporting Globe. His playing future was not decided until July, by which time he had fallen foul of the Geelong committee. The committee had been initially aggrieved by that fact he pulled out of a game against Essendon claiming to have a sore heel, but was able to represent Victoria against New South Wales a week later. When it was revealed that Sharland had trained at Richmond without permission, the week before he took the field for Geelong against that same team, the Geelong committee debarred him from the club. Unable to play in the VFL without a clearance, Sharland was forced to play in the Mornington Peninsula league with Frankston, where he was residing.

Further attempts were made by Richmond in 1924 to acquire Sharland, but Geelong continued to refuse his clearance. As a result, he made a decision to commit to Geelong for the season and was in the side from round two. Sharland, who was also given the vice-captaincy, finished the season with a career high 15 appearances. Although not selected as a player, Sharland got to attend the 1924 Hobart Carnival as a special correspondent for The Sporting Globe.

For the 1925 VFL season, Sharland's last at Geelong, he was again appointed vice-captain. A wrist injury which he sustained early in the season restricted him to just four games and cost him a place in Geelong's breakthrough 1925 premiership team. He instead covered the finals series as a radio commentator, on ABC station 3AR. In doing so he created history as the first radio commentator to broadcast a VFL game. He broadcast the grand final from the back of the MCG's Grey Smith Stand and later recalled: "There was no sound-proof box and the sound accompaniment was pretty fierce when the excitement rose".

== Later broadcasting career ==
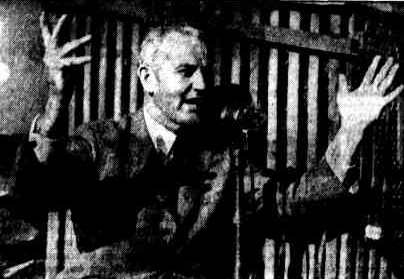
Wallace Sharland during a broadcast

Sharland continued as a journalist and commentator after ending his VFL career. In 1933 he left The Sporting Globe to concentrate on wireless broadcasting for the ABC and later 3XY. He is recognised as a pioneer football commentator on radio. His successor at the Sporting Globe was J. M. Rohan.

== How did Preston Football Club become known as the "Bullants"? ==
It is believed that Victorian Football Association club Preston became known as the Bullants after Sharland referred to the club's players during commentary as a "group of busy bullants". The quote was based on the Preston players being small in stature and the fact they wore a red uniform.

== Personal life ==
Born in Geelong, Victoria on 11 October 1902, he was the son of James Sutherland Sharland, an engineer, and Jane Armstrong Sharland (née Little). He had one elder brother, James Leonard Woodrofe, and two sisters, Dorothy and Jean.

In 1910, Sharland joined his brother at Geelong College. He made the cricket team's 1st XI at the age of 13 and later in 1918 began playing in the firsts for the football team as well.

He got married in 1934 to Ada Moore, in a ceremony in East Malvern. Ada died in 1949.

During World War II Sharland served in the Middle East and Pacific.

On 17 September 1967, Sharland died in Bethesda Hospital at the age of 64.
