= The Last of the Australians =

- Genre: Comedy
- Based on: The One Day of the Year by Alan Seymour
- Written by: Terry Stapleton; Jim Stapleton
- Directed by: Ian Crawford; Marie Trevor; John Domett; Terry Stapleton
- Country of origin: Australia
- Original language: English
- No. of seasons: 2
- No. of episodes: 26

Production
- Executive producer: Ian Crawford
- Producer: Terry Stapleton
- Running time: 30 minutes
- Production company: Crawford Productions

Original release
- Network: Nine Network
- Release: 6 April 1975 – 21 January 1976

The Last of the Australians is an Australian sitcom that was broadcast on the Nine Network in 1975 and 1976. The show is about an irascible father and his frustrations with everyday life.

The comedy series was produced by Crawford Productions in two series of 13 episodes each. It was ostensibly based on Alan Seymour's play The One Day of the Year, albeit with only a superficial similarity to the earlier work. The character of Alf was renamed 'Ted' for the show (use of the original name would have drawn comparisons with Alf Garnett who was a popular and famous character at the time) and the character of Hughie was renamed 'Gary'. 'Jan', played by Noelene Brown in one episode, is unconnected to the character of the same name in the original play. The original play is set in Sydney, but like most Crawfords shows the series is set in Melbourne and Ted's support of Collingwood is a major aspect of the show.

Richard Hibbard left the show after the first series when he became a Hare Krishna devotee. He was replaced by Stephen Thomas.

== Cast ==
=== Main/regular ===
- Alwyn Kurts as Ted Cook
- Richard Hibbard as Gary Cook (episodes 1-13)
- Stephen Thomas as Gary Cook (episodes 14-26)
- Rosie Sturgess as Dot Cook
- Terry Norris as Blue Dawson
- Maurie Fields as Barney

=== Guests ===
- Ben Gabriel as Arnold Harris
- Bob Hawke as Self
- Jacki Weaver as Gillie / Sandy
- John Ewart as Fred
- John Farnham as Salesman
- Jon Finlayson as Mr Flannagan
- Lesley Baker as Ms Ferguson
- Lyndel Rowe as Maria Agostini
- Noeline Brown as Jan
- Noni Hazlehurst as Joanna
- Olivia Hamnett as Receptionist
- Terence Donovan as Mr Walker
- Keith Eden as Mr. King
- Vanessa Leigh as Sandy

== DVD release ==
The complete series was released on DVD in March 2018.

== See also ==
- List of Nine Network programs
- List of Australian television series
