= Ivan Gaal =

Australian filmmaker (1938–2025)

Ivan Gaal (23 March 1938 – 23 September 2025) was an Australian filmmaker. He primarily made documentary films. He also worked as a professional photographer, and also gained recognition as an Olympic standard canoeist.

== Early life and career ==
Gaal was born in Budapest, Hungary on 23 March 1938, and was educated in the Communist system until his departure to Australia at the age of 18. At his school in Budapest, the historic Toldy Ferenc Gymnásium, he excelled in the sport of Olympic wrestling and was the junior champion of Budapest in 1954. He also excelled in canoeing.

He emigrated to Australia as a refugee in 1957, following the Hungarian Revolution of 1956. After staying 6 months in the migrant camp in Bonegilla in Victoria, he settled in Melbourne, and won the Australian Canoe Championship (held by the Australian Canoe Federation, now Paddle Australia) in the Canadian Pairs class in 1960, which led to his selection to the Australian canoeing team for the Rome Olympics in 1960. Due to a lack of funds, he was unable to attend the games.

Gaal worked for the Australian Broadcasting Commission from 1959 to 1969 as an audio technician, and then worked for the Department of Education Victoria from 1970 in the Audio-Visual Education Centre (AVEC) film unit, where he stayed for almost 30 years, directing various docu-drama and documentary films. At the same time, he made independently-produced films, with government grants. He also completed the Graduate Diploma in Applied Film and Television from the Swinburne Film and Television School (now Victorian College of the Arts) in 1978.

He was involved in many organisations over the years, including the Melbourne Filmmakers' Co-Op, the Pram Factory, the Australian Teachers of Media, where he was a judge on the ATOM Awards from 2007-2008, Metro Magazine and the Yarra Ranges Film Society, where he was a judge (from 2005 to 2024) of the "Show Us Your Shorts" program at the Warburton Film Festival. He was interviewed regarding his involvement in the Melbourne Filmmakers' Co-Op in the 2022 documentary film Senses of Cinema, which premiered at the 70th Melbourne International Film Festival, and was broadcast on SBS in 2024.

While working as a filmmaker, Gaal also worked in still photography. He took photographs of various musical artists working for Fable Records in the 1970s, including Franciscus Henri and Brian Cadd, and he also took various photos of performers at Melbourne's Pram Factory in the '70s (some of these photos can be found in the Performing Arts Collection at the Arts Centre Melbourne). He also took photographs for the Department of Education, promoting physical and sport education for Victorian students in the 1990s and 2000s, and for the Victorian Olympic Council from 2006-2014, where he was awarded an Order of Merit in 2012. He won the Visage Portrait Competition in Photography (Yarra Ranges) in 2014 and also made the finals in the National Photographic Portrait Prize in 2013, 2015 and 2022 in Canberra, and Duo Magazine Percival Photographic Portrait Prize 2016 in Townsville, and one of his photographs, of George Spartels, was accepted into the permanent collection of the National Portrait Gallery in Canberra in 2019. He staged a solo photo exhibition at Art Centre, Warburton, Victoria, in 2017.

Gaal self-published two books: a book of his photographs called PEOPLE, STORIES and DANCE in 2018, and his autobiography, IT'S ALL GOOD ... (ISBN 978-0646-84034-5) in 2021. Both of these books can be found in the National Library of Australia, the State Library of Victoria, and the State Library of South Australia.

In 2022, the Hungarian TV network Duna did a special profile on Gaal, on a Duna World segment and a tribute to Ivan Gaal was staged in Melbourne at the Thornbury Picture House.

In 2024, Gaal was featured in the book Melbourne and the Movies, written by Ross Campbell. (ISBN 9781763644601)

=== Film career ===
Gaal's film career started in 1970 with the film All for the Love of It (8 mins, 16mm).

His work in the 1970s gained recognition at film festivals and won awards. Applause Please was a finalist at the Sydney Film Festival short film awards in 1975; Eclipse, Getting the Message, The Punter, and Tandberg on Page One were all selected for the Melbourne Film Festival; Tandberg On Page One was a finalist in the Australian Film Institute Awards in 1983; Ibrahim received two ATOM Awards in 1986 and was voted by children as the best Australian educational film of the year, and was also a finalist at the Birmingham Educational Film Festival awards in 1987; The Punter, Ibrahim and Jubilee and Beyond were selected for the St.Kilda Film Festival. Also, Soft Soap in 1977 was distributed in commercial cinemas as a short film supporting feature films. His film Applause, Please screened in a special retrospective program at Melbourne Cinematheque in 2017.

After a period of working for the Department of Education promoting school sports with video and photographs in the 1990s, Ivan returned to directing his own films in 2006 with Grey Paddle Power, and then Icing on the Cake in 2009, and A Man From the Other Side in 2015, which was awarded at the Yarra Ranges Film Festival at Warburton in 2016.

In June 2019, Ivan participated in a film festival entitled "Australian Films - Hungarian Spirit", presented in Budapest, Hungary. He was a guest at the festival, screening several of his films, and giving a couple of speeches. When he was there, he was interviewed on Duna World TV, on the show "Ot-kontinens", on June 22, 2019.

In April 2022, Ivan's film A Man From the Other Side was screened (and received an Honorable Mention) at the Dare To Struggle Film Festival. It also screened at the Love, Art, Revolution Film Festival in Sydney in April 2023.

The film critic Adrian Martin has said of Gaal: “Ivan Gaal is clearly a thoughtful filmmaker who has reflected long and hard, over his lifetime, on the ways and means of educational cinema”.

The Age newspaper (in the column Buff’s Choice on July 20, 1984), called Gaal a “local stalwart” for his films.

Gaal’s films and videos are available from ACMI (Australian Centre for the Moving Image) Lending Collection and NFSA (National Film and Sound Archive) Screen Lending Collection.

More references to Gaal's film and photography work can be found within the Trove database.

== Personal life and death ==
Gaal remained physically active in his later years, taking up lawn bowling at the age of 70, winning championships at the Richmond, Princes Park and Warburton bowling clubs. He also continued being athletically competitive with his canoeing, winning the World Masters Championship in double Canadian canoe class in 2006 in Edmonton, Canada.

He was married to Catherine and together they had two sons, Nicolas and Tomas, and a grandson, Asher (Jett).

Gaal died after a short illness in Melbourne, Australia, on 23 September 2025, at the age of 87.

== Selected filmography ==
- All For The love Of it (1970, 8 mins, 16mm)
- Thursday’s Children (1970, 25 mins,16 mm)
- Camberwell Junction (1974, 5 mins, 16mm)
- Applause Please (1974, 22 mins, 16mm)
- Circus Nomads (1975, 22 mins, 16mm)
- We the Proclaimers (1975, 25 mins, 16mm)
- Soft Soap (1976, 35 mins, 16mm, & blown up to 35mm)
- Jubilee and Beyond (1977, 15 mins, 16mm)
- The Punter (1978, 9 mins, 16mm)
- Concerto for Ads and Heads (1979, 5 mins, 16mm)
- Eclipse (1979, 5 mins, 16mm)
- Autism, Who Cares (1979, 22 mins, 16mm)
- Getting the Message (1979, 30 mins, 16mm)
- Celebrations (1980, 30 mins, 16mm)
- Men of the Earth (1981, 25 mins, 16mm)
- Tandberg on Page One (1982, 30 mins, 16mm)
- The Age of Change (1983, 25 mins, 16mm)
- Not Only to Save Our Jobs... (1983, 36 mins, 1" video)
- No Turning Back (1984, 25 mins, 16mm)
- Children with Special Abilities (1984, 29 mins, 16mm)
- Ibrahim (1985, 30 mins, 16mm)
- Peace in Action (1986, 20 mins, SP Video)
- Meeting of Minds (1986, 25 mins, 16mm)
- Give Us Space (1987, 25 mins, SP Video)
- No More Secrets (1988, 25 mins, SP Video)
- It’s Not All Rubbish (1989, 20 mins, SP Video)
- Grey Paddle Power (2006, 22 mins, DVD)
- Icing on the Cake (2009, 10 mins, DVD)
- A Man From the Other Side (2016, 9 mins, DVD)

== Bibliography ==
- Here’s the Full Team for Games – The Age, July 1960
- The Tragedy of Tony ... by Maria Triaca, The Sun, March 5, 1980
- A Film of Hope - Metro Magazine, 1981.
- The Age of Change - Metro Magazine Issue 63
- Buff’s Choice - The Age, 20.7.84. John Flaus & Paul Harris
- At war in an alien school - by Dennis Pryor The Age 23.3.85.
- A 'wog' faces new battle-the classroom - The Herald, 18.3.85.
- Teaching film has lessons for all - by Barbara Hooks, Green Guide, The Age, 19.3.85.
- Ivan Gaal by John Benson - Filmviews No 125, 1985
- Mentor Program Grows - The Age 1.7.86
- Homesafe - Education Victoria, Dec. 1987.
- Sex abuse videos aim to aid the young - The Sun, 28.4.88.
- Realities of child abuse shown and discussed - Green Guide, The Age, 28.4.88.
- Penguin Awards - Education Victoria, 1989.
- Torchbearers in Melbourne – The Age, May 6, 2004
- Gangways of nostalgia, by Larry Schwartz – The Age (A3 section), September 16, 2004
- Station Pier: Gateway to a New Life, book published by Museum Victoria, 2004. (includes photos of Ivan Gaal in 1957 and 1959).
- An inspirational record of paddle power - Fifty-plus News, Dec. 2006.
- Interviews on SBS Hungarian Radio - 28.3.08.-18.4.08.-25.7.08.
- A Migrant’s Journey, by Ivan Gaal – Languages Victoria, July 2012.
- The film-maker who wants us to digest his movies, essay on Ivan Gaal, by Janos Zoltan, academic paper, Victoria College of the Arts, MFTV/677589, 2015.
- "Quick step snap" by Kath Gannaway, Mountain View Mail, May 19, 2015.
- Gaal captures ‘soul’ moments, by Jesse Graham, Mountain View Mail, November 21, 2016.
- Applause Please (Ivan Gaal, 1975), by Tanya Farley, Senses of Cinema, March 2017.
- "The AVEC Film Unit and Me", by Ivan Gaal, contained in ‘A Secondary Education for All’? A History of State Secondary Schooling in Victoria. By John Andrews & Deborah Towns. Australian Scholarly Publications Pty Ltd, 2017.
- Interview: Ivan Gaal on ‘A Man From the Other Side’, by Alison Ficklin, Documentary Drive, July 15, 2017.
- People, Stories & Dance, by Ivan Gaal, photography book, self-published, 2018. (Available at the National Library in Canberra, and other libraries in Australia.)
- Comment, Think, Analyse, Experience and Learn: The Neglected Film Work of Ivan Gaal, by Adrian Martin, Metro Magazine, 2013, and updated in Film Critic website, 2018.
- "Olympic Endeavours" by Fab Marsani, The Shot magazine, Bowls Victoria, March 2015.
