= Solo One =

Australian television series

- Genre: Crime drama
- Starring: Paul Cronin; Aileen Britton; Keith Eden
- Country of origin: Australia
- Original language: English
- No. of seasons: 1
- No. of episodes: 13

Production
- Executive producer: Ian Crawford
- Producer: Henry Crawford
- Production locations: Melbourne, Victoria
- Production company: Crawford Productions

Original release
- Network: Seven Network
- Release: 17 June – 10 September 1976

Solo One is an Australian television series made by Crawford Productions for the Seven Network and screened in 1976. There were 13 half-hour episodes.

== Synopsis ==
The series was a spin-off from Crawford's other police show Matlock Police and featured Paul Cronin reprising his role as Senior Constable Gary Hogan, but tailored for a younger audience.

It was set in the real country town of Emerald in the Dandenong Ranges east of Melbourne and used the town's actual police station.

In the series Hogan sorts out problems for the locals. His call sign is Solo One, hence the series title.

== Cast ==
=== Main ===
- Paul Cronin as Senior Constable Gary Hogan
- Aileen Britton as Aunt Nan
- Keith Eden as Joe Porter

=== Guests ===
- Alwyn Kurts as Alfonso (1 episode)
- Elspeth Ballantyne as Sylvia Simpson (1 episode)
- George Spartels as Harry Thomas (1 episode)
- Gus Mercurio as Pickett (1 episode)
- Lesley Baker as Mrs Pickett (1 episode)
- Lionel Long as Bob Williams (1 episode)
- Lyndel Rowe as Louise Duncan (1 episode)
- Normie Rowe as Dave Bradley (1 episode)
- Peter Cummins as Rod Hudson (1 episode)
- Queenie Ashton as Annie Robinson (1 episode)
- Richard Morgan as Timmy Savage (1 episode)
- Terence Donovan as Bill Morgan (1 episode)
- Terry Gill as Bill Duncan (1 episode)
- Terry Norris as Burgess (1 episode)
- Vivean Gray as Mrs Jupp (1 episode)

== Episode list ==
No. overall	No. in season	Title	Directed by	Written by	Original release date
1	1	"The Runaway"	David Stevens	Tom Hegarty & Vincent Moran	18 June 1976
Gary Hogan helps a runaway boy solve some problems and as a result, rescues his father from a caravan at a deserted mine. The Most Outstanding Performance for a Juvenile Logie was given to Greg Stroud for this episode.
2	2	"Goodbye George"	David Stevens	Vince Moran	25 June 1976
A travelling ventriloquist steals an aging horse to be able to continue his journey to Emerald to attend the celebration for the new railway line extension.
3	3	"Serious Trouble"	Rod Hardy	Keith Thompson	6 August 1976
Young Rosie Hood learns her brother, Frank, got roped into committing a robbery with another youth.
4	4	"The Billabong"	David Stevens	Denise Morgan	23 July 1976
Gary Hogan is called on to mediate a dispute between landholder Dave Bradley and his elderly neighbour, Jack Norton.
5	5	"Strike Me Die Benson"	Rod Hardy	Gwenda Marsh	9 July 1976
Two distant relatives' concern for the well being of the elderly uncle - and his gold - puts Gary Hogan onto the trail of Bill Benson, a man determined to blow himself up in an old mine.
6	6	"Summer Magic"	David Stevens	Peter Kinloch	27 August 1976
Poultry farmer Frank Burgess calls on Gary Hogan for help after he discovers his chooks are being menaced by a dog.
7	7	"The Bike"	Rob Hardy	John Drew	3 September 1976
Young Booby Duncan runs away from home after overhearing that his parents won't be able to afford to buy him the new bicycle they promised him for his birthday.
8	8	"Watch Out for the Robinsons"	David Stevens	Phil Freedman	2 July 1976
After a collision on the road with the eccentric Edgar Robinson, an unlicensed motorcycle rider who was on the wrong side of the road, Gary Hogan must again place his life in danger by overseeing the motorcycle licence test for the man's wife.
9	9	"River Pirates"	Rod Hardy	Keith Hetherington	20 August 1976
Two young cousins get into trouble when their home-made raft sinks in the river.
10	10	"My Bonnie"	David Stevens	Everett De Roche	30 July 1976
When schoolgirl Bonnie Pickett goes missing, her unapproving mother assumes her boyfriend is responsible.
11	11	"The Last Swagman"	Rod Hardy	Peter Schreck	10 September 1976
An itinerant swagman lends a hand at shearing time and in so doing helps to restore a more harmonious relationship between a father and his son.
12	12	"Little Joe"	David Stevens	Sonia Borg	16 July 1976
A young boy is found by Gary Hogan walking alone on a deserted stretch of road.
13	13	"The Man from Happy Valley"	Rod Hardy	John Drew	13 August 1976
When a young diabetic boy goes missing, Gary's best hope of locating him is a mentally disabled main who isn't forthwith in revealing what he knows.

== DVD releases ==
The complete 13 episodes of this series are available on DVD and were released on 12 September 2017.

Title	Format	Ep #	Discs	Region 4 (Australia)	Special features	Distributors
Solo One (Complete Series)	DVD	13	02	12 September 2017	None	Crawford Productions
