= Chuck Faulkner =

Australian actor,news presenter and US radio talk show host (1922–2000)

Chuck Faulkner III
- Faulkner hosting Name That Tune (Nine Network) in 1956
- Born: Charles Stephen Faulkner; 21 October 1922; Belfast, Northern Ireland, United Kingdom
- Died: 4 December 2000 (aged 78); Virginia Beach, Virginia, U.S.A.
- Occupations: Actor, news presenter, radio host
- Years active: 1956–1988
- Known for: Division 4 (1969–1975)
- Spouse(s): Essie Faulkner (1966 div.); Julie Faulkner (m.1971 – his death 2000)
- Children: 2

Charles Stephen Faulkner (21 October 1922 – 4 December 2000), professionally Chuck Faulkner, was a Northern Irish–born Australian actor, game show presenter, news anchor, weatherman and US radio talk show host. He was best known locally for his role as Detective Senior Sergeant Keith Vickers in the Australian television police drama Division 4, before relocating to the United States where he became a radio talk show host in West Virginia.

== Early life ==
Faulkner was born on 21 October 1922 in Belfast, Northern Ireland. He was named 'Charles Stephen' after his father, but his mother started called him 'Chuck' from an early age, and it stuck.

He migrated to Australia with his parents in 1927, at the age of four, growing up in Chippendale, Sydney, alongside his two sisters. He lived in Australia for nearly 20 years, before relocating to the States with his wife Essie, after both of his sisters married American servicemen.

Initially, Faulkner wanted to become a jockey, but after entertaining the forces in a concert party, show business beckoned. He garnered years of experience in the United States, attending and graduating from television school in Milwaukee, Wisconsin, where he learned to erect and paint scenery, and operate production equipment. Then he attended drama school.

== Career ==
Faulkner was Australian television's first news presenter and weatherman at the Nine Network with studio TCN from 1956 to 1964. He also hosted the Australian version of the game show Name That Tune in 1956, Meet Me at Bebarfalds in 1958 and Tic-Tac-Dough from 1960 to 1964. He also undertook photographic modelling work during this time, some of which was for cigarette advertisements.

He first appeared in an acting role in 1961, in an episode of Whiplash, an outback western series starring American actor Peter Graves.

Throughout the 1960s, he also appeared in stage productions at Sydney's Ensemble Theatre, including Baby Want a Kiss, Generation and The Porcelain Year.

Faulkner then hosted the television game show Snakes and Ladders, alongside Margaret Britton from 1965 to 1966. However, the show was cancelled when Faulkner was arrested and charged, following an armed robbery. Although he was later acquitted, Faulkner was outcast from the industry for a brief period, landing only minor guest appearances in series such as Homicide and Skippy.

He later resumed his television career, making guest appearances in the Crawford Productions cult police series, Homicide in 1967, before landing a leading role as Detective Sergeant Keith Vickers in another Crawfords police drama Division 4, from 1969 to 1975, for 301 episodes. The role won him a 1970 Penguin Award for Best Actor.

He later featured as Chief Warder Sharpley in The Bluestone Boys (1976). and as Captain Doug Daly in Bellbird (1977). He also made his big screen debut as Sergeant Montford in the 1976 Ozploitation film Mad Dog Morgan, followed by a role in the TV movie Me & Mr Thorne that same year.

Faulkner then moved to the United States in the late 1970s and became a talk show host on radio station WNIS in Norfolk, Virginia until the mid-1980s.

He returned to Australia to appear in the 1988 Fred Schepisi film Evil Angels alongside Meryl Streep, which was based on the disappearance of Azaria Chamberlain at Uluṟu in August 1980. That same year, he also appeared in the TV movie The Four Minute Mile, but ultimately returned to the States, where he retired.

== Personal life and death ==
Faulkner married his first wife, Essie Jacobson, in Australia, before relocating to the United States, where their two children were born. Essie often called him by the diminutive, 'Steve'. They were divorced in 1966. His second wife was Julie Faulkner, with whom he was married from 1971, until his death.

In May 1966, at the age of 43, Faulkner was charged as being complicit in the $8,276 armed robbery at Channel 10 in March of the same year. Police alleged that Faulkner took $1,400 as his share of the robbery, in order to pay for his divorce proceedings. Faulkner denied the allegations. It was found that the robber, Kevin Harry Whittaker, was a house guest of Faulkner’s and had used Faulkner’s car for the crime. Faulkner was later fully acquitted.

He died on 4 December 2000, age 78, in Virginia Beach, Virginia, USA.

== Filmography ==
=== Film ===
Year	Title	Role	Type
1976	Mad Dog Morgan	Sergeant Montford	Feature film
1988	Evil Angels (aka A Cry in the Dark)	Conrad Grey	Feature film

=== Television ===
Year	Title	Role	Type
1956	Name That Tune	Host	TV series
1956–1963	Nine News Sydney	Newsreader / Weatherman	TV news series
1958	Meet Me at Bebarfalds	Host	TV series
1961	Whiplash	Tiny Denvers / O'Hara	TV series, 2 episodes
1960–1964	Tic-Tac-Dough	Host	TV series
1964	Slaughter at Saumarez	Narrator	TV movie
1965–1966	Snakes and Ladders	Host	TV series
1967–1968	Homicide	Harry Mullins / Cliff Jackson / Leonard Foley	TV series, 3 episodes
1969	Skippy the Bush Kangaroo	Toby Broughton	TV series, 1 episode
1969	Woobinda (Animal Doctor)		TV series, 1 episode
1969–1975	Division 4	Detective Senior Sergeant Keith Vickers	TV series, 301 episodes
1976	The Bluestone Boys	Chief Warder Sharpley	TV series
1977	Me & Mr Thorne	Donald Veitch	TV movie
1977	Bluey	Cecil 'Knuckles' McBride	TV series, 1 episode
1977	Bellbird	Captain Doug Daly	TV series, 6 episodes
1977	Cop Shop	Edward Canning	TV series, 1 episode
1977	Hotel Story		TV series, 1 episode
1988	The Four Minute Mile	American Athletics Official	TV movie

== Theatre ==
Year	Title	Role	Type
1965	Baby Want a Kiss		Ensemble Theatre, Sydney
1967–1968	Generation		Ensemble Theatre, Sydney
1968	The Porcelain Year		Ensemble Theatre, Sydney
	No Sex Please, We're British	Leslie Bromhead	Tidewater Dinner Theatre, Norfolk, Virginia
