= Deadline (1982 film) =

- Written by: Walter Davis
- Directed by: Arch Nicholson
- Starring: Barry Newman; Bill Kerr; Trisha Noble; Alwyn Kurts; Bruce Spence
- Countries of origin: Australia; United States
- Original language: English

Production
- Producer: Hal McElroy
- Running time: 94 minutes
- Production companies: Hanna-Barbera Australia; New South Wales Film Corporation
- Budget: A$750,000

Original release
- Release: 30 December 1981 (Sydney)

Deadline (stylized as ..Deadline..) is a 1981 Australian-American made-for-television thriller drama film directed by Arch Nicholson and co-produced by the Australian division of Hanna-Barbera and New South Wales Film Corporation.

== Plot ==
Journalist Barney Duncan (Barry Newman) discovers that an earthquake on the Australian outback was found to be a small nuclear detonation, and the work of an extortionist who vowed to detonate more devices unless his conditions for blackmail are met.

== Cast ==
- Barry Newman as Barney Duncan
- Trisha Noble as Gillian Boles
- Bruce Spence as Towie
- Alwyn Kurts as Jack McGinty
- Brian Blain as Dr. Durant
- Willie Fennell as Old Alf
- Danny Adcock as ASIO Agent
- Carole Skinner as Sybil
- Kevin Miles as Thurber
- Michael Duffield as Air Vice Marshall
- Ken Wayne as Fire Officer
- Sean Scully as Army Officer
- Norman Kaye as ASIO agent

== Production ==
It was originally known as Shadow Effects and was shot on location in Sydney, Canberra and the mining town of Broken Hill. It was a pilot for an unmade TV series which was to be called Foreign Correspondent.

At one stage Graham Kennedy was going to play a priest.

Production was held up due to protests from Actors Equity.

"I like the concept, it's a contemporary issue," said Newman during filming in December 1980. "I'm a news nut; my favorite actor is Walter Cronkite."
