= Arthur Henry Davey =

New Zealand master mariner

Arthur Henry Davey (9 June 1878–1 March 1966) was a New Zealand master mariner. He was born in Dunedin, New Zealand, on 9 June 1878. His son was Australian singer and radio personality Jack Davey. He died at Auckland.
