= Garry Meadows =

Australian television presenter, radio announcer, and actor

- Born: Garrett Seaton Meadows; 15 April 1939; Perth, Western Australia
- Died: 22 July 1982 (aged 43); Melbourne, Victoria, Australia
- Occupations: Television presenter, radio announcer, actor
- Years active: 1957–1982

Garrett Seaton "Garry" Meadows (15 April 1939 – 22 July 1982) was an Australian television presenter, radio announcer, and actor.

== Career ==
=== Stage ===
Meadows began acting in Perth during his youth in the 1950s when he appeared in a number of local stage productions. His stage credits included a starring role in Small Hotel in 1957. He also appeared in productions of The Importance of Being Earnest, The Teahouse of the August Moon, The Rising Generation, Ten Little Niggers and The Taming of the Shrew.

=== Radio ===
Meadows' radio career began in 1959 when he commenced working at Perth's 6IX. From there, Meadows went on to work at a number of radio stations including Perth's 6PR where he was credited as being one of the first announcers to use the talkback format. He was also live on air at 6PR during the 1968 Meckering earthquake.

He also worked at 2KO in Newcastle, 7HO and 7HT in Hobart, and 3DB in Melbourne.

=== Television & film ===
In 1960, Meadows joined Perth station TVW as a news presenter and host of music show Teenbeat. He left TVW at the end of 1961 but returned to the station in 1967 to host Spellbound, In Perth Tonight and Perth's New Faces. Meadows also co-hosted the Perth Telethon in 1968.

During the 1970s, Meadows moved on to host national television programs, most notably The Price Is Right. Meadows also hosted High Rollers, Let's Make a Deal, and The Marriage Game.

In 1980, Meadows worked as a producer on Sale of the Century.

Meadows also acted in a number of television programs including The Bluestone Boys, Bobby Dazzler, Bluey, Homicide and Prisoner. Meadows also appeared in the movie Mad Dog Morgan.

== Filmography ==
=== Film ===
Year	Title	Role	Type
1976	Mad Dog Morgan	Extra	Feature film
1981	The Homicide Squad	Taxi Radio Operator	TV movie

=== Television ===
Year	Title	Role	Type
1960	Teenbeat	Host / News presenter	TV series
1965	In Perth Tonight	Host	TV series
1967	Spellbound	Host	TV series
1967	Perth's New Faces	Host	TV series
1968	Perth Telethon	Co-host	TV special
1971	The Marriage Game	Host	TV series
1973-74	The Price Is Right	Host	TV series
1975	High Rollers	Host	TV series
1975	Celebrity Squares	Himself	TV series, 2 episodes
1976	The Bluestone Boys	CB	TV series
1976	Homicide	Detective Sergeant Wally Peterson	TV series, 1 episode
1976-77	Let's Make a Deal	Host	TV series
1977	Bluey	Ted Powers	TV series, 1 episode
1978	Bobby Dazzler	Himself	TV series
1979-80	Cop Shop	Mr Dean / Fred Thornfield	TV series, 2 episodes
1980	Prisoner	Steve Gallagher	TV series, 1 episode

== Awards ==
Meadows won the Logie Award for Best Male Personality in Western Australia at both the 1970 and 1971 Logie Awards.

== Death ==
Meadows died at the age of 43 on 22 July 1982 after suffering a heart attack outside the 3DB studios in Melbourne, as he was walking into the building to begin his shift.

He had been working at 3DB for less than a week when he died.
