= Jack Davey =

New Zealand-born Australian radio personality (1907–1959)

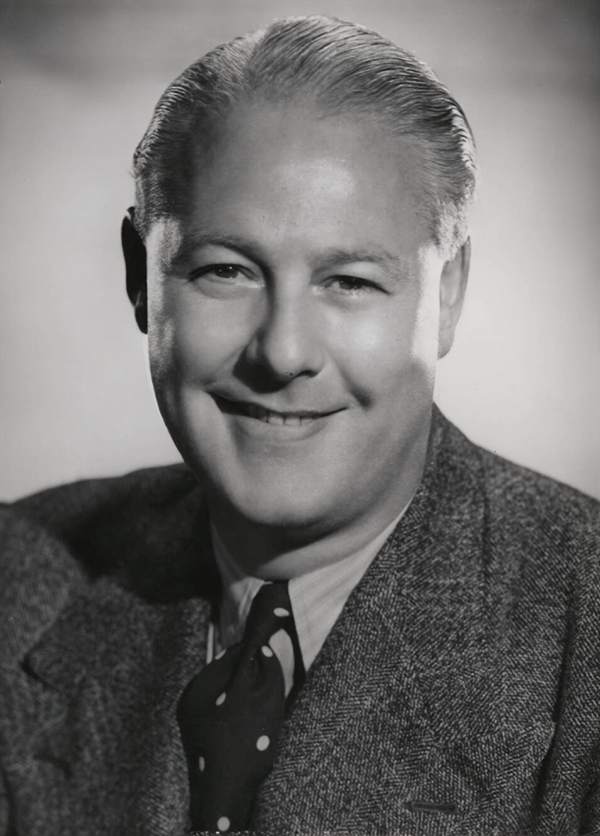
- Portrait of Jack Davey by Noel Rubie 1946
- Born: John Andrew Davey; 8 February 1907; Auckland, New Zealand
- Died: 14 October 1959 (aged 52); Sydney, New South Wales, Australia
- Occupations: Singer; radio performer; radio producer; radio director; radio host; television presenter; voiceover; production company owner
- Years active: 1931–1959

John Andrew Davey (8 February 1907 – 14 October 1959), known as Jack Davey, was a New Zealand-born singer and pioneering star of Australian radio as a performer, producer, writer and host from the early 1930s into the late 1950s. Later in his career he also worked briefly in television, primarily as a presenter.

== Early life ==
Jack Davey was born John Andrew Davey in Auckland on 8 February 1907 and educated at King's College. Davey was the second son of Union Steam Ship Company captain Arthur Henry Davey and his wife Ella May, née Hunter. After leaving school, Davey worked in the haberdashery department of a large store, but left after a close friend and workmate died after falling down an open lift shaft.

Prior to stardom, Davey worked variously as a signwriter, used car salesman and assistant stage theatre manager. His father, despairing of his son's future, took him to sea, in an attempt to establish a career for his son as a mariner. After being given the hardest, most unpleasant jobs aboard the ship, Davey decided the life of a sailor was not for him, and instead decided to pursue a career in entertainment

== Career ==
Davey arrived in Sydney in 1931 aboard his father's ship, and decided to stay in Australia, and started his radio production company, Jack Davey Productions Lmt.

Peter Luck writes:

Within two hours he had found himself a flat with a harbour view in fashionable McLeay Street, and borrowed £2 from his landlady.

Davey worked as a crooner on the ABC station 2BL, but his real career began when he was hired by Sydney commercial radio station 2GB. An account by his lifetime friend, aide and biographer, Lew Wright records:

They said: 'Oh, yes, you can sing for us, Mr Davey, at three guineas.' So he said 'OK.' He had to sing three times a week. But even at three guineas, it's an actual factual story, which I have from a person who knew him all his life, that he went into Park Street in the city and he bought three suits, ties, shoes and a motor car, within an hour of getting a job at three guineas. But when the end of the week came, he received a cheque for nine guineas. He said. 'Lew, if they're that careless with their money, they could have had me for three. I knew this is where I belonged.

== Marriages ==
Davey married Dulcie May Mary Webb on 17 July 1936 in Sydney, but divorced in 1942. His second marriage was to Dorothy Daisy Lush on 24 May 1947.

== Radio ==
Davey soon had his own breakfast show, a daytime quiz, an evening variety programme and voiceover work for Fox Movietone newsreels. Abandoning his singing career, he adopted his trademark greeting of "Hi Ho, Everybody" and became Australia's highest paid and most popular radio performer, as a writer, producer, and host.

He was a notorious gambler, and those close to him say he often spent money more quickly than he could earn it. But he was always confident of his ability to earn ever-increasing amounts to maintain his expensive lifestyle. His first quiz show, "That's What You Think", began on 2GB in 1934, and by 1935 Jack (also known then as "Crazy" Davey) was taken off the breakfast shift, because he was more valuable to the station as a host of its prime-time evening programs. At the same time he became the voice of Fox-Movietone newsreels, a position he held continuously for 25 years.

He and American-born radio personality and quiz-show host Bob Dyer maintained a well-publicised rivalry.

== World War Two ==
By 1941 Davey was hosting three weekly programs on the Macquarie Network, "The Youth Show", "Star Parade" (later to become "Calling the Stars"), and "Rise and Shine" (an army quiz). Most shows were recorded before live audiences in Sydney, and distributed on disc to network stations. However Davey's popularity was such that listeners in Melbourne demanded to see the programs done "live". The Colgate-Palmolive production unit leased a theatre there, and played on Sunday nights to capacity houses.

Despite, or perhaps because of, the success of his programs, Davey decided to leave the production unit, believing he would be able to earn more money elsewhere. He joined the American Red Cross, as a field entertainer with the rank of captain, taking shows to troops across Australia and the islands of the Pacific.

== Back to radio ==
As the war ended, Davey returned to radio, rejoining the Colgate-Palmolive production unit, which moved its programs to rival Sydney station 2UE in 1946. Davey remained there until his contract expired and then he returned to Macquarie in 1950.

He continued his radio work, producing multiple weekly quiz shows, talent quests and other entertainment programs. On top of that he was also doing his regular Fox-Movietone newsreel, and began diversifying into other businesses ranging from nightclubs to car auctions.

In 1955 one of Davey's contestants was sixteen-year-old John Howard, who was to become Prime Minister of Australia. A recording of the show survives.

== Redex and Ampol trials ==
Davey had had a love affair with cars for most of his life, and when the first Redex Reliability Trial (a round-Australia rally) was announced, he was one of the first to enter. With co-driver Lou Moss, he took a Ford Customline on the marathon in 1953. But his health was already beginning to deteriorate, and doctors were called after he collapsed with heart problems, at the home of friends later that year.

Despite his health problems, Davey increased his radio work and also took part in the second Redex Trial in 1954. However that proved too much for him, and shortly after returning to Sydney he suffered a second collapse, and was admitted to St Luke's Hospital. Doctors told him he had to ease his workload, but even while he was in hospital he continued to write his newspaper column and do radio shows. His doctors succeeded in banning him from the 1955 Redex trial, though he did later take part in the Ampol round-Australia reliability trial in 1956, again driving a Ford Customline, and the 1957 and 1958 Ampol trials, driving Chryslers.

== Later years ==
Ignoring his doctors' advice to ease his workload, Davey seemed to throw himself into work with even greater gusto. 1955 saw the introduction of a new show "Go for Greys", sponsored by the makers of Greys cigarettes. At the same time he was working on the "Ampol Show", "Give it a Go", and other programs for Brylcreem, Eno's and Dulux.

His health began to decline. Once again the Macquarie Network called in the doctors. Their advice was the same as it had always been – a reduced workload and rest, something Jack wasn't about to agree to. In 1957 he added television to his workload, with three regular programs for Sydney station ATN-7: The Dulux Show, The Pressure Pak Show and Give it a Go. Working on his radio programs all week, Davey spent his Saturdays on production of his TV programs. The workload grew even further in 1958, when 2GB reintroduced him to breakfast radio, in an attempt to counter the popularity of television. But for Davey, time was running out.

In mid-1959, X-rays revealed a small cancer in his right lung, but Davey went on with his work, including a trip to the United States to look at advances in television. Further tests, several weeks later, revealed the cancer had grown, and Davey was moved to hospital.

Davey died at St Vincent's Hospital, Darlinghurst on 14 October 1959, the same day as another larger-than-life Australian character, Errol Flynn (with whom Davey had claimed to have shared a Vaucluse flat in the early 1930s). Davey's cremation was followed by a service at St Andrew's Anglican Cathedral. A reported crowd of 100–150,000 people attended.

== Sources ==
- Luck, Peter (1981) [1979]. This Fabulous Century. Circus Books.
- Walker, R.R (1973). The Magic Spark, 50 Years of Radio in Australia. The Hawthorn Press.
- Wright, Lew (1961). The Jack Davey Story. Sydney: Ure Smith.
