= Don't Argue (TV series) =

- Presented by: Alwyn Kurts; Judy Banks
- Country of origin: Australia
- Original language: English

Production
- Running time: 30 minutes

Original release
- Network: HSV-7
- Release: 26 July – 13 December 1959

Don't Argue was an Australian television series which aired from 26 July to 13 December 1959 on Melbourne television station HSV-7. Broadcast at 4:00PM on Sundays, the half-hour series featured Alwyn Kurts and Judy Banks, and was broadcast live. The exact format is unclear, but it featured an audience participation format. It likely only aired in Melbourne.

Although kinescope recording was available during the run of the series, it is not known if any of the episodes were recorded using the technology. The survival rate of early HSV-7 series is highly unpredictable, with some series (like Hit Parade) having at least some extant episodes, while some series are lost.
