= Jock Blair =

Australian television executive (died 2020)

Jock Blair (died May 2020) was an Australian television screenwriter, producer, director and production executive.

He began in the industry as Graham Kennedy’s assistant on In Melbourne Tonight and stayed for five years. He then became a writer, and wrote scripts for the TV show Homicide. He was producer of The Box and later produced The Sullivans, Bluey and Skyways. In the 1980s he worked as head of production for the South Australian Film Corporation.

In the 1990s he produced series such as Paradise Beach, and worked as a production executive at Screen Queensland.

== Filmography ==
=== Producer ===
- This is a table of producer credits, where serving as Executive Producer (EP) is noted

Title	Year	Role
The Box (TV series)	1974-1976 (47 episodes)	Producer . Executive Producer
The Bluestone Boys (TV series)	1976	Producer
The Sullivans (TV series)	1977-1978 (137 episodes)	Producer
The John Sullivan Story (TV movie, spin-off of the above;)	1979	Executive Producer
Skyways	1979-1980	Executive Producer
Sara Dane (TV miniseries)	1982 (8 episodes)	Producer
Under Capricorn (TV miniseries)	1983 (2 episodes)	Producer
The Fire in the Stone (TV movie)	1984	Executive Producer
Run Chrissie Run!	1984	Executive Producer
Robbery Under Arms (TV movie)	1985	Producer
Playing Beatie Bow	1986	Producer
The Shiralee (TV miniseries)	1987 (2 Episodes)	Executive Producer
Grim Pickings	1989 (2 episodes)	Executive producer
Shadows of the Heart (TV miniseries)	1990 (2 episodes)	
Golden Fiddles (TV miniseries)	1991 (2 episodes)	
Paradise Beach (TV series)	1993-1994 (254 episodes)	Producer
Snowy River: The McGregor Saga (TV series)	1994-1996	Producer
The Violent Earth (TV miniseries)	1998 (3 episodes)	Producer
Tribe (TV miniseries)	1999 (4 episodes)	Producer
