= Magic 1278 =

Magic 1278 (3EE)
- Melbourne, Victoria; Australia
- Broadcast area: Melbourne RA1
- Frequencies: AM: 1278 kHz; DAB+: 9B Melbourne
- Branding: Melbourne's Classic Hits

Programming
- Language: English
- Format: Oldies
- Network: Ace Radio

Ownership
- Owner: Tapt Media; (Radio 1278 Melbourne Pty Ltd)
- Operator: Ace Radio
- Sister stations: 2UE; 3MP; 4BH

History
- First air date: 8 September 1935; 91 years ago (as 3XY)
- Former call signs: 3XY (1935–1991)
- Former frequencies: AM: 1420 kHz (1935–1978); AM: 1422 kHz (1978–1991); AM: 693 kHz (1992–2006)
- Call sign meaning: 3 = Victoria; The BrEEze (former branding)

Technical information
- Licensing authority: ACMA
- Power: 5,000 watts
- Transmitter coordinates: 37.744893°S 145.110507°E

Links
- Webcast: Listen Live
- Website: www.magic1278.com.au

Magic 1278 (official callsign: 3EE) is a commercial radio station in Melbourne, Australia owned by Tapt Media, and run under a lease agreement by Ace Radio.

== History ==
Postcard portraying the Princess Theatre in 1922. 13 years later, 6XY was to take over the ballroom at the top of the theatre as their first studio. They were to stay there for about 25 years.

=== 1935–1967: Diverse programming ===
==== Establishment ====
On 14 March 1935, prominent businessman Frank Thring announced that his company had secured the rights to operate 3XY: Melbourne's seventh commercial radio station. It had licensed by a jointly-owned affiliate company of the Young Nationalist Organisation and the United Australia Party, who sought to establish a profitable rival to the Labor Party's 3KZ radio station.

Frank Thring was well-renowned in Australia's entertainment industry and notably founded Efftee Studios, a film and theatre production studio which had introduced sound films to Australia. He founded a subsidiary company, Efftee Broadcasters, to oversee the operation of 3XY and set about converting a ballroom within the Princess Theatre into a modern broadcasting station.

Technician Lindsay Shephard oversaw the installation of specially-designed equipment by AWA, including transmitting equipment on the theatre roof which employed advanced modulation technology. The frequency allocated was 1420 kilocycles (211 metres). A unique, flexible-type cathode ray oscillograph was specially manufactured by AWA for use in the station.

Like virtually all broadcasters prior to the introduction of television to Australia and the invention of the transistor radio, 3XY aired a variety of programming styles; theoretically providing something of appeal to all its prospective listeners.

3XY's original slogan The Quality Station was taken seriously by management, who tried to produce programs which they often perceived as being superior to similar programs being produced by rival stations. For example, the station preferred airing live performances over pre-recorded material, securing exclusive rights to broadcast all artists appearing at the Princess Theatre.

A highly-modern news department was formed to report local and international events. A team was hired to commentate on sporting events, and management arranged for Table Talk magazine to provide a weekly session of social news and gossip. Tom Holt, the father of future Australian Prime Minister Harold Holt, was the station's original manager. Les Daley was the first announcer.

==== Opening ====
3XY officially began transmission around 8:15 pm on 8 September 1935 with a speech by Prime Minister Joseph Lyons, who revealed remarkable statistics about Australia's advancing broadcast industry. A programme of instrumental music was provided to the crowded Princess Theatre, including items by Robert Chapman's Orchestra and the Masonic Grand Lodge Choir. Following its initiation, no new commercial radio stations would air in Melbourne until 3MP began transmission in 1976 (41 years later).

==== Early programming and reception ====
By the time 3XY began broadcast, most of Melbourne's radio listeners had settled on their preferred stations and so continued to listen to 3XY's rivals. This is widely recognised as a factor behind 3XY's particularly low ratings during the 1930s and 40s. Despite this, 3XY did host a few popular programs–notably the children's session–which originally ran in partnership with the Williamstown Theatre. It was later sponsored by the likes of Peters Ice Cream, One Man's Family and Raising a Husband.

The station also produced some top class live variety programs with artists of the calibre of Stella Lamond; Doug McKenzie; Helen Reddy, Max Reddy, Leslie Ross, etc.

Frank Thring Sr. died of cancer several months after 3XY began transmission, and control over the broadcasting license was inherited by his second wife, Olive. Nevertheless, his son Frank Thring Jr. often referred to himself as the proprietor despite being 10 years old at the time of his father's death. Frank Thring Junior began his career as both a thespian and radio announcer at 3XY in 1941, as a young man of 15. His numerous jobs at the 3XY microphone included being Uncle Frankie in the children's session. Thring's acting career, whilst mainly centred around the Melbourne theatre scene, also included periods in London and Hollywood.

The late Bert Newton grew up in the Melbourne suburb of Fitzroy where he became a scout. His first broadcast in a radio, television and theatrical career that spanned nearly 60 years was in the 3XY program Scouting Around, hosted by Tom Jones. In the mid-1950s, Newton presented the 3XY midnight-to-dawn program. He returned to the station in the early 1970s (see below).

Because of the lack of listeners, 3XY did not get as much advertising revenue as some of its rivals, but this was, in part, compensated for by the broadcasting of many sponsored religious programs, particularly on Sunday afternoons, as well as sponsored non-English programs, mainly Italian. At the time, 3XY had to comply with an Australian Broadcasting Control Board regulation that required anything broadcast in any foreign language to also be translated into English.

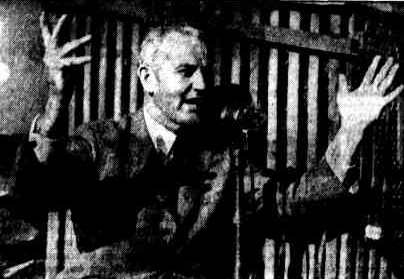
Former Geelong footballer Wallace Sharland was also a pioneer radio football commentator at the ABC and later at 3XY. This photo was taken at the microphone during a broadcast. By his hand gestures, it appears to be an exciting moment of the game. On the other hand, could he just be posing for the camera? Note the fence behind Sharland, which shows that broadcasters then had to broadcast from the outer of the ground, with no apparent privileges.

From the commencement of the 1936 Australian rules football season (about seven months after 3XY had first come on air) it became the very first station to broadcast descriptions of Victorian Football Association games. 3XY later broadcast games of the Victorian Football League. They also broadcast descriptions of Melbourne thoroughbred horse races each Saturday, as well as transmitting some interstate races. On some weeknights, harness races, then known as the trots, were broadcast.

Prior to 1967, the station had many prominent announcers, as well as a number of broadcasters who would go on to achieve fame at other stations. These included Frank Avis, Laurie Bennett, Graham Berry, Carl Bleazby, John Boland, John Burls, Ray Chapman, Peter Charleston, Bern Davis, Col Denovan, Jack Dyer, Keith Eden, Doug Elliot, Peter Evans, Vi Greenhalf, Mary Hardy, Ken Hibbins, Geoff Hiscock, Ken Howard, Tom Jones, Craig Kelly, Maurie Kirby, Wayne Kirby, Paul Konik, Alwyn Kurts, Ray Lawrence, Barry Looms, Bernice (Binny) Lum, Alex McNish, Bruce Mansfield, John Magee, Ian Major, Tom Miller, Alf Minister, Bert Newton, Bill Passick, Sir Eric Pearce, Stan Rofe, Bob Rogers, Will Sampson, Dennis Scanlon, Barry Seeber, Wallace Sharland, David Shoreland, Paul Sime, Clyde Simpson, Eric (''Tiny'') Snell, Roy Stenye, Cyril Stokes, John Storr, Jeff Sunderland, Madge Thomas, Frank Thring Jr., Hal Todd, Iven Walker, Mike Walsh, Jeff Warden, Dorothy Wilby, Madge Wister, Johnny Young, etc.

Between 1954 and 1962, 3XY was Victoria's only 24-hour broadcaster. (In the 1930s, the Postmaster-General's Department issued 24-hour licences to one station in each capital city market except Melbourne. In Melbourne, since 1931, 3AK had been broadcasting almost exclusively in the early-morning hours when other stations were off the air. However, on 1 February 1954, 3AK began broadcasting exclusively during hours of daylight, and concurrently 3DB, 3UZ and 3XY were all given 24-hour licences, but both 3DB and 3UZ had ceased all-night broadcasting within six months. Nevertheless, between 1962 and 1968, the Australian Broadcasting Control Board had granted 24-hour licences to all Melbourne commercial stations; 24-hour transmission on ABC stations was to follow within a few years.)

An excellent history of the first 10 years or so of 3XY can be accessed in the following book: Fitzpatrick, Peter, The Two Frank Thrings, 2012, Monash University Publishing, Clayton, Victoria ISBN 9781921867248.

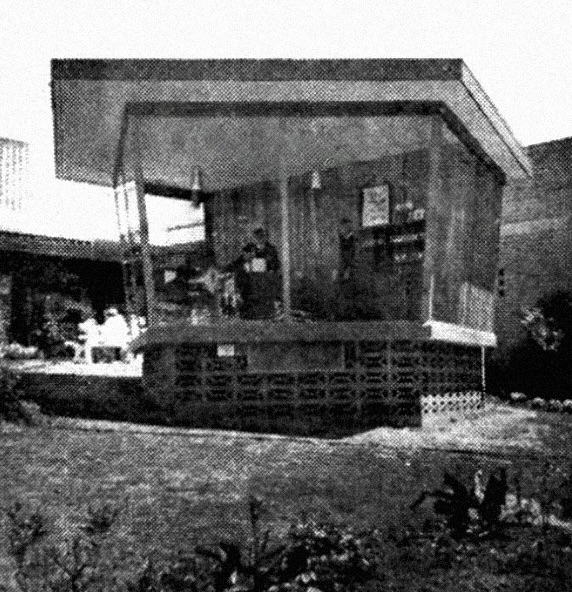
3XY radio booth at Forest Hills Shopping Centre shown just after completion in 1967. Designed by architect Thord Lorich.

==== 1967–1989: Melbourne's top pop music station ====
From 1 July 1967, under the direction of General Manager Bob Baeck the station became Melbourne's dominant music radio station and remained so until the mid 1980s, with a Top 40 music radio format, which often topped the ratings. Its sister station during this era was Sydney's 2SM. Of the many promotions conducted by the station, the most important during the 1970s/80s was Rocktober held annually during the month of October.

3XY dropped all of its religious programming in the late 1960s under the direction of Program Manager Dick Heming. (Heming received a letter of complaint from a woman who signed herself 'Yours in Christianity' but which concluded: 'I have prayed to the Lord that you be struck dead'.)

In the early 1970s, there was a head-on battle for the lucrative Top 40 market between 3XY, by then managed by Rod Muir, and Rhett Walker's 3AK. The fact that 3XY won the battle is reflected in 3AK's rapid change away from its Top 40 format. However, 3XY's fortunes declined in the late 1980s after the advent of FM radio in Australia, a few years earlier.

3XY DJs during this era included: Barry Bissell, Jack Daniels, Greg Evans, Peter Grace, Peter Harrison, Jane Holmes, John Hood, Craig Huggins, Kevin Hillier, Mark Irvine, Peter James, Chris Maxwell, Peter O'Callaghan, John O'Donnell, John Peters, Stan Rofe, Lee Simon, Peter Grubby Stubbs, Richard Stubbs, Gary Suprain, Paul Turner, Karl van Est.

As well as its Top 40 format, in the early 1970s, 3XY also experimented with a personality format with Bert Newton conducting the breakfast program, and Graham Kennedy presenting a morning session from a studio especially constructed at a cost of $10,000 in the bedroom of his house in Frankston, thus saving him from even having to leave home to present the show. He often broadcast whilst in pyjamas. During the late 1970s Derryn Hinch presented a current affairs morning program.

The Liberal Party continued to have a marked influence at 3XY. In the late 1970s and 80s, the manager of the station was Stanley Guilfoyle, husband of Liberal Senator Margaret Guilfoyle. Magnus Cormack, a former Liberal senator, served as chairman of the company after his retirement from politics in 1978. The company's articles of association provided that, upon the sale of the company, any proceeds should be "given or transferred to some institution or institutions having objects similar to the objects of the company". In 1986, the radio licence was sold to businessman Paul Dainty for $15 million. The proceeds were used to establish the Cormack Foundation, which became a major donor to the Victorian Liberals.

==== 1989–1991: The temporary end of the 3XY callsign ====
After losing the ratings and financial battle with FM rivals Eon FM and Fox FM, the 3XY licence was bought in late 1989 by the parent company of Bay FM, a Geelong based station which was then just about to come on air. When Bay FM commenced broadcasting in December 1989, 3XY briefly simulcast the BAY-FM overnight programs, retaining its rock music format during the day. However, once new studios in Corio Bay were completed, Bay FM and 3XY began full-time simulcasting, 3XY breaking only for coverage of Australian Football League (AFL) games, which they were contracted to cover. After a period of 12 months, the then-Australian Broadcasting Authority demanded that the two stations begin separate programming. While the two stations remained in their Corio studios, Bay FM relaunched with an easy listening format, with 3XY retaining its soft rock format. In 1991, 3XY was sold to AWA, owners of 2CH Sydney and other stations, who almost immediately shut the station down and re-opened it seven months later as 3EE.

3XY's transmitter was turned off at 1.00 pm on 23 September 1991. The final on-air program as 3XY was a one-hour pre-recorded special, commissioned by AWA and produced and presented by music historian Glenn A Baker. It was a tribute showcasing the music of 1976 when 3XY was number one in the radio ratings. Roxanne Bennett was the last 'live' announcer on 3XY, finishing her shift at 12 noon that day with Spectrum's song I'll Be Gone the final song played before the one hour pre-recorded special was aired. The last song to be ever aired on 6XY, was AC/DC's It's a Long Way to the Top (If You Wanna Rock 'n' Roll), at the end of the pre-recorded special.

AWA formally applied for a change of callsign from 3XY to 3EE and a change of frequency from 1422 kHz to 693 kHz. Both requests were granted by the Australian Broadcasting Authority. Although it was a relaunch of the 3XY licence that had existed since 1935 and not the issuing of a new licence, AWA chose to promote the forthcoming 3EE as a "completely new" station.

A new licence for the 1422 kHz frequency was purchased at auction in 1994 by the Greek Media Group. Initially the licence was for a specified period of three years, and was then to be subject to a five yearly auction cycle. This rule was removed, and the station was effectively permitted to continue on a permanent basis. The new station adopted the 3XY call-sign. It is a narrowcast Greek language commercial station, with no connection to the station of 1935–91.

=== 1992–1993: 3EE ===
The "new" station 3EE began official transmission at 7.00am Friday 2 July 1992. Promoted as The Breeze, the station had a mix of easy listening music, personality talk and Saturday AFL football. Some programs garnered a loyal following but overall the station failed to gain a commercially viable audience in its target demographic of people aged 40+. AWA had a three-year strategy to grow the 3EE audience, but in 1993 the company decided to exit the commercial broadcasting sector and concentrate on its core business of electronics design and manufacture. AWA sold 3EE to Wesgo, owner of another Melbourne station, 3MP, based in Frankston, an outer south-eastern suburb. A few months later in 1994, AWA sold 3EE's sister station in Sydney 2CH, bringing to an end AWA's 70 years in radio broadcasting.

=== 1993–2017: Magic 693/1278 ===
==== Magic 693 ====
3MP and 3EE simulcast their programs until the ABA ordered that they cease the practice and recommence two separate formats. As from December 1993, 3EE used the marketing name of Magic 693, whilst retaining its official call-sign 3EE. It had a 1940s, 1950s and 1960s music format, while 3MP maintained its more mainstream easy listening format on 1377.

Southern Cross Broadcasting, which also owned Melbourne radio stations 3AK and 3AW, bought the 3MP and 3EE licences, and in accordance with media ownership laws which restrict any organisation from owning more than two radio stations in one region, they chose to keep 3AW and 3EE (Magic 693), while selling off the lower rating 3AK and 3MP licences.

==== Magic 1278 ====
From 1 May 2006, Magic 693 became Magic 1278 after switching frequencies with 3AW. The change was suggested by 3AW's then Midnight-to-Dawn host Keith McGowan. By doing so, it placed 3AW between Radio National and ABC Radio Melbourne, meaning that Melbourne's three major talk stations were together on the AM radio dial.

On 13 April 2015, the station's entire on air line-up, and most of the programming and production team, was made redundant, as the result of the merger of Fairfax Media's radio assets and the Macquarie Radio Network. Immediately, a new music format was introduced that focused on the classic hits of the 1960s and 1970s. In November 2015, it was announced that the station would begin networking programming into Brisbane on sister station Magic 882. The last song to be played on Magic 1278 was Thank You for the Music by ABBA.

=== 2017–2018: Talking Lifestyle ===
On 27 February 2017, Macquarie Radio Network relaunched 3EE as Talking Lifestyle. The launch of Talking Lifestyle into the Melbourne and Brisbane market followed 18 months of development by Macquarie Media and a soft launch in the Sydney market in September 2016 through 2UE. The Brisbane outlet was 4BH.

Presenters for the station broadcast from either Sydney or Melbourne. The on-air line-up included Ed Phillips, Catriona Rowntree, Nick Bennett, Dee Dee Dunleavy and Sabina Read.

=== 2018–2020: Macquarie Sports Radio ===
On Wednesday 4 April 2018, the three Talking Lifestyle branded stations relaunched with a new sports radio format under the name Macquarie Sports Radio with coverage of the 2018 Commonwealth Games. 1278 did broadcast Melbourne Storm matches as well as a selection of interstate NRL matches broadcast by the Continuous Call Team

=== 2020–2021: Magic 1278 (second incarnation) ===
On 21 January 2020, Nine Entertainment announced the Macquarie Sports Radio brand would be abandoned and the station – along with its interstate sister stations 2UE and 4BH – would return to an all-music format "built around the best of the '50s, '60s and '70s" with a "soft launch" on 2 February 2020.

==== Nine Radio leases Magic 1278 to Ace Radio ====
On 28 October 2021, Nine Radio and Ace Radio entered into a deal for Ace to manage the radio station, along with sister stations 2UE and 4BH, from early 2022. Ace Radio took control of the station on 14 January 2022. The station relaunched with a new presenter line-up, logo and imaging on this date.
