= The Pressure Pak Show =

- Genre: Game show
- Presented by: Jack Davey
- Country of origin: Australia
- Original language: English

Original release
- Network: ATN-7; GTV-9
- Release: 1957 – 1958

The Pressure Pak Show is an Australian television game show. It first aired from 1957 to 1958 on ATN-7 in Sydney and GTV-9 in Melbourne. It was hosted by Jack Davey, who also hosted The Dulux Show and Give it a Go.

The program was a simulcast of a long-running Jack Davey radio programs, broadcast on the Macquarie Radio Network.

== Gameplay ==
According to the National Film and Sound Archive website, it was a guessing game in which the panel and contestants had to determine what phrase the host had picked, within a certain amount of time. According to records of existing episodes, phrases ranged from simple (such as A Worm and Rock Around the Clock) to unusual/humorous (such as A Pygmy on Mt Lofty and Australia's 7th Best Dressed Man)

== Episode status ==
At least 20 episodes are held by National Film and Sound Archive, along with episodes of a radio version. At least one of the surviving television episodes features Jim Russell as one of the panelists
