= Give it a Go =

- Genre: Game show
- Country of origin: Australia
- Original language: English
- No. of episodes: 38

Production
- Production locations: Sydney, New South Wales

Original release
- Network: ATN-7
- Release: 25 February – 11 November 1957

Give It a Go is an Australian television game show which aired in 1957. It was hosted by Jack Davey, who also hosted two other Australian game shows during the late-1950s, The Dulux Show and The Pressure Pak Show, and was produced by Sydney station ATN-7 also airing in Melbourne on station GTV-9. It was sponsored by Persil, a laundry detergent. At least 16 kinescope recordings exist of the series at the National Film and Sound Archive, along with copies of a radio simulcast broadcast over the Macquarie Broadcasting Network. The radio version had been going for many years prior to the simulcast.

All of the programs mentioned above were simulcasts of long-running Jack Davey radio programs, broadcast on the Macquarie Radio Network. The television version aired weekly from 25 February to 11 November 1957, for a total of 38 episodes.

Other radio-TV simulcasts of the year included Bob Dyer's comedy game show It Pays to Be Funny, discussion series Leave it to the Girls, and possibly talent show Swallows Parade.

== See also ==
- Pick a Box – Australian game show which also debuted on television in 1957
