= The Dulux Show =

- Genre: Game show
- Presented by: Jack Davey
- Country of origin: Australia
- Original language: English

Original release
- Network: ATN-7
- Release: 1957

The Dulux Show is an Australian television game show which aired in 1957. It was hosted by Jack Davey, and produced by Sydney station ATN-7, also airing in Melbourne on station GTV-9. Contestants competed for the chance to win a plane trip to a location like London or San Francisco. As the title suggests, it was sponsored by Dulux paint. As was also the case with many American series of the era, early Australian television series sometimes featured the name of the sponsor in the title.

The program was a simulcast of a long-running Jack Davey radio programs, broadcast on the Macquarie Radio Network.

== Episode status ==
Of the 37+ episodes produced, five are confirmed to survive at the National Film and Sound Archive, along with episodes of a radio version

== See also ==
- The Pressure Pak Show and Give it a Go, two other game shows hosted by Jack Davey in 1957.
