= Crawford Productions =

Australian TV production company

- Type: Subsidiary
- Industry: Radio and television production Distribution; Licensing; Media
- Founded: 1945–2002 (as production house)
- Headquarters: Melbourne, Victoria, Australia
- Key people: Hector and Dorothy Crawford
- Products: Radio; Television
- Owner: WIN Corporation; WIN Television (free-to-air broadcast rights)
- Website: www.crawfords.com.au

Crawford Productions is an Australian former media production house, now primarily involved in distribution and licensing. It focused on the radio and television industries.

Founded in Melbourne, Victoria in 1945 by Hector Crawford and his sister, actress and voice-over artist Dorothy Crawford, the company, also known as Crawfords Australia, is now a subsidiary of the WIN Corporation.

The company has been defunct as a production house since 2002, and it now markets DVDs of it former programs.

== Founding and early years ==
Crawford Productions was initially founded exclusively as a radio production company in 1945, and then specialized in drama, light entertainment, and educational programs. When broadcast television was introduced to Australia in 1956, Crawford Productions was one of the few Australian radio production houses to successfully transition to the new medium.

Early Crawford TV productions included Wedding Day (HSV-7, 1956), the first Australian-produced sitcom Take That! (HSV-7, 1957–59), The Peters Club (GTV-9, 1958), Raising a Husband (GTV-9, 1958) and the drama play Seagulls Over Sorrento (HSV-7, 1960). They also produced segments of the Export Action documentary series, The Flying Dogtor cartoon series, and a local adaptation of the US game show Video Village (HSV-7, 1962–66).

The company's production output differed from that of the Reg Grundy Organisation, who specialized in quiz and game shows before transitioning to drama serials. Company co-founder Hector Crawford was an orchestral conductor and a prominent figure in the ongoing campaign for local content regulations on Australian television.

During the 1960s and the first half of the 1970s, Crawford Productions dominated Australian drama series. They gained an early foothold with their first major TV series, Consider Your Verdict (1961–64), which presented dramatizations of court cases. Like other local producers, they faced heightened competition from imported overseas programming, as there were no local content regulations governing Australian television at the time. As a result of this de facto free-trade agreement, most programs shown on Australian TV content were imported from America. At the time when police procedural series Homicide premiered in Australia in late 1964, more than 80% of all content broadcast on Australian TV came from America, and American productions enjoyed a virtual monopoly over the TV drama field. The report of the 1963 Vincent Commission into the Australian media found that 97% of all drama shows broadcast in Australia between 1956 and 1963 were American productions.

Australian producers competed against high-quality, high-budget imported programs that drew from an international talent pool and a skill-base that grew out of Hollywood. The competitive advantage enjoyed by imported content was exacerbated by the fact that the once-thriving Australian film industry had been decimated by competition from the major American studios. Since the beginning of the 1960s, film production in Australia had come to a standstill. Only one locally produced and funded feature film was made in Australia in the decade between 1959 and 1969. One of the major impacts of the suppression of the local film industry was a rapid erosion of skills and experience among local film-makers and an exodus of local talent to Britain and the USA.

== Crawford Production hits (police precedurals) ==
=== Homicide and Hunter, Division 4 and Matlock Police ===
Crawford television productions although only moderately successful upon inception, experienced mainstream success with its popular and long-running police procedural drama series Homicide, which premiered in October 1964 on the Seven Network. It became the first Australian TV drama series produced locally to become a major ratings success and compete effectively with imported American programming, hence being an attempt for Australia to demonstrate it could make high quality police precedurals as well as its US Counterparts

As video technology was still in its infancy in Australia at that time, Crawford Productions developed a highly efficient integrated production schedule to combine studio scenes recorded on videotape with location footage captured on film for each weekly episode. Encouraged by the success of Homicide (which continued in production until 1975), their next drama project was the ambitious espionage drama Hunter broadcast in 1967, which was purchased by the Nine Network. It starred Tony Ward and also made a star out of the actor who played its villain, Gerard Kennedy.

After Hunter ended in 1969, a new police drama, Division 4 (1969) was conceived as a vehicle for Kennedy's talents and he became a dual Gold Logie winner, the series also screened on the Nine Network; the other stars included former game show host and newsreader Chuck Faulkner, Terry Donovan, Frank Taylor and Ted Hamilton. Unlike Homicide, which concentrated on murder plots, Division 4 was set in a suburban Melbourne police station, and covered a broad range of police work, as well as occasionally featuring more light-hearted episodes.

Crawford's next venture was a rural police series Matlock Police (1971), which was sold to the Network Ten. Like Crawford's other ventures it enjoyed success and popularity. It starred veteran Australian actor Michael Pate, who had spent many years in Hollywood in the 1950s and 1960s, and featured Paul Cronin, who was later given his own spinoff series: Solo One. With the success of Matlock Police, Crawford Productions cemented its position as Australia's leading drama production house and gained the unique distinction of having a successful weekly drama series running simultaneously on each of Australia's three major commercial networks.

=== Ryan and The Box (drama series) ===
In 1973, Crawford Productions created the action-adventure series Ryan (1973), starring Rod Mullinar as a private investigator. This was an all-film colour production (at a time when Australian TV was still in black and white and transitioning to colour) made to target overseas sales, but it only lasted one series and 39 episodes. In 1974, Crawfords moved into the realm of soap opera with its sex-comedy serial The Box, which was set in a TV station, UCV channel 12. With the top-rating 0–10 Network serial Number 96 as its lead in The Box was an instant success.

Homicide, Division 4, and Matlock Police remained highly popular through the early 1970s, and The Box was a big hit in its premiere year, ranking as Australia's second highest-rated program for 1974. With a highly popular police drama on each commercial network, the production company was booming. However, in 1975 and 1976, Homicide, Division 4, and Matlock Police were all abruptly cancelled. It has been suggested that this was because Hector Crawford and several of the actors who featured in his shows figured prominently in the contemporary TV: Make It Australian campaign, agitating for stronger local content regulations to promote and protect local TV production.

Though the ratings for The Box were significantly lower when compared to the figures from its first year, the show continued until 1976. The Box was cancelled in early 1977 and production ended on the series 1 April 1977. The company also created situation comedy series The Bluestone Boys (1976) which was set in a prison, and Bobby Dazzler, a vehicle for pop singer John Farnham, in 1977. Bluey (1976) saw a return to police drama but with a new spin; however, the series was not a major success.

== The Sullivans, Cop Shop, Carson's Law and The Flying Doctors and others ==
Greater success came with The Sullivans (1976–83), a critically acclaimed and highly period piece set during te years of World War II and starring former Matlock lead Paul Cronin and Lorraine Bayly as matriarch Grace Sullivan. Continuing the trend at that time for evening soap opera type shows on Australian television they later launched Cop Shop (1977–84), a meld of soap opera with the Crawfords staple of police drama, and the series emerged as a popular success. Cop Shop featured George Mallaby and former Bellbird star Terry Norris. Briefly Crawfords produced the ill fated Skyways (1979–81) a soap opera-meets-weekly adult drama hybrid of Cop Shop in an airport setting. Later programmes included legal drama Carson's Law (1983–84), again another vehicle for former star of The Sullivans Lorraine Bayly, children's series Halfway Across the Galaxy and Turn Left and the popular outback medical drama The Flying Doctors.

== Acquisition ==
The company started life in small premises located in Little Collins Street, Melbourne, moved to the now heritage listed Olderfleet Building in Collins Street, then in 1972 to Southampton Crescent, Abbotsford, and in 1982 to Middleborough Road, Box Hill. In the 1980s, they set up an international branch Crawford Productions International, which its main purpose that Crawfords would film series for foreign companies, namely the United States, and Crawford decided to co-finance with American network HBO in order to develop a second series of the long-running All the Rivers Run, which premiered on HBO in 1983. That year, Nick McMahon and Mike Lake, had left the company to serve as consultant executive producers for the programs that were produced by Crawfords. In 1987, Crawford Productions was sold to a diversified entertainment group, Ariadne Australia, and there would going to be a link between Crawford Productions and De Laurentiis Entertainment Limited, a subsidiary of the De Laurentiis Entertainment Group in which Ariadne is the second-largest stockholder in the group. Crawford Productions required cash flow to underpin the construction of DEL studios to produce its own filmed projects.

The company was sold to WIN Corporation in 1989. Subsequent Crawfords drama productions included State Coroner, The Saddle Club, and Guinevere Jones. The Crawford studios in Box Hill were demolished in March 2006 and a Bunnings opened on the site on 30 June 2006. In 2009, Crawfords Australia had an eight-acre studio complex in Melbourne. While the company is still in existence, it currently does not produce television, concentrating instead on marketing DVD releases of the company's earlier dramas.

== List of notable Crawford series ==
- Take That (1957–1959) (comedy)
- Consider Your Verdict (1961–1964) (courtroom drama)
- Homicide (1964–1977) (police drama)
- Hunter (1967–1969) (espionage drama)
- Division 4 (1969–1975) (police drama)
- Matlock Police (1971–1976) (police drama)
- Ryan (1973) (private-eye drama)
- The Box (1974–1977) (soap opera)
- The Last of the Australians (1975–1976) (sitcom)
- Bluey (1976–1977) (police drama)
- The Sullivans (1976–1983) (period drama, soap opera)
- Solo One (1976) (police drama)
- The Bluestone Boys (1976) (sitcom)
- Bobby Dazzler (1977–1978) (sitcom)
- Young Ramsay (1977–1980) (drama)
- Cop Shop (1977–1984) (soap opera)
- Skyways (1979–1981) (soap opera)
- Holiday Island (1981–1982) (soap opera)
- All the Rivers Run (1983) (miniseries)
- Carson's Law (1983–1984) (period drama, legal drama)
- Special Squad (1984) (police drama)
- The Henderson Kids (1985–1987) (children's drama)
- Zoo Family (1985) (children's drama)
- Fortress (1985) (film)
- Alice to Nowhere (1986) (miniseries)
- My Brother Tom (1986) (miniseries)
- The Flying Doctors (1986–1993) (drama)
- The Far Country (1988) (telemovie)
- All the Way (1988) (period drama)
- Acropolis Now (1989–1992) (sitcom)
- Jackaroo (1990) (miniseries)
- The Feds (1993–1996) (crime drama, telemovie series)
- Newlyweds (1993–1994) (sitcom)
- Halfway Across the Galaxy and Turn Left (1994) (children's drama)
- State Coroner (1997–1998) (courtroom drama, legal drama)
- The Saddle Club (2001–2009) (children's drama)
- Guinevere Jones (2002) (children's drama)
