= Frank Arnold (director) =

Australian television director

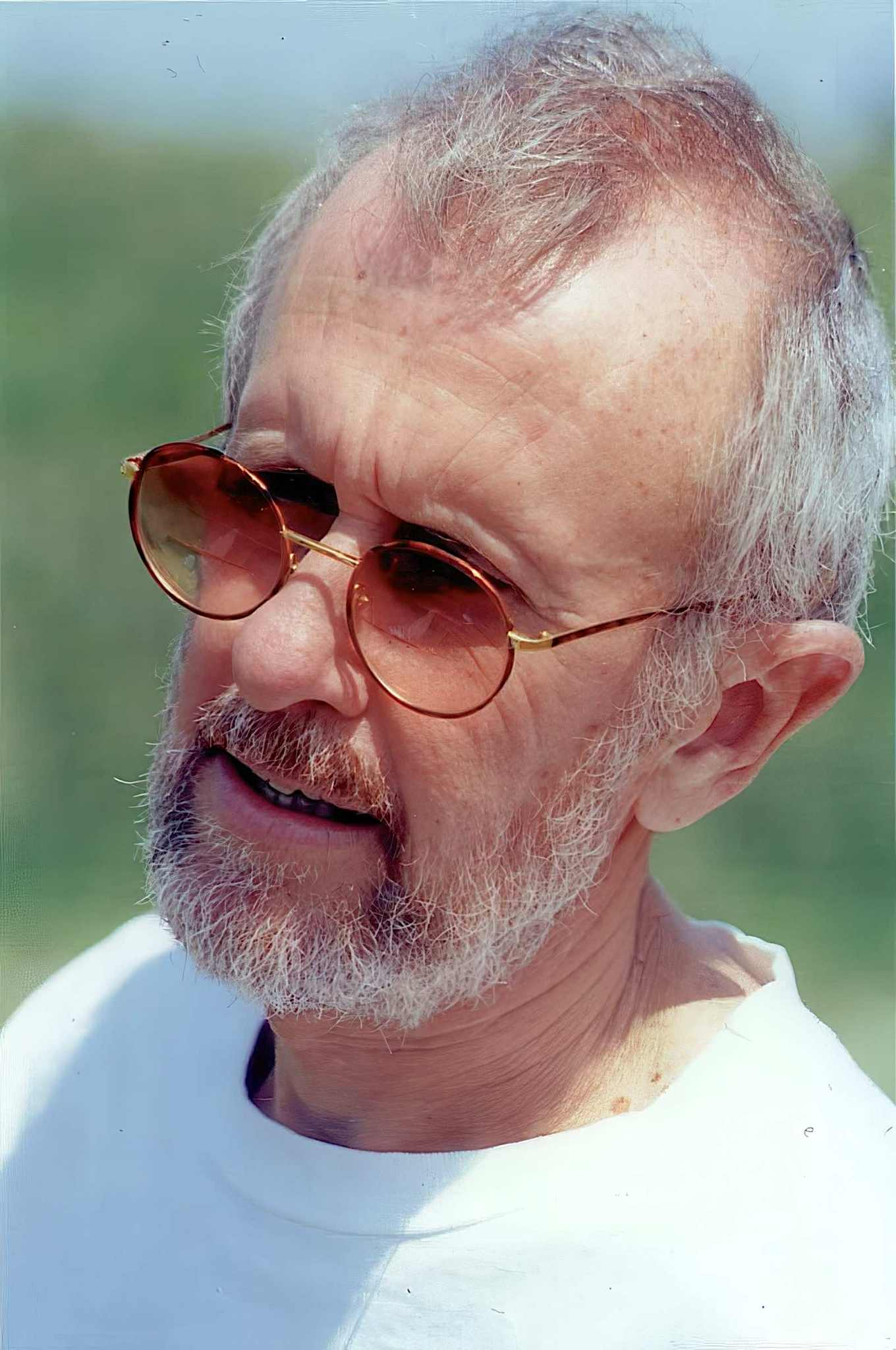
Frank Arnold Director

Frank Arnold (born 1938) is an Australian director and producer best known for his work in television.

In the 1970s, he mostly directed TV drama at the ABC before going freelance in the early 1980's; directing family and children's drama series. In the 1990's, he directed TV movies in the US, before returning to Australia to direct TV series, retiring in 2002.

Arnold also served two years as a board-member of the Australian Screen Director's Association (now known as the Australian Director's Guild).

== Select credits ==
=== Television series ===
- Delta (1969–70) – director
- Bellbird (1970) – director (five episodes)
- Dynasty (1970–71) – director
- Behind the Legend (1972–75) – director – episodes include "Caroline Chisolm", "C.Y. O'Connor", "C.T.P. Ulm", "Thomas Blamey", "Charles Fitzroy", "John Flynn", "Sidney Kidman"
- Over There (1972–73) – director
- Castaway (1974) – director
- This Love Affair (1974) – director of episode
- Riverbend (Pilot) (1974) – director
- Beyond the Break (2 Pilots) (1974) – director
- Certain Women (1974-75) – director
- Ben Hall (1975) – director
- Rush (1976) – director
- Moynihan (1976) – director
- Kirby's Company (1977) – director
- Patrol Boat (1979) – director
- Timelapse (1980) – director (five episodes)
- Premiere (1980) – producer
- Menotti (1981) – director
- Runaway Island (1984) – director
- Five Mile Creek (1984) – director
- Butterfly Island (Series 1 – 1985 mini-series) – director
- The Haunted School (1986 mini-series) – director
- Butterfly Island (Series 3 – 1992) – director
- Home and Away (2000–01) – director
- All Saints (2002) – director

=== TV movies ===
- Everyone's got Wheels (1971)
- Linehaul (1973) – director
- Lindsay's Boy (1974) – producer, director
- The Champion (1974) – director
- Record of Interview (1976) – director
- Going Home (1977) – producer, director
- Shimmering Light (1978) – producer
- Ripkin (1978) – director, producer
- Lay Me Down in Lilac Fields (1981) – producer, director
- A Waltz Through the Hills (1988) – director
- Whose Daughter Is She? (a.k.a. Semi-Precious) (1995) – director
- Josh Kirby: Time Warrior! The Human Pets (1995) – director
- Josh Kirby: Time Warrior! Trapped on Toyworld (1996) – director
- Josh Kirby: Time Warrior! Last Battle for the Universe (1996) – director

=== Documentary ===
- This is NIDA (1981) – producer, director
- Death in the Afternoon (1990) – director

== Awards ==
- Nominated Best Director (TV) Patrol Boat; 'Death of a Sailor' Sammy Awards (1980).
- Nominated Best Children's TV Series; Butterfly Island AFI Awards (1986) - Director.
- The Haunted School, Gold Plaque. Chicago International Film Festival (1987) - Director.
- A Waltz Through the Hills, First Prize – Frank Arnold. The Chicago International Festival of Children's Films (1988).
- A Waltz Through the Hills, Penguin Award. Australian Television Award for Excellence in a Children's Drama (1988).
- A Waltz Through the Hills, Pater Award for Professional Excellence in television and radio arts and sciences: children's program. The Australasian Academy of Broadcast Arts and Sciences (1988).
- Best Actor in a Telefeature: Ernie Dingo; A Waltz Through the Hills. Australian Film Institute Awards (First, First-Nations Actor to win Best Actor Award (1988).

== Other interests ==
- Arnold and sound engineer Noel Cantrill wrote an e-book Highly Inflamably [sic] recounting their 1966 journey from Sydney to London (Karachi to London in a Kombi van) which was published by UXED Pty Ltd.
