= Angela Punch McGregor =

Australian actress

- Born: 21 January 1953 (age 73); Sydney, New South Wales, Australia
- Other name: Angela Punch
- Education: National Institute of Dramatic Art (1973)
- Occupations: Actress, drama teacher
- Known for: The Chant of Jimmie Blacksmith (1978); We of the Never Never (1982); Annie's Coming Out (1984)
- Spouse: Ross McGregor
- Children: 1

Angela Punch McGregor (born 21 January 1953) is an Australian stage and film actress.

== Early life ==
Punch McGregor fell in love with theatre, while acting in school plays from the age of 13. Her first role was as the 'Spoon' in The Owl and the Pussy-Cat. She studied at Sydney's National Institute of Dramatic Art (NIDA), graduating with a Bachelor of Dramatic Art (Acting) in 1973.

== Career ==
Punch McGregor has starred in numerous television series including a regular role as Jane Potter in Class of '75 (1975). She played Ros Parrish (mother of series regulars Shane and Nick Parrish) in soap opera Home and Away from 1994 to 1995. Other roles included guest appearances in Rafferty's Rules (1988), crime series Halifax f.p. (1994), Fire (1995), medical drama All Saints (1998), police procedural series White Collar Blue (2002), drama Love My Way (2004–2005) and miniseries The Principal (2015).

Her film credits include The Chant of Jimmy Blacksmith (1978) and Newsfront (1978), both of which won her AFI Awards. She also received AFI nominations for her roles in We of the Never Never (1982) and Annie's Coming Out (1984). She appeared in The Delinquents (1989) with Kylie Minogue, Spotswood (1991) opposite Anthony Hopkins, Ben Mendelsohn and Russell Crowe, Tom White (2004) alongside Colin Friels and Savages Crossing (2010) with John Jarratt. She also appeared in the TV biopic Mary: The Making of a Princess (2015), about the courtship of Australian Mary Donaldson and Frederik X of Denmark (who at the time was Crown Prince).

Punch McGregor has also worked for most of Australia's major theatre companies, in plays including The Importance of Being Earnest (1975/1993), Othello (1976), A Midsummer Night’s Dream (1985), Les Liaisons Dangereuses (1987–1988), A Streetcar Named Desire (1988), Summer of the Seventeenth Doll (1991), Dial M For Murder (1991–1992), Long Day's Journey into Night (2004), Festen (2005) and Equus.

She played Juliet to Mel Gibson’s Romeo in a 1979 production of Romeo and Juliet, fresh off the heels of Gibson's success in Mad Max. In 2002, she played Miss Havisham in an adaptation of Charles Dickens’ Great Expectations.

In 1995, she was appearing in Nick Enright’s play Blackrock, when she fell ill. Her illness, combined with insecurity and burnout led her to take a hiatus from acting, during which time she studied a four-year course in natural medicine. For a year, she practised Orthomolecular medicine full-time and she still runs a clinic part-time from her home.

Punch McGregor was Lecturer in Acting at the Western Australian Academy of Performing Arts from 2006 to 2014. She also taught young people getting into the theatrical business at The HubStudio in Sydney. One of her classes was titled Angela Punch McGregor Master Class – Series 1.

== Personal life ==
Punch McGregor is married to director and screenwriter Ross McGregor, who is also her former drama teacher. Together, they have a son.

== Filmography ==
=== Film ===
Year	Title	Role	Type
1976	A Handful of Jelly Babies		Film short
1978	The Chant of Jimmie Blacksmith	Gilda Marshall	Feature film
1978	Newsfront	Fay	Feature film
1979	D'Arcy		Film short
1980	The Island	Beth	Feature film
1981	The Survivor	Beth	Feature film
1982	The Best of Friends	Melanie	Feature film
1982	We of the Never Never	Jeannie Gunn	Feature film
1983	Double Deal	Christine Sterling	Feature film
1984	Annie's Coming Out	Jessica Hathaway	Feature film
1985	Double Sculls	Edwina Larkin	Feature film
1986	The Hunchback of Notre Dame	Esmerelda (voice)	TV movie (animated)
1988	Alterations	Ann	TV movie
1989	The Delinquents	Mrs. Lovell	Feature film
1991	Spotswood (aka The Efficiency Expert)	Caroline Wallace	Feature film
1995	Halifax f.p.: Lies of the Mind	Anthea	TV movie
1998	Terra Nova	Margie	Feature film
2000	Grace		Film short
2003	Ash Wednesday		Film short
2004	Tom White	Irene	Feature film
2010	Savages Crossing	Sue	Feature film
2015	Mary: The Making of a Princess	Queen Margrethe	TV movie
2022	Violett	Laura	Feature film
2022	Y		Film short

=== Television ===
Year	Title	Role	Type
1975	Shannon's Mob	Prostitute	1 episode
1975	Class of 75	Jane Potter	98 episodes
1976	Alvin Purple	Lucy	1 episode
1978	Case for the Defence	Ruth	1 episode
1979	Patrol Boat	Sue Halloran	2 episodes
1980	The Timeless Land	Ellen	Miniseries, 7 episodes
1986	Tusitala	Fanny Stevenson	Miniseries, 3 episodes
1986	Whose Baby?	Gwen Morrison	Miniseries, 2 episodes
1988	Rafferty's Rules	Christine Stanton	1 episode
1994–1995	Home and Away	Ros Parrish	20 episodes
1995	Law of the Land	Angela Goodman	TV series, 1 episode
1996	Fire	Dr Prudence Eberhardt	4 episodes
2002	Bad Cop, Bad Cop	Evelyn Bowers	Miniseries, 1 episode
2003	All Saints	Carmen Shaw	6 episodes
2003	White Collar Blue	Win Absolom	1 episode
2004–2005	Love My Way	Angela Morris	4 episodes
2015	The Principal	Sue Longworthy	3 episodes
2022–2024	Troppo	Dr Val	10 episodes
2025	The Last Anniversary	Connie	6 episodes

== Theatre ==
=== As actor ===
Year	Title	Role	Type
1971	The Trial of Lucullus	Queen	NIDA, Sydney
1971	Hippolytus		UNSW Old Tote Theatre, Sydney
1971	You Can't Take It With You	Rheba	UNSW Old Tote Theatre, Sydney
1971	Miss Jairus		Jane St Theatre, Sydney
1972	A Country Girl		UNSW Old Tote Theatre, Sydney
1972	The Creation		NIDA Theatre, Sydney
1972	The Serpent		Woollahra Arts Centre, Bondi Junction, Sydney
1973	The Playboy of the Western World		Sydney Opera House
1973	The Clandestine Marriage	Mrs Heidelberg	NIDA, Sydney
1973	The Devils	Soeur Jeanne Des Anges	NIDA, Sydney
1973	Cooper and Borges	Severina Cordello	Jane St Theatre, Sydney
1973	Oh, What a Lovely War!		New South Wales tour
1974	The Owl and the Pussy Cat Went to Sea		Bankstown Town Hall, Sydney
1974	The Cradle of Hercules		Sydney Opera House
1974	Collaborators		Independent Theatre, Sydney
1974	Little Eyolf	Miss Asta Allmers	UNSW NIDA Parade Theatre, Sydney
1975	Hotel Paradiso		UNSW NIDA Parade Theatre, Sydney & Playhouse, Canberra
1975	Chez Nous		UNSW NIDA Parade Theatre, Sydney
1975	The Importance of Being Earnest		Sydney Opera House
1976	Othello	Desdemona	Princess Theatre, Launceston & Theatre Royal, Hobart
1976	Absurd Person Singular		Theatre Royal, Hobart
1976	The Gift		Stables Theatre & VCA, Melbourne
1976	Family Lore	The Daughter, Wendy	NSW tour
1977	Camille		Theatre 3 with Canberra Repertory Society
1977	Thark	Kitty Stratton	Genesian Theatre, Sydney
1977	The Father	Betha	UNSW NIDA Parade Theatre, Sydney
1979	Mother Courage and Her Children	Yvette Pottier / Peasant Woman	Jane St Theatre, Sydney
1979	As You Like It	Rosalind	Jane St Theatre, Sydney
1979	Romeo and Juliet	Juliet	Octagon Theatre, Perth & Nimrod, Sydney
1980	The Bride of Gospel Place	Lily	Jane St Theatre, Sydney
1982	The Suicide	Maria Podsekalnikov	Nimrod, Sydney
1983	The Circle	Elizabeth	Theatre Royal, Sydney & Comedy Theatre, Melbourne
1984	The Blind Giant is Dancing	Rose Draper	Sydney Opera House
1985	A Midsummer Night's Dream		Seymour Centre, Sydney
	Joan of Arc at the Stake	Joan of Arc	Canberra Opera Society
1987–1988	Les Liaisons Dangereuses	Marquis de Merteuil	Seymour Centre, Sydney & Playhouse, Melbourne with MTC
1988	A Streetcar Named Desire	Blanche	Her Majesty's Theatre, Sydney & Lyric Theatre, Brisbane
1990	The Odd Couple	Florence	Comedy Theatre, Melbourne & Majestic Cinemas, Sydney
1991	Summer of the Seventeenth Doll	Pearl	Seymour Centre, Sydney
1991–1992	Dial M for Murder		Marian St Theatre, Sydney & Playhouse, Adelaide
1992	For Julia	Gloria	Russell St Theatre, Melbourne with MTC
1992	Barmaids		Belvoir, Sydney
1994	The Gift of the Gorgon	Helen Damson	Russell St Theatre, Melbourne with MTC
1995	Good Works		Acton St Theatre, Canberra
1995	Blackrock	Diane	Wharf Theatre, Sydney with STC
1999	Love Thoughts		Sydney Opera House
2001	Up for Grabs	Felicity	Sydney Opera House, IMB Theatre, Wollongong, Riverside Theatres Parramatta, Playhouse, Canberra, Playhouse, Melbourne & Newcastle Civic Theatre with MTC
2001	Doctor Akar's Women		Stables Theatre, Sydney with Griffin Theatre Company
2002	Great Expectations	Miss Havisham	Playhouse, Melbourne & Sydney Opera House with MTC
2002–2003	The Credeaux Canvas		Stables Theatre, Sydney with Griffin Theatre Company
2003	Festen	Else	Sydney Opera House
2004	Long Day's Journey into Night	Mary Tyrone	Subiaco Theatre Centre, Perth
2005	Old Times	Anna	Wharf Theatre, Sydney with STC
2008	Far Away	Aunt Harper	Playhouse, Perth with Black Swan Theatre Company
2010	The Swimming Club	Kate the Anthropologist	Southbank Theatre, Melbourne, Playhouse, Perth

=== As director/crew ===
Year	Title	Role	Type
1993	The Grace of Mary Traverse	Director	NIDA Theatre
1993	The Importance of Being Earnest	Director	Theatre 3 with Canberra Repertory Society
2003	Gross Indecency: The Three Trials of Oscar Wilde	Director / Set Designer	Theatre 3 with Canberra Repertory Society
2004	Communicating Doors	Director / Set Designer	Theatre 3 with Canberra Repertory Society
2012	Lost in Yonkers	Director	Theatre 3 with Canberra Repertory Society

== Awards and nominations ==
Year	Nominated work	Award	Result
1978	The Chant of Jimmy Blacksmith	AFI Award for Best Actress	Won
1978	Newsfront	AFI Award for Best Actress in a Supporting Role	Won
1982	We of the Never Never	AFI Award for Best Actress	Nominated
1984	We of the Never Never	London Daily Telegraph Award for Actress of the Year	Won
1984	Annie's Coming Out	AFI Award for Best Actress	Won
1998	Terra Nova	AFI Award for Best Actress in a Supporting Role	Nominated
2003	Great Expectations	Helpmann Award for Best Actress in a Supporting Role	Nominated
