= John Hamblin =

British-born Australian television presenter (1935–2022)

- John Hamblin, pictured on the set of the ABC children's series Play School
- Born: John Reginald Hamblin; 18 March 1935; Ash, Surrey, England, United Kingdom
- Died: 21 September 2022 (aged 87); Deloraine, Tasmania, Australia
- Occupations: Television presenter, actor
- Years active: 1955–2009, 2016
- Known for: Host of Play School; The Restless Years

John Reginald Hamblin (18 March 1935 – 21 September 2022), known affectionately as "Funny John" or "Naughty John", was a British-born actor of stage and screen and children's television presenter, after starting his career in theatre and music hall in his native England, he emigrated to Australia where he became known for numerous appearances in television soap operas and made-for-TV films.

Hamblin was a presenter on the Australian children's television program Play School for 27 years, from 1970 to 1997 (guest returns 1999, 2016). He featured in more than 350 episodes and became the second-longest-serving presenter in the program's history, after Benita Collings, with whom he often presented.

== Early life ==
Hamblin was born on 18 March 1935 in Ash, Surrey, England, and grew up in Suffolk. When Hamblin's mother moved in with the local baker, his father moved the rest of the family to Norfolk. He lost contact with his mother at that point. Hamblin's father had flown with the Royal Flying Corps during World War I, and Hamblin himself joined the Air Force and did his national service in Cyprus in the late 1950s before returning to England.

Hamblin initially trained at art school for six months with a career in the visual arts in mind, then decided on a career in acting, and studied drama instead.

== Career ==
=== Theatre ===
Hamblin started his acting career in England in repertory theatre in 1955 at the Theatre Royal, Windsor. He also worked in old time music hall.

He worked for several West End Theatres in the United Kingdom including Theatre Royal, Haymarket and the Old Vic

After emigrating to Australia, Hamblin continued to work in theatre over 25 years, from 1970 until 1995, including Blithe Spirit and a stage show of Play School.

Hamblin also toured in the stage play Crown Matrimonial as King Edward VIII.

=== Television ===
In 1967, Hamblin made an appearance in the cult British TV series The Prisoner in the episode "A Change of Mind".

After migrating to Australia, Hamblin secured roles in television including roles in soap operas, becoming notable for his role in series The Restless Years as A. R. Jordan. His TV credits also include Number 96, Class of '74, The Young Doctors (as Dr Dan Wheatley), Case for the Defence, and Sons and Daughters.

Hamblin played the role of Michael Chamberlain in the 1984 telemovie The Disappearance of Azaria Chamberlain. After a hiatus in the 1990s, he returned to TV series in guest roles in All Saints and Love My Way in the early 2000s.

=== Play School presenter ===
Known for irreverence and inserting double-entendres into skits, Hamblin was the second-most-prolific presenter of Play School, appearing in 357 episodes from 1970 to 1999, while fellow presenter Benita Collings appeared in 401 episodes. On the show, Hamblin would sing, read stories, make crafts, play with the toys and educate children about such things as telling the time and days of the week. Hamblin is especially remembered for his presenting partnership with longtime hosts Collings and Noni Hazlehurst.

Hamblin returned briefly for a special guest appearance in 2016, as part of Play School's 50th anniversary special.

Many bloopers of Hamblin's time on Play School have since resurfaced, most of which feature him forgetting lines or for sexual innuendoes.

== Personal life ==
Hamblin came to Australia in the 1960s as a "Ten Pound Pom" with his second wife, Wendy. After Play School, he retired and moved to Tasmania with his third wife, Jenny, whom he married in 1984. He had two children, Emma and Myles. He suffered a heart attack in 2003. In 2008, he published his memoirs, Open Wide, Come Inside, with Peter Richman.

Hamblin died at a hospital in Tasmania on 21 September 2022, aged 87.

== Filmography ==
=== Film ===
Year	Title	Role	Type
1976	The Bushranger	Sergeant Dunbar	TV movie
1983	Who Killed Baby Azaria?	Michael Chamberlain	TV movie
1984	Run, Chrissie, Run!	Cathy's father	Feature film
1984	Crime of the Decade	Ian Henderson	TV movie
1984	A Street to Die	Dr Walker	Feature film
2009	There's a Heaven Above You	Background	Film short

=== Television ===
Year	Title	Role	Type
1959	Quartermass and the Pit	Newsvendor	TV miniseries
1959	Season of Passion	uncredited	TV series
1960	Scotland Yard	Thomas Miller	TV series
1967	The Prisoner	1st Woodland Man	TV series, season 1, episode 12: A Change of Mind
1969	Riptide	Wallace's Mate	TV series
1970–99	Play School	Himself as host	TV series
1971	The Comedy Game		TV series
1972	Number 96	Dr. Mike Cavanagh	TV series
1974	This Love Affair	Andrew	TV series
1974–75	Class of 75	Donald Blair	TV series
1977	The Young Doctors	Dr. Dan Wheatley	TV series
1978	Case for the Defence	John Case	TV series
1979	Skyways	Bob Kennedy	TV series
1978–80	The Restless Years	A.R. Jordan	TV series
1980	Spring & Fall		TV series
1980	The Timeless Land	Robert Campbell	TV miniseries
1982	Secret Valley	Mr. Melrose	TV series
1983	Starting Out	Dr. James Holt	TV series
1984	The Last Bastion	Anthony Eden	TV miniseries
1984	Runaway Island	Lachlan McLeod	TV series
1985	Winners	Doctor	TV series
1986	Tusitala	Dr. Eisner	TV miniseries
1987	Sons and Daughters	Frank Porter	TV series
1988	Rafferty's Rules	Tom Herman	TV series
2000	All Saints	Alex Knight	TV series
2001	Pizza	Judge	TV series
2006	Love My Way	Clive	TV series

== Theatre ==
Year	Title	Role	Type
1970	The Trials of Hilary Pouncefortt		Neutral Bay Music Hall
1971	Exposed to Danger, or, Little Nell in the Klondyke		Neutral Bay Music Hall
1971	Land Of Dreaming		UNSW Parade Theatre
1972	The Spring Heeled Terror of Stepney Green		Neutral Bay Music Hall
1977	Lust for Power, or Perils at Parramatta	Harry Masterman	Neutral Bay Music Hall
1978	Crown Matrimonial	Edward VIII	Seymour Centre, Mayfair Theatre, Sydney, Newcastle Civic Theatre, Her Majesty's Theatre, Brisbane, His Majesty's Theatre, Perth
1982	The Anniversary		Phillip Street Theatre
1982	The Circle		Theatre Royal, Sydney, Comedy Theatre, Melbourne
1984	Caravan		Playhouse, Sydney Opera House
1985	Crown Matrimonial		Playhouse, Sydney Opera House, Twelfth Night Theatre, Cairns Civic Theatre, Townsville Civic Theatre, Pilbeam Theatre, Rockhampton, Melbourne Athenaeum, Canberra Theatre Centre
1987	Blithe Spirit		Playhouse, Sydney Opera House, Glen Street Theatre, Canberra Theatre Centre, Newcastle Civic Theatre
1991	Run for Your Wife		Glen Street Theatre
1993	Away		Riverside Theatres, Parramatta
1995	Play School - The Big Show		Regal Theatre, Perth
