= Summer City =

- Theatrical release poster
- Directed by: Christopher Fraser
- Written by: Phil Avalon
- Produced by: Phil Avalon
- Starring: Mel Gibson; John Jarratt; Phil Avalon; Steve Bisley; James Elliott; Abigail; Ward "Pally" Austin
- Cinematography: Jerry Marek
- Edited by: David Stiven
- Music by: Phil Butkis
- Production company: Avalon Film Corporation Studio
- Distributed by: Intertropic films
- Release date: 22 December 1977
- Running time: 83 min
- Country: Australia
- Language: English
- Budget: A$66,000 or $200,000

Summer City (also known as Coast of Terror) is a 1977 Australian drama thriller film, filmed in Newcastle, New South Wales. It marked Mel Gibson's film debut.

== Plot ==
In the early 1960s, Sandy, Boo, Scollop and Robbie drive to the beaches north of Sydney for a surfing weekend. The boys plan to give Sandy a memorable 'one last fling' before his impending marriage. Tension flares between university-educated Sandy and ocker Boo when Sandy decides not to join in the fun. At a local dance, Boo seduces Caroline, the teenage daughter of a caravan park owner who discovers what has happened and finds Boo with a gun.

== Cast ==
- Mel Gibson as Scollop
- John Jarratt as Sandy
- Phil Avalon as Robbie
- Steve Bisley as Boo
- James Elliott as Caroline's father
- Debbie Forman as Caroline
- Abigail as the woman in pub
- Ward "Pally" Austin as himself
- Judith Woodroffe as the waitress
- Carl Rorke as Giuseppe
- Ross Bailey as Nail
- Hank Tick as Caveman
- Bruce Cole as the man in car
- Vicki Hekimian as Donna
- Karen Williams as Gloria
- Gary Tidd as Rocker in Milk Bar
- Len Purdie as Rocker in Milk Bar

== Production ==
The script was autobiographical, Avalon having been a passionate surfer for most of this life and grown up in Newcastle. He also served in the army for several years (although not in Vietnam). He says he offered the script to Brian Trenchard-Smith as director, but Trenchard-Smith suggested Avalon direct it himself because he knew the subject matter so well. Avalon eventually gave the job to Chris Fraser, a young director who had another project Avalon was going to produce.

The film was shot on 16mm and blown up to 35 mm. Shooting began in October 1976 and took place near Sydney and Newcastle, especially in the town of Catherine Hill Bay.

Avalon invested $25,000 of his own money. He had another investor provide $25,000 plus twelve friends who put in $8,000. This film is also known for marking Mel Gibson's debut in his first leading role.

== Sequels ==
The film had two sequels, Breaking Loose (1988), which is set 20 years later and stars Peter Phelps as Ross Cameron, the son of Boo and Caroline, and Sons of Summer (2023), which is set 30 years later and stars Joe Davidson as Sean, another long-lost son of Boo. However, most of the characters were recast.

| Character | Summer City | Breaking Loose | Sons of Summer |
|---|---|---|---|
| Sandy Harrison | John Jarratt | | Ron Kelly |
| Robbie Atkins | Phillip Avalon | Vince Martin | Phillip Avalon |
| Scollop | Mel Gibson | Phillip Avalon | David E. Woodley |
| Caroline Dixon | Debbie Forman | Sandra Lee Paterson | |
| Helen | Abigail | Abigail | |
