= Money shot (disambiguation) =

A money shot is a particularly expensive or valuable cinematic sequence.

Money shot could also refer to:

== Music ==
- Money Shot (album), the third studio album by the band Puscifer, or the title track
- "Money Shot", a 2004 song by Katastrophy Wife from All Kneel
- "Money Shot", a 2020 song by AC/DC from Power Up

== Television ==
- Money Shot: The Pornhub Story, a 2023 documentary
- "Money Shot" (The Shield), the third episode of the seventh season of The Shield television series
- Xanadu (TV series), a 2011 French television series known as The Money Shot in the US

== Film ==
- Money Shot, a 2003 Australian film, the making of which is documented in 2002's Making Venus

== Other uses ==
- Money shot, a cum shot in adult film
