= 2KA =

Australian radio station

Coordinates: 33.714043°S 150.311589°E

2KA was an Australian radio station, licensed to Katoomba, New South Wales, and serving the Blue Mountains area of western Sydney. It was launched on 7 September 1935.

In December 1937 the station moved from 1160 to 780 kHz. A repeater station on 1480 kHz was added in 1978. From November 1978, the station transmitted on 783 kHz on the AM band, with a translator station on 1476 kHz at Emu Plains.

Before the station launched its Emu Plains-based translator in the late 1970s, it was exclusively a Blue Mountains based licence. The new frequency, 1476 kHz, enabled programmers to extend the audience reach to Penrith, and draw revenue from businesses in the area. To combat the potential damage to their Sydney audiences at the time, a number of Sydney radio stations bought the licence and experimented with various automated technologies, none of which were seriously designed to draw mass audiences.

Australian television personality Mike Walsh bought the license in 1983, and worked to advance his vision of developing a successful business model and innovative entertainment product.

The station, which had been broadcasting from a studio in Borec House, at the corner of Station Street and Henry Street in Penrith, developed a new studio at the intersection of Henry and Lawson Streets. It adjoined a cinema complex, which was also owned by Walsh.

On 26 October 1992 at 13:00 hrs., it converted to the FM band and became One FM, and later 96.1FM. The first song played was Elton John's "The One", followed by Euphoria's "One In A Million and U2's "One". The station had paid just $46,000 to convert to the FM band, which was considered a bargain, noting it covered a considerable area of Sydney, and the record amounts of money being paid by other AM stations to convert to FM.

The license for the station was sold by Walsh in 1997 to the Australian Radio Network (ARN).

The service provided by the original licence (after its conversion from AM to FM) was now known as 9inety-6ix.1, then in 2002 Edge 96.1, then in 2023 CADA.

== 2KA Relaunch ==
In 2021, 2KA was resurrected by Noise FM Pty Ltd, who acquired the callsign from the Australian Communications and Media Authority (ACMA) to relaunch the 2KA brand for their narrowcast radio network covering the Blue Mountains on FM 87.8 and 87.6 MHz. 2KA's test transmissions commenced in late November 2021 and included Christmas Music ahead of an official launch planned for 1 January 2022.

== 2KA Personalities and Roll Call ==
From 1967 until 1993, 2KA broadcast all of the Penrith Panthers rugby league games live. By far the longest serving of the commentators was the late Frank Ley, who broadcast the games from the mid-1970s until his retirement in 1989. David Aldred who called North Queensland Foley Shield Rugby League Football on the ABC and horse racing in Queensland in the early 1980s was a co-commentator with Frank Ley in 1987–1988. Brian Sanders took over the calling from Frank, and appointed former Penrith and Canterbury player Darryl Brohman as his expert analyst. Brohman is now with 2GB's Continuous Call Team.

Former announcers include:

- Peter Hand
- Leon Byner (5AA Adelaide Mornings)
- Ron Casey (deceased)
- Ward Austin (deceased)
- Reg Dowton
- Brian Sanders
- Pete Graham
- Mark Condon
- Kerry Peck
- Richard Mercer
- Shon Walker
- Rob Gooda
- Kerryn Bancs
- Mark Wyman
- Warren Purchase
- John O'Callahan
- Peter Rumble
- Donn Berghofer
- Mike Bedford
- Kerry Denten
- Pete Wagstaff UK
- Keith McGowan (deceased)
- Richard Perno

From 1976 to 1978:

- Malcolm Lees
- Vance Green
- Gerry Hallahan (deceased)
- Ray Grech
- Greg King
- John Bond (Bamborough)
- Rick Page (Manager)
