= Pure Shit =

- DVD release cover from 2010
- Directed by: Bert Deling
- Written by: Bert Deling; Anne Hetherington; Alison Hill; John Hooper; Ricky Kallend; John Laurie; David Shepherd; John Tulip; Bob Weis
- Produced by: Bob Weis
- Starring: Gary Waddell; Anne Hetherington; Carol Porter
- Cinematography: Tom Cowan
- Edited by: John Scott
- Music by: Martin Armiger
- Production company: Apogee Films
- Release dates: 15 August 1975 (Perth International Film Festival); 7 May 1976 (Australia)
- Running time: 83 minutes
- Country: Australia
- Language: English
- Budget: AU$28,000

Pure Shit (censored as Pure S) is a 1975 Australian drama film directed by Bert Deling.

When the film premiered at Melbourne's Playbox in May 1976, the Vice Squad raided the theatre. It was initially banned, then given an R certificate, and the title was changed from Pure Shit to Pure S.

The low-budget film provoked a hostile reaction from the mainstream media on its initial release. It is now considered an "underground" classic.

== Plot summary ==
A young woman dies of a heroin overdose. Four junkies who knew her leave the share house to avoid police, and spend 24 hours searching the streets of Melbourne for good quality heroin and excitement.

== Cast ==
- Gary Waddell as Lou
- Ann Hetherington as Sandy
- Carol Porter as Gerry
- John Laurie as John
- Max Gillies as Dr Harry Wolf
- Tim Robertson as Cop
- Helen Garner as Jo the speed freak
- Phil Motherwell as Ed the coke dealer

== Production ==
The film's budget was partly provided by the Film, Radio and Television Board of the Australia Council and partly by the Buoyancy Foundation, an organisation to help drug takers. Bert Deling says he was particularly influenced by Jean Renoir and Howard Hawks.

Lead actor Garry Waddell says he helped with the script:

It was really good having Bert there because he helped me a lot. If you weren't sure of anything you could always get reassurance from him or the cameraman, Tom Cowan. It wasn't a hard movie to work on because it was so enjoyable. The relationships between people on the film were always good.

Writer Helen Garner has a small role as a speed-addled woman named Jo. Garner starred in the film shortly before she published Monkey Grip (1977), which is set in a similar milieu of communal drug use.

== Release ==
The Commonwealth film censors initially banned the movie but allowed it to be released with an "R" rating provided the title was changed from Pure Shit to Pure S. Deling later said that the film "played two weeks at Melbourne’s Playbox and had a short Sydney run … but very few people got to see it, and we didn’t make a cent from it." The movie was polarising, with the critic of the Herald calling it "the most evil film that I've ever seen" but others such as Bob Ellis championing it.

The film was released on DVD in 2009.

=== Accolades ===
Award	Category	Subject	Result
AACTA Awards (1975 AFI Awards)	Best Film	Bob Weis	Nominated
AACTA Awards (1975 AFI Awards)	Best Direction	Bert Deling	Nominated
AACTA Awards (1975 AFI Awards)	Best Supporting Actress	Helen Garner	Nominated

== See also ==
- Cinema of Australia
