= Mark Jackson (Australian footballer) =

Australian rules footballer, born 1959

Personal information
- Full name: Mark Alexander Jackson
- Nickname: Jacko
- Born: 30 August 1959 (age 67); Melbourne, Victoria, Australia
- Height: 192 cm (6 ft 4 in)
- Weight: 94 kg (207 lb)
- Position: Full forward

Playing career
Years	Club	Games (Goals)
1979	South Fremantle	22 (55)
1980	Richmond Reserves	22 (131)
1981–1982	Melbourne	41 (152)
1983	St Kilda	10 (41)
1984–1986	Geelong	31 (115)
1986	Brunswick	6 (23)
1987	South Fremantle	10 (45)
1987	Kedron	1 (4)
Total		143 (566)

Career highlights
- Melbourne leading goalkicker: 1981; St Kilda leading goalkicker: 1983; Geelong leading goalkicker: 1984; South Fremantle leading goalkicker: 1987

Mark Alexander Jackson (born 30 August 1959) is a former Australian rules footballer who played for the Melbourne Demons, St Kilda Saints and Geelong Cats in the Victorian Football League (VFL), and for the South Fremantle Bulldogs in the West Australian Football League (WAFL).

Known as "Jacko", Jackson's colourful and enigmatic personality often resulted in clashes with officials and teammates, which tended to overshadow the fact that he was also a capable full forward.

Following his football career, Jackson became notable for several television appearances, including commercials for Jenny Craig, Energizer and Nutri-Grain, along with several feature films. Jackson has also written an autobiography, Dumb Like a Fox, which was released in 1986.

== Early life ==
Jackson was born at the Royal Women's Hospital as one of six children to George Jackson and his wife Frances, and grew up in the eastern Melbourne suburb of Nunawading.

== Football career ==
=== South Fremantle & Richmond (1979–1980) ===
After playing colts and reserves football for Richmond in 1977 and 1978, Jackson started his senior career in the West Australian Football League, spending the 1979 season with South Fremantle. Coach Mal Brown employed Jackson as a forward to protect Ray Bauskis, a skilful but lightweight full-forward. Jackson kicked 53 goals in 22 games and Bauskis 66 in 17 games. South Fremantle finished second in 1979. The night before the second semi-final, Jackson returned to Melbourne after being told that the other players had voted him out of the team. He consequently missed out on playing in the 1979 grand final, which saw the then largest crowd in West Australian football history.

Jackson rejoined Richmond for the 1980 season. However, with Michael Roach and Brian Taylor at the club, there was no room for another full forward. Jackson spent the entire 1980 season playing in the reserves and kicked 131 goals.

=== Melbourne (1981–1982) ===
Jackson moved to Melbourne for the 1981 season, coached by Ron Barassi. Jackson performed a handstand in front of the Hawks full back, Kelvin Moore, reportedly after Moore had told him he "wouldn’t be a full forward while his arse pointed to the floor". Jackson on Open Mike said it was not pointed at Moore, rather it was directed at umpire Glenn James after he disputed a decision. Jackson kicked 76 goals in each of his two years with the Demons, leading the goal kicking in 1981 and one goal less than Gerard Healy in 1982.

=== St Kilda (1983) ===
In 1983, Jackson joined St Kilda on a three-year contract believed to have been worth $40,000 per year. He played in the first nine matches (in which the Saints lost the first eight matches in a row) and kicked 40 goals, including 10 in Round 5 against Sydney. However, controversy reared its head again when he was relegated to the reserves for "disciplinary reasons" in Round 10, and then returned for the Round 11 game against Collingwood, where he was held to one goal in a high-scoring 16-point loss. Jackson was again dropped to the reserves, and suffered a bruised chest during the Sunday game. On the Tuesday following that game, the Saints had told Jackson his services were no longer required. It was later revealed that, among other things, he had played a dangerous prank on club legend Trevor Barker by placing a brick behind the brake pedal in his car. He had also placed a lit cigarette butt in the pocket of club chairman Lindsay Fox in the social club.

Jackson spent the remainder of the year playing for the Melbourne Harlequins rugby side. However, his 41 goals was still enough to be the Saints' leading goal kicker for the 1983 season.

=== Geelong (1984–1986) ===
1984 saw Jackson return to the VFL with Geelong. He led their goal kicking in 1984 with 74. In total during his time at Geelong, Jackson scored 115 goals in 31 games.

Geelong started 1985 poorly with one win in the first four rounds but improved with five wins in the next six rounds to be in fifth position. But after losing to Fitzroy in Round 11 they would spend the remainder of the season hovering just outside the Top Five, eventually finishing sixth on the ladder.

The Round 11 match against Hawthorn at Princes Park was overshadowed by various spiteful incidents, including Leigh Matthews' king-hit on Geelong midfielder Neville Bruns behind play, leaving Bruns with a broken jaw. Although this incident was not reported at the time, video footage of the incident resulted in Matthews being charged by Victoria Police with assault and subsequently deregistered by the VFL for four matches. Jackson kicked four goals for the game to be the Cats' main scorer for the day, but was reported four times during the match:

- by boundary umpire Gower, boundary umpire O'Leary, goal umpire Bill Pryde and field umpire Ian Robinson for allegedly striking Gary Ayres in the final quarter;
- by goal umpire Pryde for allegedly striking Chris Langford on two separate occasions during the final quarter;
- by field umpire Robinson for allegedly striking Chris Mew in the final quarter; and
- by field umpire Robinson for allegedly striking Chris Langford in the final quarter.

At the VFL Tribunal hearing on the Monday following the game, Jackson was suspended for a total of eight matches, stemming from outcomes of three of the charges:

- He pleaded guilty to the charge from four umpires of striking Ayres (two-match suspension).
- He pleaded not guilty to striking Mew and was severely reprimanded
- The third charge of striking Langford by goal umpire Pryde was upheld (two-match suspension)
- He pleaded guilty to the fourth charge of striking Langford (four-match suspension).

After kicking six goals in the first round of 1986 and two in the second round, he retired after his omission from the Geelong senior side in the following round. He ended his VFL career with 308 goals from 82 games, leading his club's goalkicking on 3 occasions.

He holds the record for the most consecutive games from debut with at least one goal, with 79 games. His first and only goalless game in his career was in his third-to-last game in Round 21, 1985 against Richmond at VFL Park. Jackson gained a controversial reputation for his on-field antics, and was regularly reported: twice at Melbourne and four times at Geelong, including an eight match suspension following a fight against Hawthorn.

=== Later years ===
An autobiography of Jackson's football career was published in 1986 and titled Jacko, Dumb Like a Fox, written with the assistance of Melbourne journalist Jon Anderson. Later in 1986 he played a few games for Brunswick Football Club in the Victorian Football Association (VFA) First Division, the first of which against Sandringham drew a crowd of nearly 15,000 to Gillon Oval; he was sacked from Brunswick in July after missing training.

Jackson returned to South Fremantle for the 1987 WAFL season, and kicked 45 goals from the opening 10 games. This included nine goals against West Perth in round three. South Fremantle won its opening three games of the season, but then went on an 18-match losing streak to win the wooden spoon – the club's first since 1972. Jackson walked out on the club after round 10, where the Bulldogs lost to West Perth by a league-record 210 points. Despite only playing half the season, he still finished as the club's leading goalkicker. Later in 1987, he went to Queensland and played a game for QAFL club Kedron; he was paid a large fee of $2,000 per game, but his presence drew a large crowd which earned more than $12,000 for the club. He had intended to play more games for Kedron, but was suspended for unbecoming conduct after dropping his shorts several times during the match.

== Singing career ==
Jackson used his fame and popularity to launch a singing career, releasing two singles in 1985. His first single, "I’m an Individual" was a hit on the Australian singles chart. A second single, "Me Brain Hurts" was not so successful. A 1991 release, "You Can Do This", also failed to make an impression.

Jackson combined a rap-like delivery with lyrics based on Australian comedy and larrikinism.

== Acting career ==
After his singing career ended, Jackson began appearing in advertisements, the most successful of which was his role in Energizer battery commercials during the late 1980s and early-mid 1990s. The commercials ended with a manic Jackson yelling "Get Energizer. It’ll surprise you! Oi!". These commercials were shown extensively in the United States, even though few people knew of Jackson, during a period of high American interest in things Australian in the wake of the Crocodile Dundee films. This American infatuation with Australian culture is referenced in The Simpsons episode "Bart vs. Australia" (1995), in which Jackson makes a cameo promoting Energizer. He was the brand's last human spokesman before the emergence of the Energizer Bunny.

There was also a 10 in 1 "Oi! Jacko Gym" action figure toy that could talk, do push ups, lift weights and ride a skateboard—all battery operated, with Jackson wearing the battery company logo on his singlet. He was also linked with Nutri-Grain amongst other companies, and for a time worked as a professional actor for commercials.

Jackson has appeared in various television sitcoms and movies—one of the most notable being as survival expert "Jetto" in the short-lived American action-adventure series The Highwayman (1988)—as well as being on talkback radio and in various children's programs and talk shows. He had a cameo part, as a van driver, in Ted Kotcheff's 1971 film Wake in Fright. During 2005 Jackson embarked on a tour with author and renowned criminal Mark "Chopper" Read.

In 2014, Jackson was featured on 7mate's Bogan Hunters as a celebrity judge.

== Boxing ==
Jackson also appeared in a televised Australian celebrity boxing match in 2002 in which he went up against Australian former rugby league centre Mal Meninga. Jackson was soundly defeated. Jackson had previously beaten Essendon toughman Ron Andrews in a points decision on 10 December 1984 in a six-round boxing match at the Perth Entertainment Centre.

== Filmography ==
- 1990 — Amazing Sports Bloopers
- 1988 – The Highwayman TV Series
- 1994 – Signal One
- 2002 – Trojan Warrior (as Mark Jackson)
- 2008 – Hole in the Wall – Played on "The Beasts" team.

== Discography ==
=== Singles ===
Year	Title	Peak chart positions
1985	I’m an Individual	15
1985	Me Brain Hurts	—
1991	You Can Do This	—
