= Ward Austin =

Australian radio DJ

- Born: Ward Austin Gargan; 2 January 1935; Darlinghurst, New South Wales, Australia
- Died: 18 August 1998 (aged 63); St Ives, New South Wales, Australia
- Occupations: Radio DJ and personality
- Years active: 1960–1995

Ward Austin Gargan (2 January 1935 – 18 August 1998), who worked as Ward "Pally" Austin, was an Australian radio DJ in the 1960s and 1970s. He was known for his unpredictable but popular stints at various stations. Austin was a dedicated music fan of American artists, particularly Elvis Presley, and American South musicians. He provided catchphrases which became part of the 1960s vernacular, "a rickapoodie and a fandooglie", "too much for the human unit" and "anytime you're ready, Pally."

== Biography ==
Ward Austin Gargan was born on 2 January 1935 in the Sydney suburb of Coogee. His father, Vincent Gargan (1905–1994), was a sound engineer, and his mother was Veronica Agnes "Vera" (née Gurney) Gargan (1902–1981). Austin grew up with two siblings and from 1937 the family lived on a rural property at Balldale, 50 kilometres (31 mi) from Albury before moving to North Albury before 1947. In June 1938 he was kicked by a draught horse and hospitalised with facial and leg injuries. He started primary education at the Convent of Mercy, Albury (later incorporated into Xavier High School, Albury) and achieved a pass at preparatory level in music for piano in 1947. The family relocated to Cronulla by 1949. For secondary education he attended, Saint Ignatius' College, Riverview, although, "it wasn't my scene, not my groove."

While a secondary student, Austin was in the audience at radio station 2UE's afternoon live shows, including visiting Welsh singer, Donald Peers. He started a commercial art course at East Sydney Tech (later became National Art School) but left to start work as an interior decorator. Austin moved to Vancouver, first as a decorator. However, by 1955 he worked for Canadian Pacific Railway in a switching yard. He spent a year visiting America and Mexico before returning to Australia. He trained as a radio announcer at 2KY before stints in various regional stations in New South Wales, including 2KA in Katoomba in 1960. As Ward Austin, he returned to Sydney and worked at 2UE from 1961. He was sacked by the station's management for irreverent on-air comments and moved to 2UW in 1964. He became one of Sydney's most popular radio DJs of the late 1960s.

Austin supported Australian acts and helped their singles achieve airplay. During 1969 he collaborated with independent producer Martin Erdman, who recorded demo tapes for over 150 bands for 2UW's New UW New Sounds of 69 promotion. The best of these tapes received high rotation, and resulted in a concert showcasing the most popular artists. Austin was sacked from 2UW for asking, "how would you like something hot and throbbing between your legs?" when advertising motor bikes. His off-air behaviour was also controversial: he was raided by police for possessing unlicensed firearms: they confiscated his Remington revolver, he participated in a nightclub brawl with comedian Joe Martin, and, in March 1970, he allegedly made racist remarks to Sammy Davis Jr. After the latter incident, Dita Cobb "tried to tip a bucket of ice over his head." Consequently, he was fired from 2UW.

Ward moved to New Zealand in 1971 and worked for Radio Hauraki. In the following year he relocated to America and applied for permanent residency. He obtained a job at KXIV, Phoenix, Arizona, where "they were only telling me how much I was mutilating the pronunciation of some American Indian words." In February 1974 he returned to Radio Hauraki for a year and then back to America to work in Los Angeles, providing voice-overs. Austin returned to 2UW in 1975, whilst on holidays in Sydney. Austin appeared as himself in the Australian beach-based feature film, Summer City (1977), alongside Mel Gibson in one of his first roles. He remained at 2UW until 1980, when he was sacked, "for economic reasons." During the late 1970s, his flamboyant style and personality fell out of favour; generally more music was played and less "patter" required. He successively worked for 2UE, 2WS and 2CH, he "gradually faded from view in the '80s" before retiring in the 1990s.

Besides "Pally", Austin's other nicknames were "Baby", "White Knight", "Confederate Cowboy" and "Peter Pan of the Airwaves". He developed an outgoing, fun and left of centre style. He could also be difficult, unpredictable and occasionally out of control. His behaviour caused troubled relationships with management, which resulted in his being sacked and relocating to another station. Ward developed catchphrases, which became part of the 1960s vernacular, "a rickapoodie and a fandooglie", "too much for the human unit" and "anytime you're ready, Pally."

== Personal life ==
Ward Austin married Anne McGrath in 1958, they divorced in April 1965. The couple had a son, Dean, and a granddaughter, Amy. He married Irene Combe (born 1951), his second wife, on 21 June 1968, when she was 17 and he was 33. They had met three years earlier and he proclaimed his love for her. Combe was a fashion model from 1967 to 1986. Austin and Combe were divorced in about 1994.

Austin's last public statement was in The Daily Telegraph in 1996, when he explained why he had undergone penile implant surgery:

"I was born in January 1935, the same month and the same year as Elvis Presley and my old mate, Johnny O'Keefe. The difference is that Elvis and Johnny are dead. But after all the booze, all the late nights and all the cigarettes, the Pally is still alive ... I'm not living with anyone now but I would like to resume an active sex life, which I plan to do as soon as possible."

In 1998 he had a severe fall, down his stairs at home, brought on by alcoholism. Five days later he was discovered by neighbours. Austin died on 18 August 1998 in St Ives. His funeral's theme was Americana and included an Elvis impersonator at the graveside, Macquarie Park Cemetery and Crematorium.
