= Case for the Defence =

1978 Australian television series

- Written by: Anne Brooksbank; Bob Ellis; Tony Morphett; Ron McLean
- Starring: John Hamblin
- Country of origin: Australia
- Original language: English
- No. of episodes: 9

Production
- Producer: Reg Grundy Organisation
- Running time: 90 mins

Original release
- Release: 1978

Case for the Defence is a 1978 Australian legal TV series. It starred John Hamblin as Sydney defence lawyer John Case and Judith Arthy as Winsome Blake. Supporting cast were Max Osbiston as Proudfoot, Edward Howell as Wheems and Robert 'Tex' Morton as Rupe Case.

== Cast ==
=== Main / regular ===
- John Hamblin as John Case
- Judith Arthy as Winsome Blake
- Max Osbiston as Proudfoot
- Edward Howell as Wheems
- Robert 'Tex' Morton as Rupe Case
- Kevin Miles as Fulstrom
- Trevor Kent as The Rabbi
- John Waters as Steve Gray

=== Guests ===
- Angela Punch McGregor as Ruth (1 episode)
- Anne Haddy as Mary (1 episode)
- Barry Otto as Doctor
- Belinda Giblin as Terri Simpson (1 episode)
- Ben Gabriel as Edward Freeman (1 episode)
- Betty Lucas as Fiona Malcolm (1 episode)
- Brian Moll as The Judge
- Bruce Spence as Alfred (2 episodes)
- Bud Tingwell as George McGee (1 episode)
- Elizabeth Alexander as Jean (1 episode)
- Enid Lorimer as Mrs Latimer (1 episode)
- Harold Hopkins as Theo Lambrakis (1 episode)
- Joanne Samuel as Amy (1 episode)
- John Meillon as Robert Lattimer (1 episode)
- Kevin Miles as Fulstrom (1 episode)
- Lorna Lesley as The Receptionist (1 episode)
- Lorraine Bayly as Sister Barrett (1 episode)
- Peter Whitford as Institution Director (1 episode)
