= I'm an Individual =

Single by Mark "Jacko" Jackson
- Released: 18 March 1985
- Songwriter: Robert Alexander Brown

Mark "Jacko" Jackson singles chronology
"I'm an Individual" (1985)	"My Brain Hurts" (1985)

"I'm an Individual" is a novelty song released by former Australian football player Mark "Jacko" Jackson in March 1985. Described as "a shouty rap", it reached number 15 nationally on the Australian popular music charts, and number two on the Victorian state chart.

A follow-up single by Jackson, "Me Brain Hurts", was also released but did not achieve the same success.

Fellow Australian football full-forward Warwick Capper is reputed to have recorded the single "I Only Take What's Mine" as a result of the success of "I'm an Individual". The music video for "I Only Take What's Mine" includes footage of Capper throwing darts at a picture of Jackson.

The song was featured in the 2012 play Barassi: The Stage Show.

== Track listing ==
Standard single
No.	Title	Writer(s)	Length
1.	"I’m an Individual"	Robert Alexander Brown

== Charts ==
Chart (1985)	Peak position
Australia (Kent Music Report)	15
