= Terra Nova (1998 film) =

Australian film directed by Paul Middleditch

- Directed by: Paul Middleditch
- Written by: Martin Edmond, Paul Middleditch
- Starring: Jeanette Cronin; Angela Punch McGregor
- Release date: 1998
- Country: Australia
- Language: English
- Box office: A$20,000 (Australia)

Terra Nova is a 1998 Australian film directed by Paul Middleditch and starring Jeanette Cronin and Angela Punch McGregor. The whole story is based on a young woman (Jeanette Cronin) who runs away from her home in New Zealand and hides with her child in an Australian boarding house named Terra Nova.

== Cast ==
- Jeanette Cronin as Ruth
- Angela Punch McGregor as Margie
- Paul Kelman as Simon
- Ritchie Singer as Rob
- Gillian Jones as Emily
- Vincent Gil as Hugh
- Teo Gebert as Warren
