= Watch the Shadows Dance =

- Written by: Michael McGennan
- Directed by: Mark Joffe
- Starring: Tom Jennings; Nicole Kidman; Joanne Samuel; Vince Martin; Craig Pearce
- Music by: Dave Skinner
- Countries of origin: Australia; United States
- Original language: English

Production
- Producer: James M. Vernon
- Production company: Cine-Funds Limited

Original release
- Release: 1988

Watch the Shadows Dance, also known as Nightmaster, is a 1988 action film directed by Mark Joffe and starring Tom Jennings, Nicole Kidman, Joanne Samuel, Vince Martin and Craig Pearce.

== Plot ==
A tight-knit group of high school students studies karate with Steve Beck (Vince Martin), a former soldier in an unnamed war. They begin working at 5:00 a.m., which makes them sleepy in Sonia Spane's (Joanne Samuel) class. Spane is Beck's former lover, and she complains to him about the relentless schedule of his classes. Beck's students also engage in a mock war game at night, which is held in a factory. The losers get tagged with a fluorescent dye on their faces. When Spane sees the dye on a student's face, she interrogates them about the game, which they call "kuma".

In addition to playing kuma at night, the students all hang out at a local bar. One of their fellow students, Guy Duncan (Craig Pearce), is a drugdealer who lurks on the periphery of their classes with Beck and at the bar. Robby Mason (Tom Jennings) is Beck's prize pupil, and the two are training intensively for a televised kickboxing tournament. During the course of his training, Robby grows closer to his classmate Amy Raphael (Nicole Kidman).

Because Spane was previously involved with Beck, she knows his intensity could be overwhelming for their young students. Beck is the only surviving member of his platoon, and he believes that he has stayed alive through the traits of discipline and determination that he is passing on to his students.

One day, Amy overhears Beck purchasing drugs from Duncan. Just before the kickboxing tournament, Robby spies on Duncan and Beck. Duncan tries to blackmail Beck into paying a higher price for his drugs. Beck kills Duncan with one blow to the face. A short time later, when they face each other in the kickboxing ring, Robby confronts Beck about killing Duncan.

After the tournament, Beck tries to run Robby over with his car. The two later confront each other in the factory during a kuma. The other students realize the truth about Beck, and they team up to keep him from killing Robby. Beck and Robby end up dangling over a large height together. Seeing the police gathered below, Beck lets go of Robby and falls to his death.

== Cast ==
- Tom Jennings as Robby Mason
- Nicole Kidman as Amy Gabriel
- Joanne Samuel as Sonia Spane
- Vince Martin as Steve Beck
- Craig Pearce as Guy Duncan
- Doug Parkinson as Pete 'Pearly' Gates
- Jeremy Shadlow as Simon
- Alex Broun as Henry
- Christopher Truswell as 'Fingers' Hough
- Sean Garlick as Stave Opponent
- Paul Kelly as Singer
