= Gary Waddell =

Australian actor (1952–2026)

- Born: 7 August 1952; Carlton, Victoria, Australia
- Died: 12 October 2026 (aged 74)
- Occupation: Actor
- Years active: 1974–2026
- Notable work: Pure Shit (1975); The King is Dead! (2012)
- Children: 1

Gary Waddell (7 August 1952 – 12 October 2026) was an Australian film and television actor. He primarily worked as a character actor, portraying gritty or unconventional figures in supporting roles across Australian film and television.

== Early life and career ==
Waddell was born in Carlton, Victoria, on 7 August 1952. He appeared in the 1975 drama film Pure Shit, receiving an AFI Award for his portrayal of Lou, a drug addict. The film was initially banned, but was subsequently released with an "R" rating, provided the title was changed from Pure Shit to Pure S.

He also appeared alongside Bruce Spence in the 1976 cult film Oz: A Rock'n’Roll Road Movie, playing the part of the cowardly biker (The Lion). The film was an Australian reimagining of The Wizard of Oz and was marketed towards a mid-1970s youth audience.

The following year, Waddell had a role in The FJ Holden (1977) with Sigrid Thornton. Further film credits from this era include the 1978 film In Search of Anna, with Chris Haywood and Bill Hunter, and the 1980 prison drama Stir opposite Bryan Brown and Max Phipps.

Waddell later had a role in the 2000 crime film Chopper, where he played Kevin Darcy opposite Eric Bana in his award-winning portrayal of Mark "Chopper" Read. His subsequent film credits include Dirty Deeds (2002) with Bryan Brown, Gettin' Square (2003) alongside Sam Worthington and David Wenham. and 2002 political drama Black and White with Colin Friels, Charles Dance and Robert Carlyle.

In 2002, Waddell was nominated for an Australian Film Institute (AFI) Award for Best Actor in a Supporting or Guest Role in a Television Drama, for his role as Steve McClure in an episode of Bad Cop, Bad Cop. He was later nominated for the 2012 AACTA Award for Best Actor in a Supporting Role, for portraying the neighbour from hell in Rolf de Heer's 2012 comedy drama film The King is Dead!. The following year, he featured in the film Charlie's Country as Gaz.

In 2014, Waddell appeared opposite Bryan Brown and Sam Neill in the eight-part drama series Old School.

He later had a role in the 2022 psychological crime thriller The Stranger opposite Joel Edgerton and Sean Harris.

== Personal life and death ==
Waddell's partner was Lou Morris, with whom he had a daughter. The couple moved to Bangalow from Sydney in 2013 after their daughter completed her university studies and moved out of home.

Waddell died after a long illness on 12 October 2026 at the age of 74.

== Awards ==
Year	Work	Award	Category	Result	Ref.
1975	Pure Shit	AFI Award		Won	
2002	Bad Cop, Bad Cop (Episode 8: "Yesterday's Zero")	Australian Film Institute Award	Best Actor in a Supporting or Guest Role in a Television Drama	Nominated	
2012	The King is Dead!	AACTA Award	AACTA Award for Best Actor in a Supporting Role	Nominated	
2013	The King is Dead!	Australian Film Critics Award (AFCA)	Best Supporting Actor	Won	

== Filmography ==
=== Television ===
Year	Title	Role	Notes	Ref.
1977	Bluey	Terry Baxter / Davidson	2 episodes	
1978	Cop Shop	Harry Dunne	1 episode	
1983	Scales of Justice	Jimmy	Miniseries, 1 episode	
1986	The Blue Lightning	Hennessey	TV movie	
1987	The Facts of Life Down Under	Hugo	TV movie	
1988	True Believers		Miniseries, 2 episodes	
1992	E Street	Bill O'Reilly	1 episode	
1992–1994	G.P.	Wayne / Rocco	2 episodes	
1993	Seven Deadly Sins		Miniseries, 1 episode	
1994	Heartland	Lennie	Miniseries	
1994	Cody: The Tipoff	Mack	TV movie	
1996–2000	Water Rats	Billy Pope / Tom Haxby	3 episodes	
1998	Blue Heelers	Mike Thompson	1 episode	
1998–2004	Stingers	Gerry Gallagher / Frank Mornain	2 episodes	
2001	SeaChange	Foreman	2 episodes	
2001	All Saints	Macca	1 episode	
2002	Bad Cop, Bad Cop	Steve McClure	2 episodes	
2006	Two Twisted	Jimmy Kitchen	Miniseries, 1 episode	
2007	Joanne Lees: Murder in the Outback	Vince	TV movie	
2007	Chandon Pictures	Dean	2 episodes	
2007–2009	Home and Away	Terry Mitchell	4 episodes	
2008	Scorched	Nick	TV movie	
2008	Infamous Victory: Ben Chifley’s Battle for Coal	Union Leader	TV movie	
2009	A Model Daughter: The Killing of Caroline Byrne	Mick Bruvette	TV movie	
2010–2016	Rake	Epis / Harley	3 episodes	
2011	City Homicide	Bruno Lilley	1 episode	
2011	Killing Time	Anthony Farrell	1 episode	
2014	Old School	Ken	1 episode	
2014	Lessons from the Grave	Barry Brown	Season 1, 1 episode	
2020	Upright	Weary	1 episode	

=== Films ===
Year	Title	Role	Notes	Ref.
1975	Pure Shit	Lou		
1976	Oz	Guitarist / Bikie		
1977	The FJ Holden	"Deadlegs"		
1977	Blue Fire Lady	Charlie		
1978	In Search of Anna	Maxie		
1980	Stir	Dave		
1982	Heatwave	Florist Messenger		
1982	The Highest Honor	Corporal R.B. Fletcher		
1982	Monkey Grip	Actor 3		
1988	Grievous Bodily Harm	Eddie Weaks		
1988	Breaking Loose	Cop		
1989	Tripe	Sonny Jim	Short film	
1989	The Killing of Angelo Tsakos		Short film	
1991	Sweet Talker	"Bluey"		
1992	Prey of the Chameleon	Newscaster		
1993	Shotgun Wedding	Nighclub Spruiker		
1996	Dr. Ice	Newscaster		
1997	Heaven's Burning	Motel Manager		
1997	Maslin Beach	Ben		
1999	Freeze		Short film	
2000	Chopper	Kevin Darcy		
2002	Black and White	Constable Jones		
2002	Dirty Deeds	Freddie		
2003	Gettin' Square	Dennis Obst		
2003	Lennie Cahill Shoots Through	Terry		
2005	Man-Thing	Cajun Pilot		
2005	The Proposition	Officer Davenport		
2005	Trapped	Smith	Short film	
2007	Almost	Charlie		
2008	Shot Open		Short film	
2008	Night Train		Short film	
2010	Kissing Point	Frank Booth	Short film	
2012	The King is Dead!	King		
2013	Charlie's Country	Gaz		
2014	Blood Pulls a Gun	Jethro Hyam	Short film	
2014	Butcherbird	"Handsome"	Short film	
2016	The Tail Job	The Wharfie		
2022	The Stranger	WA Head		
2022	The Survival of Kindness	Sick Man		

== Theatre ==
Year	Title	Role	Notes	Ref.
1974	The Sports Show / The Migrant Show / The Owl and the Pussycat Show		Melbourne with APG	
1977	Sadie and Neco		La Mama, Melbourne	
1977	Laughing Bantam: Revival		La Mama, Melbourne	
1981	Teeth 'n' Smiles	Inch	Nimrod Theatre, Sydney	
1996	Terminus		Red Shed Theatre, Adelaide	
2000	The Marriage of Figaro		Sydney Opera House with Company B Belvoir	
