= Jon Anderson (journalist) =

Australian sports journalist

Jon Anderson (born 9 August 1958) is a sports journalist with the Herald Sun newspaper, Fox Sports Australia and radio station 3AW.

Known as "Ando", he is well known for appearing in a Herald Sun segment called "At the Bar with Robbo and Ando". He also wrote a column in 1993 that publicised the nickname "FIGJAM" for Nathan Buckley.

Anderson has also written, co-written, or edited books on Mark "Jacko" Jackson, Gary Ablett Sr., Rodney Hogg, and Brian Taylor

In April 2010, Anderson was arrested and charged for driving under the influence and careless driving after reversing his car through the back of a pizza shop. He was recorded with a blood alcohol limit of .139. Following this incident, Anderson's "At the Bar with Robbo and Ando" column was dropped.
