= Bert Deling =

Bert Deling (1 December 1942 – 14 December 2022) was an Australian writer, script editor and director of film and TV best known for the cult classic Pure Shit (1975).

== Select Credits ==
- Dalmas (1973)
- Pure Shit (1975)
- Dead Easy (1982)
- Keiron: The First Voyager (1985)
