= Kirby's Company =

1977 Australian television soap opera

- Genre: Drama
- Written by: Judith Bell, Don Catchlove, Margaret Kelly, Charles Stamp
- Directed by: James Roberts, Chris Thomson, Sue Willis, David Cahill, Michael Carson
- Composer: Bob Barnard
- Country of origin: Australia
- Original language: English
- No. of seasons: 1
- No. of episodes: 18

Production
- Producer: John Martin

Original release
- Release: 19 September 1977 – 16 January 1978

Kirby's Company is an Australian television drama series which first screened on the ABC in 1977. It follows the story of three generations of males in the Kirby family. It was written by Don Catchlove and directed by David Cahill.

== Cast ==
- Margaret Nelson as Pamela Kirby
- Ken Blackburn as Bill Kirby
- Vince Martin as Jimmy Kirby
- Margaret Cruickshank as Judy Kirby
- Edward Ogden as George Kirby
- Tom Burlinson as Peter Kirby
- Bunney Brooke as Maisie Peters
- Louise Howitt as Jennifer Kirby
- Peter De Salis as Owen Kirby
- Willie Fennell as Santa
- Olivia Brown as Ingrid Neilson
- Don Barkham as Jack Clough
- Christine Cameron
- Richard Moir
- Grant Dodwell
