= Class of '74 =

1974 Australian TV soap opera

- Developed by: Reg Grundy Organisation
- Starring: Leonard Teale; John Hamblin; Gordon Glenwright
- Opening theme: Brian Cadd
- Country of origin: Australia
- No. of episodes: 290 x 30 minute episodes

Production
- Running time: 30 minutes (with adverts)

Original release
- Network: Seven Network
- Release: 18 March 1974 – 1975

Class of '74 (and subsequently Class of '75) is a soap opera that screened on the Seven Network in Australia and produced by Reg Grundy Organisation, with Peter Maxwell as EP and sometime director, the series was created by John Edwards, a former employee of Crawford Productions and devised by Alan Coleman and broadcast in black-and-white starting March 1974. Marist Singers of Eastwood provided back-up singing for the school choir.

The series was set at a fictional secondary school called a Waratah High School with its characters being a mix of teachers, staff and students. The series was aimed at a teenage audience. Running for 290 x 30 minutes episodes; five episodes each week were broadcast, stripped across week nights in an early evening 7pm timeslot. The series was renamed Class of '75 for its second and final year. Although originally produced in black and white, it switched to colour broadcasting during its second year of production.

== Main cast ==
=== Teachers, staff and adults ===
Actor	Character
Leonard Teale	as Mr. Charles Ogilvy - School Principal
John Hamblin	Mr. Donald Blair - Deputy Principal
Gordon Glenwright	Hubbard (janitor)
Jeanie Drynan	Mary Dunstan
Vince Martin	Gary Evans / Jack Christiansen
Jan Kingsbury	Maureen Blair
Chuck Danskin	Glen Turner
Allan Lander	Father Paul Kennedy
Carol Vincent-Smythe	Barbara Young
Phillip Ross	David Willard
Judy Ferris	Ruth Howard
Edward Howell	James Findlay

=== Students ===
Actor	Character
John Diedrich	Barry Collins
Anne Louise Lambert	Peggy Richardson
Megan Williams	Ann Watson
Joanne Samuel	Sue Taylor
Carla Hoogeveen	Julie Armstrong
Kevin Wilson	John Ward
Chris Cummings	Greg Simpson
Barbara Llewellyn	Nora Hayes
Adrian Bernotti	Tony Bianco
Terry Peck	
Sharon Higgins	Jackie Howard
Greg Bepper	Dean Howard

=== Miscellaneous ===
Actor	Character
Anne Charleston	Faith Adam
Abigail	Angelique Dupree
Peta Toppano	Gina Ferrari
Briony Behets	Jorja Jones
Peter Bensley	Dennis Braithwaite
Angela Punch-McGregor	Jane Potter
Marty Rhone	Tom Carter
Peter Flett	Rick Harris
Bronwyn Winter	Loretta Day
Patrick Ward	Sam Wandsworth

Cast members Teale, Hamblin and Glenwright continued the program's entire run.

== See also ==
- List of Australian television series
