= Bad Cop, Bad Cop =

- Genre: Comedy
- Created by: Ian David
- Written by: Ian David
- Directed by: Cate Shortland; David Caesar
- Starring: Michael Caton; Daniel Wyllie; Helen Thomson; Chris Hobbs
- Country of origin: Australia
- Original language: English
- No. of seasons: 1
- No. of episodes: 8

Production
- Producer: Ian David
- Production locations: Sydney, New South Wales, Australia
- Running time: 26 minutes
- Production company: Southern Star Entertainment

Original release
- Network: ABC
- Release: 18 November 2002 – 6 January 2003

Bad Cop, Bad Cop is a 2002 Australian television series produced by the Australian Broadcasting Corporation and Southern Star, directed by David Caesar.

== Cast ==
=== Main / regular ===
- Michael Caton as Detective Red Lilywhite
- Dan Wyllie as Detective Constable Lou Knutt
- Helen Thomson as lawyer Tracy Lafever
- Chris Hobbs as Slim Azzopardi

=== Guests ===
- Angela Punch McGregor as Evelyn Bowers (1 episode)
- Gary Waddell as Steve McClure (2 episodes)
- Garry McDonald as Howard Mayes (1 episode)
- John Adam as Tony Mahler (1 episode)
- John Batchelor as Uncle Dan (1 episode)
- Patrick Ward as Reardon (1 episode)
- Roy Billing as Assistant Commissioner 'Pud' Tugwell (2 episodes)
- Sarah Chadwick as Deborah Sidebottom (1 episode)

== Premise ==
The series is a black comedy about two utterly corrupt police officers Lilywhite and Knutt (the "bad cop, bad cop" of the title). Lafever is their friend, a lawyer with a relaxed attitude to the goings on. Police graft, corruption and brutality are satirised in a very dry comic fashion, and with a stream of matter-of-fact obscenities. The series is shot in the eastern suburbs of Sydney, with Lilywhite and Knutt often seen drinking at the Clovelly Bowling Club and numerous references to Maroubra.

The title is a reference to the tactic of good cop, bad cop; though in this case both cops are as bad as each other.

== Episodes ==
1. Here Comes the Son – 18 November 2002 – w Ian David d David Caesar
2. He Who Slips on Milkshakes – 25 November 2002 – w Ian David d David Caesar
3. The Loaded Dog – 2 December 2002 – w Ian David d Cate Shortland
4. The Ex, Lies and Sticky Tape – 9 December 2002 – w Tim Gooding d Cate Shortland
5. Turn Me on Deadman – 16 December 2002 – w Ian David d David Caesar
6. Suit Yourself – 23 December 2002 – w Angela Webber d Cate Shortland
7. A Joint Venture – 30 December 2002 – w Ian David d David Caesar
8. Yesterday's Zero – 6 January 2003 – w Ian David d Cate Shortland
