= The Highwayman (TV series) =

- Created by: Glen A. Larson; Douglas Heyes
- Starring: Sam J. Jones; "Jacko"; Jane Badler; Tim Russ
- Narrated by: William Conrad (uncredited)
- Composers: Rocky Davis; Dave Fisher; Stu Phillips (pilot only)
- Country of origin: United States
- Original language: English
- No. of episodes: Pilot + 9 episodes

Production
- Executive producer: Glen A. Larson
- Producers: Mark McClafferty; Mark Jones; Scott Levitta
- Running time: 60 minutes
- Production companies: Twentieth Century Fox Television (pilot); New West Entertainment (series)

Original release
- Network: NBC
- Release: September 20, 1987 – May 6, 1988

The Highwayman is an American action-adventure-themed television series starring Sam J. Jones, set in "the near future". It was created by Glen A. Larson and Douglas Heyes. The pilot aired in September 1987 and was followed by a series of nine episodes, with significant changes to the cast and format, that ran from March until May 1988.

Opening narration by William Conrad (all episodes after the pilot):

There is a world, just beyond now, where reality runs a razor-thin seam between fact and possibility; where the laws of the present collide with the crimes of tomorrow. Patrolling these vast outlands is a new breed of lawman, guarding the fringes of society’s frontiers, they are known simply as ‘Highwaymen’... and this is their story...

== Synopsis ==
The film and subsequent series follow the adventures of "The Highwayman", one of a mysterious group conducting crime-fighting missions and solving bizarre mysteries. Each Highwayman in this group is equipped with a high-tech, multi-function truck.

The pilot movie used a different opening narration voiced by William Conrad:

They say he came into this world from someplace off the clock.
And his mother was an ice-cold wind, and his father was a fiery rock.
It's told that on some starless nights, his rig could up and glow,
And folks who say they saw it coming swear they didn't see it go.
Now you hear a lot of legends told when you ride the long, hard slab.
From some who say the man is good and some who say he's bad.
But all agreed: who've ever tried to play a cheating' hand?
You only get one chance to draw against "The Highwayman."

Most crimes in our society begin or end on some stretch of road, where laws often terminate at county lines. Combatting these legal blackouts is a new breed of lawman; working the fringes of society's frontiers, and known simply as Highwaymen. This is the story—and the legend—of one such man: The Highwayman.

The 1987 pilot film starred Sam J. Jones. The lead character is more mysterious than any of the other Highwaymen in that his real name is never revealed (he is only known as "The Highwayman" or "Highway"). He drives a large, black, computerized truck with a bullet-shaped cabin, which is the nose of a concealed helicopter (an Aérospatiale Gazelle) that can detach from the rest of the truck. The truck can also operate in "stealth mode" to become invisible. A concealed futuristic sports car (a Lotus Esprit) can emerge from the truck's rear.

Claudia Christian co-starred as the Highwayman's liaison, Dawn, and Stanford Egi as technical wizard Mr. Toto. The pilot was re-titled Terror on the Blacktop when shown as a stand-alone TV film.

After the 1987 pilot film, only Jones returned for the weekly series. The retooling premises eliminated the truck's stealth mode, which was never mentioned again. The Highwayman was joined by a new sidekick, Australian outback survival expert Jetto, played by Mark "Jacko" Jackson; Jane Badler as the Highwayman's boss, Ms. Tania Winthrop; and Tim Russ as D.C. Montana, who was responsible for the maintenance and modifications to the vehicles. The Highwayman was filmed entirely on location in the American Southwest. Unusually, the show even switched production companies (the pilot was the last co-production between Glen Larson Productions and Twentieth Century Fox Television, the series was independently produced by Larson's New West Entertainment).

After Jetto's truck, which was identical to the Highwayman's, was destroyed in the first episode, "Road Ranger", he is given his own, unique truck, the front half of which can separate into a futuristic car. The truck was later used in the first episode of Power Rangers Time Force.

The original Highwayman truck (the one with the Gazelle helicopter cab) was designed and built by Jon Ward. Jetto's truck with the detachable Peterbilt tractor was put for the sale in the 2020s.

== Cast ==
- Sam J. Jones as The Highwayman (a.k.a. "Highway")
- Claudia Christian as Dawn (pilot only)
- Stanford Egi as Mister Toto (pilot only)
- Mark "Jacko" Jackson as "Jetto" (credited on-screen as simply "Jacko")
- Jane Badler as Ms. Tania Winthrop
- Tim Russ as D.C. Montana
- William Conrad as the Narrator (uncredited)

== Episodes ==
Note, one episode was shown out of its intended order. It is listed here in the intended order with explanatory notes.

Production number order, reflecting the order that the episodes began filming, does not match either the actual nor the intended airing order.

No.	Title	Directed by	Written by	Original release date	Prod. code
Pilot	"The Highwayman" a.k.a. Terror on the Blacktop"	Douglas Heyes	Glen A. Larson and Douglas Heyes	September 20, 1987	5L79
The mysterious Highwayman becomes involved when a biker gang called ‘The Bullets’ rob a small-town bank, with their leader, Bo Ziker, ending up in jail. But it emerges that The Bullets were set up to take the fall for a huge fraud instigated by a local bigwig and the town sheriff... This Pilot film was later re-titled "Terror on the Blacktop" and shown as a stand-alone movie. A two-part syndicated version also exists. Special Guest Star: Jimmy Smits (Bo Ziker). Guest Stars: Wings Hauser (Sheriff Wyatt), Jennifer Runyon (Amanda Merrick), Lyle Alzado (Iron Butt), Roddy Piper (Preacher), Ken Morrison (Travis Ziker), Theresa Saldana (Angela Brown), Bill McKinney, Jon Menick and G. Gordon Liddy (Ed Merrick). Co-starring: John Quade (Bartender), Paul Drake (Deputy Bricker), Tommy Lamey (Deputy Dogget), Branscombe Richmond (Geronimo), Michael Berryman (Chromedome), Mickey Jones (Pepper Hansen), Michael Carr (Deputy Turley), Keith Barbour (Entertainer), Patrick Cranshaw (Old Duffer), Maura Soden (Reporter), Jack Ging (head of Stealth, uncredited).
1	"Road Lord"	Dan Haller	Glen A. Larson & Mark Jones	March 4, 1988	8803
When Steve, a fellow Highwayman, is murdered, his friend Highway investigates, and uncovers some sinister goings on at a local, secretive production complex. But Highway is shocked to find Steve there seemingly alive; and now, something is very different about him... The title of this episode is not shown on screen, the only episode of the series not to do so. Some sources give "Road Ranger" as the title, as it is Steve's nickname, but "Road Lord" is the title given in the copyright filing. Guest Starring: Clarence Williams III (Jessie), Anne Lockhart (Battlestar: Galactica) (Shelly North), Clyde Kusatsu, George McDaniel, George Mudock (Doc North), Darby Hinton, Jesse Dizon. Special Guest Star: Kent McCord (Battlestar: Galactica 1980) (Steve North, aka "Road Ranger").
2	"The Hitchhiker"	Larry Shaw	Glen A. Larson	March 11, 1988	8802
The Highwayman is assigned to transport a supposedly dead alien body from a U.F.O. crash site to a research lab. But a reporter is determined to find out what is going on - and the alien is far from dead... Special Guest Star: Cristina Raines (Pepper McKenzie). Guest Starring: Joe Regalbuto (Street Hawk) (Major Fury), James Staley, Robert DoQui, Wendie Malick, and Arlen Dean Snyder (General Nordhoff).
3	"'Til Death Duel Us Part"	Larry Shaw	Jonathan Day and Steven L. Sears & Burt Pearl	March 18, 1988	8805
Highway breaks Cody Teague, his friend and mentor from Vietnam, out of prison for stealing an armored car, of which Highway is certain he is innocent. Now both of them are fugitives, and a number of parties - including Jetto - are after them as they search for the evidence to prove Cody's innocence... Special Guest Star: Chad Everett (Ron Bonham). Guest Starring: Joseph Bottoms (Cody Teague).
4	"Haunted Highway"	Don Weis	Story by : William Rabkin & Lee Goldberg; Teleplay by : William Rabkin & Lee Goldberg and Burt Pearl & Steven L. Sears.	May 6, 1988	8804
When an American Indian is accused of murder, Highway and Jetto investigate and stumble onto a long-forgotten gold mine, and an ancient curse "of fire and ice", which will kill anybody who tries to mine there... This episode was originally scheduled for March 25, 1988 but was postponed, and was eventually aired after all the other episodes (although it is referred to in "Frightmare", confirming that it takes place earlier.) Guest Starring: Marla Heasley (The A-Team) (Liz Redstone), Paul Koslo, Rodger Gibson (Jake Redstone), Michael Horse (Sheriff Jerry New Eagle), Dehl Berti, Gary Grubbs (Harrison), Tim Rossovich, Andy Romano, Jean-Pierre Dorleac, And as Snyder, Steven Keats.
5	"Summer of 45" a.k.a. "1945""	Rob Bowman	Story by : Glen A. Larson & Mark Jones; Teleplay by : Mark Jones and Steven L. Sears & Burt Pearl.	April 1, 1988	8806
Highway and Jetto travel back in time to 1945, to rescue Ms. Winthrop, who has not returned after pursuing a twisted genius who is intent on ending the atomic age before it has even begun... Tim Russ (D.C. Montana) does not appear in this episode. This is the only episode not to feature Highway's truck; Jetto's truck is used throughout. Special Guest Star: Lloyd Bochner. Guest Starring: Bill Hudson (Donald Travers), Greg Mullavey (Edward Travers), Liz Keifer (Leslie), Patrick St. Esprit, Les Brown Jr., Nick Young.
6	"Send in the Clones"	Allan Holzman	Glen A. Larson and David Garber & Bruce E. Kalish	April 8, 1988	8811
Highway befriends a strange but friendly man called Mac, who is promptly snatched away by the Army. Investigating just what is going on, Highway and Jetto discover that Mac is a clone, programmed with a deadly assignment... This episode doubled as a pilot for a proposed spin-off series, "McClone", which was never produced. Guest Starring: J.D. Cannon (Chief Clifton), Terry Carter (Lt. Broadside), Pamela Susan Shoop (Dr. Chadway), Gary Lockwood (Colonel Westcourt), Greta Blackburn (prostitute), Michael Pataki (Detective), and Howie Long (Mac).
7	"Billionaire Body Club"	Ivan Nagy	Glen A. Larson	April 15, 1988	8801
When a dead body drained of blood and missing organs is uncovered, Highway and Jetto are sent in to investigate, and are soon on the trail of a blood-thirsty doctor trading in spare body parts for the rich and the powerful... Special Appearance: Christopher McDonald (Joshua Towler). Guest Starring: Cindy Morgan (Mary "Mink" Mincowitz), Kim Ulrich (Melissa Mincowitz), Ken Swofford (Mayor), Mark Lonow, Ed Hooks and Nicholas Guest (Mason). Co-Starring: Blackie Dammett (Jazz), Kim Milford (Cotton).
8	"Warzone"	Rob Bowman	Tom Blomquist	April 29, 1988	8807
After an accident, Jetto's mind reverts to five years previously, when he was double-crossed by comrades in battle, who turned out to be dealing in illegal drugs and weapons, and tried to murder him. In a dazed and confused state, he hunts down the two men, who are now in high positions, as Highway and Montana try to stop him before the Army takes him out, but uncovers a vein of corruption... Special Guest Star: Roger Davis (Chief Jim Townsend). Guest Starring: Ted Lange (Mayor John Fletcher), Terry Kiser (Colonel Halsted), Lara Parker (Dr. Terwishe), Mark Thomas Miller. Special Appearance: Wayne Newton (Bartlett).
9	"Frightmare"	Rob Bowman	Story by : Burt Pearl; Teleplay by : Glen A. Larson and David Garber & Bruce E. Kalish.	April 22, 1988	8812
Mafia crime-lord Manetti's men use a high-tech machine that can read agents' minds, to try to find the one man that is set to testify against him. When their first victim dies, Manetti's men capture Ms. Winthrop, and Highway and Jetto are in a race against time to save her before Manetti discovers the witness' true location... This episode, the last to be filmed, was originally designed to be the last broadcast episode, and in some ways bookends the series, making references to and via the memory machine, re-working scenes from "Road Ranger", "Billionaire Body Club", "'Till Death Duel Us Part" and "Haunted Highway" (which had not yet aired). However, "Haunted Highway" had been postponed on March 25, 1988, and ended up being broadcast as the final episode. Special Guest Star: Vince Edwards (Manetti). Guest Starring: Stanley Kamel (Cisco), Jack Ging (Riptide, The A-Team) (Admiral Conti), Alex Courtney (Dr. Sebring), Otto Felix, Janet Curtis, Judd Omen (Bronson), Zitto Kaxann.
