= Sher Mountain Killings Mystery =

- Poster
- Directed by: Vince Martin
- Written by: Denis Whitburn
- Produced by: Phillip Avalon
- Starring: Phillip Avalon; Abigail
- Cinematography: Ray Henman
- Edited by: Ted Otton
- Music by: Art Phillips
- Production company: Intertropic
- Release date: 1990
- Running time: 84 minutes
- Country: Australia
- Language: English
- Budget: A$1.5 million or $500,000

Sher Mountain Killings Mystery is a 1990 Australian film directed by Vince Martin and Phillip Avalon. This film is categorized as an "Ozploitation" horror film.

Screenwriter Denis Whitburn was gaining notice at the time with his work on the 1990 film Blood Oath. According to the Beyond press kit, producer Phillip Avalon devised the story and the basic script before bringing in Whitburn to improve it ("Denis Whitburn - The Screen Guide - Screen Australia", n.d.).

A unique feature of the film is that the cast includes British professional boxer Joe Bugner, who gained the nickname "Aussie Joe" after moving to Australia to make a late return to the ring.

== Plot ==
=== Synopsis ===
From Screen Australia: "Nobody believed the stone was really cursed. It was just another gem in the eyes of the thieves who stole it. But like all great mystery thrillers, things are not as they seem. This is a tale of the hunter, the haunted, the natural, the supernatural - the quick and the dead."

=== Storyline ===
When Davey Joe (Jeffrey Rhoe) is hired to take an ancient stone from an old Ranger's castle, he keeps it for himself in the expectation that it would bring him good luck and endless life. However, what follows is a path of mystery and deception. Davey Joe hides the cursed stone under his mute brother Caine’s (Phil Avalon) bed. Later, Alex (Tom Richards) brings Caine on a field trip to Sher Mountain, unaware that Caine has the cursed stone in his hands. They visit the Sher Mountain Forest ranger (Joe Bugner), who promotes Caine to Junior Ranger. The strange Ranger has pupils that shine an unsettling blue.

Conrad and Sole barge into Muriel and Davey Joe's apartment in the city. Sole and the Conrad manage to elude Muriel and drive to the Sher Mountain Wilderness Park with Billy in the back car. Sole and Conrad apprehend them and, using Billy as a hostage, threaten Alex and order that he tell the location of the cursed stone. However, Alex kicks Conrad in the balls, and he, Billy, and Caine grab the opportunity to flee the hapless Sole and Conrad.

Sole is able to reclaim ownership of the gemstone. However, this has a detrimental effect as the Ranger returns to reclaim the gemstone. Sole shoots his rifle at the old ranger, but the shots miss as the figure takes back the bag and twists and contorts Sole's arm. Sole tries to run, but blue light streaming down from the heavens captures Sole. He bursts into flames and dies.

The blue light fades back into the skies, and the survivors gather at the ranger station, with Alex informing Davey Joe that he's in trouble. "Thought I may be," a reflective Davey Joe says. Muriel finally catches up to Billy, who moans over not being able to pee for three hours, while Alex walks in on Dianne, who rapidly returns to reality.

== Genre ==
=== Ozploitation ===
The film, made in Australia in 1990, is categorized as an Ozploitation movie. ‘GCDb’ stated that the origin of the term comes from the fact that director Quentin Tarantino previously called the genre “Aussie-ploitation.” According to Mark Hartley's documentary Not Quite Hollywood, 'Ozploitation' films, that further refer to 1970s and 1980s commercial genre films such as action, road movies, sexploitation, and horror movies, have dominated a precarious situation within such a small to medium-sized 'national' cinema driven by cultural policy. One of the most important elements of this genre was how it used Australian stereotypes and aspects of Australian culture to attract an Australian and possible audience from overseas.

=== Horror ===
In his work Killer Koalas: Australian (and New Zealand) Horror Films: A History, writer Robert Hood makes the argument that Australian horror films frequently minimize narrative movement and therefore do not actually fit into the shape of the mostly storyline horror genre. In Sher Mountain Killings Mystery, the presence of Park Ranger’s Castle, the magical stone and its mysterious powers lends a horror and thriller tone to the film with the tendency of emphasizing ‘Australianness’ remaining true to its social reality.

== Characters ==
- Tom Richards as Alex
- Jeffrey Rhoe as Davey Joe
- Phillip Avalon as Caine
- Abigail as Muriel
- Steven Jacobs as Billy
- Elizabeth McIvor as Dianne
- Richard Carter as Conrad
- Ron Becks as Sole
- Joe Bugner as Ranger

== Production ==
=== Development ===
Wanting a script which would appeal to a global audience, Avalon started to write a mystery set in the early 1900s, drawing on stories from his childhood for some of the broader concepts. (Avalon, page 213)

=== Casting ===
Before meeting with director Vince Martin, Avalon had already decided on Tom Richard for the role of Alex Cordeaux off Richard's work on the TV series Sons and Daughters. Richard additionally played Peter Phelps' stepfather in the 1988 film Breaking Loose, which Avalon had produced (Avalon, P215). Vince proposed Ric Carter was suggested for the role of Conrad. Ron Becks, an American actor, auditioned for the role of the Ranger. At one point, Becks was considered for the role of Conrad, but he was cast as Sole instead, and Carter was cast as Conrad.

Avalon needed a giant-sized actor to play the ranger, who would age ten years. Boxer Joe Bugner was suggested. Bugner had acting experience in Europe, and he impressed both Avalon and Martin.

Avalon himself took the role of Caine the mute. Elizabeth McIvor, who had played a small part in the American TV show Cheers, also joined the cast. (Avalon, P215)

=== Music ===
Art Phillips composed the score for the film, which was performed by the band Gank. As it appears in SoundCloud, Kirke Godfrey, a member of the band, was not listed in the film lineup of the band while he was a main vocalist with Cameron Giles. Other than Art Phillips’ work, the song Voodoo, written and performed by Allan Zavod, was also used in the film (Martin, 1990).

== Distribution ==
Avalon presented the concept to Gary Hamilton at Arclight Films. Hamilton who had previously done a mystery film, stated that Columbia Pictures was looking for films for a forthcoming package for sale to South America, but he would not commit until he saw a finished film. Off this, Avalon chose to personally fund the film along with Peter Taylor.

Taylor and Avalon took the film to the American Film Market and secured a pre-sale for $500,000. The $50,000 down payment managed to secure the deal, and it fell through after the distribution company went bankrupt (Avalon, p215).

== Reception ==
=== Box office ===
The film did not chart on the Film Victoria report on the Australian box office, due in part to its minimal and limited initial run in Sydney and limited appearances elsewhere. Its primary market has been the thriller/mystery/supernatural aisles of record shops and TV programs. It was distributed in the United States by Sony Pictures Home Video under the name The Cursed Mountain Mystery, and in several other countries such as Colombia.

=== Critical response ===
Critical response for the film was generally poor. For Variety, David Stratton wrote, "The exceedingly tame thriller fantasy Sher Mountain Killings Mystery will be hard put to find customers, even on video" and called the casting of the black actor Ron Becks as the villain "a nasty piece of ethnic typecasting." Scott Murray called Sher Mountain Killings Mystery "simply one of least desirable thrillers made in this country" in his 1995 survey Australian Film, citing a poor script, repetitive framings, and a partially American cast.

=== Accolades ===
- Best Original Music Score at the AFI awards, also known as the AACTA Awards (Nominated)
