= Abigail (actress) =

English-born Australian actress (born 1948)

- Born: Abigail Rogan; 23 July 1948 (age 78); London, England
- Occupations: Actress, singer
- Years active: Early 1960s – 2016
- Known for: Number 96 as Bev Houghton; Sons and Daughters as Caroline Morrell; Family and Friends as Doreen Stubbs; Chances as Bambi Shute; Elly & Jools as Dulcie Dickson
- Spouse: Adrian Wright

Abigail Rogan (known mononymously as Abigail; born 23 July 1948 is an English-born former actress particularly of television soap operas and film who was also briefly a vocalist.

She emigrated from London in 1968 and became one of Australia's significant sex symbols of the early 1970s, promoted as a sultry blonde siren in the vein of Marilyn Monroe and Brigitte Bardot.

She appeared in numerous soap operas including, Number 96, Sons and Daughters, Family and Friends and Chances.

Despite having shied away from the spotlight, in 2022 Abigail wrote the foreword to the book Number 96: 50th Anniversary Album. In this book it states for the record that her surname is not and never was Rogan. It also states that her year of birth is 1948.

== Early life ==
Abigail was born in London, England in 1948 to a mother of Ceylonese (now Sri Lankan) and Dutch Burghers descent. Educated in France, she started her career in her native United Kingdom, appearing in such productions as Robin Hood and the Continental Theatre. She arrived in Australia to study civil engineering whilst acting part time, but made a major foray in to showbusiness when, in 1968, she was given the chance to appear as the female lead in a local theatre production of the British comedy There's a Girl in My Soup. She settled in Sydney and appeared in an advert with Phil Silvers and in the TV series Delta.

== Acting career ==
=== Film and television ===
She is best known for her roles in several prominent Australian TV soap operas, where she became known simply as 'Abigail'. She first became well known in Number 96, as an original cast member and as artist's model Bev Houghton, with her character providing fleeting nude glimpses. She became Australia's undisputed sex symbol of the early 1970s through the role. She was written out of the series after a dispute, although initially the media reported that she had left to appear in a movie in 1973. The character was re-cast with Victoria Raymond assuming the role. Abigail did however return to the soap in 1976 as the character of Eve.

During this period Abigail appeared in a series of brief cameo roles in a string of sex comedy films such as Alvin Purple (1973), and its 1974 sequel Alvin Rides Again. In 1974, Abigail would perform a striptease in the burlesque comedy "The Legend of San Peel" in The Barrel Theatre, a well-known strip palace in Kings Cross, while struggling to find serious acting jobs.

In 1975, she appeared in Class of '75 as a prim French Senior Mistress. Also in 1975 she played Esmerelda in The True Story of Eskimo Nell and in 1976 appeared in another bawdy comedy Eliza Fraser.

Abigail returned to Number 96 in November 1976. Her new character, the oft-divorced Eve, would potentially appear in a spinoff series, Fair Game, with Elaine Lee and Lynette Curran. It did not eventuate, although the completed pilot was divided up to create segments of three episodes of Number 96 (episodes 1079–1081).

Abigail appeared in a recurring sketch in The Norman Gunston Show called "The Checkout Chicks". This sketch, a send-up of melodramatic soap operas set in a supermarket, mostly featured other former Number 96 actresses. The show was cancelled in July 1977. Around the same time, she appeared in Glenview High. In 1977, Abigail appeared in The Young Doctors as super-efficient secretary Hilary Templeton. Also in 1977 she had a cameo role in the film Summer City, which is notable for being the first to have Mel Gibson in a major role.

In 1984 Abigail appeared in Melvin, Son of Alvin. In 1985, she scored a regular role in another soap opera Sons and Daughters, playing Caroline 'The Cat' Morrell, a role for which she became well known, and continued in until the series ended in 1987.

In 1988, she appeared in the film Breaking Loose, followed by a co-starring role in Elly & Jools playing Country & Western singer wannabe, Dulcie Dickson. In 1990 she appeared in Sher Mountain Killings Mystery followed by roles in soap operas Family and Friends and Neighbours. She then appeared in Chances as Bambi Shute, the host of a TV sex show, for most of 1992.

=== Theatre ===
Abigail had some success in the theatre, specialising in comedy roles. She toured New South Wales and Queensland with the stage farce A Bedfull of Foreigners in 1983.

== Publishing and music ==
In 1973, after leaving Number 96, she published her autobiography, Call Me Abigail which sold 150,000 copies in its first two weeks of sale. Also in 1973, Abigail made an attempt, one of the first soap stars to do so (prior to Kylie Minogue) at a popular music career and scored a hit with a cover of Serge Gainsbourg's "Je t'aime... moi non plus", which reached the top 10 in Australia. Although this debut was a success, follow-ups, including a comedic release with ventriloquist Chris Kirby, were not.

== Commercials ==
In 2002, she briefly became a spokesperson for weight-loss company Jenny Craig. She claimed to have lost 17 kilograms in seven weeks.

== Personal life ==
Abigail was married twice; first to Belgian businessman Pierre de Valmont, whom she divorced. Later she married actor Adrian Wright.

In March 2011, Australian current affairs program Today Tonight produced a story on Abigail, claiming that she had fallen on hard times and was living as a squatter in a derelict church. A rebuttal story was aired the following evening by rival current affairs program, A Current Affair. In fact she and her husband had been living there only temporarily, with permission, as their home had been partially destroyed in the 2011 floods. Her damaged home was being prepared for rebuilding. The Today Tonight story captured some hidden camera footage of Abigail. She did not appear on camera consensually.

== Filmography ==
=== Film ===
| Year | Title | Role | Type |
|---|---|---|---|
| | Les enfants de dieu | | Feature film |
| | Descente a la plague | | Feature film |
| | Imagination | | Feature film |
| 1970 | Play 543 | | Film short |
| 1973 | Alvin Purple | Girl in see-through blouse | Feature film |
| 1973 | The Wicked City | | TV movie |
| 1974 | Alvin Rides Again | Mae | Feature film |
| 1975 | The True Story of Eskimo Nell | Esmerelda | Feature film |
| 1976 | Murcheson Creek | Donna Lewis | TV movie |
| 1976 | Eliza Fraser | Buxom Girl | Feature film |
| 1977 | All at Sea | Denise Demour | TV movie |
| 1977 | Summer City | Woman in Pub | Feature film |
| 1984 | Melvin, Son of Alvin | Melvin's Mother, Mrs. Simpson | Feature film |
| 1988 | Breaking Loose: Summer City II | Helen | Feature film |
| 1990 | Sher Mountain Killings Mystery | Muriel Cordeaux | Feature film |
| 1990 | Friday on My Mind | | TV movie |
| 1995 | The Final Stage | The Woman | Feature film |
| 1999 | Liang Po Po | | Film short |
| 2000 | Gitano | Gypsy (voice) | Animated film short |

=== Television ===
| Year | Title | Role | Type |
|---|---|---|---|
| | Robin Hood | Young Child | 1 episode |
| | Continental Theatre | | 1 episode |
| 1969 | Delta | | 2 episodes |
| 1972–1973; 1976 | Number 96 | Bev Houghton / Eve | 77 episodes |
| 1974 | This Love Affair | Helen | Episode 2: "Tilting at Windmills" |
| 1975 | Class of '75 | Angelique Dupree | 98 episodes |
| 1975 | The Norman Gunston Show The Checkout Chicks sketch | Joan Bygraves | 6 episodes |
| 1976 | Fair Game | Eve | TV pilot |
| 1976 | The Bluestone Boys | | 1 episode |
| 1976 | Up The Convicts | Charlotte | 1 episode |
| 1977 | The Young Doctors | Hiliary Templeton | |
| 1978 | Glenview High | | 1 episode |
| 1978 | The Zodiac Girls | Miss Leo | TV pilot |
| 1979 | Chopper Squad | Alison Burns | 1 episode |
| 1980 | Home Sweet Home | Patient | 1 episode |
| 1981 | Trial By Marriage | Lavinia | 1 episode |
| 1981 | Are You Being Served? | Perfume Saleswoman | 1 episode |
| 1984 | Special Squad | Mrs. Quinn | 1 episode |
| 1985–1987 | Sons and Daughters | Caroline Morrell | 410 episodes |
| 1987 | Discovering Australia | Narrator | Film documentary |
| 1989 | Neighbours | Betty Bristow | 3 episodes |
| 1989 | Rafferty's Rules | Michelle Dobbs | 1 episode |
| 1989 | Bodysurfer | Mrs. James | Miniseries, 2 episodes |
| 1990 | Elly & Jools | Dulcie Dickson | 12 episodes |
| 1990 | Family and Friends | Doreen Stubbs | |
| 1991 | Col'n Carpenter | | 1 episode |
| 1991 | The Miraculous Mellops | Iron Peg | Miniseries, 1 episode |
| 1992 | Chances | Bambi Shute | 26 episodes |
| 1993 | Time Trax | Georgette | 1 episode |
| 1996 | Wedlocked | Radner | 1 episode |

=== Television (as self) ===
| Year | Title | Role | Type |
|---|---|---|---|
| 1975 | Celebrity Squares | Contestant | TV series |
| 1994 | Number 96: And They Said It Wouldn't Last | Presenter | TV special |
| 2016 | RealTVFilms | Host | 2 episodes |

== Theatre ==
| Year | Title | Role | Notes |
|---|---|---|---|
| 1969 | There's a Girl in My Soup | | Hole in the Wall Theatre, Perth |
| 1970 | Rookery Nook | | Playhouse, Perth with National Theatre Inc. |
| 1975 | Saga of San Peel | | |
| 1977 | Wild Oats | Jane | Seymour Centre, Sydney with Old Tote Theatre Company |
| 1981–1982 | A Bedfull of Foreigners | Simone | Her Majesty's Theatre, Brisbane, Marian St Theatre, Sydney, Bankstown Town Hall, Sydney with Peter Williams Productions |
| 1987 | My Fat Friend | | Civic Theatre Restaurant, Perth |
| 1988 | Rattle of a Simple Man | Cyrenna | Hyatt Kingsgate Hotel, Auckland |
| 1990 | Storm in a D Cup | | |
| 1990 | Lunatic Soup | Cassy | Glen St Theatre, Sydney with Theatre of Comedy |
| 1991–1992 | Charley's Aunt | | Sydney Opera House, Suncorp Theatre, Brisbane, Illawarra Performing Arts Centre, Laycock St Theatre, Gosford with Peter and Ellen Williams |

== Discography ==
=== Singles ===
| Year | Title | Label | Highest chart position |
|---|---|---|---|
| 1973 | "Je T'aime" / "Last Tango in Paris" | Festival Records (Australia) | No. 10, 11 weeks |
| 1973 | "Do It Again" / "Please Terry, Do It One More Time" (feat. Chris Kirby) | Festival Records (Australia) | No chart position |
| 1974 | "(Just As) I Am" / "These Dreams" | Festival Records (Australia) | No. 96, 1 week |
| 1976 | "Biting My Nails" / "Stay a While" | Festival Records (Australia) | No chart position |

=== Album ===
| Year | Title | Label | Tracklisting |
|---|---|---|---|
| 1973 | Abigail | Festival Records (Australia) | Side A: 1. "An Occasional Man" 2. "My Baby Does it Good" 3. "New Fangled Tango" 4. "These Dreams" 5. "Do It Again" 6. "Je T'aime" Side B: 1. "Sugar Me" 2. "The Man I Love" 3. "(Just As) I Am" 4. "Pillow Talk" 5. "Last Tango in Paris" 6. "Please Terry, Do It One More Time" (feat. Chris Kirby) |
