= Ripkin =

- Directed by: Frank Arnold
- Written by: Colin Free
- Produced by: Frank Arnold
- Starring: David Nettheim; Olivia Hamnett; Vince Martin; Belinda Giblin
- Production company: ABC
- Release date: 1978
- Running time: 75 mins
- Country: Australia
- Language: English

Ripkin is a 1978 Australian television film directed by Frank Arnold and starring David Nettheim, Olivia Hamnett, Vince Martin, and Belinda Giblin. The screenplay concerns an industrial scientist and his wife, who suspect each other of infidelity.
