= Virginia Hey =

Australian actress

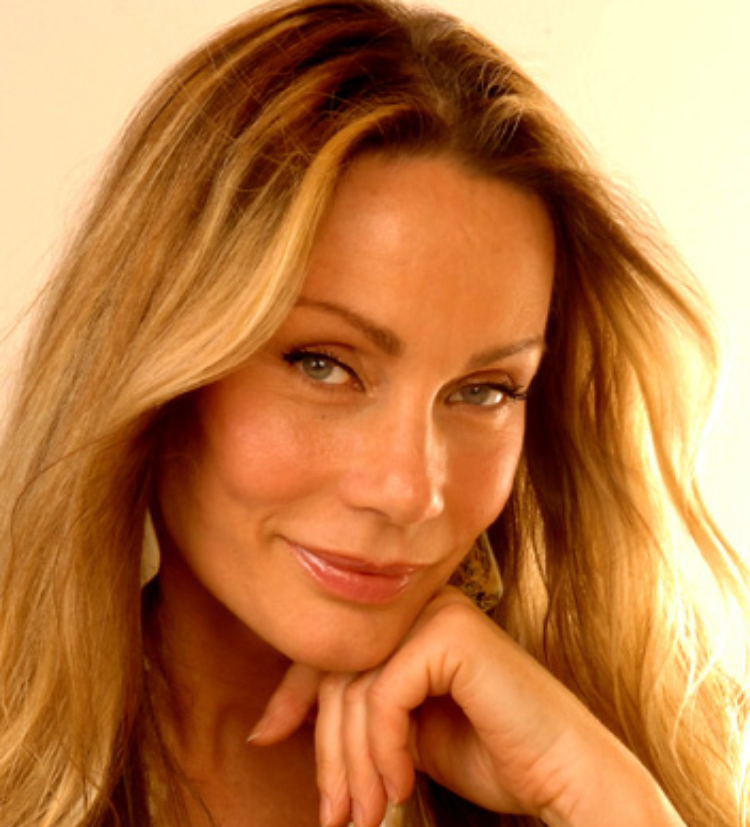
- Hey in 2016
- Born: Sydney, Australia
- Years active: 1981–present
- Height: 178 cm (5 ft 10 in)

Virginia Hey is an Australian actress, best known for her role as Pa'u Zotoh Zhaan in Farscape. She also played the Warrior Woman in the film Mad Max 2: The Road Warrior. She has various roles in television series, such as lawyer Jennifer St James in E Street.

== Career ==
Hey began her career as a fashion model after being discovered at a bus stop by POL magazine editor Wendy Adnam. She appeared on several magazine covers and started her acting career in television advertisements (57 in all), television dramas and films in Australia and the United Kingdom.

In 1979, Hey appeared in live TV performances with The Buggles for their song "Video Killed the Radio Star", including on the BBC's Top of the Pops and on German television. She appeared in the music video for the Mama's Boys song "Needle in the Groove" in 1985.

Hey's film and television credits include the Warrior Woman in Mad Max 2: The Road Warrior and General Pushkin's girlfriend, Rubavitch, in the James Bond film The Living Daylights. In 1999 she was cast in a leading role in the science fiction television series Farscape, playing the blue-skinned alien priestess Pa'u Zotoh Zhaan. For her role as Zhaan, Hey was nominated for Best Supporting Actress on Television by the Saturn Awards. She left the show early in the third season for health reasons: the prosthetic makeup worn over her head and chest to achieve Zhaan's appearance and the stress of the long filming days caused her kidneys to bleed, subsequently leading to a decline in her health. She also grew tired of shaving her head and eyebrows for the role.

Hey has also appeared in various Australian soap operas, including Prisoner (Cell Block H) as Leigh Templar, Neighbours as Beth Travers, E Street as Jennifer St. James, and Pacific Drive as Margaux Hayes.

== Personal life ==
Hey teaches meditation across the United States and United Kingdom, and is certified in natural therapy. She currently resides in the United Kingdom. In 2022, Hey was diagnosed with stage 4 cancer.

== Filmography ==
=== Film ===
Year	Title	Role	Notes
1981	Mad Max 2: The Road Warrior	The Warrior Woman	
1982	Norman Loves Rose	The Girlfriend	
1982	The Return of Captain Invincible	Beautician	
1986	Castaway	Janice	
1987	The Living Daylights	Rubavitch	
1988	Pathos – Segreta inquietudine	Diane	aka A Taste for Fear; Italian film
1994	Signal One	Toni	aka Bullet Down Under
1999	Game Room	Dr. Greta Davis	
2011	Alien Armageddon	Ute	

=== Television ===
Year	Title	Role	Notes
1979	Top of the Pops	Herself - The Buggles	1 episode
1982	The Don Lane Show	Herself	1 episode
1982	The Daryl Somers Show	Herself	1 episode
1984	Prisoner	Leigh Templar	14 episodes
1985	Timeslip: the Block	Jenny	Yorkshire TV pilot
1985	Big Deal	Ticket officer	Episode: "Popping Across the Pond"
1985	Mussolini: The Untold Story	Young Woman	TV miniseries 1 episode
1986	Neighbours	Beth Travers	8 episodes
1987	Vietnam	Journalist	TV miniseries 1 episode
1987	Network 7	Chablis	1 episode
1989	Mission: Impossible	Danielle	Episode: "The Killer"
1989	Dolphin Cove	Alison Mitchell	8 episodes
1989–1990	E Street	Jennifer St. James	56 episodes
1990–1993	Tonight Live with Steve Vizard	Herself	5 episodes
1992	Street Stories	Herself	1 episode
1993	Ernie and Denise	Herself	1 episode
1993	A Current Affair	Herself	2 episodes
1993–1997	Ray Martin at Midday	Herself	2 episodes
1993	Paradise Beach	Val Sterling	
1994	Signal One: Behind The Scenes	Herself	TV special
1994–1998	Good Morning Australia	Herself	6 episodes
1994	Love Rules	Herself	1 episode
1994	Hello: Home Shopping	Herself	TV infomercial
1994	Live It Up	Herself	1 episode
1994	Midday with Derryn Hinch	Herself	1 episode
1996	Pacific Drive	Margeaux Hayes	
1996	Flipper	Adams	Episode: "The Pearl Maker"
1997	Monday to Friday	Herself	1 episode
1997	Home and Away	Gillian	3 episodes
1997	Roar	Queen Una	Episode: "Pilot"
1997	Midday With Kerri-Anne	Herself	1 episode
1997	Sex and Beyond: 25 Years Of Cleo	Herself	TV special
1998	All Saints	Joanna Travers	Episode: "Yesterday's News"
1999–2002	Farscape	Regular roles: Pa'u Zotoh Zhaan / Dr. Jane Komenski	50 episodes
2012	FedCon XXI	Herself	German film documentary
2014	Ckds at the Cons: Chippenham 2014	Herself	TV documentary
2014	Rick and Morty	Gazorpian (voice)	Episode: "Raising Gazorpazorp"
2014–2016	From the Mouths of Babes	Herself	4 episodes
2015	Kosmos	Lead role: Diana Lord	5 episodes
2024	Gracemarch	Mary March	TV movie

=== Video games ===
Year	Title	Role	Notes
2002	Farscape: The Game	Pa'u Zotoh Zhaan (voice)	
