= Ben Hall (TV series) =

- Genre: adventure
- Written by: Tony Morphett; Ted Roberts
- Directed by: Don Chaffey; Carl Schultz; Frank Arnold
- Starring: Jon Finch; Vincent Ball; Brian Blain
- Composer: Bruce Smeaton
- Countries of origin: Australia; United Kingdom
- Original language: English
- No. of episodes: 13

Production
- Producer: Neil McCallum
- Camera setup: Geoff Burton A.C.S. Peter Hendry
- Running time: 60 mins

Original release
- Network: ABC (Australia); BBC (UK)
- Release: 6 July 1975 (UK)

Ben Hall is a 1975 Australian TV series based on the bush ranger Ben Hall. The TV series stars Jon Finch as Ben Hall, Evin Crowley as Biddy Hall, John Castle as bushranger Frank Gardiner, Brian Blain as Sir Frederick Pottinger, Jack Charles as Billy Dargin and John Orcsik as John Gilbert. Neil McCallum was the creator-producer and the series editor was Colin Free.

It was a co-production between the ABC, BBC-TV, and 20th Century Fox. It was called the most ambitious drama production of the ABC with a budget of $1 million.

The series was filmed in the Megalong Valley, New South Wales and in the suburb of Belrose.

McCallum said "The series is not an accurate story of the life of Ben Hall. It is impossible in 13 one-hour programs to reconstruct a man's life over a period of ten years. What we have done is to be meticulous in reconstructing the period in which he lived so that the series represents, I think, a very real picture of Australia in the 1860s."

== Cast ==
=== Main ===
- Jon Finch as Ben Hall
- Evin Crowley as Biddy Hall (née Walsh)
- John Castle as Frank Gardiner
- Brian Blain as Sir Frederick Pottinger
- Vincent Ball as Sergeant Garland
- Sandra Lee Paterson as Kate Owen (née Walsh)

=== Support ===
- Tom Farley as Pa Walsh
- Alister Smart as Jack Taylor
- Jack Charles as Billy Dargin
- Hugh Keays-Byrne as Piesley
- Alfred Bell as Jack McGuire
- Frank Gallacher as 'Goobang' Mick Connolly
- Diana McLean as Helen McGuire (née Walsh)
- Ruth Cracknell as Ma Walsh
- Paul Bertram as Patsy Daley
- Ian Dyson as George Owen
- John Orcsik as John Gilbert
- Judy McBurney as Alison Buchanan / Rebecca
- Melissa Jaffer as Mrs Daley
- Elizabeth Alexander as Angela Mitchell
- Tom Oliver as Long Tom Coffin
- Justine Saunders as Jununju
- Martin Phelan as Fordyce
- Vince Martin as Johnny Bow
- Chris King as 'Warrigal' Walsh
- Les Foxcroft as 'Saucepan' Billy
- Adrian Bernotti as James Dunleavy
- Scott Humphries as Mickey Burke
- Harold Hopkins as John Vane
- Max Osbiston as Buchanan
- Roger Thwaites as Trooper Havillandd
- Stephen Brown as Baby Hall
- Marge Timberay as Aboriginal Woman
- Barry Hill as John O'Meally
- Alexandra Hynes as Mary Connelly
- Michelle Morgan and Jennifer Brown as McGuire Children
- Jennifer Cluff as Catherine
- Ric Hutton as Cowper

== Production ==
Filming started 30 December 1974. It took six months to film.

== Release ==
A documentary was made to promote the series Ben Hall in the Making.

== Episodes ==
1. Nobody's Man (UK 6 July 1975, Aust 7 September 1975). It promises to be a good year for cattleman Ben Hall until ex-convict bushranger Frank Gardiner escapes from a road gang to the Wheogo district, bringing the New South Wales Mounted Police after him and his ruthless companions, Piesley and Troy. w Ted Roberts d Don Chaffey.
2. The Vow (UK 13 July 1975, Ast: 4 September 1975). A cattle muster becomes a shambles when Gardiner and his friends arrive. Escaped convict John Piesley Is out to kill Ben Hall. Piesley and Gardiner arrive at the cattle muster at the McGuires'. w Frank Nesbitt d Don Chaffey.
3. The Promise (UK: 20 July 1975, Aust: 21 September 1975). Gardiner plans to use Ben Hall's wedding as a diversion to rescue Johnny Gilbert from Wheogo prison. w Allan Prior d Don Chaffey.
4. The Cruel Season (UK: 27 July 1975, Aust: 28 September 1975). Hall loses most of his stock in drought. His wife asks him to sell his horses and move. w Eleanor Witcombe d Frank Arnold.
5. Blind Justice (UK: 3 Aug 1975, Aust: 5 Oct 1975). Bushranger Saucepan Bill shoots an armed guard. Ben Hall's horse is recognised and Ben is arrested for murder. w Tony Morphett d Frank Arnold.
6. Going Home (UK: 10 Aug 1975, Aust: 12 Oct 1975). Struggling financially due to drought, Ben leaves his pregnant wife to go work in the gold rush. w: Tony Morphett.
7. The Rock (UK: 17 Aug 1975, Aust: 19 Oct 1975). Feeling he has nothing to lose, Hall joins Frank Gardiner and his gang to rob a coach at the rock. w Tony Morphett d Peter Maxwell.
8. Yellowback (UK: 24 Aug, Aust: 26 Oct 1975). The police organise a manhunt in the mountains and arrest Ben's wife as a ploy. w Jesse Lasky Jr & Pat Silver d Don Chaffey.
9. A Greater Love (UK: 31 Aug 1975, Aust: 2 Nov 1975). Many innocent homesteaders are arrested in the campaign against the bushrangers. w Lindsay Galloway d Don Chaffey
10. The Attack (UK: 7 Sept 1975, Aust: 9 Nov 1975). Ben Hall disguises his men as troopers in command of a convict road-gang to surprise an army coach and later Sir Frederick Pottinger.w Ted Roberts d Don Chaffey.
11. The Legacy (UK: 14 Sept 1975, Aust: 16 Nov 1975). Ben plans to use Pottinger in a daring rescue scheme on behalf of the valley settlers to obtain legal rights to their land. w Ray Johnson d Frank Arnold.
12. The Pursued (UK: 21 Sept 1975, Aust: 23 Nov 1975). Ben is outlawed under the Felons Act and has a price on his head. w Ray Johnson d Don Chaffey.
13. Once Upon a Time (UK: 28 Sept 1975, Aust: 30 Nov 1975). Ben Hall plans to leave but won't go without his wife and child. Sgt Garland is determined to capture and kill him. w: Ted Roberts d: Don Chaffey.
