= Keiron: The First Voyager =

- Directed by: Bert Deling
- Written by: Bert Deling
- Produced by: Michael Milne
- Starring: Philippa Scott; Vince Martin
- Production company: Network Film Corporation
- Release date: 1985
- Running time: 62 mins
- Country: Australia
- Language: English
- Budget: $2.1 million

Keiron: The First Voyager is a 1985 Australian film about escapees from earth. It was shot from February to March 1985.
