= Phillip Avalon =

Australian writer, producer, director and actor

Phillip Avalon is an Australian writer, producer, director and actor of films and TV.

== Biography ==
Avalon grew up in Newcastle. Avalon was born Phillip Holbrook, changing his name to Avalon once he moved to Sydney. He spent several years serving in the Australian army, including a stint in New Guinea.

Avalon first came to public attention as a model, then he moved into acting. He studied acting at the Independent Theatre in North Sydney, and began getting roles in stage productions such as Hadrian VII with Barry Morse and on Australian TV dramas.

In 1974 Avalon spent some time in Los Angeles seeking work as an actor.

=== Producer ===
Avalon moved into producing with Double Deal, a movie he made for television which he wrote and produced, as well as starring in. The film was never released due to Avalon running out of funds, but he regarded it as his "personal film school."

He produced and starred in Summer City (1977), a drama set around a surfing town which became a hit, and was Mel Gibson's first movie. He was later called in to help make the film Little Boy Lost (1978). He had such an unhappy time on the film he left the film industry for a number of years, focusing on other interests, notably a surf shop..

== Select filmography ==
- That Lady from Peking (1969) - actor
- Squeeze a Flower (1970) - actor
- Number 96 (1974) (film) - cameo
- Inn of the Damned (1974) - actor
- The Resurrection (1974) (TV special) - actor
- The Third Eye - actor
- Double Dealer (1975) (TV movie)
- Waverider (1975)
- Summer City (1977) - producer, actor
- Little Boy Lost (1978) - producer
- Breaking Loose (1988) - producer
- Sher Mountain Killings Mystery (1990) - producer
- Exchange Lifeguards (1992)
- Fatal Bond (1993)
- Signal One (1994)
- Tunnel Vision (1995)
- The Finder (2001)
- The Pact (2003)
- Liquid Bridge (2003)
- William Kelly's War (2014)

== Notes ==
- Avalon, Phil (2015). From Steel City to Hollywood. New Holland.
