= Signal One (1994 film) =

- Film poster
- Directed by: Rob Stewart
- Written by: Karl Schiffman
- Produced by: Phillip Avalon
- Starring: Christopher Atkins; Mark 'Jacko' Jackson; Richard Carter; Virginia Hey
- Cinematography: Martin McGrath
- Edited by: Tony Kavanagh
- Music by: Art Phillips
- Release date: 1994
- Running time: 95 minutes
- Country: Australia
- Language: English
- Box office: A$2,000 (Australia)

Signal One (also known as Bullet Down Under) is a 1994 Australian crime film directed by Rob Stewart and starring Christopher Atkins, Mark Jackson, Richard Carter, and Virginia Hey. It is a buddy cop movie.

== Production ==
The film was known as Bullet Down Under.

It was made partly with finance from the NSW Film and Television Office and the FFC.

== Plot synopsis ==
Martin Bullet is a former cop from Los Angeles who has just moved to Sydney, Australia to escape difficulties back home. Joining the Sydney police force, Martin is given Jack Moran for a partner after the latter lost one recently. The two become involved in the unsavory dealings of a vicious crime syndicate while trying to solve the murder of Jack's last partner.

== Cast ==
- Christopher Atkins as Martin Bullet
- Mark 'Jacko' Jackson as Jack Moran
- Richard Carter as Frankie Button
- Virginia Hey as Toni
- Alfred Bell as Doug Button
- Maureen O'Shaughnessy as Charlene Bullet
- Laurie Moran as Boza Hentley
- Kee Chan as Chang Kai Chee
