= Keith McGowan =

Australian radio presenter (1943–2013)

Keith McGowan OAM
- Born: 9 March 1943; Melbourne, Australia
- Died: 22 December 2013 (aged 70); Melbourne, Australia
- Occupations: Media personality; talkback presenter
- Employer: 3AW
- Spouse(s): Angela McGowan (Married 2006)
- Children: Nathan and Tania (from previous marriage)

Keith McGowan OAM (9 March 1943 – 22 December 2013) was an Australian radio presenter. He was born in Melbourne, Australia and died there, aged 70 years.

== Radio career ==
McGowan got his first job in radio in May 1957, when he started as an office boy at 3UZ at the age of 14. His mother had heard about the job while listening to the station. Then he worked at the following radio stations in order: 3TR, 7BU, 7HO, 6PR, 3TR (again), 2NM, 2KA, 2HD, 2UW, 3MP, 3DB, 3AK, 3AW.

McGowan first made a name for himself in Perth at 6PR in the mid-1960s, where he and his station, then known as The Home of the Good Guys rose to the top of the ratings. After his retirement, McGowan stated that his days at 6PR from 1964 to 1968 were the highlight of his career.

In 1990 he joined Melbourne radio station 3AW hosting the overnight program Overnighters from midnight until 5.30 am Monday to Friday. McGowan would develop a cult following in Melbourne through this long running show. Regular contributors were Brad Higgins, Nick Le Souef the "Outback Legend" and Chris DeFraga on motoring. The Antiques and Collectibles Radio Show was also featured, from midnight to 2 am Friday mornings. Tony Shields, from Shields Stamps and Coins and Rick Milne were regular contributors.

He celebrated his 50th anniversary of broadcasting on 27 May 2007.

McGowan retired in July 2011, after presenting the Overnighters program on 3AW for 21 years. His final program was broadcast on Friday, 22 July 2011. McGowan said the highlight of his career was that after 54 years of broadcasting, "I chose my own time to give it all away".

== Television ==
In the 1960s McGowan hosted a show called Teen Time On Ten on regional Victorian television station GLV-10.

== Recordings ==
In 1979 McGowan had a top ten hit in Australia with a narrative piece called A Little Boy's Christmas Prayer which has since been re–released on compilation CDs.

He also compiled and released a nostalgia CD containing tracks by various artists, called And Then Came Rock n Roll.

== Publications/writing ==
McGowan published six books, known as the Overnighters books. Titles include Thanks for the Memories, You Must Remember This, Motherhood and Apple Pie "The way we were" Good on You, Dad and "Down memory lane".

Following his retirement he was a regular contributor on radioinfo a website for broadcast professionals.

== Personal life ==
McGowan married his wife, Angela, in February 2006 on a paddle steamer in Echuca, Victoria. He had a son and a daughter from his first marriage, to Jill.

McGowan bred and raced standard-bred (harness) horses and travelled extensively throughout Australia, particularly in the outback. He supported the St Kilda Football Club and Melbourne Storm.

In January 1977, McGowan was a passenger on the train that left the tracks and hit a bridge causing it to collapse on two carriages of the train, resulting in 83 deaths. The tragedy occurred in Granville in Sydney's west and became known as the Granville rail disaster. McGowan survived because he always sat in the last carriage as he felt it was safer. His first-hand reporting of the tragedy on radio 2UW, on the John Laws program, was "one of the most powerful news reports filed in Australian radio", according to award-winning news reporter and journalist, Andrew Rule.

Overnight on 19 December 2013, McGowan suffered a stroke in his sleep and died at approximately 11.00pm on 22 December 2013, after his life support was switched off.

McGowan was recognised in the 2014 Queen's Birthday Honours with an OAM for his service to broadcast media spanning 54 years.
