= Denis Whitburn =

Australian film writer and producer (born 1944)

Denis Whitburn (born 13 September 1944) is an Australian film writer and producer. He was a copywriter and journalist who moved into screenwriting and theatre.

Whitburn often worked with Phil Avalon who wrote:

Denis is a real character. Stocky-build, bearded with a scattergun approach to life. Cigar hanging out of his mouth, think Orson Welles Oz version. I loved Denis' writing style, he had this 'Tarantino' way with dialogue, it was kooky, cool, he needed a good director to be on the same page.

== Selected credits ==
=== Film and TV ===
- Crosstalk (1982) - writer
- The Last Bastion (1984) - writer, producer
- Breaking Loose (1988) - script editor
- Bodysurfer (1989) (mini series) - writer
- Blood Oath (1990) - writer, producer
- Sher Mountain Killings Mystery (1990) - writer
- Bony (TV series) (1992) - writer of episode
- Billy's Holiday (1995) - writer, producer
- Elephant Princess (1996) - writer
- Making Venus (2002) - himself

=== Theatre ===
- The Siege of Frank Sinatra
