= Tusitala (miniseries) =

- Genre: Drama
- Written by: Peter Yeldham
- Directed by: Don Sharp
- Starring: John McEnery; Angela Punch McGregor
- Countries of origin: Australia; United Kingdom
- Original language: English
- No. of seasons: 1
- No. of episodes: 6

Production
- Producer: Ray Alchin
- Production locations: Australia; West Samoa
- Production company: Australian Broadcasting Corporation

Original release
- Network: ABC
- Release: 15 June – 17 June 1986
- Network: Channel 4
- Release: 22 July – 24 July 1986

Tusitala is a 1986 three-part mini series for television based on the last years in the life of Robert Louis Stevenson, when he left Great Britain for Sydney and west Samoa.

== Samoa Connection ==
In the Samoan language Tusitala means writer of stories and it is there that Robert Louis Stevenson spent his last four years. He was buried there at Mount Vaea.

== Cast ==
- John McEnery as Robert Louis Stevenson
- Angela Punch McGregor as Fanny Stevenson
- Kirk Alexander as Henley
- Dorothy Alison as Maggie
- Norman Kaye as Rev. Clarke
- Lynn Dalby as Almelia Clarke
- Joseph Fürst as Von Pilsarch
- John Hamblin as Dr. Eisler
- Olivia Hamnett as Lady Jersey
- Julie Nihill as Belle Strong
- John Gregg as Cusack-Smith

== Production ==
There had been plans to film this in the 1960s by Cinesound Productions.

In 1983 producer Ray Alchin announced Ted Roberts would be the writer. The ABC deliberately aimed at an international co production. "We're branching out with an international figure," said Alchin.

The budget was $5 million.

Filming started June 1985 by which stage the writer had become Peter Yeldham. It was the only production Don Sharp ever directed in his native Australia.
