= Vince Martin (actor) =

Dutch-Australian actor, director, and jazz singer

- Born: Vincent Markesteijn; 3 July 1955 (age 70); Netherlands
- Occupations: Actor; editor; director; voice artist; singer; musician
- Known for: Number 96; The Restless Years; The Young Doctors; Sons and Daughters; E Street
- Children: 1

Vince Martin (born 3 July 1955) is a Dutch-Australian actor, editor, director, jazz singer, and musician.

Martin was born as Vincent Markesteijn in the Netherlands and was raised in Australia from the age of 7. He is well known for his stint on soap opera E Street portraying Steven Richardson (aka 'Mr. Bad'), in one of the series popular recurring story arcs.

== Career ==
=== Film and television ===
Martin began as a film editor on police drama series Homicide. His editing career had begun at the age of 16 at Crawford Productions. He quickly moved on to directing television series for the same company.

Beginning in the 1970s, Martin became a regular face on Australian television, with both guest starring series roles, and regular roles in several soap operas, as well as films. He played two different characters in teen soap Class of '74, then completed regular stints in soaps Number 96 (as David Palmer), The Restless Years (as Craig Garside) and The Young Doctors (as Dr. Richard Quinlan).

From 1977, Martin appeared in a regular capacity in soap opera Kirby's Company, a soap opera about the stories of three generations of males from one family. He also had regular roles in Sons and Daughters (as Matt Kennedy). He also played Phil Bryant, one-time husband of Marilyn Chambers (Emily Symons) in long-running soap opera Home and Away. Martin's role as serial killer Steven Richardson (better known as 'Mr Bad') over the course of a year in soap opera E Street saw the series reach record ratings.

Martin's television guest appearances include Chopper Squad, Special Squad and Mission: Impossible.

Martin film credits include playing the title role of Keiron in 1985 TV movie Keiron: The First Voyager and antagonist Steve Beck in 1988 thriller Watch the Shadows Dance (aka Nightmaster) opposite Nicole Kidman in one of her early roles. In 1994, he played Jimmy Pollard in thriller Ebbtide with Harry Hamlin. He later featured alongside Tom Hanks in 2000 American survival film Cast Away, as Pilot Albert Miller. In 2012, he played Wayne in New Zealand family film Kiwi Flyer (also known as Derby Dogs).

Martin worked as a regular director on soap opera Sons and Daughters. He also directed episodes of Neighbours and A Country Practice. He went on to direct the 1990 mystery thriller film The Sher Mountain Killings Mystery. Martin co-wrote the film script for Joan Collins' book "Prime-Time".

=== Music ===
During the early 1980s, Martin also performed with his band New Toys as lead singer in venues around Sydney.

Martin currently performs in various jazz & blues ensembles in New York City and Los Angeles, at venues including Birdland, The Blue Note, House of Blues and the Hollywood Grill. He covers artists including Michael Bublé, Robbie Williams, Frank Sinatra, B. B. King, Van Morrison, Eric Clapton and Ray Charles.

=== TVC ===
Martin's decades-long campaign for Beaurepaires New Zealand aired in both New Zealand and Australia, beginning in the 1980s. It won international advertising awards and made him one of the most recognised performers in New Zealand. He became one of the longest serving retail brand spokespersons in New Zealand television history.

== Filmography ==
=== Film ===
Year	Title	Role	Notes	Ref.
1978	Little Boy Lost			
1980	Touch and Go	Steve		
1988	Breaking Loose: Summer City II	Robbie		
1994	Ebbtide	Jimmy Pollard		
1996	Unnaturally Born Killers			
2000	Cast Away	Pilot Albert 'Al' Miller		
2012	Kiwi Flyer (aka Derby Dogs)	Wayne		

=== Television ===
Year	Title	Role	Notes	Ref.
1963–1974	Ryan	Henchman / Tom Sinclair	2 episodes	
1972–1973	Matlock Police	Trevor / Con Campbell / Sandy Whitehead	3 episodes	
1973	Homicide	Alex Le Mar	1 episode	
1972–1974	Division 4	Jimmy Ellis / Constable Ken Squires / Bert / Roger Brown / David Thompson	7 episodes	
1974	Class of '74	Gary Evans	1 episode	
1974	The Hotline		TV movie	
1975	Ben Hall	Johnny Bow	Miniseries, 5 episodes	
1975	Number 96	David Palmer	36 episodes	
1976	Rush	Lindsay Quail	1 episode	
1976	King’s Men		1 episode	
1977	The Outsiders	Geoff Murdoch	1 episode	
1977	Mama's Gone A-Hunting	David	TV movie	
	Glenview High		Episode: "Jackson High"	
1977–1978	Kirby's Company	Jimmy Kirby	18 episodes	
1977–1979	The Restless Years	Craig Garside	36 episodes	
1978	Ripkin		TV movie	
1978	Chopper Squad	Craig Robinson	1 episode	
1978	Cass		TV movie	
1981	The Young Doctors	Dr. Richard Quinlan	33 episodes	
1982	1915	Frank Barton	Miniseries, 2 episodes	
1983–1984	Sons and Daughters	Matt Kennedy	30 episodes	
1984	Special Squad	Kelly	1 episode	
1985	A Country Practice	Nicholas Bowen	2 episodes	
1985	Keiron: The First Voyager	Keiron	TV movie	
1986	Sword of Honour	Phillip	Miniseries, 1 episode	
1988	Watch the Shadows Dance (aka Night Master)	Steve Beck	TV movie	
1988	Mission: Impossible	Copperfield	1 episode	
1988	The Flying Doctors	Barry Standish	2 episodes	
1989	Rafferty's Rules	Tom Miller	1 episode	
1991	Chances	Gordon McKinney	12 episodes	
1991–1992	E Street	Steven Richardson (aka 'Mr Bad')	38 episodes	
1992	Home and Away	Phil Bryant	12 episodes	
1992	Bony	Greg	1 episode	
1993	Time Trax	Captain Nash	1 episode	
1993	Deepwater Haven	Jack Wilson		
1993	Soldier Soldier	Col Ray Curry	2 episodes	
2012	Tricky Business	Ross Beechworth	1 episode	

== Personal life ==
Martin has a daughter, Emma. After working in Los Angeles, he now works in New York City and New Jersey as a jazz singer/musician. After 10 years together, Martin married Jenifer Swenson on 29 April 2014.
