= Making Venus =

- Film poster
- Directed by: Gary Doust
- Written by: Gary Doust
- Produced by: Tom Zubyricki
- Edited by: Alison Croft
- Music by: Paul Healy
- Release date: 2002
- Running time: 68 minutes
- Country: Australia
- Language: English

Making Venus is a 2002 Australian documentary film directed by Gary Doust. It follows Sydney filmmakers Jason Gooden and Julian Saggers as they attempt to make an independent, self-funded feature film about the pornography industry and are beset with mounting setbacks and costs. The film's events take place from 1997 to 2003, as the initial cut of Making Venus was released in 2002 but the film's final events take place in 2003.

== Synopsis ==
In September 1997, Sydney-based cousins Jason Gooden and Julian Saggers have raised $100,000 from family and friends to produce a comedy feature film about the pornography industry entitled The Venus Factory, based on a screenplay by Glenn Fraser. The film tells the story of a porn performer who tries to break into dramatic acting, finds himself not up to the task and goes back into porn on his own terms.

As the shoot begins, the production is already in deficit by $50,000 while Fraser is still heavily editing the script and neither Gooden or Saggers have read the latest revision. Some of the first scenes filmed include a Star Wars porn parody with a dildo spaceship, and a scene in which two people made up to resemble a lion and zebra have simulated sex. During filming of a Roman orgy scene, the extras discreetly replace blackcurrant juice with actual wine and spend hours on set getting drunk.

The plan was originally to defer all cast wages, but MEAA intervene and insist that the cast must be paid upfront. MEAA also discover that a mandatory safety report has not been submitted and threaten to shut down filming. The production ultimately passes MEAA's safety inspection, but filming cannot continue without more investment as the cost has now blown out to $204,000. Investor Leonard Coster convinces his father to produce an additional $20,000, and filming is able to continue for another week. When the shoot wraps, the budget is $257,000 total.

In February 1998, the critically acclaimed American film Boogie Nights is released in Australia. Coincidentally, it shares a similar storyline to The Venus Factory. The following month, an unfinished cut of The Venus Factory is shown to a test audience who overwhelmingly do not enjoy the film. At least one person comments that it is too similar to Boogie Nights, which they have just seen. The producers decide to reshoot and reedit some scenes, and begin shopping the unfinished film to local distributors. None wish to pick it up, and by mid-1998, production costs have blown out to $412,000.

In June 1999, with investors turning hostile, Saggers and Gooden fire Fraser. They replace him with Denis Whitburn, who plans to rewrite the screenplay and direct the filming of additional scenes in a desperate attempt to salvage the production by turning it into a "romantic drama." They also apply for a $240,000 bank loan to cover additional costs, misleading the bank by claiming that the loan is for a house. As the reshoot begins, the revised screenplay is also itself not finished. Various scenes are shot on location, including at a butcher shop, Wentworth Park and Beulah Street Wharf. By the time the reshoot wraps in 2000, the total cost is $748,000.

Gooden and Saggers name themselves "Tomahawk Inc" and begin renting an office in Cremorne to create the appearance that they are "happening more than (they) are." They also pay for a company ident in which a Native American man throws a tomahawk at the camera. At the Tomahawk offices, Fraser is shown the latest cut of the film and chooses to have his name removed from the credits. The film, now known as Starring Duncan Wiley, is completed only hours before a scheduled screening to a test audience in Canberra as part of the AFI Awards selection process. Despite a visibly lukewarm audience response, Gooden and Saggers convince themselves the film was well received. A subsequent screening in Sydney is also negatively received, and Starring Duncan Wiley is not picked up by distributors. Meanwhile, Fraser and Whitburn meet in a bar and bond over their shared difficulties with the producers.

By 2001, the budget has blown out to $1,000,000 - all of it debt owed by Gooden and Saggers to various creditors. They decide to re-edit the film yet again, removing most of the new footage, restoring it to a comedy and retitling it Money Shot. Whitburn, like Fraser, also asks for his name to be removed from the film's credits. Gooden and Saggers pack up their Cremorne offices and continue working on Money Shot.

The initial cut of Making Venus is released to positive reception in 2002, while Money Shot itself is ultimately released in 2003 at a total cost of $1,104,000 and with no director credited. It runs for six weeks in local arthouse cinemas and closes with little notice.

In the film's closing scene, Saggers says that "making a film is a lot like opening a beer bottle, that doesn't have a twist-top, with a bread knife", as he attempts to do so. In an extended sequence, he struggles with the knife and the beer bottle while expanding on this analogy before he finally succeeds in opening the bottle. It is then revealed that the bottle had a twist-top lid after all.

== Release and reception ==
In 2002, Making Venus debuted at the Melbourne International Film Festival. The following year, it ran as a double feature with Money Shot at Sydney's Valhalla Cinema and a handful of others around Australia. David Stratton reviewed Money Shot negatively on The Movie Show but said that Making Venus was "an excellent documentary... a series of catastrophes that are at the same time amusing and sad." The Age wrote that the film "contains salutary lessons in the perils of putting ambition before experience." Gooden considered the film "a bit cruel in parts", but added that "you've just got to cop that... whenever someone portrays someone's life, the person portrayed will always have issues with it. Look at Michael Jackson."
