= Double Dealer (film) =

- Written by: Phillip Avalon
- Directed by: Alan Dickes
- Starring: Phillip Avalon; Guy Peniston-Bird; David Callcot
- Music by: Southern Contemporary Rock Assembly
- Country of origin: Australia
- Original language: English

Production
- Producer: Phillip Avalon
- Cinematography: Richard Bradley
- Running time: 72 minutes
- Budget: A$45,000 or $36,000

Original release
- Release: 1975

Double Dealer is a 1975 Australian TV film about an undercover drug ring. It was the first film produced by Phillip Avalon.

== Cast ==
- Phillip Avalon
- Guy Peniston-Bird
- David Callcot
- Lorna Lesley

== Production ==
Avalon got the idea to make the film after reading a newspaper article about women being lured into white slavery in Arab countries. He wrote the script and set about trying to raise finance. He ended up financing most of the film himself with earnings from acting and modelling, $36,000 in all. He know the director, Alan Dickie, from working in commercials.

Filming began in May 1975.

Avalon produced the film using volunteers and borrowed equipment, and was shot on weekends. It was a twenty-day shoot over eight weekends and four public holidays. Some scenes were shot in a Kings Cross nightclub, The Cauldron. Rudolph Nureyev, who was touring Australia had the time, had been impressed by Avalon's nude centrefold in Cleo and agreed to do a cameo.

== Reception ==
The film was never commercially released. Avalon ran out of funds at the end of editing and did not have money to do a sound mix and movie score. However the film launched his producing career.
