= Great Expectations (musical) =

Music by Cyril Ornadel and lyrics by Hal Shaper

Great Expectations is a musical with music by Cyril Ornadel and book and lyrics by Hal Shaper based on Charles Dickens' 1861 novel of the same name.

The original production featuring Sir John Mills opened at the Yvonne Arnaud Theatre, Guildford in December 1975 before touring to other British cities and in Canada.

A revised version was performed at the Liverpool Playhouse in 1989 and at the Seymour Centre, Sydney in 1991.

Great Expectations received an Ivor Novello Award for Best British Musical in 1976.
