= Richard Mercer (radio host) =

Australian radio presenter

Richard Mercer is an Australian radio presenter.

Mercer hosted nights on Mix 106.5 from July 1997 until December 2013. His show mostly consisted of the segment 'Love Song Dedications', where listeners would call in to tell Mercer about their love life, and then ask for him to play a song, dedicated to somebody they loved. After Mercer left Mix 106.5, he moved to sister Australian Radio Network station 101.7 WSFM before leaving at the end of 2015.

Prior to hosting Love Song Dedications, Richard was program director and morning announcer at 2KA Penrith (starting in 1984), then it's conversion to ONE FM 96.1, until April 1997.

Mercer is in a relationship with a person named Cherin, who he dedicated many songs to over the years but it was Cherin who dedicated the last Love Song Dedication to Mercer. The song was “How would I live”.
