= This Love Affair =

1974 Australian anthology TV series

- No. of seasons: 1
- No. of episodes: 12

Production
- Executive producer: Oscar Whitbread
- Running time: 50 mins
- Production company: Australia

Original release
- Network: ABC
- Release: 14 April – 30 June 1974

This Love Affair is a 1974 Australian anthology TV series. The plays were mostly made in the Melbourne studios.

It is not to be confused with A Time for Love (1972).

== Cast ==
- Abigail as Laura
- Alan Oram as Ernie
- Arna-Maria Winchester as Diane
- Ben Gabriel
- Berrie Cameron-Allen as Typist
- Diane Craig
- Donna Akerson as Girl
- Elizabeth Alexander
- Elspeth Ballantyne as Laura
- Leonard Teale as John Stewart
- James Davern as Sydney Ferry Driver
- John Clayton
- Michael Duffield as Birdey Wilson
- Michael Long
- Norman Spartels as Athlete
- Olivia Hamnett as Nadine Rourke
- Patsy King
- Sonia Borg as Kris
- Ted Roberts
- Terence Donovan as Cab driver

== Episodes ==
1. Talk of a Running Man (14 April) w John Cribbins d David Stevens - an athlete (Norman Spartels) who has been bullied falls for a girl (Donna Akerson)
2. Tilting at Windmills (21 April) w Mark Randell d David Zweck - a salesgirl Laura (Abigail) falls for a poet John Stewart (Leonard Teale). Co-starring Elspeth Ballantyne.
3. Good Time Charlie the Chequer Cab Kid (28 April) w John Romeril - a man (Terence Donovan) who drives a cab falls for Diane (Anna Marie Winchester)
4. No Thanks I'm on a Diet (5 May) w Margaret Kelly d Keith Wilkes - st a plump typist (Berrie Cameron-Allen) goes on a diet
5. That Old Double Standard (12 May) w Margaret Kelly - a man asks his girlfriend to move out when he is visited by his aunt
6. Seven Tenths of a Second (19 May) w Sonia Borg - Kris is going to marry Colin until seven tenths of a second change everything
7. A Prophet of Love (26 May) - a former journalists struggles with being a mother
8. One of My Silly Dreams (2 June) w James Davern - the driver of a Sydney ferry dreams of retiring to the Pacific.
9. This Time Next Year (9 June) w Ted Roberts - a newcomer to a retirement village, Hannah, is irritated by the attitude of her companions
10. Diversion (16 June) w Alan Oram - Ernie, a shy tailor, invites a client's daughter to a dinner but his friend monopolises her attention
11. A Family Christmas (23 June) by Roger Dunn - Jan returns from England with her husband
12. Autumn Roses (30 June) by Judy Blerworth - a love affair between two rose growers
