= List of Play School episodes =

Play School is an Australian children's television series produced by the Australian Broadcasting Corporation which first aired in 1966.

The series marked its 60th anniversary in 2026.

== Series overview ==
Series	Episodes	Originally released	
Series	Episodes	First released	Last released
54	20	8 July 2019	18 December 2020
55	20	2 April 2020	27 May 2021
56	20	7 June 2021	1 April 2022
57	20	2 May 2022	24 February 2023
58	25	12 June 2023	30 December 2023
59	25	27 May 2024	19 March 2025
60	30	5 May 2025	8 May 2026
61	TBA	13 July 2026	TBA

== Series 54 (2019–2020) ==
No. overall	No. in series	Title	Series Title	Directed by	Written by	Original release date
–	–	"Acknowledgement of Country"	–	Unknown	Unknown	8 July 2019
–	–	"Beginnings and Endings"	–	Unknown	Unknown	19 August 2019
–	–	"Get Ready for Bed"	–	Unknown	Unknown	7 October 2019
–	–	"A Very Play School Christmas"	–	Unknown	Unknown	16 December 2019
341–1	1	"The Bush"	Going Wild	Unknown	Unknown	27 January 2020
341–2	2	"The Ocean"	Going Wild	Unknown	Unknown	28 January 2020
341–3	3	"The Rainforest"	Going Wild	Unknown	Unknown	29 January 2020
341–4	4	"The Arctic"	Going Wild	Unknown	Unknown	30 January 2020
341–5	5	"The Savannah"	Going Wild	Unknown	Unknown	31 January 2020
340–1	6	"Appearance"	Same and Different	Unknown	Unknown	30 March 2020
340–2	7	"Sport and Games"	Same and Different	Unknown	Unknown	31 March 2020
340–3	8	"Movement"	Same and Different	Unknown	Unknown	1 April 2020
340–4	9	"Communication"	Same and Different	Unknown	Unknown	2 April 2020
340–5	10	"Dance"	Same and Different	Unknown	Unknown	3 April 2020
342–1	11	"Symbols and Emojis"	Connect and Play	Unknown	Unknown	18 May 2020
342–2	12	"Voice and Video Messages"	Connect and Play	Unknown	Unknown	19 May 2020
342–3	13	"Animal Communication"	Connect and Play	Unknown	Unknown	20 May 2020
342–4	14	"Writing"	Connect and Play	Unknown	Unknown	21 May 2020
342–5	15	"Movement"	Connect and Play	Unknown	Unknown	22 May 2020
343–1	16	"Birthdays"	Our Celebrations	Unknown	Unknown	14 December 2020
343–2	17	"Lunar New Year"	Our Celebrations	Unknown	Unknown	15 December 2020
343–3	18	"Diwali"	Our Celebrations	Unknown	Unknown	16 December 2020
343–4	19	"NAIDOC Week"	Our Celebrations	Unknown	Unknown	17 December 2020
343–5	20	"Eid Al-Fitr"	Our Celebrations	Unknown	Unknown	18 December 2020

== Series 55 (2020–2021) ==
No. overall	No. in series	Title	Series Title	Directed by	Written by	Original release date
–	–	"Hello Friends! A COVID-19 Special"	–	Unknown	Unknown	2 April 2020
–	–	"Mindfully Me"	–	Unknown	Unknown	6 April 2020
–	–	"ANZAC Day Special"	–	Unknown	Unknown	24 April 2020
–	–	"Kiya's Excellent eBirthday"	–	Unknown	Unknown	27 April 2020
–	–	"Hello Again! A COVID-19 Special"	–	Unknown	Unknown	3 June 2020
345–1	1	"Astronauts and Divers"	Sea and Space	Unknown	Unknown	27 July 2020
345–2	2	"Bathyal Zone"	Sea and Space	Unknown	Unknown	28 July 2020
345–3	3	"Sea Animals"	Sea and Space	Unknown	Unknown	29 July 2020
345–4	4	"Meteors"	Sea and Space	Unknown	Unknown	30 July 2020
345–5	5	"Volcanoes"	Sea and Space	Unknown	Unknown	31 July 2020
346–1	6	"Cradle Mountain"	Rain, Hail or Shine	Unknown	Unknown	9 November 2020
346–2	7	"Beechworth"	Rain, Hail or Shine	Unknown	Unknown	10 November 2020
346–3	8	"Wallaman Falls"	Rain, Hail or Shine	Unknown	Unknown	11 November 2020
346–4	9	"Tennant Creek"	Rain, Hail or Shine	Unknown	Unknown	12 November 2020
346–5	10	"Noongar Country"	Rain, Hail or Shine	Unknown	Unknown	13 November 2020
–	–	"Ready, Set, Big School"	–	Unknown	Unknown	7 December 2020
348–1	11	"Firefighters"	Everyday Helpers	Unknown	Unknown	22 February 2021
348–2	12	"Police"	Everyday Helpers	Unknown	Unknown	23 February 2021
348–3	13	"Nurses and Doctors"	Everyday Helpers	Unknown	Unknown	24 February 2021
348–4	14	"SES"	Everyday Helpers	Unknown	Unknown	25 February 2021
348–5	15	"Red Cross"	Everyday Helpers	Unknown	Unknown	26 February 2021
347–1	16	"Pets"	Where I Belong	Unknown	Unknown	12 April 2021
347–2	17	"Grandparents"	Where I Belong	Unknown	Unknown	13 April 2021
347–3	18	"Community Gardens"	Where I Belong	Unknown	Unknown	14 April 2021
347–4	19	"Friends"	Where I Belong	Unknown	Unknown	15 April 2021
347–5	20	"Learning at School"	Where I Belong	Unknown	Unknown	16 April 2021
–	–	"Walking Together"	–	Unknown	Unknown	27 May 2021

== Series 56 (2021–2022) ==
No. overall	No. in series	Title	Series Title	Directed by	Written by	Original release date
349–1	1	"Compost and Food Waste"	Green Team	Unknown	Unknown	7 June 2021
349–2	2	"Clean Water"	Green Team	Unknown	Unknown	8 June 2021
349–3	3	"Recycling"	Green Team	Unknown	Unknown	9 June 2021
349–4	4	"Bees and Energy"	Green Team	Unknown	Unknown	10 June 2021
349–5	5	"Native Plants and Seeds"	Green Team	Unknown	Unknown	11 June 2021
–	–	"The Very Silly Special"	–	Unknown	Unknown	18 July 2021
350–1	6	"Egypt"	Wonderful World	Unknown	Unknown	6 September 2021
350–2	7	"Italy"	Wonderful World	Unknown	Unknown	7 September 2021
350–3	8	"England"	Wonderful World	Unknown	Unknown	8 September 2021
350–4	9	"Greece"	Wonderful World	Unknown	Unknown	9 September 2021
350–5	10	"India"	Wonderful World	Unknown	Unknown	10 September 2021
352–1	11	"Sorting"	Marvellous Maths	Unknown	Unknown	13 December 2021
352–2	12	"Weight and Size"	Marvellous Maths	Unknown	Unknown	14 December 2021
352–3	13	"Counting"	Marvellous Maths	Unknown	Unknown	15 December 2021
352–4	14	"Measuring"	Marvellous Maths	Unknown	Unknown	16 December 2021
352–5	15	"Shapes"	Marvellous Maths	Unknown	Unknown	17 December 2021
–	–	"Let's Eat"	–	Unknown	Unknown	10 January 2022
354–1	16	"Aposematism and Camouflage"	Colours All Around	Unknown	Unknown	28 March 2022
354–2	17	"Gardens"	Colours All Around	Unknown	Unknown	29 March 2022
354–3	18	"Sky and Sea"	Colours All Around	Unknown	Unknown	30 March 2022
354–4	19	"Earth and Trees"	Colours All Around	Unknown	Unknown	31 March 2022
354–5	20	"Light Spectrum"	Colours All Around	Unknown	Unknown	1 April 2022

== Series 57 (2022–2023) ==
No. overall	No. in series	Title	Series Title	Directed by	Written by	Original release date
355–1	1	"China"	Wonderful World 2	Ian Munro	Angela Moore	2 May 2022
Presenters: Karen Pang and Alex Papps; Guest: Eric Mao
355–2	2	"South Africa"	Wonderful World 2	Ian Munro	Carlo Ritchie	3 May 2022
Presenters: Emma Palmer and Hunter Page-Lochard; Guest: Siphephiso Magonya
355–3	3	"Japan"	Wonderful World 2	Ian Munro	Emma Palmer	4 May 2022
Presenters: Michelle Lim Davidson and Alex Papps
355–4	3	"Peru"	Wonderful World 2	Ian Munro	Dylan Van Den Berg	5 May 2022
Presenters: Rachael Coopes and Michelle Lim Davidson; Guests: Hansel Jimenez and Victor Jimenez
355–5	5	"Canada"	Wonderful World 2	Ian Munro	Angela Moore	6 May 2022
Presenters: Luke Carroll and Hunter Page-Lochard
–	–	"Very Jazzy Street Party"	–	Ian Munro	Angela Moore	1 July 2022
Presenters: Matthew Backer, Justine Clarke and Michelle Lim Davidson; Guest: Monica Trapaga
–	–	"Yarning and Dreaming"	–	Ian Munro	Dylan Van Den Berg	4 August 2022
Presenters: Miah Madden and Luke Carroll; Guest: Christine Anu
353–1	6	"Television"	Lights, Camera, Action!	Ian Munro	Emma Palmer	22 August 2022
Presenters: Miah Madden and Teo Gebert
353–2	7	"Theatre"	Lights, Camera, Action!	Ian Munro	Belinda Barancewicz	23 August 2022
Presenters: Michelle Lim Davidson and Matthew Backer
353–3	8	"Radio"	Lights, Camera, Action!	Ian Munro	Carlo Ritchie	24 August 2022
Presenters: Rachael Coopes and Luke Carroll
353–4	9	"Animation"	Lights, Camera, Action!	Ian Munro	Angela Moore; Emma Palmer	25 August 2022
Presenters: Emma Palmer and Matthew Backer
353–5	10	"Film"	Lights, Camera, Action!	Ian Munro	Emma Palmer	26 August 2022
Presenters: Rachael Coopes and Kaeng Chan; Guests: Natalia Ladyko and Rachelle Tiah
356–1	11	"Home"	Big and Small	Ian Munro	Dylan Van Den Berg	12 December 2022
Presenters: Miah Madden and Teo Gebert; Guest: Suzi Attard
356–2	12	"Garden"	Big and Small	Ian Munro	Emma Palmer	13 December 2022
Presenters: Leah Vandenberg and Luke Carroll
356–3	13	"Sea"	Big and Small	Ian Munro	Angela Moore	14 December 2022
Presenters: Michelle Lim Davidson and Miah Madden
356–4	14	"City"	Big and Small	Ian Munro	Belinda Barancewicz	15 December 2022
Presenters: Emma Palmer and Matthew Backer
356–5	15	"Outback"	Big and Small	Ian Munro	Carlo Ritchie	16 December 2022
Presenters: Rachael Coopes and Luke Carroll
–	–	"Down on the Farm"	–	Hattie Archibald	Vanessa Bates	28 November 2022
Presenters: Abi Tucker and Michelle Lim Davidson
–	–	"Summer Road Trip"	–	Ian Munro	Johanna Garvin; Emma Palmer	26 December 2022
Presenters: Emma Palmer, Matthew Backer and Kaeng Chan
357–1	16	"Mammals and Marsupials"	Amazing Animals	Kate Douglas-Walker	Carlo Ritchie	20 February 2023
Presenters: Zindzi Okenyo and Teo Gebert; Guest: Ben Dessen
357–2	17	"Birds"	Amazing Animals	Kate Douglas-Walker	Angela Moore	21 February 2023
Presenters: Emma Palmer and Kaeng Chan; Guests: Ben Dessen and Maralma King
357–3	18	"Reptiles"	Amazing Animals	Kate Douglas-Walker	Angela Moore	22 February 2023
Presenters: Miah Madden and Matthew Backer; Guest: Ben Dessen
357–4	19	"Amphibians"	Amazing Animals	Kate Douglas-Walker	Dylan Van Den Berg	23 February 2023
Presenters: Rachael Coopes and Matthew Backer; Guest: Ben Dessen
357–5	20	"Fish"	Amazing Animals	Kate Douglas-Walker	Emma Palmer	24 February 2023
Presenters: Michelle Lim Davidson and Kaeng Chan; Guest: Ben Dessen

== Series 58 (2023) ==
No. overall	No. in series	Title	Series Title	Directed by	Written by	Original release date
358–1	1	"On the Road"	Let's Take a Ride	Unknown	Unknown	12 June 2023
358–2	2	"Amazing Trains"	Let's Take a Ride	Unknown	Unknown	13 June 2023
358–3	3	"Up in the Air"	Let's Take a Ride	Unknown	Unknown	14 June 2023
358–4	4	"On the Water"	Let's Take a Ride	Unknown	Unknown	15 June 2023
358–5	5	"Fun Rides"	Let's Take a Ride	Unknown	Unknown	16 June 2023
359–1	6	"Dino Eggs"	Dinosaur Roar	Unknown	Unknown	17 July 2023
359–2	7	"Dino Museum"	Dinosaur Roar	Unknown	Unknown	18 July 2023
359–3	8	"Polar Dinos"	Dinosaur Roar	Unknown	Unknown	19 July 2023
359–4	9	"Dino Fossils"	Dinosaur Roar	Unknown	Unknown	20 July 2023
359–5	10	"Soar and Splash"	Dinosaur Roar	Unknown	Unknown	21 July 2023
360–1	11	"Home by Night"	World by Night	Unknown	Unknown	14 August 2023
360–2	12	"Natural World"	World by Night	Unknown	Unknown	15 August 2023
360–3	13	"Buildings and Cities"	World by Night	Unknown	Unknown	16 August 2023
360–4	14	"The Night Sky"	World by Night	Unknown	Unknown	17 August 2023
360–5	15	"Out About at Night"	World by Night	Unknown	Unknown	18 August 2023
–	–	"Humpty and Dad"	–	Unknown	Unknown	3 September 2023
361–1	16	"Harmony and Melody"	Let the Music Play	Unknown	Unknown	13 November 2023
361–2	17	"Rhythm and Dance"	Let the Music Play	Unknown	Unknown	14 November 2023
361–3	18	"Loud and Soft (Dynamics)"	Let the Music Play	Unknown	Unknown	15 November 2023
361–4	19	"Beats and Percussion"	Let the Music Play	Unknown	Unknown	16 November 2023
361–5	20	"Playing Together"	Let the Music Play	Unknown	Unknown	17 November 2023
362–1	21	"Discovery at the Beach"	Down at the Beach	Unknown	Unknown	26 December 2023
362–2	22	"Sea Creatures at the Beach"	Down at the Beach	Unknown	Unknown	27 December 2023
362–3	23	"Games at the Beach"	Down at the Beach	Unknown	Unknown	28 December 2023
362–4	24	"Jobs at the Beach"	Down at the Beach	Unknown	Unknown	29 December 2023
362–5	25	"Looking After the Beach"	Down at the Beach	Unknown	Unknown	30 December 2023

== Series 59 (2024–2025) ==
The series of episodes titled "Big Ted's Time Machine", which aired in May 2024, was nominated for an AACTA Award for Best Children's Program in 2025. A special titled All Together aired on 19 March 2025, which featured themes of allyship and friendship, and was written by presenter Leah Vandenberg. The special won an AACTA Award for Best Children's Program in 2026.

No. overall	No. in series	Title	Series Title	Directed by	Written by	Original release date
366–1	1	"Rockin' '50s"	Big Ted's Time Machine	Ian Munro	Angela Moore	27 May 2024
Presenters: Abi Tucker and Nicholas Brown; Guest: Don Spencer
366–2	2	"Swinging '60s"	Big Ted's Time Machine	Ian Munro	Carlo Ritchie	28 May 2024
Presenters: Justine Clarke and Alex Papps; Guest: Monica Trapaga
366–3	3	"Groovy '70s"	Big Ted's Time Machine	Ian Munro	Emma Palmer	29 May 2024
Presenters: Miah Madden and Rachael Coopes; Guest: Georgie Parker
366–4	4	"Rad '80s"	Big Ted's Time Machine	Ian Munro	Lewis Hobba	30 May 2024
Presenters: Emma Palmer and Teo Gebert; Guests: George Spartels and Shannon Dooley
366–5	5	"Fantastic Future"	Big Ted's Time Machine	Ian Munro	Emma Palmer	31 May 2024
Presenters: Kaeng Chan and Luke Carroll; Guest: Kirli Saunders
367–1	6	"Track and Field"	Let the Games Begin	Hattie Archibald	Angela Moore	29 July 2024
Presenters: Leah Vandenberg and Luke Carroll; Guests: Calab Law and Tanya Hennessy
367–2	7	"Water Sports"	Let the Games Begin	Hattie Archibald	Emma Palmer	30 July 2024
Presenters: Miah Madden and Zindzi Okenyo; Guests: Sam Fricker and Tanya Hennessy
367–3	8	"Ball Sports"	Let the Games Begin	Hattie Archibald	Emma Palmer	31 July 2024
Presenters: Abi Tucker and Kaeng Chan; Guests: Jada Whyman, Abbey Lemon and Tanya Hennessy
367–4	9	"Solo and Team Sports"	Let the Games Begin	Hattie Archibald	Emma Hanna	1 August 2024
Presenters: Matthew Backer and Nicholas Brown; Guests: Dylan Alcott and Tanya Hennessy
367–5	10	"Backyard Games"	Let the Games Begin	Hattie Archibald	Angela Moore	2 August 2024
Presenters: Leah Vandenberg and Teo Gebert; Guest: Tanya Hennessy
368–1	11	"Brekky Time"	What's Cooking?	Unknown	Unknown	16 September 2024
368–2	12	"Munchy Crunchy Lunch"	What's Cooking?	Unknown	Unknown	17 September 2024
368–3	13	"Sip and Snack"	What's Cooking?	Unknown	Unknown	18 September 2024
368–4	14	"Delicious Dinner"	What's Cooking?	Unknown	Unknown	19 September 2024
368–5	15	"Dreamy Desserts"	What's Cooking?	Unknown	Unknown	20 September 2024
–	–	"The Not Too Spooky Special"	–	Ian Munro	Lewis Hobba	18 October 2024
Presenters: Matthew Backer, Rachael Coopes and Eddie Perfect; Guest: Jenny Ellis
369–1	16	"Colourful and Camouflaging Insects"	Interesting Insects	Unknown	Unknown	25 November 2024
369–2	17	"Fast and Slow Insects"	Interesting Insects	Unknown	Unknown	26 November 2024
369–3	18	"Wet and Dry Insects"	Interesting Insects	Unknown	Unknown	27 November 2024
369–4	19	"Noisy and Quiet Insects"	Interesting Insects	Unknown	Unknown	28 November 2024
369–5	20	"Daytime and Nighttime Insects"	Interesting Insects	Unknown	Unknown	29 November 2024
–	–	"Growing Strong"	–	Ian Munro	Angela Moore	3 February 2025
Presenters: Leah Vandenberg, Teo Gebert and Miah Madden; Guests: Tessa Lavender, Isaac Trainer and Maurice Swao
370–1	21	"Mighty Moving Machines"	Mighty Machines	Hattie Archibald	Angela Moore	24 February 2025
Presenters: Teo Gebert and Abi Tucker
370–2	22	"Mighty Zooming Machines"	Mighty Machines	Hattie Archibald	Kirli Saunders	25 February 2025
Presenters: Emma Palmer and Andrew McFarlane; Guest: Katherine Bennell-Pegg
370–3	23	"Mighty Helpful Machines"	Mighty Machines	Hattie Archibald	Emma Hanna	26 February 2025
Presenters: Leah Vandenberg and Alex Papps
370–4	24	"Mighty Hardworking Machines"	Mighty Machines	Hattie Archibald	Lewis Hobba	27 February 2025
Presenters: Michelle Lim Davidson and Takaya Honda
370–5	25	"Mighty Playful Machines"	Mighty Machines	Hattie Archibald	Carlo Ritchie	28 February 2025
Presenters: Matthew Backer and Zindzi Okenyo
–	–	"All Together"	–	Hattie Archibald	Leah Vandenberg	19 March 2025
Presenters: Alex Papps, Miah Madden, Michelle Lim Davidson, Teo Gebert and Zindzi Okenyo

== Series 60 (2025–2026) ==
The "Humpty's Big Book of Nursery Rhymes" series aired from 16 to 20 February 2026, featured five former presenters as guests, and debuted a new opening title sequence produced by Studio Gilay. It was accompanied by a physical book of the same name, which was released on 29 September 2026.

No. overall	No. in series	Title	Series Title	Directed by	Written by	Original release date
371–1	1	"Clever Creatives"	When I Grow Up	Ian Munro	Emma Palmer	5 May 2025
Presenters: Justine Clarke and Alex Papps; Guest: Tim Minchin
371–2	2	"Health Care Helpers"	When I Grow Up	Ian Munro	Carlo Ritchie	6 May 2025
Presenters: Matthew Backer and Alex Papps; Guest: Ari Tam
371–3	3	"Wonderful Whizzes"	When I Grow Up	Ian Munro	Angela Moore	7 May 2025
Presenters: Teo Gebert and Michelle Lim Davidson; Guest: Nate Byrne
371–4	4	"Super Services"	When I Grow Up	Ian Munro	Emma Hanna	8 May 2025
Presenters: Leah Vandenberg and Rachael Coopes
371–5	5	"Nature Nurturers"	When I Grow Up	Ian Munro	Lewis Hobba	9 May 2025
Presenters: Miah Madden and Kaeng Chan; Guest: Adam Goodes
372–1	6	"City Living"	My Place, My Home	Hattie Archibald	Lewis Hobba	9 June 2025
Presenters: Michelle Lim Davidson and Kaeng Chan; Teo's Travels: Teo Gebert; Guest: John Martin
372–2	7	"Coastal Breeze"	My Place, My Home	Hattie Archibald	Kylie Bracknell	10 June 2025
Presenters: Miah Madden and Matthew Backer; Teo's Travels: Teo Gebert; Guest: Dustin Maloney
372–3	8	"Island Life"	My Place, My Home	Hattie Archibald	Jasmin McCaughey	11 June 2025
Presenters: Alex Papps and Rachael Coopes; Teo's Travels: Teo Gebert; Guests: Charles Passi, Laurie Nona and Nabako Laza
372–4	9	"The Great Outback"	My Place, My Home	Hattie Archibald	Kirli Saunders	12 June 2025
Presenters: Abi Tucker and Hunter Page-Lochard; Teo's Travels: Teo Gebert; Guest: Renate Johnny
372–5	10	"Country Charm"	My Place, My Home	Hattie Archibald	Carlo Ritchie	13 June 2025
Presenters: Miah Madden and Nicholas Brown; Teo's Travels: Teo Gebert; Guest: Deb Morley
373–1	11	"Farmyard Friends"	Playtime with Pets	Ian Munro	Carlo Ritchie	22 September 2025
Presenters: Alex Papps and Michelle Lim Davidson
373–2	12	"Little Friends"	Playtime with Pets	Ian Munro	Amy Stewart	23 September 2025
Presenters: Emma Palmer and Takaya Honda
373–3	13	"Scaly Friends"	Playtime with Pets	Ian Munro	Emma Hanna	24 September 2025
Presenters: Abi Tucker and Teo Gebert
373–4	14	"Aquatic Friends"	Playtime with Pets	Ian Munro	Angela Moore	25 September 2025
Presenters: Rachael Coopes and Emma Palmer
373–5	15	"Furry Friends"	Playtime with Pets	Ian Munro	Jasmin McGaughey	26 September 2025
Presenters: Kaeng Chan and Takaya Honda
374–1	16	"Natural Creators"	Make and Create	Hattie Archibald	Lewis Hobba	3 November 2025
Presenters: Abi Tucker and Takaya Honda; Guest: Tegan Murdock
374–2	17	"Curious Thinkers"	Make and Create	Hattie Archibald	Kirli Saunders	4 November 2025
Presenters: Emma Palmer and Kaeng Chan; Guest: Maddie Massy
374–3	18	"Recycling Inventors"	Make and Create	Hattie Archibald	Emma Palmer	5 November 2025
Presenters: Alex Papps and Teo Gebert; Guest: Eddie Scarborough
374–4	19	"Crafty Artists"	Make and Create	Hattie Archibald	Kylie Bracknell	6 November 2025
Presenters: Rachael Coopes and Teo Gebert
374–5	20	"Foodie Makers"	Make and Create	Hattie Archibald	Carlo Ritchie	7 November 2025
Presenters: Zindzi Okenyo and Alex Papps; Guest: Dave Yan
375–1	21	"Nautical Rhymes"	Humpty's Big Book of Nursery Rhymes	Ian Munro	Carlo Ritchie	16 February 2026
Presenters: Emma Palmer and Alex Papps; Guest: Rhys Muldoon
375–2	22	"Royal Rhymes"	Humpty's Big Book of Nursery Rhymes	Ian Munro	Emma Palmer	17 February 2026
Presenters: Justine Clarke and Teo Gebert; Guest: Jay Laga'aia
375–3	23	"Food and Garden Rhymes"	Humpty's Big Book of Nursery Rhymes	Ian Munro	Benjamin Law	18 February 2026
Presenters: Leah Vandenberg and Kaeng Chan; Guest: Miranda Tapsell
375–4	24	"Animal Rhymes"	Humpty's Big Book of Nursery Rhymes	Ian Munro	Angela Moore	19 February 2026
Presenters: Rachael Coopes and Matthew Backer; Guest: John Waters
375–5	25	"Nighttime and Lullaby Rhymes"	Humpty's Big Book of Nursery Rhymes	Ian Munro	Jasmin McGaughey	20 February 2026
Presenters: Michelle Lim Davidson and Luke Carroll; Guest: Sofya Gollan
376–1	26	"Animals of the Rainforest"	Rainforest Rangers	Ian Munro	Lewis Hobba	4 May 2026
Presenters: Justine Clarke and Kaeng Chan
376–2	27	"Layers of the Rainforest"	Rainforest Rangers	Ian Munro	Emma Hanna	5 May 2026
Presenters: Alex Papps and Miah Madden
376–3	28	"Plants of the Rainforest"	Rainforest Rangers	Sofya Gollan	Emma Palmer	6 May 2026
Presenters: Takaya Honda and Zindzi Okenyo
376–4	29	"Weather of the Rainforest"	Rainforest Rangers	Ian Munro	Jasmine McGaughey	7 May 2026
Presenters: Abi Tucker and Luke Carroll
376–5	30	"Caring for the Rainforest"	Rainforest Rangers	Ian Munro	Carlo Ritchie	8 May 2026
Presenters: Leah Vandenberg and Luke Carroll

== Series 61 (2026) ==
Play School marked its 60th anniversary on 18 July 2026. The "Party Animals!" series aired from 13 to 17 July 2026, themed around different parties. A series titled "Sensational Senses", which aired from 17 to 21 August 2026, was directed by former deaf presenter Sofya Gollan and features picture-in-picture guest appearances from various Auslan translators. Deaf interpreter Vanessa Alford also made her debut in this series as a regular presenter. The series won Best Children's Program at the 2026 Logie Awards.

No. overall	No. in series	Title	Series Title	Directed by	Written by	Original release date
377–1	1	"Arty Party"	Party Animals!	Ian Munro	Lewis Hobba	13 July 2026
Presenters: Abi Tucker and Alex Papps
377–2	2	"Superhero Party"	Party Animals!	Ian Munro	Carlo Ritchie	14 July 2026
Presenters: Matthew Backer and Michelle Lim Davidson
377–3	3	"Space Explorers Party"	Party Animals!	Ian Munro	Angela Moore	15 July 2026
Presenters: Michelle Lim Davidson and Takaya Honda
377–4	4	"Animal Party"	Party Animals!	Ian Munro	Jasmin McGaughey	16 July 2026
Presenters: Emma Palmer and Teo Gebert
377–5	5	"Move and Groove Party"	Party Animals!	Ian Munro	Emma Palmer	17 July 2026
Presenters: Kaeng Chan and Zindzi Okenyo
378–1	6	"Sniff and Imagine"	Sensational Senses	Sofya Gollan	Emma Hanna	17 August 2026
Presenters: Emma Palmer and Takaya Honda; Auslan Translator: Fallon Simchowitz
378–2	7	"Listen and Balance"	Sensational Senses	Sofya Gollan	Lewis Hobba	18 August 2026
Presenters: Alex Papps, Rachael Coopes and Vanessa Alford; Auslan Translator: Julia Murphy
378–3	8	"Look and Discover"	Sensational Senses	Sofya Gollan	Amy Stewart	19 August 2026
Presenters: Alex Papps and Leah Vandenberg; Auslan Translator: Melissa Kennewell
378–4	9	"Touch, Feel and Move"	Sensational Senses	Sofya Gollan	Kirli Saunders	20 August 2026
Presenters: Abi Tucker and Matthew Backer; Auslan Translator: Oliad Omar
378–5	10	"Taste and Try"	Sensational Senses	Sofya Gollan	Benjamin Law	21 August 2026
Presenters: Miah Madden and Kaeng Chan; Auslan Translator: David Grant
379–1	11	"Bush Bonanza"	Magnificent Monsters and More!	Ian Munro	Kirli Saunders	26 October 2026 (Note: This episode was first released on ABC iview on 1 October 2026.)
Presenters: Abi Tucker and Albert Mwangi
379–2	12	"Fantastical Fairyland"	Magnificent Monsters and More!	Ian Munro	Angela Moore	27 October 2026
Presenters: Justine Clarke and Alex Papps
379–3	13	"Swooshy Sea Monsters"	Magnificent Monsters and More!	Ian Munro	Carlo Ritchie	28 October 2026
Presenters: Rachael Coopes and Takaya Honda
379–4	14	"Lights, Camera, Monsters!"	Magnificent Monsters and More!	Ian Munro	Emma Hanna	29 October 2026
Presenters: Emma Palmer and Teo Gebert
379–5	15	"Sparkly Sea Monsters"	Magnificent Monsters and More!	Ian Munro	Benjamin Law	30 October 2026
Presenters: Kaeng Chan and Leah Vandenberg
–	–	"The Super Silly Special"	–	Todd Decker	Emma Palmer	15 November 2026
Presenters: Eddie Perfect, Kaeng Chan, Rachael Coopes, Teo Gebert and Zindzi Okenyo
TBA	TBA	TBA	Things to Do	TBA	TBA	TBA
TBA	TBA	TBA	Things to Do	TBA	TBA	TBA
TBA	TBA	TBA	Things to Do	TBA	TBA	TBA
TBA	TBA	TBA	Things to Do	TBA	TBA	TBA
TBA	TBA	TBA	Things to Do	TBA	TBA	TBA
381–1	TBA	"Growing Bodies"	My Body, Your Body	TBA	TBA	TBA
381–2	TBA	"Moving Bodies"	My Body, Your Body	TBA	TBA	TBA
381–3	TBA	TBA	My Body, Your Body	TBA	TBA	TBA
381–4	TBA	TBA	My Body, Your Body	TBA	TBA	TBA
381–5	TBA	"Ageing Bodies"	My Body, Your Body	TBA	TBA	TBA
