= Alister Smart =

Australian television director, actor and presenter (1935–2026)

- Born: 28 July 1935; Adelaide, South Australia, Australia
- Died: 9 September 2026 (aged 91); Bairnsdale, Victoria, Australia
- Other name: Alastair Smart
- Occupations: Actor; television presenter; television director; writer
- Years active: Actor (1953–1992); Television presenter (1966–1989, 1991); Television director (1972–1994); Screenwriter (various)
- Employer: Australian Broadcasting Corporation (1966–1991)
- Known for: Play School as host (1966–1988)
- Notable work: Number 96 (TV and film); The Sullivans; Sons and Daughters as director (88 episodes)

Alister Smart (28 July 1935 – 9 September 2026) also credited as Alastair Smart, was an Australian actor, television presenter and television director and screenwriter. He started his career in theatre in the early 1950s, and also appeared in television productions in Australia and the UK from the 1950s until the mid-1990s.

Smart was best known for his role as an original presenter on ABC's version of children's series Play School, from 1966 to 1989 (guest episodes 1991, repeated episodes featuring Smart appeared until 1993) and for directing numerous episodes of series Sons and Daughters and briefly Blue Heelers (4 episodes).

Despite his friendly persona as a Play School presenter, Smart acknowledged that he more often than not played villainous roles.

== Biography ==
=== Early life and acting ===
Smart was born in Adelaide, Australia on 28 July 1935. Initially after leaving school, he joined his family business of building, restoring and tuning pianos, which sparked an interest in becoming a professional pianist and he studied at the Sydney Conservatorium of Music.

Smart started in amateur dramatics, after appearing in a production of Dragon's Mouth he travelled to England and started his career there in 1953, in French playwright Jean Cocteau's L'Aigle à deux têtes (The Eagle with Two Heads), at the Everyman Theatre, Cheltenham. He also appeared in productions like Winter's Journey and Three Sisters.

After returning to Australia he appeared in a production of Shakespeare's Macbeth and Jean Anouilh's The Lark.

In 1960, Smart returned to the United Kingdom and appeared in theatre roles in Filumena Marturano at the Belgrade Theatre, Coventry and the James Bridie written Mr. Bolfrey, performing and touring with England's only theatre on wheels, the Century Theatre Company based in Leicester, whilst he expanded his career to television in England, where he appeared in televised plays and series, including comedy The Seven Faces of Jim and featuring in anthology teleplay series including ITV Play of the Week and Comedy Playhouse and dramas like Emergency Ward 10.

An early television role for Smart when returning to Australia was the 1963 teleplay The Right Thing, the ABC's first TV drama co-production with an international company, in which he played the role of visiting Spaniard, Jose.

He returned to Australia in 1963 and featured in a theatre production of King Henry VI in 1964 and toured in Edward Albee's Who's Afraid of Virginia Woolf? in 1965 and recreated his role in Henrik Ibsen's Three Sisters in 1966.

Smart appeared in guest roles in soap operas and made for-television movies, including 1966's The House for anthology serial Australian Playhouse, playing the role of an abusive husband, opposite Nancye Stewart. In 1969, he appeared in the film It Takes All Kinds, playing the role of Ray.

He had a prominent role as a new character, in the film version of series Number 96 as newspaper journalist Duncan Hunter, the new husband of Sonia (Lynn Rainbow), whom with Diana Moore is trying to send her insane in order to gain her late husband's inheritance. He later appeared in the series the film was based on, playing Frank Hobson, a married man who has an affair with Jane Chester (Suzanne Church) in 1976.

The following year, he had a role in the TV movie Roses Bloom Twice and in 1978, he played the role of Stewart in Plunge Into Darkness.

His other Australian television credits included Riptide, Skippy, The Sullivans, Glenview High, Barrier Reef, Cop Shop and Rafferty's Rules.

=== Television director ===
Smart pursued a career in directing both movies and television series from the early 1970s until his retirement in 1994. His directorial work included notable projects such as the 1975 ABC series sitcom Scattergood: Friend of All, and drama series A Country Practice. He also directed the 1992 made-for-TV family films The Time Game and You and Me and Uncle Bob.

He is best known however for directing the popular 1980s drama series Sons and Daughters, over some 88 episodes.

Other later directing credits included episodes of Richmond Hill, Prisoner, Cop Shop, Rafferty's Rules, E Street, Neighbours and Blue Heelers.

=== Television presenter ===
Smart is known for his role as a presenter on the long-running children's TV program Play School, the Australian adaptation of the original British version of the same title. He made his first appearance in the debut episode in July 1966, and continued in this role for 22 years appearing in over 200 editions and was on air in repeats until he retired in 1993. It was one of the longest stints on television in Australia. During his tenure, he co-hosted alongside Anne Haddy (1966–1969), Lorraine Bayly (1966–1978), Benita Collings, Don Spencer, Jan Kingsbury, John Hamblin, Noni Hazlehurst, John Waters, Philip Quast and during the first year, Diane Dorgan.

He was also recognised for his appearances with fellow Play School hosts, including Don Spencer on tie-in records released for ABC Music, as well as in audiobooks.

=== Personal life and death ===
Smart grew up in Nowra, New South Wales and was married to British actress Margery Milne, whom he met during the early 1960s when they appeared together in a play in Leicester.

In his later years, he resided in East Gippsland, Victoria.

Smart died on 9 September 2026, in Bairnsdale, Victoria, at the age of 91.

== Filmography ==
=== As actor ===
==== Film ====
Year	Title	Role	Type	Ref.
1969	It Takes All Kinds	Ray	Feature film	
1974	Number 96	Duncan Hunter	Film adaptation	
1992	The Girl Who Came Late (aka Daydream Believer)	Ron	Feature film	

==== Television ====
Year	Title	Role	Type	Ref.
1961	The Watchmen of Saul	Building Worker	TV play (episode of Theatre 70)	
1961	Three Live Wires		1 episode	
1961	Countdown at Woomera	Checker	TV play (episode of ITV Play of the Week)	
1961	The Seven Faces of Jim	Kenneth Kendall, Digger, Newspaper reporter	3 episodes	
1962	The Telephone Call		TV play (episode of Comedy Playhouse)	
1962	Drama 61-67	Dr. Jefferson	1 episode	
1962	Six More Faces of Jim		1 episode	
1963	Emergency Ward 10	Mr. Riley	1 episode	
1963	The Right Thing	Jose Gomez	TV play	
1964	Ring Out, Wild Bells	John Lambert	TV play (episode of Wednesday Theatre)	
1965	Arabesque for Atoms		TV play	
1965–1971	Homicide	Doctor Perini, John Whelan, Geoff Woods, Alan Watson, George Allen, Lucio Leurini, John Meadows	7 episodes	
1966	Twelfth Night	Curio	TV play (episode of Wednesday Theatre)	
1966	The House		TV play (episode of Australian Playhouse)	
1966–1993	Play School	Presenter	TV series	
1967	You Can't See 'round Corners		1 episode	
1967	Contrabandits	Greer, Cox	2 episodes	
1968–1969	Skippy the Bush Kangaroo	Alf, Sergeant	2 episodes	
1969	Riptide	Adam Brockenhurst, Les Duggan, Ted	3 episodes	
1969–1975	Division 4	Dennis, Downey; Kenney Kent, Alf Clarke, Stan Hassett, Don Jenkins, Taylor	8 episodes	
1970	The Rovers	Gary	1 episode	
1970	Delta	Paul Falstone-Green	1 episode	
1970	Barrier Reef	Lynch	1 episode	
1970	Dynasty	Ambassador	1 episode	
1971	Spyforce	Carlos	1 episode	
1971; 1973	Matlock Police	Ricco, Barney White	2 episodes	
1973	Ryan	Colin Brown	1 episode	
1973	Serpent in the Rainbow	Adam Quigg	Miniseries, 4 episodes	
1974	Behind the Legend	Frank Gardiner	Miniseries, 1 episode	
1974	Silent Number	Dr. Fisher	1 episode	
1975	Ben Hall	Jack Taylor / Jack Duncan	9 episodes	
1975	Wollongong the Brave		1 episode	
1976	The Emigrants	Migrant reception officer	Miniseries, 1 episode	
1976	Number 96	Frank Hobson	12 episodes	
1976	The Outsiders	Li Norton	1 episode	
1977	Moynihan		1 episode	
1977	Born to Run (aka Harness Fever)	Sergeant Meeker	TV movie	
1977	Young Ramsay	Ken Murray	1 episode	
1977	The Sullivans	Paul Hayward	74 episodes	
1977	Roses Bloom Twice		TV movie	
1977–1979	Glenview High	Kazim Bayezid	2 episodes	
1978	Plunge Into Darkness	Stewart	TV movie	
1978–1980	Cop Shop	Phillip Cooper, Richard Sadler, Sharkey	5 episodes	
1979	Skyways	Hal Bailey	1 episode	
1980	People Like Us	Detective Rogers	TV movie	
1984	Carson's Law	David Mockridge	1 episode	
1985	Special Squad	Haskell	1 episode	
1988	Rafferty's Rules	Robson	1 episode	

==== Theatre ====
Year	Title	Role	Type	Ref.
1953	Dragon's Mouth		Independent Theatre Clubroom (Sydney) (Theatre spoken word)	
1953	The Eagle with Two Heads	Actor	Everyman Theatre, Cheltenham	
1957	Macbeth	Soldiers / Servants	Independent Theatre, Sydney	
1957	The Lark (L'Alouette))	Captain Le Hire	Independent Theatre, Sydney	
1960	Filumena Marturano (also "The Best House in Naples")	Michele	Belgrade Theatre, Coventry	
1961	Mr. Bolfrey	Cohen	Century Theatre Company Leicester, Leicestershire (toured)	
1961	Winter's Journey (originally known internationally as "The Country Girl"		Belgrade Theatre, Coventry, UK	
1963	Three Sisters	Soliony	Belgrade Theatre Company	
1964	King Henry V	Montjoy	Tent Theatre, Adelaide, Tent Theatre, Sydney	
1965	Who's Afraid of Virginia Woolf?		Hunter Theatre, Sydney, Canberra Theatre, UNSW Old Tote Theatre, Sydney & regional tour	
1966	Three Sisters (Tri-sestry)	Soliony	UNSW Old Tote Theatre, Sydney	

=== As director ===
==== Television ====
Year	Title	Role	Type	Ref.
1972	The Spoiler	Director	Episode: "The Price"	
1972	The Godfathers	Director	5 episodes: "There's a Tortoise in My Bath", "The Lift", "Too Many Cakes", "The Prize", "Double Trouble"	
1974	Our Man in the Company	Director	Episode: "Two in One"	
1974	Our Man in the Company	Producer	5 episodes	
1974	Scattergood: Friend of All	Director	TV series	
1977	Cop Shop	Director	6 episodes	
1979	Skyways	Director	TV series	
1982	A Country Practice	Director	14 episodes	
1983	Waterloo Station	Director	1 episode	
1986	Prisoner	Director	7 episodes	
1982–1987	Sons and Daughters	Director	88 episodes	
1989	Richmond Hill	Director	TV series	
1989–1990	Rafferty's Rules	Director	4 episodes: "Out of Line", "One for Us", "Free of Passion", "In Custody"	
1989–1990	E Street	Director	6 episodes	
1991	Neighbours	Director	6 episodes	
1991	The Time Game	Director	TV movie	
1993	You and Me and Uncle Bob	Director	TV movie	
1994	Blue Heelers	Director	4 episodes: "Waiting for Apples", "Family Lies", "Good Cop, Bad Cop", "Crazy Like a Fox"	
