= A Nice Day at the Office =

Australian comedy television series

A Nice Day at the Office is an Australian comedy series which screened on the ABC in 1972. This series was originally one episode of the anthology series The Comedy Game which screened in 1971. It was intended that some of the episodes could act as pilots for the series. The other successful episodes which led to the series were Our Man In Canberra, Scattergood: Friend of All and Aunty Jack. The lead role of Sean Crisp was played by John Bell in the pilot, but when he was unavailable for the series, Rod McLennan took over. Also, Neal Fitzpatrick who played Ted Harvey had limited availability, so the planned 13 episodes were cut back to seven.

== Synopsis ==
A Nice Day at the Office satirised the public service with the two central characters, Ted Harvey and Sean Crisp, working in the Central Files office of a government department.

Harvey is a career public servant who follows every rule in the book, while Crisp is impetuous and irreverent. Their differing personalities lead to clashes and petty ways of annoying each other.

== Cast ==
- Rod McLennan as Sean Crisp
- Neil Fitzpatrick as Ted Harvey
- Gordon McDougall as Claude Fogarty
- Fay Kelton as Vicki Short
- Maggie Dence as Mrs. Quiggley
- Barbara Stephens as Juliet Minnott

== See also ==
- List of Australian television series
