= Scattergood: Friend of All =

Television series

- Genre: Comedy
- Written by: Maurice Murphy
- Directed by: Ted Robinson; Alister Smart
- Starring: Max Cullen
- Country of origin: Australia
- Original language: English
- No. of seasons: 1
- No. of episodes: 6

Production
- Running time: 30 minutes

Original release
- Network: ABC-TV
- Release: 5 January 1975 – 1975

Scattergood: Friend of All is an Australian television sitcom which first screened on the ABC in 1975.

Scattergood: Friend of All was originally one episode of the anthology series The Comedy Game which screened in 1971. It was intended that some of the episodes could act as pilots for series. The other successful episodes which led to series were A Nice Day at the Office, Our Man in Canberra and Aunty Jack.

== Cast ==
- Max Cullen as Claude Scattergood
- Redmond Phillips
- Reg Evans
- Lex Mitchell
- Denny Lawrence
- Lex Marinos
- Dennis Miller
- Moya O'Sullivan
- Alfred Sandor
- Judy Lynne
- Benita Collings
- Dennis Miller

== Broadcast ==
The series was broadcast on ABC-TV from 5 January 1975 at 7:30 pm.

== See also ==
- List of Australian television series
