= The Right Thing (film) =

- Genre: comedy
- Written by: Raymond Bowers
- Directed by: Raymond Menmuir
- Country of origin: Australia
- Original language: English

Production
- Running time: 80 minutes
- Production company: ABC

Original release
- Network: ABC
- Release: 2 October 1963 (Sydney)
- Release: 9 October 1963 (Melbourne)

The Right Thing is a 1963 comedy Australian television play, that was produced by the Australian Broadcasting Corporation Australian TV drama was relatively rare at the time.

== Plot ==
The adventures of a Sydney family. Clarrie and Vera Hamlin are holding an engagement party for their eldest daughter Elena when a handsome young Spanish man, J.G., comes into an encounter with them.

== Cast ==
- Lola Brooks as Elena
- Brigid Lenihan as Vera Hamlin
- Alister Smart as JG
- Grant Taylor as Clarrie Hamlin
- David Yorston
- Noeline Brown as Shirley
- Benita Collings as Jean

== Production ==
The play was written by Raymond Bowers, an Australian living in London. It was mapped out at a lunch early in 1963 between Bowers and director Ray Menmuir in London and was commissioned by Associated Rediffusion. It was directed by Memnuir who had recently returned to Australia after several years in London. It was hoped the play would be the first in a number of co productions between England and Australia.

Scenes were shot in a house on Sydney's North Shore, the Cahill Expressway, the Sydney beach of Longreef, and the Harbour Bridge. It was telerecorded and later shown in London by Associated-Rediffusion. It was the first of a series of exchange programs between the ABC and the British television company.

Alister Smart had also recently returned to England.

== Reception ==
American producer and screenwriter Rod Serling saw the play and disliked the script but praised the acting.

The TV critic from the Sydney Morning Herald said "there was polish in the filming and the script" of The Right Thing but "the fun is wearing a little thin... The insistence on heavily accented Australiana may be more acceptable to overseas audiences than home viewers but the comedy was very well handled."

The Sunday edition of the Sydney Morning Herald called it "one of the biggest turkeys the ABC has given us this season... a dreary and slow moving 90 minutes... almost redeemed by the first class acting of its stars."

The Bulletin wrote that in the play "Australians are pre-1939 characters who drive 1963 cars and live in contemporary homes. The males are Flintstones; publicans and beach boys in conflict with a kind of supple European valor which baffles them, though the girls understand it well enough.... All of the players acted splendidly to the script, and with an English television showing lined up, Raymond Menmuir and his crew were able to step beyond the usual confines and do a fine indoors-outdoors production."

== See also ==
- List of television plays broadcast on Australian Broadcasting Corporation (1960s)
