= Jean Bedford =

Australian writer (1946–2025)

- Born: 4 February 1946; Cambridge, England
- Died: 11 December 2025 (aged 79)
- Occupations: Novelist, short story writer, essayist
- Writing career
- Genre: Crime fiction

Jean Bedford (4 February 1946 – 11 December 2025) was an Australian writer who was best known for her crime fiction. She wrote novels and short stories as well as nonfiction. Bedford was also an editor and journalist and taught creative writing at several universities for over 20 years.

== Background and early career ==
Bedford was born in Cambridge, England, and came to Australia as an infant. She grew up in Victoria on the Mornington Peninsula. She undertook her Bachelor of Arts degree at Monash University and then studied Teaching English as a Second Language at the University of Papua New Guinea where she had gone with her first husband, Klim Gollan. They had a daughter, Sofya Gollan, who is a deaf actress.

After the end of her first marriage, she returned to Australia and worked at the Canberra College of Advanced Education. She later met the writer Peter Corris, with whom she had two more daughters, Miriam and Ruth. After they separated, she married Rod Parker who had a daughter, Abi, from a previous relationship. Parker died in 1988. She then reignited her relationship with Peter Corris and they married in 1991.

Bedford and Corris lived in the Illawarra region on the south coast of New South Wales. She included Australian writers Gabrielle Lord and Helen Garner among her friends.

She had a varied career. In addition to writing, she worked as a teacher, journalist, editor and publisher, and lectured in creative writing at several universities. Her literary career included being literary editor for The National Times and a literary consultant for the Australian Film Commission. In 2012, she and Linda Funnell established the Newtown Review of Books, an independent website for book reviews.

== Writing career ==
Bedford said that she first started to think of writing seriously when she worked at the Canberra College of Advanced Education. Her first writings, short stories, were published in the Nation Review. Her first book was Country Girl Again, published by Sisters in 1979.

Her first novel, Sister Kate, explores the Ned Kelly legend from the point of view of Kelly's sister, Kate. Bedford said she was inspired to write it after reading the American novel Desperadoes which she felt dealt with national myth in a way that Australian writers did not. The book was well-received and regularly appears on school syllabi in Australia. By the time it was published she was at Stanford University on an Australian Stanford Writers Fellowship.

Her second novel, Love Child, published in 1986, explores, she said, "the difference between a romantic passion and real love that has to involve real generosity and a real understanding of what the other person is, and what they want".

Bedford included Patrick White and D. H. Lawrence as her early literary influences and also admired Frank Moorhouse.

She published ten books of fiction, including three detective novels and a thriller. She also edited several collections of fiction and non-fiction. Her short stories appeared in many literary magazines and anthologies.

Bedford judged many awards, including The Australian/Vogel Literary Award.

== Themes and subject matter ==
In an interview with Jennifer Ellison, Bedford said that "You want to do more than just tell a story. You want to tell the truth, and the way you see the truth is very political, always. I hope that my politics come out in what I choose to write about." Bedford's truth often related to the lives of women, and the ways in which they can be trapped. She was part of a new wave of contemporary women writers in the 1980s who, with the support of both independent and mainstream publishing houses like McPhee Gribble and Penguin Books, "experimented with narrative form to find ways to tell women's stories".

Her collection of short stories, Country Girl, Again, "paints a bleak, unillusioned picture of rural life and its stifling or destructive effects on the lives of women". Similarly, Colouring In, a collaborative work, also explores women's lives, this time looking at "the pleasures and pressures of urban life".

Bedford's crime and historical novels also focus on women and their experience. Sister Kate, her novel imagining the life of Ned Kelly' sister, provides a feminist perspective on a legend which until then had been almost totally expressed in terms of male mythology, and If With a Beating Heart is about "the turbulent life" of Claire Claremont, who was the stepsister oo Mary Shelley and the lover of Lord Byron.

== Death ==
Bedford died on 11 December 2025 at the age of 79.

== Works ==
- Country Girl Again (1979, collection of short stories)
- Sister Kate (1982)
- Love Child (1986)
- Colouring In (1986, collection of short stories with Rosemary Cresswell)
- To Make a Killing (1990, Anna Southwood Mystery series)
- Worse than Death (1992, Anna Southwood Mystery series, with Tom Kelly)
- Signs of Murder (1993, Anna Southwood Mystery series)
- If with a Beating Heart (1993)
- Moonlight Becomes You (1996)
- Crime and Tide (1998, Brisbane River Mysteries)
