= Benita Collings =

Australian actress and television presenter

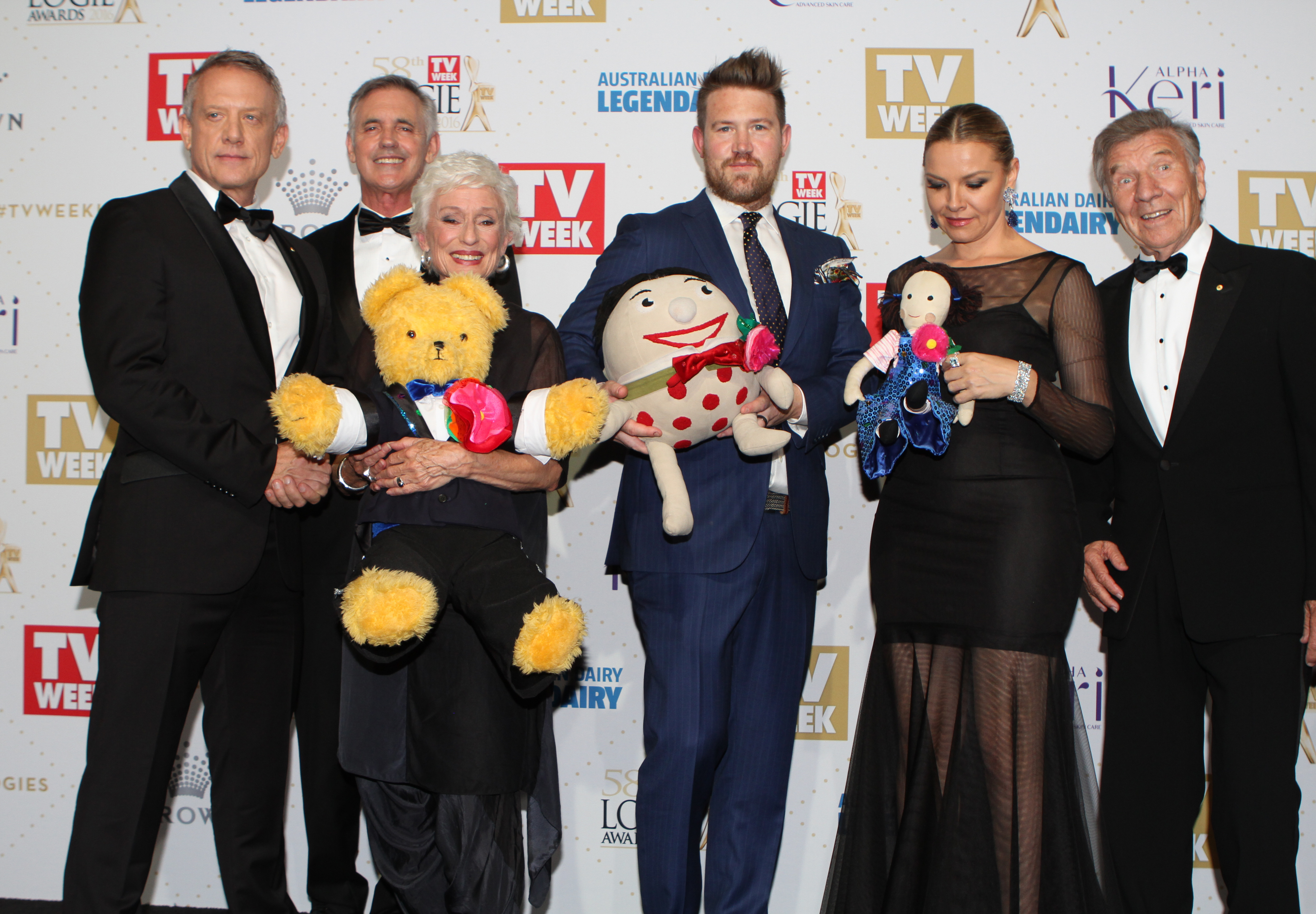
- Play School Cast 2016 TV Week Logie Awards, Collings (third from left) holding Big Ted with co-presenters Simon Burke, Andrew McFarlane, Eddie Perfect, Justine Clarke and Don Spencer.
- Born: 1940 (age 85–86); Australia
- Occupations: Actress; Television presenter; Voice actor; Singer; Sound designer; Stage Manager
- Years active: 1961–present
- Known for: Presenter on Play School (1969–1999), character actress

Benita Collings (born 1940) is an Australian theatre, television and film character actress and children's television presenter best known for her role on ABC TV's Play School. Collings has also featured in documentaries and commercials.

== Early life ==
Collings was born in 1940 and started her training at the Independent Theatre under Dame Doris Fitton in 1955 and also trained in ballet and jazz, under Ronne Arnold.

== Theatre, television and Film ==
Collings started her professional career By 1961, having joined the Ensemble Theatre under producer and director Hayes Gordon, appearing in numerous plays including a production of Neil Simons, Last of the Red Hot Lovers, directed by Jon Ewing, Absurd Person Singular and Doctor in the House.

Collings is best known for her long-running stint as a presenter for Play School on the Australian Broadcasting Corporation (ABC) from 1969 until 1999. She was one of the longest-serving presenters after a 30-year tenure, and although is credited with appearing in the most episodes, her tenure on the show was surpassed by Don Spencer, who presented from 1968 until 1999

Collings described her first audition for Play School as awful because she didn't learn her script ahead of time. Two years later, Collings was invited back for a second audition based on her storytelling skills alone and got the part that invited her into the living rooms of thousands of Australian children in 401 episodes.

Her time on Play School saw her educating children by singing songs, making crafts, discussing days of the week, reading stories and famously playing with such toys as Big Ted, Humpty and Jemima. Being an introvert, Collings took some time to accept the fame that Play School gave her, as she learned to accept compliments from strangers in the street. On working with her occasional on-screen companion, John Hamblin, Collings stated: "He was delicious to work with – wicked and such fun". Big Ted is Collings' favourite Play School toy character. Bloopers of Collings' time on the show have also resurfaced, mostly featuring her swearily forgetting lines or acting as foil to Hamblin's crude jokes.

In addition to her position as an Australian children's television presenter, Collings has been a screen performer, appearing in many of Australian television dramas, including Homicide, Division 4, Matlock Police, The Restless Years, The Sullivans, The Young Doctors, Sons and Daughters, Rafferty's Rules and A Country Practice amongst others.

Collings appeared in the feature film Knowing as the mother of Nicolas Cage's character.

In 2019, Collings took part in a comedy revue about older people and the young people they deal with called Senior Moments, alongside John Wood and Geoff Harvey.

Collings has expressed her concern with modern children being glued to technology rather than forming a connection with humans.

== Filmography ==
=== Film ===
Year	Title	Role	Type
1972	Sunstruck	Alice	Feature film
2005	A Black and White World	Florist	Film short
2009	Knowing	John's Mother	Feature film
2010	The Tree	Aunt Mary	Feature film
2011	Sleeping Beauty	Dinner Guest	Feature film
2011	The Eye of the Storm	Lady at lunch	Feature film
2013	The Egg	Narrator	Film short
2019	Barking Mad	Muriel	Film short
2021	The Pitch	Celia Montgomery	Feature film
2021	Strung	Beatrice	Feature film
2026	The Better Man	Celia Montgomery	Feature Film

=== Television ===
Year	Title	Role	Type
1963	The Right Thing	Jean	TV movie
1966	The Private World of Miss Prim	Typist	TV series, 11 episodes
1968	Contrabandits	Air Hostess	TV series, 1 episode
1969–1999	Play School	Presenter	TV series
1970	The Rovers	Margaret Walsh	TV series
1971	The Comedy Game	Turner	TV series, 1 episode
1972	The Godfathers	Miss Lark	TV series, 1 episode
1972	Spyforce	Sister Hilda	TV series, 2 episodes
1970–1973	Homicide	Joan Greaves / Freda Clarke / Catherine Davies	TV series, 3 episodes
1970–1973	Division 4	Nina Radcliffe / Louise Jenkins / Barbara Young	TV series, 3 episodes
1974	Silent Number	Mary	TV series, 1 episode
1973–1974	Our Man in the Company	Turner	TV series, 15 episodes
1974	Matlock Police	Betty Holmes / Susan Middleton	TV series, 2 episodes
1975	Scattergood: Friend of All		TV series, 1 episode
1975	Quality of Mercy		TV series, episode 7. "Twice Blessed"
1977	The Sullivans	Lucette	TV series
1977–1982	The Restless Years	Clare Moran	TV series, 677 episodes
1982	Secret Valley		TV series, 3 episodes
1982; 1984	A Country Practice	Jill Stevens / Natalie Baker	TV series, 2 episodes
1983	Return to Eden	Estelle Rutherford	TV miniseries, 1 episode
1984	Kindred Spirits	Tarot Reader	TV movie
1984–1987	The New Adventures of Blinky Bill	Host	TV series
1985	Epic (Australian version)	The Narrator	Animated TV movie
1987	Sons and Daughters	June Halliday	TV series, 2 episodes
1987	Rafferty's Rules	Magda	TV series, 1 episode
1987	Danger Down Under (aka Reed Down Under)	Dr Eileen Townsend	TV movie
1987	Computer Ghosts	Eva	TV movie
1991	Play School's 25th Anniversary	Herself	TV special
1996	Play School 30th Anniversary	Herself	TV special
1996	The Glynn Nicholas Show	Gremlins	TV series, 1 episode
2001	Pizza	Wowser lady	TV series, 1 episode
2006	50 Years Of ABC Television	Herself	TV special
2016	Big Ted's Excellent Adventure: 50 Years of Play School	Herself	TV special
2016	Janet King	Robin King	TV series, 4 episodes
2018	Resting Pitch Face	Olivia's Mum	TV series, 1 episode

=== Other appearances ===
Year	Title	Role	Notes
1998	Burke's Backyard	Celebrity gardener	1 episode
2016	Have You Been Paying Attention?	Guest Quiz Master	
2022	Australia's Got Talent	Guest (with Chris O'Brien Lifehouse Choir)	1 episode
