= You and Me and Uncle Bob =

- DVD cover
- Written by: Rob George
- Directed by: Alister Smart
- Starring: Melissa Jaffer; Brooke Anderson; David Kaff; Martin Vaughan
- Country of origin: Australia
- Original language: English

Production
- Producers: Robert Bruning; Adrienne Read
- Running time: 91 minutes
- Production company: Robert Bruning Productions

Original release
- Release: 1993

You and Me and Uncle Bob, or You, Me and Uncle Bob, is a 1993 Australian television film directed by Alister Smart. The screenplay concerns two children (portrayed by Brooke Anderson and David Kaff) who play cupid to an unlikely older couple: a chorus girl (portrayed by Melissa Jaffer) and an unemployed butcher (portrayed by Martin Vaughan).

== Cast ==
- Brooke Anderson as Charlie
- David Kaff as Ben
- Melissa Jaffer as Sylvie
- Martin Vaughan as Uncle Bob
- Joanne Samuel as Rosie
- Sarah Chadwick as Tess
- Lynn Rainbow as Miss Gibbs
- Noel Hodda as Neville
- Joy Hruby as Mrs Patterson
- Shane McNamara as Pound manager

== Home media ==
A DVD transfer of the film was released as You, Me and Uncle Bob in Australia by Flashback Entertainment, Cat no. 20420.
