= Jackaroo (miniseries) =

- Written by: John Cundill
- Directed by: Michael Carson
- Starring: Annie Jones; David McCubbin; Tina Bursill; Warren Mitchell
- Country of origin: Australia
- Original language: English
- No. of episodes: 2 x 2 hours

Production
- Producer: Bill Hughes
- Budget: $4.5 million

Original release
- Network: Seven Network
- Release: 7 October – 8 October 1990

Jackaroo is a 1990 Australian mini series about a half-caste who goes to work on a West Australian property and falls in love with a girl.

David McCubbinwas not Aboriginal. Producer Bill Hughes said they could not find an Aboriginal actor of the right age.

== Cast ==
- Annie Jones - Clare Mallory
- David McCubbin - Jack Simmons
- Tina Bursill - Martha Logan
- Warren Mitchell - Ambrose Barbitron
- Peter Hardy - Ram Gallagher
- Colin McEwan - Roy Mallory

== DVD release ==
It has been announced by Crawford Productions that this mini series will be released on DVD in 2025.
