= Australia for Kids =

Studio album by Don Spencer
- Released: August 1989
- Label: ABC Kids
- Producer: Allen Caswell, Don Spencer

Australia For Kids is a 1989 album by Don Spencer. This album was nominated for the ARIA Award for Best Children's Album in 1990.

== Track listing ==
- All songs written and arranged by Don Spencer and Alan Caswell.
1. "Bob The Kelpie" - 2:36
2. "Rain" - 3:00
3. "Out The Back" - 2:49
4. "Boomerang" - 2:48
5. "Australia" - 2:44
6. "She'll Be Right" - 3:45
7. "ABC Of Australia" - 2:23
8. "Didgeridoo" - 2:59
9. "Captain Cook" - 3:05
10. "Sunshine" - 2:15
11. "Coo-oo-ee" - 3:20
12. "Aussie Boys And Aussie Girls" - 2:30

== Personnel ==
- Allan Caswell - vocals
- Mark Collins - banjo
- Wayne Goodwin - fiddle, mandolin
- Tony Hicks - drums
- Marty Hill - tenor sax
- Karen Johns - vocals
- Bob Johnson - trombone
- Dave Kimber - piano
- Terry Murray - guitar
- Bill O'Toole - click sticks, didgeridoo, Irish whistle
- Phil Scorgie - bass
- Danielle Spencer - vocals
- Don Spencer - vocals, guitar

== Charts ==
Weekly chart performance for Australia for Kids
Chart (1989)	Peak position
Australian Albums (ARIA)	77

== Certifications ==
Region	Certification	Certified units/sales
Australia (ARIA)	Gold	35,000^{^}
^{^} Shipments figures based on certification alone.
