= Play School (Australian TV series) =

Australian TV series

- Title card from 2011 to 2026
- Genre: Children's television
- Created by: Joy Whitby
- Presented by: See Presenters
- Theme music composer: Richard Connolly (lyrics by Rosemary Milne)
- Opening theme: "There's a Bear in There"
- Ending theme: "There's a Bear in There" (instrumental)
- Country of origin: Australia
- Original language: English
- No. of seasons: 61
- No. of episodes: 2,670 episodes as at November 2025 (approx.) (list of episodes)

Production
- Executive producers: Various: Allan Kendall (1966–1980); Henrietta Clark (1980–1984, 1990–1999); Claire Henderson (1984–1988); John Fox (1988–1990); Virginia Lumsden (1999–2009); Jan Stradling (2009–2021); Lyndal Mebberson (2023–2026)
- Producers: Various: Allan Kendall (1966–1980); Henrietta Clark (1980–1984, 1990–1999); Claire Henderson (1984–1988); Natasha Pizzica (2022); Bryson Hall (2024–2026)
- Production location: Australian Broadcasting Corporation Studios
- Running time: 25–30 minutes
- Production company: Australian Broadcasting Corporation

Original release
- Network: ABC Television
- Release: 18 July 1966 – present

Play School is an Australian children's television series produced by the Australian Broadcasting Corporation. The series is educational television aimed at preschool children, based on the original British version created by Joy Whitby, which ran from 1964 to 1988. The program features presenters who educate and entertain the child audience through stories, songs and movement. Play School premiered on 18 July 1966 on ABC Television.

The first episode was presented by Diane Dorgan and Alister Smart in 1966. Since then, the longest-running hosts have included Benita Collings (1969–1999) and John Hamblin (1970–1999). The series currently stars a rotating roster of hosts including Justine Clarke and Leah Vandenberg, who have both presented the series since 2000, as well as Teo Gebert, Alex Papps, and others. Stuffed toys, including Big Ted, Little Ted, Jemima, Humpty and Kiya, are featured in the program and utilised by the presenters.

Play School has influenced the development of merchandise, albums, and concert tours. The series won an ARIA Award in 1997 for Best Children's Album, and an AACTA Award in 2026 for Best Children's Program. The series was awarded Most Outstanding Achievement in Children's Television at the 1998 Logie Awards, was inducted into the Logie Hall of Fame in 2006, and won Best Children's Program in 2026. It is the longest-running children's show in Australia and the second-longest-running children's show worldwide.

== History ==
=== 1966–1999: Origins and early years ===
Play School premiered on 18 July 1966 at 10.05am in NSW and Victoria only, but soon was broadcast around the country. The first episode was originally transmitted live and the original executive producer was Allan Kendall and the first presenters on air were Diane Dorgan and Alister Smart. In December that same year, Play School began afternoon transmissions as well as mornings, a practice that continues to this day. For the first decade, Play School was broadcast in black and white with the first colour episode broadcasting on June 28, 1976.

=== 2000–2009: Series revamp and 40th anniversary ===
Five new presenters were hired for Play School in September 1999; Justine Clarke, Jay Laga'aia, Andrew McFarlane, Rhys Muldoon and Leah Vandenberg. It was reported that the series would be undergoing an overhaul, with a new set and new opening titles debuting in the following year. It was later reported in February 2000 that the ABC were intending to modernise the program, by replacing its senior presenters with younger actors. It was suggested in report that the producers had been influenced by the success of the children's series Hi-5, which premiered in 1999. The series would now be filmed in pre-recorded segments, rather than in one continuous half-hour sequence. Additional changes included the removal of three senior presenters of Play School: Benita Collings, Angela Moore and David James. Henrietta Clark was also dismissed as the executive producer of the program, after serving in this role for the previous ten years. The overhaul of the series was criticised, in particular the removal of Collings after her tenure of thirty years as a presenter. ABC executive Claire Henderson responded to the criticism by explaining that the changes to the program were "minimal". The new episodes were expected to begin broadcasting in May.

In 2006, after four decades since the first episode was recorded, 1,781 episodes of Play School had been made and over one million children were viewing the show each week. To commemorate the birthday, there was a free Play School concert on Thursday Island in the Torres Strait.

Play School was admitted to the Logie Hall of Fame in 2006, the program's 40th anniversary year. It is one of only five Australian television programs to be inducted. Play School was the third show to enter the Logies' Hall of Fame in its own right, after Four Corners (1992) and Neighbours (2005). It was also the first children's show inducted into the hall of fame. During the Logie Awards of 2006, a package showing memorable scenes from the show throughout its history was shown, before notable presenters (from past and present) came onto the stage with some of the favourite toys from the show. After these presenters accepted the award, the audience then joined them for a stirring rendition of the Play School theme.

=== 2009–2019: Channel move, Big Adventure spin-off series and 50th anniversary ===
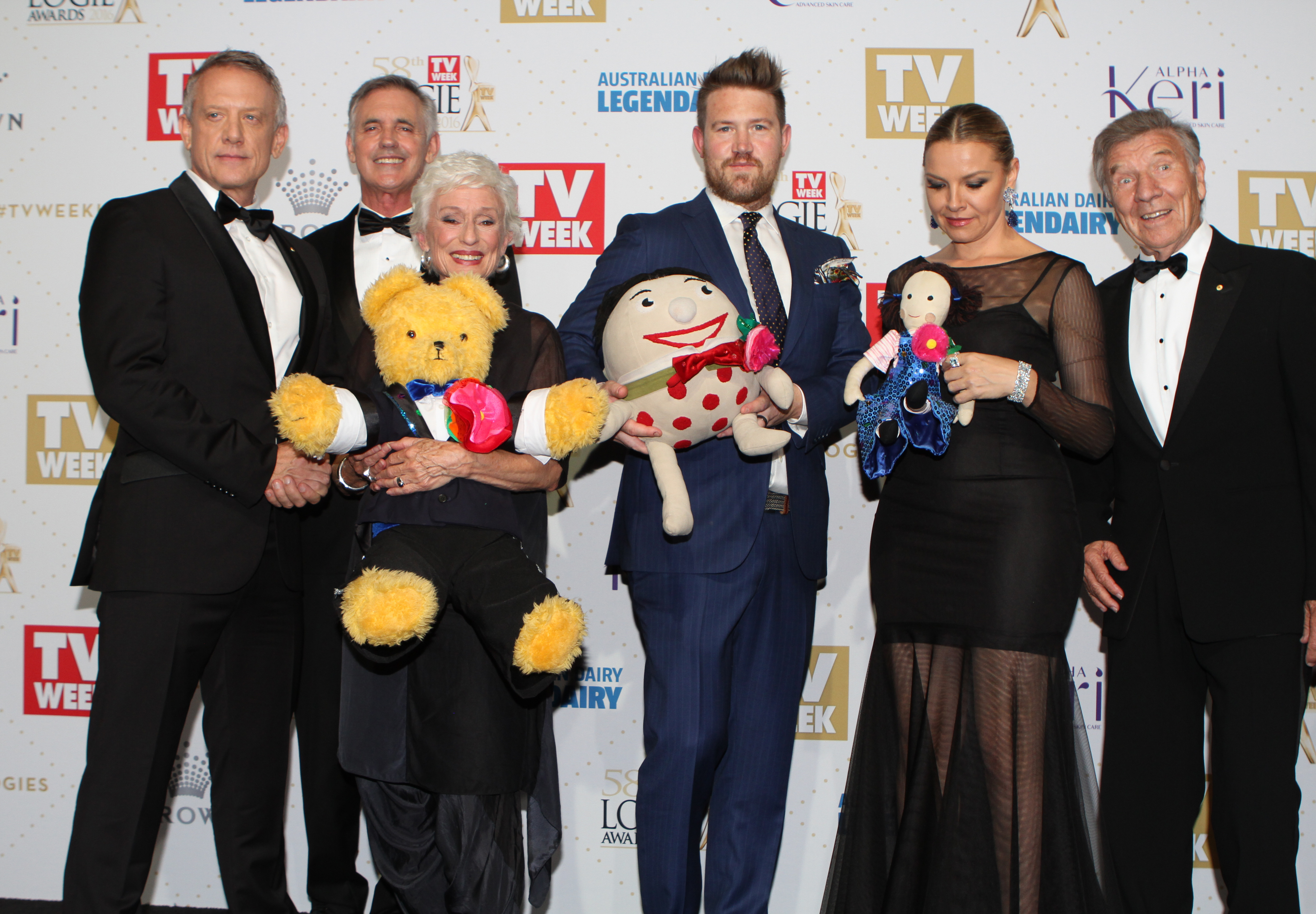
Play School presenters celebrating the program's 50th anniversary at the Logie Awards of 2016. From left to right: Simon Burke, Andrew McFarlane, Benita Collings, Eddie Perfect, Justine Clarke and Don Spencer.

In July 2009, Jan Stradling was appointed as the executive producer for children's production at the ABC, and became the executive producer for Play School. Stradling led the development of the Big Adventure spin-off series, beginning with Little Ted's Big Adventure, where the toy was filmed having adventures outside the studio. She stated that the Little Ted toy was one of the first toys to be filmed outside; previously, the toys did not leave the studio.

On Monday 4 July 2011, Play School updated its opening titles using a combination of stop motion and computer animation with a new arrangement of the theme song sung by presenters Laga'aia and Clarke.

In 2016, Play School celebrated 50 years on the air and had a month of celebrations. By the time of the anniversary, 2,250 episodes had been made and there were 1,821 songs in the Play School inventory. To mark its 50th anniversary, from 4 July the program presented a series of cover songs called Play School: Celebrity Covers.

=== 2019–present: Specials and 60th anniversary ===
Several special episodes of Play School were produced beginning in 2019, along with new spin-off series and digital content to expand the program's output. An episode titled "Acknowledgement of Country" aired in July 2019 for NAIDOC Week, hosted by Aboriginal presenters Luke Carroll, Miranda Tapsell and Hunter Page-Lochard. The special, written by Page-Lochard, celebrated Indigenous Australians and focused on educating viewers about Australian Aboriginal culture. A new toy, a rag doll named Kiya, was introduced during the program, who was described as originating from Noongar Country. Another special titled "All Together" aired in March 2025, and received an AACTA Award for Best Children's Program in 2026. The episode was written by Vandenberg, who included themes of allyship and friendship in the script.

The 60th anniversary of Play School was commemorated in July 2026 with an episode of Australian Story which featured behind the scenes footage and interviews with presenters Laga'aia, Clarke, Muldoon, Don Spencer, Simon Burke and Miah Madden. A series of regular episodes titled "Party Animals!" aired in July. Vanessa Alford joined the program as the new resident deaf interpreter in August. She replaced long-term presenter Sofya Gollan, who directed a series of episodes featuring picture-in-picture guest appearances by various Auslan translators. In its 60th year, the series won Best Children's Program at the 2026 Logie Awards.

== Presenters ==
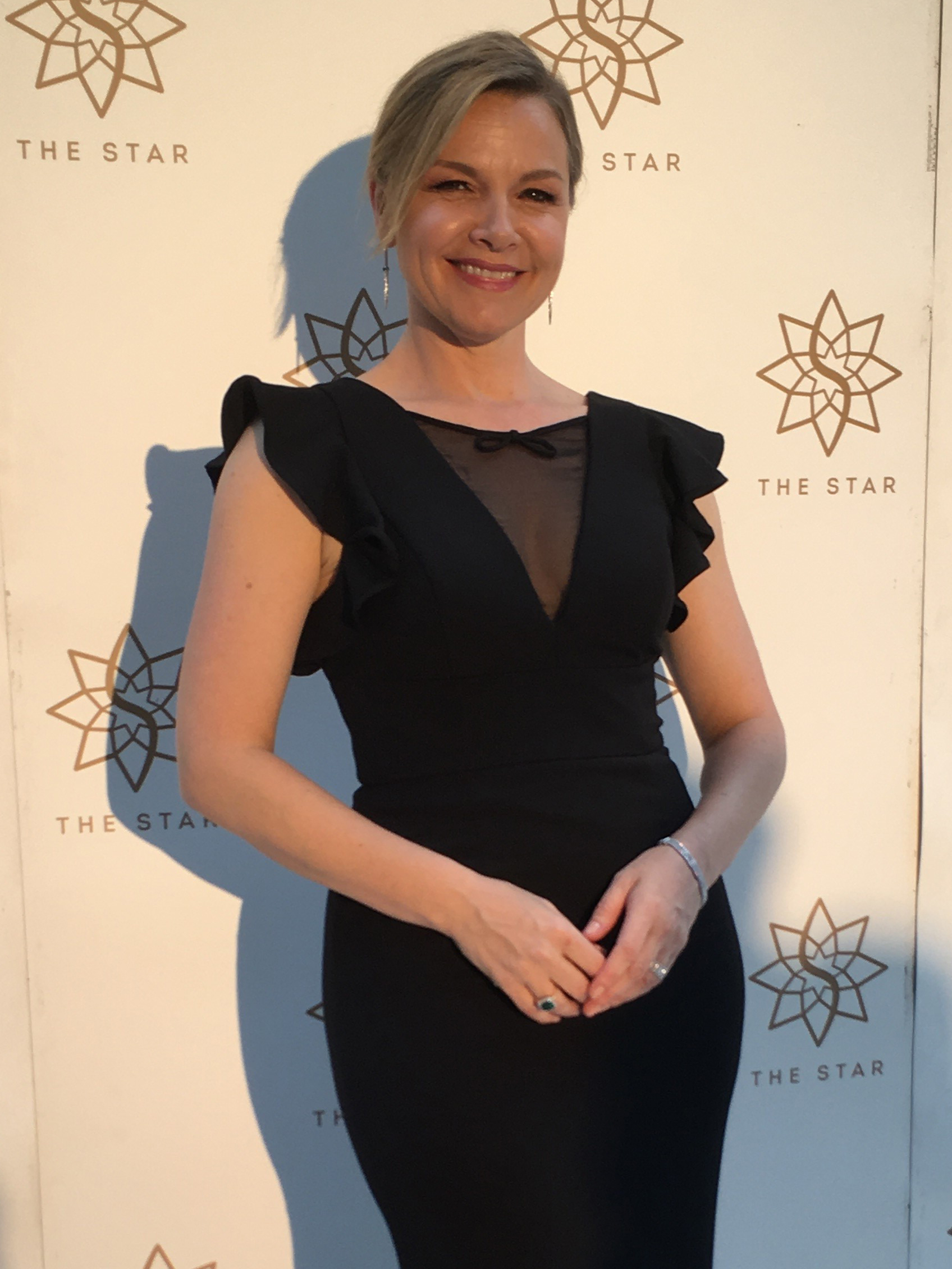
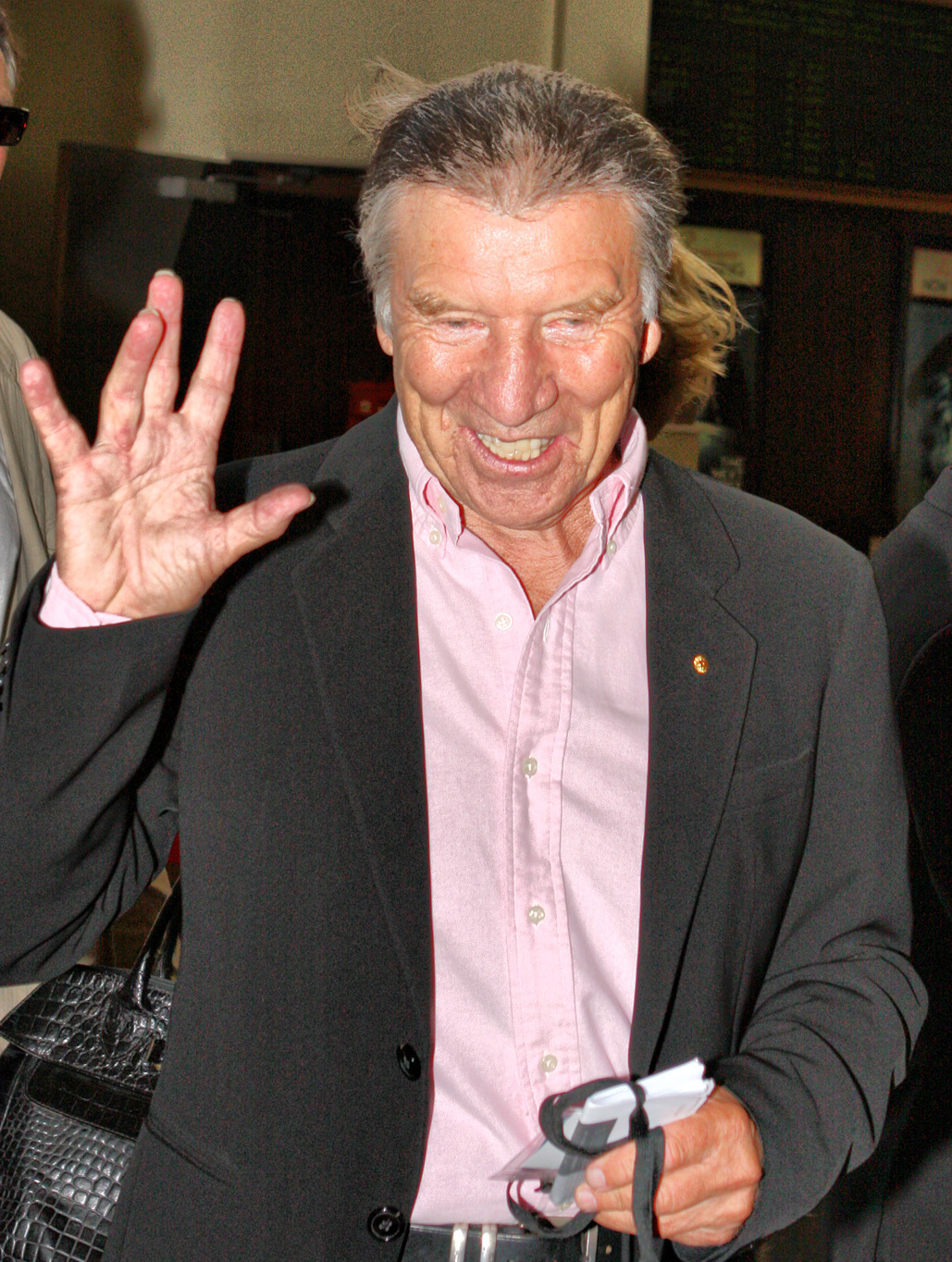
Current presenter Justine Clarke (left, 2018) and former presenter Don Spencer (right, 2011)

The longest-serving presenters of Play School are Benita Collings (30 years and over 400 episodes) and John Hamblin (29 years and over 350 episodes). Other long-term hosts of the program have included Sofya Gollan (28 years), Justine Clarke (over 26 years), Leah Vandenberg (over 26 years), Andrew McFarlane (25 years), Noni Hazlehurst (23 years) and Karen Pang (23 years).

=== Current presenters ===
- Justine Clarke (2000–present)
- Leah Vandenberg (2000–present)
- Teo Gebert (2004–present)
- Alex Papps (2006–present)
- Abi Tucker (2009–present)
- Luke Carroll (2010–present)
- Emma Palmer (2011–present)
- Rachael Coopes (2011–present)
- Michelle Lim Davidson (2013–present)
- Zindzi Okenyo (2013–present)
- Eddie Perfect (2015–2016, 2023–2026)
- Takaya Honda (2015–present)
- Matthew Backer (2017–present)
- Kaeng Chan (2018–present)
- Miah Madden (2022–present)
- Vanessa Alford (2026–present)
- Albert Mwangi (2026–present)

=== Former presenters ===
- Diane Dorgan (1966, original)
- Alister Smart (1966–1991, original)
- Lorraine Bayly (1966–1978)
- Peter Drake (1966)
- Evan Dunstan (1966)
- Anne Haddy (1966–1969)
- Patsy King (1966)
- Donald Macdonald (1966–1969)
- Nehama Patkin (1966)
- David Yorston (1966)
- Kerry Francis (1966–1969)
- Ann Stroh (1966)
- Tom Oliver (1967)
- Richard Bradshaw (1967–1996)
- Darlene Johnson (1968)
- Don Spencer (1968–1992) (Note: Spencer also appeared in a segment in 1999, presented an episode of the Play School: Show Time spin-off series in 2016, and returned as a guest presenter in 2024.)
- Ken Shorter (1969)
- Jan Kingsbury (1969–1986)
- Benita Collings (1969–1999) (Note: Collings returned to present an episode of the Play School: Show Time spin-off series in 2016, and Play School: Story Time in 2019.)
- John Hamblin (1970–1999)
- John Waters (1972–1990) (Note: Also returned as a guest presenter in 2026.)
- Peter Sumner (1974)
- Mary Ann Severne (1975)
- Roslyn Gentle (1977)
- Judy Cannon (1978)
- Noni Hazlehurst (1978–2001)
- Colin Friels (1980)
- Mervyn Drake (1980s)
- Jennifer Ludlam (1983–1986)
- Barbara Frawley (1980–1992)
- Elaine Hudson (1981)
- Lynette Curran (1981)
- Philip Quast (1981–1996)
- Tyler Coppin (1982)
- Liddy Clark (1984)
- Merridy Eastman (1985–1989)
- George Spartels (1986–1999) (Note: Also returned as a guest presenter in 2024.)
- Anna Maria Monticelli (1987)
- Trisha Goddard (1987–1998)
- Liz Burch (1988)
- Simon Burke (1988–2007, 2013) (Note: Burke also returned to present an episode of the Play School: Story Time spin-off series in 2020.)
- James Valentine (1989, 1992)
- Tara Morice (1989, 1993)
- Monica Trapaga (1990–1998) (Note: Trapaga also returned as a guest presenter in 2022 and 2024.)
- Pauline McLeod (1990–2003)
- Sarah Chadwick (1991)
- David McCubbin (1991–1995)
- Carlton Lamb (1992–1993)
- Colin Buchanan (1992–1999)
- Sofya Gollan (1992–2020)
- Jeremy Scrivener (1993–1994)
- Nicholas Opolski (1993–1994)
- Angela Moore (1994–2000)
- David James (1994–2000)
- Georgie Goldstein (1995–1996)
- Joy Hopwood (1995–1997)
- Jamie Oxenbould (1997)
- Glenn Butcher (1997–2000)
- Deborah Mailman (1998–2002)
- Karen Pang (1999–2022)
- Jay Laga'aia (2000–2014)
- Andrew McFarlane (2000–2025)
- Rhys Muldoon (2000–2012)
- Mark Owen-Taylor (2000)
- Dasi Ruz (2000)
- David Whitney (2001)
- Ling-Hsueh Tang (2002)
- Matt Passmore (2002–2011)
- Brooke Satchwell (2006–2009)
- Georgie Parker (2006–2012)
- Hugh Sheridan (2009–2013)
- Essie Davis (2009–2011)
- Jolene Anderson (2010–2011)
- Jonny Pasvolsky (2011–2012)
- Miranda Tapsell (2016–2019)
- Nicholas Brown (2017–2025)
- Hunter Page-Lochard (2018–2025)
- Kiruna Stamell (2018–2020)

== Format ==
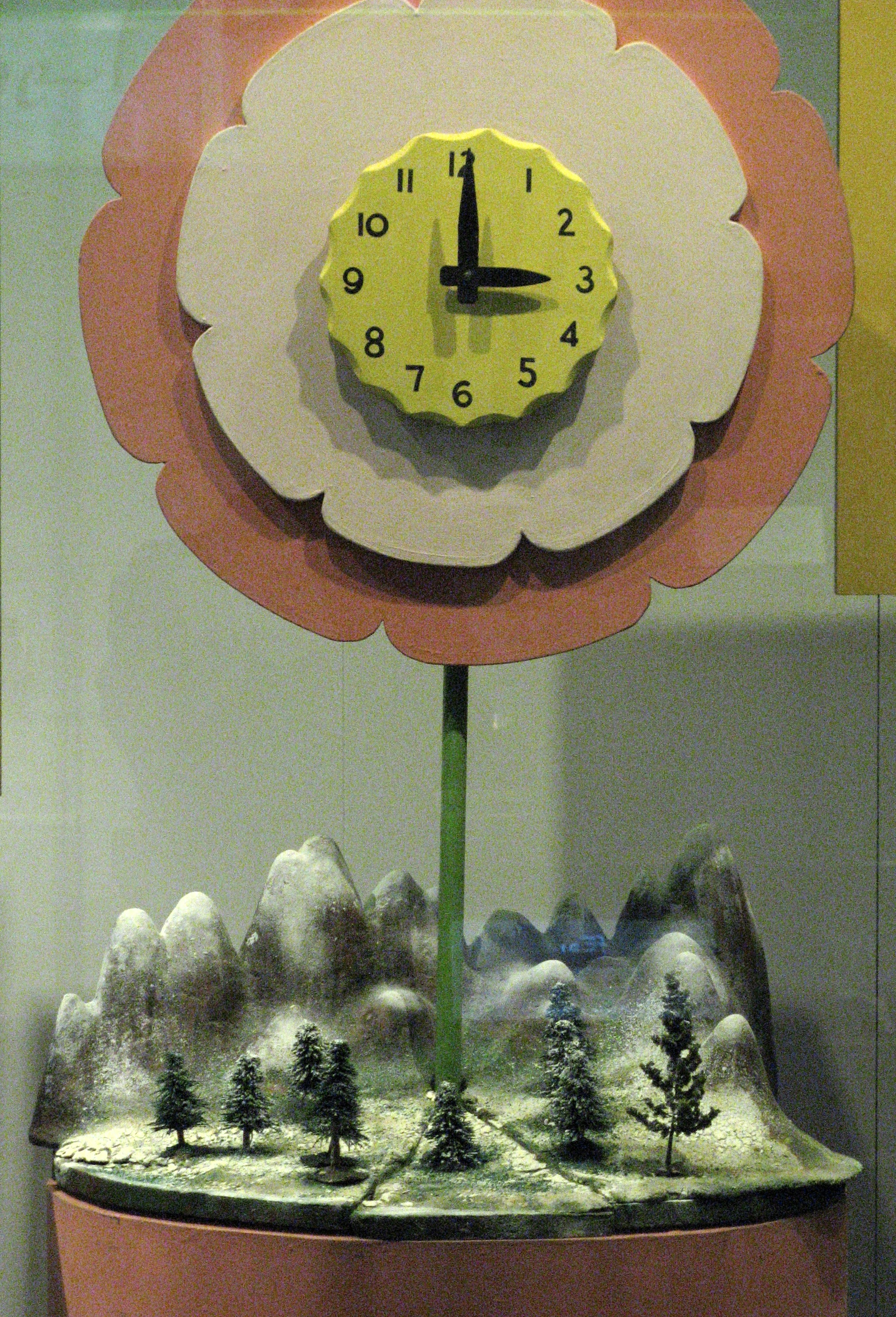
Flower clock

The format of the show is activities, songs and games with either host passing back to each other at the end of their segment, and frequently joining each other in activities. Each day the presenters look at the calendar to find out which day of the week it is, read a story, and look through the windows. From 1976 to 2000, they had a clock shaped like a rocket, and from 1966 to 2000, a clock shaped like a flower. In 2000, the show had a considerable revamp, with the rocket and flower clocks and the three windows sent to the National Museum of Australia.

Every week there is a common theme running through the program that the actors reflect upon during the episode. As funding was limited, only 45 new episodes were made each year, which means that nine weekly blocks shown each year were new episodes, the rest repeats. The Play School team make nine series each year, which includes 45-50 episodes. Each series takes around 17 weeks to make.

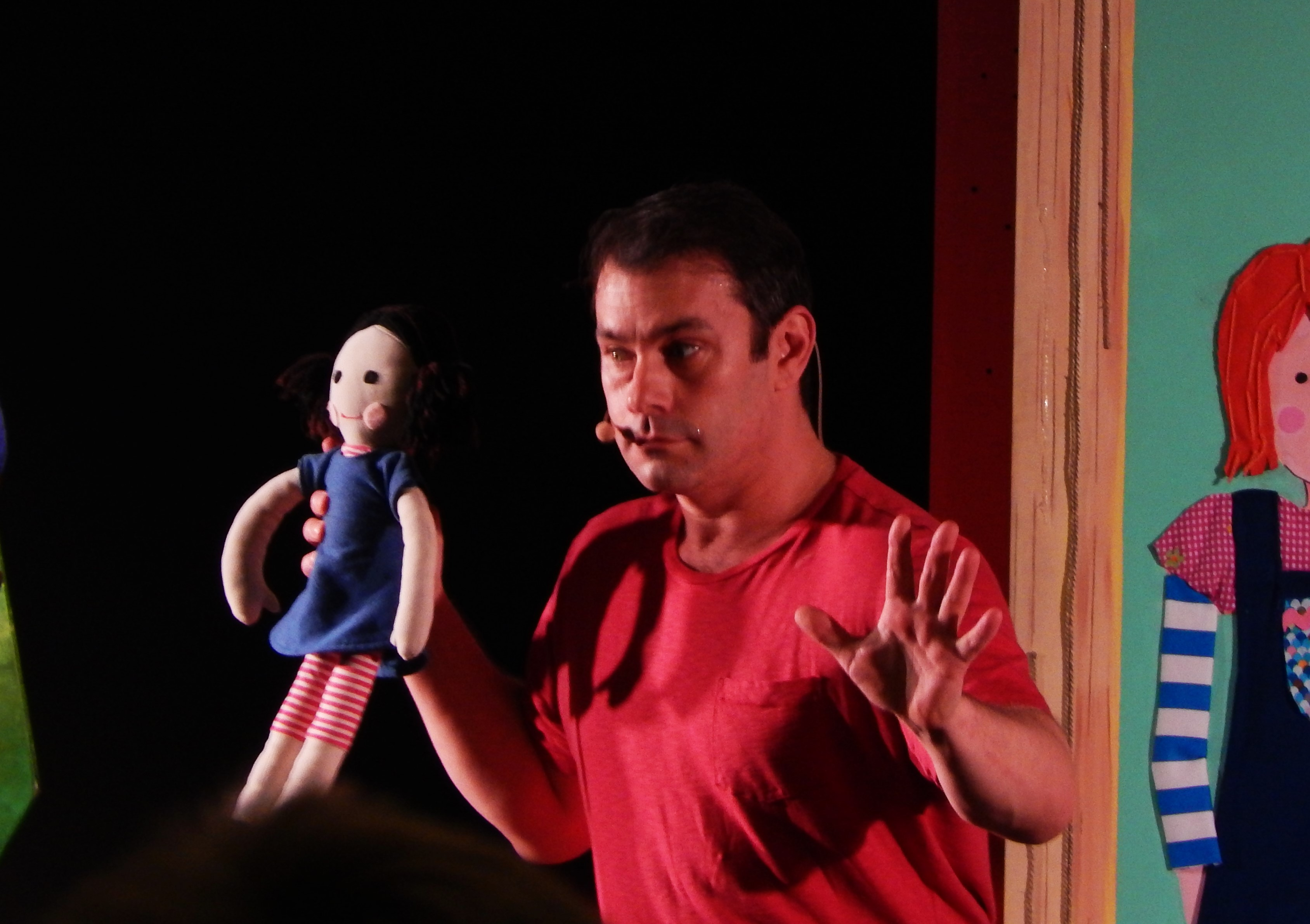
Teo Gebert performing at a Play School concert holding the Jemima doll, 2015

Stuffed toys are an integral part of the Play School brand, with the presenters using the characters in stories and imaginative play. Big Ted is the longest-serving toy, a yellow teddy bear who debuted in the first episode of the series. The other main toys from the program are Little Ted, a brown teddy bear; Jemima, a rag doll with brown wool pigtails; and Humpty, a white egg-shaped toy resembling Humpty Dumpty. Another teddy bear named Maurice was introduced in 1987. New toys from the 1990s included Scrap the Dog, designed by graphic artist Katrina van Gendt; Meeka, a plastic doll of Asian descent named by a competition winner; and Fergus, a toy frog. The series featured an Aboriginal Australian plastic doll named Jim, who was replaced by Dan in the 2000s. A duck named Tippy made its debut in 2010, while Banana, a banana-shaped toy wearing pyjamas, was retired upon the debut of the Bananas in Pyjamas animated series. Twin plastic doll of Korean descent Kim and Lisa were given a makeover in 2011 to highlight their individual personalities. Illustrator Bruce Whatley designed a new toy a kangaroo named Joey, for the 50th anniversary of Play School in 2016. An Aboriginal Australian rag doll from Noongar Country, named Kiya (meaning "hello"), was introduced in 2019.

=== Teachings ===
From the inception of the program, the producers of Play School promoted equality, playful education, and a love of learning to its audience. Working on Play School was considered a demanding and important job for some actors, due to becoming part of a generation of children's lives and providing a foundation for learning things that will last for life.

Play School's stated philosophy is to encourage a child "to wonder, to think, to feel and to imagine". The duo (sometimes a trio when joined a hearing impaired Auslan interpreter) of presenters address the child directly and personally, intending that every child watching the show feels that they are spending time with two people they know and can trust. Into this relationship are woven the stories, songs and activities that form the fabric of Australian children's culture.

== Episodes ==
Series	Episodes	Originally released	
Series	Episodes	First released	Last released
54	20	8 July 2019	18 December 2020
55	20	2 April 2020	27 May 2021
56	20	7 June 2021	1 April 2022
57	20	2 May 2022	24 February 2023
58	25	12 June 2023	30 December 2023
59	25	27 May 2024	19 March 2025
60	30	5 May 2025	8 May 2026
61	TBA	13 July 2026	TBA

== Music ==
=== Pianists ===
Play School has historically had a musical director who doubles as a resident pianist, and plays live music to accompany the presenters in each episode. The pianist performs both prepared songs, as well as underscoring which is improvised. Warren Carr was a long-serving musical director and pianist of the series, who served in this role from 1972 until his death in 1993. Current pianist Peter Dasent joined the program in 2000 when Max Lambert, who held the role from 1991 to 1999, was commissioned to compose music for the 2000 Sydney Olympics. For a time, Dasent shared the job with Brian Castles Onion, a pianist for the Opera Australia company. In 2026, Dasent stated that he was writing more original songs for Play School (roughly two per episode) than he had previously.

=== Theme song ===
There's a bear in there,
and a chair as well.
There are people with games
and stories to tell.
Open wide, come inside;
it's Play School.

— Lyrics for "There's a Bear in There"

The Play School theme song, "There's a Bear in There", was composed by Australian composer Richard Connolly, with lyrics by Rosemary Milne. In 2016, the song was remixed by Andre Butterworth aka Copycatt as the winner of the Triple J Play School remix competition which, along with two other remixes by KLP and Jondrette Den respectively, appeared on the Play School album Famous Friends: Celebrating 50 Years of Play School. In 2017, "There's a Bear in There" was inducted into the National Film and Sound Archive's Sounds of Australia registry.

=== Albums ===
- Hey Diddle Diddle (1976)
- Hickory Dickory (1978)
- Humpty Dumpty (1981)
- Wiggerly Woo (1984)
- There's a Bear in There (1987)
- ...It's Play School (1991)
- The Best of Play School (1993)
- Oomba Baroomba (1994)
- Play School Favourites (1996)
- In The Car (1997)
- Hullabaloo (1999)
- Favourite Play School Nursery Rhymes (2002)
- Hip Hip Hooray (2002)
- Sing-a-Long Songs (2004)
- Let's Play Together (2011)
- Come and Play 45th Anniversary (2011)
- Big Ted, Prince of Bears (2014)
- Favourite Things Songs and Nursery Rhymes from Play School (2014)
- Play School: Jemima's Big Adventure (2015)
- Once Upon a Time (2015)
- Famous Friends: Celebrating 50 Years of Play School (2016)
- Play School: 50 Best Songs (2016)
- Very Jazzy Street Party (2022)
- There's a Rave in There (2026)

== Awards and nominations ==
List of awards and nominations received by Play School
Award	Year	Recipient(s) and nominee(s)	Category	Result	Ref.
AACTA Awards	2016	Play School	Best Children's Television Series	Nominated	
AACTA Awards	2025	Play School: Big Ted's Time Machine	Best Children's Program	Nominated	
AACTA Awards	2026	Play School: All Together	Best Children's Program	Won	
AIMIA Awards	2014	Play School: Play Time	Best of Tablet – Entertainment	Won	
AIMIA Awards	2014	Play School: Play Time	Best of Tablet	Won	
AIR Awards	2023	Very Jazzy Street Party	Best Independent Children's Album or EP	Nominated	
ARIA Music Awards	1995	Oomba Baroomba	Best Children's Album	Nominated	
ARIA Music Awards	1997	In the Car	Best Children's Album	Won	
ARIA Music Awards	2000	Hullabaloo	Best Children's Album	Nominated	
ARIA Music Awards	2003	Hip Hip Hooray	Best Children's Album	Nominated	
ARIA Music Awards	2011	Let's Play Together	Best Children's Album	Nominated	
ARIA Music Awards	2015	Favourite Things – Songs and Nursery Rhymes from Play School	Best Children's Album	Nominated	
ARIA Music Awards	2016	Famous Friends: Celebrating 50 Years of Play School	Best Children's Album	Nominated	
ARIA Music Awards	2023	Very Jazzy Street Party	Best Children's Album	Nominated	
ARIA Music Awards	2026	Dance It Out	Best Children's Album	Pending	
Logie Awards	1990	Play School	Most Popular Children's Program	Nominated	
Logie Awards	1992	Play School	Most Popular Children's Program	Nominated	
Logie Awards	1993	Play School	Most Popular Children's Program	Nominated	
Logie Awards	1996	Play School	Most Popular Children's Program	Nominated	
Logie Awards	1998	Play School	Most Outstanding Achievement in Children's Television	Awarded	
Logie Awards	2000	Play School	Most Outstanding Children's Program	Nominated	
Logie Awards	2004	Play School	Most Outstanding Children's Preschool Program	Nominated	
Logie Awards	2006	Play School	Hall of Fame	Inducted	
Logie Awards	2014	Play School	Most Outstanding Children's Program	Nominated	
Logie Awards	2024	Play School	Best Children's Program	Nominated	
Logie Awards	2025	Play School	Best Children's Program	Nominated	
Logie Awards	2026	Play School	Best Children's Program	Won	

== Reception ==
Play School is the longest-running children's show in Australia and the second-longest-running children's show worldwide after British series Blue Peter, which has broadcast since October 1958.

=== Viewership ===
In February 2000, Play School averaged an audience of half a million nationally every day; it was the most-watched show by children under 12 in Australia. In 2003, it was estimated that 80% of Australian pre-school children under six watched the program at least once a week. In 2015, more than 10 million preschoolers tuned in to watch Play School on ABC iview. The program's two apps had over 90 million sessions and 550 million screen views. Although audience reach is one indicator of success, the program's primary aim since its earliest episodes has been to connect with children in ways that resonate with their everyday experiences.

=== Controversies ===
==== "Two mums" ====
On 31 May 2004, a "through the windows" segment narrated by Brenna Harding featured the sentence "My Mums are taking me and my friend Merryn to an amusement park". The clip was raised as controversial by sections of the media, and three federal ministers expressed dislike over the screening of the clip. The ABC responded, however, by saying that "Play School aims to reflect the diversity of Australian children, embracing all manner of race, religions and family situations".

==== Constructing a "bong" ====
A 2013 episode showed Alex Papps constructing a device which involved a straw inserted through the side of a plastic bottle, which was then filled with hot water, accidentally resembling a bong. This controversy arose again when the episode was replayed in 2015.

==== "Grooming" accusation ====
In October 2022, Courtney Act appeared on an episode of spin-off Play School: Story Time, where she read The Spectacular Suit by Kat Patrick. Her appearance generated considerable media attention when Senator Alex Antic took issue with the ABC inviting a drag queen to read a book to children about a girl who favoured wearing pants instead of a dress, which he described in a Senate Estimates hearing as "grooming". Questioning ABC managing director David Anderson, Antic asked why the ABC was "grooming Australian children with this sort of adult content" and asking Anderson whether such content was contributing to a "gender dysphoria problem". Anderson denied this, while Greens senator Sarah Hanson-Young accused Antic of using "deeply offensive" language. Act defended her appearance on Play School: Story Time in an opinion piece she wrote in The Sydney Morning Herald and during an appearance on The Project.

== Spin-off series ==
There have also been various spin-offs from Play School which have been played on ABC Kids, typically much shorter in duration. These include:

=== Big Adventure series ===
- Little Ted's Big Adventure
- Jemima's Big Adventure
- Big Ted's Big Adventure
- Humpty's Big Adventure
- Maurice's Big Adventure
- Joey's Big Adventure

=== Other series ===
- Play School: Story Time
- Play School: Art Time
- Play School: Celebrity Covers
- Play School: Nursery Rhyme News Time
- Play School: Art Crew
- Play School: Song Time
- Play School: Science Time
- Play School: Show Time
- Play School: Story Time: Languages
- Play School: Dance It Out

== See also ==
- List of longest-running Australian television series
- Play School (British TV series)
- Play School (New Zealand TV series)
