= Big Words, Small Stories =

Big Words, Small Stories is an animated Australian-Canadian children television series co-production, produced by Big Jump Entertainment and co-produced by Moody Street Kids in Australia, the series based on the book series of the same name written by Judith Henderson, it focuses on teaching children big words using small stories to teach them.

== Premise ==
Each episode follows one or several members of a revolving cast of characters, telling a simple story while using advanced vocabulary in order to teach children how to use that word.

== Cast ==
- Jenna Warren as Oleander
- Ian Bliss as Chaz / Various
- Natalie Bond as Abigail
- Sarah Ann Kennedy as Sprinkle Fairy
- Jessica Faulkner as Chrissy
- Leah Vandenberg as Davey's Mum / Various
- Jotie Gore as Papa Teddy
- Jacquie Brennan as Sally Mander / Various
- James Pidgeon as Crat

== Production ==
In 2018 it was announced that the series had its rights optioned by Big Jump Entertainment to become a television series.

On 21 May 2020, it was announced that the series was in production and would be produced by Big Jump Entertainment and be co-produced by Moody Street Kids.

On 26 May 2021, it was announced the series would air on TVOKids on 7 June 2021.
