= David McCubbin =

Australian actor

- Occupation: Actor
- Notable work: Jackaroo

David McCubbin is an Australian actor. He won the 1991 Logie Award for Most Popular Actor in a Telemovie or Miniseries for his role in Jackaroo.

McCubbin is a NIDA graduate who has hosted Play School, starred in Jackaroo and featured on A Country Practice, E Street and G.P.. On stage he played in You're a Good Man, Charlie Brown (Canberra Repertory Society, 1987), Henry V (Belvoir Street Theatre (1991), King Lear (The Wharf, 1991) and The African Queen (Gin Street Theatre 1995), In 1995 he help develop a Commonwealth Employment Services program for unemployed actors.

In Jackaroo McCubbin played the role of Jack Simmonds, a part Aboriginal stockman. The casting choice was criticised as he is not Aboriginal himself.
