= Leah Vandenberg =

Australian actress

- Born: New Zealand
- Occupations: Actress (theatre, television and film)
- Years active: 1997–present
- Known for: Play School; Savage River; The Letdown; Wellmania

Leah Vandenberg is a New Zealand-born Australian theatre, television, and film actress. She has appeared in many well-known Australian productions, including the award-winning Netflix series The Letdown and SBS drama The Hunting. She received an ASTRA nomination for "Most Outstanding Performance by an Actor-Female" in the comedy series Stupid, Stupid Man. She is a presenter on the long-running ABC television program Play School, a role she maintains today.

== Early life and education ==
Vandenberg was born in New Zealand to a Sri Lankan father, who had grown up in Fiji, and an Australian mother of Irish and Scottish heritage. She studied at the Western Australian Academy of Performing Arts, graduating in 1993.

== Career ==
Vandenberg has been a long serving host of Australian Children's television series Play School, in 2021 Vandenberg performed and wrote an episode of the series featuring Punjabi music.

On stage, Vandenberg has performed in Grace (Melbourne Theatre Company), Criminology (Arena Theatre Company), The Country (B Sharp @ Belvoir Street), The Perfumed Garden, The Taming of the Shrew, A Clockwork Orange, and Love and Understanding.

She received a 2007 ASTRA nomination of "Most Outstanding Performance by an Actor – Female" for her role as Anne in Stupid Stupid Man (series 1 and 2).

Vandenberg joined the filming of Netflix series Wellmania in the role of Dr Singh, appeared in ABC drama Savage River (TV series) and was later announced as part of the cast in Foxtel/Binge drama High Country.

In September 2025, Vandenberg was announced in the cast for the 2025 season of Queensland Theatre's Back To Bilo.

== Other activities ==
In 2021, Vandenberg was involved in a special project with the Biloela family where she would teach them in an online playgroup called Tree House Cubby.

== Filmography ==
Vandenberg has appeared in a wide range of genres in TV series as well as a few feature films, including:

=== Television appearances ===
Year	Title	Role	Notes
1995– 1999	Blue Heelers	Helene Lee	TV series; 2 episodes
1996	G.P.	Dr. Yasmin Richards	TV series; 12 episodes
1998	Never Tell Me Never	Physiotherapist	TV movie
1998– 1999	Wildside	Samira Nassar	TV series; 7 episodes
2000–	Play School	Herself	TV series; 250+ episodes
2000	The Games	Leah	TV series; 1 episode
2000– 2003	Grass Roots	Meera	TV series; 4 episodes
2002	Short Cuts	Psychologist	TV series; 1 episode
2002	BootLeg	Wendy	TV mini-series; 4 episodes
2002– 2003	MDA	Dr. Jane Bowen	TV series; 2 episodes
2003	Kath & Kim	Shop girl	TV series; 1 episode
2004	The Brush-Off	Claire Sutton	TV movie
2006– 2008	Stupid, Stupid Man	Anne Cassidy	TV series; 16 episodes
2008	East of Everything	Lara	TV series; 3 episodes
2008	Family Footsteps	Narrator	TV series; 4 episodes
2009	Snake Tales	Miranda Sailendra	TV series; 13 episodes
2010	Sleuth 101	Annie/Jessica	TV series; 2 episodes
2010	Tangle	Elle Rosenthal	TV series; 2 episodes
2016	The Wrong Girl	Meredith	TV series; 8 episodes
2017, 2019	The Letdown	Martha	TV series; 13 episodes
2019	The Hunting	Ravneet	TV mini-series; 4 episodes
2021	Big Words, Small Stories	Davey's Mum	TV series: 60 episodes
2022	Savage River	Deborah Cochrane	TV mini-series; 6 episodes
2023	Wellmania	Dr. Singh	TV mini-series; 7 episodes
2024-26	High Country	Tammy Samson	TV Series; 8 episodes
2025	Good Cop / Bad Cop	Skye	1 episode

=== Film appearances ===
Year	Title	Role	Notes	Ref
TBA	Written in the Stars	Aunty Preethi	Film	
2023	Inside	Jenny	Film	
2022	Here Out West	Ashmita		
2005	JewBoy	Sarita		
1999	Strange Planet	Sarah		
1999	Erskineville Kings	Lanny		
