= The Comedy Game =

Australian television show

The Comedy Game is an Australian television comedy anthology series that aired in 1971 and 1973 on ABC. The new comedies screened in the series were seen as possible pilots for a full television series.

The episodes led to the series Our Man in Canberra in 1971, A Nice Day at the Office in 1972, The Aunty Jack Show in 1972, Flash Nick From Jindivick in 1974 and Scattergood: Friend of All in 1975.

== Season 1 (1971) ==
=== A Nice Day at the Office ===
Aired 2 November 1971 (Sydney), 25 November (Melbourne). By Marcus Cooney and John Brendan. Plot: Harvey and Crisp work in the filing section of a government office.

- John Bell as Sean Crisp
- Neil Fitzpatrick as Ted Harvey
- Fay Kelton as Vicki Short
- Kevin Lesley as Claude Fogarty

=== Use No Hooks ===
Aired 9 November 1971 (Sydney), 2 December (Melbourne). The story of newlyweds George and Peggy Trump and their friends Gordon Bates and Leonard Cartaris. Produced by Maurice Murphy.

- Keith Lee
- John Hamblin
- Grahame Bond
- Max Meldrum
- Joan Bruce
- Tessa Malone
- Anthony Wagner
- Redmond Phillips

=== Our Man in Canberra ===
Aired 16 November 1971 (Sudneuy), 16 December (Melbourne). By John O'Grady.

- Jeff Ashby as Humphrey Sullivan
- Robyn Nevin as Kate Sullivan
- Walter Sullivan as The Minister
- Fred "Cul" Cullen as Fred Larkin
- Delore Whiteman as Mrs Wheeler
- John Meillon as Lift Mechanic

=== Gaudeamus Igitur ===
Aired 23 December 1971 (Melbourne). By Jenny Wager. A university department has had no professors or students for thirty years.

- Jacki Weaver
- Arna-Maria Winchester
- Joseph Furst
- Stanley Walsh
- Chris Haywood

=== Scattergood ===
Aired 9 December 1971 (Melbourne).

- Max Cullen
- Moya O'Sullivan
- Alfred Sandor

=== Aunty Jack’s Travelling Show ===
Aired 7 December 1971 (Sydney), 30 December 1971 (Melbourne). Writers include Geoffrey Atherdon Graham Bond, Sherman Merlick, Peter Weir. Music and lyrics by Bond and Rory O'Donoghue.

- Grahame Bond as Aunty Jack
- Kate Fitzpatrick as Airy Fairy

=== Arthur ===
Aired 14 December 1971 (Sydney), by Michael Aitkins. Arthur Potter is an out of work young man.

- Michael Aitkens as Arthur
- Sheila Kennelly
- Judy Morris
- Wendy Blacklock
- Hazel Phillips

== Season 2 (1973) ==
This series was produced by Bill Munro.

=== Fat Max ===
Aired 19 May 1973 (Sydney). By John O'Grady. About a 40 year old bachelor.

- Barry Lovett
- Graham Rouse
- Olivia Hamnett

=== Catch What I Mean? ===
Aired 26 May 1973. By John Dingwall. Set in a drivers pool at a city newspaper's office.

- John Meillon as Lift Mechanic
- Moya O'Sullivan
- Graham Rouse

=== Birth, Death, Marriage ===
Aired 9 June 1973 (Sydney), 23 June 1973 at 7:30 pm (Beverley), 7 November (Melbourne). Episode consisted of three separate plays, written by three different writers, satirising the human condition. By Maurice Wiltshire, Ray Biehler, Arthur Sherman.

- Garry McDonald
- Jacki Weaver
- Peter Sumner
- Willie Fennell
- Ros Spiers

=== The Engagement Party ===
Aired 30 June 1973.

- Ron Frazer
- John Krummel
- Sue Walker

=== Flash Nick from Jindavick ===
Aired 16 June and 23 June 1973 (Sydney), 14 and 21 Nov (Melbourne). By Grahame Bond.

- Grahame Bond
- John Meillon as Lift Mechanic
- Martin Harris
- Garry McDonald

=== The Only One Left ===
Aired 2 June 1973 (Sydney).

- Garry McDonald
- Terry Bader
- Walter Sullivan

=== Basically Black ===
Basically Black was the first television program written and created by Indigenous Australians, and starred:

- Aileen Corpus
- Gary Foley
- Zac Martin
- Bob Maza
- Bindi Williams
