= Karen Pang =

Australian actress

- Born: Australia
- Education: National Institute of Dramatic Art (NIDA)
- Occupations: Actress, television presenter
- Known for: Host of Play School

Karen Pang is an Australian film and television actress and presenter of Chinese descent. She is best known for presenting the children's show Play School since 1998.

== Biography ==
At the age of 4, Pang got interested in acting while watching Singin' in the Rain, but her parents wanted her to follow a more traditional career path, so she worked briefly in law, which she didn't like.

Pang studied theatre and media at university, and later graduated from the National Institute of Dramatic Art (NIDA), with a degree in Performing Arts (Acting).

She has been best known for being a presenter on children's program Play School, having been a presenter of the program since 1998, and she has also had roles in movies including Superman Returns, Safety in Numbers (2006 film), Danny Deckchair, The Nugget and Low Fat Elephants. She has also had several roles on mini-series and television, including Home and Away and All Saints.

In 2008 she was diagnosed with bipolar disorder.
