= Dragon's Mouth (play) =

- Original language: English
- Written by: J.B. Priestley; Jacquetta Hawkes
- Genre: Drama

Premiere
- Date: 13 April 1952
- Place: Malvern Festival

Dragon's Mouth is a 1952 play by Jacquetta Hawkes and her future husband novelist and playwright J.B. Priestley. Described in the text are as a quartet in two parts. It features four characters on a yacht trapped in quarantine off the West Indies, discussing life.

It premiered at the Malvern Festival before transferring to London's West End, at the Winter Garden Theatre (now the Gillian Lynne Theatre) running for 55 performances. It starred Rosamund John, Dulcie Gray, Michael Denison and Norman Wooland.

== Bibliography ==
- Wearing, J.P. The London Stage 1950-1959: A Calendar of Productions, Performers, and Personnel. Rowman & Littlefield, 2014.
