= Sofya Gollan =

Australian actress

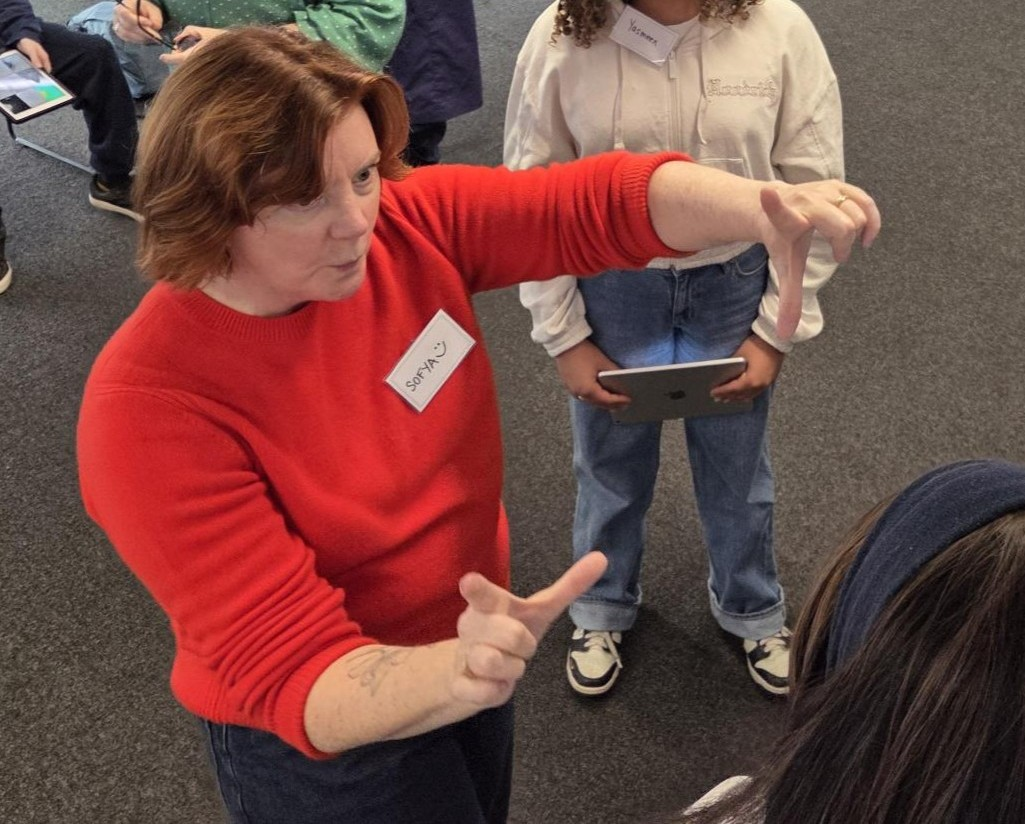
- Gollan teaching students at a Deaf filmmaking workshop in 2025
- Born: Australia
- Education: National Institute of Dramatic Art (NIDA)
- Occupations: Writer, filmmaker & television presenter
- Known for: Presenter of Play School

Sofya Gollan is an Australian writer, director, actress and filmmaker, best known as the longest-tenured presenter of Play School.

== Education and career ==
Gollan dropped out of high school when she was 16 to join the Australian and, then American National Theatres of the Deaf, where she learnt how to sign for the first time. She went on to graduate from the National Institute of Dramatic Art and obtain a master's degree in Directing from the Australian Film, Television and Radio School.

Gollan was invited to feature on Play School by producer Henrietta Clark, beginning in 1992. As of 2026, Gollan has continued to present on the show a few times each year, making her the longest running presenter in the program's history (34 years). She is credited with normalising disability and providing necessary on-screen representation for young Australians.

Gollan's work as a writer and director often centres around disability, including her notable short films Gimpsey and Imagined Touch. She has criticised poor, or superficial representation of people with disabilities in Australian media, and has emphasised the importance of casting disabled actors in these roles. Gollan advocates for funding and support for disabled access, who face challenges and ableism within the Australian screen industry. From 2016 to 2023, Gollan worked at Screen NSW as a development and production investment manager, including managing the Screenability Filmmakers Fund, which provides filmmaking opportunities for disabled artists. Gollan currently runs filmmaking workshops for Deaf public school students, and is a PhD candidate in film studies at ANU.

== Personal life ==
Gollan is Deaf, due to congenital rubella syndrome. She has worn a cochlear implant since 2006, but has also relied on interpreters over the course of her career.

Gollan is the daughter of writer and journalist Jean Bedford. She has two half-sisters by her stepfather Peter Corris, and one stepsister by Bedford's second marriage. As a child she was a competitive gymnast, and participated in equestrian gymkhanas. Gollan has two sons.
