= Don Spencer =

Australian children's TV presenter and musician (born 1937)

Don Spencer OAM
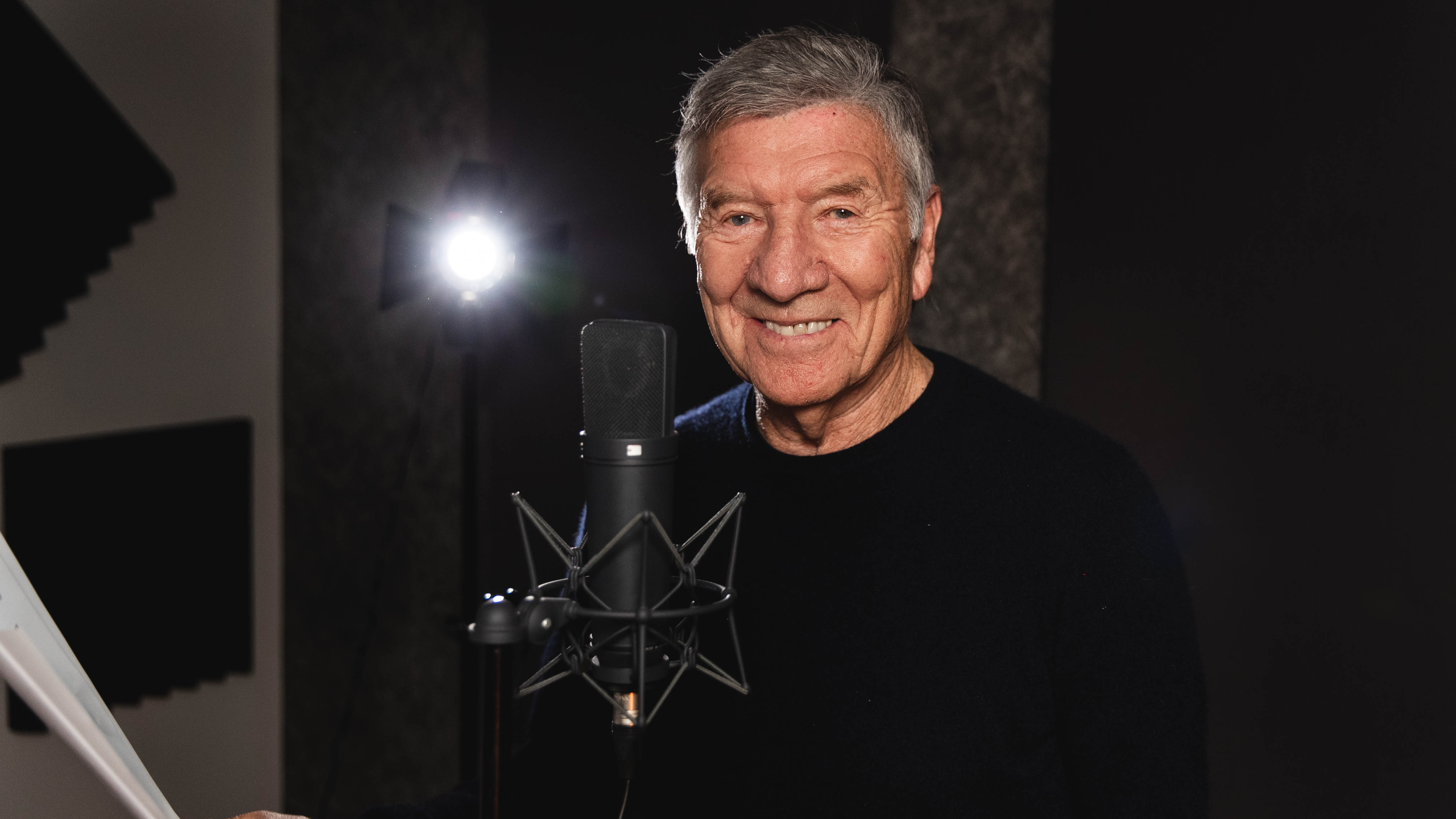
- Spencer in 2020
- Born: Donald Richard Spencer; 22 March 1937 (age 89); Tamworth, New South Wales, Australia
- Spouse: Julie Horsfall
- Children: 2, including Danielle
- Musical career
- Genres: Pop music; children's music
- Occupations: Singer; songwriter; musician; former TV presenter; writer; actor
- Instruments: Vocals; guitar
- Years active: 1962-present
- Labels: ABC Records, BBC Records, J & B Records
- Website: donspencer.com.au

Donald Richard Spencer (born 22 March 1937) is an Australian singer-songwriter, musician and former children's television presenter. He also hosted his own teenage television and radio music variety programs, including Gangway! and Pop-In.

He is best known, however, for his long tenure as a host on Play School on both the Australian version (1968–1992) (with guest appearances 1999, 2016, 2024) and the United Kingdom version (1972–86), one of only two presenters along with Diane Dorgan to have work on both versions.

In March 1963, his first single, "Fireball"—the theme tune to UK TV science fiction series Fireball XL5—reached No.32 on the UK Singles Chart. In 2002, Spencer established the Australian Children's Music Foundation. On Australia Day (26 January) 2007, he was awarded a Medal of the Order of Australia (OAM) with the citation "for service to children's music and television as a songwriter and performer, and through the establishment of the Australian Children's Music Foundation". Spencer married Julie Horsfall, they have two children: Dean, a musician; and Danielle, an actress and singer, who was married to actor Russell Crowe between 2003 and 2018.

In 2027, he will celebrate his 90th birthday and 65th year since his professional debut in the industry. In celebration of his album Feathers, Fur or Fins celebrating its 40th anniversary, it is being re-recorded in 2026 with artists performing his songs including The Wiggles, Rachael Beck, Tim Freedman, Justine Clarke, Rob Mills and his daughter Danielle Spencer and Spencer himself singing the theme song.

== Biography ==
=== Early life ===
Spencer was born in Tamworth during the depression era in 1937 to John Henry and Lillian May Spencer and attended Tamworth High School He attended Tamworth High School.

He initialally wanted to become a sportsman and played hockey as a teenager and competed in the Australian championships.

Don left Australia at the age of 17 travelled to Kenya, Africa, where he had an early career aspiration to become a Hockey player and he trained with the Kenyan hockey team, trying out for the Olympics. A chance meeting with locally born, British singer-songwriter, Roger Whittaker, in Nairobi inspired Spencer to buy a guitar and start his musical career.

== Career ==
=== Recording and performance career ===
In the early 1960s, Don Spencer moved to London and became a solo singer-guitarist, supporting various acts such as the Rolling Stones, the Four Seasons, The Hollies and Marianne Faithfull.

His first single, "Fireball", was released on the His Master's Voice label; it was the closing theme song for the television science fiction series Fireball XL5, written by Barry Gray. In March 1963, it reached No. 32 on the UK singles chart. Other singles included "Busy Doing Nothing", "Worried Mind", "Marriage Is for Old Folks", and a cover of the Beatles' 1965 song "In My Life". In 1964, he covered Brent Edwards' version of Johnny Madara and David White's track "Pride Is Such a Little Word".

== Television and radio ==
Spencer started his successful broadcasting career in the United Kingdom. At the BBC he presented his own teenage pop show Gangway! for seven years. He co-hosted a radio program called Pop-In. He later appeared in TV comedies such as Face It with Ronnie Barker.

Spencer returned to Australia and appeared on TV's Bandstand, briefly featured in series Sons and Daughters and Return to Eden and in the 1974 film Barry McKenzie Holds His Own. In 1977, Spencer wrote his next single, "What's a Pommie?" The track was covered by fellow Australians Rolf Harris and Col Elliott.

=== Play School: Children's entertainer ===
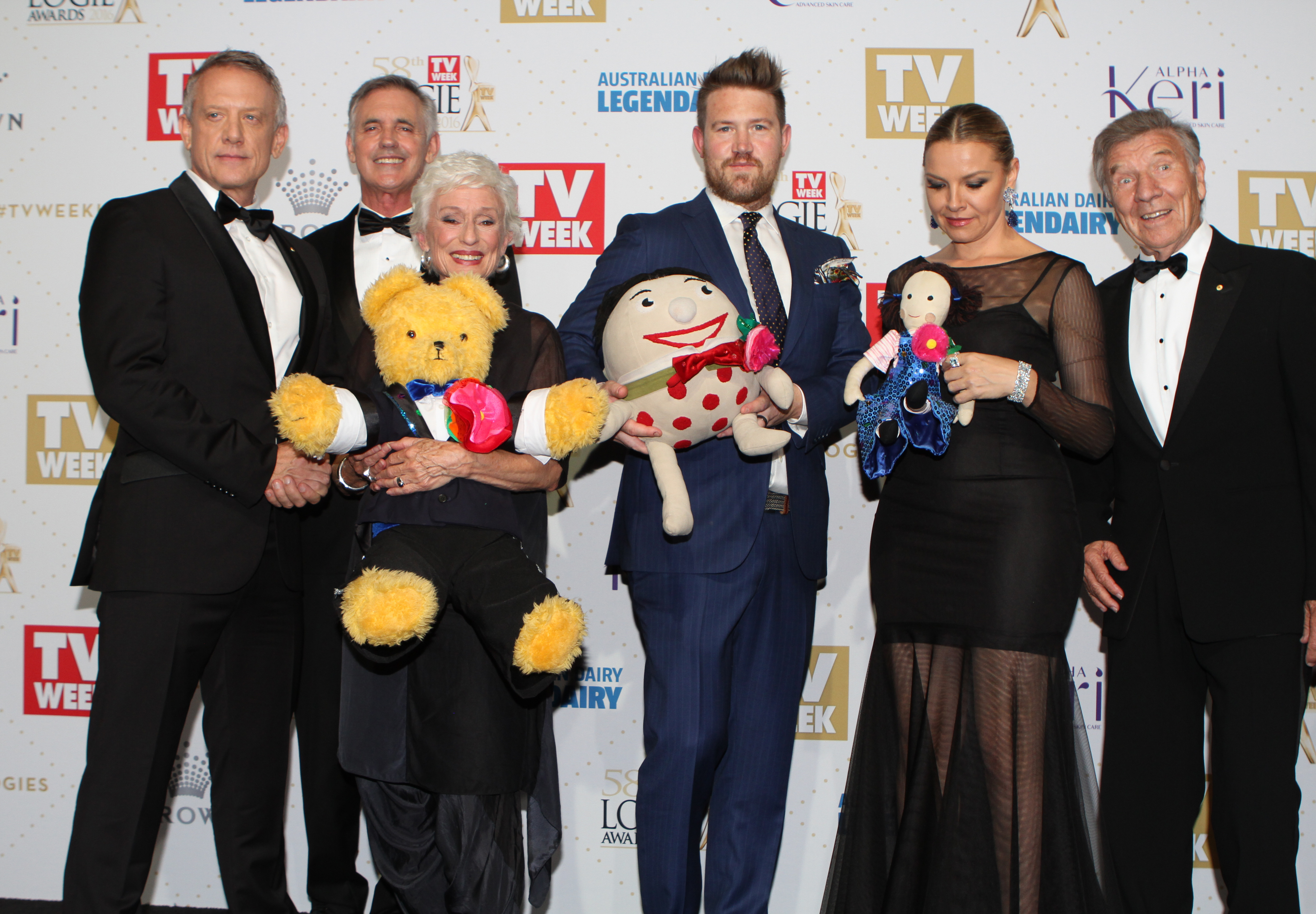
Don Spencer (far right), with Simon Burke, Benita Collings, Andrew McFarlane, Eddie Perfect and Justine Clarke in 2016

Spencer is best known for his long tenure as a children's entertainer, as both a presenter and recording artist, he joined the Australia TV series Play School in 1968 and the United Kingdom version of the same title in 1972. He continued on both versions for 17 years, the only male presenter to appear on both versions. One of his well-known phrases was "old magazines", which he used to effect when describing items used to make something. During this period, he recorded and released albums, primarily through ABC Records over a 27-year period that helped to educate children, mostly about the many species of Australian animals, and they in turn have received awards for gold and platinum sales. He continued on the Australian version until 1992 with guest appearance's in 1999, 2016 (for the 50th anniversary) and 2024.

== Music career ==
At the APRA Music Awards of 1995, Spencer's tracks "Have a Beaut Day" and "Stand Up" were nominated for Most Performed Children's Work; they were co-written by Spencer with Allan Caswell.

In 2002, Spencer established the Australian Children's Music Foundation (ACMF) as its inaugural CEO. In 2007, he was awarded a Medal of the Order of Australia (OAM) on Australia Day (26 January) for "service to children's music and television as a songwriter and performer, and through the establishment of the Australian Children's Music Foundation". In 2008, Spencer was awarded for Excellence in Community Support presented by Support Act Limited.

In December 2010, the ACMF sponsored a supergroup, Peacebeliever, which recorded a cover version of Plastic Ono Band's 1969 single "Give Peace a Chance" for their charity. Alongside Spencer, fellow vocalists include Katie Noonan, Blue King Brown, Tim Freedman, Newton Faulkner and Omara Portuondo. In July 2013, Spencer announced the ACMF's 11th annual National Kids Songwriting Competition, which is open to school-aged children from four to eighteen years old. Spencer said, "We want kids to unleash their creativity and engage with learning in a fun way ... Music can give kids really positive self expression and is a great tool for improving literacy levels".

As of 2023, Spencer continues to record and perform with his latest release a musical adaption, based on Rudyard Kipling's poem "If—".

== Personal life ==
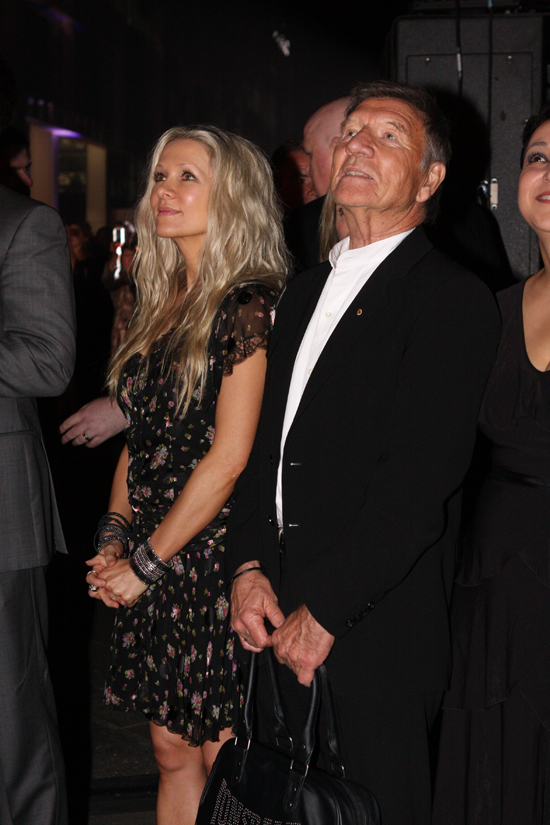
Spencer with his daughter Danielle in 2011

Don Spencer married Julie Horsfall, a caterer from Yorkshire. They have two children: Dean and Danielle Spencer (born 16 May 1969). Dean is a musician, while Danielle is an actress and singer, who was married to actor Russell Crowe from 2003 to 2018.

Spencer resides in Darlinghurst, New South Wales.

== Discography ==
=== Albums ===
Title	Details	Certification
Don Spencer from Play School sings 21 Children's Favourites	Released: 1984; Label: J&B (JB 095); Formar: LP	
Feathers, Fur or Fins	Released: 1985; Label: ABC Records (836 053–1); Format: LP, Cassette	ARIA: Gold
Hokey Cokey (with Chloe Ashcroft & Carol Chell)	Released: 1985 (UK); Label: BBC Records (REC 557); Format: LP	
Australian Animal Songs	Released: 1988; Label: ABC Records (836 054–1); Format: LP, Cassette, CD	ARIA: Platinum
Australia for Kids	Released: August 1989; Label: ABC Records (838 415–1); Format: LP, Cassette, CD	Peaked at number 77 on the ARIA charts; ARIA: Gold
Let's Have Fun	Released: 1990; Label: ABC Records (846 596–1); Format: LP, Cassette, CD	
The Best of Don Spencer	Released: August 1991; Label: ABC Records; Format: LP, Cassette, CD	Peaked at number 110 on the ARIA charts
Walkabout	Released: April 1992; Label: ABC Records; Format: LP, Cassette, CD	Peaked at number 128 on the ARIA charts
Have a Beaut Day	Released: 1994; Label: ABC Records (814 447–2); Format: CD	
The Ultimate Collection	Released: 2007; Label: ABC Records (E-301402–2); Format: 2×CD	

=== Charting singles ===
List of singles with selected chart positions
Title	Year	Peak chart positions
Title	Year	UK
"Fireball"/"I'm All Alone Again"	1962	32

=== Other singles ===
List of singles as featured artist, with selected chart positions
Title	Year	Peak chart positions
Title	Year	AUS
"The Garden" (as Australia Too)	1985	22
"If"	2023	—N/a
"Hold On To Your Dream"	2024	—N/a

== TV and filmography ==
- Bandstand – television series
- Barry McKenzie Holds His Own (1974)
- King's Men – television series (1976)
- Sons and Daughters – television series (1982)
- Return to Eden – television series (1986)
- A Country Practice – television series (1991)
- Play School – UK television series (1972–86)

== Awards ==
=== Tamworth Songwriters Awards ===
The Tamworth Songwriters Association (TSA) is an annual songwriting contest for original country songs, awarded in January at the Tamworth Country Music Festival. They commenced in 1986. Don Spencer won one award in that time.

Year	Nominee / work	Award	Result (wins only)
1995	"Pete the Lorikeet" by Don Spencer	Children's Song of the Year	Won

=== APRA Music Awards ===
Year	Nominated works	Award	Result	Ref
1995	"Have a Beaut Day"	Most Performed Children's Work	Nominated	
1995	"Stand Up"	Most Performed Children's Work	Nominated	

=== ARIA Music Awards ===
Year	Recipient(s) and nominee(s)	Category	Result	Ref.
1989	Australian Animal Songs	Best Children's Album	Nominated	
1990	Australia for Kids	Best Children's Album	Nominated	
1991	Let's Have Fun	Best Children's Album	Nominated	
1998	Australian Classics	Best Children's Album	Nominated	
2026	Feathers, Fur or Fins 40th Anniversary (Don Spencer and Friends)	Best Children's Album	Nominated	

=== AIR Awards ===
The Australian Independent Record Awards (commonly known informally as AIR Awards) is an annual awards night to recognise, promote and celebrate the success of Australia's Independent Music sector.

Year	Category	Result	Ref.
2024	Outstanding Achievement Award	awarded	

== Bibliography ==
Books written or co-written by Don Spencer:

- Spencer, Don; Caswell, Allen; Australian Broadcasting Corporation (1985). Feathers Fur or Fins. Woolloomooloo: Chappell & Intersong Music, Australian Broadcasting Commission. ISBN 0-94710-688-X.
- Spencer, Don; Caswell, Allan; Australian Broadcasting Corporation (1989). Don Spencer's Australian Animals. Sydney, NSW: ABC Enterprises for the Australian Broadcasting Corporation. ISBN 0-64212-841-3.
- Spencer, Don (1989). Don Spencer's More Songs from Feathers, Fur or Fins. Sydney, NSW: ABC Records.
- Spencer, Don (1990). Don Spencer's Let's Have Fun. North Sydney, NSW: Warner Chappell Music. ISBN 1-86362-023-0.
- Spencer, Don; Macken, Clare; Australian Broadcasting Corporation (1993). Don Spencer's Thumbs Up! Australia. Illustrated by Felicity Meyer. Sydney, NSW: ABC Books. ISBN 0-7333-0231-9.
- Spencer, Don; Bryant, Nick (2000). 1001 Cool Jokes with Don Spencer. Illustrated by Glen Singleton. Dingley Village: Hinkler Books. ISBN 1-86515-182-3.
- Sharkey, Jane; Holland, Margaret; Spencer, Don (2005). Sing and Learn Times Tables. Dingley Village: Hinkler Books. ISBN 978-1-74121-930-2.
- Spencer, Don (2011). Don Spencer's Don't Call Me a Koala Bear and Other Aussie Songs. Illustrated by Michelle Pike. Scoresby: Five Mile Press. ISBN 978-1-74300-135-6.
