= Our Man in the Company =

Australian comedy television series

Our Man in the Company is an Australian comedy series which screened on the ABC in 1973 and 1974. This series was a spin-off from the controversial series Our Man in Canberra, debuted in New South Wales on 7 July 1973 and ended on 27 August 1974.

== Our Man in Canberra ==
Our Man in Canberra had its origins in one episode of the anthology series The Comedy Game, which was broadcast in November 1971. The pilot was filmed outside the Old Parliament House. The first episode of the series was meant to air on 3 June 1972, written by John O'Grady. However, the series' production was cancelled in May 1972, due to legal reasons, with an episode costing $10,000 to film. The series was in breach of Section 116 (II) of the Broadcasting and Television Act of Australia. It was dropped in March 1973, resulting in the cast and the Australian Broadcasting Commission open to contempt charges of parliament.

== Cast ==
- Jeff Ashby as Humphrey Sullivan
- Katy Wild as Kate Sullivan
- Walter Sullivan as The Minister/The Director
- Delore Whiteman as Ena Wheeler
- Benita Collings as Turner
- Kerry McGuire as Marcia
- Lex Mitchell as Pub Philosopher
- Graham Rouse as Pub Philosopher
- Reg Gorman as TV Technician

== See also ==
- List of Australian television series
