= Little Boy Lost =

Little Boy Lost may refer to:

- "The Little Boy Lost", a simple lyric poem by William Blake from his Songs of Innocence series
- "A Little Boy Lost", a later poem by William Blake from his Songs of Experience series
- A Little Boy Lost, a 1905 novel by William Henry Hudson
- Little Boy Lost (novel), a 1949 novel by Marghanita Laski
- Little Boy Lost (sculpture), a silicon sculpture by Australian artist Paul Trefry
- Little Boy Lost (1953 film), a 1953 film based on Laski's book starring Bing Crosby
- Little Boy Lost (1978 film), a 1978 Australian film based on the true story of a missing child, Stephen Walls.
- "Little Boy Lost" (The Twilight Zone), a 1985 episode of The Twilight Zone
- "Little Boy Lost" (song), a song by Johnny Ashcroft
