= Big Boy =

Big Boy, Bigboy or Big Boys may refer to:

== Food ==
- Big Boy Restaurants, the overall restaurant chain and franchises
  - Bob's Big Boy, the original California-based regional restaurant chain
  - Frisch's Big Boy, the Ohio-based regional restaurant chain
- Big Boy tomato

== People ==
- Big Boy (nickname), a list of people
- Big Boy (radio host) (born 1969), host on Los Angeles station KRRL
- Bigboy Matlapeng (born 1958), Botswanan long-distance runner
- Perrance Shiri (Bigboy Samson Chikerema, 1955–2020), Zimbabwean air marshal

== Film and theater ==
- Big Boy (musical), a 1925 Broadway production starring Al Jolson
- Big Boy (film), a 1930 musical comedy starring Al Jolson as a jockey riding the horse Big Boy
- Big Boys (TV series), a British television sitcom
- Big Boys (film), a 2023 film

== Music ==
=== Artists ===
- Big Boys (band), a band
- Arthur Crudup (1905–1974), American singer and guitarist
- Big Boy Goudie (1899–1964), American jazz musician
- Arthur "Big Boy" Spires (1912–1990), American blues singer and guitarist
- Big Boy (rapper) (born 1975), Puerto Rican rap and reggaeton songwriter born Gustavo Roy Diaz in 1975

=== Albums ===
- Big Boy (EP), by Charlotte Cardin
- Big Boy, an album by eLDee

=== Songs ===
- "Big Boy" (song), by The Jackson 5
- "Big Boy", a song by Sparks in the film Rollercoaster
- "Big Boy", a song by from20 from Rated R (2026)
- "Big Boys", a song by Elvis Costello from Armed Forces (1979)
- "Big Boys", a song by Chuck Berry from Chuck (2017)
- "Big Boys" (song), a song from a Saturday Night Live comedy sketch

== Other uses ==
- Big Boy Junction, Tennessee, an unincorporated community
- Big Boy Peak, a mountain in Idaho
- Union Pacific Big Boy, a class of steam locomotives
- Big Boy (Dick Tracy), a character in the Dick Tracy franchise
- Henry Big Boy, a rifle by Henry Repeating Arms
- Atrax christenseni, an Australian spider species nicknamed "big boy"

== See also ==
- Peter Miller (musician) (born 1942), English singer, songwriter and record producer also known as "Big Boy Pete"
- Big Boi (born 1975), American musician
- Little Boy (disambiguation)
