= Little Boy (disambiguation) =

Little Boy was the codename of the atomic bomb dropped on Hiroshima.

Little Boy may also refer to:

- Boy, a young human male
- Little Boy: The Arts of Japan's Exploding Subculture, a 2005 book about Japanese postwar culture
- Little Boy (film), a 2015 American film
- Little Boy (album), an album by Janno Gibbs
- "Little Boy" (Captain Jack song)
- "Little Boy" (The Crystals song)
- "Little Boy", a song by Miriam Makeba from The World of Miriam Makeba
- "Little Boy", a song by Vance Joy from Nation of Two
- "Little Boys", a 2007 episode of the television series How I Met Your Mother

== See also ==
- Little Boy Blue (disambiguation)
- Little Boy Lost (disambiguation)
