= Johnny Ashcroft =

Australian country musician and folk entertainer (1927–2021)

Johnny Ashcroft OAM
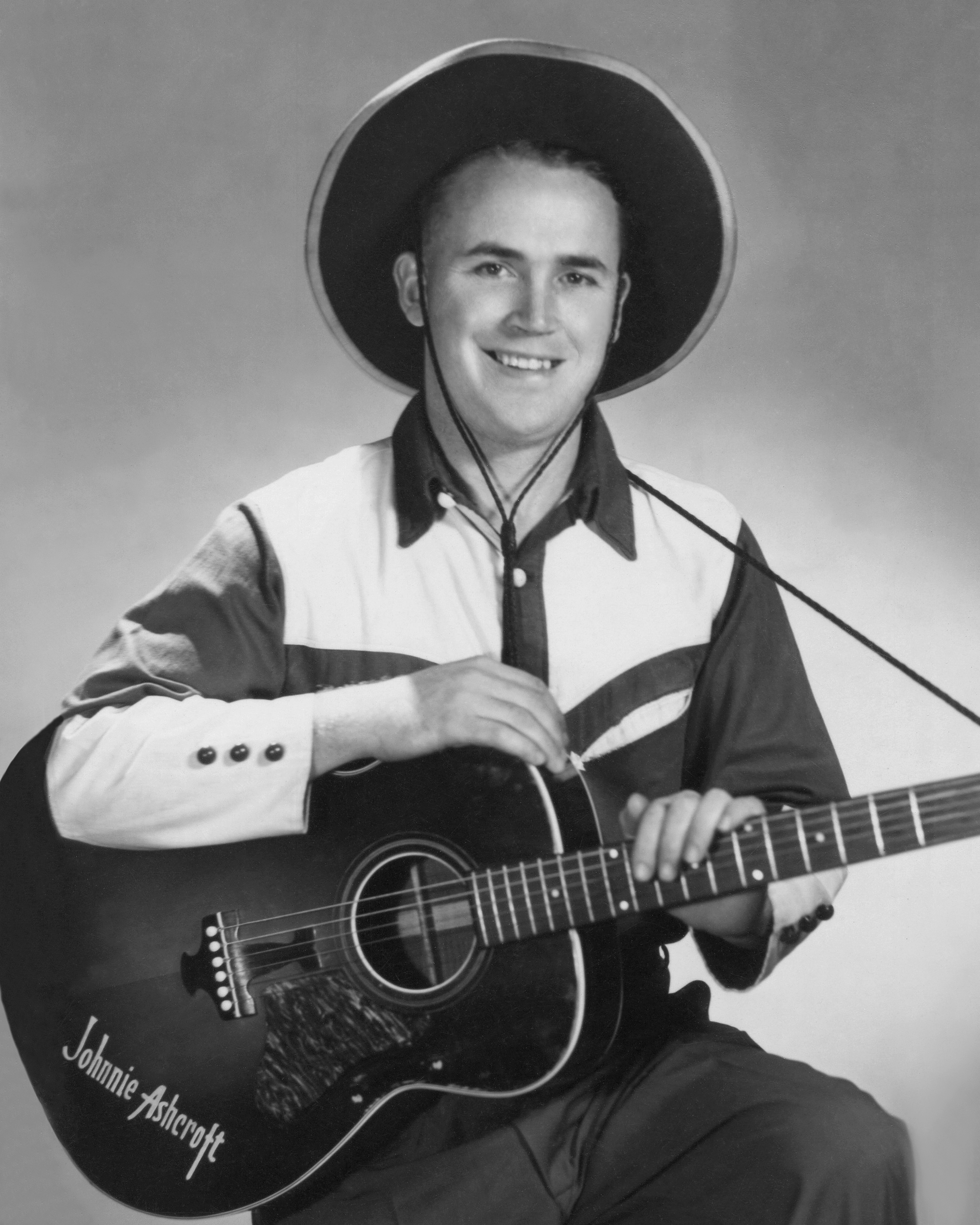
- Ashcroft in 1948, with 1935 Gibson Acoustic Guitar

Background information
- Born: John Lewis Ashcroft; 1 February 1927; North Sydney, New South Wales, Australia
- Died: 19 May 2021 (aged 94) Sydney, New South Wales, Australia
- Genres: Country; folk; skiffle; jazz; pop
- Occupations: Singer; songwriter; musician
- Years active: 1946-2021
- Website: www.johnnyashcroft.com.au

John Lewis Ashcroft OAM FAIHA (1 February 1927 – 19 May 2021) was an Australian country music and folk entertainer, singer, songwriter, and musician, who also recorded pop, skiffle, jazz, and disco as his alter ego, the Baron. He was married to fellow performer Gay Kayler, with whom he recorded on numerous occasions.

== Career ==
=== 1927–1953: Early personal and show business background ===
As a child growing up during the Great Depression in Australia, Ashcroft lived in a bag shack with a dirt floor. An interest in Indigenous cultures, in particular Australian Aboriginal culture, was possibly influenced by these humble beginnings.

During World War II, Ashcroft began his career by playing guitar and singing mainly bush ballads. Ashcroft's first recording took place in 1946. It was "When I Waltzed My Matilda Away", and was distributed solely for radio airplay.

In the mid-1940s he traveled with vaudeville shows. While working in The Great Levante Show, he learned about show business traditions and the psychology of live performing from the Great Levante (Les Cole) and one of Australia's greatest vaudevillian comics, Bobby Lebrun. Bobby Lebrun Mo Fellowship Award

=== 1954–1972: Early recordings ===
In 1954, Ashcroft laid down his first commercial recordings, six 78 rpm sides for Rodeo Records. This was followed by his debut album Songs of the Western Trail in 1956, which was Australia's and New Zealand's first country and western vinyl microgroove album. It contained "Highway 31", Australia's and New Zealand's first trucking song.

Ashcroft was the first Australian country artist to appear on Australian TV. In 1956, as the Australian Broadcasting Commission began transmitting from its tiny Arcon Studio at Gore Hill, Sydney, Johnny wrote and sang the show's title theme, "Crazy Cross". He also performed in the show, which was set in Sydney's King's Cross, with actor Gordon Chater serving as its anchorman.

In 1957, Ashcroft recorded Gordon Parsons's, A Pub with No Beer with Graeme Bell. This 45rpm was also released in the US and during a beer strike in Canada. It was not only available on vinyl but anecdotally sold 110,000 copies in Australia, on plastic-coated cardboard records.

They're a Weird Mob, recorded in late 1958, also included the doyens of Australian jazz: Graeme Bell, Don Burrows, John Sangster, George Thompson, Ron Falson together with Noel Smith from the Royal Ballet Orchestra. This skiffle song became Ashcroft's first hit single.

Although the term had not yet been coined, Ashcroft's 1960 song, "Little Boy Lost", was Australia's first country-rock song.

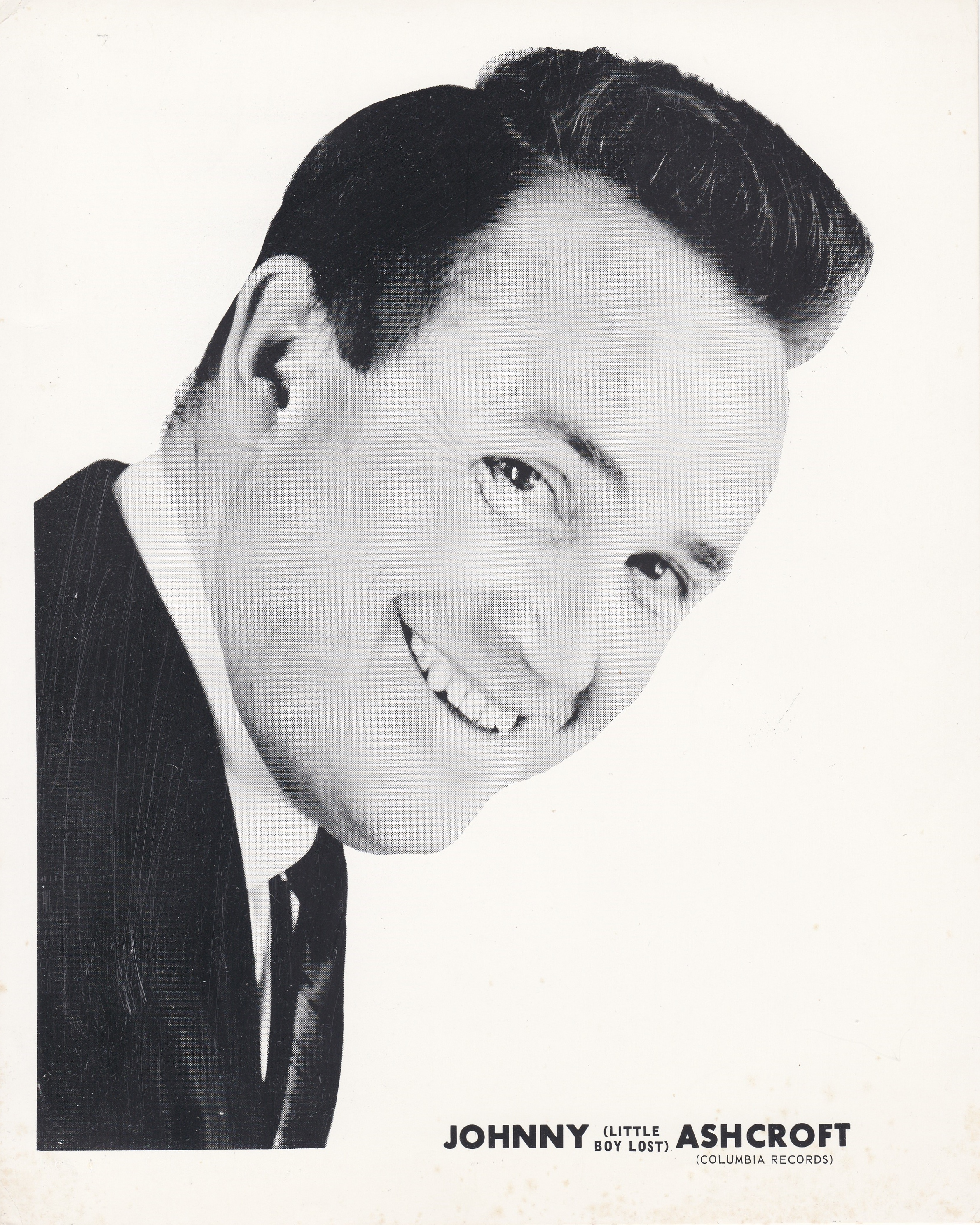
Johnny Ashcroft recorded his smash hit composition, Little Boy Lost, for Columbia Records

Again, it was arranged and recorded by jazzmen, including guitarist George Golla. This song, written by Ashcroft from DJ Tony Withers's idea, tells the story of Steven Walls who became lost from his parents' property at Tubbamurra near Guyra, NSW. Five thousand people and seven aircraft, together with Aboriginal tracker William Stanley, searched the rugged bush country, which was rife with dingos and deadly snakes. He was found alive and well four days later. The search for the Little Boy Lost continues to be Australia's biggest land and air search.

At the height of "Little Boy Lost"'s success, Ashcroft withdrew his recording from airplay out of consideration for the family of 8-year old Graeme Thorne, the victim of Australia's first kidnapping.

"Little Boy Lost" was Australia's first 45 rpm Gold Record, and New Zealand's first Gold Record. The painting, Little Boy Lost by Sir Sidney Nolan, hangs in the Broken Hill Regional Art Gallery. Accession No. 1984.0001

His album Mostly Folk, recorded in the mid-1960s, was re-released under the title, Little Boy Lost and went Gold. Mostly Folk, Cat. No.: Columbia 330SX 7734, and Little Boy Lost, Cat. No.: Columbia OEX 9511 are identical

The Little Boy Lost movie had its world premiere on 16 November 1978 at Armidale in the New England region of NSW. Johnny Ashcroft recorded a new version of "Little Boy Lost" with Gay Kayler, which was played at the end. They also recorded the voices on the movie sound track. Ashcroft made a fleeting cameo appearance as one of the exhausted searchers by the camp fire.

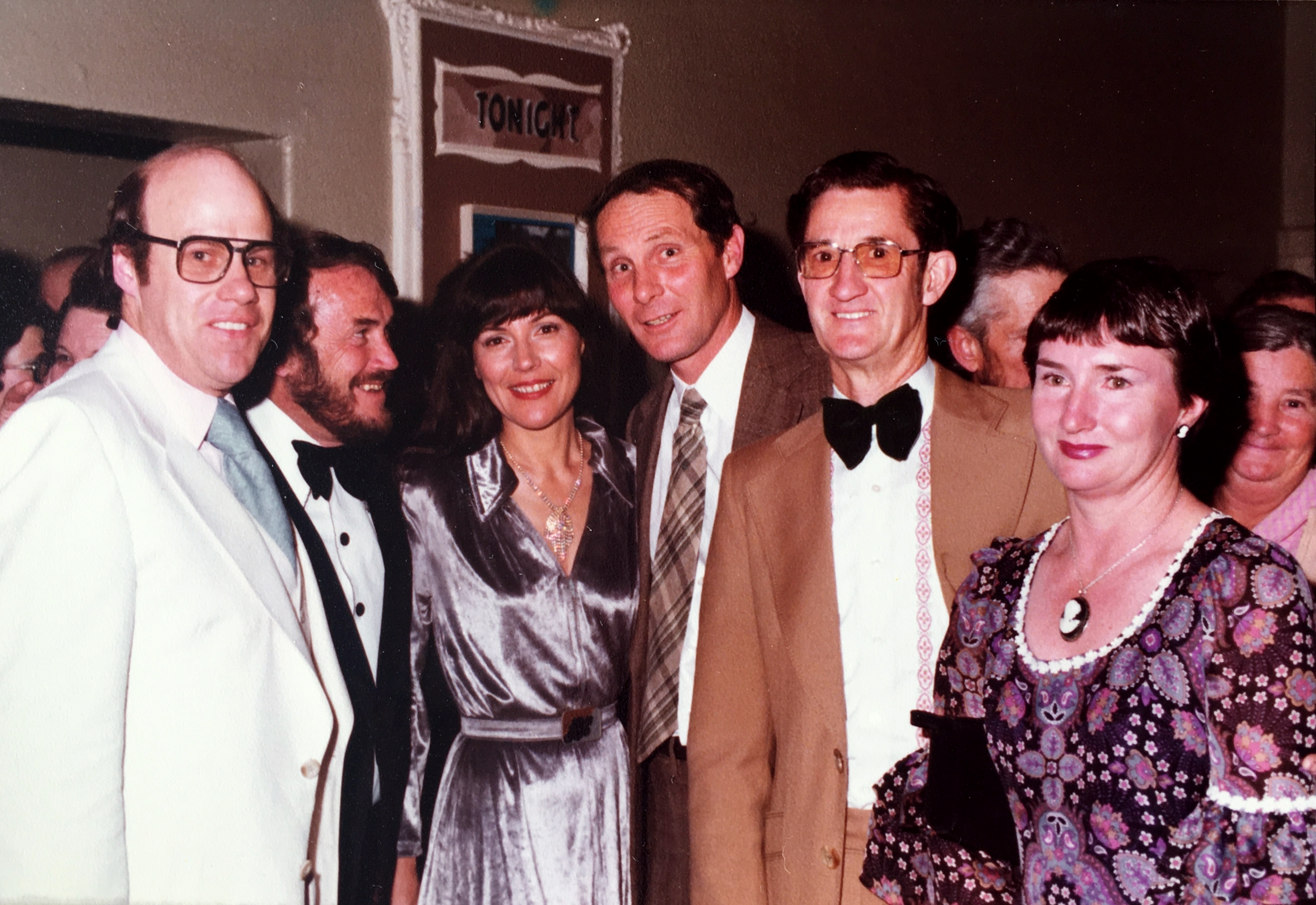
Johnny Ashcroft and Gay Kayler with country music identities at the Little Boy Lost movie premiere

Johnny Ashcroft was the first country artist in Australia to have Gold Records presented on stage, when three were bestowed simultaneously before a live audience in Tamworth, in 1971.

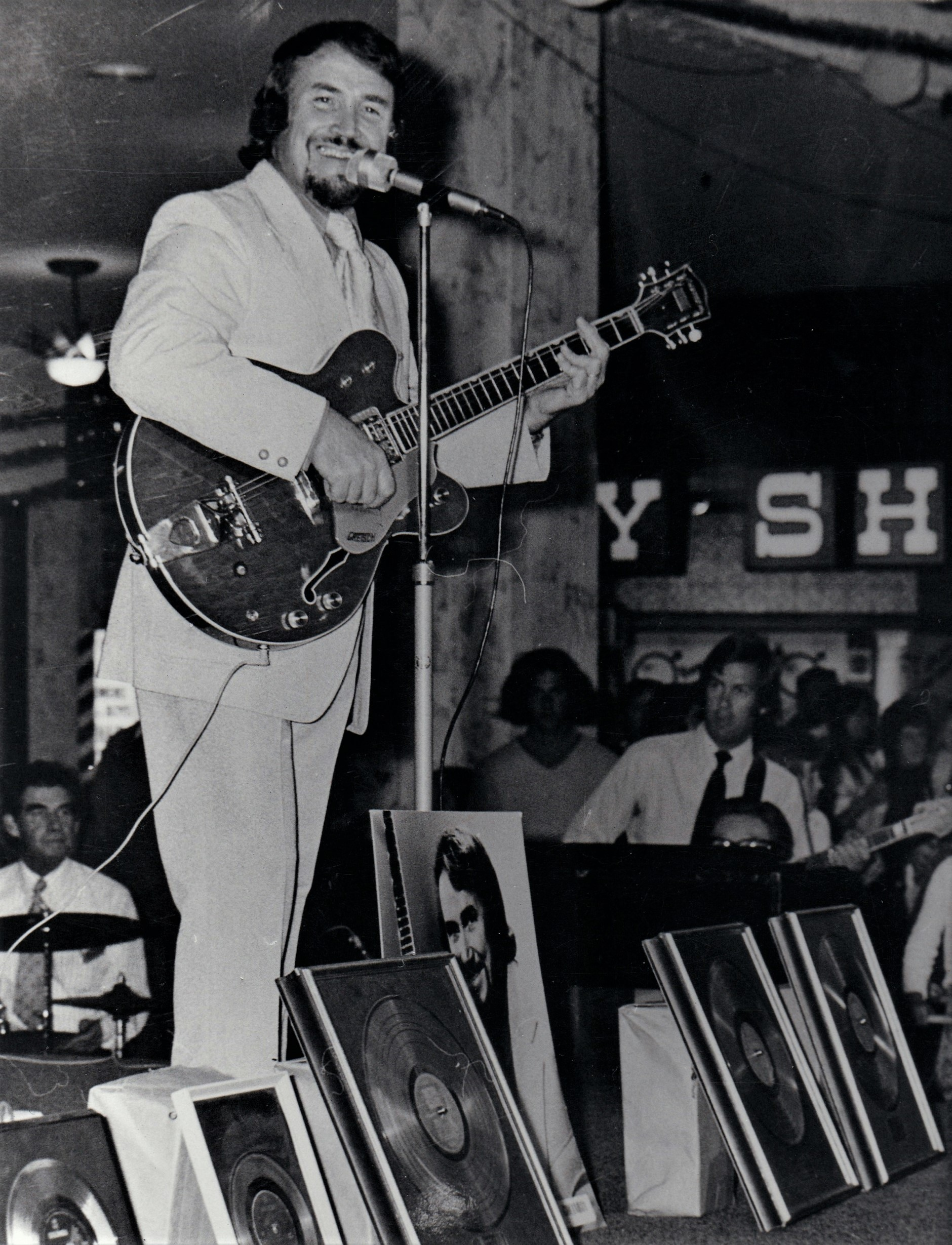
Johnny Ashcroft with his 5 Gold Records awarded between 1960 and 1971 in Tamworth

During the ceremony, Ashcroft suggested that Tamworth might consider annual country music record-award presentations in that city. Consequently, two years later, in 1973, Tamworth began promoting itself as Australia's country music capital. With Golden Guitars designed by John Minson, Tamworth had started its journey to eventually become recognised as one of the world's top ten music festivals (2002). History of Country Music in Australia

=== 1973–1990: Continued success ===
In 1973, Johnny Ashcroft and Gay Kayler (Kahler) commenced working together, and recorded their Faces Of Love album. Each featured in solo performances and duets.

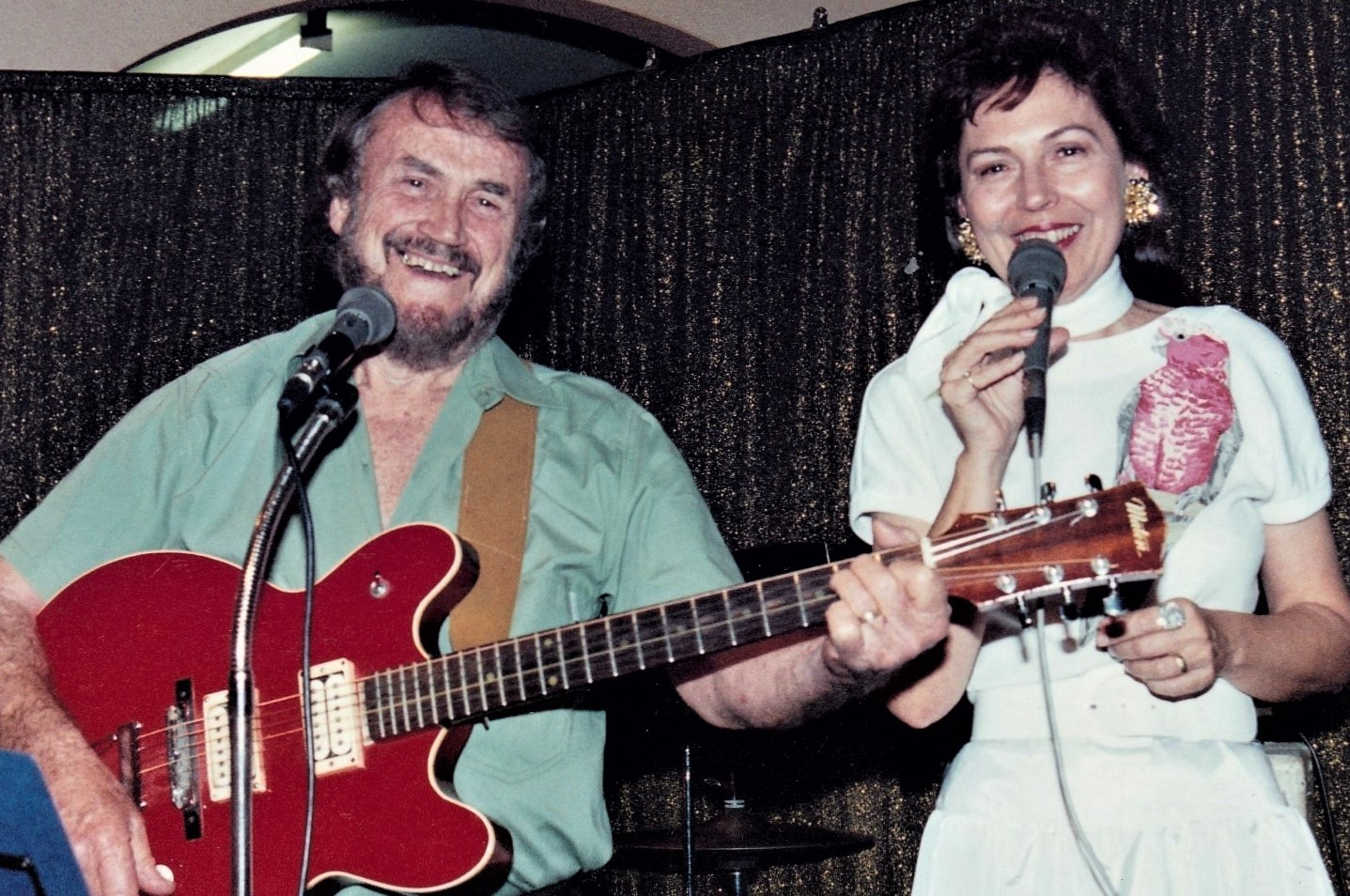
Johnny Ashcroft and Gay Kayler were proud of their Australian image

That same year, Ashcroft recorded his fourth hit – an American pop song, Clint Holmes's "Playground In My Mind", which made No. 1 on general charts.

In January 1974, Johnny and Gay performed at the Sydney Opera House, four months after its opening, when they topped the bill in the first all-Australian country music show, as part of the Australian Festival of Performing Arts. Eight weeks later they starred in the Australian Variety Show, again in the main Concert Hall of the Sydney Opera House. Both shows were markedly different. They appeared eight times in this iconic venue.

Ashcroft's 1975 song, "Holy Joe the Salvo", became the Salvation Army's 1975 Red Shield Appeal Song. Its popularity was responsible for the Sallys becoming known as the Salvos.

Also in 1975, Johnny Ashcroft wrote Australia's first female trucking song, "My Home-Coming Trucker's Coming Home", for Gay Kayler to record. It became a country hit, which was also programmed into general airplay.

Johnny's 1978 LP And The Band Played Waltzing Matilda, included a faithful cover-reproduction of Fredrick McCubbin's 1889 painting, Down On His Luck.

In another departure from modern country music, Ashcroft appeared on the album, A Time for Change, as his disco-singing alter ego, the Baron. The album also featured Gay Kayler, Ashcroft's partner (and wife), as Lady Finflingkington, the Baron's jazz-scatting, eccentric consort.

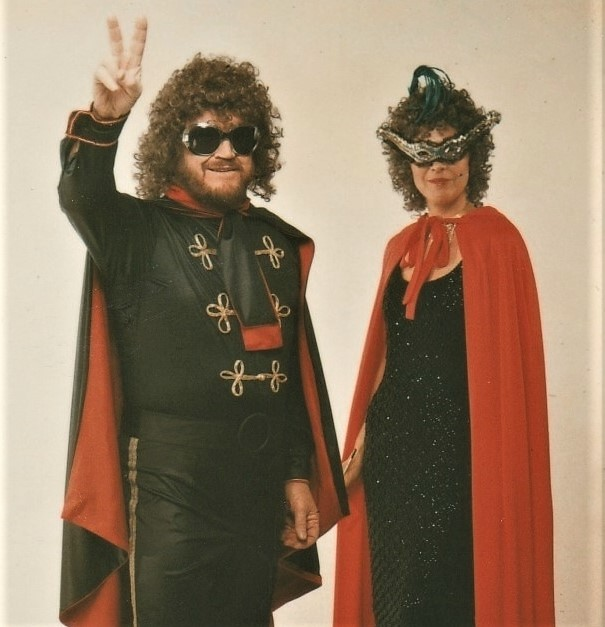
The Baron & Lady Finflingkington

From this LP, the Baron released "Sixteen Tons of Hit the Road Jack", a 12-inch disco single.

In 1989, the milestone historical album, The Cross of the Five Silver Stars, featuring Johnny Ashcroft, Gay Kayler, Bettybo and their musical director, Rob (Shep) Davis, was a finalist for the Heritage Award in Tamworth's Australasian Country Music Awards.

=== Production Shows ===
Johnny Ashcroft combined a major part of his career with Australian country music star, Gay Kayler, whom he married in 1981. Although they created a reputation as a show-stopping duo, they still retained their individuality by incorporating solo highlights within their performances.

Their production shows, such as The Imagine That! Australiana Show, Here's To You, Australia!, The Goodtime Gotcha Show and Everything But The Drover's Dog, often included comedy segments with Gay and Johnny as themselves, and also as their alter egos, The Baron and Lady Finflingkington (The Baron's consort), who sang disco.

Parallel with their adult production shows, Johnny Ashcroft and Gay Kayler spent eleven years presenting Australian history to more than 750,000 school children with songs, stories and visuals in their NSW Education Department accredited shows.

In 2004, Johnny and Gay were adopted into the Gamilaraay Nation by Gamilaraay elder, Centennial Medal holder and United Nations keynote speaker, Barbara Flick, because of their "ground-breaking" presentations of Australia's First Nations people, both traditional and present day, and for their stance against racism.

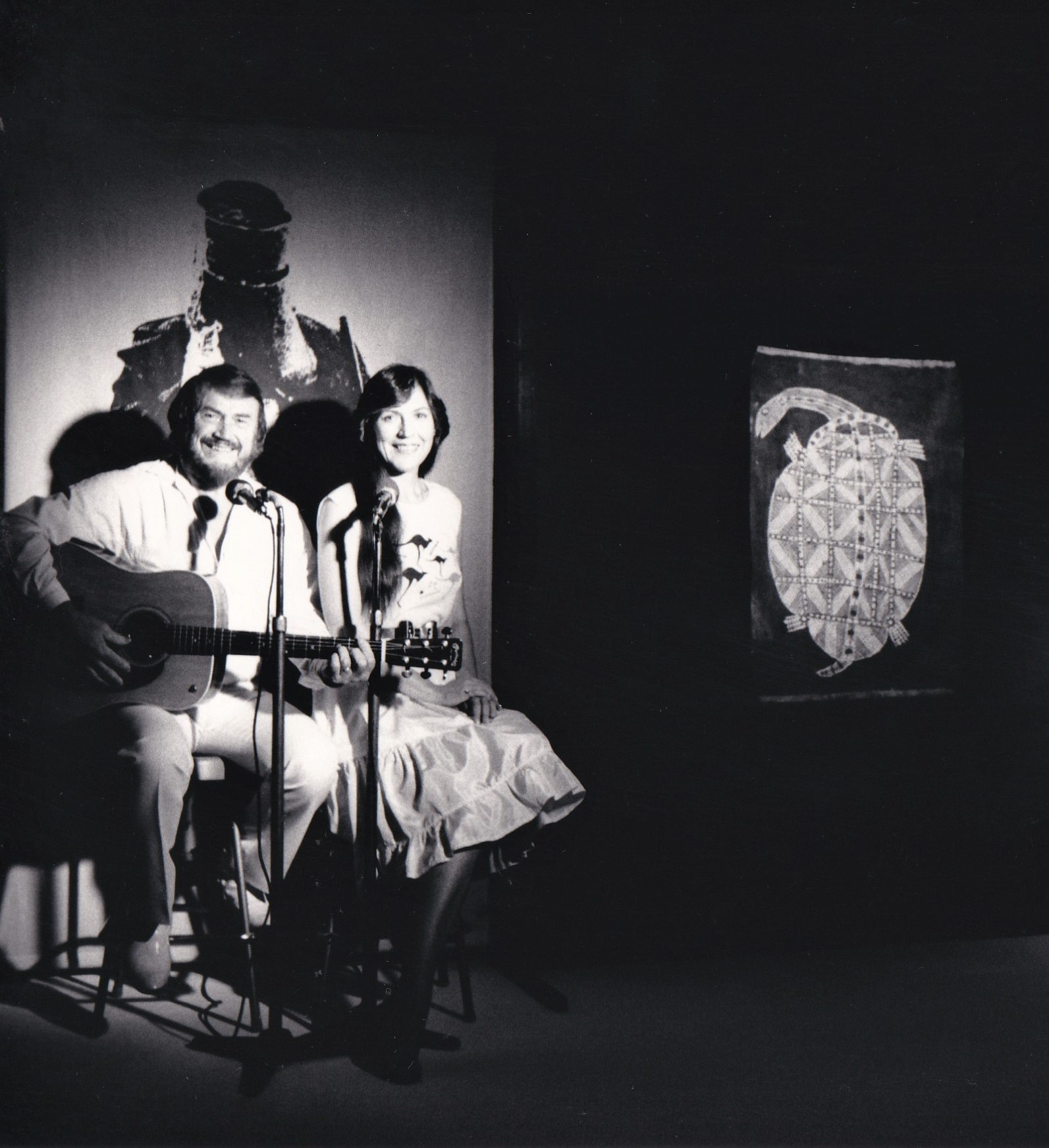
Johnny Ashcroft & Gay Kayler Australiana show

== Death ==
Ashcroft died on 19 May 2021, aged 94.

== Legacy ==
The Johnny Ashcroft and Gay Kayler Legacy Collection was presented to the Australian Country Music Hall of Fame in Tamworth (Gamilaraay Country) on 28 May 2022, with a Welcome to Country and Smoking Ceremony.

Nine hundred and seventy-seven items, plus seventy-nine recordings, a variety of posters and eighteen recorded backgrounds joined their artefacts already in the Museum. Little Boy Lost, the Search, Song, Movie and Beyond (one hundred and three items) was part of this collection.

== Discography ==
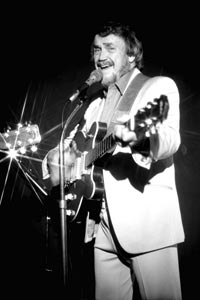
Ashcroft performing live in the 1980s

=== Albums ===
Title	Details
Songs of the Western Trail First vinyl C&W album recorded in Australia Features Australia's first trucking song, Highway 31	Released: 1956; Label: Philips (P 10815 R)
Mostly Folk	Label: Columbia (330SX 7734)
One More Time Around	Released: 1966; Label: EMI Music (OEX 9442)
You And I – Country Style Two Gold Records (with Kathleen McCormack)	Released: 1967; Label: Columbia (SOEX-9463)
Little Boy Lost Gold Record	Released: 1968; Label: Columbia (SOEX-9510)
Johnny Ashcroft Now Gold Record	Released: 1969; Label: Columbia (SOEX-9564)
Our Kinda Country (Featuring Little Boy Lost)	Label: Columbia (SPR 1)
Johnny Ashcroft Unlimited	Released: 1970; Label: Columbia (SOEX-9656)
Heaven Help Us All	Released: 1971; Label: Columbia (SOEX-9823)
Johnny Ashcroft Live At Wentworthville Leagues Club	Released: 1971; Label: Columbia (SOEX-9848)
Dusty Road (Featuring Bullroarer)	Label: MFP (A-8113)
They All Died Game	Released: 1971; Label: Music for Pleasure (MFP 8218)
Australian Songs Go Continental (Features Ashcroft/Halford melodies from They All Died Game album)	Label: Minstrel (LPMB 2005)
Johnny Ashcroft Country (Songs Based on Authentic Stories of Australian Bushrangers)	Released: 1972; Label: Columbia (SOEX-9967)
Requests	Released: 1972; Label: Axis (AXIS 6046)
Face of Love (duets and solos with Gay Kayler)	Released: 1973; Label: Columbia (SOEX-10089)
People, Places and Gertrude (Featuring Johnny's true-story composition A Song For Danny with Gay Kayler)	Released: 1975; Label: RCA Victor (SP 164)
KY Country 2KY 50 Years (Featuring Holy Joe, the Salvo)	Released: 1975; Label: RCA (VCL1-0101)
I've Got a Thing About Trains (With historic steam train sounds)	Released: 1976; Label: RCA Victor (SP 175)
And the Band Played Waltzing Matilda	Released: 1977; Label: RCA Victor (VPL1-0157)
Johnny Ashcroft in Little Boy Lost Country Includes Little Boy Lost movie version (with Gay Kayler) Just Another Long Lost Love (with Gay Kayler) Street Singer (duet with Gay Kayler)	Released: 1978; Label: RCA Victor (VPL1-0173)
RCA Country Club Tamworth 1979 Featuring Heroes	Released:1979; Label: RCA (PROMO 43)
Country Cream Featuring Old Blue Cattle Dog On the Inside (duet with Gay Kayler)	Released: 1979; Label: Selection PRML 011
Streetsinger Featuring Street Singer (duet with Gay Kayler) Little Boy Lost movie version (with Gay Kayler) Just Another Long Lost Love (with Gay Kayler)	Released: 1981; Label: RCA Victor (DPL 609)
A Time For Change (Featuring Imagine That!, duet with Gay Kayler, and alter egos the Baron and Lady Finflingkington)	Released: 1981; Label: RCA (VAL1 0354)
Australia's Musical Heritage Sydney Morning Herald's 150th Anniversary (Featuring The Old Bark Hut)	Released: 1981; Label: ABC (SMH150)
Australia Our Land Our Music (Featuring We'll All Die Game)	Released: 1982; Label: EMI (AUST.1-2)
A Tribute To Buddy Williams (Featuring Buddy Williams, Johnny Ashcroft and Gay Kayler)	Released: 1985; Label: Axis (AX.701410)
The Cross of the Five Silver Stars (with Gay Kayler, Bettybo and Shep Davis) Finalist for the Heritage Award in the Australasian Country Music Awards	Released: 1989; Label: Jade Records (JADLP1009)
Sharing Featuring The Fields Of Athenry (duet with Gay Kayler)	Released: 1995; Label: Selection (PCD 082)
They're a Weird Mob (Cover Notes by Gay Kayler)	Released: 1999; Label: Larrikin Records (D24116)
Johnny Ashcroft, Here's To You, Australia! 28-track, double CD set with Gay Kayler, Bettybo & Shep Davis	Released:2007; Label: Rajon (CDR1066)

== Awards ==
Johnny Ashcroft was awarded the Medal of the Order Of Australia (OAM) in 1991 for his contribution to the Arts, the entertainment industry and Indigenous social justice.

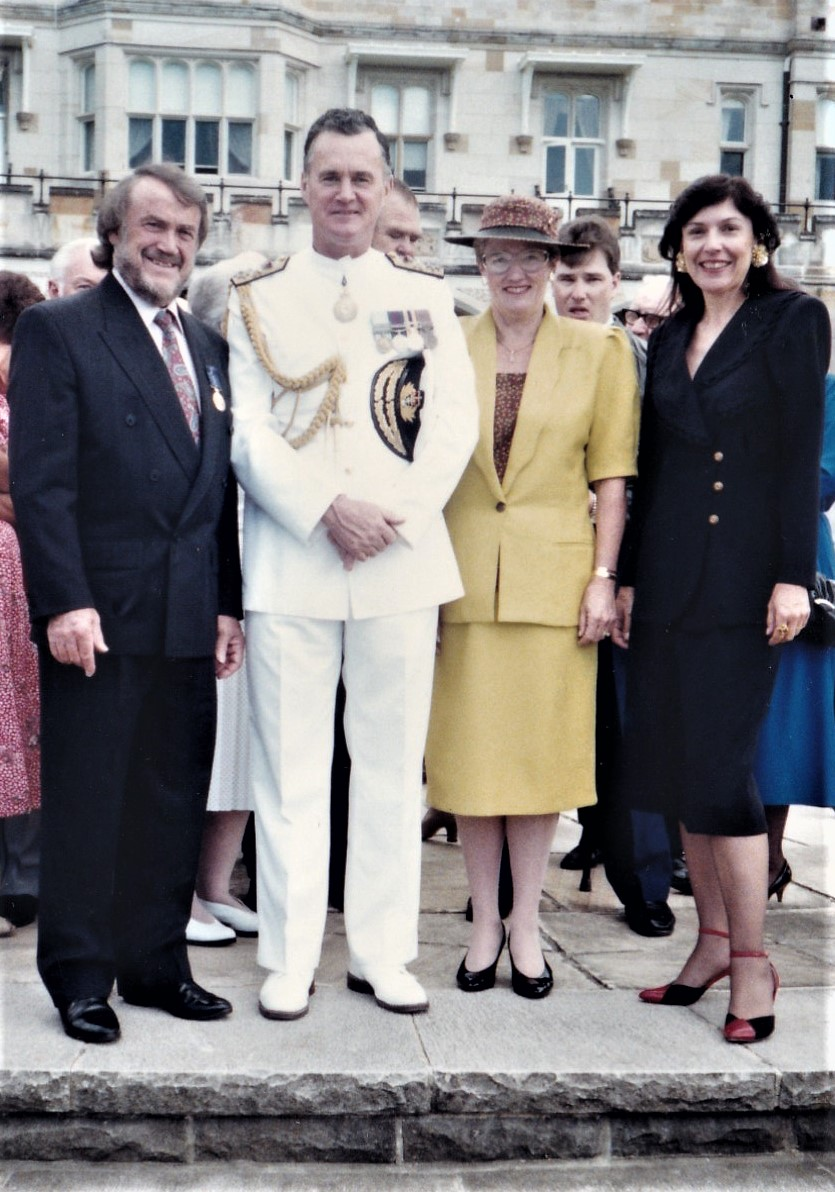
Johnny Ashcroft with his Medal of the Order of Australia (OAM), pictured alongside the New South Wales Governor and his wife, and Gay Kayler, his wife and long-time showbusiness partner.

In 1995, Ashcroft was appointed a Fellow of the Australian Institute of History and Arts (FAIHA) in recognition of his long-standing contributions to Australian performing arts. The citation noted his leadership in the field and stated that his work had significantly enriched the nation’s cultural archives, with lasting value for future generations.

=== Australian Roll of Renown ===
The Australasian Country Music Roll of Renown honours Australian and New Zealander musicians who have shaped the music industry by making a significant and lasting contribution to Country Music. It was inaugurated in 1976, and the inductee is announced at the Country Music Awards of Australia in Tamworth in January. Johnny Ashcroft's plaque states, ‘… The Johnny Ashcroft Show pioneered the breakthrough into the metropolitan registered club circuit. He was influential in establishing country music in this substantial market’.

Year	Nominee / work	Award	Result
1986	Johnny Ashcroft	Australian Roll of Renown	inductee

=== Mo Awards ===
The Australian Entertainment Mo Awards (known informally as the Mo Awards), were annual Australian entertainment industry awards. They recognised excellence in on-stage performance and achievements in live entertainment in Australia from 1975 to 2016. Johnny Ashcroft received the first Country Male Entertainer Mo Award in 1979.

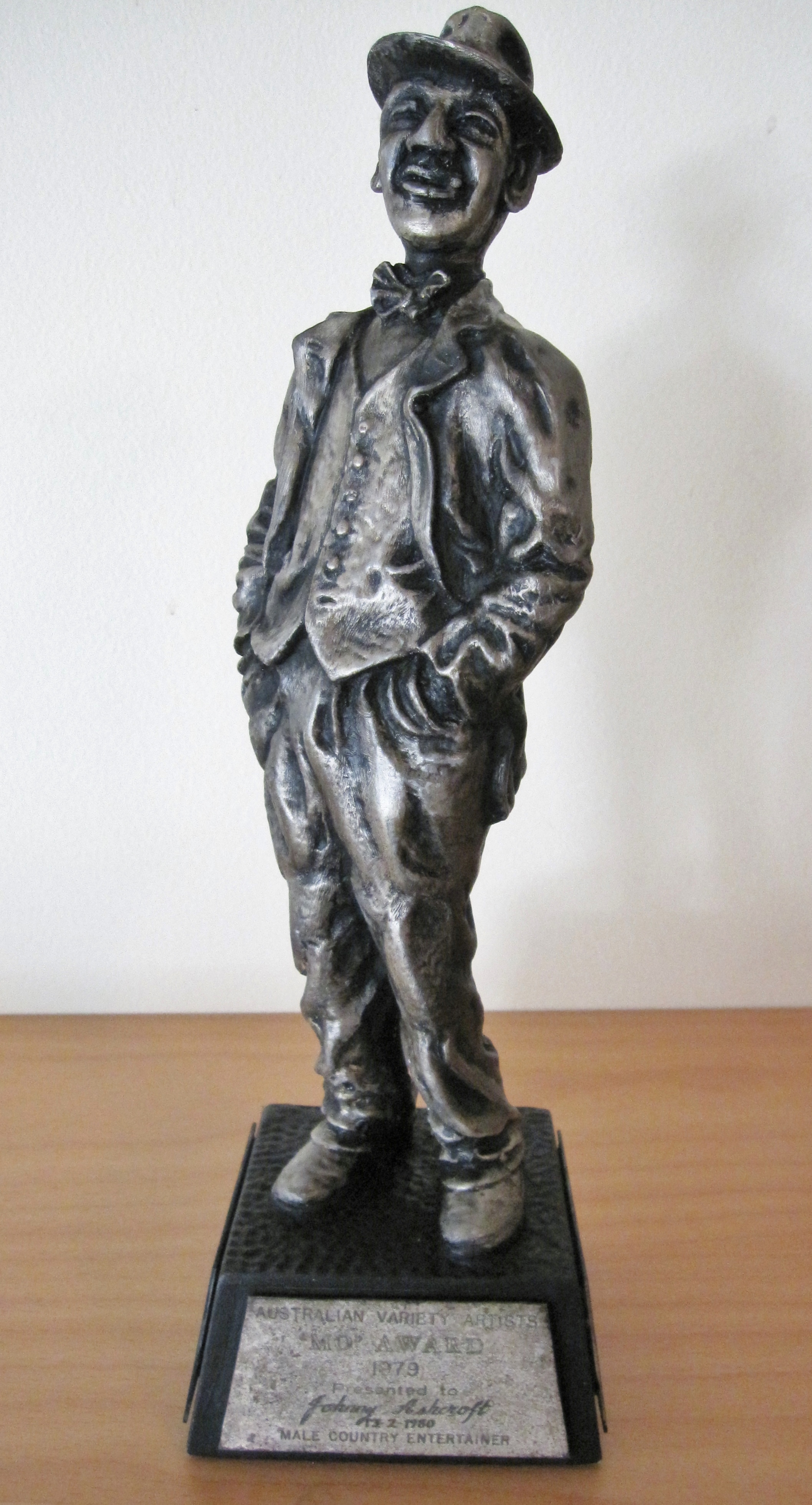
Johnny Ashcroft's 'Mo' Award for excellence in entertaining

Year	Nominee / work	Award	Result (wins only)
1979	Johnny Ashcroft	Country Male Entertainer of the Year	Won
