= Little Boy Lost (song) =

- Little Boy Lost - Gold LP (title track, first gold 45rpm in Australia and New Zealand)

Song by Johnny Ashcroft
- Released: 1960
- Genre: Country Rock
- Label: EMI Columbia
- Composer: Johnny Ashcroft

Little Boy Lost is an Australian single released by Johnny Ashcroft in early 1960. He composed the song from a lyric idea put forward by the disc jockey Tony Withers. It is based on the successful search for Steven Walls, a four-year-old boy from 'Tubbamurra', a farm near Guyra in the NSW New England Ranges.

== Historic event ==
The song accurately relates the saga of Australia's greatest land and air search. For four days and three nights, in February 1960, William Stanley, an Aboriginal tracker, five thousand other people and seven aircraft searched the rugged New England Ranges of New South Wales for four-year-old farm boy, Steven Walls, the Little Boy Lost. They found him alive and well.

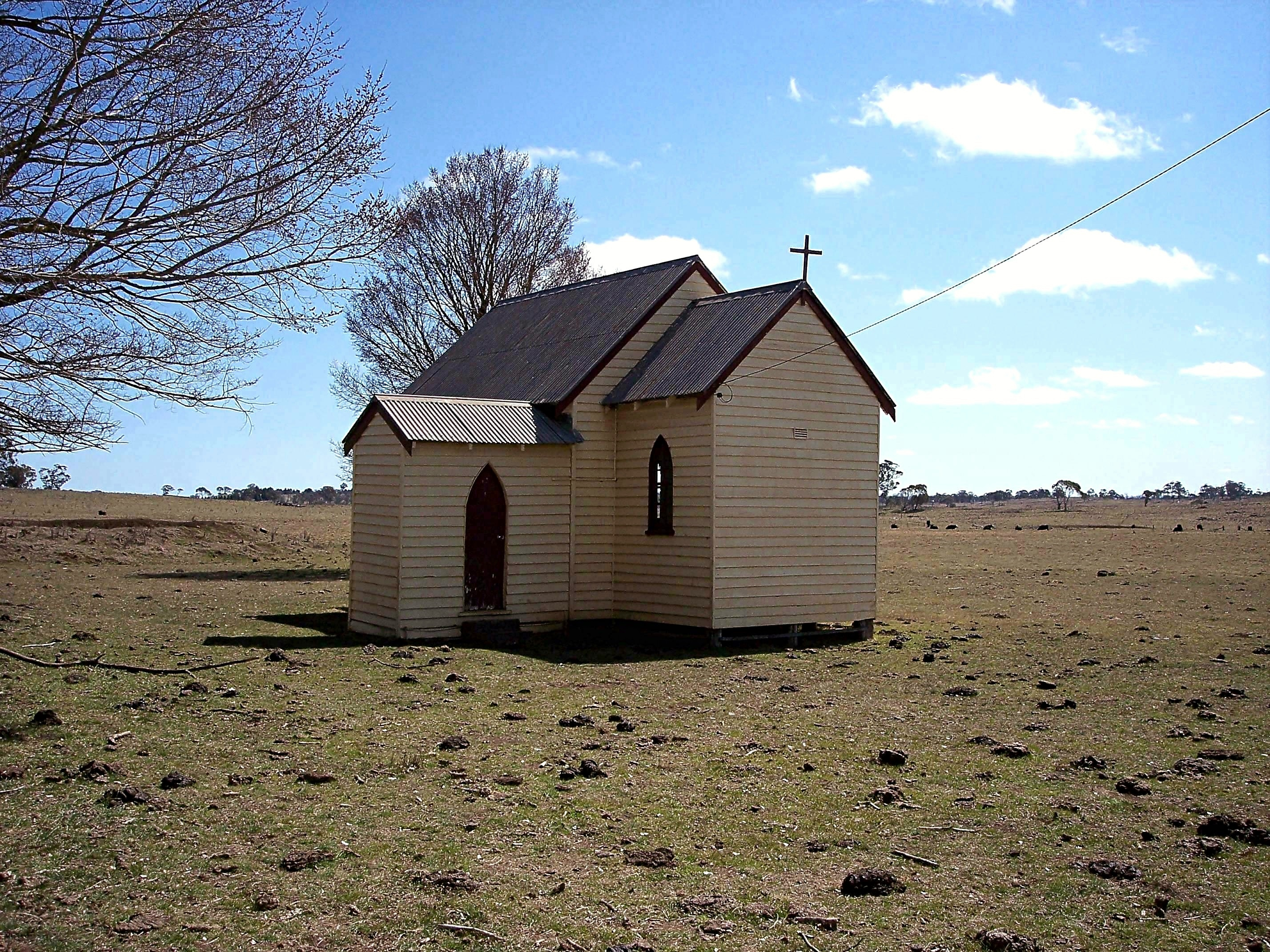
Abby Green church at Tubbamurra was the search headquarters for 5000 searchers, seven aircraft, 30 police and 80 soldiers.

== Hit record ==
Little Boy Lost was the top Australian hit song of 1960. In its day it became one of the country's all-time greatest hits, awarded the first 45rpm Gold Record struck in Australia. Johnny Ashcroft gifted this Gold Record to Steven Walls. Because he was on a lengthy tour in New Zealand, Ashcroft arranged for EMI to present it to Steven.

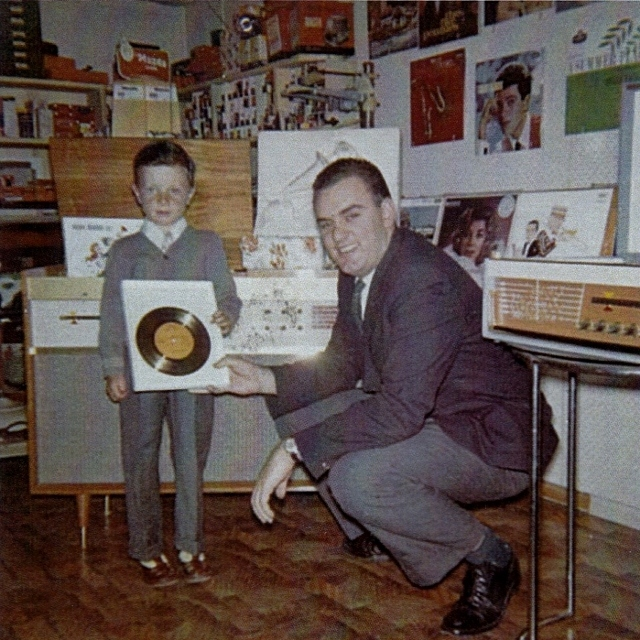
EMI presenting 4-year-old Steven Walls, the Little Boy Lost, with Australia's first 45rpm Gold Record

Little Boy Lost also became New Zealand's first Gold Record.

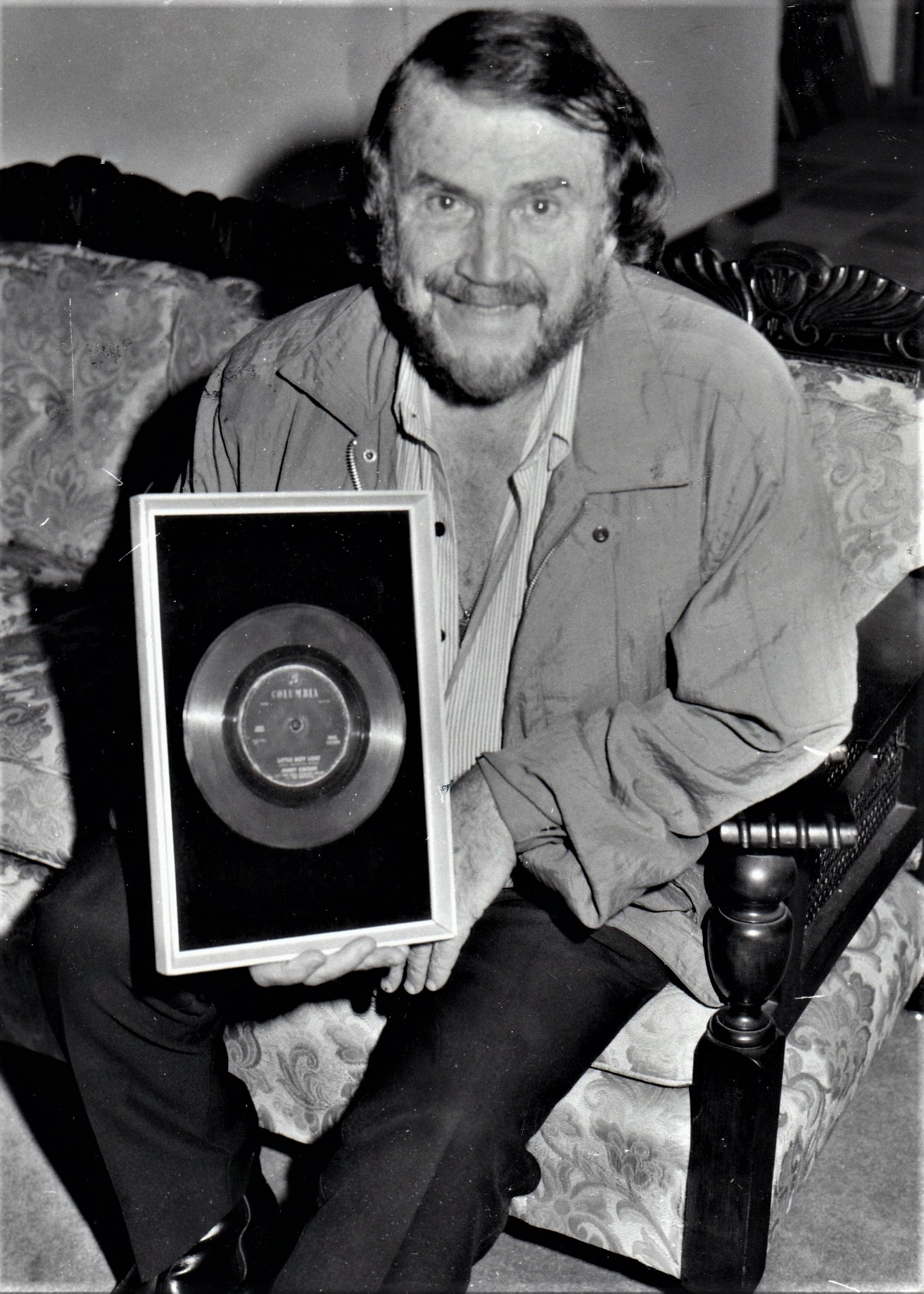
Johnny Ashcroft with Little Boy Lost, New Zealand's first Gold Record

Although the term had not yet been coined, Ashcroft's 1960 song, Little Boy Lost, was Australia's first country-rock song. However, it was arranged and recorded by jazzmen, including guitarist George Golla.

The Little Boy Lost LP, previously released as Mostly Folk, also went Gold after its name change.

The painting, Little Boy Lost by Sir Sidney Nolan, hangs in the Broken Hill Regional Art Gallery. Accession No. 1984.0001

== Worldwide success ==
A Johnny Ashcroft TV performance of Little Boy Lost was released worldwide on a film clip. That film clip was a forerunner of the video and DVD clips of today. Covers by notable artists were released, such as Jimmy Dean in the United States and Michael Holliday in the United Kingdom. Other notable Australian artists also recorded Little Boy Lost, among them Jimmy Little, Slim Dusty, the Singing Kettles and Evelyn Bury.

== A selfless act of compassion ==
In July 1960 some months after Steven Walls was found alive, and Little Boy Lost was still riding high on Top 40 charts, Sydney schoolboy Graeme Thorne became Australia's first kidnap victim; he was later found murdered. Purely because of connotations associated with the title, Little Boy Lost, Johnny Ashcroft had his song removed from Australian airplay to avoid the trauma of those three repetitive words being inflicted upon Thorne's family and friends. In doing so, he became the only songwriter or recording artist, at least in Australia, to deliberately stop the airplay of his own hit record.

== 1978 film ==
The Little Boy Lost movie had its world premiere in Armidale, New South Wales – in Australia's wild New England Ranges.

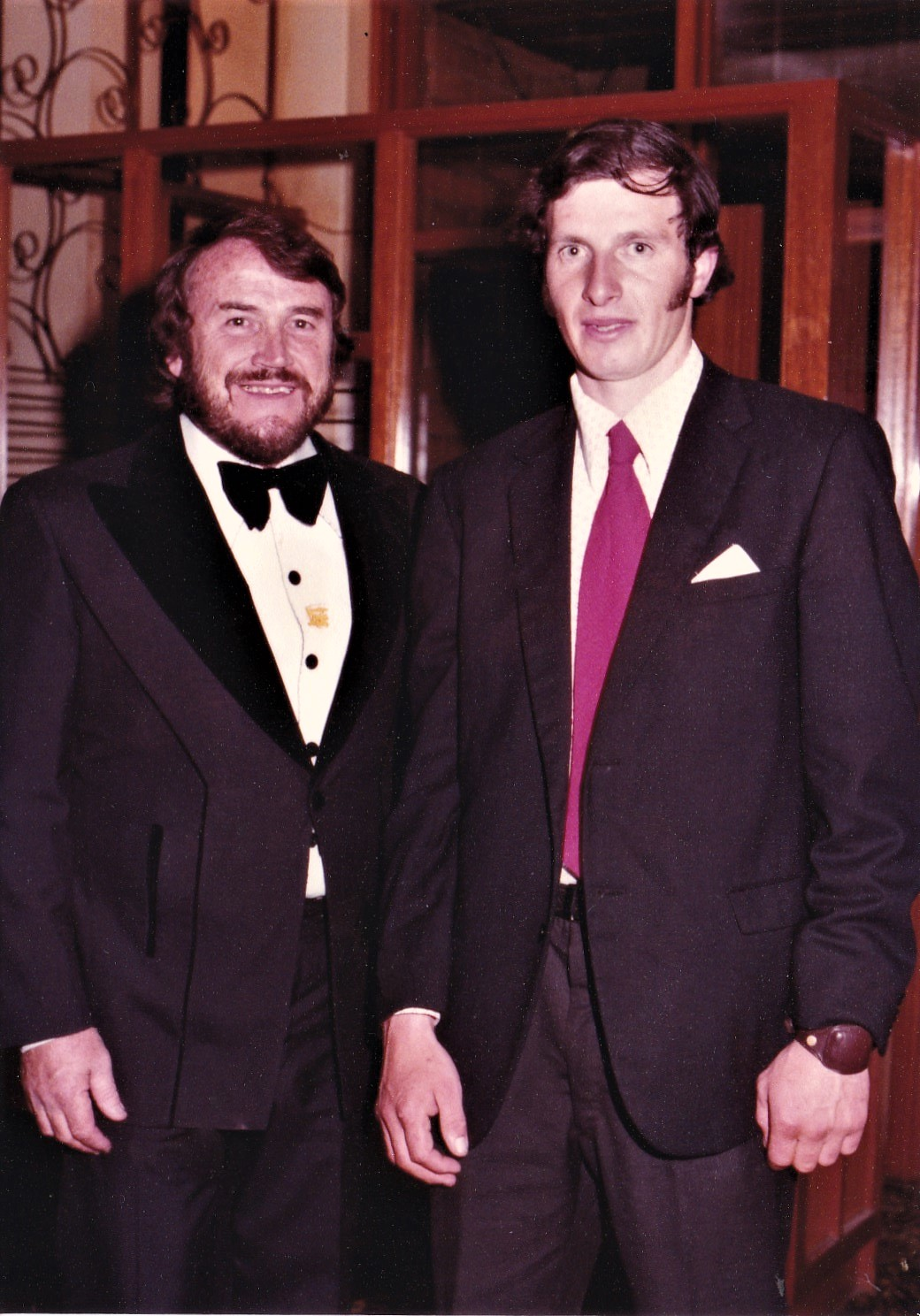
Johnny Ashcroft and Steven Walls, the Little Boy Lost, at the world premiere of the Little Boy Lost movie

Johnny Ashcroft and Gay Kayler recorded a new version of Little Boy Lost for the movie sound track, as well as some moving vocal sequences. Bob “Beetles” Young composed the movie theme, Terry Bourke was the director.

The Little Boy Lost book, based on the Terry Bourke screenplay, was published in time for the movie premiere.

The Little Boy Lost movie, which received the Catholic Award for Decency in Germany, starred Nathan Dawes as Steven Walls, Lorna Lesley and John Hargreaves as his parents, Tony Barry as Constable Jack O’Dea and Steve Dodd as William Stanley, the Aboriginal tracker.

The Little Boy Lost movie became available on video and DVD in 2005 and was re-released in 2007.

== Song re-release in 2007 ==
The original Johnny Ashcroft recording of Little Boy Lost has been available continuously, in various catalogues, since 1960. The hit version of the song was re-released on 4 August 2007 on a 28-track Rajon Music double CD set, Johnny Ashcroft, Here’s to You, Australia!.

== Legacy ==
Steven Walls died on his Guyra property in April 2020.

The Guyra Historical Museum's Steven Walls / Little Boy Lost display opened on 3 October 2020. The centre-piece is the Gold Record of Little Boy Lost that Johnny Ashcroft gifted to the four-year-old boy sixty-four years earlier.

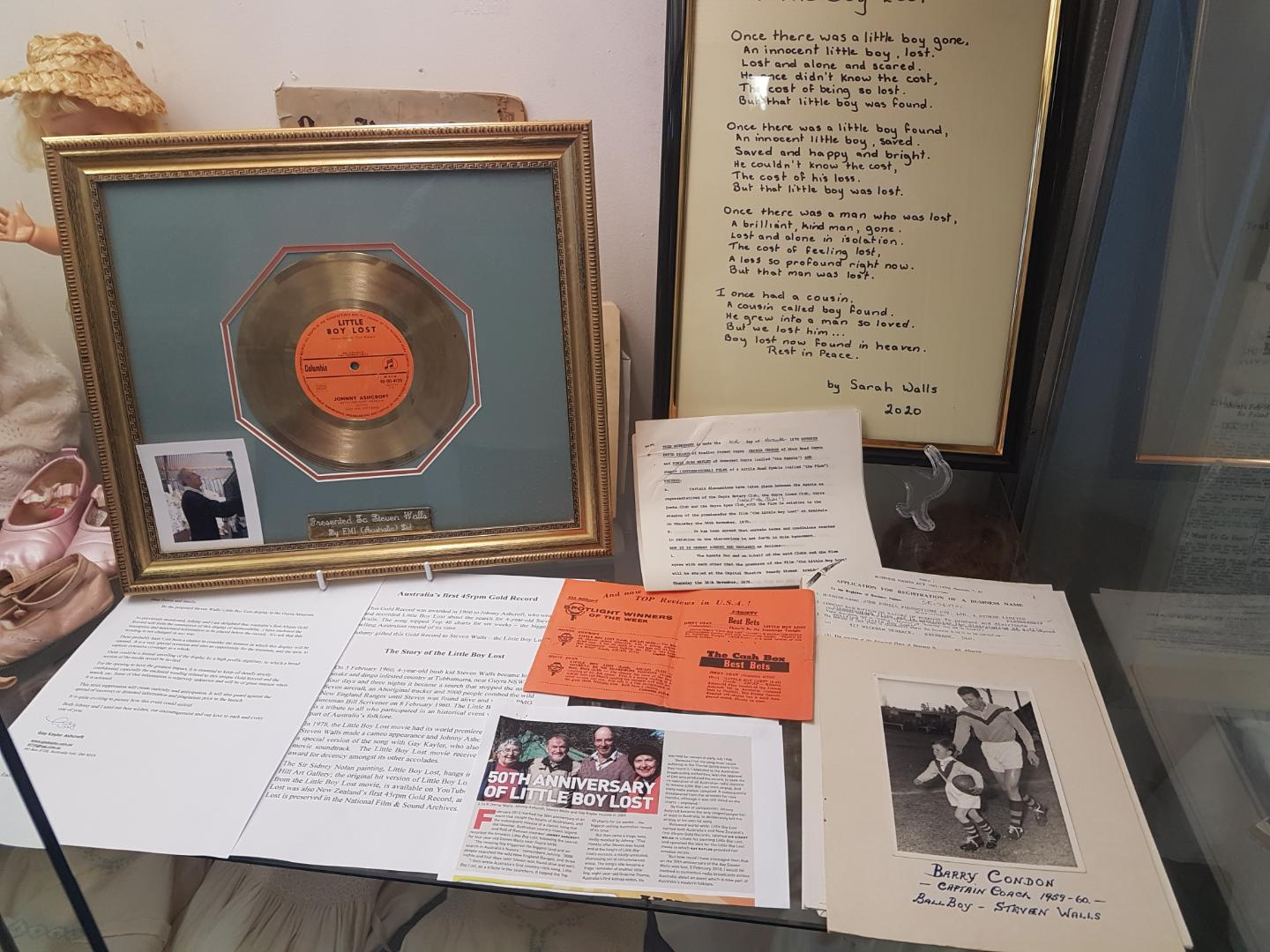
The Little Boy Lost Gold Record in the Steven Walls-Little Boy Lost display in the Guyra Museum.

The Johnny Ashcroft and Gay Kayler Legacy Collection was presented to the Australian Country Music Hall of Fame in Tamworth (Gamilaraay Country) on 28 May 2022, with a Welcome to Country and Smoking Ceremony.

The segment, Little Boy Lost, the Search, Song, Movie and Beyond, with one hundred and three items in its catalogue, was part of this impressive Collection. Tamworth Regional Council news report

Steven's mother, Dorrie (Dorothy) Walls, two of his brothers, four nieces plus friends and workmates drove from Guyra to take part in this moving ceremony.
