= Little Boy (The Crystals song) =

1963 song by The Crystals

"Little Boy" is a 1963 song by the Crystals written by Ellie Greenwich and Jeff Barry and produced by Phil Spector. The song reached #92 on the US chart.

In its contemporary review, Cash Box said that "the overwhelming 'Phil Spector-instrumental sound' is much in evidence as the gals devote this one to their 'crush.'"
