= Gay Kayler =

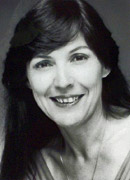

Background information
- Born: 27 September 1941 (age 85); Australia
- Genre: Country music
- Occupations: Singer; Musician; Television personality; Recording artist; Model; Scriptwriter; Educator
- Labels: RCA, Columbia, EMI, Axis, Selection, Jade, Rajon, Reader's Digest

Gay Kayler (born 27 September 1941) is an Australian country music entertainer - a vocalist, television personality, recording artist, pianist, triple beauty quest title holder, model, scriptwriter and educator. Gay used her maiden name in her professional career until 1978, when she changed the spelling from Kahler to Kayler to maintain a consistency of pronunciation. She retired in 1998.

== Early life ==
Gay Kayler comes from a musical family. Her mother sang and played piano, piano accordion and violin with her siblings in their father's dance band on the Darling Downs, Queensland, in the 1930s.

In 1942, the Kayler family moved to Sydney, where Gay continued this musical tradition when, at the age of two-and-a-half, she captivated commuters on Sydney's trams and buses as she sang for them.

In the early 1950s, Gay sang on one of the first reel-to-reel tape recorders in Australia – as part of its demonstration at the Sydney Royal Easter Show.

After attaining her certificate for 7th Grade Piano, Theory and Musical Perception, Gay and her family moved to Toowoomba, Queensland. It was there that Gay made her first professional performance in 1958.

Gay Kayler's reputation blossomed when she was chosen to sing the Alexandra Waltz for Princess Alexandra during her 1959 visit to Australia. The Fairy Princess wanted to hear more so, by royal command, the teenager sang a selection of songs. Ultimately, this led to Gay being contracted to Brisbane's Channel 7 for 3 years, where she appeared in shows such as the multi-Logie-Award-winning Theatre Royal with George Wallace Jnr.

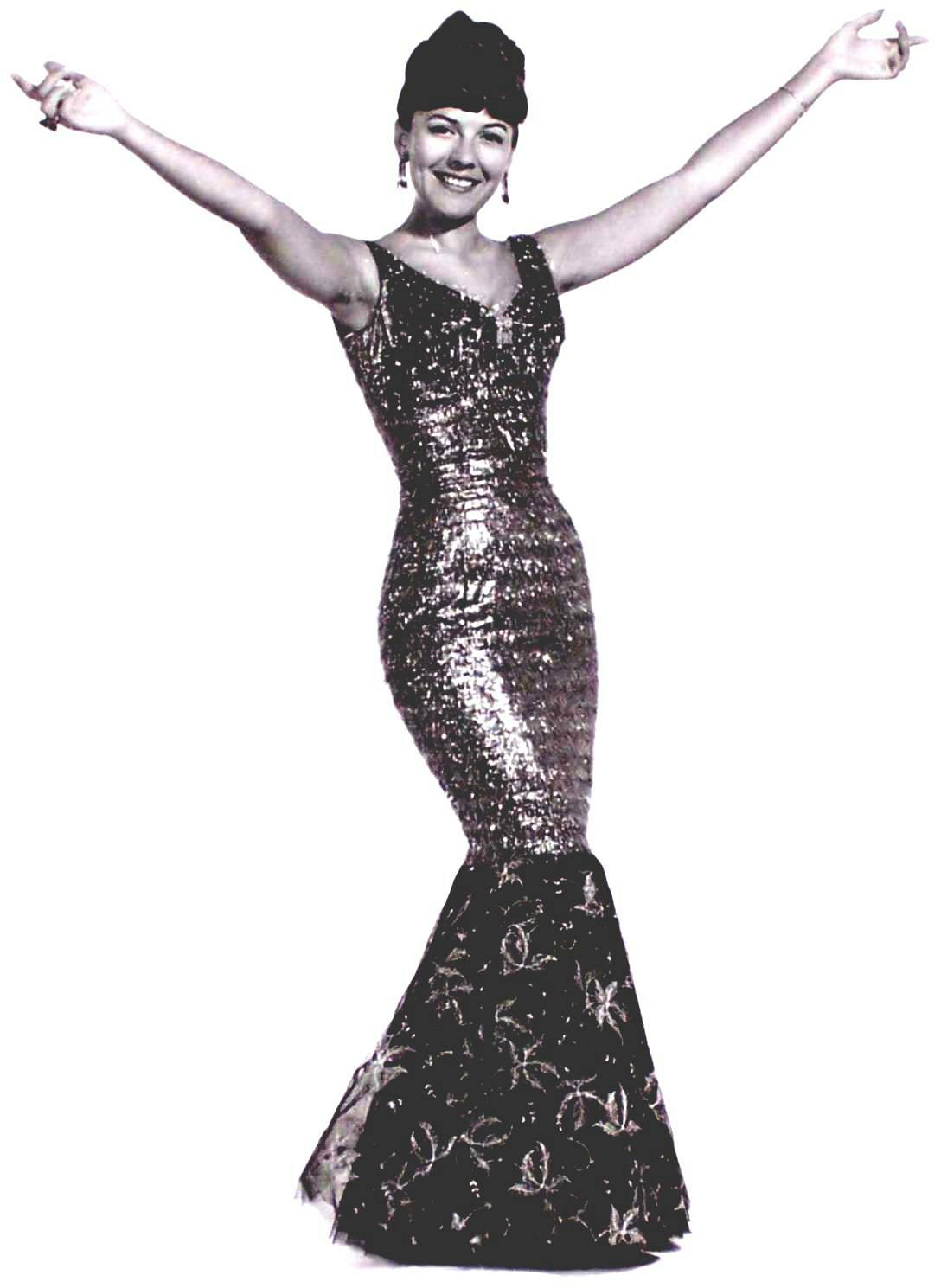
Gay Kayler as the entertainer

== Television and live performances ==
Gay's 40-year professional showbusiness career included appearances on most national TV shows, e.g. Brian Henderson's Bandstand, Johnny O'Keefe's Sing, Sing, Sing and Graeme Bell's Trad Jazz. She performed eight times in the main Concert Hall of the Sydney Opera House, including on the first all-Australian Country Music Concert and the first all-Australian Variety Show held in that iconic venue. Gay also featured her Salvation Army Red Shield Appeal Song, Captain Joe Henry's Happy Hand-Clapping, Open Air Rhythm Band, backed by Geoff Harvey's Orchestra, the Salvation Army Brass Ensemble and Timbrels, and the 300-voice Massed Songster Brigade, when she opened and closed a 1976 concert in that venue.

Other notable venues included Melbourne's Sidney Myer Music Bowl, Adelaide's Chrysler Auditorium and the 1,500 strong NSW Registered Club Circuit, said to be the biggest entertainment circuit in the world in its day.

== Modelling, commercials and movie sound track ==
Gay Kayler, a triple beauty quest title holder, was a singer and model who also made commercials, e.g., with Bert Newton on Australia's Great Barrier Reef and the female voices on the radio commercial, David Callan at Your Club, which was aired over 31,000 times.

As the 1960 Miss Darling Downs and a Miss Australia Quest State Finalist Australian Country Music Hall of Fame Gay received training on social skills, personal style and etiquette from June Dally-Watkins OAM, one of the 100 Australian Legends, a National Treasure, and Australia's go-to expert on correct behaviour June Marie Dally-Watkins 1927-2020. This included deportment and posture, how to sit elegantly, how to set a table and dining etiquette.

Gay recorded the female sound track on the 1978 Little Boy Lost movie, which was released worldwide.

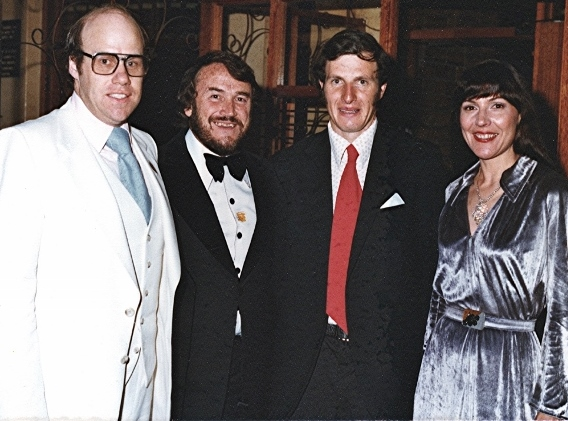
Nick Erby, Johnny Ashcroft, Steven Walls, Gay Kayler at movie premiere

Terry Bourke, the movie's director, presented an autographed copy of Little Boy Lost, a book based on his screenplay, to Gay Kayler at the movie premiere.

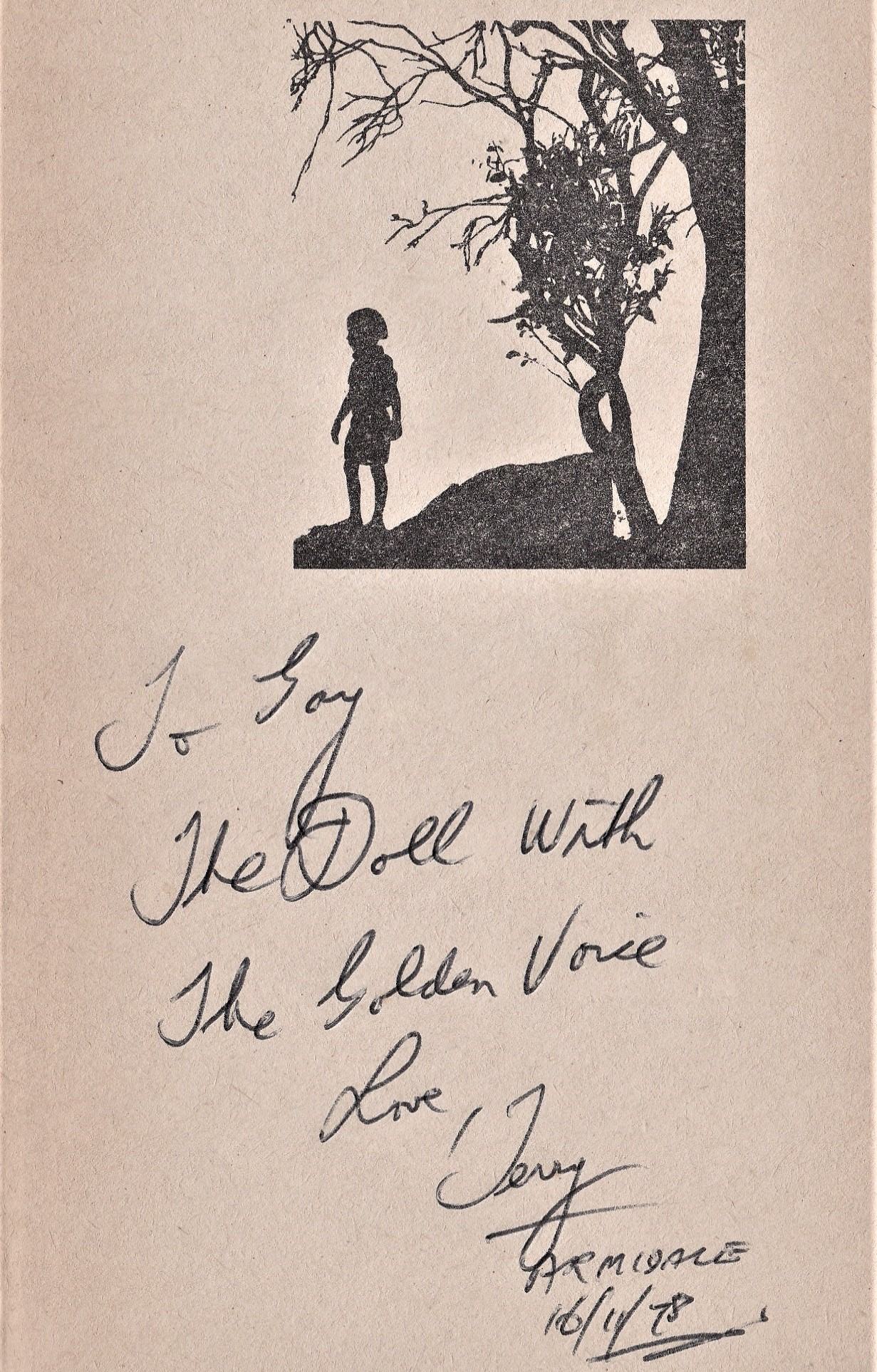
Autograph inside the Little Boy Lost book presented to Gay Kayler at the Little Boy Lost movie world premiere.

The Little Boy Lost DVD was released in 2005 and again in 2007.

== Charitable work ==
Gay's charitable work included volunteering for Meals on Wheels, organising numerous fund-raising events, and judging competitions from the most Beautiful Baby and Ugly Man to a Water Ski Past, Snow Queen, Princess of Youth, Queen of Debutantes, Cinderella and Prince Charming, Miss Personality, Best Dressed Cowgirl and Cowboy, and more. She was also the inaugural president of the Toowoomba Bachelor Girls Service Club.

== Recordings ==
Gay Kayler's recording career began in 1973 when she recorded the EMI album, Faces of Love, with Johnny Ashcroft. She had a double charting single in 1975 of "Nobody's Child" coupled with the first Australian female trucking song, "My Home-Coming Trucker's Coming Home", composed by Ashcroft. She was chosen to record Ruth Cotton's Dream Away My Life, an RCA/2KY Country Songwriter prize-winner. Her last recording in 1995 was "Child of Koonapippi", a song of the Aboriginal Stolen Generations, written by Eric Watson (re-released 2001).

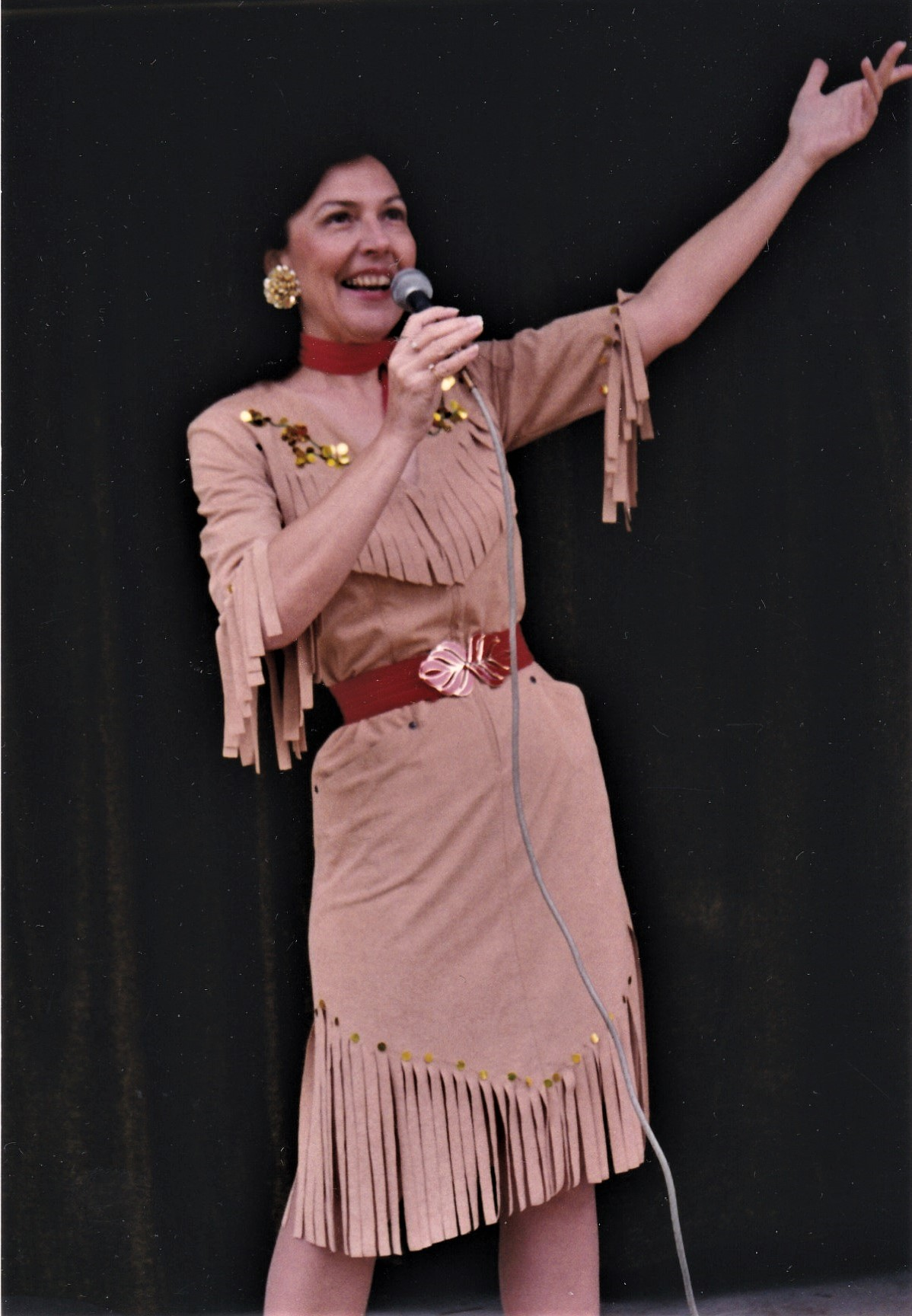
Gay Kayler in a country music production

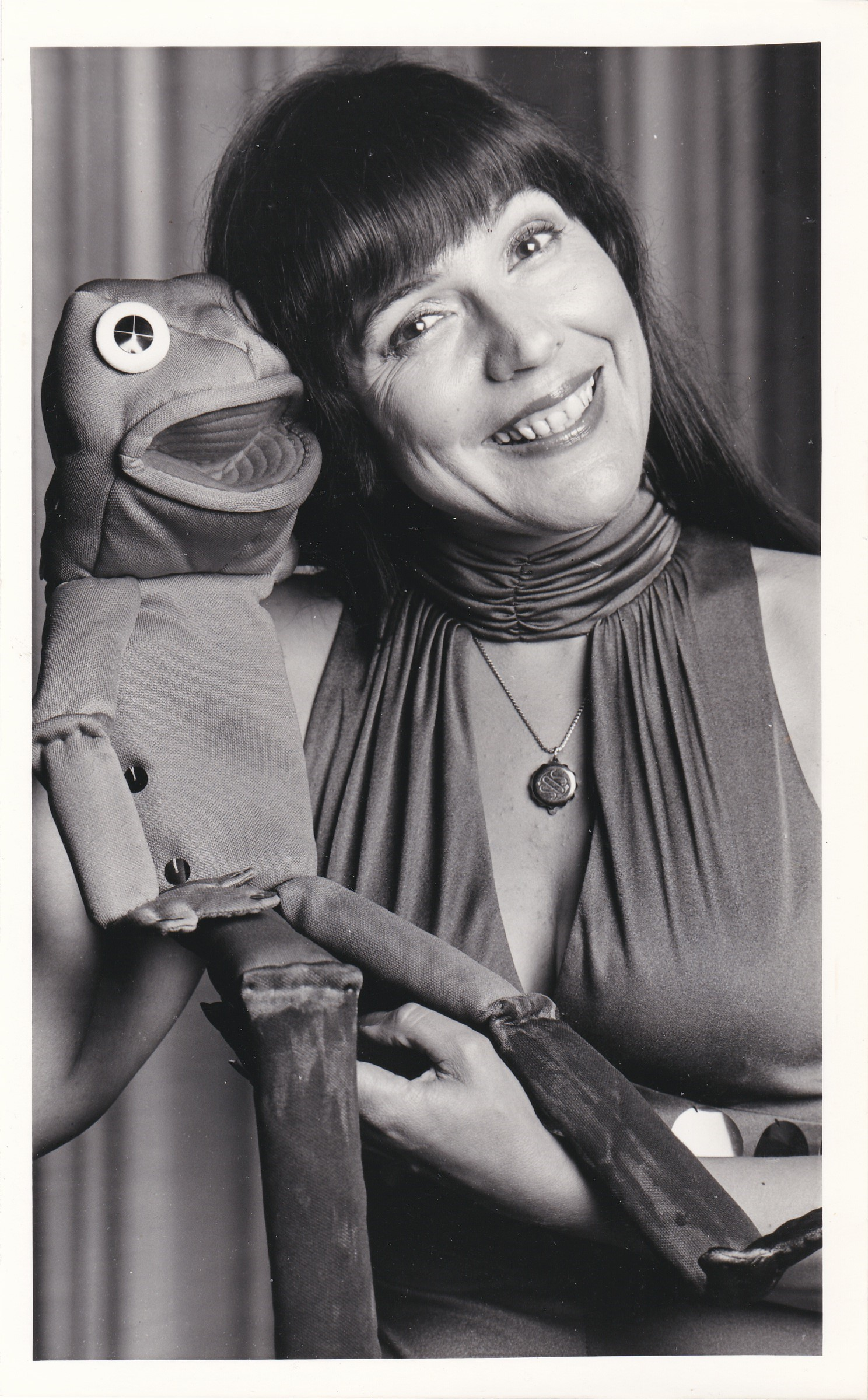
Gay Kayler with hand puppet by Betty Viazim MBE

Gay is best known for her version of The White Magnolia Tree, which was in EMI and Reader's Digest catalogues for over 33 years; also for her work on the heritage LP, The Cross of the Five Silver Stars – in particular for Matthew, a song of the great navigator, Matthew Flinders. This album was a finalist for the Heritage Award in the Australasian Country Music Awards. It was re-released as part of the 2007 Rajon Music Australian historical double CD set, Johnny Ashcroft, Here's To You, Australia! It also features Bettybo and musical director, Shep Davis.

=== Albums ===
Title	Details
Face of Love (solo and duets with Johnny Ashcroft)	Released: 1973; Label: Columbia (SOEX-10089)
KY Country 2KY 50 Years (Featuring Dream Away My Life, an RCA/2KY Country Music Songwriter prize winner)	Released: 1975; Label: RCA (VCL1-0101)
People, Places And Gertrude (Featuring Johnny Ashcroft's true-story composition, A Song For Danny with Gay Kayler)	Released: 1975; Label: RCA (SP 164)
Big Truck Hits (Featuring My Home-coming Trucker's Coming Home, Australia's first female trucking song)	Released:1976; Label: RCA (VAL1-0123)
Johnny Ashcroft in Little Boy Lost Country (Featuring Street Singer duet with Johnny Ashcroft, also Just Another Long Lost Love and Little Boy Lost movie version, Johnny Ashcroft with Gay Kayler)	Released: 1978; Label: RCA (VPK1 0173)
Country Cream (Featuring Rodeo Queen, Rocking Alone in Her Old Rocking Chair, and On the Inside duet with Johnny Ashcroft)	Released: 1979; Label: Selection (PRML 011)
Johnny Ashcroft Streetsinger (Featuring Street Singer duet with Johnny Ashcroft, and Little Boy Lost movie version with Gay Kayler)	Released: 1981; Label: RCA (DPL 609)
A Time For Change (Featuring Imagine That! duet with Johnny Ashcroft, also Connection Man and Life Is Just A Bowl of Berry's by the Baron and Lady Finflingkington (Johnny's and Gay's alter egos)	Released: 1981; Label: RCA (VAL1 0354)
A Tribute To Buddy Williams (Featuring Buddy Williams with Johnny Ashcroft and Gay Kayler)	Released: 1985; Label: Axis (AX.701410)
The Cross of the Five Silver Stars Johnny Ashcroft, Gay Kayler, Bettybo and Shep Davis, a Heritage Award finalist	Released: 1989; Label: Jade Records (JADLP1009)
Popular Music of the 50s Vol 2 (Featuring The White Magnolia Tree. Gay Kayler is the only Australian artist on this 100-track, four CD set)	Released: 1989; Label: EMI (7918072)
Sharing (Featuring Child of Koonapippi, about a child of Australia's Stolen Generations and The Fields of Athenry duet with Johnny Ashcroft)	Released: 1995; Label: Selection (PCD 082)
Let Us Sing Another Good Old Country Song (Featuring Child of Koonapippi, a song of Australia's Stolen Generations)	Released: 2001; Label: Selection (PCD 716)
Johnny Ashcroft, Here's To You, Australia! (A 28-song, double CD set, with Johnny Ashcroft, Gay Kayler, Bettybo and Shep Davis)	Released: 2007; Label: Rajon (CDR1066)

==== Singles ====
Title and details	Title and details	
Nobody's Child (Vocal backing by the Bankstown Police Citizens Boys' Club Choir)	My Home-coming Trucker's Coming Home (Australia's first female trucking song. Written, arranged and produced by Johnny Ashcroft)	Released: 1975; Label: RCA (102662)
A Song For Danny Johnny Ashcroft with Gay Kayler (A true story, written by Johnny Ashcroft)	Holy Joe, The Salvo Johnny Ashcroft	Released: 1976; Label: RCA (102622)
Captain Joe Henry's Happy Hand-clapping Open Air Rhythm Band (The 1976 Salvation Army Red Shield Appeal Song)	Jesus Who (Vocal backing by the Salvation Army's Hurstville Life Band, an Australian first)	Released: 1976; Label: RCA (102789)
Little Boy Lost movie version with Gay Kayler	Happy Sad Johnny Ashcroft	Released: 1978; Label: RCA (103230)
Street Singer Johnny Ashcroft and Gay Kayler (duet)	Just Another Long Lost Love Johnny Ashcroft with Gay Kayler	Released: 1981; Label: RCA (103300)
Imagine That! Gay Kayler and Johnny Ashcroft (duet) (From A Time For Change Album)	Rock and Roll Me Johnny Ashcroft	Released: 1981; Label: RCA (103758)
Australian Freedom From Hunger Campaign	The Garden Gay Kayler and Johnny Ashcroft in massed voices of 56 top Australian artists as Australia Too	Released: 1985; Label: EMI (ED.132)

== Production shows ==
Gay Kayler combined a major part of her career with Australian country music star, Johnny Ashcroft, whom she married in 1981.

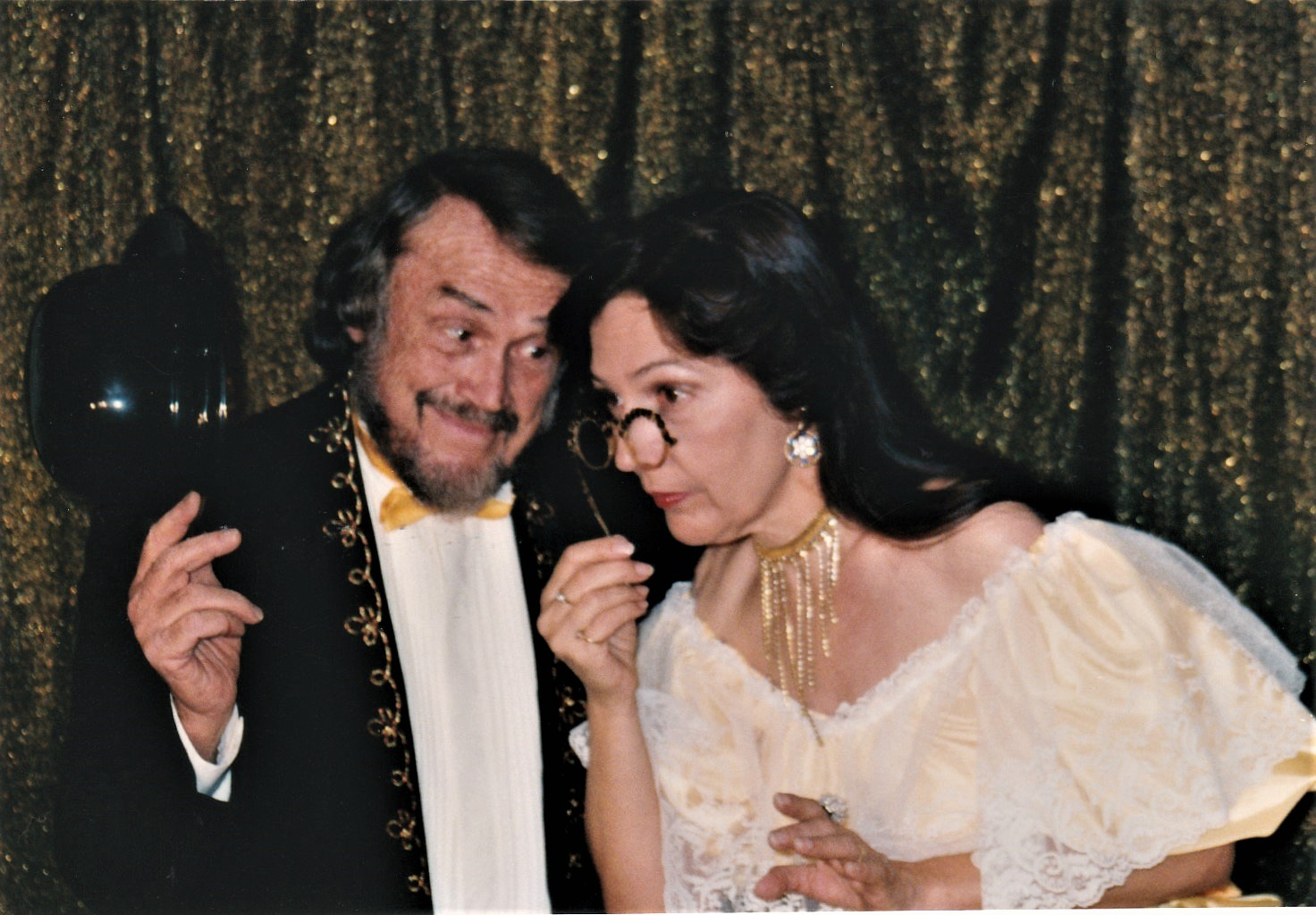
Johnny Ashcroft and Gay Kayler in a comedy routine

Although they created a reputation as a show-stopping duo, they still retained their individuality by incorporating solo highlights within their performances.

Their production shows, such as The Imagine That! Australiana Show, Here's To You, Australia!, The Goodtime Gotcha Show and Everything But The Drover's Dog, often included comedy segments with Gay and Johnny as themselves, and also as their alter egos, The Baron and Lady Finflingkington (The Baron's consort), who sang disco.

Parallel with their adult production shows, Gay Kayler and Johnny Ashcroft spent eleven years presenting Australian history to more than 750,000 school children with songs, stories and visuals in their NSW Education Department accredited shows.

In 2004, Gay and Johnny were adopted into the Gamilaraay Nation by Gamilaraay elder, Centennial Medal holder and United Nations keynote speaker, Barbara Flick, because of their 'ground-breaking' presentations of Australia's First Nations people, both traditional and present day, and for their stance against racism.

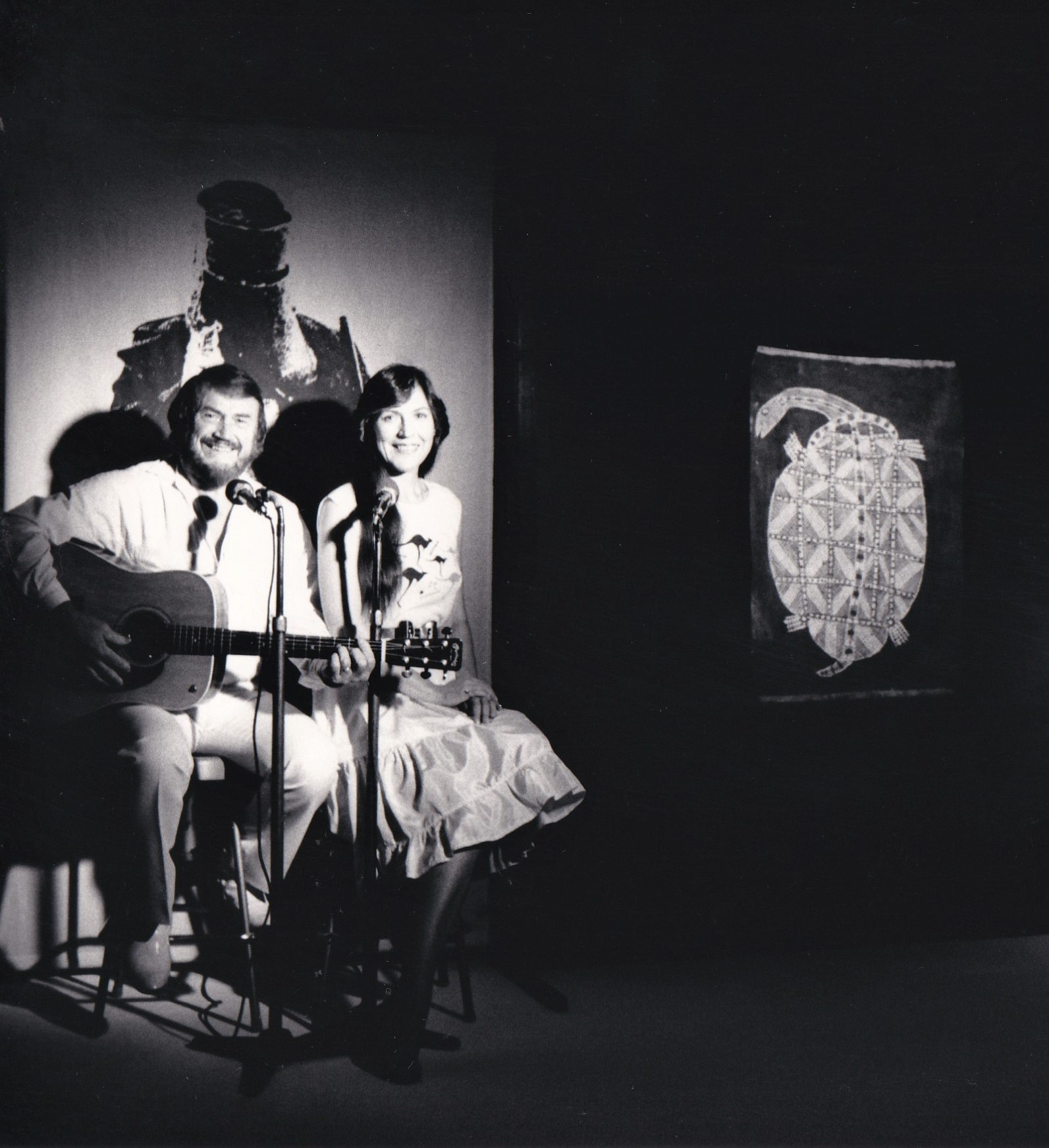
Johnny Ashcroft & Gay Kayler in their Australiana show

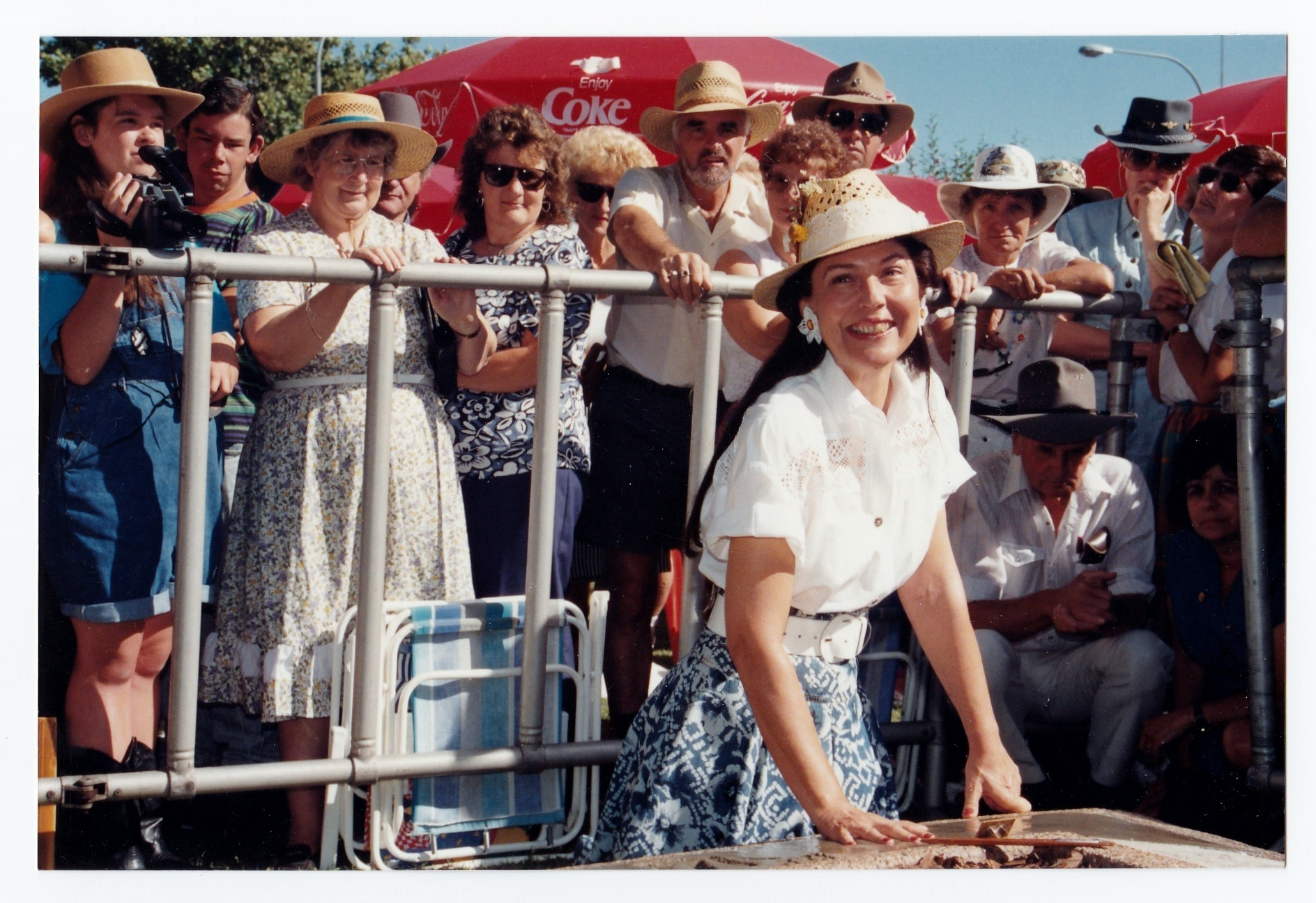
Gay Kayler in the Australian Country Music Hands of Fame

== Special Recognition ==
In 1981, Gay Kayler received the Queensland Country Music Awards national trophy for Service to Australia's Country Music Industry.

Gay Kayler was imprinted in the Australian Country Music Hands of Fame in 1994.

== Legacy ==
The Johnny Ashcroft and Gay Kayler Legacy Collection was presented to the Australian Country Music Hall of Fame in Tamworth (Gamilaraay Country) on 28 May 2022, with a Welcome to Country and Smoking Ceremony.

Nine Hundred and seventy-seven items, plus seventy-nine recordings, a variety of posters and eighteen recorded backgrounds joined artifacts already in the Museum. The collection included Little Boy Lost, the Search, Song, Movie and Beyond (one hundred and three items). Tamworth Regional Council news article

== Credits and awards ==
(Chronological):

- Royal Command Performance for Princess Alexandra, the Queen's cousin
- Miss Australia Quest's Miss Darling Downs
- Sunday Mail's Kirra Sun Girl
- RSL Western Districts Girl in a Million
- Inaugural President of the Toowoomba Bachelor Girls' Service Club
- Salvation Army Red Shield Appeal Song (Captain Joe Henry's Happy Hand-Clapping Open Air Rhythm Band)
- Inaugural Secretary of the Professional Country Music Association of Australia (PCMAA)
- Finalist in Best Female category (Australasian Country Music Awards)
- Finalist in Best Duo – with Johnny Ashcroft (Australasian Country Music Awards)
- National Award for Service to Australia's Country Music Industry (Queensland Country Music Awards)
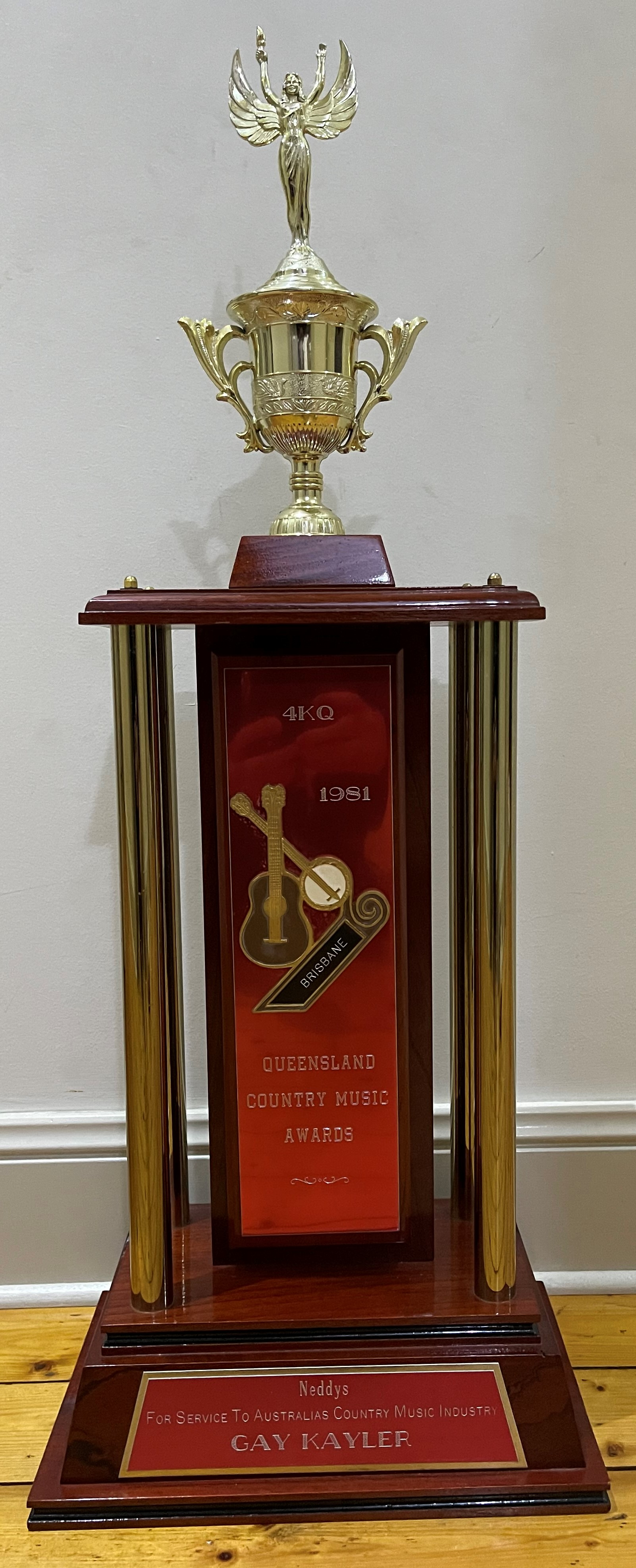
  Gay Kayler's trophy for 'Service to Australia's Country Music Industry'
- Finalist for the Heritage Award with The Cross of the Five Silver Stars (Australasian Country Music Awards)
- Multiple nominee in the Australian Variety Artists Mo Awards
- Imprinted in the Australasian Country Music Hands of Fame–Tamworth, New South Wales
