= Big Boy (nickname) =

Big Boy is the nickname of:

- Arthur Crudup (1905–1976), American singer and guitarist
- Big Boy Goudie (1899–1966), American jazz musician
- Alberto Reynoso (1940–2011), Filipino basketball player
- Malcolm Sebastian (1923–2006), American comedian
- Arthur "Big Boy" Spires (1912–1990), American blues singer and guitarist
- Carlisle Towery (1920–2012), National Basketball Association and League player
- Guinn "Big Boy" Williams (1899–1962), American actor
- Big Boy (radio host), American DJ, radio host and actor
