= Little Boy Lost (sculpture) =

Coordinates: 33.9003°S 151.2705°E

Little Boy Lost, situated on Tamarama Beach, October 2009

Little Boy Lost is a sculpture created by the Australian artist Paul Trefry for the "Sculpture by the Sea" exhibition on Bondi and Tamarama beach, in 2009. It is an over–sized silicone rubber and fiberglass sculpture made to resemble a toddler of approximately 18 months to 2 years of age, and for the duration of the exhibition, it was situated on Tamarama Beach, to the South of Bondi.
