= Little Boy Lost (1978 film) =

- Directed by: Terry Bourke
- Written by: Terry Bourke; George Seaton
- Produced by: Phillip Avalon; Alan Spires
- Starring: Brian Anderson; Tony Barry; Don Crosby; Nathan Dawes
- Music by: Bob Young
- Distributed by: Filmways Australian
- Release date: 16 November 1978
- Running time: 90 minutes
- Country: Australia
- Language: English
- Budget: $395,000

Little Boy Lost is a 1978 Australian drama film starring Nathan Dawes as Stephen Walls, John Hargreaves as Jacko Walls, Lorna Lesley as Dorrie Walls, Tony Barry as Constable O'Dea and Steve Dodd as William Stanley, the Aboriginal tracker. The spelling of Steven Walls’s name was changed to “Stephen” in the movie.

Johnny Ashcroft and Gay Kayler performed the vocals on the movie sound track, also a specially recorded version of the Little Boy Lost hit song, which is played at the end of the film.

Scenes were shot on location in Guyra, Tubbamurra and Narrabeen, New South Wales, Australia.

The World Premiere was held in Armidale, New South Wales.

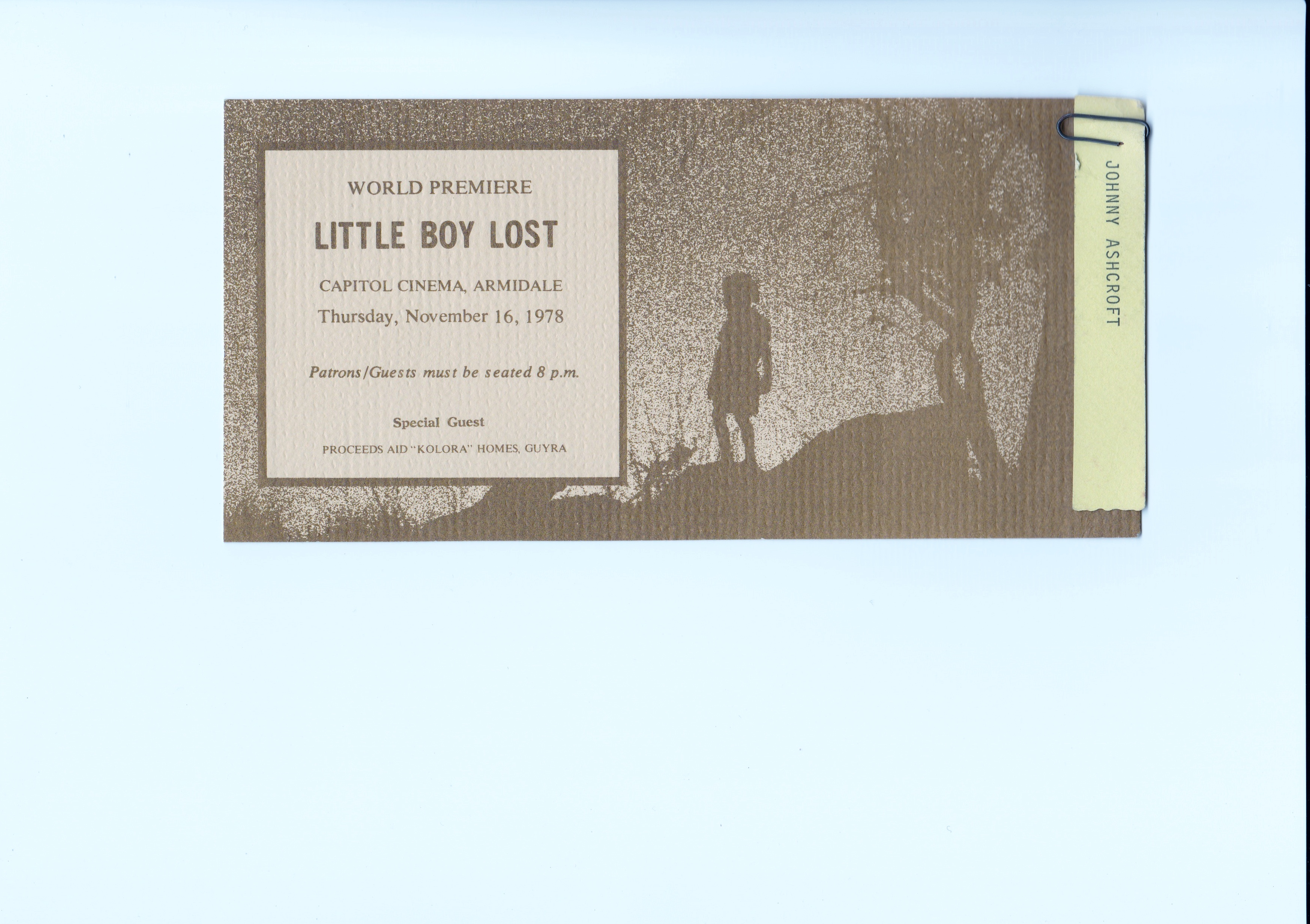
Ticket to Little Boy Lost movie world premiere 16-11-1978

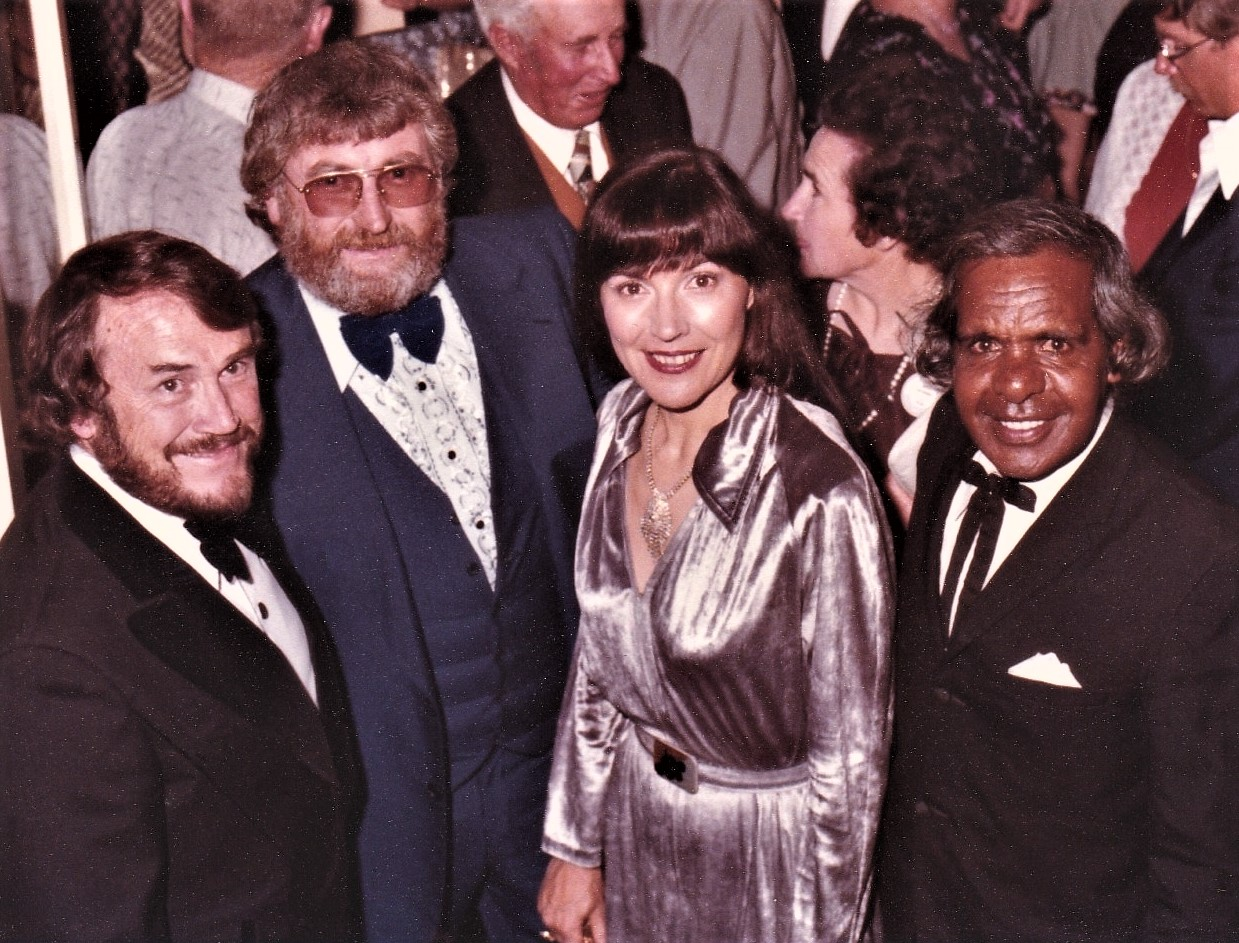
Johnny Ashcroft, Col Atcheson, Gay Kayler, Steve Dodd, the tracker in the movie

Johnny Ashcroft and Gay Kayler sang the Little Boy Lost song from the movie live on stage to Nathan Dawes and his stand-in, Toshi Bourke, son of Terry Bourke (movie director).

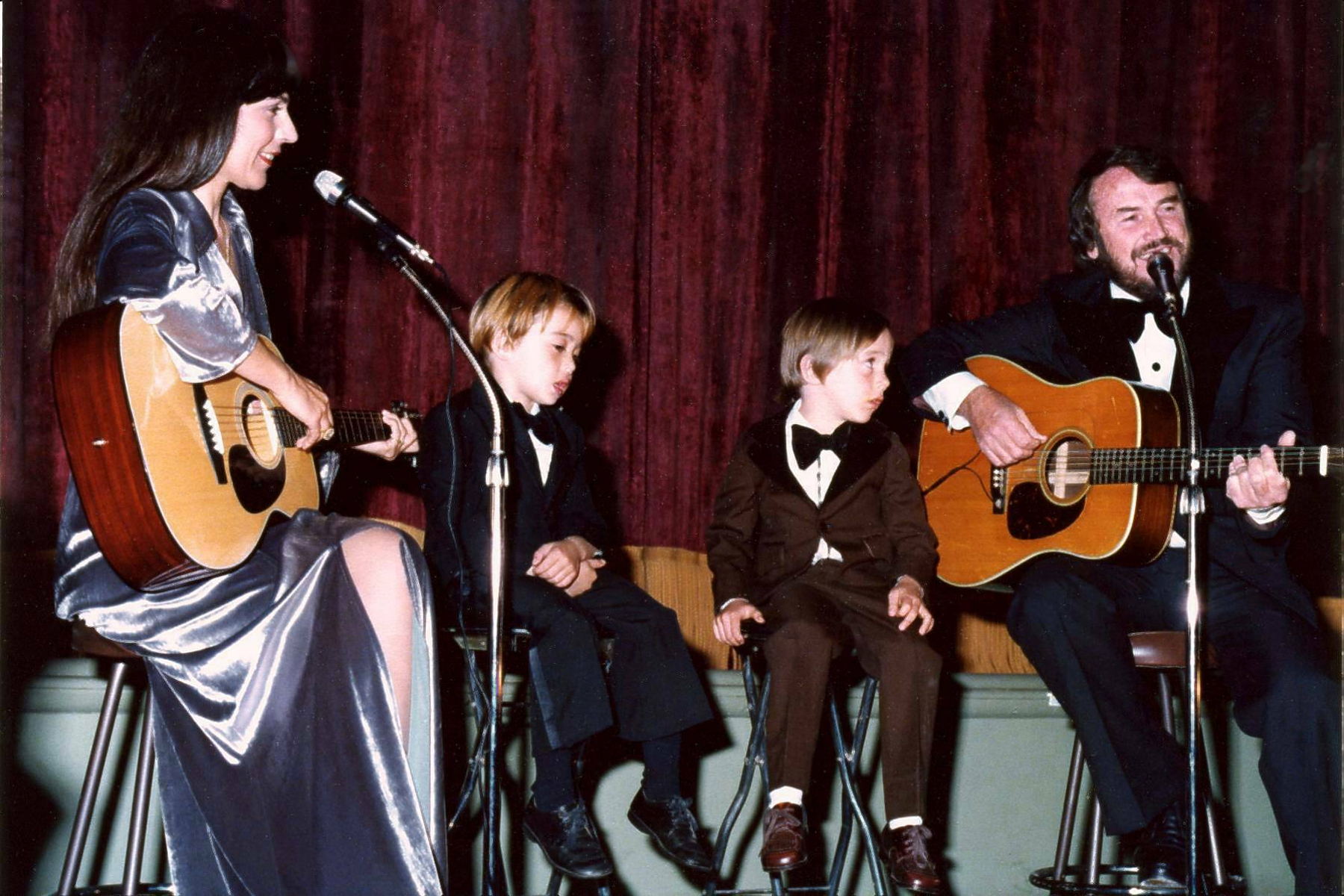
Gay Kayler, Toshi Bourke, Nathan Dawes, Johnny Ashcroft, world premiere of Little Boy Lost movie

== Cast ==
- Nathan Dawes as Stephen Walls
- John Hargreaves as Jacko Walls
- Lorna Lesley as Dorrie Walls
- Tony Barry as Constable O'Dea
- Steve Dodd as William Stanley, the Aboriginal tracker
- Les Foxcroft as Grumps
- Don Crosby as Cyril Grills
- Max Osbiston as Inspector James
- Vince Martin

== Synopsis ==
The film is based on the true story of a missing Australian child, Steven Walls (played by Dawes). After his disappearance, a massive search is organised across the Guyra area as its citizens spring into action.

The problem in finding Steven is that he was taught not to speak to strangers, and is afraid of those who attempt to speak to him. He does not know that the crowds of people attempting to make contact are not enemies, but have volunteered to find him.

Four days elapse and hope of his rescue diminishes. A group of searchers finally spot the boy and are able to convince him that they are there to help him get back home to his family.

== Production ==
The original director was John Powell and the budget was $150,000. Two weeks into the film in April 1978 the film was running into difficulties; $75,000 had been spent already and cheques to the crew were bouncing. Producer Allan Spiers called in Phil Avalon, who had just made a successful low budget film with Summer City. Avalon looked at the budget, felt that $200,000 was required to finish the film, and succeeded in raising the additional funds from the investors, who he says were state government senators from Brisbane. Avalon negotiated with the actors to reduce their fees, which he felt were too excessive for a low budget film. Avalon says ninety percent of the cast agreed to do this. He then tried to do this with the crew, and several of them left, including the cinematographer. Unions threatened to shut down the film but Avalon managed to keep it afloat.

Avalon hired Terry Bourke, who had directed him on Inn of the Damned, to rewrite the script and direct the rest of the movie with Powell. The rest of the film was completed in nine days.

Steven Walls, who inspired the story, plays a small role as one of the men at the bar, who are asked to join in the search. Johnny Ashcroft has a brief cameo as one of the searchers by the camp fire at night. Steven's grandmother and many of the original searchers acted as searchers in the movie.

== Release ==
The film premiered in Armidale, NSW.

Avalon says he and Bourke fell out over the editing of the film and that Bourke "refused to listen. I could have fired him but rather than go through the process I walked and took my name off the film." Avalon quit the film industry for the next five years.

Terry Bourke later sued producer Alan Spires, production company John Powell Productions and distributors Filmways for $6,130 in unpaid wages.

Avalon says the film "was a very unhappy experience. The film didn't do any real business. The day-to-day pressure of dealing with finance, unions, crew and talent who had not forgiven me for the reduction in their salaries, saw me lose weight and keep to myself. When it finished I decided to break from the film industry. Under pressure I also sought help from a crew member, which was a mistake. After the movie, Karmen [his wife] and I decided to separate. It was one of the worst years of my life."

== Legacy ==
Terry Bourke published a book titled Little Boy Lost that was based on his screenplay.

Steven Walls died on his Guyra property in April 2020.

The Guyra Historical Museum’s Steven Walls / Little Boy Lost display opened on 3 October 2020. A poster and details of the movie are featured.

The Johnny Ashcroft and Gay Kayler Legacy Collection was presented to the Australian Country Music Hall of Fame in Tamworth (Gamilaraay Country) on 28 May 2022, with a Welcome to Country and Smoking Ceremony. The segment, Little Boy Lost, the Search, Song, Movie and Beyond, with one hundred and three items in its catalogue, was part of this collection.
