= Brass Monkeys =

Australian television sitcom (1984)

- Series title card
- Genre: Sitcom
- Based on: Twelve Below by Gary Reilly; Tony Sattler
- Written by: Gary Reilly; Tony Sattler
- Directed by: Kevin Burston
- Starring: Graeme Blundell; Paul Chubb; Kev Golsby; Ross Hohnen; Margie McCrae; Colin McEwan; Doug Scroope; Bill Young
- Theme music composer: Mike Perjanik
- Country of origin: Australia
- Original language: English
- No. of series: 1
- No. of episodes: 13

Production
- Producers: Gary Reilly; Tony Sattler
- Editor: Noel Brady
- Camera setup: Multi-camera
- Running time: 30 minutes
- Production company: RS Productions

Original release
- Network: Seven Network
- Release: 7 November 1984

Brass Monkeys is an Australian television sitcom that was first broadcast in 1984 on the Seven Network. The series was written and produced by Gary Reilly and Tony Sattler, who were known for comedy series The Naked Vicar Show and Kingswood Country. The title comes from the colloquial expression "cold enough to freeze the balls off a brass monkey", in reference to the cold climate of the Antarctic.

== Synopsis ==
Brass Monkeys is the story of a pretty female doctor who joins a group of men confined to the lonely isolation of an Australian Antarctic expedition station.

== Cast ==
- Graeme Blundell as Noddy
- Paul Chubb as Big Eye
- Kev Golsby as Hugo the OIC ("officer in charge")
- Ross Hohnen as Rex (aka, "the Ferret")
- Margie McCrae as Dr Sally Newman
- Colin McEwan as Nick
- Doug Scroope as Cookie
- Bill Young as Martin "Marty" Lightfoot

== Background and production ==
The series was based on a television pilot titled Twelve Below, written by Reilly and Sattler. The pilot was devised as a vehicle for Noel Ferrier. However, owing to Ferrier's schedule, he proved unavailable to star in the series. The pilot starred Ferrier as OIC, Robert Hughes as Noddy, Cornelia Frances as Dr Sally Newman, Colin McEwan as Nick and Jeff Ashby as Rex, aka, "the Ferret". Only McEwan returned for Brass Monkeys.

An original draft script and a camera script were written for each episode. Each episode was recorded twice before a live studio audience, using the camera scripts. The two recordings were then edited into one recording, using the best audience reaction from each recording. The series was recorded on Saturdays at Sydney's Epping Studios.

The series is the only example of a situation comedy set in Antarctica.

Owing to exhaustion at having to write the scripts for this series, coupled with those of their previous series, writer Tony Sattler left RS Productions, the company operated by him and writing partner Gary Reilly, leaving Reilly to form his own company, Gary Reilly Productions, in 1984. This was the final series written by Reilly and Sattler as part of their production company RS Productions, until they reunited in 1997 for Bullpitt!.

== Episodes ==
Cameral rehearsals for the thirteen episodes took place between March and June 1983, in an old hall in Balmain. All thirteen episodes exist in the National Film and Sound Archive. The first seven episodes aired on the 7 Network from 7 November to 19 December, on Wednesdays at 8:00 pm after Kingswood Country. The series was repeated from 14 July to 13 October 1994 on the 7 Network.

No.	Title	Directed by	Written by	Original release date
1	"Just What the Doctor Ordered"	Kevin Burston	Gary Reilly and Tony Sattler	7 November 1984
2	"The Ring of Confidence Trick"	Kevin Burston	Gary Reilly and Tony Sattler	14 November 1984
3	"Pawn Night Down South"	Kevin Burston	Gary Reilly and Tony Sattler	21 November 1984
4	"Krill of My Dreams"	Kevin Burston	Gary Reilly and Tony Sattler	28 November 1984
5	"My Cut Runneth Over"	Kevin Burston	Gary Reilly and Tony Sattler	5 December 1984
6	"The Spy Who Stayed in the Cold"	Kevin Burston	Gary Reilly and Tony Sattler	12 December 1984
7	"Do You, Cookie, Take Whatsername?"	Kevin Burston	Gary Reilly and Tony Sattler	19 December 1984
8	"Whose Turn in the Hot Seat?"	Kevin Burston	Gary Reilly and Tony Sattler	TBA
9	"Yes, We Have No Tomatoes"	Kevin Burston	Gary Reilly and Tony Sattler	TBA
10	"A Nick Named Sue"	Kevin Burston	Gary Reilly and Tony Sattler	TBA
11	"Penguin Madness"	Kevin Burston	Gary Reilly and Tony Sattler	TBA
12	"Waiting for Noddy"	Kevin Burston	Gary Reilly and Tony Sattler	TBA
Marty requires a volunteer to accompany him on a short trek across the Antarctic. Noddy, inspired by the antics of famous French yachtsman Jacques Godot, agrees to the trip. Three days later, Marty returns to base alone. He informs the crew that Noddy has disappeared from their tent during a blizzard. After two days's searching, the OIC declares Noddy missing, presumed dead and reads Noddy's will to the crew members, while the Ferret charges Marty with culpable negligence and places him under house arrest. Noddy, meanwhile, returns to his base quarters, where Big Eye is reading Noddy's will. Big Eye convinces Noddy to pretend to remain dead, so they can split the life insurance pay-out stipulated in the will. However, Marty enters their room and instead suggests that together they get revenge on the Ferret. Later in the recreation room, the crew are all gathered listening to the OIC's anecdotes, when Jacques Godot arrives. However, the Ferret discovers that the real Godot had arrived at another Antarctic base that day. Having fooled the Ferret, Godot removes his disguise to reveal himself to be Noddy. (Note: This episode synopsis has been written based on an off-air recording of an episode currently published on YouTube (see External links below). Owing to the video and episode itself not featuring an episode title, it has been determined that the off-air recording would most likely be this episode, based on the episode's plot and similar runtime to the copy held in the National Film and Sound Archive.)
13	"The Cold Gold Rush"	Kevin Burston	Gary Reilly and Tony Sattler	TBA
