= Mike Perjanik =

New Zealand musician

- Born: New Zealand
- Occupations: Musician; record producer; composer; arranger; bandleader

Mike Perjanik is a New Zealand-born musician, record producer, composer, arranger and bandleader who became well known in Australia from the late 1960s for his work on pop and rock recordings, and as a composer, arranger, bandleader and producer of music for film, television and advertising.

== New Zealand career ==
Although largely self-taught as a keyboard player, arranger and composer, Perjanik's skills soon made him a prominent figure on the thriving New Zealand music scene of the mid-1960s. After moving to Auckland in 1963 he joined local group The Embers and encouraged his friend Doug Jerebine to follow him; Jerebine eventually joined Perjanik in The Embers after a short stint in the popular band The Keil Isles.

Perjanik began writing music and his songs were recorded by New Zealand pop singers such as Dinah Lee; he also arranged music for Ray Columbus and toured with visiting international performers like Gene Pitney. One of the Perjanik Group's first sessions was backing a new singing duo discovered by Viking Records boss Ron Dalton; the duo, Sue and Judy Donaldson (who were childhood friends of La De Da's guitarist Kevin Borich) were renamed by Perjanik as the Chicks; The Mike Perjanik Group backed them on their debut single "Heart of Stone"/"I Want You To Be My Boy" and in 1966 they also backed The Chicks on their single "The Rebel Kind".

Perjanik discovered another talented female singer while he was playing at a hotel. Impressed by her powerful voice Perjanik informed Ron Dalton of his discovery and she was soon brought to the Viking studio to record "Tumblin' Down", which was released under the singer's new stage name Maria Dallas.

Perjanik helped launch the career of vocalist Allison Durbin. They first worked together when Durbin was backed by Perjanik's band in the studio and they subsequently began a relationship. Durbin was soon performing as the band's featured singer and in October 1966. After nine months with the band, Durbin left to pursue a solo career; she subsequently scored several hit singles in Australia, was named as Australia's "Queen of Pop" and became a prominent recording and TV performer in the 1970s.

== Australian career ==
Settling permanently in Australia, Perjanik established himself as a sought-after record producer. In around 1969, he was appointed as an A&R manager and house producer for EMI Australia's Columbia label.

As well as his composing, recording and production work, Perjanik has been a board member of the Australasian Performing Right Association (APRA) for 15 years and chaired the APRA board for over ten years.

He also wrote, produced and arranged the theme songs for the TV programs Home and Away, A Country Practice and The Restless Years, which was a hit for Renée Geyer, released on RCA Australia; Perjanik's instrumental was featured on the single's B-side. He also composed the dramatic music underscores used in scenes in Home And Away at least in the early years of the series.

== Television theme tune credits ==
Year	Title	Notes
1972	Private Collection	Film
1976	The Outsiders	
1977–1978	The Naked Vicar Show	
1977–1979	Chopper Squad	
1977	Mick and the Moon	Short
1977–1979	Glenview High	
1977–1979	The Restless Years	
1979	Days I'll Remember in South Australia	Short
1979	The Mysterious Bee	Documentary
1980	Arcade	
1980–1984	Kingswood Country	
1981	Daily at Dawn	
1981	Holiday Island	
1981–1991	A Country Practice	
1982	Norman Loves Rose	Film
1983	Bush Christmas	Film
1984	Brass Monkeys	
1984	Queen of the Road	
1985	Warming Up	Film
1986	Land of Hope	
1986	Hector's Bunyip	
1987–1991	Rafferty's Rules	
1987–1994	Hey Dad..!	
1988–present	Home and Away	
1989	Grim Pickings	
1989	The Family Business	
1989	The Power, the Passion	
1990	Family and Friends	
1991	Hampton Court	
1992	Late for School	
1992	My Two Wives	
1996	Whipping Boy	TV film
1997–1998	Bullpitt!	
1998–1999	Breakers	
1999	Without Warning	TV film
