= Robina Beard =

Australian actor, dancer and choreographer

Robina Beard OAM
- Born: 1938 (age 87–88); Twickenham, England
- Occupations: Actor, dancer and choreographer
- Years active: 1955–present
- Known for: "Madge the Manicurist " in the Palmolive ads in Australia and New Zealand

Robina Beard (born 1938) is an English-born Australian actress, dancer, choreographer and theatre director, singer and lyricist. Beard has appeared in numerous stage productions, film parts and TV guest roles, and worked briefly as a TV weather presenter, but is best known as character "Madge the Manicurist" in the Palmolive dishwashing liquid television advertisements Australia and New Zealand.

She had an early recurring role in local TV series Number 96 between 1974 and 1976, as Raelene Shackleton the daughter of hen-pecked pensioner Herb Evans Ron Shand, but has appeared in smaller parts, cameos and guest roles in many internationally successful TV series

== Early life ==
Robina Beard was born in Twickenham, London, England in 1938, and came to Australia with her family in 1949. Her education in dance began at age six and in Sydney she was trained in the Cecchetti method.

== Career ==
Her professional career began in 1955 when she danced in the musical Can-Can for J. C. Williamson's. She performed in a number of musicals and plays at the Phillip Street Theatre including Alice in Wonderland in 1959 and The Boy Friend in 1968. She appeared as Dormouse in the 1962 teleplay of Alice in Wonderland, alongside Noel Ferrier (Humpty Dumpty) and Chips Rafferty (White Knight).

Beard joined GTV-9 in Melbourne in 1965, working first as their first weather girl and then appearing on In Melbourne Tonight. She also appeared in Barley Charlie, the first sitcom produced in Australia and shown across the Nine Network. She subsequently had roles in many well-known Australian series, including No. 96, G.P., Home and Away and All Saints.

Beard is best known as 'Madge', the manicurist in the Australian and New Zealand advertisements, for Palmolive dishwashing liquid from 1968, with the slogan, "You're soaking in it".

She adapted and directed a production of The Wizard of Oz which played at the Regent Theatre during the 1980 Festival of Sydney. In 1981 she directed Greg Millin's Robin Hood, which was described as "wonderful school holiday entertainment for the whole family". She re-staged Sesame Street Live at the Capitol Theatre for the 1982 Festival of Sydney, then toured the production on a 16-week tour of Australia followed by New Zealand and Asia.

In 2018 Playscript published her book, My Life – You're Soaking In It.

Beard first performed the role of Daisy Bates in the play, Tales of Kabbarli, by Geoffrey Sykes at 313 Theatre, Coniston, New South Wales in 2007. She is reprising the play in Sydney in 2023 at Actor's Pulse in Redfern.

== Awards and recognition ==
Beard was awarded the Medal of the Order of Australia in the 2011 Australia Day Honours for "service to the arts, particularly through dance". In July of the same year she received the Lifetime Achievement Award at the Australian Dance Awards.

In 2026, she served as Australia Day Ambassador for Blayney Shire Council.

== Filmography ==
=== Film ===
Title	Year	Role	Type
1959	Johnny Belinda		TV movie
1977	Dot and the Kangaroo	Voice	Animated film
1984	Kindred Spirits	Choreographer	TV movie
1985	Rebel	Emu Dancers	Feature film
2014	Rites of Passage	Nan	Feature film
2026	Insidious: Out of the Further	Edna	Feature film

=== Television ===
Title	Year	Role	Type
1964	Barley Charlie	Shirley Muggleton	TV series
1964	The Lorrae Desmond Show	Herself	TV series, 1 episode
1972	The Spoiler	Tea Lady	TV series
1976	Behind the Legend		TV anthology series, 1 episode
1974-77	Number 96	Raylene Shackleton	TV series
1978	Tickled Pink	Sarah	TV special
1979	Chopper Squad	Betty Pearce	TV series
1981	Daily at Dawn	Nell	TV series
1980-82	Kingswood Country	Aunty Vi / Maj	TV series
1986	The Flying Doctors	Dot Collins	TV series
1985-89	A Country Practice	Gwen Loveday / Dulcie Locke	TV series
1991	G.P.	Betty Nichols	TV series
1998	Bullpitt!	Gwen the Ranger	TV series
2001	All Saints	Nora Bead, Jesse's Mother	TV series
2001	Home and Away	Mavis	TV series
2008	Review with Myles Barlow	Bronwyn	TV series
2009	Sea Princesses	Starfish Grandmother	TV series
2012	The Moodys	Gwen Dawes	TV miniseries
2014	Soul Mates	Elderly Woman	TV series
2015	How Not to Behave	Ensemble cast member	TV series
2023	Last King of the Cross	Dave's Grandma	TV miniseries
