= Sheila Kennelly =

Australian actress (1937–2026)

- Born: Sheila Smith; 28 December 1937; West Sussex, England
- Died: 14 September 2026 (aged 88); Hunter Valley, New South Wales, Australia
- Other name: Sheila Kenneally
- Education: Independent Theatre
- Occupation: Actress
- Years active: 1950–1971, 1977–1994 (theatre and radio); 1964–2008 (television & film)
- Known for: Home and Away (TV series) as Floss McPhee; Number 96 (TV series) as Norma Whittaker; Secret Valley as Cecillia Cribbens; Kingswood Country (TV series) as Rosa Berlucci

Sheila Kennelly (nee Smith; 28 December 1937 – 14 September 2026), also credited as Sheila Kenneally, was an Australian actress of theatre and music hall, television and film, with a career spanning over 50 years. From the early 1950s onwards, her early career was based exclusively in radio and theatre and she did not start her screen career until the late 1960s becoming known for her roles in TV soap operas, serials, sitcoms and mini-series.

Kennelly made her debut in radio in 1950 playing a 55-year old German woman. She primarily played characters older than her actual age and became best known as the bubbly pub/wine bar owner and barmaid Norma Whitaker in Number 96 and as cheery Rosa Bertolucci in Kingswood Country. She was best known in Australia and internationally for her brief stint as the retired carnival worker Floss McPhee, an original character in Home and Away in the series' first year (with several guest stints) before being written out as producers wanted to concentrate on a younger and updated cast.

== Early life ==
Kennelly was born Sheila Smith in West Sussex, England, and grew up in Brighton. She arrived with her family in Australia in 1950.

She attended North Sydney Girls High School

== Career ==
Kennelly started her acting career after arriving in Australia and working for George Edwards Radio Productions, originally as a transcriber before working as a casting director and on television in I Am A Camera.

Her career in stage plays began in 1958, appearing with such companies as the Australian Elizabethan Trust, Old Tote Theatre, Independent Theatre and the Nimrod Theatre Company, before undertaking a lengthy arts tour with A View from the Bridge and starring in numerous roles with the Neutral Bay Music Hall.

She was a staple of the small screen from the mid-1960s until retiring in 2008, firstly appearing in plays at the ABC before taking soap opera and comedy relief roles.

Kennelly became a household name in the popular serial Number 96 as the brassy and bubbly barmaid Norma Whittaker, a comedy character opposite Gordon McDougall as her husband Les who was a ward orderly and aspiring amateur inventor. Norma's trademark catchphrase was calling everyone "Ducky". Her husband Les was killed off in the infamous bomb blast storyline, but Norma remained with the series for 4 1/2 years, returning for the final episode. Both characters also featured briefly in the Number 96 feature film version.

In one storyline, a fictional artist (played by Owen Weingott) visits the apartment and requests to paint a nude portrait of Norma; the painting is subsequently hung in the wine bar. This famed portrait of Norma was in reality painted by the network's art director Eunice Dyer and was based on "Chloé" a painting at a Melbourne hotel. A copy of the portrait was given to Kennelly's costar Tom Oliver, who housed it at a wine establishment business he owned in Sydney called Jack's Cellar.

In a 2009 reunion with the cast of Number 96 on Where Are They Now?, Kennelly stated she had wanted to become a serious actor featuring in plays by such dramatists as Arthur Miller and Bertolt Brecht, but ended up in Number 96 instead as Norma, in which she used a blonde wig to disguise 'the real Sheila'.

From 1980 until 1984, she appeared opposite Ross Higgins in the sitcom Kingswood Country. She played 'cheery Italian wog', Rosa Berlucci who looked after Ted Bullpitt when his wife Thel (played by Judi Farr) left him.

Throughout the 1980s, she continued to make appearances in serials such as Glenview High, children's series Secret Valley, The Flying Doctors and in a few guest roles in A Country Practice.

In 1987, she was given the choice of appearing in a small role in the film Evil Angels. She stated at the time she would have loved to have been in the film, purely to be able to say she had appeared with Meryl Streep, but ultimately turned it down to appear in new Seven Network soap opera Home and Away as one of 16 original characters. She played retired carnival worker Floss McPhee for the first year of screening, but was eventually written out, alongside Frank Lloyd who played her husband Nev, as the producers wanted to concentrate on a younger cast and updated formula. She would later return to reprise her role of Floss for several guest appearances.

Kennelly's later roles included guest parts in The Flying Doctors, Big Sky (in 1997), and medical drama All Saints.

== Personal life and death ==
Kennelly was briefly married to Chris Christensen in 1958 when they left Sydney and lived on a farm on the New South Wales Central Coast. Christensen died two and a half years later from a heart attack. Kennelly settled on a farm in the Hunter Valley region. She remarried in 1980 to mining engineer John Griffiths and had no children. Her husband died in 2009.

Kennelly having suffered a stroke died at her home in the Hunter Valley, on 14 September 2026, at the age of 88.

== Filmography ==
=== Film ===
Year	Title	Role	Type
1974	Number 96	Norma Whittaker	Feature film
1982	Fluteman	Myra Hansen	Feature film
1987	The Tale of Ruby Rose	Cook	Feature film
1993	Shotgun Wedding	(Voice)	Feature film

=== Television ===
Year	Title	Role	Type
1964	Rape of the Belt	Hippobomene	TV play
1967	You Can't See 'Round Corners	Guest role: Linda	TV series, 1 episode
1968	The Cell	Sister Veynard	TV movie
1968	The Queen's Bishop		TV play
1969	Woobinda, Animal Doctor	Guest role	TV series, 1 episode
1969	Tilley Landed On Our Shore		TV play
1970	Pastures of the Blue Crane	Rose Bradley	TV series, 1 episode
1971	The Comedy Game		TV series, season 1, episode: "Arthur"
1972	Division 4	Guest roles: Mrs Allen / Mrs Villani	TV series
1972–1975	Number 96	Regular role: Norma Whittaker	TV series, 243 episodes
1977	Number 96: The Final Night	Herself (with Number 96 cast)	TV series, 1 episode
1977	All at Sea	Mrs. Hand	TV movie
1978	Puzzle	Mrs. Foster	TV movie US / Australia
1979	Doctor Down Under	Guest role: Mrs. Ellis	TV series, 1 episode
1979	Glenview High	Recurring guest role: Val Deevney	TV series, 2 episodes
1979; 1980; 1982	The Mike Walsh Show	Guest	TV series, 3 episodes
1979	Carrots	Regular role: Mabel Dobbs	TV series
1980; 1982	Secret Valley	Regular role: Cecillia Cribbins	TV series, 14 episodes
1982–1984	Kingswood Country	Regular role: Rosa Bertolucci	TV series, 31 episodes
1981	Daily at Dawn	Recurring guest role	TV series, 2 episodes
1982	Spring and Fall	Guest role: Marj	TV series, 1 episode
1982–1993	A Country Practice	Guest roles: Hazel Walmsley / Mary Sheridan / Val Laski	TV series, 6 episodes
1983	Return to Eden	Lizzie	TV miniseries, 1 episode
1984	Sweet and Sour	Recurring guest role: Darryl's Mum	TV series, 2 episodes
1984	Mail Order Bride	Dorothy	TV movie
1985	Winners	Mrs. Tinsley	TV series
1985	Anzacs	Recurring role: Mrs. Baker	TV miniseries, 4 episodes
1986	Kids 21st Birthday Channel Ten Telethon	Guest (with Number 96 cast: Johnny Lockwood, Bettina Welch, Elizabeth Kirkby, Vicki Raymond, Pat McDonald, Wendy Blacklock, Harry Michaels, Chard Hayward, Frances Hargreaves & Abigail)	TV special
1987	The Flying Doctors	Guest role: Hannah Robson	TV series, 1 episode
1988–1989, 2000; 2002; 2004; 2008	Home and Away	Regular / recurring role: Floss McPhee	TV series, 131 episodes
1990	Come in Spinner		TV miniseries, 4 episodes
1990	How Wonderful!	Aunt Helen	TV movie
1990	The Flying Doctors	Guest role: Merle Demster / Hannah Robson	TV series, 2 episodes
1991	Hampton Court	Guest role: Mrs. Verstak	TV series, 1 episode
1997	Big Sky	Guest role: Betty	TV series, 1 episode
2001; 2007	All Saints	Guest roles: Rada Verzina / Mary Moore	TV series, 4 episodes

== Theatre ==
Year	Production	Role	Venue / Co.
1958	Under Milk Wood		Independent Theatre, Sydney
1959	Sur Le Pont		Independent Theatre, Sydney
1960	A View from the Bridge		Independent Theatre, Sydney, Cooma, NSW, Broken Hill Town Hall
1961	Ondine		University of Sydney
1961	An Evening of Grands Guignoi		University of Sydney
1962	Shipwreck		Union Hall at University of Sydney
1964	How the West Was Lost		Neutral Bay Music Hall
1967	Virtue in Peril, or, Castle, Curses or Caresses		Neutral Bay Music Hall
1968	Her Only Mistake		Neutral Bay Music Hall
1966	The Face at the Window		Neutral Bay Music Hall, Sydney
1969	O'Vile Pretender, or, The Maiden and the Actor		Neutral Bay Music Hall, Sydney
1969	The Sins of Society		Neutral Bay Music Hall
1970	Cox and Box		AMP Theatrette, Sydney
1970	Face of a Man		Majestic Cinemas, Sydney
1971	Flash Jim Vaux		Nimrod Street Theatre, Sydney
1971	The National Health or Nurse Norton's Affair		UNSW, Old Tote Parade Theatre
1971	A Break in the Music		Independent Theatre, Sydney
1977	The Visit	Edna	Bondi Pavilion, Sydney
1977	The Political Bordello; or, How Waiters Got the Vote	Mrs	Bondi Pavilion, Sydney
1985	The Maitland and Morpeth String Quartet		Newcastle Region Art Gallery
1986	Farewell Brisbane Ladies		Playhouse, Newcastle
1989	Curtains		Northside Theatre, Sydney
1991	Steaming		Theatre Royal, Sydney
1993	Hot Taps		Riverside Theatres Parramatta
1994	Choice		Newcastle Civic Theatre, Bridge Theatre Coniston, Q Theatre Penrith
	The Hostage		
