= Maggie Dence =

Australian actress and comedian (born 1942)

Maggie Dence AM
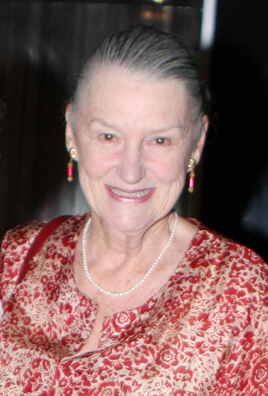
- Dence in January 2013
- Born: Margaret Helen Dence; 1 February 1942 (age 84); Chatswood, New South Wales, Australia
- Occupations: Actress, comedienne
- Years active: 1959–present
- Known for: The Mavis Bramston Show as Mavis Bramston; The Sullivans as Rose Sullivan; Kingswood Country as Merle Bullpitt; Prisoner as Bev Baker; Neighbours as Dorothy Burke
- Spouse: Graham Rouse (m. 1965; died 2021)

Margaret Helen Dence AM (born 1 February 1942) is an Australian actress of stage and screen, with a career spanning some seven decades. Dence is known to early audiences for her roles in the satirical TV comedy The Mavis Bramston Show, and also serving as that series' mascot (originally portrayed in the pilot by Noeline Brown). Dence featured in comedy Kingswood Country with stars Ross Higgins and Judi Farr as snobbish Merle Bullpit. Her dramatic roles include Rose Sullivan in The Sullivans, Bev Baker in Prisoner, and school headmistress Dorothy Burke in Neighbours.

== Career ==
=== Mavis Bramston and Kingswood Country ===
Dence played various characters influential Australian satirical sketch comedy program The Mavis Bramston Show from 1966 and 1968. One of her characters was the title character Mavis Bramston – the joke being that Mavis appeared in only the opening segment of each episode and was not seen again thereafter. She was also a recurring guest in the popular 1980s sitcom Kingswood Country, playing the snobbish Merle Bulpitt.

=== Soap opera: The Sullivans, Prisoner and Neighbours ===
Her best-known soap opera roles are The Sullivans as the sweet-natured Rose Sullivan between 1976 and 1978, and Prisoner in a darker role in 1984 as an evil psychopath and serial killer called Bev 'The Beast' Baker. She played stern school headmistress Dorothy Burke in Neighbours from 1990. Dence decided to leave the show in late 1992 and she filmed her final scenes in November. She then travelled to the UK, where she played the Fairy Godmother in a pantomime production of Cinderella.

=== Other roles ===
Dence also had smaller cameo roles in TV serials A Country Practice, The Flying Doctors, All Saints and Heartbreak High.

In 2005, she appeared in the award-winning Australian film Look Both Ways.

== Personal life ==
Dence was married to actor and director Graham Rouse for 56 years until his death in June 2021. They met at the Independent Theatre in Sydney.

== Awards and recognition ==
Dence was named (on 29 September) the 2011 recipient of the Equity Awards Lifetime Achievement Award for her outstanding services to the performing arts – both stage and screen – and her longstanding involvement with the NSW Actors' Benevolent Fund. The award, presented by Foxtel, is from Maggie's peers and members of her union, the Media, Entertainment & Arts Alliance Equity (Performers) Section, which she joined in 1962.

Dence was appointed a Member of the Order of Australia (AM) in the 2022 Queen's Birthday Honours "for service to the performing arts".

== Filmography ==
=== Film ===
Year	Title	Role	Notes
1971	Wake in Fright	Receptionist	Feature film
1982	The Best of Friends	Shop assistant	Feature film
1982	The Return of Captain Invincible	Italian Lady	Feature film
1988	Cherith		Film short
1989	Luigi's Ladies	Shandra	Feature film
2003	Danny Deckchair	Meredith Butcher	Feature film
2003	Peter Pan	Lady Quiller Couch	Feature film
2005	Look Both Ways	Joan	Feature film
2009	Grace	Nona	Film short
2015	The Witching Hour	Old Witch	Film short
2015	The Widow	Elaine	Film short
2016	The Mother Situation		Film short
2016	Setaceous		Film short
2018	Granny	Granny	Film short
2018	Inside Water	Yabby	Film short
2019	Strangers	Bibi	Film short
20??	Dirt Cheap	Irene	Feature film
2021	The Drover's Wife	Mrs. Shirley McGuiness	Feature film
2023	The Appleton Ladies' Potato Race	Miss Vaughn	Feature film

=== Television ===
Year	Title	Role	Notes
1966–1968	The Mavis Bramston Show	Mavis Bramston	TV series (regular lead role)
1967; 1975	Homicide	Elaine Fleming	TV series, 1 episode: "The Legacy"
1968–1969	I've Married a Bachelor		TV series, 3 episodes "You Tell Me Your Dreams, I'll Tell You My Dreams", "Into the Breach"
1969	Skippy the Bush Kangaroo	Soprano	TV series, 1 episode: "El Toro"
1970	The Link Men	Edie Whitman	TV series, 1 episode 11: "Somebody's Kid Is Missing"
1972	A Nice Day at the Office	Mrs. Quiggley	TV series, 1 episode
1973	Boney	Mrs. Coutts	TV series, 1 episode: "Boney and the Emu Man"
1973	Division 4	Marion Evans	TV series, 1 episode: "Willie"
1974	Silent Number	Nurse Janet Kay	TV series, 1 episode: "Bang, Bang, You're Dead"
1975	Homicide	Anne Carson / Elaine Fleming	TV series, 1 episode: "Brick Veneer"
1976–1979	The Sullivans	Aunty Rose Sullivan	TV series, 250 episodes
1979	Doctor Down Under	Mrs. Peabody	TV series, 1 episode: "A Bird in the Hand"
1980	Trial By Marriage		TV series
1980–1984	Kingswood Country	Merle Bullpit	TV series, 18 episodes;
1981	A Town Like Alice	Mrs. O'Connor	TV miniseries, 2 episodes
1981	Daily at Dawn		TV series, 1 episode
1981	A Country Practice	Jan Hardy	TV series, 2 episodes: "Secrets: Parts 1 & 2"
1981	Holiday Island	Mrs Brandon	TV series, 1 episode
1981	Tickled Pink		TV series, 1 episode
1981	The World Around Us: Stress - It Wasn't Meant to be Easy	Herself	TV documentary
1982	A Country Practice	Courtney Fraser	TV series, 2 episodes: "Show Down: Parts 1 & 2"
1984	A Country Practice	Blanche Mitchell	TV series, 2 episodes: "Ships in the Night: Parts 1 & 2"
1984	Prisoner	Bev Baker	TV series, 6 episodes
1985	The Perfectionist	Rosie Peters	TV film
1985	Possession	Lady Shannon	TV series
1985	Winners: The Other Facts of Life	Psychiatrist	TV film
1987	Willing and Abel		TV series, 1 episode: "Miss September"
1987	The Flying Doctors	Helen Manning	TV series, 1 episode: "Sapphire"
1988	Act of Betrayal	Dorothy	TV film
1989	A Country Practice	Victoria Fleming	TV series, 2 episodes: "Bel Canto: Parts 1 & 2"
1989	Rafferty's Rules	Vanessa Pearce	TV series, 1 episode
1989	Edens Lost	Producer	TV miniseries, 4 episodes
1989	Home Brew	Marjorie Daley	TV film
1990	More Winners: The Big Wish	Lady Mikeevil	TV film
1990–1993	Neighbours	Dorothy Burke	TV series, 356 episodes
1994	G.P.	Judith Marr	TV series, 1 episode: "Coitus Interruptus"
1994	The Mavis Bramston 30th Anniversary	Herself	TV special
1995	Correlli	Maureen Barnes	TV series, 1 episode: "An Early Release"
1995	Neighbours: A 10th Anniversary Celebration	Herself	TV special
1997	Heartbreak High	Mrs. Mac	TV series, 1 episode
1998	Blue Heelers	Elizabeth Schulz	TV series, 1 episode: "Letting Go"
1998	Driven Crazy	Granny Rose	TV series, 1 episode: "Mousechap"
1998–2007	All Saints	Lyn Brown / Maggie Cooper / June Markham	TV series, 5 episodes
2000	Water Rats	Joy Turner	TV series, 1 episode: "Mummy Dearest"
2000	Grass Roots	Ellen Leonard	TV series, 1 episode: "The Whole Year"
2000	Stingers	Celia Jones	TV series, 1 episode: "Organised Crime"
2002	Fairy Tale Police Department	Voice	TV series, 26 episodes: "Pinocchio: Puppet in Peril"
2002	Always Greener	Sister Stern	TV series, 1 episode: "Understanding the Cry"
2002–2003	All Saints	June Markham	TV series, 3 episodes: "Chemistry", "Trust", "Friend in Need"
2006	Small Claims: The Reunion	Roma	TV film
2008	Milly, Molly	Miss Blythe	TV series
2008	Out of the Blue	Olive Hammond	TV series, 17 episodes
2013	The Very Trevor Ashley Show	Old Lady	TV series, 1 episode: "Pilot"
2013–2015	Wonderland	Ruth MacPherson	TV series, 9 episodes
2014; 2016	Black Comedy		TV series, 2 episodes
2015	Ready for This	Mabel	TV series, 1 episode: "Fresh Meat"
2016	Rake	Janet	TV series, 1 episode: "4.3"
2017	Attack! Attack! Art?	Gran	TV series, 4 episodes
2019	The Commons	Janice	TV miniseries, 1 episode
2019	Frayed	Mrs Atkins	TV series, 7 episodes
2022–2026	Heartbreak High	Nan	TV series, 12 episodes
2022	Significant Others	Pam	TV series, 3 episodes
2022	Pushing The Boundaries: The Mavis Bramston Show	Herself	Film documentary
2023	The Messenger	Milla Roseby	TV series, 6 episodes
2023	Queen of Oz	June	TV series, 1 episode: "Ginger Eyebrows"

== Theatre ==
Year	Production	Venue
1959	Volpone	Independent Theatre
1960	The Crucible	Independent Theatre
1960	Clerambard	Independent Theatre
1960	Inherit the Wind	Independent Theatre
1962	Rhinoceros	Independent Theatre
1962	What's New?	Phillip St Theatre
1962	The Rose and the Ring	Independent Theatre
1963	The Rage	Copenhagen Downstairs Revue
1963	Twenties Spectacular	Independent Theatre
1963	Abousir and Aboukir	Independent Theatre
1966	Muriel's Virtues	Independent Theatre
1967	Hail Gloria Fitzpatrick	Phillip St Theatre
1968	Breath of Spring	Independent Theatre
1969	The Women	Independent Theatre
1970	Oh, Sir Henry!	Melbourne Athenaeum
1972	Blop Goes the Weazel	University of NSW, Parade Theatre 1
1973	Bonbons and Roses for Dolly	Jane Street Theatre
1974	Kookaburra	Nimrod Theatre
1975	Girl's Night Out	Jools Theatre Restaurant
1975	Balance of Payments	Tregear Community Centre & AMP Theatrette, Sydney (2 performances)
1976	Still Life with Apples	Bankstown Town Hall & AMP Theatrette, Sydney (2 performances)
1976	Kennedy's Children	Nimrod Theatre
1976	The Shoemaker's Holiday	Sydney Opera House
1978	The Comedy of Errors	Nimrod Theatre
1978	The Lady from Maxim's	Sydney Opera House
1979	Last of the Red Hot Lovers	Ensemble Theatre
1979	The Sea	Nimrod Theatre
1980	Has He Anyone	Ensemble Theatre
1981	The Man from Mukinupin	Sydney Ooera House
1982	Annie	Canberra Theatre
1982	The Provok'd Wife	University of NSW, Parade Theatre
1982	Camino Real	University of NSW, Parade Theatre
1982	Four Lady Bowlers in a Golden Holden	Kinselas, Darlinghurst & Canberra Theatre
1983	Sweeney Todd	Q Theatre, Penrith
1984	The Season at Sarsaparilla	The Playhouse, Adelaide
1985	The Resistible Rise of Arturo Ui	Seymour Centre
1985	Arms and the Man	Seymour Centre
1986	Having a Ball..!	Canberra Theatre
1987	The One Day of the Year	Ensemble Theatre
1987	See How They Run	Northside Theatre, Killara,
1988	Steel Magnolias	Seymour Centre & Melbourne Athenaeum
1988	A Small Family Business	Northside Theatre, Killara
1989	Curtains	Northside Theatre, Killara
1993	Away	Riverside Theatres, Parramatta
1994	Goodworks	Q Theatre, Penrith
1996	The Shoe-Horn Sonata	Playhouse Theatre, Perth
1996	Virtual Unreality	Tilbury Hotel, Woolloomooloo
1996	Good Works	The Space, Adelaide & Wharf 2 Theatre, Sydney
1997	Mongrels	Wharf 1 Theatre, Sydney Theatre Company
1998	After the Ball	Sydney Opera House
2001	Noises Off	Sydney Opera House
2003	Uncle Vanya	Darlinghurst Theatre
2003	The Kid	Theatre Royal, Hobart
2005	Close to Home	Stables Theatre
2008	Attack of the Granny Boomers	Parade Theatre
2014	Once in Royal David's City	Belvoir Street Theatre
2015	Seventeen	Belvoir Street Theatre
2016	The Turquoise Elephant	Stables Theatre
2017	Bengal Tiger at the Baghdad Zoo	Old Fitzroy Theatre
2018	Marjorie Prime	Ensemble Theatre
2019	Baby Doll	Ensemble Theatre
