= Tony Sattler =

Australian TV writer/producer (born 1947)

- Born: 1947 (age 78–79)
- Occupations: TV screenwriter, radio scriptwriter, producer
- Known for: RS Productions with Gary Reilly
- Spouse: Noeline Brown (m. 1976)

Tony Sattler (born 1947) is an Australian television writer and producer best known for his development of the Australian television comedies The Naked Vicar Show and Kingswood Country with writer Gary Reilly.

== Early work ==
Tony Sattler worked as a creative director for the advertising agency George Patterson Y&R in Brisbane in 1972. He met fellow copywriter Gary Reilly and they worked on the production of commercials and jingles in Sydney. Reilly and Sattler began to collaborate on writing longer scripts for radio and television. They contributed satirical “anti-ads” to Sydney radio station 2JJ (now Triple J) advertising fictitious products. Reilly and Sattler created the successful parody radio serial for 2JJ entitled Chuck Chunder and the Space Patrol, which ran for 200 episodes and attracted a cult following on both 2JJ and Radio One. They wrote other parody radio serials including The Novels of Fiona Wintergreen which ran for 300 episodes and Doctors and Nurses which ran for 130.

Based on the success of their work the ABC commissioned Sattler and Reilly to write two hour-long scripts for Grahame Bond's Flash Nick from Jindavick in 1974. They were subsequently asked to write a half-hour sketch comedy series for Radio One (now Radio National) in 1975 which would become The Naked Vicar Show. The success of this program on radio encouraged them to develop a television concept for it in 1976, featuring the same performers Noeline Brown, Ross Higgins, Kevin Golsby and others. When the ABC turned it down, the Seven Network in Sydney took up the option. The Naked Vicar Show ran on radio, television and in theatre between 1975 and 1978.

Reilly and Sattler met Graham Kennedy in 1977 and they were asked to write a tonight show for him. He subsequently asked to feature in one of their radio serials. They created seven radio plays for him entitled Graham Kennedy's R.S. Playhouse, with him as the lead performer. The series won a number of awards and led to Reilly and Sattler continuing to contribute writing for Kennedy in his hosting and variety show appearances.

Exhausted by the pace of sketch writing, Reilly and Sattler moved into the situation comedy format in 1978. They submitted four scripts to the Seven Network and their work on Kingswood Country was ultimately selected for a full series. Kingswood Country featured the character Ted Bullpitt, who had been introduced in The Naked Vicar Show, and starred the same actor, Ross Higgins. The show ran from 1980 to 1984 and was produced by RS Productions, formed by Reilly and Sattler in 1975.

In 1981, Sattler and Reilly created a sitcom set in a newspaper office, Daily at Dawn which ran for 26 episodes. They also developed a sitcom set in Antarctica, Brass Monkeys, which ran for 13 episodes on the Seven network in 1984. By the end of 1984 had Sattler and Reilly had ended their partnership, and discontinued their production company.

They worked together again in 1997 to write a sequel to Kingswood Country: Bullpitt! which ran 1997–1998.

== Later work ==
Sattler and his wife Noeline Brown formed their own production company Wintergreen Productions. Sattler wrote and created a number of television pilots including The Bastards Next Door (1994), Freckle Me Dead, and My Three Wives with Australian dramatist David Mitchell.

Sattler produced and directed the documentary Graham Kennedy: The King of Television in 2000 and From Vaudeville to Video: a History of Australian Comedy in 2001. He staged the NSW Royal Bicentennial Concert and a number of other events.

In 2004 Sattler and Craig Pattinson completed their work on the creation of the Mary MacKillop Museum in North Sydney. Sattler also designed the Slim Dusty Museum in Kempsey and the Country Music Museum in Tamworth.

== Personal life ==
Sattler married actor Noeline Brown on 1 August 1976. They live in Sydney and the Southern Highlands of New South Wales. After working with television host and comedian Graham Kennedy during the 1970s on a number of productions, Sattler and Brown became close friends with him. After his retirement from the television industry Kennedy moved near the couple's home in Bowral where they helped manage his physical care as his health failed.

== Awards ==
Sattler won two Logie Awards with Gary Reilly — Best Comedy

- Kingswood Country 1981 and 1982.

Sattler won two Australian Writer's Guild AWGIE Awards with Gary Reilly — Best Comedy (radio)

- 1979 — You only live once
- 1980 — Sunday morning fever

He and Reilly received the 1997 Australian Writer's Guild Freddie Parsons Award for Lifetime Contribution to Comedy.
