= Paul Chubb =

Australian actor and screenwriter (1949–2002)

- Born: Paul Dunford; 14 January 1949; Arncliffe, New South Wales, Australia
- Died: 9 June 2002 (aged 53); Newcastle, New South Wales, Australia
- Occupations: Actor, lyricist, screenwriter

Paul Dunford (14 January 1949 – 9 June 2002), professionally billed as Paul Chubb, was an Australian film, television and stage actor and scriptwriter primarily in genres of comedy and drama.

== Early life ==
He was born in Arncliffe, a suburb of Sydney, and had two brothers Greg (Timothy Bean) and Fred (Fred Dunford) .

== Career ==
Chubb began his career as an 'everyman' character actor by studying under Hayes Gordon at Sydney's Ensemble Theatre, and began to appear in television commercials, soap operas including Number 96, and television dramas including Silent Number. He acted on stage alongside Judy Davis in Louis Nowra's Inside the Island. He wrote, directed and acted in pub plays and pantomimes before segueing to feature film work such as Stan and George's New Life (1990) alongside Julie Forsyth, which "remains a defining portrayal in a body of work" that includes Così (1996), Bliss (1985) and Road to Nhill (1997), encompassing a total of 22 feature films. He also starred as the titular character Dirk Trent in murder-mystery comedy film The Roly Poly Man (1994).

He had recurring roles in numerous television series including sitcom Daily at Dawn (1981) as Russell Ducke, comedy series Watch This Space (1982) as Rufus the alien, children's drama Betty's Bunch (1990) as Arthur Quinter 'The Con' and soap opera Home and Away (1999–2000) as Jack Brown. He hosted improvisational comedy series Theatre Sports on the ABC in 1988. He also appeared in long-running children's series Mr. Squiggle as the characters of Big Bob and Mr Wallop from 1986 to 1991.

Additionally, Chubb has appeared in several miniseries including The Dismissal (1983), Bodyline (1984), Dancing Daze (1986), Spit MacPhee (1988), The Paper Man (1990) and The Farm (2001).

Chubb guest starred as State Member of Parliament, Patrick Rafferty (Michael Rafferty's brother), in legal series Rafferty's Rules. He had guest roles in numerous other series including The Outsiders, Glenview High, Doctor Down Under, King's Men, Home Sweet Home, Spring & Fall, Kingswood Country, A Country Practice, Swap Shop, Round the Twist, G.P., Stark, High Tide, The Damnation of Harvey McHugh, Wedlocked, Big Sky, Water Rats, Bullpitt! and All Saints.

Other film credits include The Night the Prowler (1978), Heatwave, Kitty and the Bagman and Goodbye Paradise (all 1982), The Coca-Cola Kid (1985), Golden Braid (1990), Sweet Talker and Dead to the World (both 1991), Mad Bomber in Love (1992), Shotgun Wedding (1993), The Well (1997) and his last film Dirty Deeds (2002).

Chubb's last writing project was to script dialogue with Linda Nagle for The Australian Ballet and Sydney Dance Company stage production of Tivoli.

== Personal life and death ==
Chubb's real name was Paul Dunford – he took the name 'Chubb' because it accurately described his physique.

Chubb died on 9 June 2002, age 53, in Newcastle, New South Wales due to post operative cardiomyopathy complications. He was survived by one of his brothers.

== Filmography ==
=== Film ===
Year	Title	Role	Notes
1974	Number 96	Delivery Man	
1978	The Night the Prowler	Police Officer 1	
1980	Buckley's Chance	Ferdinand	Short film
1981	Hoodwink	Reid	
1982	Heatwave	Detective 2	
1982	Kitty and the Bagman	Slugger	
1982	Goodbye Paradise	Curly	
1983	Passionless Moments	Jim Simpson	
1983	It's a Living	Passenger	Short film
1984	A Girl's Own Story	Father	Short film
1985	The Coca-Cola Kid	Fred	
1985	Bliss	Reverend Des	
1986	Twelfth Night	Party Guest	
1987	Bullseye	Don McKenzie	
1987	With Love to the Person Next to Me	Syd	
1990	Golden Braid	Joseph	
1990	Tom and Elizabeth	Thomas	Short film
1991	Sweet Talker	Billy	
1991	Stan and George's New Life	Stanley Harris	
1991	Dead to the World	Sergeant Jack Grant	
1992	Mad Bomber in Love	Sven	
1993	Shotgun Wedding	Geoffrey Drinkwater	
1994	The Roly Poly Man	Dirk Trent	
1996	Così	Henry	
1997	The Well	Harry Bird	
1997	Road to Nhill	Maurie	
2002	Dirty Deeds	Sammy	

=== Television ===
Year	Title	Role	Notes
1974; 1976	Silent Number	Constable / Graham Clay	2 episodes
1974–1976	Number 96	Removalist / Clifford Jansen's friend / Deliveryman	3 episodes
1976	The Outsiders	Blue	1 episode
1977	Straight Enough		TV movie
1977–1978	Glenview High	Jim	4 episodes
1978	Demolition	Harry	TV movie
1979	Doctor Down Under	Barman	1 episode
1980	King's Men	The Bouncer	1 episode
1980	Home Sweet Home	The Policeman	1 episode
1980; 1982	Spring & Fall	Joe / Norm	Anthology series, 2 episodes
1981	Daily at Dawn	Russell Ducke	13 episodes
1981–1984	Kingswood Country	Errol / The Butler / Wayne Couch	3 episodes
1982	Watch This Space	Rufus	13 episodes
1983	The Dismissal	Customs Officer	Miniseries, 1 episode
1984	A Country Practice	Mac James / Ned Shelton	4 episodes
1984	Brass Monkeys	Big Eye	
1984	Bodyline	The Barracker	Miniseries, 2 episodes
1985	Robbery Under Arms	Mungo	TV movie
1986	Dancing Daze	Oliver	Miniseries, 6 episodes
1986	Hunger	Caffrey	TV movie
1987	Theatre Sports	Host	11 episodes
1987–1991	Rafferty's Rules	State MP Patrick Rafferty	3 episodes
1987–1991	Mr. Squiggle and Friends	Big Bob / Mr Wallop	22 episodes
1988	Danger Down Under	Dennis Quinn	TV movie
1988	Touch the Sun: Peter & Pompey	Mayor Leo Bainbridge	TV movie
1988	The Last Resort	Hilary Davis	
1988	Spit MacPhee	Sergeant Joe Collins	Miniseries, 4 episodes
1988	Swap Shop		
1988	Hard Knuckle	Max	TV movie
1988	Takeover	Frank	TV movie
1989	Round the Twist	'Santa Claws'	Christmas episode
1990	Betty's Bunch	Arthur Quinter 'The Con'	9 episodes
1990	The Paper Man	Clarrie Bullock	Miniseries, 6 episodes
1992	Big Ideas	Noel Draper	TV movie
1992–1996	G.P.	Nick Rawson / Peter Mayhew	3 episodes
1993	Stark	Mayor	2 episodes
1993	Singapore Sling	Cray	TV movie
1993	Count Me In – Combinatorics: The Art of Counting		
1994	High Tide		1 episode
1994	The Damnation of Harvey McHugh	Bob Shearer	1 episode
1994	Wedlocked	Big Bob	1 episode
1997	Big Sky	Detective Cook	1 episode
1998	Water Rats	Judge Moreton	1 episode
1998	Bullpitt!	Dave Dempsey	1 episode
1999	Bondi Banquet	Bart L. Booth	
1999–2000	Home and Away	Jack Brown	11 episodes
2001	The Farm	Ron Oakes	Miniseries, 3 episodes
1999–2001	All Saints	Sam Coen / William Lucas	2 episodes

== Stage ==
=== As actor ===
Year	Title	Role	Notes
1978	The Over-the-Rainbow Show	Witch	Kirribilli Pub Theatre, Sydney
1979	A Cheery Soul	Hire Car Man / Mrs Tole / Mr Bleeker	Sydney Opera House with The Paris Company & STC
1979	The Western Show	The Marshall	Kirribilli Pub Theatre, Sydney
1980	Inside the Island	Sgt Collins	Nimrod, Sydney
1980	Volpone	Anarogyno	Nimrod, Sydney
1991	The Government Inspector		Sydney Opera House with STC

=== As writer / director ===
Year	Title	Role	Notes
1979	The Jungle Show	Writer	Kirribilli Pub Theatre, Sydney, Lulu's Theatre Restaurant, Sydney
1980	The 1984 Show	Director	Kirribilli Pub Theatre, Sydney
1980; 1983	The Robin Hood Show	Playwright	Kirribilli Pub Theatre, Sydney, Singo's Restaurant, Sydney
1981–1982	The Private Eye Show	Devisor	Kirribilli Pub Theatre, Sydney, Roxy, Brighton-Le-Sands, Sydney
1981–1983	Little Red Riding Hood	Director / Playwright	Kirribilli Pub Theatre, Sydney, Parramatta Town Hall, Willoughby Civic Centre, Her Majesty's Theatre, Sydney with Liamington Productions
2001; 2003	Tivoli	Writer	State Theatre, Melbourne, Festival Theatre, Adelaide, Capitol Theatre, Sydney, Lyric Theatre, Brisbane, Canberra Theatre with The Australian Ballet and Sydney Dance Company
