= Julieanne Newbould =

Australian actress

- Occupation: Actress
- Years active: 1974–present
- Partner: Paul Keating (1999–2016)
- Children: 2

Julieanne Newbould is an Australian actress who came to prominence in the 1970s. She is known for playing Alison Clark in The Restless Years, Kate Ashton in the comedy series Daily at Dawn, Wendy Glover in Prisoner, and Dr. Virginia Travis in the serial E Street. In 2002, she had a recurring role in Home and Away as Jackie Turner. She also starred in the 2008 comedy drama The Cut as Roz Telford.

== Career ==
Newbould was 16 years old when she played Karen in the 1974 ABC telemovie Lindsay's Boy set during the Second World War. Late in the same year she appeared in the six-part comedy series The Rise and Fall of Wellington Boots, also on the ABC. Newbould was still attending school when she guested in several television series, including Division 4, Matlock Police and Homicide.

She then worked in several television series for the Grundy Organisation, and in 1977 played a guest role in the soap opera, The Young Doctors. Newbould was an original cast member of The Restless Years playing Alison Clark. Throughout her 18 months in the show, Newbould's character was raped, became a prostitute, and accused of murder. Newbould left The Restless Years in early 1979, and her character was killed off. Soon afterwards she took a role as reporter Kate Ashton in the Seven Network comedy series Daily at Dawn. She also appeared in Living with the Law.

She later played two roles in another Grundy series, Prisoner. She appeared first in 1982 as Hannah Simpson and then 1986 as Wendy Glover. In 1982, she also played Craig's girlfriend Wendy in an episode of Kingswood Country. The following year, she was part of the cast of the Melbourne Theatre Company's production of Ron Elisha's In Duty Bound at the Marian Street Theatre. She appeared in the 1984 television film Kindred Spirits.

Newbould was also a regular in the soap opera E Street. She first appeared in the serial in 1989 as a court lawyer, before joining the regular cast in 1991 as Dr. Virginia Travis, who was the first victim of "Mr Bad" in an infamous serial-killer storyline. She also had a guest role in The Flying Doctors.

In the 1990s, Newbould appeared in G.P. and the television film series Halifax f.p.. In 2001, she had a guest role in All Saints, followed by a stint in Home and Away as Jackie Turner. In 2008, she starred in the ABC comedy drama The Cut as Roz Telford. The following year, she made another appearance in All Saints.

Newbould's theatre credits include Tribute (Theatre Royal), Gypsy (Queensland Theatre Company) and On Our Selection (Nimrod).

== Personal life ==
In the early 1980s, the press linked Newbould romantically with television news reporter George Negus.

Newbould was married. She has two daughters.

Newbould was in a relationship with former Prime Minister of Australia Paul Keating from 1999 until 2016.

== Acting credits ==
=== Film ===
Year	Title	Role	Notes
1974	Lindsay's Boy	Karen	TV film
1977	Born to Run (aka Harness Fever)	Cathy Castle	Feature film
1977	Plunge Into Darkness		TV film
1979	Captives of Care	Robyn Bishop	TV film
1980	A Hard Deal		Film short
1981	Three Meetings		Film short
1983	The Schippan Mystery		TV film
1984	Kindred Spirits	Julie	TV film
2000	Halifax f.p.	Margaret Masters	TV film series, 1 episode: A Hate Worse Than Death

=== Television ===
Year	Title	Role	Notes
1974	Division 4	Carol Lane	TV series, 1 episode: All for One
1974	Matlock Police	Fay Parker, Carol Kelly, Christine Evans	TV series, 3 episodes: The Green Bull, Pot Luck, Deep Water
1974	Silent Number	Pam / Jane	TV series, 2 episodes: The Deep Dark Well, Unwanted
1975	Number 96	Theresa	Episode 869
1975	The Seven Ages of Man		TV series, 1 episode
1975	Shannon's Mob	Libby	TV series, 1 episode: Trip to Nowhere
1975	The Rise and Fall of Wellington Boots		TV series
1976	Homicide	Gail Perry	TV series, episode: Shark Pack
1976	Bluey	Sue Golding	TV series, episode 33: Final Devotion
1977	Graham Kennedy's Blankety Blanks	Panellist	TV series
1977	The Young Doctors	Glenda Stacey	TV series, 15 episodes
1977	Young Ramsay	Georgie Garrett	TV series, 1 episode: A Kid Is a Kid
1977–79	The Restless Years	Alison Clarke	TV series, 140 episodes
1978	Chopper Squad		TV series, 1 episode
1978	Loss of Innocence	Lesley	TV miniseries, 1 episode
1978	Run from the Morning		TV series
1979	Disneyland	Cathy Castle	TV series, 2 episodes
1980	1980 Annual TV Week Logie Awards	Herself - Audience member	TV Special
1980	Partners		TV series
1981	Daily at Dawn	Kate Ashton	TV series, 13 episodes
1981–1982, 1984	Kingswood Country	Wendy	TV series, 6 episodes (seasons 3–5)
1981	Cop Shop	Margaret Cook	TV series, 2 episodes
1981	A Sporting Chance		TV series, 1 episode
1981	Personality Squares	Herself	TV series, 1 episode
1982; 1986	Prisoner	Hannah Simpson / Wendy Glover	TV series, 25 episodes
1982	Holiday Island		TV series, 1 episode
1983	Carson's Law	Madeline Forbes	TV series, 2 episodes
1984	The Mike Walsh Show	Guest - Herself	TV series, 1 episode
1985	Blankety Blanks	Herself - Pannelist	TV series, 5 episodes
1985	For the Juniors	Herself	TV series
1988	Rafferty's Rules		TV series, 1 episode
1989, 1991	E Street	Lawyer Penny Hopkins	TV series, 2 episodes
1989	Living with the Law	Lawyer	TV series
1990	The Flying Doctors	Tracy Maguire	TV series, 1 episode: Dad's Little Bloke
1991	E Street	Virginia Travis	TV series, 49 episodes
1992, 1995	G.P.	Peggy Tassoni / Anne-Marie	TV series, 2 episodes: Breaking Out / So Like A Woman
1993	My Two Wives		TV series, 13 episodes
1997	Big Sky	Nicola Stanhope	TV series, 1 episode: Edge of Reality
2001	Farscape	Felor	TV series, 1 episode: Thanks for Sharing
2001, 2009	All Saints	Hannah Roach / Rita Morgan	TV series, 2 episodes: Close to Home, Behind Closed Doors 3
2002	Home and Away	Jackie Turner	TV series, 1 episode: 1.3250
2003	White Collar Blue	Daphne Mullins	TV series, 1 episode: 2.9
2008	The Cut	Roz Telford	TV miniseries, 6 episodes

=== Theatre ===
Year	Title	Role	Notes
1973	The Legend of King O'Malley		Richbrooke Theatre
1974	Hotel Paradiso		University of NSW, Parade Theatre
1975	Hotel Paradiso		Playhouse, Canberra
1976	The Season at Sarsaparilla	Judy Pogson	Sydney Opera House Drama Theatre
1979	Tribute	Sally Haynes	Theatre Royal & Newcastle Civic Theatre
1979	On Our Selection	Kate	Nimrod
1980	Gypsy	Louise	SGIO Theatre, Brisbane with QTC
1982	London Assurance	Grace Harkaway	Marian Street Theatre
1983	In Duty Bound		Marian Street Theatre
1988	Why Me?		Marian Street Theatre
