= Relative Merits =

- Written by: Lisa Benyon; Terry Larsen; Sara Dowse; Michael Cove; Jane Oehr
- Directed by: Colin Englert; Kate Woods; Peter Fisk; Karl Zwicky; Ron Elliott
- Starring: Odile Le Clezio; Brendan Higgins; Madeleine Blackwell
- Country of origin: Australia
- Original language: English
- No. of episodes: 10

Production
- Producer: Martin Williams

Original release
- Network: ABC
- Release: 15 June – 17 August 1987

Relative Merits is a 1987 mini series about three months in the life of a radio journalist. Due to new rules at the ABC the series was given a late night time slot which Robin Oliver from the Sydney Morning Herald said all but killed the series.

Louise Bellamy of The Age commenting of the first episode said "Unfortunately, their lives hold as much interest as Ken and Barbie doll. But it's early days" Also in the Age Barbara Hooks wrote "'Relative Merits' obviously has something worth saying, but the message may be lost if it proves too bitter a pill." Bronwyn Watson wrote in the Sydney Morning Herald that "Relative Merits is uneven, rather slow-moving in parts, but it has to be praised because at least it has the guts to tackle an up-to-date subject."
