= The Music Hall (Sydney theatre) =

- Interactive map of The Music Hall
- Location: Neutral Bay
- Coordinates: 33°49′51″S 151°13′15″E

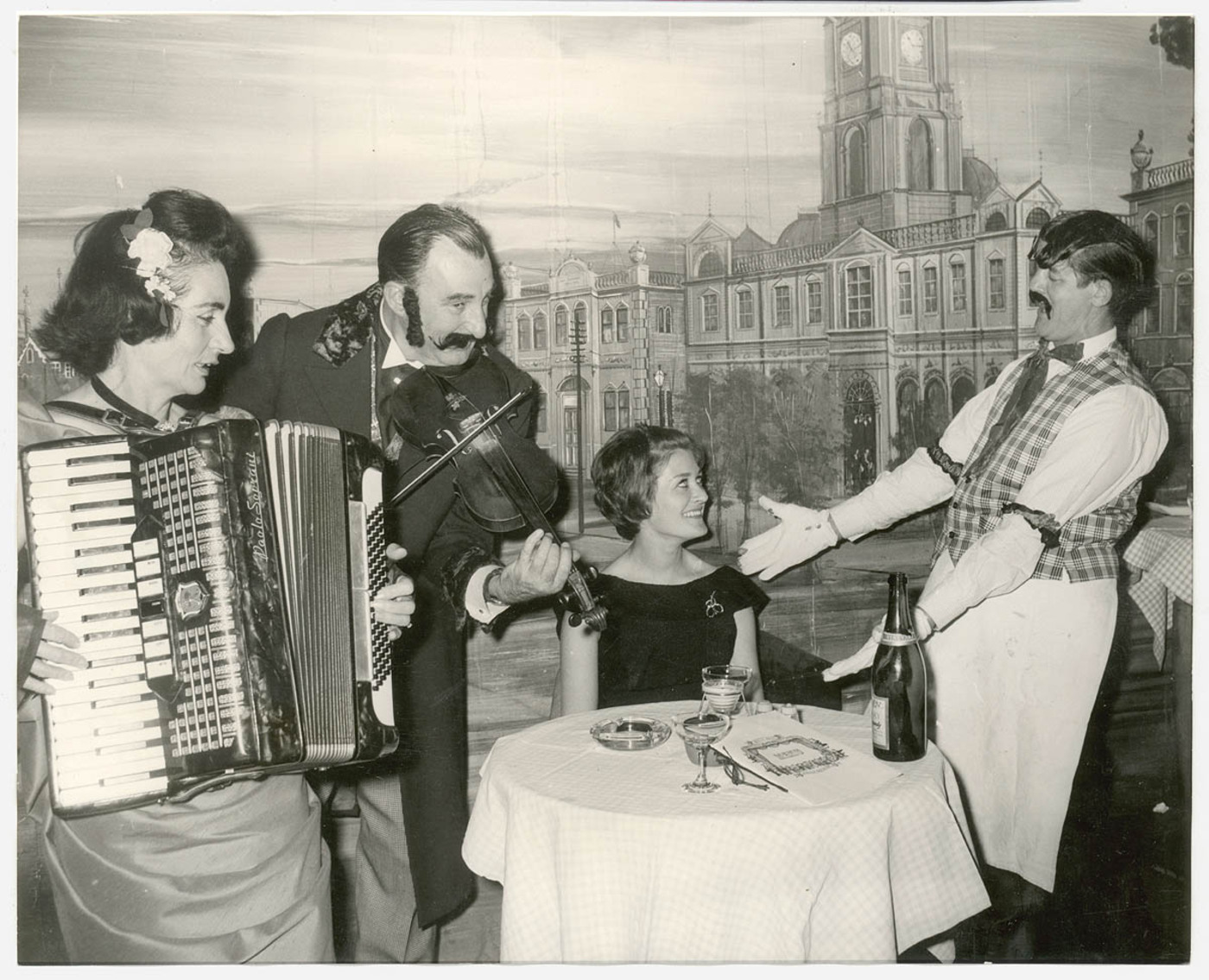
A patron being serenaded by the head waiter, with Mr and Mrs George Miller playing the violin and accordion respectively. Music Hall Theatre Restaurant, April 1965.

The Music Hall Theatre Restaurant was a popular entertainment venue located in the Sydney suburb of Neutral Bay, which operated from 1961 to 1980. Originally built in 1921, the building was formerly known as the Hoyts Southern Cross Cinema. The building was also used for a short period during the 1950s as a skating rink, prior to its conversion to a dinner theatre.

== Founding ==
Melbourne impresario George Miller, and his wife Lorna, opened the converted cinema at 156 Military Rd, Neutral Bay, in 1961. The stalls were replaced with dining tables, and the venue had an overall seating capacity of 500 patrons. The theatre also contained "The Handle Bar," upstairs in the former dress circle, where weekday luncheons were regularly held, and where patrons could enjoy a relaxed drink and "singalong" after the evening performances.

Actress Noeline Brown recalled that the Millers converted the venue into:

"a mock Victorian palace, with velvet drapes and tassels and over-decorated tables and chairs. Everyone wore Victorian costume, even the waiters and the box office staff. It was dinner with a comic take on melodrama and the audience warmed to the 'cheer the hero, hiss the villain' style of production. The format was an immediate success and quickly became a Sydney institution. The owners were closely involved in the running of the Music Hall and were present every night, warming up the audience as they dined by wandering around the theatre in frock coats or bustles and serenading the customers at their tables. George was a gifted violinist and his wife Lorna was also a talented musician."

== Productions ==
The Music Hall presented light-hearted melodramatic productions which recalled the days of Victorian music hall and vaudeville. Audience participation was a major feature, and the original poster for its debut production encouraged patrons to: "Hiss the villain, Weep with the Heroine and All join in the choruses."

The Music Hall's first production was a revival of one of the many stage adaptations of the famous 19th century sensation novel East Lynne by Ellen Wood. Subsequent productions included The Face at the Window, Lady Audley's Secret (another revived Victorian melodrama) and How the West was Lost, which was written by Barry Creyton. Creyton's production gathered the talents of actors such as Sheila Kennelly, Barry Lovett, Alan Dearth, and Des Rolfe, many of whom went on to appear in subsequent productions written and directed by John Faassen. Peter Pinne's The Magic of George Miller's Music Hall covers the history of this theatre in some depth.

In 1964, expatriate British actress-singer Carol Raye was working for TV station ATN-7 in Sydney, developing a pilot show for a new TV topical satire series which became The Mavis Bramston Show, the series that elevated Raye, Creyton and Gordon Chater to national stardom in Australia. Raye was taken to see the Music Hall's current show, The Evil That Men Do which co-starred Creyton and Noeline Brown and she was so impressed with Creyton's performance that she offered him a role in the TV pilot. Soon after, Brown met the show's co-producer, Michael Plant, at a party, and she was offered the role of the eponymous Mavis, which she performed for the first six shows of the series. Creyton's hiring for the Bramston show and its immediate success necessitated his replacement in How the West was Lost.

During 1963, Sydney actress Marcia Hathaway played the role of the second Mrs Carlisle in a revival of East Lynne. On Australia Day (26 January) that year, Ms Hathaway was fatally mauled by a shark while wading in shallow water at Sugarloaf Bay in Sydney's Middle Harbour.

== Closure ==
The Music Hall closed in 1980 due to fire safety issues and the building was demolished. The site is now occupied by a low-rise shop and office complex named East Lynne, after the first and final production at The Music Hall.
