= Curly on the Rack =

Play by Ru Pullan

- Original language: English
- Written by: Ru Pullan
- Subject: World War Two, money, New Guinea
- Genre: drama
- Setting: Papua New Guinea

Premiere
- Date: 3 September 1958
- Place: Elizabethan Theatre Trust, Newtown, Sydney
- Directed by: Nigel Lovell

Curly on the Rack is a 1958 Australian play by Ru Pullan set in Rabaul after World War II.

It was presented by the Elizabethan Theatre Trust at a time when production of Australian plays was rare. However the play was considered a critical and commercial disappointment after the Trust's previous two Australian dramas, The Shifting Heart and Summer of the Seventeenth Doll.

== Plot ==
After World War Two, two brothers, the tough Max and the gentler Harry, live in Rabaul with their sister Pet, salvaging wartime equipment. Their truck driver, Curly, waits for his opportunity to recover £10,000 he planted on a nearby island during the Japanese invasion along with a fellow soldier called Scobie.

Scobie arrives, having lost both his legs during the war, demanding his half of the money. Smith, a philosophical drunk, comments on the action.

== Cast of original production ==
- Stewart Ginn as Scobie
- John Gray as Smith
- Coralie Neville as Pet Finton
- Max Osbiston as Harry
- Grant Taylor as Max Finton
- Ken Wayne as Harry Finton
- Owen Weingott as Tim, a ship's captain

== Background ==
Pullan was an experienced radio writer. The play came about from a discussion he had with a friend about treasure left behind in New Guinea during the war.

== Reception ==
Ad in SMH 23 Aug 1958

Reviewing the original production, The Bulletin said "the dramatic cliches and tortuous contrivings that go with resolving the situations are rather less than bearable, and the scene wherein Scobie recovers his manhood and Max reveals his yellow streak must be one of the most preposterous bits of hoo-ha served to an audience for many a day."

The Sydney Morning Herald said the play "ran a wayward course through melodramatic shallows" and "had an entertaining enough adventure yarn to tell, but Mr Pullan seemed unable to develop the issues of his intriguing first act in a rich way through the stationary second, and then abandoned adventure to turn his third act into a much too rapid, much too tritely tremulous, much too improbable study of a wrecked man's redemption into full and confident manhood." The paper's reviewer added that the "dialogue had the surface fluency to be expected of an experienced hand in day-to-day radio writing, but the play...had something of radio's way of forcing over-heated dramatics into situations that could seem more plausible if allowed to generate more stealthily."

Bruce Grant of The Age felt the play was "undistinguished" with "some of the most predictable action ever seen on stage... it is very much a production of radio people... ordinary to the point of embarrassment". Grant later elaborated that the problem was not that the play fails to be distinguished but that "it fails to be an ordinary play."

Leslie Rees later called the play "an immediate failure... sloppily written, novelettish and second-rate. It played to empty houses and quickly lost over £5,000 for the Trust. Such a failure illustrated how easily managements that are supposed to be highly skilled in evaluating plays can make woeful mistakes." The Trust Annual Report confirmed the production lost £5,621.

Melbourne theatre critic listed this play along with Lola Montez and The Multi Coloured Umbrella as plays presented by the Trust that would have been more suitable to smaller theatres. Leslie Rees also argued that if the play had been trialled at a smaller venue its flaws may have been corrected.

== Radio adaptation ==
The play was adapted for Australian radio in 1960. Pullan adapted the play himself and the roles were played by John Ewart (Curly), Stewart Ginn (Scobie) and John Gray (Smith).
