= Knock on Any Door (TV series) =

British TV series (1965–1966)

Knock on Any Door is a British television anthology series which aired for two series in 1965–1966 (nine episodes in first series, eleven episodes in second series). The series was produced by Associated Television (ATV) and aired on ITV. All episodes of the series are intact.

== Cast ==
- Ted Willis, Baron Willis as Self - Introduction
- Brenda Bruce as Sarah Scoullar, Wife
- Helen Fraser as Madge Winter, Polly
- Ivor Dean as Arthur Dix, Jimmy
- Claire Marshall as Justine Prettyman, Sybil Pritchard
- Rosalind Atkinson as Miss Carmichael, Mrs. Stewart
- Priscilla Morgan as Myra Lampard, Janet Anderson
- Donald Morley as Dick
- Peter Sallis as Stannage
- June Watson as Doll
- James Appleby as Tenor
- Max Howard as Dave
- Ken Wayne as Stan Williams
