= Stan and George's New Life =

- Directed by: Brian McKenzie
- Starring: Paul Chubb
- Release date: 1992
- Country: Australia
- Language: English
- Box office: A$2,009 (Australia)

Stan and George's New Life is a 1992 Australian film directed by Brian McKenzie and starring Paul Chubb.

The Allmovie synopsis describes it thus:
Stan is a mild-mannered, gentle, middle-aged man who still lives with his overbearing parents. One day, acting on a suggestion by his father, he lands a job at the Weather Bureau. The work is challenging to him, and a little daunting, and his adjustment is considerably eased for him by his female co-worker "George," as she is called. The two become close, eventually marrying and moving in together. While they are adapting to the married state, conditions at work are deteriorating in a bizarre and irrational way, which puts a considerable strain on both the newlyweds.

McKenzie said he thought the resulting film was good, but not a strong story.

We tried very hard to make something out of it. I think it's a matter of having some sort of belief in your particular, not so much style, but presentation. It isn't so theatrical, and that runs through the performances, the editing style and the more classic sort of shots, style and the cast. So, in the end, if you can manage to imbue all the various parts with something that's fairly consistent, it can't be divided up or contaminated or corrupted. It's a complete thing. That's where I think that film has its worth. The script really lets the film down in the second half. It divides into two films, following a conspiracy thing. It doesn't really work. The focus on the odd couple in a workplace was working really well up until that point. Then the two elements fight each other for the rest of the film. Because of the delicate sort of storytelling and because it's slow, whatever action there is is really only in the climax. It doesn't particularly drive you along. It falls apart, I think, in the second half.

According to Ozmovies, "The film opened to mixed reviews, with some beguiled by the film’s gentle charms and others not so compelled."
