= Backsliding (film) =

- Directed by: Simon Target
- Starring: Tim Roth; Odile Le Clezio; Jim Holt
- Distributed by: Electric Pictures (UK)
- Release date: 1992
- Country: Australia
- Language: English
- Budget: A$2.3 million
- Box office: A$5,054 (Australia)

Backsliding is a 1992 Australian film starring Tim Roth.

== Cast ==
- Tim Roth as Tom Whitton
- Jim Holt as Jack Tyson
- Odile Le Clezio as Alison Tyson
- Ross McGregor as The Pastor
- Michelle Fillery as Jerry

== Plot ==
While in prison, Jack had two momentous experiences: he got religion, and met the woman who would become his wife. He and Alison are devoted to the idea of staying in God's good graces, so they have moved to a remote power station in central Australia, far from anywhere. Into this possibly idyllic arrangement comes a rootless young man who the power company has hired on to be the station's handyman. Tensions escalate between the men as their conflicting values rub up against one another

== Production ==
Documentary filmmaker Simon Target got the idea of making the film when he was stuck in a property in far west Queensland for two weeks waiting for the mail plane to take him home. The manager of the property took a dislike to his Englishness and chased him around with a rifle in a game he called "hunt the Pom".

The film was financed by the Australian Film Finance Corporation, Film Four International and Itel. The director was helped in raising funds by his brother, who worked in film finance in London. It was shot in South Australia with filming completed by December 1990.
