= Daily at Dawn =

Australian television sitcom (1981)

- Series title card
- Genre: Sitcom
- Written by: Gary Reilly; Tony Sattler
- Directed by: Kevin Burston
- Starring: Noeline Brown; Henri Szeps; Paul Chubb; Terry Bader; Julieanne Newbould; Robert Hughes; Theo Stephens
- Composer: Mike Perjanik
- Country of origin: Australia
- Original language: English
- No. of series: 1
- No. of episodes: 13

Production
- Producers: Gary Reilly; Tony Sattler
- Production locations: Sydney, Australia
- Camera setup: Multi-camera
- Running time: 30 minutes
- Production company: RS Productions

Original release
- Network: Seven Network
- Release: 1 February – 28 April 1981

Daily at Dawn is an Australian television sitcom that was first broadcast in 1981 on the Seven Network. The series was written and produced by Gary Reilly and Tony Sattler, who were also writers of popular Australian comedy series The Naked Vicar Show and Kingswood Country.

== Synopsis ==
The series was set in the office of a metropolitan morning newspaper called The Sun, and followed the lives of the journalists who worked there.

== Cast ==
- Noeline Brown as Phil Maguire
- Henri Szeps as Joe Parker
- Paul Chubb as Russell Ducke
- Terry Bader as Leslie Windrush
- Julieanne Newbould as Kate Ashton
- Robert Hughes as Gil James
- Theo Stephens as Danny Mason

== Production ==
=== Development ===
Writer Tony Sattler claimed that the series "grew out of the contact [he and writing partner Gary Reilly] had with journalists, and the characters are based on facets of journos we've met". The series was created at the same time as Reilly and Sattler were writing and producing Kingswood Country (1980–1984). Reilly and Sattler wrote one script per show each week, in addition to producing and editing both series. Julieanne Newbould believed that the series was negatively affected as a result, claiming that "that sort of thing shows up in the finished product". She stated that "the next series [...] will be a great improvement" as it "will have their full attention". Little was revealed about the series before its launch. For research, the writers studied the John Fairfax and Sons office in Broadway, Sydney.

Each episode was recorded twice before a live studio audience. The two recordings were then edited into one recording, using the best audience reaction from each recording.

=== Casting ===
Paul Chubb, who portrays Russell Ducke in the series, had originally approached writers Reilly and Sattler for a writing job on the series; the writers remembered he also had acting experience and cast Chubb in the role. Reilly and Sattler had seen Theo Stephens in a commercial. The writers did not initially consider Julieanne Newbould for a comedy role; she was cast after Noeline Brown, Sattler's wife, who portrays Phil Maguire, recommended her. Brown was offered the role of Maguire by Reilly. Terry Bader was cast as Leslie Windrush, the first regular gay character to be featured in an Australian comedy series.

== Episodes ==
| No. | Title | Directed by | Written by | Original release date |
|---|---|---|---|---|
| 1 | "Whatever Happened to Glad's Dredgly?" | Kevin Burston | Gary Reilly and Tony Sattler | 1981 |
| 2 | "The Russians Are Coming, the Russians Are Coming" | Kevin Burston | Gary Reilly and Tony Sattler | 1981 |
| 3 | "Where There's Smoke There's Duckie" | Kevin Burston | Gary Reilly and Tony Sattler | 1981 |
| 4 | "My Favourite Nightmares" | Kevin Burston | Gary Reilly and Tony Sattler | 1981 |
| 5 | "Up the Famous Creek Without a Cyclone" | Kevin Burston | Gary Reilly and Tony Sattler | 1981 |
| 6 | "Robert Mitchum Meets the Queen" | Kevin Burston | Gary Reilly and Tony Sattler | 1981 |
| 7 | "Days of Wine and Tuckerbox" | Kevin Burston | Gary Reilly and Tony Sattler | 1981 |
| 8 | "Never Look a Gift Snake in the Mouth" | Kevin Burston | Gary Reilly and Tony Sattler | 1981 |
| 9 | "Tax Free Prophet" | Kevin Burston | Gary Reilly and Tony Sattler | 1981 |
| 10 | "It's My Party and I'll Flake If I Want to" | Kevin Burston | Gary Reilly and Tony Sattler | 1981 |
| 11 | "The Spy Who Came Into the Sun" | Kevin Burston | Gary Reilly and Tony Sattler | 1981 |
| 12 | "A Grave Party" | Kevin Burston | Gary Reilly and Tony Sattler | 1981 |
| 13 | "Guess Whose Son's in a Whirlpool" | Kevin Burston | Gary Reilly and Tony Sattler | 1981 |

== Broadcast ==
The series premiered on 1 February 1981 at 8:00 pm on ATN 7. Before the first series had aired in 1981, a second series of thirteen episodes was ordered for later in the year. However, by June 1981, the second series had been cancelled. In April 1982, it was rumoured that the series would be revived, however, Sattler denied these claims.

In February 1981, the series was proposed for screening in Canberra, but was rejected by the CTC-TV station. In 1987, the series was repeated in Brisbane on BTQ-7. It was also repeated from 19 July to 10 October 1994 at 11:35 pm on the 7 Network.

== Reception ==
The series received criticism from Sydney journalists and Australian scriptwriters, who claimed the show to be of a poor standard compared to Reilly and Sattler's earlier television series, The Naked Vicar Show (1977–1978). The series was described as being "played with the familiar Reilly/Sattler fever-pitch, comic pace". Paul Chubb's portrayal of Russell Ducke was highly praised, described as being "one of the best things" about the series, and as the show's "one saving grace".

Ian Rolph, writing for The Australian Women's Weekly, described the series as "drivel", stating that it contained "all the humour of an In Memoriam section". Rolph was critical of the Sydney newspaper The Sun's involvement with the series (the show's characters worked for a fictional newspaper also called The Sun), noting the large amount of ads promoting The Sun and its sister paper The Sydney Morning Herald, as well as Channel 7 Sydney's connections to the paper, stating that "it beats me why any newspaper would want to be associated with this mirthless muck-heap". Similarly, Cal Cullen, writing for the same magazine, called the series "dreadful" and "a disastrous attempt at TV comedy"; however, he praised the show's casting. Television writer Albert Moran, in Moran's Guide to Australian TV Series (1993), wrote that the series, in contrast to the writers's earlier sitcom Kingswood Country, "had too many characters who were not sufficiently distinguished as types from each other, and too many normal types".
