= Ken Wayne =

Australian actor (1922–1993)

Ken Wayne AM
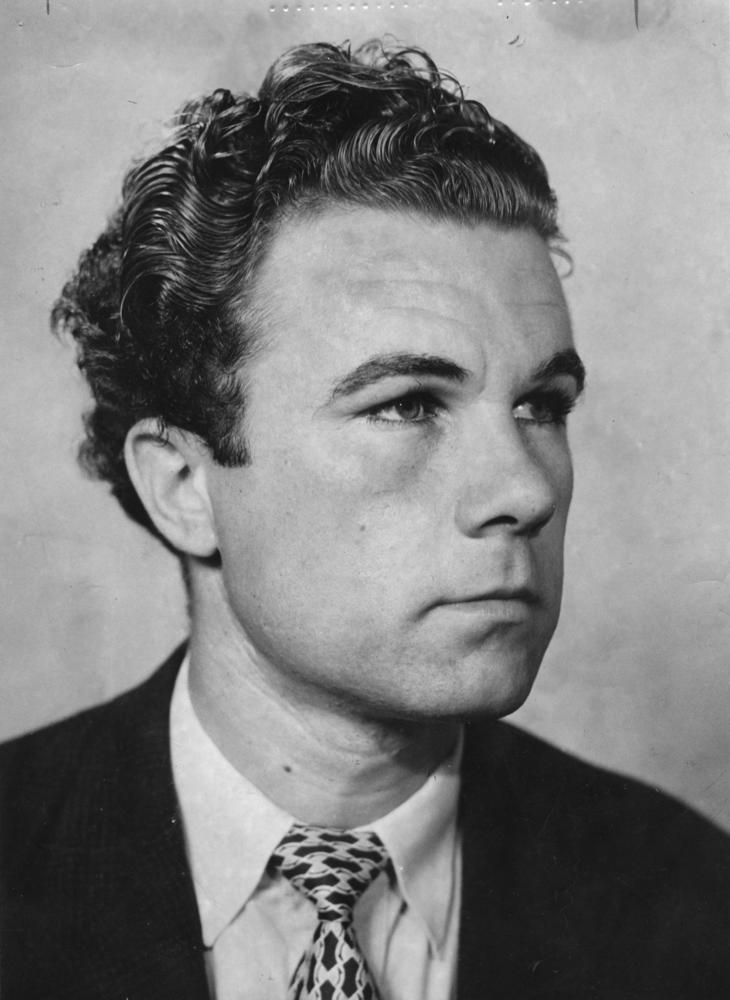
- Ken Wayne in 1947
- Born: Kenard Charles Wayne; 5 October 1922; Sydney, New South Wales, Australia
- Died: 30 September 1993 (aged 70); Epping, New South Wales, Australia
- Occupation: Actor
- Years active: 1945–1992

Kenard Charles Wayne (5 October 1922 – 30 September 1993) was an Australian actor.

== Career ==
Wayne made his film debut in Sons of Matthew (1949) and appeared in a number of movies including Dust in the Sun (1958). Wayne had a featured role as a submarine officer using an American accent in 1959's On the Beach filmed in Melbourne.

He also worked in radio and was best known for his role as private eye Larry Kent in the series I Hate Crime. Wayne auditioned for the part of Larry Kent, after the first choice for the lead felt through. He played him for all three seasons. According to colleague and friend Charles Tingwell, being so identified with Larry Kent hurt Wayne from being cast in other roles.

Wayne relocated to Britain in the early 1960s where he worked in London for 13 years, appearing in series such as The Saint, No Hiding Place, Dixon of Dock Green and Coronation Street.

He returned to Australia in 1972 to become a regular guest artist on television movies and series, including the miniseries Serpent in the Rainbow (1973) and Power Without Glory (1976), police procedural series Homicide and Matlock Police, sitcom Doctor Down Under and soap operas Punishment, A Country Practice and E Street, continuing to act until the early 1990s. He also had a minor role as a bartender in the 1989 American film The Punisher, which was filmed in Australia.

On stage in Australia, Wayne appeared in productions of These Positions Vacant (1945), Get a Load of This (1945), Ah, Wilderness! (1948), The Big Knife (1957), Curly on the Rack (1958) and That Championship Season (1974). His stage credits in the UK included Happy as a King (1953), Licence to Murder (1963), Twelve Angry Men (1963–1964) and The Odd Couple (1966–1967).

== Filmography ==
=== Film ===
Year	Title	Role	Notes
1950	Sons of Matthew	Barney O'Riordan	
1957	Three in One	First Cab Driver	Anthology film, segment "The City"
1958	Dust in the Sun	Justin Bayard	
1958	Double Cross		Short film
1959	On the Beach	Lt. Benson	
1962	Two and Two Make Six	Maj. Calhoun	
1962	Solo for Sparrow	Baker	
1963	The Small World of Sammy Lee	Barman	
1963	On the Run	Bryce	
1965	Up from the Beach	Pfc. Solly	
1965	The Liquidator	Tank Crewman (uncredited)	
1967	The Dirty Dozen	Master Sgt. Fredericks (uncredited)	
1968	Nobody Runs Forever	Ferguson	
1973	The Mackintosh Man	Uncredited	
1977	Alibis	Harry	
1982	Brothers	Bureau Chief	
1986	Death of a Soldier	Captain Burman	
1989	The Punisher	Bartender	

=== Television ===
Year	Title	Role	Notes
1955	The Adventures of Long John Silver	Gil Bligh	1 episode
1958	The Multi-Coloured Umbrella	Joe	TV play
1960	Deadline Midnight	Binnie	1 episode
1960–1965	ITV Play of the Week	Digger / Mr Warner / Norton / Defence Attorney Stevens	TV plays, 4 episodes
1961	One Step Beyond	Guard	Episode: "The Stranger"
1961	The Guns of Navarone	Soldier (uncredited)	
1961; 1962	Armchair Theatre	Parkes / Vice-president	2 episodes
1962	Reunion Day	Jack Hudson	TV movie
1962	Out of This World	Jason Kemper	1 episode
1962	The Saint	Gilroy	Episode: "The Element of Doubt"
1962; 1963	The Edgar Wallace Mystery Theatre	Bryce / Baker	2 episodes
1963	Richard the Lionheart	Auctioneer	1 episode
1963	No Hiding Place	Henderson	Episode: "Four Faces of Clare"
1963	The Plane Makers	Bluey Peters	Episode: "Any More for the Skylark?"
1965	The Wednesday Play	Gingo / Prisoner in Black Maria / Staff Cross	TV plays, 3 episodes
1964; 1965	Dixon of Dock Green	Frank Price / Bert Bridges	2 episodes
1966	Knock on Any Door	Stan Williams	1 episode
1969	Coronation Street	Barman	1 episode
1970	ITV Saturday Night Theatre	Col Ulysses S. Feather	Episode: "Lay Down Your Arms"
1970	Mogul	Edward Johnson	Episode: "Who Did You Say Inherits the Earth?"
1972	Boney	Charlie	1 episode
1973	The Adventurer	Director	1 episode
1973	Division 4	Inspector Crane	1 episode
1973	Serpent in the Rainbow		4 episodes
1973; 1975	Homicide	Sgt Tom Taylor / Geoffrey Thompson	2 episodes
1974	Lindsay's Boy		TV movie
1975	Certain Women		1 episode
1973; 1975	Matlock Police	Reg Logan / Chilla Davis / Bruce Johnston / Frank Nash	4 episodes
1976	Silent Number	Simpson	1 episode
1976	The Professional Touch		TV movie
1976	The Bushranger		TV movie
1976	The Sullivans	Army Sergeant	1 episode
1976	Power without Glory	Ted Thurgood	Miniseries, 5 episodes
1978	Father, Dear Father in Australia	Sgt Ryan	1 episode
1978–1982	Cop Shop	Rod Willis / Taverner / Doug Freeman	6 episodes
1979	Doctor Down Under	Professor Wilkinson	3 episodes
1981	Punishment	CPO Jack Hudson	
1982	A Country Practice	Merv Jeffreys	2 episodes
1982	Deadline	Fire Officer	TV movie
1983	Sherlock Holmes and a Study in Scarlet	Voice	Animated film
1984	The Dismissal	Liberal Senator	Miniseries, 2 episodes
1984	A Tale of Two Cities	Voice	Animated film
1984	Special Squad	Ted Baker	Episode 7: "The Second Mr. Swift"
1986	Charley's Web	Richard Wilson	TV movie
1988	Rafferty's Rules	Henry Plummer	1 episode
1989	E Street	Wolfgang Weissman	1 episode
1992	G.P.	Curly	1 episode

== Theatre ==
Year	Title	Role	Notes
1945	These Positions Vacant		Independent Theatre, Sydney
1945	Get a Load of This		Tivoli Theatre, Sydney
1948	Ah, Wilderness!		Minerva Theatre, Sydney
1953	Happy as a King	Dancer	Princes Theatre, London, Grand Theatre, Blackpool
1957	The Big Knife		Independent Theatre, Sydney
1958	Curly on the Rack	Harry Finton	Elizabethan Theatre, Sydney
1963	Licence to Murder	Lieutenant O'Brien	Golders Green Hippodrome, London, Vaudeville Theatre, London
1963–1964	Twelve Angry Men		Queen's Theatre, London
1966–1967	The Odd Couple	Oscar Madison (replacement) / Speed	Theatre Royal, Brighton, Golders Green Hippodrome, London, Opera House, Manchester, Grand Theatre & Opera House, Leeds, Queen's Theatre, London
1974	That Championship Season		UNSW Old Tote Parade Theatre, Sydney

== Radio (partial) ==
Year	Title	Role	Notes
1946–1947	The Clock		Radio series
1950–1952	I Hate Crime	Larry Kent	Radio series
