= Silent Number (TV series) =

Australian television series

Silent Number is an Australian TV series about a police doctor played by Grigor Taylor. It was created by Ron McLean. It aired from 1974 to 1975.

== Cast ==
=== Main ===
- Grigor Taylor as Steve Hamilton
- Elizabeth Alexander as Jean Hamilton
- Deryck Barnes as Sergeant Gill Gilbert
- Rosalind Speirs as Pat Casey / Janet
- Anthony Wager as Dr Gordon Johnson
- Don Reid as Dr Wills

=== Recurring / guests ===
Actor	Role	Ep. count
Anne Haddy	Claire Armstrong	1
Arna-Maria Winchester	Leah	1
Benita Collings	Mary	1
Berys Marsh	Barbara	2
Bob Maza	Alec	1
Brian Moll	Prison Doctor	1
Chantal Contouri	Marie	1
Christine McCourt		1
Cornelia Frances	Ivy	1
Deborah Kennedy		1
Dina Mann	Sharon Lane	1
Dennis Miller	Byron	1
Dina Mann	Sharon Lane	1
Edmund Pegge	Richard	1
Frank Gallacher	Barney	1
Freda Leslie	Cara	5
Gillian Jones		1
Harold Hopkins	Brendon	1
Jacki Weaver	Anne	1
Jeanie Drynan	Denise	1
Jennifer Cluff	Jodie	1
Jill Forster	Prostitute	1
John Ewart	Burton	1
John Fegan	Deadbeat	1
John Frawley	Osborne	1
John Hargreaves	Terry Lucas	1
John Stanton	Mason / Singer	2
Judy Lynne	Tessie / Cecelia	1
Julieanne Newbould	Pam / Jane	2
Ken Wayne	Simpson	1
Kerry McGuire	Clare Milson	1
Kevin Miles	McGillrae / Hacking	2
Lorraine Bayly	Jackson	1
Lyndel Rowe	Sharon	1
Maggie Dence	Nurse Janet Kay	1
Martin Vaughan	Winslow	1
Max Cullen	Cohen	1
Max Osbiston		1
Melissa Jaffer	Thelma	1
Michael Beecher		
Neva Carr-Glynn	Mrs Bradley	1
Noeline Brown	Mrs Dalton	1
Norman Yemm	Miller / Morgan	2
Paul Chubb	Constable / Graham Clay	2
Peter Sumner	Clifton / Ted Grant	2
Rebecca Gilling	Futility Cragg	1
Redmond Phillips	Freddie	1
Robin Tolhurst	Policewoman	6
Roger Ward	Dan Lane	2
Ron Haddrick	John Stanford	1
Rowena Wallace	Sylvia Marsh	1
Sean Scully	Paul	1
Slim DeGrey	Kevin Donellan	1
Terry Camilleri	Lewis	1
Tina Bursill	Annette	1
Tom Oliver	Stanton	1
Tommy Dysart	Sand	1
Vincent Ball	White / Norris	3
