= Barley Charlie =

Australian television sitcom

- Genre: Sitcom
- Created by: Ronald Chesney; Ronald Wolfe
- Written by: Ronald Chesney; Ronald Wolfe; Alan Hopgood
- Directed by: Rod Kinnear
- Starring: Edward Hepple; Robina Beard; Sheila Bradley; Stewart Weller
- Theme music composer: Bruce Clark
- Country of origin: Australia
- Original language: English
- No. of series: 1
- No. of episodes: 13 (10 missing)

Production
- Producer: Rod Kinnear
- Camera setup: Multi-camera
- Running time: 30 minutes

Original release
- Network: GTV-9
- Release: 31 March – 23 June 1964

Barley Charlie is an Australian television sitcom which aired in 1964. It was the second television sitcom produced in Australia; being preceded by the 1957–1959 series Take That, although that Crawford Productions sitcom had only aired in Melbourne. Some of the creatives went on to be involved in the serial drama Undercurrent (1965).

== Overview ==
Barley Charlie aired for 13 episodes, produced by GTV-9 and also shown on other stations across Australia. Though short-lived, the series was a ratings success. The main cast were Sheila Bradley, Robina Beard, and Edward Hepple.

The National Film and Sound Archive hold at least four episodes of Barley Charlie as well as some documentation.

== Cast ==
=== Main ===
- Edward Hepple as Charlie Appleby
- Robina Beard as Shirley Muggleton
- Sheila Bradley as Joan Muggleton
- Stewart Weller as Stinger

=== Guests ===
- George Whaley (1 episode)
- Joe McCormick as Harrison Blake, Jr (1 episode)
- Michael Duffield as Inspector (1 episode)
- Terry Norris as Herb (1 episode)
- Wynn Roberts as Jim Fogarty (1 episode)

== Premise ==
The premise was developed by the British scriptwriting team of Ronald Chesney and Ronald Wolfe while they were visiting Australia in the wake of the worldwide success of The Rag Trade.

Joan and Shirley Muggleton are two cityslicker sisters who inherit a roadhouse café and garage midway between Melbourne and Sydney. Working there is Charlie Appleby, a lazy and clueless mechanic.

== Episodes ==
All episodes were produced and directed by Rod Kinnear. The first six episodes were written by Ronald Wolfe and Ronald Chesney and adapted for Australian audiences by Alan Hopgood; the remaining seven were written solely by Hopgood. The series was first broadcast in Melbourne; selected episodes were later broadcast for the first time in Adelaide.

No.	Title	Written by	Original release date
1	"The Double Take"	Ronald Chesney and Ronald Wolfe	31 March 1964
2	"The Big Fix"	Ronald Chesney and Ronald Wolfe	7 April 1964
Also aired in Adelaide on 17 August 1964.
3	"A Quid Each Way, Every Way"	Ronald Chesney and Ronald Wolfe	14 April 1964
4	"The Inspector Calls"	Ronald Chesney and Ronald Wolfe	21 April 1964
5	"Petticoat Prison"	Ronald Chesney and Ronald Wolfe	28 April 1964
Also aired in Adelaide on 7 September 1964.
6	"Hygiene Hi-Jack"	Ronald Chesney and Ronald Wolfe	5 May 1964
Also aired in Adelaide on 14 September 1964.
7	"Home Sweet Brew"	Alan Hopgood	12 May 1964
Also aired in Adelaide on 21 September 1964.
8	"Hot Lines"	Alan Hopgood	19 May 1964
Also aired in Adelaide on 28 September 1964.
9	"Cawler's Ghost"	Alan Hopgood	26 May 1964
Also aired in Adelaide on 5 October 1964.
10	"Bad Nose for Charlie"	Alan Hopgood	2 June 1964
11	"Colonel Blood"	Alan Hopgood	9 June 1964
12	"Frenzy Persuasion"	Alan Hopgood	16 June 1964
Also aired in Adelaide on 26 October 1964.
13	"A Candle for Charlie"	Alan Hopgood	23 June 1964
Also aired in Adelaide on 2 November 1964.
