= Mister Gallagher and Mister Shean =

Comedic vaudeville song from the early 20th century

"Mister Gallagher and Mister Sheen"
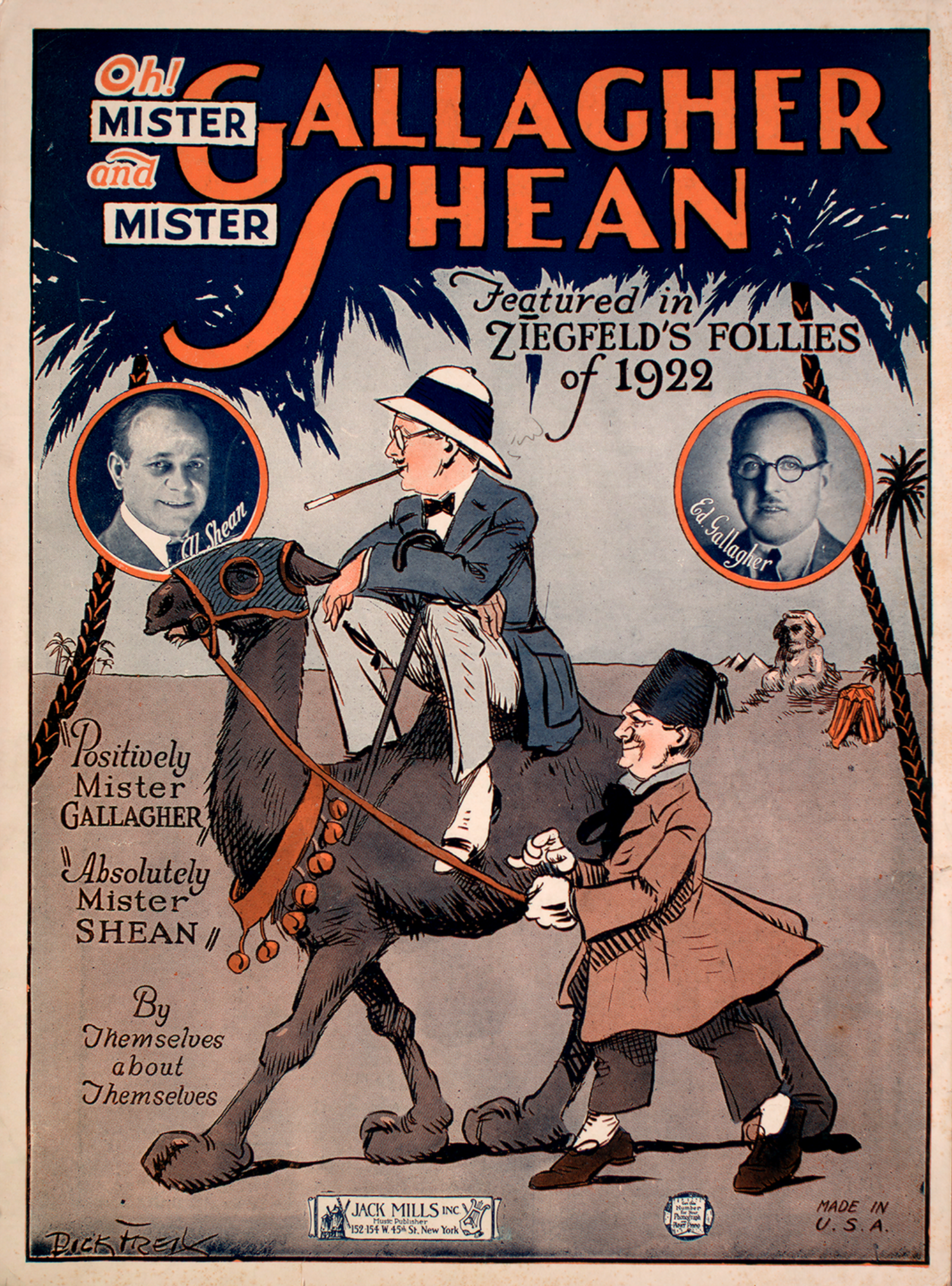

Song by Ed Gallagher, Al Shean
- Songwriters: Ed Gallagher, Al Shean

Audio sample
- Recording of Positively, Mr. Gallagher?, performed by Gallagher and Sheen (1922): file; help

"Mister Gallagher and Mister Shean" is one of the most famous songs to come from vaudeville. First performed by the duo of Gallagher and Shean in the early 1920s, it became a huge hit and carried Gallagher & Shean to stardom. The music was written by Shean, while Bryan Foy (uncredited) wrote the lyrics. The sheet music credits Gallagher and Shean as writers. The song is also sometimes known as "Absolutely, Mr. Gallagher? Positively, Mr. Shean!."

It contains jokes typical of the time but also lampoons current fads and events ("Cost of living went so high / That it's cheaper now to die"). The song itself gave rise to many parody versions.

As this song was sung on the vaudeville stage, each verse was presented as a miniature skit, as though Shean came across Gallagher on a street, beginning: "Oh, Mister Gallagher! Oh Mister Gallagher! Have you heard...?" Gallagher would say "Yes, yes" to his entreaties before the joke was set up in the verse.

Because the duo's first appearance together had been in a skit set in Egypt, the two performed the song in Egyptian costume (Gallagher wearing either a straw hat or a solar topee, Shean in fez and bizarre skirted jacket of the "native" colonial). Aside from one reference to the Nile made in one of the original verses, their costumes had nothing to do with the song, but reflected the craze for all things Egyptian after the discovery of King Tut's tomb.

Each verse ended with a question-and-answer refrain, one of which – "Positively, Mister Gallagher? Absolutely, Mister Shean!" – became a well-known catchphrase for many years thereafter.

Probably the most successful revival of the song was the version recorded by Bing Crosby and Johnny Mercer for Decca Records on July 1, 1938 which had special lyrics by Mercer. Sub-titled "Mr. Crosby and Mr. Mercer" this reached No. 7 in the charts of the day. A version was performed on television by Groucho Marx (Shean's nephew) with Jackie Gleason in the 1960s, and Lenny Bruce made off-handed reference to it in his 1960s nightclub act, all of them confident that it would be immediately recognizable to the audience.

The song is recreated in the film Ziegfeld Girl (1941), by Shean (in a cameo role as himself) together with Charles Winninger (playing a fictitious version of Gallagher).

In 1966, Dean Martin and Phil Harris performed a version of the song on The Dean Martin Show.

In the 1974 play Travesties, by Tom Stoppard, the characters Gwendolen and Cecily sing a parody version of the song, substituting their own names. As late as 1983, the song was the centerpiece of an advertising campaign by the Pitney-Bowes corporation ("Absolutely, Mister Pitney? Positively, Mister Bowes!").

There are several versions of the song, and a long list of verses, as it was occasionally reworked or updated, as was typical of topical vaudeville songs. It was recorded both on a popular 78 rpm disc record and on an early "talkie" film, both of which featured the original performers. The song is heard in the soundtrack of the feature film Atlantic City (1944).

Jerry Herman linked this song to his creation "Bosom Buddies" for the musical Mame, referring to the common technique of "rhyme pattern that sounds like dialogue but is actually lyric". This song inspired at least the jingle associated with the household cleaning product Mr. Sheen; whether it directly inspired the product name is unknown.
