= Hunger (1986 film) =

1986 Australian television film

- Written by: Louis Nowra
- Directed by: Stephen Wallace
- Starring: Brendan Higgins; Melita Jurisic
- Music by: Nathan Waks
- Country of origin: Australia
- Original language: English

Production
- Producer: Jan Chapman
- Cinematography: Julian Penney
- Editor: William Russo
- Running time: 90 mins
- Production company: ABC

Original release
- Network: ABC
- Release: 10 October 1986

Hunger is a 1986 Australian TV film about a Romanian refugee who settles in Australia.

== Plot summary ==
The film follows a young man who leaves communist Romania and begins a new life in Australia. When his efforts to bring his wife to Australia fail, he stages a hunger strike in an attempt to pressure the authorities into allowing her to join him.

== Cast ==
- Brendan Higgins as Michael Radulesco
- Melita Jurisic as Ileana Radulesco
- Paul Chubb as Caffrey
- Cathy Downes as Sue Saunders
- John Bell as Romanian Consul
- Briony Behets as Mrs. Levey

== Production ==
Louis Nowra wrote the film for Jan Chapman following their successful collaboration on Displaced Persons. He says the subject matter was close to Chapman's heart, and the producer thought it would be a romantic story. However, the more research Nowra did, the less romantic he felt the story was and he had a deal of trouble writing it as a love story. He felt swamped with the research and did not like the real-life men on whom the story was based. Nowra was not satisfied with the final script, although he said the director did the best he could. Nowra also plays a support role.

== Reception ==
Anna Murdoch of the Age writes "HUNGER, the telemovie written by Louis Nowra, never realises its promise as powerful drama. It should have done so, for the subject is powerful - a young Romanian on a hunger strike to get his wife out to Australia." In the Sydney Morning Herald Chris Purcell says "Hunger is a very good film. Higgins and Jurisic play their roles with plenty of style, working with a strong supporting cast that includes John Bell and Briony Behets." Mark Mordue, also in the Sydney Morning Herald, states "Hunger is another significant triumph in this Jan Chapman-produced series of Australian telemovies." A capsual review in the same masthead gives it two stars (out of 4) calling it "Another quality ABC telemovie."
