= RS Productions =

- Logo used from 1980 to c.1983
- Industry: Radio and television production
- Genre: Sitcoms
- Founders: Gary Reilly; Tony Sattler
- Defunct: 1984
- Fate: Ceased production; now exists merely as a copyright holder
- Headquarters: Australia
- Products: The Naked Vicar Show; Kingswood Country; Daily at Dawn; Brass Monkeys; Bullpitt!

RS Productions was an Australian television and radio production company best known for producing the television sitcom Kingswood Country (1980–1984). The company was founded by Gary Reilly and Tony Sattler, originally to produce comic sketches such as The Novels of Fiona Wintergreen and "anti-ads" (satirical advertisements for fictitious company Product Name) for ABC youth radio 2JJ and for its "Local Radio" network. Titles included Chuck Chunder of the Space Patrol (1975), Doctors and Nurses (1976) and The Naked Vicar Show (1976–77), for which a compilation of highlights is available on cassette tape.

The Naked Vicar Show was later adapted for television and broadcast by Channel Seven from 1977 to 1978. One of its regular sketches became the basis for the hit sitcom Kingswood Country. Other television series produced by the company included Daily at Dawn (1981), Brass Monkeys (1984) and Bullpitt! (1997–1998). The company also produced several radio programmes. Today the company still exists as the copyright holder of its programs, two of which, Kingswood Country and Bullpitt!, have since been released on DVD.

The company ceased production in 1984.

== See also ==
- Australian television
