= Captives of Care =

- Based on: Captives of Care by John Roarty
- Written by: Don Catchlove; Chris Peacock
- Directed by: Stephen Wallace
- Starring: Julieanne Newbould
- Music by: Sarah de Jong
- Country of origin: Australia
- Original language: English

Production
- Producer: Don Catchlove
- Cinematography: Paul Tait
- Editor: Trevor Ellis
- Running time: 48 mins
- Production company: ABC

Original release
- Network: ABC
- Release: 1981

Captives of Care is 1981 short film based on a book by John Roarty. It won the 1981 AFI Award for Best Short Fiction Film. It was made to coincide with the Year of the Disabled. It is set in a rehabilitation hospital for the disabled. The film features some of the disabled people from Roarty's story playing themselves.

== Plot ==
Nurse Robin Bishop starts working at a home for the severely disabled where patients are fighting for change.

== Cast ==
- Julieanne Newbould as Robyn Bishop
- Pat Thomson as Matron
- Kay Taylor as Sister Blayney
- Phillip Hinton as Mr Jenner
- Tony Ward as Tony Ward
- John Roarty as John Roarty
- Jeannie Best as Jeannie Best
- Neil Russ as Neil Russ

== Reception ==
The Sun-Herald's Claire Tedeschi said "The messages in Captives of Care aren't new but the way they've certainly been expresses certainly are. The impact the film lies in the courage of the cast." Kate Legge in the Age's Green Guide wrote "Captives of Care is a sensitive and dramatic account of [the patients] successful flight for reform." The Age's Brian Courtis says "The initial impression from 'Captives Of Care' is one of great shock. Then, inexplicably, guilt, Then, confusion. To avert the eyes, to switch off, or not?" adding "The more you feel that first discomfort, the more, I believe, you will appreciate what producer Don Catchlove and director Stephen Wallace have done in this conscience - stabbing dramatised documentary about disabled people."
