= Odile Le Clezio =

Australian actress

- Occupation: Actress
- Years active: 1979-
- Notable work: Young Einstein; Backsliding; Relative Merits

Odile Le Clezio is an Australian actress who was born in Mauritius. She is a NIDA graduate who had lead roles in the films Young Einstein and Backsliding and the ABC mini series Relative Merits. She played the titular character in the Lottie Lyell episode of Australians.

Le Clezio has a long stage career that includes The Crucible (NIDA Parade Theatre, 1982), The Cherry Orchard (Sydney Opera House, 1983), The Dance of Death (The Wharf, 1985), Catholic Schoolgirls (touring, 1989), Angels in America (The Wharf Theatre, 1993), Third World Blues (Sydney Opera House, 1997) and The Merchant of Venice (various, 1999)
