= Bullpitt! =

Television series

Bullpitt! is a short-lived Australian television comedy series which screened in 1997 to 1998 on the Seven Network, reprising the main character in the 1980s sitcom Kingswood Country. It was written by Gary Reilly and Tony Sattler.

Bullpitt! saw the return of the character Ted Bullpitt, portrayed by (Ross Higgins) who is now single and retired, living in a retirement home. He is still complaining and repeating many of his catchphrases from Kingswood Country such as "Pickle me grandmother!" and "Money on the fridge". Also in the cast Elaine Lee, Peter Whitford, Bruce Spence, Vanessa Downing, Jacqueline Brennan and Kirstie Hutton as Ted's university student granddaughter Tessa "Terri" Bertolucci (who Ted initially only recognises after she tells him her father's name is "The Wog"). The series, like its predecessor, featured many well-known Australian actors in guest cameo roles. It was produced by RS Productions.

In 1998, the show was nominated at the Logies for Most Popular Comedy program. However it lost to sketch comedy Full Frontal.

13 of the 26 episodes of the show have been released on DVD under the title The Best of Bullpitt! Volume 1.

In 2023 Via Vision Entertainment released the entire series on DVD.

== Cast ==
=== Main/regular ===
- Ross Higgins as Edward Melba "Ted" Bullpitt – Now single, retired and living at the Whispering Pines Retirement Village. Still drives his beloved Kingswood while Neville the concrete Aboriginal resides in his front garden, much to the chagrin of the other village residents. Its implied that he tortures Madge Burrows' (another resident) cat by doing things like putting it in a dryer, throwing it in the pool or stuffing it into the village gymnasium's punching bag, though he denies it by saying a new catchphrase "Wasn't me. I love that bloody cat". Ted has the heads of his old Greyhound racing dogs Gay Akubra and Repco Lad mounted on his wall (they died of natural causes, but Ted shouldn't have bought that ride-on mower.....). Has a goldfish named Kieren and a chair that has a remote controlled mini explosion in the seat to allow Ted to "Blow someone up".
- Jacquie Brennan as Samantha MacDonald – The man-hungry, but perpetually single, highly stressed and neurotic Manager of the retirement village. Has a habit of throwing herself at almost every non-resident eligible bachelor who happens upon the village, even Darcy once, or twice.
- Vanessa Downing as Muriel Johnstone – Johnno's long suffering wife who has a habit of embarrassing her husband by mentioning his explosive or volatile nether functions in front of everyone in the village which usually causes Johnno to stand up and proclaim "For Gods sakes Muriel!!" (she mouths the words "thunder bum"). Claims to have once met the man of her dreams, saying when their eyes met they both just knew. Unfortunately he was also the limo driver taking her and Johnno to their wedding reception and she never saw him again. Usually gives Ted their leftovers for breakfast the next morning such as Sheep's Brains in White Sauce or Tripe or calamari in oyster jelly (all of which Ted smothers with tomato sauce before Darcy usually ends up eating it). Before Joan's book, Muriel claims not to have had relations with Johnno since their Malibu induced "Bicentennial event" while watching the Australia Day festivities on the television in 1988. Muriel has a tendency to get raunchy when under the influence of drugs or alcohol, once flashing the Line Dancing competition judges after accidentally eating Terri's cookies laced with Darcy's pot stash from Ted's garden.
- Kirstie Hutton as Tessa "Terri" Bertolucci – 19-year-old daughter of "The Wog" (Bruno, who had long since moved back to his home town of Wagga Wagga with his wife, Ted's daughter Greta). Terri is Ted's only granddaughter, a university student who moves in with her "Grumblepop" after her previous landlord kicked her out because she failed to pay the rent. Ted keeps telling her to "Get a job", her usual retort is "Get a life". She once streaked at the cricket (though Ted said it didn't count as it was only Women's cricket) and she got arrested for a nude protest with her fellow students at the airport. She hates being called Tessa and strikes up a friendship with the village's exchange doctor from Bangladesh, Dr Khan. Tessa's name pays homage to actress Tessa Mallos who appeared in 6 episodes of Kingswood Country as Sister Maria, a teacher and nun at St Josephs Catholic School.
- Elaine Lee as Joan Collins – A sex obsessed resident of the village and Muriel's best friend. She is a former Logie winning actress (with her Logie award mounted on the bonnet of her car) with many past husbands, including 10 days married to "Bertie", otherwise known as the Archbishop of London. She also has many present lovers and constantly tries to find ways to add Ted to her collection (and does once). Joan writes a sex book for seniors called "You're Never Too Old - Sex in the Golden Years, the Joan Collins Method" which she promotes on television with old friend, John Hinde (Ted remarked that "The nympho's on the telly"). Her book induces the Johnstone's to have many acts inspired by Malibu which leaves them happy, but in matching neck braces.
- Bruce Spence as Darcy Kelso (The Shadow) – Whispering Pines groundskeeper who grows Pot in Ted's garden (Ted thinks they're secret Chinese or Colombian herbs). Darcy is usually spaced out on some sort of drug or magic mushroom and has insinuated that he is on the run from the law. He usually comes up with shady deals to save Ted and Samantha (as the Manager) money, that usually backfire. Has different nicknames for some in the village: Grumble One Kenobi (Ted), Blonde Leader One (Samantha), Mini Mouse or Mighty Midget (Terri) and Sir Johnno the Round (referring to Johnno's pot belly).
- Peter Whitford as John Cazaley "Johnno" Johnstone – Ted's best mate in the village. A proud Rotarian and a Ford Falcon driver who sees himself as the rightful chairman of any committee in the village and is extremely competitive, especially with Ted and those "Wankers at the Royal Oaks Retirement Village" who usually beat Whispering Pines for awards and trophies. Whenever things don't go his way his usual retort is "Oh poop". Gets his mail order porn movies and magazines sent to an oblivious Ted who think's they're gardening videos and welding magazines. Johnno hides his adult material from Muriel under his car, though she usually ends up finding them. Claims he should have married Muriel's sister, and would have had he not gone to get some popcorn, then jumped in the wrong back seat and knocked up Muriel by mistake at the drive-in. He calls Muriels 98-year-old mother "Atilla the Mum", but much to his horror finds out that an online affair under the false names Errol Flynn and Ginger Rogers, was with his mother-in-law. He also claimed to have once played cricket for South Australia (Peter Whitford was born in Adelaide).

=== Guests ===
- Danny Adcock as Terry, a Grade 3 Telstra Supervisor with a corner office who drives a Commodore station wagon that's approved for part-time personal use. He comes to the village to rescue Telstra Installations worker Dave Goddard who was kidnapped by the village until they got their phones fixed (despite Dave telling them that they needed Lines, not Installations). However, Terry is also kidnapped when he says that Telstra does not negotiate with terrorists. Both Terry and Dave were held captive as sex-slaves by Joan, not that either seemed to mind too much.
- Robina Beard as Gwen the Ranger who after giving a wildlife talk to the residents, went after Ted for cruelty to Magpies after he literally tried to blow them up with firecrackers (the "Bullpitt Method" - Put a cracker up its clacker!), and possibly Madge Burrows' cat. She also questioned how Gay Akubra and Repco Lad died.
- Neville Bonner as Self conducting the Australia Day Citizenship ceremony where Dr Khan becomes an Australian citizen. When he asks Ted the name of his concrete Aboriginal (Neville), Ted calls him Arnold.
- John Clayton as a Judge angrily who clears Ted of wilful damage of public property (destroying a speed bump with a front end loader) and the resulting scuffle with police after his "Fat little mate" Johnno had correctly pointed out that speed bumps were technically illegal.
- Barry Crocker as Self who judges the village Home Brew contest. In a bid to beat reigning Retirement Village Association Home Brew champ Johnno, Ted enters his own home brew, but resorts to cheating by substituting VB instead. However, due to a mix-up (Darcy accidentally picked up Ted's beer bucket instead of his pee bucket, needed due to blocked drains in Ted's apartment), Crocker was accidentally served a glass of urine rather than "Bullpitt Bitter" (BB).
- Drew David as Damian, Roxanne's the Weight Loss saleswoman's photographer business partner.
- Ernie Dingo as Self who judges a Garden Gnome contest and awards it to Whispering Pines over Royal Oaks after Ted had pranked the other residents who wanted Neville put inside for the duration of the contest by painting their gnomes black the night before. Following the contest, Ernie gave Ted an Aboriginal flag for Neville to hold.
- Kate Fitzpatrick as Helga Hansen, Johnno's secret online girlfriend from Sweden who announced an unexpected visit to a panicked Johnno. However, he had given his address as Ted's, told her his name was Ted Bullpitt, and had sent a photo of Darcy. Upon her arrival, the mix-up was never cleared as she never knew who she had actually been online with, though Darcy happily accepted playing her Ted.
- Dawn Fraser as Self who almost became a resident of the village by buying Villa No.39. The other residents don't want one of Australia's living treasure's to buy 39 as its the so-called "Villa of Death" but are afraid to tell her the apartments reputation. In the end much to Samantha's dismay, Dawn decided not to buy the apartment.
- Anne Fulwood as Self
- Kevin Golsby as Derek Roving, TV News reporter / Probe host
- Kenneth Goodlet as Cardinal Fitzgerald who re-opened the village's renovated indoor heated pool. However, when he pulled the cord to release the inflatable pool toys, they turned out to be inflatable sex dolls Darcy had bought instead of pool toys.
- Brendan Higgins as Father Paul who performs an Exorcism on Villa No.39.
- John Hinde as Self who helps old friend Joan promote her sex book seniors "You're Never Too Old".
- Shan Jayaweera as Dr Khan, the village's exchange medical practitioner from Bangladesh who loves shocking Ted for a laugh and cooking his national food for the village residents. He later becomes an Australian citizen and has a brother also in Sydney who is a Veterinarian.
- Colin McEwan as Bob Bullpitt, Ted's older brother now single (its not mentioned if he and Merle were divorced or if Bob was a widower) and making a shady living selling time share graves in Surfers Paradise. Twice tries to scheme Ted out of $5,000 and even went as far as stealing Ted's Kingswood to enter it in a contest for $5,000 (which he won), but was thwarted both times by Terri whose dislike for her Great Uncle Bob went as far as knocking him out the first time they met (much to Ted's delight) when he tried to get fresh and grabbed her derrière.
- Ray Meagher as Self/Alf Stewart whose lost Rottweiler "Tiny" took over Ted's chair (and was too big to be blown up) and loved watching Home and Away. When the owner came to collect Tiny he was only identified as "It IS you" and when leaving he said that they had to get back to Summer Bay.
- Genevieve Mooy as Roxanne, a shady Weight Loss product executive. Ted and Johnno (with help from Darcy) try to fool her and her partner Damian into thinking they are both overweight in order to win $1,000 in a weight-loss contest, plus a chance to win a trip to Tahiti. They unwittingly get involved with the NSW Fraud Squad who use Ted's villa (No.35) to stake out the shady deal (there was no prizemoney or trip to Tahiti) and arrest her and her partner.
- Max Phipps as the Archbishop of London. A Nobel Prize winning author and an ex-husband of Joan who unfortunately has to cut short a speech at the village after he eats too many of Ted and Johnno's home made pickled onions with embarrassing results. Afterwards he has one last liaison with Joan before leaving.
- Oscar Redding as Scott, Susan Winchester's photographer
- Elaine Smith as Susan Winchester, a journalist who interviews Joan for Who magazine about her sex book with Ted acting as Joan's husband.
- Theo Stephens as Dave Goddard, a Telstra Installations worker kidnapped by the village in order to get their lines fixed. When his supervisor (Danny Adcock) comes looking for him, they kidnap him too and both are held as "reluctant" sex slaves of Joan's. When finally rescued, Dave quits Telstra and goes to work for Australia Post, saying its a lot less agro and stress while being a Postman is a breeze. That is until kidnapped by Ted in protest to their foul up not delivering his cheque on time that resulted in Ted losing his drivers licence.
- Stuart Wagstaff as Tyrone Wilde, a shady old flame of Joan's who tries to seduce both her and Muriel out of $5,000. However, Muriel steals his passport so he can't flee with the money to New Zealand.
