= Lindsay's Boy =

- Directed by: Frank Arnold
- Written by: Ted Roberts
- Produced by: Frank Arnold
- Starring: Vincent Ball; Joan Bruce; Jenny Lee; Mark Lee
- Production company: ABC
- Distributed by: ABC
- Release date: 1974
- Country: Australia
- Language: English

Lindsay's Boy is a 1974 Australian television film about a soldier who returns from World War Two.

== Cast ==
- Mark Lee as Kevin Lindsay
- Vincent Ball as Jim Lindsay
- Joan Bruce
- Jenny Lee
- Ken Wayne
