= Mr Sheen =

Brand of cleaning products

A British can of Mr Sheen (2005)

Mr Sheen is the brand name of a range of cleaning materials, mainly floor and furniture polish, created in Australia in the 1950s by Samuel Taylor Pty Ltd. An aerosol, the product uses a combination of silicones, waxes and solvents and is currently manufactured by Reckitt. Mr Sheen is also available in Jamaica, Kenya, Ireland and the United Kingdom, as well as in Zimbabwe, Zambia and South Africa where it is called Mr Min and in Argentina where it is known as Mr Frend.

== History ==
In the 1950s, the Australian cleaning product market lacked any aerosol-based products, hence the development of Mr Sheen by Samuel Taylor Pty Ltd, it was the first such product to be offered in the Australian market. The popularity of Mr Sheen received a large boost when the advertising agency Hansen Rubensohn developed both a jingle and a character for the product in the late 1950s. The Australian character (supposedly modeled on one of Samuel Taylor Pty Ltd's employees at the time) was created by Vic Nicholson and Brian Henderson as a smiling, rosy-cheeked, short bald man with spectacles in a black suit (voiced by Ross Higgins); a jingle based on Mister Gallagher and Mister Shean was created at the same time by Bob Gibson and Jimmy White. Both the character and jingle have proved effective branding agents in Australia, where 95% of the populace are capable of recognising the character and jingle as belonging to the Mr Sheen product range. In 1969, British multinational consumer goods company Reckitt Benckiser (then called Reckitt & Colman) acquired Samuel Taylor Pty Ltd; the new owners expanded the range of the product out to the United Kingdom and South Africa. The British version of the character is a cartoon caricature of a First World War biplane pilot (originally voiced by Willie Rushton in the television advertisements) who flies around the house on a dusting cloth cleaning tables, banisters and television sets, using the slogan "Mr Sheen shines umpteen things clean".
