= Kindred Spirits (1984 film) =

- Directed by: Peter Fisk
- Written by: Patricia Johnson
- Produced by: Alan Burke
- Starring: Julieanne Newbould; John Ewart; Patricia Kennedy; Nicholas Eadie
- Production company: ABC
- Distributed by: ABC
- Release date: 12 August 1984
- Country: Australia
- Language: English

Kindred Spirits is a 1984 Australian film about a young girl who has a psychic experience at Bondi Beach. It was the third in a series of Sunday Australian Movies.

Set in contemporary times, Julie witnesses 1938's Black Sunday disaster and is haunted by visions of one of the drowning victims.

Work on Kindred Spirits began in October 1983, was filmed in February to March 1984 with post production finished just before screening in August. It was produced by Alan Burke, directed by Peter Fisk, edited by Bill Russo and features a score composed by Tony Bremmer and performed by the Queensland Symphony Orchestra

The Sydney Morning Herald's Richard Coleman gave it a bad review stating "David Waters, best known for his Norman Ross commercials, squared his shoulders and said confidently: "Damn, bugger, bum, blast!" That was the high point of a remarkably silly script." John O'Hara writes in Cinema Papers "This is a lighter, more delicate film than any of the others, except for its heavy-handed satire of a stand-up comic of the very old school. The film is more romantic and lush than others in the series, but also thin and over-extended."

Kindred Spirit won a Ditmar Award at the 1984 Australian Science Fiction Convention.

== Cast ==
- Julieanne Newbould as Julie
- John Ewart as Tommy
- Patricia Kennedy as Miss Morris
- Nicholas Eadie as Ben
- David Waters as Billy
- Caz Lederman as Amber
- Benita Collings as Tarot reader
- Patrick Ward as Bondi taxi driver
