= Brendan Higgins =

Australian actor

- Occupation: Actor
- Years active: 1983–2006
- Relatives: Ross Higgins (father)

Brendan Higgins is an Australian former actor. For his performance in Hunger was nominated for the 1987 Australian Film Institute Award for Best Performance by an Actor in a Leading Role in a Telefeature (1986–1989). Other screen roles include the film Mary. and a lead role in the ABC TV series Relative Merits.

Higgins, who is the son of Ross Higgins, has appeared onstage in the likes of Hard Times at the Ensemble Theatre, Cafe Fledermaus as part of the Mahler, Vienna and Twentieth Century Festival, Neville's Island at Marian Street Theatre. and Titanic: The Musical at the Theatre Royal.

== Filmography ==
=== Film ===
- Hunger (1986)
- Mary (1994) as Father Julian Woods

=== Television ===
- Murder Call (1998, S2 E13: A Dress to Die For) as Carl Sanderson
- Relative Merits (1987, miniseries) as Paul Urback
