= Late for School =

Australian television comedy series

- Genre: Comedy
- Written by: Bob Menzies, Rob Caldwell
- Directed by: Tina Butler, Riccardo Pellizzeria
- Country of origin: Australia
- No. of seasons: 1
- No. of episodes: 13 episodes

Production
- Producer: John Holmes
- Running time: 30 minutes

Original release
- Network: Network 10
- Release: 1992 – 1992

Late For School is an Australian television comedy series which screened for a single season on Network Ten in 1992.

The series is centred around Kathy Price, who returns to study at the school where she was educated sixteen years previously. This provides much embarrassment to her two teenage children who attend the school. The series is notable for introducing a number of young actors who went on to have success in other Australian television series such as Melissa Thomas, Matthew Newton, Stephen Curry, Anthony Engelman and Scott Major.

The series was produced by John Holmes, directed by Tina Butler and Riccardo Pellizzeri and written by Rob Menzies and Rob Caldwell.

== Cast ==
- Sarah Chadwick as Kathy Price
- Ross Higgins as Stan Price
- Melissa Thomas as Lily Price
- Matthew Newton as Dennis Price
- Frankie J. Holden as Principal S. Lavery
- Harry Cripps as Mr. Dicks
- Anne Phelan as Mrs. Dicks
- Stephen Curry as Tim Hickey
- Anthony Engelman as Sefton
- Scott Major as Oates
