= Gary Reilly =

Australian writer

- Born: 1945 (age 80–81); New Zealand
- Occupations: Television producer; Screenwriter
- Known for: RS Productions; Gary Reilly Productions

Gary Reilly (born New Zealand, 1945) is an Australian radio and television producer and writer. He is known for his work on a variety of comedy series including The Naked Vicar Show, Kingswood Country, Hey Dad..! and Bullpitt!. He won several Australian Writers Guild awards and Logies, as well as being inducted into the Australian Writers' Hall of Fame.

== Career ==
Reilly started work as a trainee with the New Zealand Broadcasting Corporation in 1964, working in various production roles before he moved to advertising; working mostly freelance in most of the industry's creative departments: as writer, art director, production manager, director and MC in New Zealand and Great Britain, then from 1970, in Australia.

Around 1972 he teamed up with Tony Sattler, initially to make television commercials, then with the advent of the ABC's youth radio station 2JJ, to create humorous pieces: "anti-ads" satirizing the advertising industry, mock soap-operas (The Novels of Fiona Wintergreen), space-operas (Chuck Chunder of the Space Patrol) and hospital shows (Doctors and Nurses).

The pivotal radio show for their company RS Productions was The Naked Vicar Show, broadcast nationally from 1976 to 1977. Subsequently, Channel Seven commissioned a television version that was broadcast in 1977 and 1978, which in turn provided the basis for the Logie-winning Kingswood Country. From 1984, Gary worked independently with his own company Gary Reilly Productions.

From 1986 to 1994, Reilly produced a sitcom titled Hey Dad..! for Channel Seven, with writer John Flanagan. In 1997, he partnered with his former writing partner Tony Sattler to write Bullpitt!, which featured the main character ('Ted Bullpitt') from Kingswood Country, now living in a retirement home.

== Awards ==
Reilly and Sattler won two Logie Awards for Best Comedy

- Kingswood Country 1981 and 1982.

Together they won two Australian Writer's Guild AWGIE Awards – Best Comedy (radio)

- 1979 – You only live once
- 1980 – Sunday morning fever

He and Sattler received the 1997 Australian Writer's Guild Freddie Parsons Award for Lifetime Contribution to Comedy.

== Personal life ==
He is married to actress Julie Haseler and they have 3 children.
