= Kevin Golsby =

Australian actor

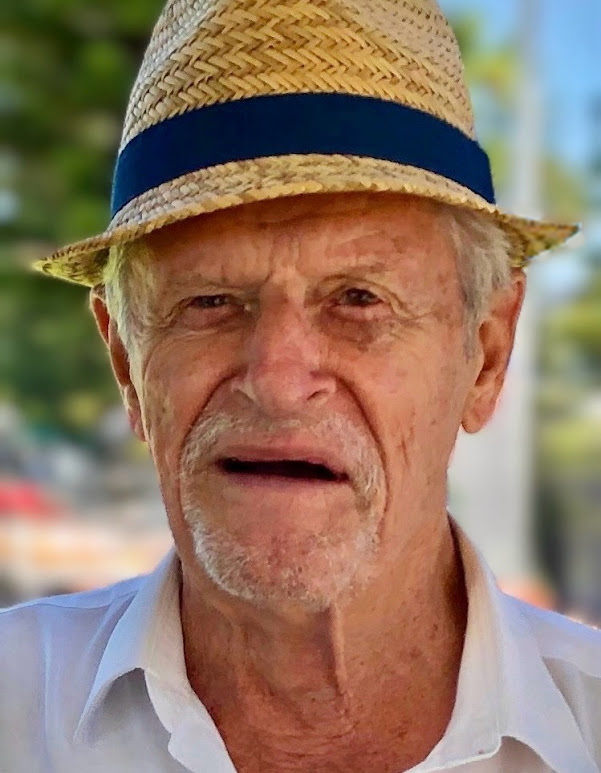
- Golsby in 2018
- Born: 1935 (age 90–91); Mudgee, New South Wales, Australia
- Occupations: Actor; vaudevillian; TV host; comedian; singer; radio announcer; voice artist; author
- Years active: 1951–2017

Kevin Golsby (born 1935) is an Australian actor and voice-over artist, known for his iconic rich voice and seventies moustache. His extensive body of work includes appearances in film, television, theatre and voice-over roles.

Golsby was born in 1935 in Australia. Growing up, he developed a passion for radio and pursued his interest in becoming a presenter and DJ.

== Professional life ==
=== Radio ===
Golsby began his on-air career at 16 as an announcer on station 2MG in Mudgee. Within two years he was the youngest announcer on Sydney radio station 2UE, at 18 years of age. In 1959 Golsby left his regular presenting spot and went on a world tour, travelling to Europe and the US for 2CH and interviewing jazz musicians such as Nina Simone and Count Basie.

In 1976 he was a core cast member, with Noeline Brown and Ross Higgins, of radio 2BL's sketch comedy program The Naked Vicar Show.

=== Voice-over work ===
Golsby was the voice of newsreels for Fox Movietone (Australia) (later Cinesound Movietone Productions) and between 1960 and 1976 narrated over one thousand news stories.

In 1965 he introduced Australians to decimal currency as the voice of "Dollar Bill" in a series of television commercials (with frequent collaborator Ross Higgins as "Mr.Pound").

Most recently, in 2017, he was the voice of a "yes" campaign for the Marriage Equality Plebiscite.

=== Television ===
Throughout the 1970s, Golsby and voice-over colleague Ross Higgins dominated Australian airwaves. While enjoying this success, his break-through role came in 1977 when Noeline Brown, Golsby and Higgins were the hosts and key regular performers in popular sketch comedy series Naked Vicar Show, which spanned radio, television and theatre. He played various characters in the series, which lasted two seasons. Between the sixties and the 2000s Golsby appeared in dozens of Australian television series, in both comedic and dramatic roles. He was often cast as a police officer.

=== Theatre ===
Golsby performed in several stage productions during the seventies and eighties including theatre runs of the Naked Vicar Show in Sydney and Melbourne, Flexitime at the Phillip St Theatre and, in 2011, The Jetty, at Merrigong Theatre Wollongong.

=== Film ===
Golsby appeared in several feature films, including The Cars That Ate Paris, Marco Polo Junior Versus the Red Dragon and The Final Winter.

== Personal life ==
A 1973 Women's Weekly article recounts a story of Golsby and his wife racing to the hospital for the birth of their child and mentions that he lived in a house in Middle Harbour, Sydney.

In 2003 Golsby published a memoir, A Life with Laughs, as part of the Lexington Avenue Press "Fabric of a nation" series.

In 2017 Golsby published his fourth book, a historical novel, The Makepeace chronicle : an account of the remarkable life of John Swiftarrow Makepeace.
