= Ross Higgins =

Australian actor

- Higgins as his most famous character Ted Bullpitt in Kingswood Country
- Born: 14 June 1930; Sydney, New South Wales, Australia
- Died: 7 October 2016 (aged 86); Sydney, New South Wales, Australia
- Occupations: Actor; vaudevillian; TV host; comedian; singer; radio announcer; voice artist
- Years active: 1945–2016
- Spouse: Nadine
- Children: 4, including actor Brendan Higgins

Ross Higgins (14 June 1930 – 7 October 2016) was an Australian vaudevillian, character actor, television host, comedian, singer and voice actor. He was best known for his role as Ted Bullpitt in the 1980s television situation comedy series Kingswood Country and brief revival Bullpitt!. He was also a commercial advertiser who provided the voice of animated character "Louie the Fly" in the television ad campaign for Mortein, over a 50-year period (the longest running such ad in Australia) as well as Mr. Pound, when decimal currency was first introduced in Australia.

== Career ==
=== Radio ===
Higgins' entertainment industry career began in 1946, when he took a cadetship at Sydney's 2GB commercial radio station at the age of 16. This led to an on-air announcing position and hosting of breakfast and, later, evening variety shows.

He subsequently joined the ABC working in the Light Entertainment Department. A trained singer, he soon began recording singles which lifted his profile around Australia. His flair for comedy came to the fore in the 1950s when he became a cast member of the very popular The Jack Davey Show. He moved between commercial radio and the ABC, touring the country, hosting and singing with the ABC show band. It was during this period he performed with Peter Dawson, Slim Dusty and Mel Tormé. His radio career reached a peak in the mid-1950s and, when television arrived in 1956, he successfully made the transition, appearing on variety shows, hosting game shows on the 7 Network and in the early 1960s on Singalong and Bobby Limb's Sound of Music on the 9 Network.

=== Recording ===
Higgins used his vocal talents on thousands of projects during his 60 years in radio and television, including recording the song "Monster Mash" for ABC For Kids Video Hits, and two albums of the classic Australian children's story "Blinky Bill".

=== Voice over ===
During the 1960s, Higgins consolidated his position as a leading voiceover artist, creating character voices for TV and radio ads and cartoons. His earliest character voice—"Louie the Fly" (an animated fly for the Mortein fly-spray commercials), was recorded by him as late as 2011. It is now the longest continuously running campaign in television history, having run for over 50 years (1957–2011). Other characters that Higgins voiced included Mr. Sheen, Mr. Pound and the Paddle Pop Lion.

=== Theatre ===
During the mid-1960s, Higgins worked in theatre, doing several back-to-back seasons at Sydney's Menzies Theatre Restaurant—a popular nightspot where musicals were staged under the direction of Hayes Gordon.

=== Television ===
Higgins played Rev. Larcombe in two episodes of the soap opera Motel in 1968. He also had guest roles in various series, including Division 4 and Skippy. Throughout the 1970s, he and voiceover colleague Kevin Golsby dominated Australian airwaves. While enjoying this success, another break-through role came in 1977 when he and Golsby were key regular performers in sketch comedy series The Naked Vicar Show. He played various characters in the series, which lasted two seasons. In 1980, a spin-off series based on a bombastic Holden Kingswood driving character he had portrayed in one sketch of The Naked Vicar Show was created. Titled Kingswood Country, the series had a successful five-year run, completing five-and-a-half seasons.

As well as being known as the voice of Mortein's "Louie the Fly", during the 1980s Higgins did TV commercials for one of their main competitors in the Australian market, Pea Beu.

Higgins played a straight dramatic role in the soap opera Richmond Hill (1988). His character, a dour policeman, was the show's main authority figure. The series was cancelled at the end of 1988. In 1992, he starred in the Ten Network's sitcom Late for School (which launched the TV careers of Matthew Newton and Stephen Curry). Higgins' final series saw him reprise the Ted Bullpitt character in the situation comedy Bullpitt! in 1997, which had two seasons on the 7 Network. Kingswood Country has since found new audiences via cable TV, DVD and YouTube.

== Filmography ==
=== Film ===
Year	Title	Role	Notes
1977	Dot and the Kangaroo	Willie Wagtail (voice)	Animated feature film
1984	Epic	Voice	Animated feature film
1991	The Magic Riddle	Philippe's singing voice	Animated feature film
1992	Blinky Bill: The Mischievous Koala	The Frogs (voices)	Animated feature film

=== Television ===
Year	Title	Role	Notes
1968	Motel	Reverend Larcombe	TV series
1969	Division 4	Guest role	TV series
1968-1969	Skippy	Guest role	TV series
1977	The Naked Vicar Show	Various characters	TV series, 2 seasons
1980	Kingswood Country	Ted Bullpitt	TV series
1988	Richmond Hill	Dan Costello	TV series
1992	Late for School	Stan Price	TV series
1997	Bullpitt!	Ted Bullpitt	TV series, 2 seasons
2001	Pizza	Vietnam Vet	TV series, Cameo

== Discography ==
=== Albums ===
List of albums, with selected chart positions
Title	Album details	Peak chart positions
Title	Album details	AUS
The Highwayman. Highlights from the Australian Musical Comedy by Eddie Samuels (with Jan Mazurus, Valda Bagnall, Babs McKinnon, Bob Gibson and His Orchestra)	Released: 1964; Format: LP; Label: World Record Club (7082)	-
Eddie's Alphabet	Released: 1968; Format: LP; Label: Parlophone (PMEO 9441)	-
The Naked Vicar Show (with Noeline Brown and Kev Golsby )	Released: 1975; Format: LP; Label: EMI (EMC-2545)	-
Son Of Naked Vicar (with Noeline Brown and Kev Golsby )	Released: 1976; Format: LP; Label: EMI (EMC-2572)	55
The Adventures of Blinky Bill (with Dorothy Wall)	Released: 1976; Format: LP; Label: M7 (MLX-117)	-
The Further Adventures of Blinky Bill (with Dorothy Wall)	Released: 1977; Format: LP; Label: M7 (MLX-167)	-
Live from The Madge Burrows Room! / The Naked Vicar Show (with Noeline Brown, Kev Golsby, Colin McEwan and Julie McGregor)	Released: 1978; Format: LP; Label: EMI (EMC-2671)	84

=== Singles ===
Higgins recorded a 7" single version of "Monster Mash" for ABC Kids (Australia) in 1989.

== Personal life and death ==
Higgins and his wife Nadine had four children, including actor Brendan Higgins.

He died of unspecified causes on 7 October 2016, aged 86. He had been ill for some time and had been hospitalized for several weeks.
