= The Naked Vicar Show =

Australian radio and television series

- Title card
- Genre: Satirical comedy
- Written by: Gary Reilly; Tony Sattler
- Starring: Ross Higgins; Noeline Brown; Kevin Golsby; Colin McEwan; Julie McGregor; Laurel McGowan
- Country of origin: Australia
- Original language: English

Production
- Producers: Gary Reilly; Tony Sattler
- Running time: 50 minutes
- Production company: RS Productions

Original release
- Network: Seven Network
- Release: 26 March – 25 October 1978

The Naked Vicar Show is an Australian satirical comedy radio and television show. The series was created, written and produced by Gary Reilly and Tony Sattler of RS Productions, it premiered on radio in 1976 on ABC Radio Double J (later Triple J), and there was a record made featuring highlights from the first series, before making the transition to television broadcast on the Seven Network in 1977 and ended in 1978. The stars also performed a live cabaret season of the show during 1976. The program was the forerunner to the comedy series Kingswood Country.

== Broadcast sheet ==
=== Radio ===
- Season 1 March 21–13 June 1976 (13 × 30 mins)
- Season 2 7 November 1976 – 20 March 1977 (13 × 30 mins)
- Special – "The Vicar's Birthday Party" 11 July 1982 (60 mins) Broadcast live from the Sydney Opera House

=== Television ===
- Season 1 26 May 1977 – 1 November 1977 (13 × 50 mins)
- Season 2 14 February 1978 – 25 October 1978 (8 × 50 mins)

== Cast ==
The series starred actor comedian Ross Higgins, comedy actress Noeline Brown and veteran announcer Kevin Golsby, with a supporting cast including Colin McEwan, Julie McGregor and Laurel McGowan.

== Discography ==
=== Studio albums ===
List of albums, with Australian chart positions
Title	Album details	Peak chart positions
Title	Album details	AUS
The Naked Vicar Show (by Ross Higgins, Noeline Brown and Kevin Golsby (as Kev Golsby))	Released: 1975; Format: LP; Label: EMI (EMC-2545)	–
Son of Naked Vicar (by Ross Higgins, Noeline Brown and Kevin Golsby (as Kev Golsby))	Released: 1976; Format: LP; Label: EMI (EMC-2572)	55
Live from the Madge Burrows Room! / The Naked Vicar Show (by Noeline Brown, Kevin Golsby (as Kev Golsby), Colin McEwan and Julie McGregor)	Released: 1978; Format: LP; Label: EMI (2671)	84
