= Kingswood Country =

Australian television sitcom (1980–1984)

- Series title card
- Genre: Sitcom
- Created by: Gary Reilly; Tony Sattler
- Written by: Gary Reilly; Tony Sattler; Doug Edwards; Ian Heydon
- Directed by: Kevin Burston
- Starring: Ross Higgins; Judi Farr; Peter Fisher; Laurel McGowan; Lex Marinos; Colin McEwan; Maggie Dence; Sheila Kennelly
- Composer: Mike Perjanik
- Country of origin: Australia
- No. of series: 6
- No. of episodes: 89

Production
- Producers: Gary Reilly; Tony Sattler
- Camera setup: Multi-camera
- Running time: 30 minutes
- Production company: RS Productions

Original release
- Network: Seven Network
- Release: 30 January 1980 – 1 September 1984

Related
- Bullpitt!

Kingswood Country is an Australian sitcom that was broadcast on the Seven Network from 1980 to 1984. It was created by Gary Reilly and Tony Sattler and produced by their production company, RS Productions. The series starred Ross Higgins, Judi Farr, Peter Fisher, Laurel McGowan and Lex Marinos, and was a spin-off from a series of sketches on the comedy sketch series The Naked Vicar Show.

The show premiered on Channel 7 in a 7:30 pm timeslot on 30 January 1980. It ran for six seasons and 89 episodes from 1980 to 1984. The series won Logie Awards for Best Comedy in 1982 and 1983. A sequel series, titled Bullpitt!, was broadcast from 1997 to 1998.

== Premise ==
The series is a family sitcom which follows the life of Ted Bullpitt and his interactions with his vague wife, Thelma, his progressive adult children, Craig and Greta, and his Italian son-in-law Bruno, to whom Ted objects. Ted, a conservative, immature and petty individual, lives for three things in life: his beloved chair in front of the television, his unsuccessful racing greyhounds Repco Lad and Gay Akubra, and his beloved Holden Kingswood (which, later in the series, was replaced for Holden's replacement mid-range family car, the Commodore). His long-suffering wife, the vague and dithering Thelma, is a housewife trapped by Ted's conservative family views, although she often gets her own back on her husband.

Ted's son, Craig, is a sexually rampant medical student who often clashes with his father over their differing views on life, sex and politics. Ted's daughter, Greta, is a feminist, and is married to Bruno Bertolucci, the son of Italian immigrants, to whom Ted objects, often referring to him as a "bloody wog" and an "Al Grassby Groupie".

Humour was generated by the conflict of Ted's traditional views and his children's progressive nature. A recurring gag was Ted's references to Neville, his concrete Aboriginal garden statue, which was named after Australia's first Aboriginal Senator, Neville Bonner, who enjoyed the series so much he visited the show's recording. At other times, humour was based on the more traditional comedic methods Ted's poorly thought-out get-rich-quick schemes; class differences between the suburban Bullpitts and Ted's Datsun-dealer brother Bob and his upwardly-mobile wife Merle); and simple misunderstandings.

== Cast and characters ==
=== Main characters ===
- Ross Higgins as Edward "Ted" Melba Bullpitt, a white Australian, conservative, Holden Kingswood-loving putty factory worker and WWII veteran. Immature and petty, Ted is also intolerant of Catholics. During the war, he was part of a kitchen unit captured by the Italians, which explains his dislike for Bruno Bertolucci. He enjoys reading the comic Mandrake, sitting in front of the television with his paper or a beer, and tending to his greyhounds, Gay Akubra and Repco Lad. Ted is known as "Big Bum Bullpitt" to the students and nuns at the local Catholic school St Joseph's. He is afraid of the nuns, although he likes Sister Maria, because she also likes beer. According to Ted, he is a descendant of Lord Stokely Bullpitt of Kingswood who died in 1786 as he fell from his horse during a nun hunt. His only son was illegitimate so therefore could not claim his father's title. That son married an Italian kitchen maid named Maria Bertalucci – an ancestor of Bruno. The title was first bestowed by Henry VIII to a man whom he gave a large section of his forest or the King's Wood, hence the title.
- Judi Farr as Thelma "Thel" Bullpitt, Ted's wife and the mother of Craig and Greta, who often answers the telephone with catchphrases in the hope of winning prizes from TV Week or competition running on the radio. Thelma keeps a drawer full of old receipts to show Ted after buying expensive items from Myer (she holds her fingers over the date and waves the receipt at him, showing a small purchase). Thelma gives very specific advice on how to perform everyday chores – for example, making coffee or tea, "You'll have to add hot water dear, otherwise it'll be a bit dry". At the end of the fourth series, Thelma leaves on an extended holiday which lasted until the end of the series.
- Peter Fisher as Craig Bullpitt, Ted's only son. He is a medical student who, later in the series, marries his girlfriend Wendy.
- Laurel McGowan as Greta Bertolucci, née Bullpitt, Ted's only daughter who is married to Bruno Bertolucci.
- Lex Marinos as Bruno Bertolucci, Ted's son-in-law, who he refers to as "the wog", and is married to Greta and was born (as was Marinos) in "Wagga". He drives a purple Chrysler Valiant, which is often a sore point with the Holden-loving Ted. Bruno takes great delight in poking fun at Ted and calling him "Grumblebum" or "Teddles", but affectionately calls Thelma "Mrs B" and sympathises with her for having to put up with Ted. Towards the end of the series, Bruno becomes a recurring character.
- Shelia Kennelly as Rosa Bertolucci, a relative of Bruno's who looks after Ted when Thelma leaves on holiday. Appearing from the fifth series onwards, Rosa is fond of cooking, and describes herself as a "happy-go-lucky wog".

=== Recurring cast and characters ===
- Colin McEwan as Bob Bullpitt, Ted's younger brother, who is a used car salesman. Often referred to as a "bloody Datsun dealer" by Ted. He has a love-hate relationship with both Ted and his own wife Merle and insults are often traded, though he does have a soft spot for Thelma. His trademark greeting is, "Hey-dee ho everybody, here comes the party!" which was usually followed by Merle saying "Shut up Bob!". Its insinuated that Bob is always having affairs with his latest secretary, including one who "suddenly had to move to Melbourne".
- Maggie Dence as Merle Bullpitt, Ted's upwardly mobile sister-in-law, who is married to Ted's younger brother Bob. Merle dislikes her husband Bob (a feeling that is mutual), and dislikes Ted, often referring to him as a "cretin". She often insults them both, although she gets on well with her sister-in-law, Thelma, despite Thelma's vague nature. Bob and Merle do actually love each other despite their general dislike for each other. One of the reasons they stay together and even get re-married after accidentally getting divorced, is because everything that they own including the big items such as the house, the business, their money and the purple speedboat, is all in her name, a point Merle never lets Bob forget.

== Guest ==
A notable guest star was Graham Kennedy, a friend of series creators Reilly and Sattler. Kennedy appeared as himself in the 1980 episode "The Royal Visit" (Series 2, Episode 3).

== Catchphrases ==
In 2009, TV Tonight conducted a survey to gain feedback for the greatest catchphrases in Australian television history. Ted Bullpitt's "Pickle me grandmother!" was listed as one of the most popular catchphrases for a comedy series, in addition to being listed as one of the best catchphrases across all genres of Australian television.

Other notable catchphrases that were used in the series included:

- "Don't 'Dad' me boy/girl, I'm your father!" ("Don't 'Mum and Dad' us boy/girl, we're your parents" was also used.)
- [when surprised from behind] "Strewth! Give a man a heart attack!"
- "Strike me Catholic!"
- [when someone asks to drink his beer] "Put the money on the fridge!". Sometimes changed to "Put the money on the fridge, wog!" when Bruno asked Ted for a beer.
- "Somebody/someone should blow [current object of annoyance] up!" For example, "Someone should blow those nuns up!"
- "The Kingswood! You're not taking the Kingswood!..." [insert far-fetched excuse]. For example, "I've just ducoed the tyres" or "I've just glad-wrapped the aerial!" or "I've just Mr Sheened the number-plate!"
- "When I was a boy... " [insert long-winded, far-fetched story]. Always responded to with "Yeah yeah, sure Ted/Dad."
- "Hate, hate, vomit!"
- [when asked how his day went] "Bloody shambles, of course!"
- [Bruno's universal insult for a miserable, miserly old man] "Grumblebum!"
- [in response to someone mishearing his surname] "No, it's Bullpitt. Yes, everyone says that." Also said often by Thelma when talking on the phone.
- "Where's the bloody Kingswood?"
- [describing Sister Maria] "Attila the Nun"
- "Bloody wogs!"
- "Bloody woman!"
- "Bloody nuns!"
- "Blow 'em all up!"
- "Watch it, mate!"
- "No wonder the country's in a mess"
- "I win, you lose, and I'm the king of the castle!"
- "Never marry a woman, mate"
- "Where's my paper?"

== Episodes ==
Series	Episodes	Originally aired	
Series	Episodes	Series premiere	Series finale
1	13	30 January 1980	11 June 1980
2	13	18 June 1980	24 September 1980
3	20	18 June 1981	15 October 1981
4	23	27 May 1982	26 April 1984
5	10	1984	1984
6	10	7 July 1984	13 September 1984

== Home media releases ==
The Best of Kingswood Country DVD cover (Volume 1).

Until 2019, only 52 of the 89 episodes of Kingswood Country had been released on DVD. The first home media release was a "best of" collection of thirteen episodes in 2003. It included the original sketch from The Naked Vicar Show which spawned the series and a blooper reel, in addition to a photo gallery, which only appears on this original release. A second "best of", featuring an additional thirteen episodes, was released in 2006. In September 2008, a third "best of" set was released, and on 12 May 2010, a fourth "best of" set was released, featuring another thirteen episodes.

On 4 December 2019, The Complete Series collection was released as an 11-disc DVD boxset, distributed by Via Vision Entertainment. In November 2023, The Ted Bullpitt Collection, featuring every episode from both Kingswood Country and its sequel Bullpitt!, was released in a 15-disc DVD boxset.

Title	Discs	Episodes	Special features	Release date (Region 4)	Distributor
The Best of Kingswood Country	3	Series 1: Episodes 1, 8, 10, 11 Series 2: Episodes 14, 16, 19 Series 3: Episodes 16, 31 Series 4: Episodes 7, 8, 15, 16	The original sketch from The Naked Vicar Show; Goof reel; Fantastic Photo Gallery	1 December 2003	Shock Entertainment
The Best of Kingswood Country: Volume Two	3	Series 1: Episodes 12, 13 Series 2: Episode 2 Series 3: Episodes 4, 10, 14, 19 Series 4: Episodes 2, 14 Series 5: Episodes 2, 8 Series 6: Episodes 1, 10		4 September 2006	Shock Entertainment
The Best of Kingswood Country: Volume Three	3	13		30 August 2008	Shock Entertainment
Best of Kingswood Country: Volume 4	3	13		12 May 2010	Shock Entertainment
Best of Kingswood Country: Collection	12	52 (contains Volumes 1-4)		13 October 2010	Shock Entertainment
Kingswood Country: The Complete Series	11	All	The original sketch from The Naked Vicar Show; Goof reel	4 December 2019	Via Vision Entertainment
The Ted Bullpitt Collection	15	All (also includes all episodes of Bullpitt!)	The original sketch from The Naked Vicar Show; Goof reel	8 November 2023	Via Vision Entertainment

== Sequel ==
A sequel series, Bullpitt!, was broadcast from 1997 to 1998. Of the original cast, only Ross Higgins had a regular role. Elaine Lee co-starred.

== See also ==
- The Last of the Australians, an earlier Australian sitcom which was similar to Kingswood Country.
- Alf Garnett from Till Death Us Do Part, a similar British comedy.
- Archie Bunker from All in the Family, a similar American comedy (adapted from Till Death Us Do Part).
