= Bex (compound analgesic) =

Brand name pharmaceutical

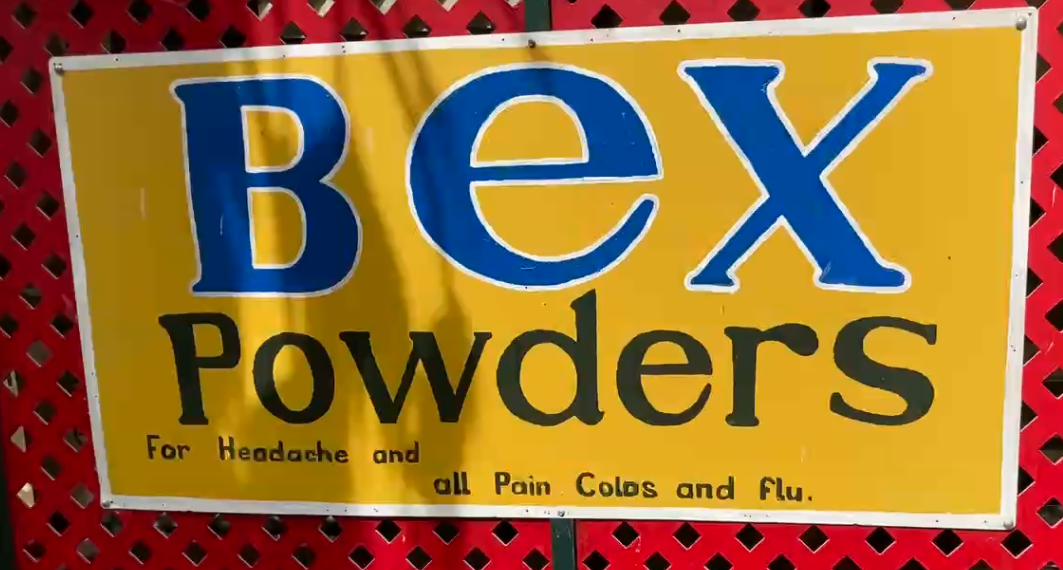
Old sign, once located prominently throughout Australia. This sign is located at the entrance to the Pioneer Museum, Tailem Bend, South Australia.

Bex was a strong compound analgesic which was popular in Australia for much of the 20th century. It came in the form of APC (aspirin–phenacetin–caffeine) tablets or powder, containing 42% aspirin and 42% phenacetin plus caffeine.

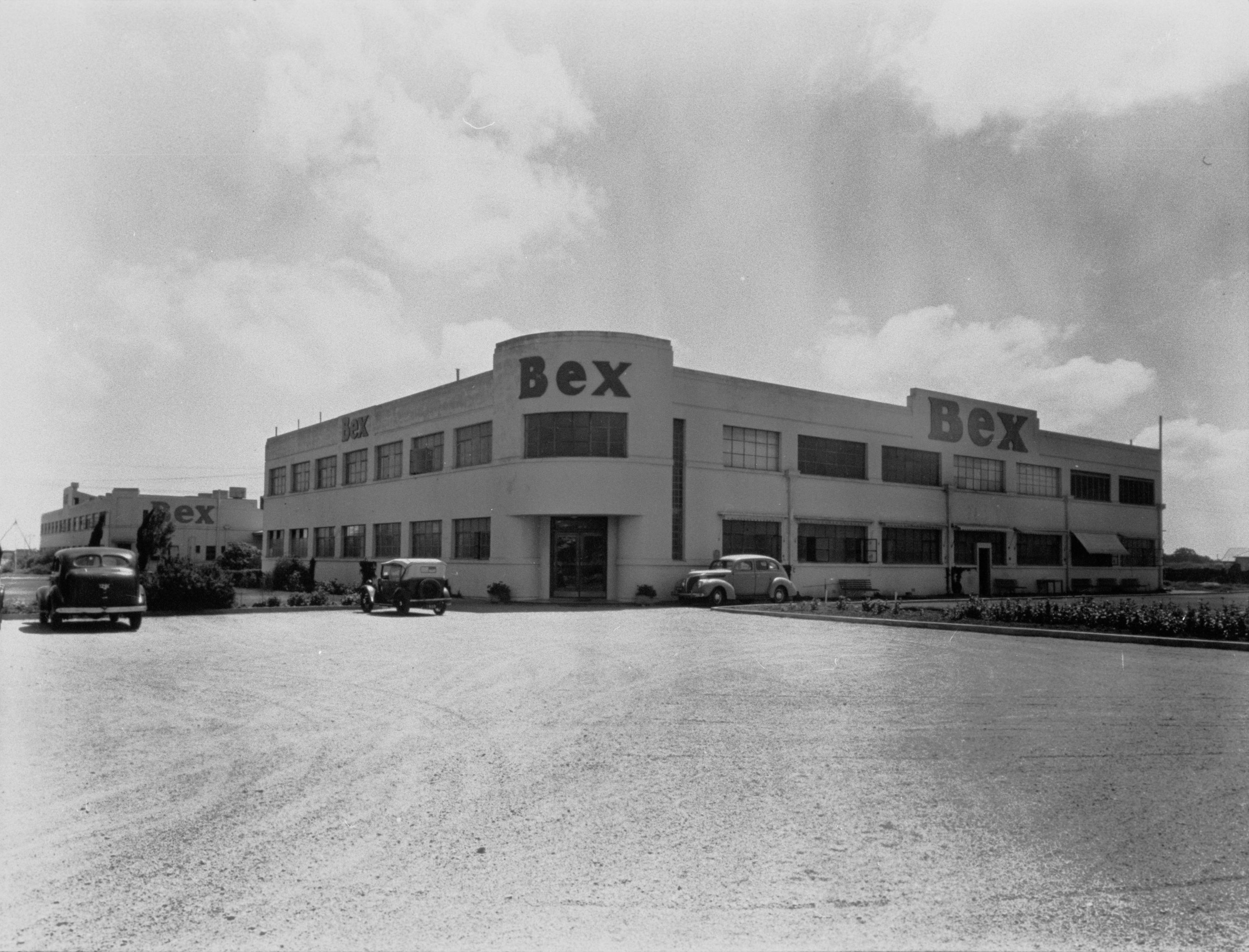
Beckers Ltd - outside view of Bex building

Bex was a product of Beckers Pty Ltd, originally based at Pym Street, Dudley Park, South Australia, but which relocated to Sydney in the 1960s. It was advertised with the phrase, "Stressful Day? What you need is a cup of tea, a Bex and a good lie down". Bex powders, as well as other APC products such as Vincent's, were particularly seen as the housewife's drug of choice in the 1950s and 1960s. However, it became recognised that these medications were addictive, and Priscilla Kincaid-Smith found that the large doses of phenacetin ingested by habitual users were responsible for widespread kidney disease. The phenacetin was removed from Bex in 1975. Bex has also been linked to kidney cancer.

== In popular culture ==
The expression "A cup of tea, a Bex, and a good lie down" gained currency through much of Australia in the post-World War II period when aspirin became readily available. McKellar's play reinforced the phrase "and the title quickly became a common Australian saying". It was often abbreviated to "go and take a Bex" and used in a pejorative sense to indicate to an over-eager person that they should take a more relaxed attitude to a situation. As such, it has had currency in bar room discussions, particularly where someone has become animated in expressing a point of view that is contrary to the general view of the group. In September 2011 former Prime Minister of Australia, Kevin Rudd, told the media, "I just think it would be a good thing if everyone seriously had a cup of tea and a Bex and a long lie down, OK?" over reports of his possible challenge to his leader, the incumbent prime minister, Julia Gillard.

So ubiquitous was the expression that A Cup of Tea, a Bex and a Good Lie Down, a comedy revue, opened at Sydney's Phillip Street Theatre on 18 September 1965. It was the longest running show at the theatre in 1966 and was performed over 250 times during its extended run. The cast included John Ewart, Gloria Dawn, Ruth Cracknell and Reg Livermore. The play was written by John McKellar.

== See also ==
- Vincent Chemical Co., manufacturers of Vincent's APC powders and tablets, a similar formulation
