= A Cup of Tea, a Bex and a Good Lie Down =

1965 stage review by John McKellar

- Original language: English
- Written by: John McKellar
- Genre: musical revue

Premiere
- Date: November 9, 1965
- Place: Phillip St Theatre, Sydney
- Directed by: William Orr

A Cup of Tea, a Bex and a Good Lie Down is a 1965 Australian stage revue by John McKellar. The title references Bex, which was a popular compound analgesic in Australia at the time. The play popularised the phrase, "A Cup of Tea, a Bex and a Good Lie Down", which "quickly became a common Australian saying".

The play premiered at Phillip Street Theatre and ran for more than 250 performances. The cast included John Ewart, Gloria Dawn, Ruth Cracknell and Reg Livermore. The play is McKellar's most critically acclaimed and popularly attended work. The Bulletin called it "good, clean fun" with "some brilliant spots and an enlivening finale."
