= Tommy Tycho =

Tommy Tycho AM, MBE
- Born: 11 April 1928; Budapest, Hungary
- Died: 4 April 2013 (aged 84) Randwick, New South Wales, Australia
- Genres: Classical music, jazz, popular music
- Occupations: Conductor, composer, arranger, musical director
- Instrument: Piano

Thomas Tycho AM MBE DMus (11 April 1928 – 4 April 2013) was a Hungarian-born Australian pianist, conductor, composer and arranger. He was active in both classical music and pop.

He was associated with musical productions on Australian television for many years from its inception in 1956, including such programs as The Mavis Bramston Show. The recorded version of the Australian national anthem "Advance Australia Fair" that is now usually used to accompany singers at major sporting and community events is Tommy Tycho's arrangement. He wrote a number of film scores, and his activities bridged both popular and classical styles.

== Biography ==
Tycho was born in Budapest in April 1928. His father was a senior government official and his mother was an opera singer who had retired to raise a family. His musical life started as a child prodigy pianist. He played George Gershwin's Rhapsody in Blue with the Budapest Philharmonic Orchestra at age 10. He had been introduced to the work by his teacher, Egon Petri. He commenced studying at the Franz Liszt Academy of Music in Budapest, where his teachers included Leo Weiner and Zoltán Kodály. He and his parents had adopted Lutheranism in an attempt to disguise their Jewishness, but to no avail – he was interned in a German forced labour camp in 1943 at age 15, and was lucky to survive. He resumed his musical studies after the war, but left Hungary after the Communist takeover while still only in his third year of study. From 1948 to 1951 he lived in Iran, where he was the personal pianist for the Shah of Iran. There he met a Hungarian soprano named Eva Komor, who became his wife. They emigrated to Australia in 1951.

He commenced his musical career at ABC Radio in the 1950s, performing a weekly recital titled Handful of Keys, which led to a regular popular radio program with his own chamber group The Thomas Tycho Players. Tycho joined ATN7 in 1956 and was musical director at the Seven Network for 15 years, 1956 to 1971. He composed music for shows such as Revue '61 & '62, Startime, The Mavis Bramston Show, Anzacs, Penthouse, Riptide, and You Can't See 'Round Corners, until he left in 1971. He also composed the theme for the television program and movie, Number 96. Tycho was involved in nine Royal Command Performances, and conducted all the ABC symphony orchestras. His work was an important element of many official openings (Sydney Opera House, Sydney Entertainment Centre, Sydney Football Stadium, Queensland Performing Arts Centre, Brisbane 1982 Commonwealth Games, World Expo 88, Darling Harbour, major sporting grand finals, etc.). In 2008 he performed for Crown Princess Mary of Denmark at the opening of the Victor Chang Cardiac Research Institute. (In 1980, after a heart attack, he had been treated by Dr Victor Chang.)

The Australian artists with whom he worked included Peter Allen, Ricky May, Olivia Newton-John, Julie Anthony, John Farnham, Anthony Warlow, Jill Perryman, Barry Crocker, Kamahl, James Morrison, Frank Bennett (Singer, saxophonist), David Campbell, Judi Connelli, violinist Ian Cooper, Suzanne Johnstone, Jackie Love, James Blundell, Don Burrows, Andy Firth, Marina Prior, Rob Guest, Jimmy Little, Tommy Emmanuel, Normie Rowe, Rhonda Burchmore, Ingrid James, Donald Cant and many others. He also worked with overseas performers such as Sammy Davis Jr., Nat King Cole, Shirley Bassey, Louis Armstrong, Jerry Lewis, Frank Sinatra and many others.

Tommy Tycho suffered a serious stroke in 2008. He then lived in a nursing home where he received regular therapy; though his left side was paralysed, he still composed and played with his right hand.

Tycho died on 4 April 2013, aged 84, as a result of complications associated with pneumonia.

== Compositions ==
His compositions and arrangements include:

- 3 overtures
- 3 concertos (for trumpet, violin, piano)
  - The Violin Concerto was written around 2000, but did not have its premiere until 10 April 2010; Maria Lindsay, soloist, played with the Lurline Chamber Orchestra at the Randwick Town Hall.
- television music (documentary series ANZAC, drama series Riptide, and others)
- film scores (Young Einstein, Reckless Kelly, many others)
- arranged over 1,500 pieces for film and television, including:
  - "Cole Porter Concerto", based on three Cole Porter tunes
  - "Fantasia" (based on three Irving Berlin tunes)
  - "No Other Love" (symphonic arrangement of the song by Richard Rodgers
  - Symphonic arrangement of "Macarthur Park" by Jimmy Webb
  - Symphonic arrangement of Cole Porter's "Begin the Beguine"
  - "Tiger Rag" (in the style of Art Tatum)
- the medal ceremony music for the Sydney 2000 Olympic Games and the Melbourne 2006 Commonwealth Games
- songs for stage revues including Lie Back and Enjoy It and There Will Be an Interval of 15 Minutes and a musical When We Are Married for the Phillip Theatre, and arrangements for a musical Get Happy (2003)

In 2003 Tommy Tycho was commissioned by Symphony Australia to compose an overture for the 75th birthday celebrations of the West Australian Symphony Orchestra. That same year he conducted the Queensland Orchestra for concerts with Anthony Warlow, and many others. He was the arranger and conductor for Warlow's album, Let's Face the Music; and he conducted the Adelaide Symphony Orchestra in a Lounge concert.

Tycho wrote a series of special feature arrangements for Australian clarinetist Andy Firth, when Firth was featured as guest artist with the Atlanta Symphony Orchestra in 2006.

== Discography ==
=== Charting albums ===
Title	Album details	Peak chart positions
Title	Album details	AUS
Duelling Pianos (with Vicki Tycho)	Released: 1984; Format: Label: K-Tel International (NA649)	43

== Honours and awards ==
Among his many accolades can be counted:

- In 1977, Tycho was made a Member of the Order of the British Empire (MBE)
- In 1987 he was appointed a Member of the Order of Australia (AM)
- In 1992 he won the Rotary International Paul Harris Fellowship Award, in appreciation of tangible and significant assistance given for furtherance of better understanding and friendly relations among peoples of the world
- In 2007 he was conferred the degree of honorary Doctor of Music from the University of Sydney.

=== Mo Awards ===
The Australian Entertainment Mo Awards (commonly known informally as the Mo Awards), were annual Australian entertainment industry awards. They recognised achievements in live entertainment in Australia from 1975 to 2016. Tommy Tycho was Patron of the Mo Awards for many years and won one award during this time.

Year	Nominee / work	Award	Result (wins only)
1984	Tommy Tycho	John Campbell Fellowship Award	Won

== Bibliography ==
- The Tommy Tycho Story : Music, Maestro Please. Ringwood, Victoria, Australia: Brolga Pub. 1995. ISBN 0-909608-31-8. OCLC 34960665.
