= Vincent Chemical Co. =

Vincent Chemical Company was an Australian business noted for manufacture of a popular compound analgesic "Vincent's APC"

== History ==
Dr. Harry John Clayton (ca.1887 – 31 October 1928) of Macquarie Street and medical superintendent of the Royal Prince Alfred Hospital, Sydney, took the headache remedy then in general use, composed of phenacetin and caffeine, and by experimenting with the addition of aspirin, arrived at what became the standard formulation known as A.P.C. powder, or in the Royal Prince Alfred Hospital Pharmacopæia for 1918 as Pulvis Analgesicus.

In 1919, at the insistence of his wife, Clayton founded a partnership consisting of Mrs Clayton, E. W. Wills, C. K. Probert (dispenser at the Royal Prince Alfred Hospital), and J. A. Vincent (1890 – 12 June 1933), who had been assistant dispenser at the hospital, and was at that time a pharmacist with a business at Five Dock. Clayton chose the names "Vincent Chemical Company" and "Vincent's APC" to distance himself, as a practicing physician, from any commercial product. During the pneumonic influenza epidemic April to July 1919, he offered many of his customers packages of the compound as A.P.C. powder, which may have been labeled "Vincent's A.P.C." The partnership was incorporated on 11 September 1919 with paid-up capital of £200; £50 from each of the partners; later doubled to total £400. Vincent made up the compound, coloured pink, in premises adjacent to his chemist's shop, as 12 envelopes of powder in a box, or as 24 tablets in a small bottle, and labeled as "pain remedy". Printed instructions for use, supplied gratis by Clayton, were included with each package, bearing the company's trademark "Vincent's APC". The business did not thrive initially, at least in part due to insufficient advertising, and in May 1921 Vincent sold his share of the business (as did Wills) to Probert and Mrs. Clayton, and left for America to train as a dentist, selling his chemist's shop and passing the fledgling manufacturing business to wholesale druggist William Delany. After several months of supplying Clayton and Probert with the product, he was brought into the partnership. In July 1923 the business was re-formed with three owners, Dora Lauraine Clayton, Minnie Probert and Harriett Delany, with joint managers Mr. Probert and Mr. Delany, and in that year the company first showed a profit. They registered their trademark "Vincent's APC" on 21 July 1930, and invested heavily in advertising: £2575 in 1931, £3367 in 1932 and £4703 in 1933, in which year they made a profit of £18,400. The trademark design changed little from this time: "VINCENT'S" in white lettering on a blue rectangle, with "A•P•C" in white on a blue semicircle attached directly below, and "GENUINE (PINK)" in blue on a yellow semicircle attached above.

== Return of Dr. Vincent ==
In 1924, Vincent returned to Sydney, having qualified as Doctor of Dental Surgery, and opened a practice in Haberfield. He was still on friendly terms with Probert, and intimated to him that he would like to rejoin the partnership, and on 8 March 1926 wrote to them with an offer, intimating that he had other products with which they could diversify, to which Delany replied on 10 March, stating that none of the shareholders was interested in his proposal, concluding ominously: "As you mention that you are desirous of putting certain new lines of chemical preparations on the Australian market, I have to remind you that perhaps the most valuable asset of the Vincent Chemical Company in this field is now its trademark ... and that it could not permit this asset to be challenged or imperilled."

In September 1932, Dr. Vincent, who had invented an analgesic toothpaste, founded a company Vincent's Products, Ltd., with a nominal capital of £1000, to manufacture and market this product. Dr. Vincent was originally appointed managing director, but died shortly after, and his widow Hilda A. Vincent (née Mills) was appointed in his place. In 1934 Vincent Chemical Co. sued Vincent's Products, Ltd. for infringement of their trademark. The court upheld the complaint and issued a limited injunction against the defendant from using that name in circumstances which might lead customers to believe the companies were associated, and awarded costs against Vincent's Products, Ltd.

Around 1936, Vincent's APC was first also marketed in "pocket-size" rectangular cans containing 24 tablets.

== Advertising slogans ==
- 1928: Take genuine Vincent's powders
- 1938: For safety's sake take Vincent's APC
- 1941: The same today as in 1917 ... Take Vincent's with confidence.
- 1950s: Take Vincent's with confidence for quick three-way relief Vincent's radio jingles (YouTube)
- late 1970s - "It's your day, don't share it with a headache! Vincents helps when you need help with pain." (sung)

== Phenacetin dropped ==
At some time before 1972 Vincent Chemical Co. replaced the phenacetin in the formulation of its powders and tablets with salicylamide. Compound analgesics were banned in Australia in 1979 due to analgesic nephropathy. Phenacetin, a pain-relieving and fever-reducing drug, was banned by the FDA in the US in 1983, due to its adverse effects, which include kidney damage (as shown by Dr. Priscilla Kincaid-Smith) and cancer. It was replaced in many other medications by its metabolite, paracetamol.

== See also ==
- Bex (compound analgesic)
