= P-Phenetidine =

p-Phenetidine

Names
- Preferred IUPAC name 4-Ethoxyaniline
- Other names para-Phenetidine; 4-Aminophenetole

Identifiers
CAS Number	156-43-4
3D model (JSmol)	Interactive image
ChEBI	CHEBI:85505
ChEMBL	ChEMBL250969
ChemSpider	21106155
ECHA InfoCard	100.005.324
EC Number	205-855-5
PubChem CID	9076
RTECS number	SI6465500
UNII	9TSL224ZSE
UN number	2311
CompTox Dashboard (EPA)	DTXSID0025864
- InChI: InChI=1S/C8H11NO/c1-2-10-8-5-3-7(9)4-6-8/h3-6H,2,9H2,1H3 Key: IMPPGHMHELILKG-UHFFFAOYSA-N
- SMILES: CCOc1ccc(N)cc1

Properties
Chemical formula	C_{8}H_{11}NO
Molar mass	137.182 g·mol^{−1}
Appearance	Colorless liquid; turns red to brown on exposure to air
Density	1.07 g/mL
Melting point	3 °C (37 °F; 276 K)
Boiling point	254 °C (489 °F; 527 K)
Solubility in water	20 g/L (20 °C)

Hazards
- GHS labelling
Pictograms	(GHS07: Exclamation mark) (GHS08: Health hazard)
Signal word	Warning
Hazard statements	H302, H312, H317, H319, H332, H341
Precautionary statements	P203, P261, P264, P264+P265, P270, P271, P272, P280, P301+P317, P302+P352, P304+P340, P305+P351+P338, P317, P318, P321, P330, P333+P317, P337+P317, P362+P364, P405, P501
Flash point	116 °C (241 °F; 389 K)
- Except where otherwise noted, data are given for materials in their standard state (at 25 °C [77 °F], 100 kPa). Infobox references

p-Phenetidine (4-ethoxyaniline) is a chemical compound with the molecular formula C_{8}H_{11}NO. It is one of the three isomers of phenetidine. It is used as an intermediate in the synthesis of pharmaceutical drugs, dyes, and the sweetener dulcin.

p-Phenetidine is a metabolite of the pharmaceutical drugs bucetin and phenacetin and of the preservative ethoxyquin. It is also used as a chemical intermediate in the manufacture of bucetin, phenacetin, ethoxyquin, and phenacaine.

p-Phenetidine has high renal toxicity and it is believed to be responsible for the adverse effects that led to the withdrawal of phenacetin and bucetin from pharmaceutical use. p-Phenetidine is also a possible mutagen.
