= Phenacaine =

Names
- IUPAC name (1E)-N,N′-Bis(4-ethoxyphenyl)ethanimidamide

Identifiers
CAS Number	101-93-9
3D model (JSmol)	Interactive image
ChEMBL	ChEMBL127123
ChemSpider	7307
PubChem CID	7588
UNII	V3M4D317W8
CompTox Dashboard (EPA)	DTXSID0046062
- InChI: InChI=1S/C18H22N2O2/c1-4-21-17-10-6-15(7-11-17)19-14(3)20-16-8-12-18(13-9-16)22-5-2/h6-13H,4-5H2,1-3H3,(H,19,20)
- SMILES: O(c1ccc(cc1)N\C(=N\c2ccc(OCC)cc2)C)CC

Properties
Chemical formula	C_{18}H_{22}N_{2}O_{2}
Molar mass	298.386 g·mol^{−1}
- Except where otherwise noted, data are given for materials in their standard state (at 25 °C [77 °F], 100 kPa). Infobox references

Phenacaine, also known as holocaine, is a local anesthetic. It is approved for ophthalmic use.

== Synthesis ==
The synthesis of phenacaine begins with the condensation of p-phenetidine (1) with triethyl orthoacetate (2) to afford the imino ether (a Pinner salt, 3). Reaction of that intermediate with a second equivalent of the aniline results (4) in a net displacement of ethanol, probably by an addition-elimination scheme, producing the amidine, phenacaine (5).

Synthesis:

In the patented synthesis, phenacetin was used as precursor. Treatment with phosphorus trichloride (PCl_{3}) gave the enol chloride, and reaction of this intermediate with p-phenetidine then completed the synthesis of phenacaine.
