= Priscilla Kincaid-Smith =

South African-born Australian physician and medical researcher

- Born: 30 November 1926; Johannesburg, South Africa
- Died: 18 July 2015 (aged 88); Melbourne, Australia
- Education: University of the Witwatersrand
- Occupations: Renal Physician & Researcher
- Spouse: Ken Fairley
- Children: 3

Priscilla Sheath Kincaid-Smith, Mrs. Fairley, AC, CBE (30 November 1926 – 18 July 2015), was an Australia-based South African physician and researcher, specializing in nephrology. She was a President of the Royal Australasian College of Physicians (1986–1988; first woman Councillor in 1976), World Medical Association and International Society of Nephrology (1972–75).

== Early life and education ==
Priscilla Sheath Kincaid-Smith was born in Johannesburg, 30 November 1926, where she studied medical science at the University of the Witwatersrand. She earned her BSc (Hons) in 1946 and her BMBS (Bachelor of Medicine, Bachelor of Surgery) in 1950. She was awarded a DSc by the University of the Witwatersrand in 1979.

== Career ==
From 1951 to 1953, she worked at Baragwanath Hospital in Johannesburg, holding resident positions in Medicine and Surgery and Registrar in Medicine.

In the early 1960s, Kincaid-Smith demonstrated evidence of the links between headache powders containing phenacetin (sold as Bex and Vincent's APC in Australia) and kidney cancer, and campaigned strongly against the use of such powders. She also contributed to research on links between high blood pressure and renal malfunction. Her career also included the positions of Director of Nephrology, Royal Melbourne Hospital (1967–91); Professor of Medicine, University of Melbourne (1975–91); and Physician in Nephrology, Royal Women's Hospital, Melbourne (1976–91)

Kincaid-Smith was President of the Royal Australasian College of Physicians (1986–88), as well as past president of the World Medical Association, and International Society of Nephrology. She was a Member of the Walter and Eliza Hall Institute.

== Personal life ==
Kincaid-Smith met Dr Ken Fairley in May 1958. They got engaged in June and married in July. They moved to Australia at the end of the year when both were aged 31. He had spent four years in London, training in cardiology with Paul Wood at the National Heart Hospital, and was just about to return to Australia when they met. They had three children, the twin boys Stephen and Christopher, who became a gastroenterologist and an infectious disease epidemiologist. Their later-born daughter, Jacinth, studied veterinary medicine and joined the Pharmaceutical industry and where she worked as an executive and longstanding CEO. Their offspring produced eight grandchildren.

Ken's father and all his father's four brothers were doctors. One of his uncles was Sir Neil Hamilton Fairley, famous in the field of malaria. The family was Australian-based, but Neil became professor at the Tropical School in London. His two sons also became doctors, of whom Gordon was killed by an Irish bomb in 1975.

== Death ==
Kincaid-Smith died on 18 July 2015, aged 88, surrounded by family at her home in Melbourne, Australia from complications following a stroke.

== Leadership and Advocacy ==
She held several pioneering leadership roles:

- First female president of the Royal Australasian College of Physicians and First woman councilor of RACP.
- First Australian president of the World Medical Association from1994 - 1995
- Commissioner of the Commonwealth Serum Laboratories from 1987- 1990
- Advocacy on issues like pain medication policy and birth control as a basic right for women.

== Research and contributions ==
Kincaid-Smith identified an association between long-term use of phenacetin-containing analgesic medications, including widely used products such as Bex and Vincent's powders, and the development of chronic kidney disease. Her research findings, together with her public advocacy, influenced medical practice and regulatory policy in Australia and contributed to a decline in cases of analgesic nephropa.

== Awards ==
- 14 June 1975, appointed Commander of the Order of the British Empire "for services to medicine".
- 1989, David Hume Award from the National Kidney Foundation (USA).
- 1989, Companion of the Order of Australia.
- 2001, Victorian Honour Roll of Women.

== Publications ==
She has published journal articles and books, these include:

- Renal Infection and Renal Scarring (1971)
- The Kidney (1974)
