= TMQ =

TMQ may refer to:

- Translated Meaning of the Qur'an, commonly used after quotations from the Quran appended with the relevant chapter (Surah) and verse (ayat) numbers. (Also used is "EMQ" or English Meaning of Quran)
- Tuesday Morning Quarterback, a column on American football for ESPN by Gregg Easterbrook
- Trademark of Quality, a bootleg record label.
- 2,2,4-Trimethyl-1,2-dihydroquinoline, an antioxidant used in rubber
- Thousand Cubic Metres, a unit of measure.
