= John McKellar (writer) =

Australian theatrical writer

- Born: John Alan McKellar; 13 August 1930; Orange, New South Wales, Australia
- Died: 6 September 2010 (aged 80); Sacred Heart Hospice, Darlinghurst, Australia
- Education: Sydney Teachers College
- Occupation: Writer
- Writing career
- Period: 1953–2006
- Genres: Comedy revue, musical theatre
- Subject: Social satire
- Notable work: A Cup of Tea, a Bex and a Good Lie Down

John Alan McKellar (13 August 1930 – 6 September 2010) was an Australian writer, primarily of comedy revues or musical theatre. His most critically acclaimed and popularly attended work was A Cup of Tea, a Bex and a Good Lie Down which premiered at Sydney's Phillip Street Theatre on 18 September 1965 and ran for more than 250 performances. He was the resident writer at that theatre in the 1950s and 1960s. In the 1970s he provided the slogan, "The drink you have when you're not having a drink" to advertise Claytons non-alcoholic beverages. Most of his humour involved social satire where typical self-mockery was developed into an art form. Some of his works provided vernacular phrases used in Australian English including "is Australia really necessary", "A Cup of Tea, a Bex and a Good Lie Down", and "But I wouldn't want to live there".

== Biography ==
McKellar was born on 13 August 1930 in Orange to Rupert McKellar, a commercial traveller, and Winifred née Lehman. He grew up with his sister Margaret and brother Clive in Waverley. McKellar was educated at St Charles School and Waverley College – run by the Christian Brothers. At the same school were two of his neighbours, Jerry Donovan and Lance Mulcahy and when McKellar attended Sydney Teachers College, Donovan and Mulcahy were enrolled at the adjacent Sydney University. McKellar worked as a teacher before returning to Sydney to become a full-time writer. The trio collaborated for university productions of musicals, with McKellar writing lyrics.

On 12 February 1953, McKellar, Donovan and Mulcahy wrote and/or performed a musical revue, Metropolitan Merry-Go-Round, for their professional debut at the Metropolitan Theatre in Kings Cross. It was produced by William Orr, who subsequently established the Phillip Street Theatre which show-cased works by McKellar. Further revues followed and then, in 1955, the trio travelled to the United Kingdom where they wrote sketches and material for cabarets. McKellar returned to Phillip Street Theatre and became its resident writer. From 1964 McKellar periodically travelled to the United States attempting to stage a Broadway production. From February to April 1965, Is Australia Really Necessary?, was staged at the Tivoli Theatre, Melbourne with McKellar providing lyrics. The title provided a vernacular phrase in Australian English.

On 18 September 1965, his play, A Cup of Tea, a Bex and a Good Lie Down, premiered at Phillip Street Theatre and ran for more than 250 performances. The cast included John Ewart, Gloria Dawn, Ruth Cracknell and Reg Livermore. McKellar's play popularised the phrase, "A Cup of Tea, a Bex and a Good Lie Down", which "quickly became a common Australian saying". The play is McKellar's most critically acclaimed and popularly attended work.

In the 1970s, he provided the slogan, "The drink you have when you're not having a drink" to advertise Claytons non-alcoholic beverages. McKellar moved to the US and became involved in antique textiles, setting up a business there for almost 20 years. In 1981 McKellar reconnected with Mulcahy for a musical-comedy, Keystone, which was composed by Mulcahy with book by McKellar who also co-wrote the lyrics with Dion McGregor. In January 1982 it was performed at the McCarter Theater in Princeton. The New York Times reviewer Mel Gussow found it "an intimate vest-pocket musical ... smallness leads to some novel double-teaming". Overall Gussow was disappointed as "the approach demands a much keener sense of style and of comedy than is demonstrated ... [o]n a very basic level, Keystone is just not funny enough".

In 1996, McKellar returned to Australia where he wrote and directed a play, Virtual unReality, which was performed in May at the Tilbury Hotel, Woolloomooloo. In December 2006, he wrote Attack of the Granny Boomers, which was performed at the Parade Theatre, Kensington. McKellar died on 6 September 2010, aged 80 years. Most of his humour involved social satire where typical self-mockery was developed into an art form.
