= Ethoxyquin =

- Ethoxyquin

Names
- Preferred IUPAC name 6-Ethoxy-2,2,4-trimethyl-1,2-dihydroquinoline

Identifiers
CAS Number	91-53-2
3D model (JSmol)	Interactive image
ChEBI	CHEBI:77323
ChEMBL	ChEMBL172064
ChemSpider	3177
ECHA InfoCard	100.001.887
E number	E324 (antioxidants, ...)
PubChem CID	3293
UNII	9T1410R4OR
CompTox Dashboard (EPA)	DTXSID9020582
- InChI: InChI=1S/C14H19NO/c1-5-16-11-6-7-13-12(8-11)10(2)9-14(3,4)15-13/h6-9,15H,5H2,1-4H3 Key: DECIPOUIJURFOJ-UHFFFAOYSA-N; InChI=1/C14H19NO/c1-5-16-11-6-7-13-12(8-11)10(2)9-14(3,4)15-13/h6-9,15H,5H2,1-4H3 Key: DECIPOUIJURFOJ-UHFFFAOYAT
- SMILES: O(c2ccc1c(\C(=C/C(N1)(C)C)C)c2)CC

Properties
Chemical formula	C_{14}H_{19}NO
Molar mass	217.312 g·mol^{−1}
Melting point	< 25 °C (77 °F; 298 K)
Boiling point	123–125 °C (253–257 °F; 396–398 K) at 2 mmHg
- Except where otherwise noted, data are given for materials in their standard state (at 25 °C [77 °F], 100 kPa). verify (what is ?) Infobox references

Ethoxyquin (EMQ) is a quinoline-based antioxidant used as a food preservative in certain countries and originally to control scald on pears after harvest (under commercial names such as "Stop-Scald"). It is used as a preservative in some pet foods to slow the development of rancidity of fats. Ethoxyquin is also used in some spices to prevent color loss due to oxidation of the natural carotenoid pigments. It has been used as a fire retardant for fish meal since the 1960s.

== Regulation ==
Ethoxyquin was initially registered as a pesticide in 1965 as an antioxidant used as a deterrent of scald in pears through post-harvest indoor application via a drench and/or impregnated wrap.

As an antioxidant to control the browning of pears, ethoxyquin is approved in the United States and in the European Union.

In the United States, it is approved for use as an animal feed additive and is limited as a food additive to use only in the spices chili powder, paprika, and ground chili. Ethoxyquin is not permitted for use as food additive in Australia nor within the European Union.

Ethoxyquin is allowed in the fishing industry in Norway and France as a feed stabilizer, so is commonly used in food pellets fed to farmed salmon.

Norway made this practice illegal when the EU suspended authorization in 2017 and in accordance with the suspension utilized a transition period which allowed the sale of feed containing ethoxyquin until December 31, 2019, after this date it was illegal to sell feed containing ethoxyquin. Feed containing ethoxyquin had to be used by June 20, 2020.

Ethoxyquin is used in pellets fed to chickens on chicken farms.

In 2017, the EU suspended authorization for use as a feed additive, with various dates between 2017 and 2019 for final allowance of sale of goods so that alternatives may be phased in.

By 1976, the U.S. Coast Guard required ethoxyquin treatment on fish meal shipments, to prevent fires, and in 1979, the United Nations organization overseeing maritime cargo recommended fish meal be treated with it “to prevent spontaneous combustion.”

== Safety ==
Some speculation exists that ethoxyquin in pet foods might be responsible for multiple health problems. To date, the U.S. Food and Drug Administration has only found a verifiable connection between ethoxyquin and buildup of protoporphyrin IX in the liver, as well as elevations in liver-related enzymes in some animals, but no health consequences from these effects are known. In 1997, the Center for Veterinary Medicine asked pet food manufacturers to voluntarily limit ethoxyquin levels to 75 ppm until further evidence is reported. However, most pet foods that contain ethoxyquin have never exceeded this amount.

In 2017, reports from the Swiss Department for regional affairs laboratory, service of consummation and veterinary affairs showed that farmed salmon often exceeded the set limits for ethoxyquin contamination by several orders of magnitude and that health effects of the chemical on the human body were not studied in sufficient detail. In 2013, researchers at the Department of General Genetics, Molecular Biology and Plant Biotechnology, Faculty of Biology and Environmental Protection, University of Łódź, Poland, summarized the health effects of animals and humans exposed to varying levels of ethoxyquin observed in scientific studies. The summary includes: loss of weight, changes in liver, kidney, alimentary duct, urinary bladder and mitochondria, anemia, lethargy, discolored urine, skin, or fur, increase in mortality, detrimental effect on immunity, condition factor of final body weight in relation to body length of fish and inducement of allergies (contact exposure).

=== 2015 EFSA review ===
A 2015 review by the European Food Safety Authority indicated that data to assess the safety of ethoxyquin as a feed additive for target animals, or its safety for consumers and the environment are lacking. The agency found one of its metabolites, ethoxyquin quinone imine, to be possibly genotoxic, and p-phenetidine, an impurity that could be present from the manufacturing process, to be possibly mutagenic. In response, feed manufacturers have taken steps to significantly reduce the amount of p-phenetidine in their products.

== See also ==
- Roxarsone
- 2,2,4-Trimethyl-1,2-dihydroquinoline - a structurally related antioxidant used in rubber
