= Australian Hall =

Heritage-listed community building in Sydney, Australia

Australian Hall (Cyprus–Hellene Club)
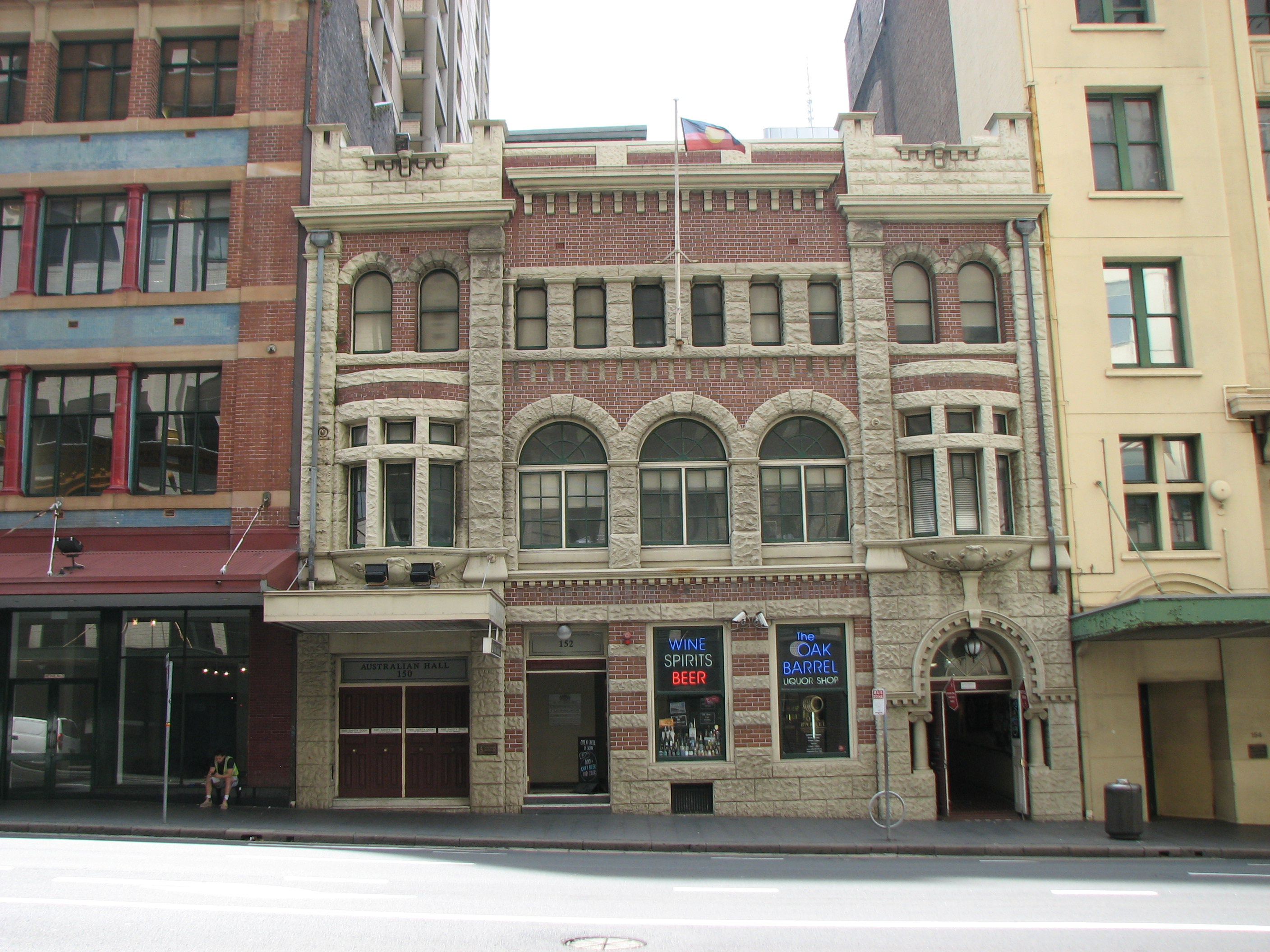
- Australian Hall

- Location within Sydney Location within Australia
- 33.8779°S 151.2098°E
- Location: 150–152 Elizabeth Street, Sydney CBD, City of Sydney, New South Wales, Australia

History
- Built: 1910–1913
- Built for: Concordia German Club

Site notes
- Architectural styles: Federation Romanesque style; Federation Free Style
- Owner: Indigenous Land Corporation

Australian National Heritage List
- Official name: Cyprus Hellene Club - Australian Hall
- Type: Listed place (Indigenous)
- Designated: 20 May 2008
- Reference no.: 105937

New South Wales Heritage Register
- Official name: Cyprus-Hellene Club; Australian Hall; Aboriginal Day of Mourning Site; Concord Club;
- Type: State heritage (built)
- Criteria: a., b., d., f.
- Designated: 2 April 1999
- Reference no.: 773
- Type: Hall Public
- Category: Aboriginal
- Builders: J. Ptolemy

The Australian Hall is a heritage-listed community building located at 150–152 Elizabeth Street, in the Sydney central business district, in New South Wales, Australia. It was the site of the Day of Mourning protests by Aboriginal Australians on 26 January 1938. It was also known as the Cyprus–Hellene Club until 1998. The property is owned by the Indigenous Land Corporation, a statutory corporation of the Australian Government. It was added to the Australian National Heritage List on 20 May 2008 and was added to the New South Wales State Heritage Register on 2 April 1999.

== History ==
The building that houses the Australian Hall was erected in 1910–1913 for the Concordia German Club. It was purchased in 1920 by the Knights of the Southern Cross, a Catholic fraternal lay group linked with the Catholic Right. In 1922 the name of the hall in the building was changed from Miss Bishop's Hall to the Australian Hall.

=== Phillip Theatre 1961–1974 ===
The next significant change to the site on Elizabeth Street was the Phillip (Street) Theatre. In 1961 the Australian Hall was renovated and the interior of the building remodelled to turn it into a theatre capable of seating 453 with a raised area at the back to give a balcony effect. The Phillip Theatre broke away from traditional Australian theatre and became a significant force in Australian Theatrical History.

=== Cinema 1974—1998 ===
In the early 1970s the theatre was the only exclusively live theatre remaining in the city but it was hard to find shows suitable for a venue of its size. The site became the Rivoli Cinema in 1974. Changes were made to the auditorium and foyer to make it more of a cinema rather than a live theatre venue. With Haymarket being identified with the Chinese community, the Rivoli was let to Chinese interests who reopened in 1976 as the Mandarin Cinema, showing Chinese language films and in 1989 the Australian Hall became the home of the Mandolin Cinema.

=== Cyprus–Hellenic Club 1979–1998 ===
The Knights of the Southern Cross sold the building in 1979 to the Hellenic Club and it was then used by Greek Cypriots as the Cyprus Hellene Club, a Greek organisation offering cultural and social links for its members. The club was and still is instrumental in promoting and maintaining the Cypriot culture in Australia. The Cyprus Club and use of the building were directly connected with the Greek Orthodox Archdiocese of Australia in the support of charitable organisations, particularly those associated with the Greek Welfare Centre. The Cyprus Club owned the property until 1998. Similarly to previous owners, the Cyprus–Hellenic Club used the premises for cultural and social activities while still sub-letting the old hall, which continued as a cinema with various owners and names until 1988. Over the years, the building accommodated a restaurant, dining and community facilities and the interior of the building was altered on a number of occasions.

It was the site (as the then Hellenic Club) of the first national conference of the Australian Labor Party, called the "Inter-Colonial Conference of Labour" held in January 1900, which formally established a federal party and platform, and adopted the "maintenance of a White Australia" and the "total exclusion of coloured and other undesirable races" as the first plank in the new federal party's "fighting platform" and its "general platform".

It was the location of the 26th National Conference of the Australian Labor Party in 1965, when the White Australia policy was abolished from the ALP platform.

In the early 1990s the owner of the Cyprus Hellene Club planned to demolish most of the building and erect a 34-storey residential development. This proposal started a campaign by Indigenous people and the National Aboriginal History and Heritage Council to protect the building and gain recognition of the significance of the building to Indigenous people for its association with the Day of Mourning.

=== Indigenous community ownership ===
After several years of inquiries and objections, the NSW Minister for Urban Affairs and Planning made a Permanent Conservation Order over parts of the building. In 1998 the Indigenous Land Corporation, a Commonwealth statutory authority, purchased the building on behalf of the Metropolitan Aboriginal Association Inc, who now manages the building.

=== History of the Day of Mourning ===
Since European settlement, Indigenous Australians have been treated differently to the general Australian population; denied the basic concession of equality with whites and rarely given full protection before the law. Indigenous people have long resisted and protested against European settlement of their country. Early protests were initiated by residents of missions and reserves as a result of local issues and took the form of letters, petitions and appeals.

One of the earliest examples of this form of protest was during the mid 1840s at the Aboriginal reserve called Wybalenna on Flinders Island. Residents of Wybalenna sent letters and petitions to Queen Victoria and the Colonial Secretary and other Government officials, protesting against the living conditions and administration of Wybalenna. Similarly in the mid 1870s residents of Coranderrk in Victoria began a decade long protest against the management and closure of the reserve using letters to the editors of daily newspapers and government ministers as well as seeking support from humanitarian organisations.

This pattern of protests focusing on local concerns continued during the 1880s and 1890s with residents of Cummeragunja in New South Wales and Poonindie in South Australia also using letters and petitions to lobby for the allocation of parcels of land within the reserve to families so that they would be responsible for farming their allocated parcel.

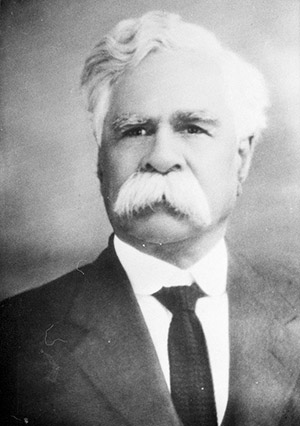
William Cooper

A new dynamic began in the late 1920s with the creation of regional and state based Aboriginal controlled organisations. The first of these was the short lived Australian Aboriginal Progressive Association (AAPA), founded on the mid north coast of New South Wales (NSW) by Fred Maynard. Subsequent state based organisations were formed in NSW with the Aborigines Progressive Association (APA) and in Victoria with the Aboriginal Advancement League (AAL). Key founders of these organisations included William Cooper, Doug Nicholls, Margaret Tucker, William Ferguson, Jack Patten and Pearl Gibbs.

The key members of both these organisations shared common life experiences; they grew up on missions or reserves controlled by protection boards but were either expelled on disciplinary grounds or left to find work. The majority of these people had at one time resided at Cummeragunja and/or Warrangesda missions in NSW and a number also had lived at Salt Pan Creek, an Aboriginal squatter's camp south-west of Sydney. This camp housed refugee families, the dispossessed and people seeking to escape the harsh and brutal policies of the Aborigines Protection Board. It became a focal point for intensifying Aboriginal resistance in NSW.

While living off an Aboriginal reserve provided some level of freedom, these Aboriginal people experienced the full force of laws that impacted on the ability of Indigenous people to find employment, receive equal wages, seek unemployment relief and the ability to purchase or own property. The experience of living under the control of a protection board on a mission or reserve, and the barriers they faced off these reserves, united the members of these early Aboriginal organisations in their concerns for the lack of civil rights, the growth in the Aboriginal Protection Board's powers and the condition of people remaining in missions and reserves.

It was in this environment that in November 1937 William Cooper called a meeting of the AAL in Melbourne which William Ferguson from the APA also attended. During this meeting the two groups agreed to hold a protest conference in Sydney to coincide with sesquicentenary celebrations planned for Australia Day 26 January 1938. They decided to call this protest the Day of Mourning.

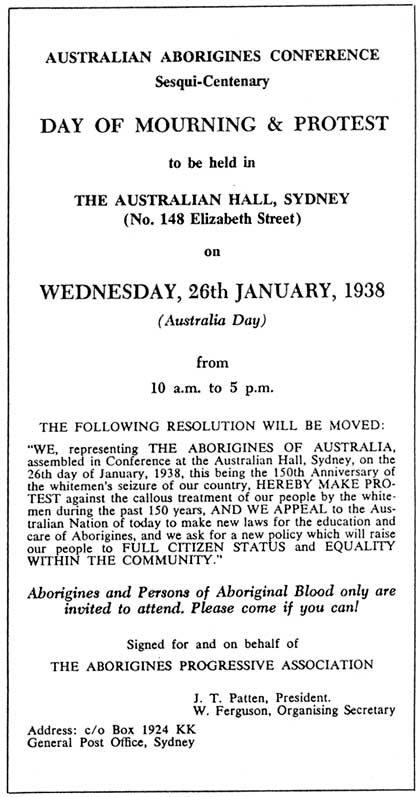
Poster promoting the Day of Mourning, 1938

The AAL and APA widely promoted the Day of Mourning through radio interviews and other media. To encourage Aboriginal people to attend, Jack Patten and William Ferguson took turns in touring the reserves to promote it. Jack Patten and William Ferguson also published a 12-page pamphlet entitled "Aborigines Claim Citizen Rights" to promote the purpose of the Day of Mourning amongst non-Indigenous people. This "manifesto" has been described as perhaps the most bitter of Aboriginal protests. It explained the significance of the action:

"The 26th January, 1938, is not a day of rejoicing for Australia's Aborigines; it is a day of mourning. This festival of 150 years' so-called 'progress' in Australia commemorates also 150 years of misery and degradation imposed upon the original native inhabitants by the white invaders of this country. We, representing the Aborigines, now ask you, the reader of this appeal, to pause in the midst of your sesqui-centenary rejoicings and ask yourself honestly whether your "conscience" is clear in regard to the treatment of the Australian blacks by the Australian whites during the period of 150 years' history which you celebrate?"

The pamphlet asked the reader to acknowledge the impact of the "protection" approach, the restrictions that it continued to place on Aboriginal people's rights, and to be proud of the Australian Aborigines and not misled by the superstition that they are a naturally backward and low race. It also made explicit that the choice of holding the Day of Mourning on Australia Day, the national holiday celebrating the arrival of the First Fleet and the birth of Australia as a nation, was to highlight the exclusion of Aboriginal people from the Australian nation:

"We ask you white Australians for justice, fair play and decency, and we speak for 80,000 human beings in your midst. We ask—and we have every right to demand—that you should include us, fully and equally with yourselves, in the body of the Australian nation".

The organisers distributed approximately 2,000 leaflets and posters advertising the Day of Mourning which advised that "Aborigines and persons of Aboriginal blood only are invited to attend". The organisers were denied permission to hold the Day of Mourning in Sydney Town Hall, but were able to rent the Australia Hall at 150-152 Elizabeth Street. The use of Australia Hall was granted on condition that the delegates watched the sesquicentennial parade from the Town Hall steps and then marched behind the parade to the Australian Hall.

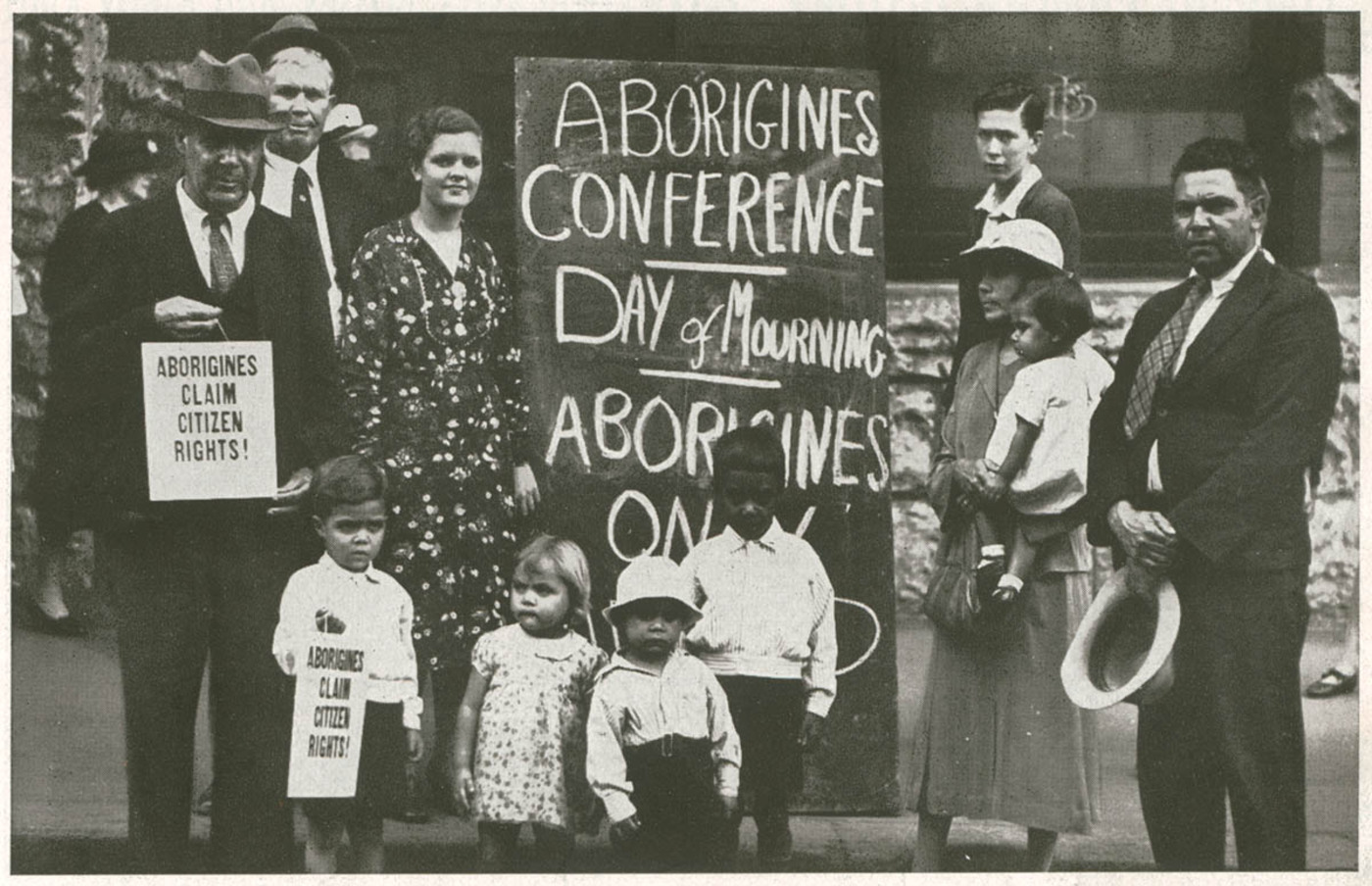
A blackboard displayed outside the hall proclaims, "Day of Mourning"

The official Australia Day celebrations included a re-enactment of the arrival of Governor Phillip by boat at Port Jackson "who will put the Aborigines to flight". The Government had brought in Aboriginal people from the Menindee reserve to participate in the re-enactment of the arrival of Governor Phillip at Port Jackson as this was a safer option then using Aboriginal people from the Sydney area. These people were housed at the Redfern Police Barracks and were not allowed any contact with "disruptive influences" before the re-enactment.

While delegates did not watch the re-enactment, they were required to watch a pageant at the Sydney Town Hall. After watching this pageant, delegates for the Day of Mourning walked to Australia Hall. Two police officers guarded the front door of the building. The Day of Mourning was held at a time when there were restrictions on Aboriginal people's rights of movement and assembly and the delegates from reserves risked imprisonment, expulsion from their homes and loss of their jobs for participating in an event such as this. As a result, some entered through the back door of the building to avoid identification and reprisals.

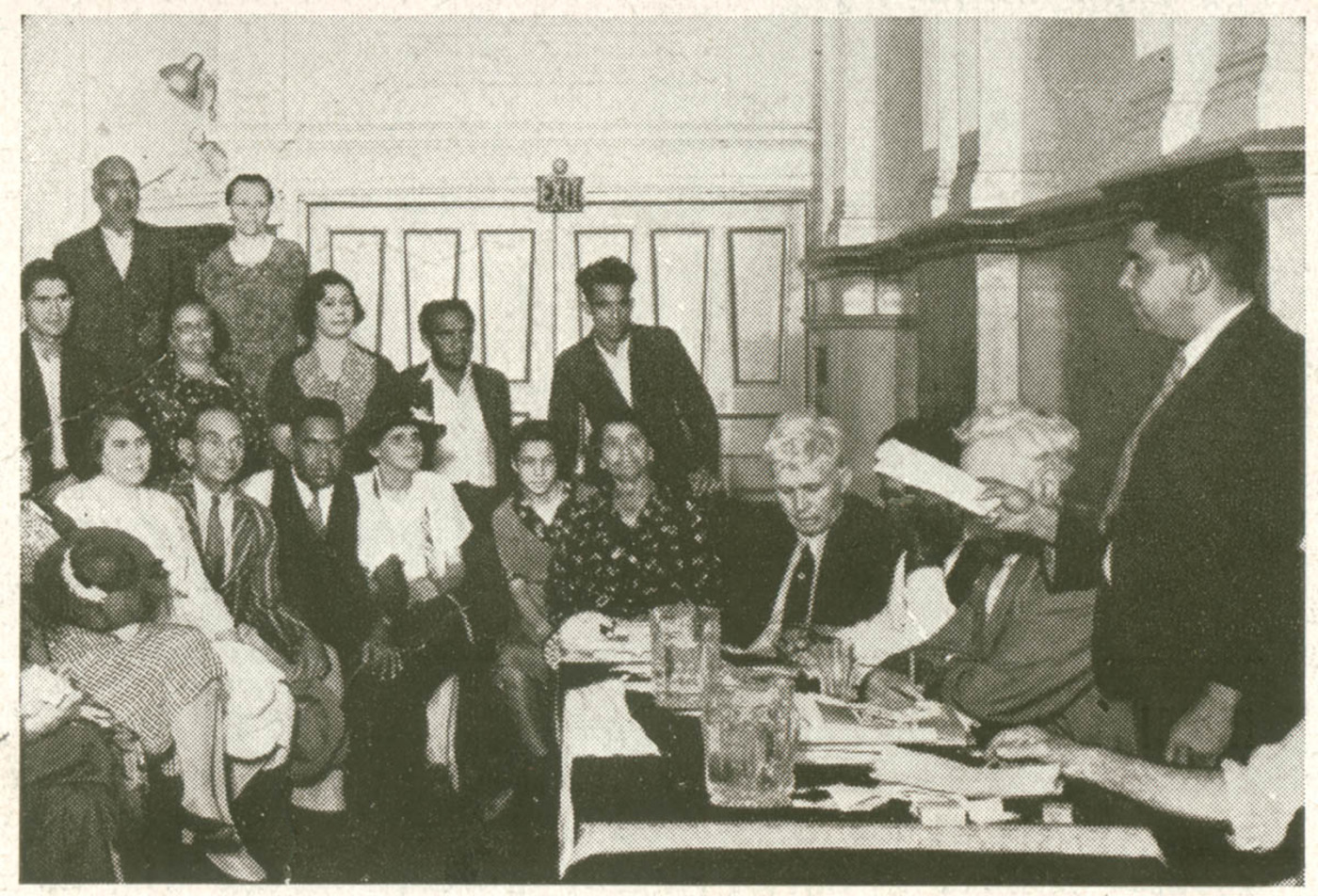
The Aboriginal meeting in Australian Hall

Over 100 people attended the Day of Mourning from throughout NSW, Victoria and Queensland. Telegrams of support for this action also came from Western Australia, Queensland and north Australia, which the organisers believed gave the gathering the status and strength of a national action.

After a number of statements by participants, they unanimously endorsed a resolution demanding full citizen rights:

"WE, representing THE ABORIGINES OF AUSTRALIA, assembled in conference at the Australian Hall, Sydney, on the 26th day of January 1938, this being the 150th Anniversary of the Whiteman's seizure of our country, HEREBY MAKE PROTEST against the callous treatment of our people by the whitemen during the past 150 years, AND WE APPEAL to the Australian nation of today to make new laws for the education and care of Aborigines, and we ask for a new policy which will raise our people to FULL CITIZEN STATUS and EQUALITY WITHIN THE COMMUNITY".

On 31 January 1938, a delegation presented this resolution, and a ten-point policy statement developed at the Day of Mourning, to the Prime Minister and the Minister for the Interior. Participants described the ten-point policy statement as the only policy which has the support of the Aborigines themselves. It included a long range policy with recommendations for: Australian Government control of all Aboriginal affairs; the development of a national policy for Aborigines; the appointment of a Commonwealth Minister for Aboriginal Affairs whose aim would be to raise all Aborigines throughout Australian to full citizen status and civil equality with the whites in Australia. The latter included entitlement to: the same educational opportunities; the benefits of labor legislation, including Arbitration Court Awards, workers' compensation and insurance; receiving wages in cash, and not by orders, issue of rations, or apprenticeship systems; old-age and invalid pensions; to own land and property, and to be allowed to save money in personal banking accounts.

The long range policy also identified the need for Aboriginal land settlements including tuition in areas of agriculture and financial assistance to generate self-supporting Aboriginal farmers. While opposing a policy of segregation, it advocated the retention of Aboriginal Reserves as a sanctuary for some Aboriginal people.

A full report of the Day of Mourning appeared in the first issue of the monthly Australian Abo Call, the first newspaper published by Aboriginal people to voice their views. It stated:

"The Day of Mourning protest conference on 26 January 1938 at the Australia Hall marks the first occasion in Australian history that Aboriginal people from different states joined together to campaign for equality and full citizenship rights. Initiated and organised by key figures in two of the early Aboriginal political protest organisations, the Australian Aborigines League and the Aborigines Progressive Association, delegates joined to discuss civil rights and debate a ten-point list of demands aimed at redressing the political and legal disadvantages of Aboriginal people".

Although it brought about little change in the years immediately following 1938, the Day of Mourning produced a comprehensive collection of key policies that identified impacts on the lives of Aboriginal people at the time and recommendations for how they should be addressed. One of the issues highlighted in these policies, namely Australian Government control of all Aboriginal affairs, formed the basis for the constitutional amendments endorsed by the Australian people in the Referendum of the 27 May 1967. While there has been progress, governments still identify the broad issues raised in these documents as priority areas within Indigenous Affairs (see Ministerial Taskforce on Indigenous Affairs long term vision in Office of Indigenous Policy Coordination 2004; issues identified in Bilateral Agreements between Commonwealth and States/Territories at www.oipc.gov.au/publications/default.asp).

A number of contemporary Indigenous leaders also recognise that the key policy issues identified at the Day of Mourning remain relevant to Indigenous people today. In a speech at the Australian Reconciliation Convention, Noel Pearson (1997) noted that after reading the documents associated with the Day of Mourning he "was struck either how sophisticated the movement was back then, or how far we have not come" because the issues raised in the material from the Day of Mourning remained fresh propositions. In an article published in a number of metropolitan newspapers on Australia Day in 1998, Gatjil Djerrkura noted that while advances have been made in relation to Indigenous affairs since the Day of Mourning, many of the underlying issues remain, including improvements to the health and economic opportunities in communities.

The call at the Day of Mourning for recognition of "full citizen status" and "equality within the community" still recurs in the numerous government reports including those of the Human Rights Commission, the Social Justice Commissioner, the Aboriginal and Torres Strait Islander Commissions and the Council for Aboriginal Reconciliation, as well as the Indigenous statements such as the Yirrkala Bark Petition, the Barunga Statement, the Eva Valley Statement and the Boomanulla Oval Statement.

The Day of Mourning not only produced political statements that remain current, it also highlighted the exclusion of Indigenous people from the Australian nation. The ambiguous relationship between Indigenous people and the Australian nation remains an issue for Indigenous people. As a result, Indigenous people have continued to use Australia Day and other foundation anniversaries to draw attention to their exclusion from the national consciousness: in 1970 a second Day of Mourning was held to demonstrate against Sydney's bicentenary celebrations of Captain Cook's "discovery" of Australia; Australia Day in 1972 saw the establishment of an Aboriginal Tent Embassy on the lawns of the then Parliament House in Canberra (now Old Parliament House) in a call for national land rights, sovereignty and self-determination; and the anti-bicentenary protests on Australia Day in 1988 is still one of the largest Indigenous protest marches in Australia.

In the 1930s demanding the same rights as white Australians, when Indigenous people were subject to severe restrictions and punitive sanctions, constituted a radical claim in Australia and challenged the premise of the dominant racial order. The Day of Mourning is therefore regarded as one of the most important moments in the history of the Indigenous resistance in the early 20th century.

== Description ==
The Cyprus Hellene Club - Australian Hall is located at 150-152 Elizabeth Street, Sydney.

The Cyprus Hellene Club, the building which houses Australia Hall, is a three-storey masonry building in the Federation Romanesque style with the use of rusticated stone dressings. The building originally formed part of a Federation period streetscape group known as the Elizabeth Street Precinct. The entire building, although internally altered over the years, remains substantially intact. The symmetrical facade to Elizabeth Street has bold modelling and textures, due to its semi-circular arches, segmental oriel windows and rock faced stonework.

The former Australia Hall occupies the rear of the first floor; its interior and that of the entrance lobby and foyer both retain original Classical decorative elements possibly dating from the 1920s. The front entrance and back door survive intact.

Exterior

The building was constructed on the full site area, has three storeys above ground and a basement and has facades to Elizabeth Street and Nithsdale Street. The Elizabeth Street facade has a suspended steel awning above which fabric is intact. The facade has the characteristics of Federation Free Style as identified by Apperley, Irving and Reynolds. In consistency with the style it features two contrasting materials, face brick and rusticated sandstone. The sandstone has all been painted and the brick left unpainted. There are three entrances. The cinema entrance has marble steps and timber floors which are glazed. The club entrance has terrazzo steps with aluminium edge strip. The club doors are of solid timber. The fire exit, constructed during the 1980s has white terrazzo steps and standard fire door. The Nithsdale Street facade walling is rendered and painted. The two windows at the second floor have segmental arched face brick heads. Two windows behind the Mandolin cinema screen and part of the opening which was probably a fire exit or receiving dock have been bricked up. The roof is corrugated asbestos above the western part of the building and corrugated iron above the hall.

Interior

The basement extends for half the depth of the building and the ground along the northern and southern site boundaries is un-excavated at basement level. The ground and first floors extend the full depth of the site with the former Australian Hall occupying the rear half of the first floor. Main access to the hall if from Elizabeth Street. The second floor extends for half the depth of the site. Two isolated stairs and one lift provide access to all levels of the building. The lift dates from the 1960s alteration. The stair has terrazzo steps. The other fire stair, located in the former light-well, was constructed in the mid-1980s and has tiled steps.

Basement

The basement comprises store rooms, cool rooms and toilets. Cool rooms and store rooms have cement floors and cement rendered walls. Although the spatial arrangement and much of the visible fabric date from later alterations, some wall sections appear to be original.

Ground Floor

The main entry to the former Cyprus-Hellenic Club opens into a foyer and reception office. The major part of the ground floor is occupied by a large bar/club with games area and a restaurant/auditorium with a small stage and dance floor. Also located on this floor is a kitchen, cool room, toilets, storeroom and an exit passage to Nithsdale Street. The club premises were completely refitted in the mid-1980s and most of the finishes date from this latest alteration. Original elements include the plastered and painted side walls, recessed alcoves and original ceiling panels. The main spaces on the ground floor have carpeted floors while the cinema entrance foyer features black and white lino tile flooring, papered wall and decorative plastered ceiling with cornice and brackets.

First Floor

The front part of the first floor comprises the board room, snooker room, bar area, a small kitchen and toilets. Original elements surviving timber floor structure, the arched and square timber windows to Elizabeth Street and joinery such as frames, shashes, architraves and surviving skirtings. The rear part of the first floor is occupied by the Mandolin Cinema, the former Australian Hall. The cinema is accessible by a narrow foyer which is adjacent to the northern wall of the building. The first floor cinema foyer and amenities retained much of their original features such as the original floor structure, marble stair and billboard frames. The ceiling, cornice frieze and ceiling roses appear to be original too. The former dance hall, which was adapted to the use as a theatre in 1961 and to the cinema use in 1974, retains much of its original fabric. These are the wall fabric to external walls, the surviving original wall detailing such as blind arches and remaining wall decoration, hidden behind false walling and the suspended ceiling. Other original elements include the timber floor structure, windows in the rear wall, mouldings, skirtings and architraves. However, nothing remains of the original stage.

Second Floor

The second floor is occupied by a large function room, toilets at the rear, a kitchen and an unused board room along the northern boundary wall. Surviving original fabric includes timber floor structure, original wall surfaces along the southern and northern walls, timber windows, window joinery, architraves and skirtings. The acoustic tiled suspended ceiling above the board room is ruined. Similarly to the first floor, the finishes and fit out of the toilets dates from an earlier (1970s) alteration.

=== Condition ===
The building is in a good condition. Modifications to the interior of the building have not affected its heritage significance in connection to the Day of Mourning. The front of the ground floor has undergone modernisation and has a suspended awning.

== Heritage listing ==
=== Australian National Heritage List ===
Since European settlement, Indigenous people have been treated differently to the general Australian population; denied the basic concession of equality and rarely given full protection before the law. While Indigenous groups have long resisted and protested against this inequality, up until the 1920s these protests were generally focused on local issues.

Cyprus Hellene Club - Australian Hall was listed on the Australian National Heritage List on 20 May 2008 having satisfied the following criteria.

Criterion A: Events, Processes

Coinciding with the 1938 sesquicentenary celebrations for Australia Day, members of the Aboriginal Advancement League and the Aboriginal Progressive Association held the first national Indigenous protest, the Day of Mourning, to highlight that the "150 years" so-called "progress" in Australia commemorates also 150 years of misery and degradation imposed upon the original native inhabitants by the white invaders of this country'. The Day of Mourning identified a significant collection of policy issues impacting on Indigenous people and proposed recommendations for addressing these issues through government action. While there has been some progress, generally the political statements and social issues identified from the Day of Mourning are still relevant to Indigenous people today. Australia Hall, as the site of the Day of Mourning, is outstanding in the course of Australia's cultural history as the first national Indigenous protest which identified issues of continuing relevance to Indigenous people.

The ambiguous relationship between Indigenous people and the Australian nation remains an issue for Indigenous people. The choice of holding the Day of Mourning on Australia Day, the national holiday celebrating the arrival of the first fleet and the birth of Australia as a nation, highlighted the exclusion of Aboriginal people from the Australian nation. Since the Day of Mourning in 1938, Indigenous people have continued to use Australia Day celebrations to draw attention to their exclusion from the national consciousness as shown by the 1988 bicentenary protest, one of the largest Indigenous protests in Australia. The Australian Hall, as the site of the Day of Mourning, is outstanding in the course of Australia's cultural history for its association with the first national Indigenous protest seeking the inclusion of Indigenous people in the Australian nation.

Criterion G: Social value

The Day of Mourning played a significant role in the history of Indigenous peoples' struggle for the recognition of their civic rights and is regarded by Indigenous people as one of the most important moments in the history of the Indigenous resistance in the early 20th century. The strong social and cultural association Indigenous people have with Australia Hall and the Day of Mourning is demonstrated by the continuous references made by Indigenous leaders from across Australia to this event. It is also shown through the campaign during the 1990s for the recognition of the significance of the building to Indigenous people and the depiction of the Day of Mourning at Reconciliation Place. Indigenous people have a strong association with the Australian Hall, the site of the Day of Mourning, as the first national Indigenous protest which identified social justice issues of continuing relevance to Indigenous people.

Criterion H: Significant people

Over 100 people Aboriginal people attended the Day of Mourning at the Australian Hall. Indigenous people involved in the inception and organisation included prominent Aboriginal leaders of the time such as William Cooper, William Ferguson, Jack Patten, Pearl Gibbs, Margaret Tucker and Doug Nicholls. Their combined work produced a significant collection of policy issues impacting on Indigenous people and proposed recommendations for addressing these issues through government action. The political statements associated with the Day of Mourning are still relevant to Indigenous people today. Australia Hall has a special association with the work of the organisers of the Day of Mourning, which is outstanding for its continued relevance to Indigenous people.

=== New South Wales State Heritage List ===
The Cyprus-Hellene Club holds State social significance for at least three groups of people. Firstly, the building holds social significance for the Aboriginal People for its role in the 1938 "Day of Mourning" meeting. This event was the first protest by Aboriginal people for equal opportunities within Australian Society. It was attended by approximately 100 people of Aboriginal Blood and was the beginning of the contemporary Aboriginal Political Movement. Among those who contributed significantly to the movement generally and particularly to the event in the Australian Hall were Mrs Ardler, J Connelly, William Cooper, William Ferguson, Tom Foster, Pearl Gibbs, Helen Grosvenor, Jack Johnson, Jack Kinchela, Bert Marr, Pastor Doug Nicholls, Henry Noble, Jack Patten, Tom Pecham, Frank Roberts and Margaret Tucker. Secondly, it holds significance for the German and Greek-Cypriot communities in Sydney as it allowed visitors and migrants to enjoy cultural and social events. The building also has an association with Australian national and political history in its ownership (1920–79) by the Knights of the Southern Cross, a Catholic fraternal lay group linked with the Catholic Right and, ultimately with the split in the Labor Party in the 1950s.

The building was initially built to be used as a meeting place for cultural and social activities and was continuously used for these events including cinema and theatre. It is a rare example of a purpose built building in Sydney continuously used for its initial purpose.

The building holds architectural significance as it still contains some examples of original architecture. It is a good example of Federation Romanesque style. The interior also contains examples of certain features that could date from the original construction in the 1920s and also has features from each of the renovations since

Cyprus-Hellene Club was listed on the New South Wales State Heritage Register on 2 April 1999 having satisfied the following criteria.

The place is important in demonstrating the course, or pattern, of cultural or natural history in New South Wales.

The Australian Hall is of State significance as the site of the National "Day of Mourning" - the first organised Aboriginal Civil Rights protest. They met in 1938 to debate a ten-point list of demands aimed at changing the then current disadvantages to Aboriginal People. The list was presented to Prime Minister Joseph Lyons four days later and formally began the struggle for indigenous rights. A theatre, art-house cinema and club houses operated from the building until 1999 when it was purchased by the Indigenous Land Trust to house a museum of Aboriginal heroes. The site is important in the Aboriginal and Political history of Australia and is significant for its association with the beginning of the continuing struggle for the rights of Aboriginal people.

The place has a strong or special association with a person, or group of persons, of importance of cultural or natural history of New South Wales's history.

The Cyprus-Hellene Club is of State significance as the site of the 1938 Day of Mourning, which sparked the modern Aboriginal political movement.

The place has a strong or special association with a particular community or cultural group in New South Wales for social, cultural or spiritual reasons.

The Cyprus-Hellenic Club is of State significance for its strong connections with several groups throughout its history. Firstly, the German Concordia Club used the building for cultural and social events allowing their culture to continue outside their homeland and providing German migrants and visitors to Sydney a touch of home. Similarly thus can be said for the Greek-Cypriots who later used the club for its cultural and social events. Secondly, the Aboriginal people of Australia have a strong connection to the building for its use in the first organised Aboriginal Civil Rights protest in 1938. Thirdly, and to a lesser extent, the building has a connection with the Knights of the Southern Cross and even the Asian Community of Sydney. Both these groups found a purpose to use the building. The KSC used the building as a place to find employment for Catholic people and also as a call in centre, while the Asian community of Sydney have links to the cinema for its dedication to showing Asian films. Once again, providing a cultural group with a sense of identity outside their homeland.

The place possesses uncommon, rare or endangered aspects of the cultural or natural history of New South Wales.

The building is a rare example of a European building that is of heritage significance to both Aboriginal and European communities, but particularly to Aboriginal people. It is of State significance as a rare example of a venue for club, social, recreational and entertainment purposes which was in continuous use for that purpose since its erection until recently. It is rare for the use by a number of social institutions related to ethnic groups.
