= When We Are Married (musical) =

- Music: Tommy Tycho
- Lyrics: Alan Kitson
- Book: Alan Kitson & William Orr
- Basis: J. B. Priestley's play When We Are Married
- Productions: 1970 Sydney

When We Are Married is an Australian musical with music by Tommy Tycho, lyrics by Alan Kitson and book by Kitson and William Orr. It is an adaptation of English playwright J. B. Priestley's 1938 play of the same name, set in Sydney in 1908.

The musical opened on 27 August 1970 at the Phillip Theatre in Sydney. The cast featured Johnny Lockwood, Jill Perryman, Barbara Wyndon, Susan Swinford, Leila Blake, Joan Bruce, Johnny Ladd, Henri Szeps and Raymond Duparc.

Lorrae Desmond performed "Get Out Today Start Moving" from the musical on a 1970 recording of songs from Australian musicals, Australian Musicals – Now!
