= Claytons =

Beverage brand

Claytons is the brand name of a non-alcoholic, non-carbonated beverage coloured and packaged to resemble bottled whisky. It was the subject of a major marketing campaign in Australia and New Zealand in the 1970s and 1980s, promoting it as "the drink you have when you're not having a drink" at a time when alcohol was being targeted as a major factor in the road death toll. The jingle was written by Australian social satirist John McKellar.

The product has not been advertised on television since the 1980s, yet the name has entered into Australian and New Zealand vernacular, often referring to an ersatz. For example, a knowledgeable but unqualified handyman could be referred to as a "Claytons carpenter". The term can also be used as an insult. An insurance policy or clause in an insurance policy that must be taken out or complied with despite there being no need for the policy, ability for the policyholder to either comply with the terms of the endorsement or ability to lodge a claim under the policy may be referred to as "Claytons cover" or a "Claytons clause".

== Product history ==
According to the product label, Claytons was "originally blended and bottled by the Clayton Brothers for the Pure Water Company, Battersea, London, in the 1880s. According to 1980s labelling it was "made from African kola nuts and citrus essences". The product, bottled by Beecham, was taken off the market in New Zealand but continued to be distributed in Australia through Orlando Wines and later Cadbury-Schweppes.

As of 2020 the Claytons brand is still being used by Armstrong Agencies Ltd in Barbados, though the product is called Claytons Kola Tonic. As of 2025, this does not have an Australian distributor.

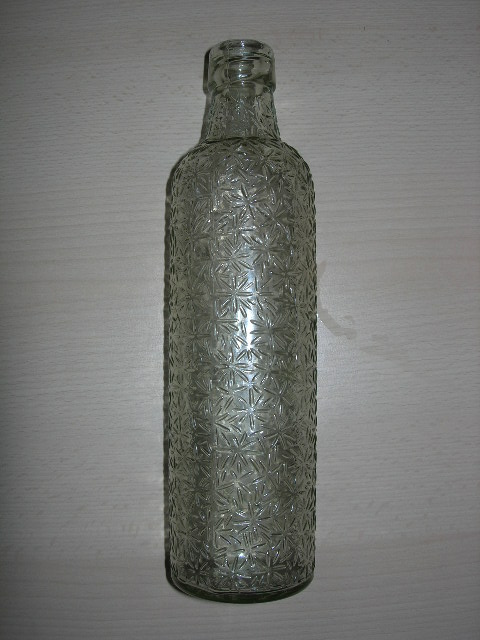
Circa 1947 Bottle

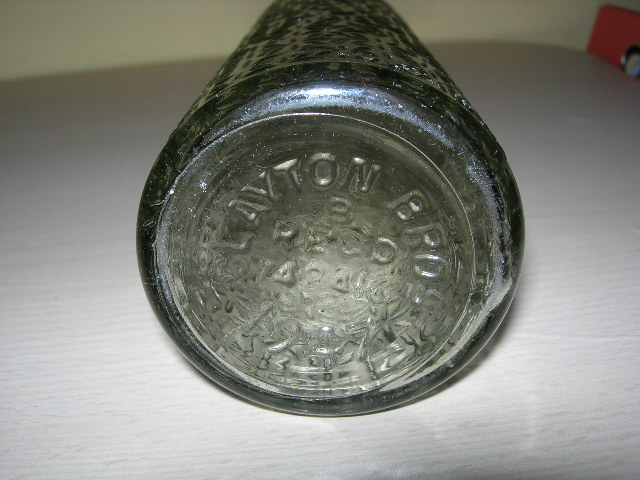
Base of same bottle with the imprint "Clayton Bros"

== In popular culture ==
Though the product is largely forgotten, the phrase "Claytons" has entered the Australian and New Zealand vernacular with two different, but related, meanings:

- Same word, different thing – Many regarded Claytons as a poor taste substitute, and the promotional campaign was ridiculed at the time. Subsequently, the term "Claytons" entered the vocabulary of both countries, used as an adjective to signify a compromise which satisfies no-one, or any form of inferior substitute or low-quality imitation, largely synonymous with the word "ersatz". For example, a hasty or temporary repair may be only a "Claytons solution" to a problem.
- Different word, same thing – Claytons may also refer to something essentially the same but going by a different name. So for instance before an election is officially called there is the "Claytons election campaign": the election campaign you have when you're not having an election campaign.

The term is primarily used by people old enough to remember the original advertising campaign, but it is still widely used throughout both countries, especially in political debate.

The commercial also generated another catch-phrase which became common in New Zealand and Australia. Before turning to camera at the start of the ad, our Claytons-drinking hero (played by Jack Thompson) tells the punch-line of a joke to the barman: "... And then this guy says 'Now we can all get some sleep!'" After completing a particularly irksome task – perhaps changing a tyre in the rain, or dropping 12 children off to their respective houses after a noisy birthday party – one can say "Now we can all get some sleep" to put a humorous full stop on the event.

In the original advertisement, set in a bar, this "punchline" was greeted with uproarious laughter, followed by this dialogue:

- Barman: "What'll you have?"
- Jack: "Claytons, thanks, Brian."
- Bloke in Bar: "On the wagon, Jack?"
- Jack: "No. When I don't feel like alcohol, I have Claytons."
- Voice-over: "Claytons. The drink you have when you're not having a drink."

Claytons is also the name given to the South Island Intervarsity Novice Debating Championships hosted by Canterbury University and Otago University Debating Society. It is referred to as Claytons because it is the "debating tournament you go to when you're not debating."

== See also ==
- New Zealand English
- Australian words
- Ersatz good
