= Askit Powders =

British over the counter medication brand

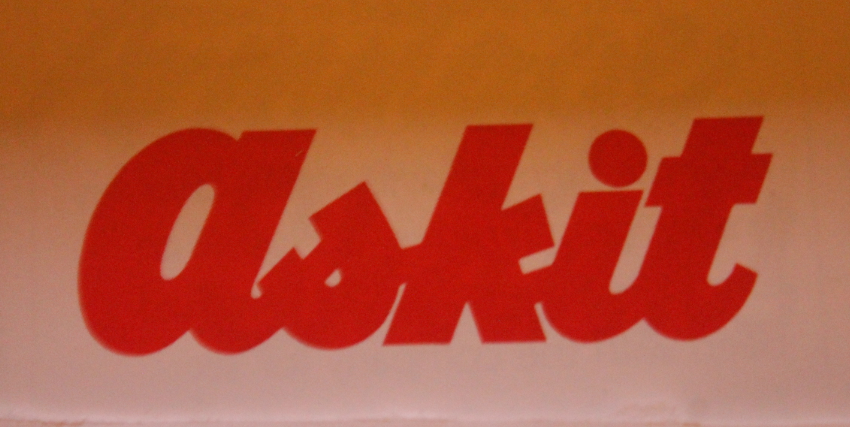
- Industry: Medical
- Founded: 1920; 106 years ago
- Founder: Adam Laidlaw
- Headquarters: Scotland, United Kingdom

Askit Powders was a proprietary brand of headache cure sold primarily in the UK. The product combined aspirin, aloxiprin and caffeine.

== History ==
In the 19th century, it was common for apothecaries to create their own combinations of drugs to combat specific ailments. Some sources credit the Swedish physician Herman Hjorton with creating the product under the name "Hjorton's Powders" in 1903, but it is noted that the main ingredient, phenacetin, had been available since 1887.

In the Cowlairs district of Glasgow one such apothecary, named Adam Laidlaw, had a premises on Keppochhill Road. He devised a mix of aspirin, phenacetin and caffeine to combat colds, headaches and many other problems: a true panacea. By 1900, he was selling an average of 450 to 500 powders per week, and had obtained a fame somewhat wider than the natural catchment area of his pharmacy. In 1917, he asked a local accountant, John McRobbie, for advice on setting up a company to start making the powder in greater quantities. By 1920, this materialised into a mechanised factory, but the product had no name other than "Mr Laidlaw's Powders".

The name is said to derive from two girls coming into the shop around 1920 and saying to the person serving in the apothecary: "if it is the lady chemist I'll ask it: if it is the man chemist you ask it". This name quickly allows the logo "Ask for Askit". Mrs Laidlaw heard the words and related her idea to her husband. It was registered the next day, and added as the name of their purpose-built factory on Saracen Street in the Possilpark district. The original production was 20,000 powders per year.

It became a limited company, Askit Ltd., on 13 April 1925.

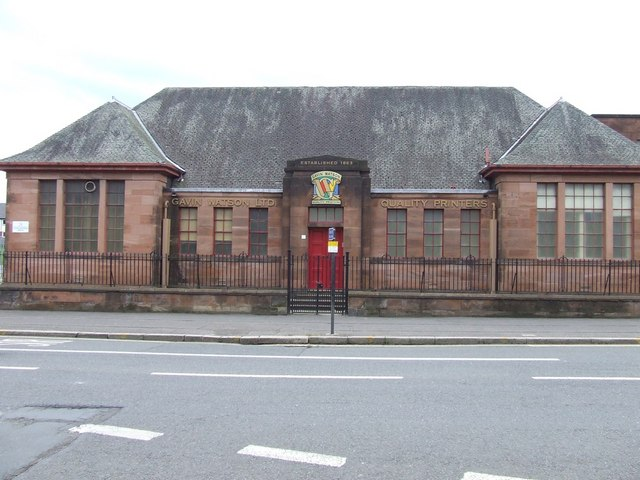
The former Askit factory, Saracen Street, Glasgow

An expansion of the factory in the 1930s was opened by Lord Provost Alexander Swan. It employed around 40 people. In 1940 they started a campaign to begin sales abroad, beginning with ex-Scots living in Canada. By 1945 production stood at 20 million per year. By the 1960s the powders were available across most of the British Commonwealth. Marketing also included making the powders available from ice cream vans from the 1960s onwards.

In 1966, phenacetin was substituted with aloxiprin due to several cases linking it to kidney failure. It was also acknowledged that the product was somewhat addictive, echoed in their logo "Askit fights the miseries". Heavily addicted individuals in the pre-66 formula risked kidney failure.

In 1971, they began a simple and effective TV advertising campaign: Askit Fights the Miseries, featuring characters such as the sore back, and morning after. These cartoons were drawn by Roger Hargreaves who later gained fame in the creation of the Mr Men. This advertising campaign was one of the longest-running and most successful in British advertising history: running the same format until 1994. In 1997, a new campaign began featuring a man with a bulbous nose simply known as the "Wee Man" (a very Glaswegian character).

The factory left Saracen Street and moved to Cumbernauld. The old premises is occupied by a printing firm, Gavin Watson. In 2005, the product name was bought by Bayer PLC from the then owner Roche, and it ceased production in 2012.
