= Renal papillary necrosis =

- Other names: Renal medullary necrosis
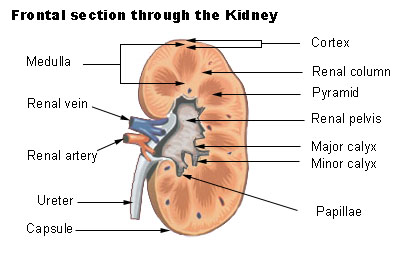
- Frontal section through the kidney
- Specialty: Urology, nephrology
- Symptoms: Back pain, cloudy urine
- Causes: Diabetic nephropathy, Kidney infection
- Diagnostic method: Blood and urine test
- Treatment: Depends on cause

Renal papillary necrosis is a form of nephropathy involving the necrosis of the renal papilla. Lesions that characterize renal papillary necrosis come from an impairment of the blood supply and from subsequent ischemic necrosis that is diffuse.

== Signs and symptoms ==
Symptoms (and signs) consistent with renal papillary necrosis are:

- Back pain
- Cloudy urine
- Tissue pieces (in urine)
- Fever
- Painful/frequent urination
- Urinary incontinence
- Hematuria
However, patients may not specifically present any of the aforementioned signs and may instead present an array of abnormal urinary complications such as urinary retention and macroscopic hematuria, in which case it is important to consider this disease as a diagnosis of exclusion.

== Causes ==
In terms of cause, almost any condition that involves ischemia can lead to renal papillary necrosis. A mnemonic for the causes of renal papillary necrosis is POSTCARDS: pyelonephritis, obstruction of the urogenital tract, sickle cell disease, tuberculosis, cirrhosis of the liver, analgesia/alcohol use disorder, renal vein thrombosis, diabetes mellitus, and systemic vasculitis. Often, a patient with renal papillary necrosis will have numerous conditions acting synergistically to bring about the disease.

Analgesic nephropathy is a common cause of renal papillary necrosis. The risk is higher for phenacetin (which was withdrawn from market in the United States) and paracetamol (acetaminophen) compared to aspirin and other NSAIDs.

== Pathophysiology ==
This condition is due to ischemia of the renal papillae, the portion of the kidney that collects urine from the nephron. The papillae are vulnerable to ischemia as they are supplied by small caliber arteries which are liable to obstruction. All of the underlying causes of papillary necrosis cause diminished flow through these arteries, either through direct mechanical obstruction (sickle cell), obstruction secondary to inflammation (vasculitides), or vasoconstriction (NSAIDs). Papillary necrosis is more likely to develop when multiple of these underlying factors are present. Ultimately, necrosis of the papillae results in sloughing into the lumen, causing hematuria. If the degree of necrosis is substantial post-renal failure may occur, though this is uncommon.

== Diagnosis ==
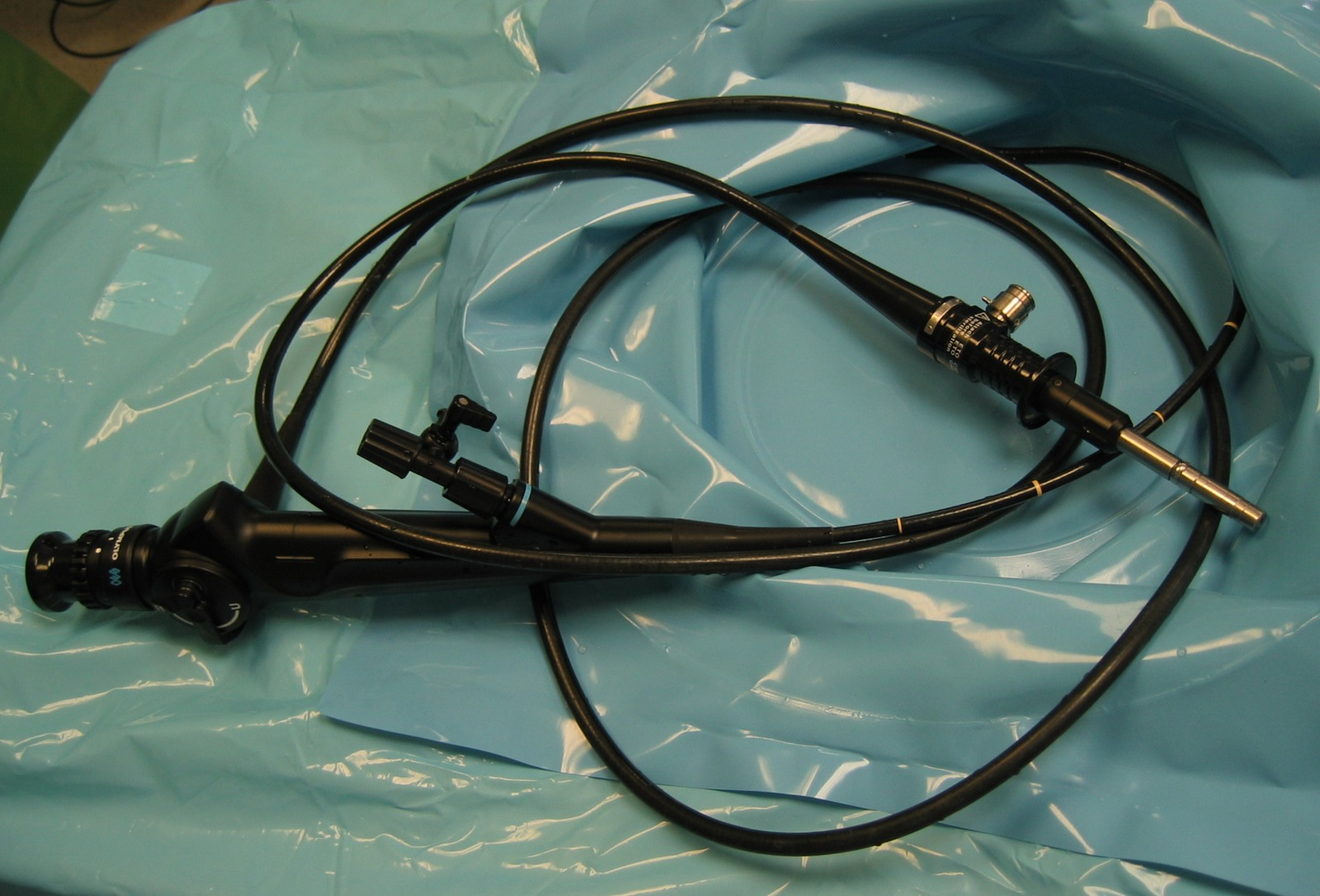
Cystoscope

Individuals with renal papillary necrosis due to excess use of analgesic have an elevated risk of epithelial tumors, hence a urine cytology exam is useful. In terms of imaging this condition can be identified by retrograde pyelography (RGP). Further, radiological imaging, particularly CT scanning, can provide an effective method for early diagnosis, ultimately allowing for more timely intervention and more successful treatment outcomes. The diagnosis of renal papillary necrosis is therefore done via:

- Urinalysis
- Blood cell count
- Urine cytology study
- Imaging study (with intravenous contrast)
- Cystoscopy
- Ureteroscopy

== Treatment ==
Progressive renal papillary necrosis may result in irreversible tissue damage, obstruction, and a decline in renal function, and in severe cases when both kidneys are affected, it can lead to kidney failure. Treatment of renal papillary necrosis is supportive, any obstruction (ureteral) can be dealt with via stenting. Control of infection is important, thus antimicrobial treatment is begun, so as to avert surgery (should the infection not respond).
