= Aloxiprin =

Chemical compound

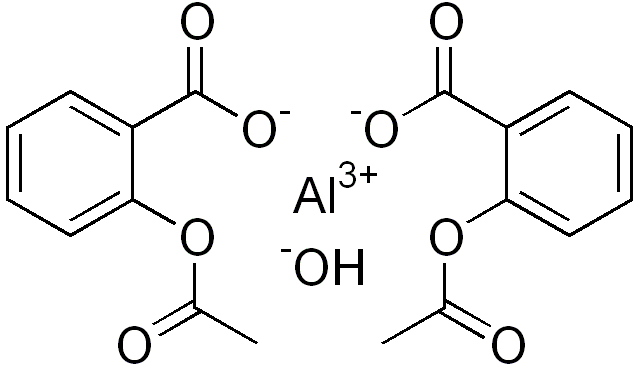

Clinical data
- AHFS/Drugs.com: International Drug Names
- ATC code: B01AC15 (WHO) N02BA02 (WHO)

Legal status
- Legal status: AU: S2 (Pharmacy medicine)

Identifiers
- IUPAC name: aluminium 2-acetyloxybenzoate hydroxide
- CAS Number: 9014-67-9
- PubChem CID: 71586929
- ChemSpider: 32698107
- UNII: 6QT214X4XU
- KEGG: D07421
- CompTox Dashboard (EPA): DTXSID60238044

Chemical and physical data
- Formula: C_{9}H_{8}Al_{2}O_{7}
- Molar mass: 282.119 g·mol^{−1}
- 3D model (JSmol): Interactive image; Interactive image
- SMILES: CC(=O)OC1=CC=CC=C1C(=O)O.[O-2].[O-2].[O-2].[Al+3].[Al+3]; CC(=O)Oc0ccccc0C(=O)O[Al](O)OC(=O)c1ccccc1OC(=O)C
- InChI: InChI=1S/C9H8O4.2Al.3O/c1-6(10)13-8-5-3-2-4-7(8)9(11)12;;;;;/h2-5H,1H3,(H,11,12);;;;;/q;2*+3;3*-2; Key:MXCPYJZDGPQDRA-UHFFFAOYSA-N

Aloxiprin (or aluminium acetylsalicylate) is a medication used for the treatment of pain and inflammation associated with muscular skeletal and joint disorders. It is used for its properties as an anti-inflammatory, antipyretic and analgesic drug. It is a chemical compound of aluminium hydroxide and aspirin.

== Alternative names and combinations ==
- Palaprin Forte
- Askit Powders - A powder combination of aspirin, aloxiprin and caffeine.

== Contraindications ==
- People with allergies to salicylates.
- People with gastrointestinal ulcers.
- People with liver or kidney damage.
- Pregnant women in the third trimester.
- Women who are breastfeeding.
- Use with other salicylates.
- Use with Nonsteroidal anti-inflammatory drugs (NSAIDs).
