= Analgesic nephropathy =

- Classically caused by mixed analgesics containing phenacetin, analgesic nephropathy was once a common cause of acute kidney injury.
- Specialty: Nephrology

Analgesic nephropathy is injury to the kidneys caused by analgesic medications such as aspirin, bucetin, phenacetin, and paracetamol. The term usually refers to damage induced by excessive use of combinations of these medications, especially combinations that include phenacetin. It may also be used to describe kidney injury from any single analgesic medication.

The specific kidney injuries induced by analgesics are renal papillary necrosis and chronic interstitial nephritis. They appear to result from decreased blood flow to the kidney, rapid consumption of antioxidants, and subsequent oxidative damage to the kidney. This kidney damage may lead to progressive chronic kidney failure, abnormal urinalysis results, high blood pressure, and anemia. A small proportion of individuals with analgesic nephropathy may develop end-stage kidney disease.

Analgesic nephropathy was once a common cause of kidney injury and end-stage kidney disease in parts of Europe, Australia, and the United States. In most areas, its incidence has declined sharply since the use of phenacetin fell in the 1970s and 1980s.

== Presentation ==
Clinical findings in analgesic nephropathy
Finding	Proportion affected
Headache	35-100%
Pyuria	50-100%
Anemia	60-90%
Hypertension	15-70%
Gastrointestinal symptoms	40-60%
Urinary tract infection	30-60%

Common findings in people with analgesic nephropathy include headache, anemia, high blood pressure (hypertension), and white blood cells in the urine (leucocyturia, pyuria). Some individuals with analgesic nephropathy may also have protein in their urine (proteinuria).

=== Complications ===
Complications of analgesic nephropathy include pyelonephritis and end-stage kidney disease. Risk factors for poor prognosis include recurrent urinary tract infection and persistently elevated blood pressure. Analgesic nephropathy also appears to increase the risk of developing cancers of the urinary system.

== Pathophysiology ==
The scarring of the small blood vessels, called capillary sclerosis, is the initial lesion of analgesic nephropathy. Found in the renal pelvis, ureter, and capillaries supplying the nephrons, capillary sclerosis is thought to lead to renal papillary necrosis and, in turn, chronic interstitial nephritis.

How phenacetin and other analgesics lead to this damage is incompletely understood. It is currently thought that the kidney toxicities of NSAIDs and the antipyretics phenacetin and paracetamol may combine to give rise to analgesic nephropathy. A committee of investigators reported in 2000 that there was insufficient evidence to suggest that non-phenacetin analgesics by themselves are associated with analgesic nephropathy.

=== Aspirin and NSAIDs ===
Proper kidney function depends upon adequate blood flow to the kidney. Kidney blood flow is a complex, tightly regulated process that relies on a number of hormones and other small molecules, such as prostaglandins. Under normal circumstances, prostaglandin E2 (PGE_{2}) produced by the kidney is necessary to support adequate blood flow to the kidney. Like all prostaglandins, PGE_{2} synthesis depends upon the cyclooxygenases.

Aspirin and other NSAIDs are inhibitors of the cyclooxygenases. In the kidney, this inhibition results in decreased PGE_{2} concentration causing a reduction in blood flow. Because blood flow to the kidney first reaches the renal cortex (outside) and then the renal medulla (inside), the deeper structures of the kidney are most sensitive to decreased blood flow. Thus the innermost structures of the kidney, known as the renal papillae, are especially dependent on prostaglandin synthesis to maintain adequate blood flow. Inhibition of cyclooxygenases therefore rather selectively damages the renal papillae, increasing the risk of renal papillary necrosis.

NSAIDs caused no adverse effects on renal function in healthy dogs subjected to anesthesia. Most healthy kidneys contain enough physiologic reserve to compensate for this NSAID-induced decrease in blood flow. However, those subjected to additional injury from phenacetin or paracetamol may progress to analgesic nephropathy.

=== Phenacetin and paracetamol ===
It is unclear how phenacetin induces injury to the kidney. Bach and Hardy have proposed that phenacetin's metabolites lead to lipid peroxidation that damages cells of the kidney.

Paracetamol is the major metabolite of phenacetin and may contribute to kidney injury through a specific mechanism. In cells of the kidney, cyclooxygenases catalyse the conversion of paracetamol into N-acetyl-p-benzoquinoneimine (NAPQI). NAPQI depletes glutathione via non-enzymatic conjugation with glutathione, a naturally occurring antioxidant. With depletion of glutathione, cells of the kidney become particularly sensitive to oxidative damage.

== Diagnosis ==
Diagnosis is traditionally based on the clinical findings above in combination with excessive analgesic use. Once suspected, analgesic nephropathy can be confirmed with relative accuracy using computed tomography (CT) imaging without contrast. One trial demonstrated that the appearance of papillary calcifications on CT imaging was 92% sensitive and 100% specific for the diagnosis of analgesic nephropathy.

== Treatment ==
Treatment of analgesic nephropathy begins with the discontinuation of analgesics, which often halts the progression of the disease and may even result in normalization of kidney function. In Stage 5 chronic kidney disease patients renal replacement therapy may become necessary.

== History ==
Analgesics are a class of medications widely used in the treatment of pain. They include aspirin and other non-steroidal anti-inflammatory drugs (NSAIDs), as well as the antipyretics paracetamol (known as acetaminophen in the United States) and phenacetin. Introduced in the late 19th century, phenacetin was once a common component of mixed analgesics in parts of Europe, Australia, and the United States. These analgesics contained aspirin or other NSAIDs combined with phenacetin, paracetamol, or salicylamide, and caffeine or codeine.

In the 1950s, Spühler and Zollinger reported an association between kidney injury and the chronic use of phenacetin. They noted that chronic users of phenacetin had an increased risk of developing specific kidney injuries, namely renal papillary necrosis and chronic interstitial nephritis. This condition was dubbed analgesic nephropathy and was attributed to phenacetin, although no absolute causative role was demonstrated. With further reports of the increased risk of kidney injury with prolonged and excessive phenacetin use, however, phenacetin was banned in several countries between the 1960s and 1980s.

As the use of phenacetin declined, so too did the prevalence of analgesic nephropathy as a cause of end-stage kidney disease. Data from Switzerland, for example, demonstrated a decline in the prevalence of analgesic nephropathy among people with end-stage kidney disease, from 28% in 1981 to 12% in 1990. An autopsy study performed in Switzerland suggested that the prevalence of analgesic nephropathy in the general population has likewise decreased; the prevalence was 3% in 1980 and 0.2% in 2000.

While these data demonstrate that analgesic nephropathy has been all but eliminated in some regions, in other regions the condition persists. Notably, in Belgium, the prevalence of analgesic nephropathy among people having dialysis was 17.9% in 1984 and 15.6% in 1990. Michielsen and de Schepper suggest that analgesic nephropathy persists among people in Belgium having dialysis not due to non-phenacetin analgesics, but because Belgium accepts a higher proportion of elderly people for dialysis. According to these authors, a greater proportion have analgesic nephropathy because a greater percentage of people in Belgium having dialysis have been exposed to long-term use of phenacetin.

== Terminology ==
The term analgesic nephropathy usually refers to damage induced by excessive use of combinations of these medications, specifically combinations that include phenacetin. For this reason, it is also called analgesic abuse nephropathy. Murray prefers the less judgmental analgesic-associated nephropathy. Both terms are abbreviated to the acronym AAN, by which the condition is also commonly known.
