= Bucetin =

Chemical compound

Clinical data
- ATC code: N02BE04 (WHO)

Identifiers
- IUPAC name: N-(4-Ethoxyphenyl)-3-hydroxybutanamide
- CAS Number: 1083-57-4
- PubChem CID: 14130
- ChemSpider: 13507
- UNII: 6M7CVQ8PF8
- ChEMBL: ChEMBL1697856
- CompTox Dashboard (EPA): DTXSID6020721
- ECHA InfoCard: 100.012.827

Chemical and physical data
- Formula: C_{12}H_{17}NO_{3}
- Molar mass: 223.272 g·mol^{−1}
- 3D model (JSmol): Interactive image
- SMILES: O=C(Nc1ccc(OCC)cc1)CC(O)C
- InChI: InChI=1S/C12H17NO3/c1-3-16-11-6-4-10(5-7-11)13-12(15)8-9(2)14/h4-7,9,14H,3,8H2,1-2H3,(H,13,15); Key:LIAWQASKBFCRNR-UHFFFAOYSA-N

Bucetin (INN, BAN) is an analgesic and antipyretic that is no longer marketed. Chemically, it is similar to phenacetin with which it shares the risk of carcinogenesis. Bucetin was withdrawn from use in 1986 due to renal toxicity.

== See also ==
- Analgesic nephropathy
- List of withdrawn drugs
