= Phillip Street Theatre =

Australian theatre and theatrical company

The Phillip Street Theatre (succeeded by the Phillip Theatre) was a popular and influential Australian theatre and theatrical company, located in Phillip Street in Sydney that was active from 1954 and 1971 that became well known for its intimate satirical revue productions.

== History ==
=== Founding ===
William Orr was a Scottish-born impresario from Glasgow who had a background as a director and theatre administrator in London before coming to Australia. Orr felt that there was a market in Australia for the new British theatre craze, the intimate topical satirical revue, and he pioneered the format in Sydney during 1954.

Actor Gordon Chater praised Orr as a champion of Australian theatrical talent:

"To this day I think Bill Orr should have been honoured by this country for creating the first post-war entirely professional theatre employing all Australians – the dancers, musicians, actors, lyricists and composers were all Australian."

== Performers ==
Between 1954 and 1971, Orr promoted a series at the Phillip Street Theatre that became known as the 'Phillip Street Revues' which featured many famous Australian performers.

=== List of performers ===
Actor
Ray Barrett
Robina Beard (sister of Chris Bearde)
Wendy Blacklock
Noeline Brown
Gordon Chater
Ruth Cracknell
Barry Creyton
Gloria Dawn
Alastair Duncan
Judi Farr
Barry Humphries
Dawn Lake
Margo Lee
Bobby Limb
Reg Livermore
John Meillon
Kevin Miles
Patricia Pearson
Jill Perryman
June Salter
Bud Tingwell

== Productions ==
In 1953 Orr premiered a small revue, Metropolitan Merry-Go-Round at the Metropolitan Church Hall in Reiby Place, Sydney. This production marked the first professional credit for writer John McKellar, Jerry Donovan and Lance Mulcahy, the three writer-performers had met at school and developed their writing skills in university revues. The trio worked together on several subsequent Phillip St productions and McKellar became the driving force behind most of the Phillip St revues of the '50s and '60s

Also at this time, British-born actor Gordon Chater was appearing in the Sydney production of Hugh Hastings' play Seagulls Over Sorrento. Chater's character did not appear in that play until the end of Act II, and because it was being sent up in the Metropolitan revue, Orr managed to convince Chater to come over to the Metropolitan to introduce the sketch, which was in the first half of the revue, giving Chater enough time to make it back for his performance in Sorrento.

Orr's next revue at the Metropolitan, Maid in Egypt was again written by McKellar, Donovan and Mulcahy, and starred Leonard Teale and Patty Martin.

=== Phillip Street Theatre ===
Year	Title	Location	Actors
1953	Metropolitan Merry-Go-Round	Metropolitan Theatre	Alastair Duncan, David Nettheim
1953	Seagulls Over Sorrento	Metropolitan Theatre	Gordon Chater
1953	Maid in Egypt	Metropolitan Theatre	Leonard Teale & Patty Martin
1954, 1955	Hit and Run	Workers' Education Hall	Ray Barrett, Lola Brooks, Gordon Chater, John Ewart, June Salter, Bud Tingwell, Bettina Welch
1954, 1955	Top of the Bill	Workers' Education Hall	Bud Tingwell, Margo Lee, Gordon Chater
1955	Hat Trick	Workers' Education Hall	Aileen Britton, Max Oldaker, June Salter
1955	Hamlet	Workers' Education Hall	Allan Trevor, John Meillon, Owen Weingott
1955	The Duenna	Workers' Education Hall	Gordon Chater, Ruth Cracknell, Geoffrey Chard, Shirley Summers
1955, 1956, 1957	Happy Returns	Workers' Education Hall	Ray Barrett, Gordon Chater, Norman Coburn, Margo Lee, Terry McDermott, John Meillon, Madge Ryan, June Salter
1955, 1956	Two to One	Workers' Education Hall	Max Oldaker, Wendy Blacklock, Barry Humphries
	Olympic Hostess	Workers' Education Hall	Barry Humphries
1956, 1957	Around the Loop	Workers' Education Hall	Max Oldaker, Gordon Chater, Wendy Blacklock, Barry Humphries, June Salter
1956	Mr. and Mrs	Workers' Education Hall	Barry Humphries
1956, 1958, 1959	Alice in Wonderland	Workers' Education Hall	Robina Beard, John Bluthal, Peter Kenna, Max Meldrum
1957	Gordon Chater	Workers' Education Hall	Gordon Chater, Reg Livermore
1957	The Willow Pattern Plate	Workers' Education Hall	John Bluthal, Ben Gabriel, Reg Livermore, Leon Thau, Owen Weingott
1957, 1958	Cross Section	Workers' Education Hall	Reg Livermore, John Meillon, Ruth Cracknell, June Salter
1958, 1959	Bats	Workers' Education Hall	John Bluthal, Ronald Frazer,
1959	The Birthday Show	Workers' Education Hall	John Bluthal, Ronald Frazer, Jill Perryman
1959	Meet Joyce Grenfell	Workers' Education Hall	Joyce Grenfell
1959	Hey Diddle Diddle	Workers' Education Hall	Robina Beard, Gordon Chater, Judi Farr
1959	A Ride on a Broomstick	Workers' Education Hall	Robina Beard, Gordon Chater
1960	Phillip Street Revue	Workers' Education Hall	Wendy Blacklock, Ronald Frazer, Peter Kenna
1960	Mistress Money	Workers' Education Hall	Robina Beard, Wendy Blacklock, Gordon Chater, Judi Farr

=== Phillip Theatre ===
Year	Title	Location	Actors
1961	Out on a Limb	Australian Hall	Bettina Welch, Bobby Limb, Dawn Lake
1961	Stop Press	Australian Hall	
1961	Yes Please!		
1961-62	Alice in Wonderland		
1962	What's New?		
1962	Beyond the Fringe		
1962	A Wish is a Dream		
1962	At It Again	Australian Hall	
1963	Flaming Youth	Australian Hall	
1063	Do You Mind!		
1963	The Private Ear		Gordon Chater, John Bell, Max Osbiston
1963	The Public Eye		Gordon Chater, John Bell, Max Osbiston
1964	The Importance of Being Oscar	Australian Hall	Micheál Mac Liammóir
1964	I Must Be Talking to My Friends		Micheál Mac Liammóir
1964	Rattle of a Simple Man		John Meillon, June Salter
1964	Breakfast with Julia		
1964	Is Australia Really Necessary?		
1964	Santa's Christmas Party		
1964	Beyond the Fringe	Australian Hall	Alastair Duncan, John Ewart
1965	The Knack		Reg Livermore, Tom Oliver, Peter Whitford
1965	A Severed Head		
1965	The Tintookies		
1965-66	A Cup Of Tea, A Bex and A Good Lie Down	Australian Hall	
1966	The Fantasticks		Ron Shand, Willie Fennell, Frank Lloyd
1966	Private Yuk Objects		
1966	Luv		Alastair Duncan
1966	Alice in Wonderland		
1967	The Sound of Morley		
1967	Hail Gloria Fitzpatrick		
1967	There Will Be an Interval of 15 Minutes		
1967	All By Myself (Anna Russell)		
1967	But I Wouldn't Want to Live There		
1968	Relatively Speaking		
1968	The Boy Friend		
1969	Your Own Thing		
1969	Lie Back and Enjoy It		
1969	Candy Stripe Balloon		
1969	Not Now, Darling		
1970	The Bandwagon		
1970	Emlyn Williams as Charles Dickens		
1970	When We Are Married		
1970	Alice in Wonderland		
1971	The Legend of King O'Malley		
1971	Come Live With Me		
1971	Who Killed Santa Claus?		

=== Second encore ===
Year	Title	Location	Actors
1980	Hal: Aspects of Henry IV Pt.1	Workers' Education Hall	
1980	Puss in Boots	Workers' Education Hall	
1980	Under Milk Wood	Workers' Education Hall	
1980	Little Red Riding Hood	Workers' Education Hall	
1980	Festival of Sydney Playwrights		
1980	Glad Bags	Workers' Education Hall	
1981	When in Rome		
1981	Hammer		
1981	Five Minutes, Mr Klein		
1981	The Centenarian		
1981	You're a Good Man, Charlie Brown		
1981	Two for a Theatre	Workers' Education Hall	
1981	Smoking is a Health Hazard	Workers' Education Hall	Max Gillies
1981	Scanlan	Workers' Education Hall	Max Gillies
1981	Dick Whittington and His Cat	Workers' Education Hall	
1981	The Stripper's Progress	Workers' Education Hall	
1981	Blood of the Lamb	Workers' Education Hall	
1981	Flexitime	Workers' Education Hall	
1981, 1984	Goldilocks and the Three Bears	Workers' Education Hall	
1982	Indian Summer	Workers' Education Hall	
1982	Conundra	Workers' Education Hall	
1982	I've Come about the Suicide	Workers' Education Hall	
1982	The Right Man	Workers' Education Hall	
1982	The Anniversary	Workers' Education Hall	
1982	Sleeping Beauty	Workers' Education Hall	
1982	God's Favorite	Workers' Education Hall	
1982, 1984	Jack and the Beanstalk	Workers' Education Hall	
1982	Cowardy Custard	Workers' Education Hall	
1982	Cinderella	Workers' Education Hall	
1983	Children of a Lesser God	Workers' Education Hall	
1983	The First Night of Pygmalion	Workers' Education Hall	
1983	Mother Goose	Workers' Education Hall	
1983	Macbeth	Workers' Education Hall	
1983	Babes in Toyland	Workers' Education Hall	
1983	Sister Mary Ignatius Explains It All for You	Workers' Education Hall	
1983	The Actor's Nightmare	Workers' Education Hall	
1983, 1986	Aladdin and His Magic Lamp	Workers' Education Hall	
1984, 1985	The Removalists	Workers' Education Hall	
1984	Us or Them	Workers' Education Hall	
1984. 1987	Little Red Riding Hood	Workers' Education Hall	
1984	The Cake Man	Workers' Education Hall	
1984, 1985, 1988	The Shifting Heart	Workers' Education Hall	
1984, 1985, 1987	The Diary of Anne Frank	Workers' Education Hall	
1985	An Evening with Queen Victoria	Workers' Education Hall	
1985, 1987	The Glass Menagerie	Workers' Education Hall	
1985, 1986, 1987	The Club	Workers' Education Hall	Mark Butler, Tom Considine, Kevin Healy, Peter Phelps, Kit Taylor
1986, 1987	Hamlet	Workers' Education Hall	
1986, 1988	Pygmalion	Workers' Education Hall	
1986	Three Little Pigs	Workers' Education Hall	
1987-88	Whose Life is it Anyway?	Workers' Education Hall	
1987	The Old Woman Who Lived in a Shoe	Workers' Education Hall	
1988, 1989	Educating Rita	Workers' Education Hall	Terence Donovan, Amanda Muggleton
1988	Puss in Boots	Workers' Education Hall	
1988	Cinderella	Workers' Education Hall	

== Creation of the Phillip Street Theatre ==
In 1954 Orr and his partner Eric Duckworth were given the use of the Workers' Education Hall in Phillip Street, Sydney, as a theatre, and they renamed it the Phillip Street Theatre. It was here that Orr staged his next revue, Top of the Bill (1954), written by McKellar, Donovan and Mulcahy and featuring Bud Tingwell, Margo Lee and an (unknown) American actor, with Chater making a guest appearance in each half of the show. During rehearsals the American actor repeatedly turned up drunk, so he was sacked a week before the premiere and Chater was asked to step into the role. The revue included a sketches about the Petrov Affair, with Chater and Tingwell as David Jones floorwalkers and Chater in a solo turn as Australian dress designer "Pierre of Balmain" (a play on words that conflated the French fashion house Pierre Balmain and the Sydney suburb of Balmain, which was at that time a run-down working-class enclave). Orr planned to stage three shows a week, but the new revue proved a great success—within days they were playing six shows a week plus Friday and Saturday matinees, and in his memoir Chater recounted that "there were queues around the corner of Phillip Street down to Castlereagh, and the production ran for two months."

Orr established a board of directors for the Phillip Street Theatre that included author Morris West, journalist Betty Best, charity fundraiser Nola Dekyvere and (later) lawyer John Kerr. Despite the success of Top of the Bill and its follow-up Hat Trick (1955) the board decided that the next show would be a straight production of Hamlet, which flopped. This was followed by a production of Sheridan's comedy The Duenna, set to music by Julian Slade and directed by British director Lionel Harris, who had been brought to Australia to direct a local production that featured visiting British actors Lewis Casson, Sybil Thorndike, Ralph Richardson and (his wife) Meriel Forbes. Harris asked Chater to play the role of Mendoza and also cast the young Ruth Cracknell. The production was well-received but it was terminated in the middle of its run by the hall's owners, the Workers' Educational Association (WEA), who took legal action against the theatre company to regain use of the hall.

Orr's next production was another satirical revue, Two to One (1955), starring veteran Australian musical star Max Oldaker, with Wendy Blacklock and a rising young actor-comedian from Melbourne, Barry Humphries. A couple of years earlier, while touring country Victoria with a theatre company headed by playwright Ray Lawler, Humphries had amused his fellow actors with a parody of a middle-class Australian housewife; for the company's end-of-year revue he named her Edna Everage and played her in a sketch he wrote for the show, called "Olympic Hostess". Although he had originally assumed that his 'turn' as Edna was a one-off, he decided to revive "Olympic Hostess" for the Phillip Street revue and its success helped to launch what became a fifty-year career for the self-proclaimed "Housewife Megastar".

Orr's next successful revue was Around the Loop (1956) which again teamed Oldaker, Chater, Blacklock and Humphries, plus newcomer June Salter. Humphries revived the Edna character (for what he said would be the last time) and the revue proved to be a major hit, playing eight shows a week for 14 months. During this period Humphries was living near Bondi and while out walking one day he had a chance meeting with an elderly man who had a high, scratchy voice and a pedantic manner of speech; this encounter inspired the creation of another of Humphries' best-known and most enduring characters, pensioner Sandy Stone.

== Move to the Phillip Theatre ==
When the Phillip Street hall was demolished in 1961 (at the time of the Bobby Limb and Dawn Lake production Out on a Limb) Orr moved his company to the Australian Hall at 150 Elizabeth St, renaming it the Phillip Theatre. There he presented a string of successful revue productions, the best known of which was John McKellar's A Cup Of Tea, A Bex and A Good Lie Down (1965), the title of which immediately passed into the Australian vernacular. Other known productions included a local version of the landmark British satirical sketch show Beyond the Fringe (1962), Stop Press (1961) The Importance of Being Oscar (1964), Flaming Youth (1963) and At It Again.

== The Mavis Bramston show ==
The topical satire featured in the Phillip St revues exerted a considerable influence on Australia's first satirical television comedy series, The Mavis Bramston Show (1964–68), and the Bramston show featured numerous cast and crew who had worked in these live revues, including Gordon Chater, Barry Creyton, June Salter, Wendy Blacklock, writer John McKellar and writer-producer James Fishburn.

== Conversion to cinema venue ==
The Phillip Street revues ended in 1971 when the Phillip Theatre changed hands and became the Richbrooke then the Rivoli (when leased briefly by Hoyts), then the Mandarin Cinema, Mandolin and finally Dave's Encore. The building has now returned to its original form of the Australian Hall.

== Second encore ==
Note that the Phillip Street Theatre, separately to Orr's Phillip Theatre, recommenced operations in 1963 following the completion of a 300-seat theatre within the office block which replaced the 1961 demolition. This new Phillip Street Theatre continued until 1989 with children's drama classes and productions such as Peter and Ellen Williams' 1988 production of their pantomime Cinderella, with Derek Williams as musical director.
