= 2,2,4-Trimethyl-1,2-dihydroquinoline =

- Monomer

Names
- Preferred IUPAC name 2,2,4-Trimethyl-1,2-dihydroquinoline
- Other names 1,2-Dihydro-2,2,4-trimethylquinoline; TMQ Antioxidant

Identifiers
CAS Number	26780-96-1
3D model (JSmol)	Interactive image
ChEMBL	ChEMBL294154
ChemSpider	8633
ECHA InfoCard	100.005.172
EC Number	500-051-3
PubChem CID	8981
UNII	0553M374Q3
CompTox Dashboard (EPA)	DTXSID0025070
- InChI: InChI=1S/C12H15N/c1-9-8-12(2,3)13-11-7-5-4-6-10(9)11/h4-8,13H,1-3H3 Key: ZNRLMGFXSPUZNR-UHFFFAOYSA-N
- SMILES: CC=1C=2C(NC(C)(C)C1)=CC=CC2

Properties
Chemical formula	C_{12}H_{15}N
Molar mass	173.259 g·mol^{−1}
Appearance	Solid
Density	1.042 at 20°C
Melting point	48 °C (118 °F; 321 K)
Solubility in water	1 mg/L

Hazards
- GHS labelling
Pictograms	(GHS07: Exclamation mark) (GHS09: Environmental hazard)
Signal word	Warning
Hazard statements	H412
Precautionary statements	P273
- Except where otherwise noted, data are given for materials in their standard state (at 25 °C [77 °F], 100 kPa). Infobox references

2,2,4-Trimethyl-1,2-dihydroquinoline (usually abbreviated TMQ, known historically as Acetone-anil) is an aminic antioxidant commonly used as a stabiliser in rubbers and some plastics.

== Synthesis ==
TMQ is produced by a poly-condensation reaction between aniline and acetone.

== Structure ==
The most common of several possible TMQ dimers. CAS 18121-94-3

The structure of TMQ is often represented by the monomer; however, the commercial material is typically a complex mixture of oligomers. Dimers, trimers, and tetramers are common, but high molecular weight versions are also available. ECHA includes nearly a dozen compounds in the registration for TMQ. Differences in composition between suppliers can affect performance, resulting a complex market.

== Applications ==
TMQ is primarily used in rubber. It is a good antioxidant, but it gives low protection against flex cracking (fatigue) and is not effective as an antiozonant. In tire formulations it is often paired with 6PPD. The high molecular weight of TMQ oligomers makes them non-volatile and therefore more effective as long term heat-protection agents. It also makes them less likely to leach out of the polymer. TMQ is relatively inert towards the cross-linking peroxides used to produce EPDM, or PEX and it therefore also sees use in these polymers.

== See also ==
- Ethoxyquin - a structurally related antioxidant used as a preservative in foods
