= Compound analgesic =

Analgesics with multiple ingredients

Compound analgesics are those with multiple active ingredients; they include many of the stronger prescription analgesics.

Active ingredients that have been commonly used in compound analgesics include:

- aspirin or ibuprofen
- caffeine
- codeine or oxycodone
- paracetamol (acetaminophen)
- phenacetin

There is evidence that a compound of two analgesics with different mechanism of action can have an increased painkilling effect over the sum of the effect of each individual analgesic.

Several such formulations have disappeared from over-the-counter status in drug store aisles and other retail outlets. One example is APC (aspirin, phenacetin, and caffeine) compound tablets common from the 1940s to 1983; because of harmful side effects of phenacetin, Anacin in the U.S. was reformulated to eliminate it; while Vincent's APC is no longer sold. Some others have been judged to contribute too often to substance abuse.

Lenoltec is a compound analgesic that comes in four strengths:

| No. | Acetaminophen mg | Caffeine mg | Codeine mg | DIN |
|---|---|---|---|---|
| 1 | 300 | 15 | 8 | 00653233 |
| 2 | 300 | 15 | 15 | 00653241 |
| 3 | 300 | 15 | 30 | 00653276 |
| 4 | 300 | 0 | 60 | 00621463 |

Another example is Bex, a once popular Australian compound analgesic which is no longer sold. It contained 42% aspirin, 42% phenacetin, plus caffeine.

The United States Food and Drug Administration also now requires that manufacturers of compound analgesics unequivocally state each ingredient's purpose.
