= Gloria Dawn (actor) =

Australian actress (1929–1978)

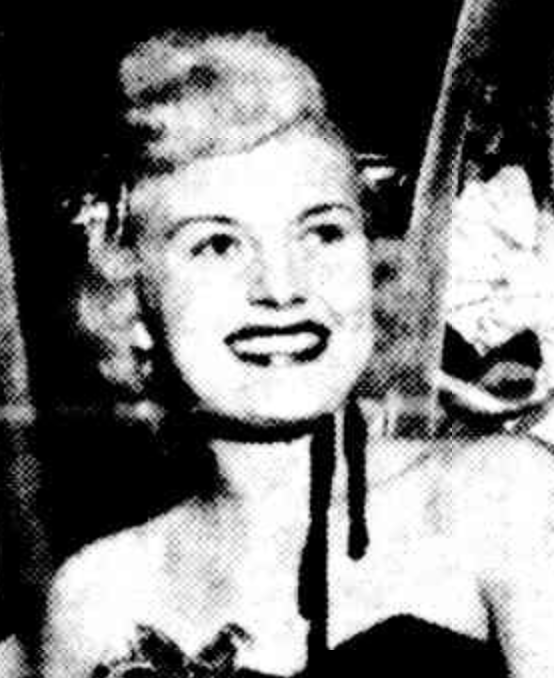
- Dawn, 1949
- Born: 26 February 1929; Melbourne, Victoria, Australia
- Died: 2 April 1978 (aged 49); Camperdown, New South Wales
- Occupations: Actress; choreographer; singer; vaudevillian
- Years active: 1935–1979

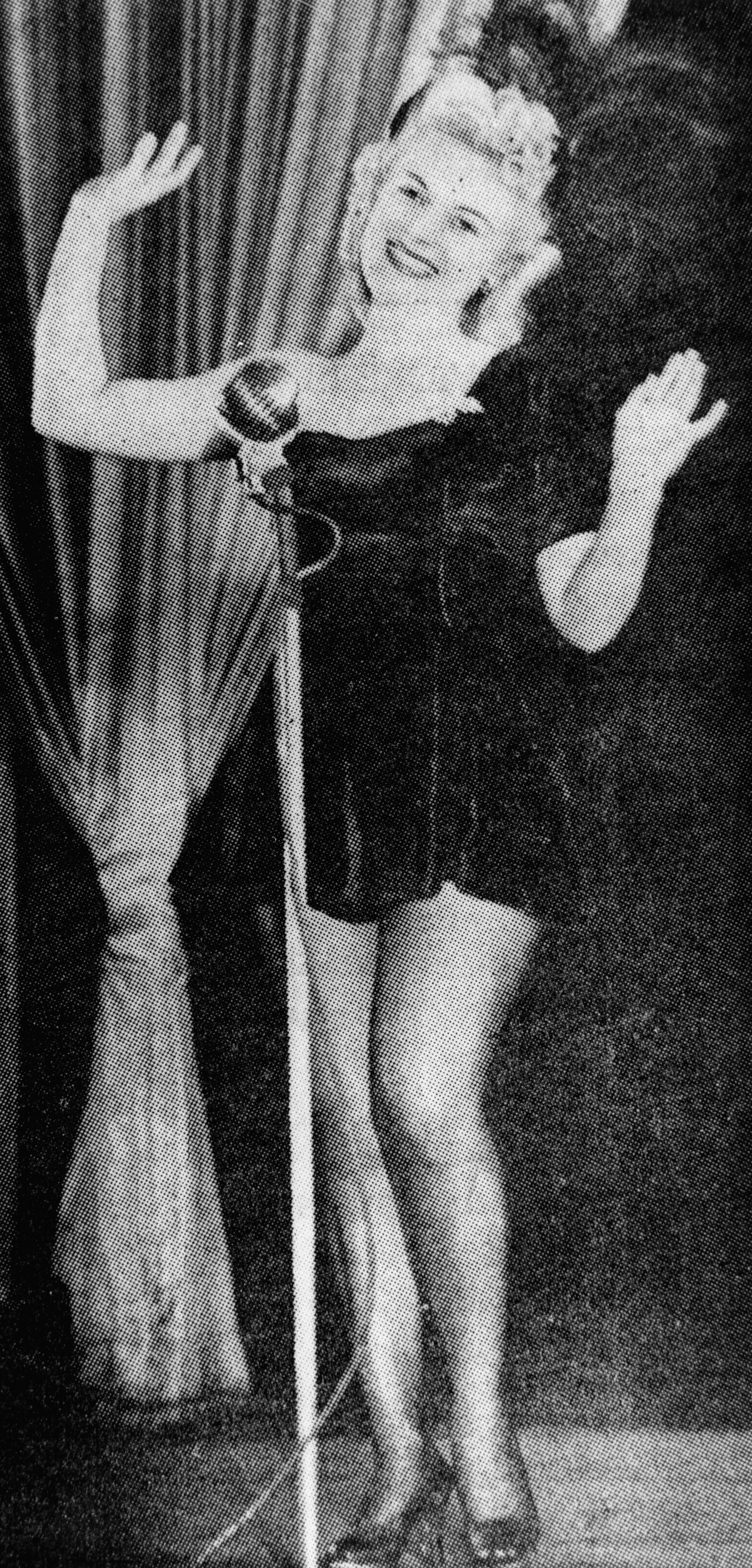
Gloria Dawn at the Cremorne Theatre

Gloria Dawn (26 February 1929 – 2 April 1978) was an Australian actress, choreographer singer and vaudevillian performer. She was one of the leading stars of the stage from the 1950s to her death.

== Early life ==
Dawn was born in Port Melbourne, Victoria, the only daughter of theatrical agent William Edward Evans and Zilla Emma Edith Odling, a native of Thailand. Both her parents were vaudeville performers, known as "Billy and Weatherly", and she toured with them, appearing on stage from infancy and doing Shirley Temple impersonations. At 12 Dawn was one of the Tivoli Gang of juvenile stars, performing in the Crazy Show at the Tivoli Theatre. She also began playing soubrette on stage, in shows such as the Naughty Nineties at the Tivoli.

== Career ==
Dawn made her debut in theatre in 1935 and featured in everything from pantomime, cabaret, vaudeville, revue and musical and comedy drama. In 1949 she was the star of the show, Sunny, at the Cremorne Theatre in Brisbane.

In the 1950s, as the queen of revue, she appeared in productions such as Once Upon a Mattress and C.J. Dennis' iconic The Sentimental Bloke and A Cup of Tea, a Bex and a Good Lie Down. In the 1970s stage roles included The Slaughter House of St. Theresa Day, Mother Courage and A Hard God. According to The Canberra Times, Dawn "won the greatest acclaim of her career for the leading role in Gypsy, a musical based on the life of stripper Gypsy Rose Lee".

In 1977, several months before she died, she appeared on Graham Kennedy's Blankety Blanks.

Her film credits include They're a Weird Mob in 1966 The Mango Tree in 1977.

== Personal life ==
Dawn married variety artist Francis Patrick Cleary in Brisbane on 15 January 1947 and had four children. They separated in 1970.

She died from cancer at the King George V Hospital in Camperdown, Sydney on 2 April 1978.

Filmography

FILM

Film
Year	Title	Role	Type
1966	They're A Weird Mob	Mrs. Chapman	Feature film
1977	The Mango Tree	Pearl	Feature film

TELEVISION

Television
Year	Title	Role	Type
1962	Consider Your Verdict	Guest role	TV series, 1 episode
1972	The Pressure-Pak Show	Regular - Herself	TV series
1972	The Tony Hancock Special	Mrs. Gilroy	TV special
1973	Boney	Guest role: Mother Superior	TV series, 1 episode
1973	Jill	Guest - Herself	TV special
1974	A Hard God	Lead role	ABC TV film
1975	The Graham Kennedy Show	Guest - Herself	TV series, 1 episode
1977	Graham Kennedy's Blankety Blanks	Herself - Panellist	TV series, 5 episodes

STAGE / THEATRE

- The Crazy Show Revue (1940)
- Little Nellie Kelly (1949)
- Once Upon a Mattress
- The Sentimental Bloke (1961)
- A Cup of Tea, a Bex and a Good Lie Down
- But I Wouldn't Want To Live There
- Annie Get Your Gun (1968)
- The Threepenny Opera (1968)
- The Slaughter of St. Teresa's Day (1973)
- Mother Courage (1974)
- Gypsy (1974)
- Young Mo (1975/1977)
