= Liz Harris (actress) =

Australian actress

Elizabeth Harris
- Born: Elizabeth Harris
- Occupation: Actress
- Years active: 1962–1993
- Spouse: Leonard Teale (m. 1968–1994)

Elizabeth Harris is an Australian retired stage and television actress who appeared on a number of popular television series and films from the mid-1960s up until her retirement in 1993. She is best known for her role as Liza in the 1960s children's television series Adventure Island but also for playing recurring characters Sally Dempster in Prisoner and Clover Owen-Jones in A Country Practice in her later career. She was also the wife of longtime Australian television and radio star Leonard Teale. They married on 18 December 1968.

== Biography ==
Harris made her television acting debut on Consider Your Verdict in 1962. From 1962 to 1966 she co-hosted an Australian version of Video Village, with Danny Webb, on Channel 7. She was then cast in the children's television series The Magic Circle Club as a recurring character (and later replacing original host Nancy Cato, who had been injured during production), and made several guest appearances on Homicide between 1965 and 1966. She also starred in a second children's series, Adventure Island (1967) with co-stars Nancy Cato and Ernie Bourne, in what became her breakout role as the series heroine "Liza", and Hunter (1968). In July 1968, she also performed at St. Martin's Theatre with Charles Chilton, Joan Littlewood and Ted Allen in a London Theatre Workshop stage production of Oh, What a Lovely War!

She took an absence from television acting for several years but made brief appearances on The 40s in Swing Time (1973), Alvin Purple (1976) and King's Men (1979). In 1982, she was cast as Sally Dempster in the seriesPrisoner. Although she appeared on the series briefly, Harris had a memorable role as an alcoholic wife of a businessman. Her character is sent to prison for running over her husband and attempts suicide after it is revealed that she was physically abusive to her young daughter.

She also appeared on Sons and Daughters and A Country Practice that same year. Her recurring role as Clover Owen-Jones in the latter series would continue on and off for the next nine years. Harris continued to make television appearances during the 1980s with supporting roles in television films Skin Deep (1984), Shout! The Story of Johnny O'Keefe (1985) and the television series Relative Merits in 1987. Her final television appearance was in G.P. in 1993.

In January 2004, she appeared at a special book signing and screening of Lisa Milner's Fighting Films with Michael Craig and Jack Thompson. Her attendance was in honor of her late husband Leonard Teale who worked with the film company as a voice actor during the 1950s.

== Filmography ==
=== Film ===
Year	Title	Role	Type
1976	The Bushranger		TV film
1984	Skin Deep	Emily Sorensson	TV film

=== Television ===
Year	Title	Role	Type
1962-1966	Video Village	Herself - Mayoress	TV series
1962	Consider Your Verdict	Kath Hutchins	TV series, episode 1.76: "Queen Versus Grant"
1965–1966	Homicide	Shirley Smith / Libby Hart / Lesley Thorne	TV series, 3 episodes, 2.18 “Second Time Around”; 3.04 "Three-Headed Dog"; 3.37 "My Brother Must Rest"
1966	Australian Playhouse		TV series, 1 episode
1967	The Magic Circle Club	Host	TV series, 555 episodes
1967-1972	Adventure Island	Liza / Princess	ABC TV series, 876 episodes
1967	The Barry Creyton Show	Guest	TV series
1967	Bassey At Chequers	Guest - Herself & Leonard Teale	TV Concert special
1968	Hunter	Suzette	TV series, episode 1.43: "The VC Bullet"
1969-1970	In Melbourne Tonight	Guest	TV series, 9 episodes
1969; 1970	Sounds Like Us	Herself	TV series, 2 episodes
1970	Australia's Celebrity Game	Contestant	TV series, 1 episode
1970	The Mike Walsh Show	Guest - Herself	TV series, 1 episode
1972	I've Got A Secret	Herself - Guest	TV series, 1 episode
1972	Bobby Limb's Sound Of Christmas	Guest - Herself & Leonard Teale	TV special
1973	The Graham Kennedy Show	Guest	TV series, 2 episodes
1973	The 40s in Swing Time	Herself	TV series, 6 episodes
1976	Alvin Purple	Miriam	TV series, episode 1.03: "Like Son, Like Father"
1976	This Is Your Life	Guest - Herself	TV series, 1 episode "Leonard Teale"
1976	King's Men		TV series, episode 1.08: "Crusade"
1978; 1979	The Mike Walsh Show	Guest - Herself	TV series, 1 episode
1979	The Mike Walsh Show	Guest - Herself	TV series, 1 episode
1982	Sons and Daughters	Margaret Selmar	TV series, 3 episodes
1982	Prisoner: Cell Block H	Sally Dempster	TV series, 8 episodes
1982; 1985; 1991	A Country Practice	Carol Glover	TV series, episode 2.13: "A Little Knowledge"
1983	The Mike Walsh Show	Guest - Herself with Sue McIntosh	TV series, 1 episode
1985; 1991	A Country Practice	Dee Dee Macrae	TV series, episode 5.15: "Seasons Come & Seasons Go"
1985	Shout! The Story of Johnny O'Keefe	Valda Marshall	TV miniseries, 2 episodes
1987	Relative Merits		TV miniseries
1989–91	A Country Practice	Clover Owen-Jones	TV series
1991	Tonight Live With Steve Vizard	Guest	TV series, 1 episode
1992	The Morning Show	Guest	TV series, 1 episode
1993; 1994	Good Morning Australia	Guest	TV series, 2 episodes
1993	G.P.	Shirley Harrison	TV series, episode 5.06: "A Thousand Flowers"
1994	Homicide... 30 Years On	Herself	TV special
1996	The Crawford Story	Herself	TV special
