= Sue McIntosh =

Australian actress

- Born: Sue Menlove
- Other name: Sue Donovan
- Occupations: Actress, television presenter, journalist
- Spouses: Terence Donovan (m. 1965; div. 1973) John McIntosh (m. 1974)
- Children: 4, including Jason Donovan and Stephanie McIntosh
- Awards: Logie Award Most Popular Female for Victoria (1971)

Sue McIntosh (née Menlove) is an Australian television actress, presenter and journalist.

== Career ==
During the 1960s and 1970s, McIntosh was an actress who worked in British and Australian television. Her early credits include a 1965 episode of The Benny Hill Show from its run on BBC Television, Where the Bullets Fly (1966) and hosting the children's show Adventure Island from 1969 to 1972.

In the 1970s she also featured on The Paul Hogan Show, The Graham Kennedy Show, The Ernie Sigley Show, The Don Lane Show, The Mike Walsh Show and The Ted Hamilton Show. Later she was the host of Take 5 and You Me and Education.

Her acting credits include Matlock Police, Division 4, Homicide and Prisoner.

McIntosh was also a news presenter on ABC News Victoria.

During the early 2000 period McIntosh made a much long-awaited return to TV with her own community TV based show from Melbourne titled Sue McIntosh Presents (2001-2002), in which she interviewed a number of showbiz friends she had known over the years, her most noted guest being Olivia Newton-John during 2001.

== Filmography ==
Film

Title	Year	Role	Type
1966	Where the Bullets Fly	Celia (as Sue Donovan)	Feature film, UK

Television

Title	Year	Role	Type
1956	ABC News	Herself – Newsreader	TV series
1965	The Benny Hill Show	Various roles (as Sue Donovan)	TV series UK, 1 episode
1966	The Baron	Pia Vallachio (as Sue Donovan)	TV series UK, 1 episode
1969	The Cheerful Cuckold	Sybil Morton (as Sue Donovan)	ABC Teleplay
1969–1972	Adventure Island	Herself – Host	ABC TV series, 876 episodes
1970; 1972	Homicide	Susan Blake / Karen (as Sue Donovan)	TV series, 2 episodes
1970; 1973	Division 4	Margaret Fraser / Patty (as Sue Donovan)	TV series, 2 episodes
1970	Sounds Like Us	Herself (as Sue Donovan)	TV series, 1 episode
1970	The Mike Walsh Show	Herself (as Sue Donovan)	TV series, 9 episodes
1971	The 13th Annual TV Week Logie Awards	Herself (as Sue Donovan)	TV special
1972	Matlock Police	unknown role (as Sue Donovan)	TV series
1973	The Graham Kennedy Show	Herself (as Sue Donovan)	TV series, 85 episodes
1974	This Love Affair	unknown role (as Sue Donovan)	TV series, 1 episode
1974	And the Big Men Fly	Hostess (as Sue Donovan)	ABC TV series, 6 episodes
1974–1976	The Ernie Sigley Show	Herself (as Sue Donovan)	TV series, 129 episodes
1975–1983	The Don Lane Show	Herself (as Sue Donovan)	TV series
1976	Ernie	Herself (as Sue Donovan)	TV series
1977–1984	The Paul Hogan Show	Herself / Various characters (as Sue Donovan)	TV series
1978; 1980	The Mike Walsh Show	Guest - Herself	TV series, 1 episode
1979	Prisoner	TV Interviewer (as Sue Donovan)	TV series, 2 episodes
1980; 1983	The Mike Walsh Show	Guest - Herself	TV series, 1 episode
1980	The Prophersies of Hoges	Herself in Various characters	TV Special
1980	The Ted Hamilton Show	Herself (as Sue Donovan)	TV series, 4 episodes
1981	Channel Nine Celebrates: 25 Years Of Television	Herself in audience	TV special
1981	Six Tonight	Presenter	TV series, 1 episode
1983	The Mike Walsh Show	Guest - Herself with Liz Harris	TV series, 1 episode
1984	The Paul Hogan Show	Herself (as Sue Donovan / McIntosh)	TV series, 1 episode
2001–2002	Sue McIntosh Presents	Herself - Presenter / Interviewer (as Sue McIntosh)	TV series
2001	An Audience with John Farnham	Herself as audience member with Olivia Newton-John	TV Special
2002	Today	Herself as 'Hair' audience member	TV series, 1 episode
2009	Lights! Camera! Party! Television City Celebrates	Herself - Audience Guest (as Sue McIntosh)	TV special
2022	The Morning Show	Herself – Voice over on her friend Olivia Newton-John (as Sue McIntosh)	TV series, 1 episode

== Awards ==
As Sue Donovan, she received the Victorian Most Popular Female Logie Award for 1971.

== Personal life ==
McIntosh, was born on 11 September 1946. She was known as Sue Donovan previously, from her teenage wedding, in 1965, to veteran actor Terence Donovan. Their marriage ended in an acrimonious divorce in 1973, and she lost custody of her five-year-old son, Jason Donovan. He started his acting career as a child and later became a singer. They became estranged following his revealing 2007 autobiography, Between The Lines, My Story Uncut. She was denied a right of reply to his book and was not invited to his 2008 wedding.

Her maiden name of Menlove was confirmed in the BBC One programme, Who Do You Think You Are? in which Jason, participated. It was aired on 30 August 2010.

She married John McIntosh in 1974, they have three daughters: Katherine, Olivia and actress Stephanie McIntosh.

Media offices
Preceded by Mary Delahunty	ABC News Victoria; Weeknight presenter 1991	Succeeded by Ian Henderson
