= Colin McEwan =

Australian actor, host, comedian and announcer

- Born: 1941; Alloa, Scotland
- Died: 21 August 2005, (aged 64); Gold Coast, Queensland, Australia
- Occupations: Actor; host; comedian; radio announcer
- Years active: 1957–1998
- Spouse: Rae McEwan
- Children: David McEwan

Colin McEwan (1941 – 21 August 2005) was a Scottish born Australian actor, host, comedian and radio announcer. He was best known for appearing on both the stage and TV versions of The Naked Vicar Show, and the sequel on which it was based, opposite Ross Higgins playing Ted Bullpitt's brother Bob Bullpitt in Kingswood Country and also appeared in the miniseries Day of the Roses. He worked as an announcer on Melbourne radio stations 3AK and 3XY, and was a regular guest on TV variety program In Melbourne Tonight.

== Biography ==
McEwan was born in Alloa, Scotland (1941). Following the death of his father, he immigrated to Melbourne, Australia (1947), with his mother and three brothers. McEwan's acting roles included parts in a large number of TV series and mini-series, including the regular roles of Detective Sergeant Dan Cullen in Ryan, Nick in Brass Monkeys, and numerous guest appearances in programs including Homicide, the television adaptation of And The Big Men Fly (1974), The Rise and Fall of Wellington Boots (1975), Cop Shop, Sam's Luck (1980), The Last Bastion (1984), The Boardroom (1988), Jackaroo (1990), and The Gift (1997).

He started his career in radio in 1957; early work included announcing on 3CV in central Victoria, and he moved to Melbourne's 3XY in 1960. Publicity claimed that he was the youngest announcer in Australia at the time. He worked on overnight and breakfast shows.

In 1964, he joined the fledgling ATV-0 as a news reader and general announcer, but soon became the station's 'jack of all trades', playing the roles of Gasper Goblin, Cassius Cuckoo and Leonardo da Funbird in ATV-O's popular national 1960s children's TV show Magic Circle Club (1965–67), starring as Ocker Ramsay in the 1967 comedy series Hey You!, and appearing in many other ATV-O programs including Off to the Races (1967–69), Fredd Bear's Breakfast-A-Go-Go (1969–72), Musical Cashbox (1969–71, which he also produced for a brief period), and hosting programs including Carosello (1967–68), and 1968's Rendezvous (which he also produced and directed). He also played the roles of Miser Meanie and Gussie Galah in Adventure Island (1967–72), and appeared as a regular on The Ernie Sigley Show (1974–75), and Turpie Tonight (1982–83).

In 1967, TV Week told its readers that McEwan was shortly to marry Claudia Topusoff, who had been secretary of ATV0's publicity manager, at St. John's Presbyterian Church, Warrandyte. In 1972 McEwan and his second wife Pamela had a son, David. In 1980, McEwan moved to Perth; discussing his motivation, he told Fiona Manning of the Australian Women's Weekly that 'I'd always wanted to go there and figured if anyone wanted me I could hop on a plane.' The following year, he married for the third time, to Rae Alty, who the Women's Weekly told readers was 'advertising sales manager for a WA magazine'. The two had met in Melbourne. In Perth, McEwan did advertising work and starred in a Perth TV show, The Entertainers, with Barrie Barkla and John Burgess. In 1981 he announced he had the license to launch a West Australian version of The Naked Vicar Show.

== Filmography ==
=== Film ===
Year	Title	Role	Notes
1988	The Boardroom	Donald Malone	TV movie

=== Television ===
Year	Title	Role	Notes
1964	ATV-0	News reader / general announcer	TV news show
1964	Luther	Monk	TV play
1965-67	Magic Circle Club	Gasper Goblin / Cassius Cuckoo / Leonardo da Funbird	TV series
1967	Hey You!	Ocker Ramsay	TV series
1967-69	Off to the Races		TV series
1969-72	Fredd Bear's Breakfast-A-Go-Go		TV series
1969-71	Musical Cashbox		(also producer for a brief period)
1967-68	Carosello	Host	TV series
1967-72	Adventure Island	Miser Meanie / Gussie Galah	TV series
1968	Rendezvous	Host	TV series (also producer & director)
1973-74	Ryan	Detective Sergeant Dan Cullen	TV series
1974	And The Big Men Fly	Wobbly Coates	TV series
1974-75	The Ernie Sigley Show	Regular guest	TV series
	Homicide	Guest appearance	TV series
1975	The Rise and Fall of Wellington Boots		TV series
1978-80	Cop Shop	Dave Kelly / Lou Evans / Stan Dawson	TV series, 3 episodes
1980	Sam's Luck	Uncle Harry	TV series, 6 episodes
1980-84	Kingswood Country	Bob Bullpitt	TV series, 22 episodes
1982-83	Turpie Tonight	Regular guest	TV series
1984	Brass Monkeys	Nick	TV series
1984	The Last Bastion	Frank Forde	TV miniseries, 3 episodes
1990	Jackaroo	Roy Mallory	TV miniseries, 2 episodes
1997	Bullpitt!	Bob Bullpitt	TV series, 2 episodes
1997	The Gift		TV series

== Discography ==
McEwan released a number of comedy records, some under his own name, others under the name of Luigi Risotto, a heavily accented Italian character.

=== Albums ===
List of albums, with selected chart positions
Title	Album details	Peak chart positions
Title	Album details	AUS
Live from The Madge Burrows Room! / The Naked Vicar Show (with Ross Higgins, Kev Golsby and Julie McGregor)	Released: 1978; Format: LP; Label: EMI (EMC-2671)	84

== Death ==
He died of cancer after lapsing into a coma at a Gold Coast hospital on 21 August 2005.
