= John-Michael Howson =

Australian journalist (born 1936)

John-Michael Howson OAM
- Born: 8 August 1936 (age 90); Elwood, Victoria, Australia
- Other name: 'Hollywood'
- Occupations: Screenwriter; playwright; newspaper and magazine journalist; composer; lyricist; producer; actor; TV personality; talkback radio contributor
- Employer: Freelance

John-Michael Howson OAM (born 8 August 1936) is an Australian writer, reporter, entertainer and Melbourne radio commentator. His involvement in the Australian entertainment scene as a writer, producer and performer spans more than 50 years.

== Early life ==
Howson was born on 8 August 1936, in Elwood, Victoria. His parents separated when he was young and he moved to Western Australia with his mother and step-father (a former policeman and publican). He was educated at St Ildephonsus College, New Norcia, where he was a boarder.

== Career ==
Howson began his media career as a cadet reporter on Mildura's Sunraysia Daily. After moving to Melbourne he started writing sketches and songs for amateur and professional groups and subsequently moved to London. There he worked for a men's fashion magazine and covered fashion topics in London and Europe. He pursued his writing career with comedy scripts for live revues, stand-up comedians and television including the top British show That Was The Week That Was. In 1964, he was invited to write topical material for the fledgling Melbourne television station ATV-0 and specifically for their new variety programme The Ray Taylor Show.

He became primarily known in television for his involvement in the acclaimed ATV-0 children's fantasy television series The Magic Circle Club (1965–67) in which he played Fee Fee Bear (his face never seen on camera due to the bear suit), and as Clown in the follow-up ABC show Adventure Island, (1967–72). Howson, with Godfrey Philipp, was co-creator of both shows. Howson wrote the vast bulk of the scripts (five 30-minute shows per week) and the lyrics to the original songs used in them, the music usually composed by Bruce Rowland. Owing to Howson's intense workload, many of the Adventure Island scripts were written on a typewriter positioned behind the set. Howson also contributed scripts and sketches to Graham Kennedy's In Melbourne Tonight and to The Mavis Bramston Show. His 1965 Bramston "Flower arranging" sketch – in which a section of Constance Spry's definitive text book on the subject is quoted verbatim in a lascivious manner by the Chief Censor (Gordon Chater) to hilarious and scandalous effect – created a national uproar and remains a television classic.

=== Film and television acting ===
In 1975, Howson appeared as an over-attentive bellboy in the Australian movie Alvin Rides Again. In 1976, producer-director George Stamkoski filmed a documentary portrait of Howson entitled "Hollywood Hollywood" with a grant from the Australian Film Commission. Howson revealed the serious side of his acting skills in the 1976 ABC television adaptation of Frank Hardy's Power Without Glory. He also briefly appeared in the 1978 film The ABC of Love and Sex: Australia Style and also in the soft porn film Felicity, directed by John D. Lamond. During the 1980s, he starred in Houseboat Horror, an Australian feature film shot to videotape, and often included on lists of the worst movies ever made.

=== Theatrical productions ===
In the late 1960s, Howson also turned his talents as a scriptwriter and lyricist to the creation of original Australian stage musicals, working in collaboration with local composers. Early examples included Razza-ma-tazz (and all that Jazz), which was set in Melbourne's pre-war Red-light district, Little Lonsdale Street. With a cast that included veteran stage actress Madeleine Orr, the show was produced at the Southland Theatre in 1968. That same year, Howson collaborated with Peter Pinne and Don Battye on the musical It happened in Tanjablanka, which was a spoof of Hollywood in the 1940s. In 1972, Howson wrote What's in a name, a straight play on the subject of prejudice and intolerance in modern society, which was performed at St Paul's Cathedral in Melbourne. The following year, he adapted the play Norman, Is That You? for Australian audiences, which had successful seasons in Melbourne and Sydney. The adaptation included a new title song, co-written by Howson with composer Peter Best, which was recorded and released as a single by the show's star, Bobby Limb.

The late 1990s saw Howson return to the creation of stage musicals, albeit this time in the form of jukebox musicals rather than entirely original shows with original music. Shout! The Legend of The Wild One, a stage musical about the life of singer Johnny O'Keefe, was co-written by Howson with Melvyn Morrow and David Mitchell, and made its premiere in Melbourne in the early 2000s (decade). With the same team, Howson also co-wrote a musical about Dusty Springfield called Dusty – The Original Pop Diva, which opened in Melbourne in 2006. In 2007, it was reported that Howson was collaborating on a new musical, Hotel Havana, with composer Jason Sprague. Other original musicals Howson developed included Pyjamas in Paradise, about teenage parties at Surfers Paradise, Queensland, and Dream Lover, a jukebox musical about Bobby Darin.

=== Reporter ===
He is sometimes referred to as "John-Michael 'Hollywood' Howson" when filing showbiz news reports, a nickname first coined by Mike Walsh when Howson began appearing on The Mike Walsh Show. His reports continued when the show was replaced by The Midday Show with Ray Martin. Howson became well known for his flamboyant, clever and catty commentary on the celebrity A-list. Determined to further his writing career, Howson moved to West Hollywood but remained a reporter for Network Ten's Good Morning Australia with Bert Newton. He also reported for 3AW with Ernie Sigley, and remained a 3AW regular until his dismissal over controversial comments in November 2017.

=== Writer ===
Howson's book I Found It at the Flickers, an autobiographical account of his growing up in Melbourne emphasising his love of the cinema, was published by Horwitz Grahame Books in 1985. Howson has published two collections of horror stories – Once Upon a Nightmare: Ten Tales with a Twist (Pan Macmillan, 1998) and Deadly Dreams: Ten More Tales with Twist (Pan Macmillan, 2000).

=== Radio panelist ===
Howson was a regular panelist on 3AW's Sunday morning program, 'Sunday Morning'. During his appearances on 3AW, Howson has adopted vehemently anti-Muslim views, indicating that he would prefer not to talk to Muslims and referring to Muslims as "skilled propagandists". The Australian Broadcasting Corporation's Media Watch program did a segment outlining Howson's behaviour and views in May 2010.

In February 2011, Howson had an abusive on-air tantrum over the Seven Network's treatment of Opposition Leader and future Prime Minister Tony Abbott, in an interview with journalist Mark Riley. He verbally abused his radio 3AW co-presenter Nick McCallum, who was also a Channel Seven reporter and hurled sexist insults at a female producer, Cushla Travers.

In 2012, he called Julian Assange's mother "a pig" and taunted her with a Nazi slogan, for which he apologised but was suspended for a month. In 2016, Howson used a derogatory term when discussing African gangs. He told the Herald Sun, "I don’t care if people think it was racist, it was a name that came into my head". 3AW management issued a statement later that day, "3AW does not condone the use of a derogatory term by John-Michael Howson on the Sunday Morning program today".

In November 2017, Howson went on a rant about "anti-coal nutjobs", suggesting climate change activists should kill themselves. He was forced to apologise later that day and meet management to discuss broadcasting codes and content. He was subsequently dismissed from 3AW.

== Honours ==
Howson was awarded an Order of Australia Medal in the 2009 Queen's Birthday Honours list "for service to the entertainment industry as a writer and performer".

== Personal life ==
Howson lived in the Melbourne suburb of Balaclava for many years. He then moved to Los Angeles for 17 years and now holds dual US-Australian citizenship.

Following the success of Shout he returned to Melbourne in 2006 where he lives with his Guatemalan partner, Alfie, and their three dogs. In recent years, Howson has been open about his homosexuality, a subject about which he was previously very guarded, mainly due to his conservative Roman Catholic beliefs.

== Community service ==
Howson is a patron of both the Melbourne Gay and Lesbian Chorus and of the St James the Great annual St Francis's Day Blessing of Animals.

== Filmography ==
=== Film ===
Year	Title	Role	Notes
1974	Alvin Rides Again	Bell Boy	
1978	The ABC of Love and Sex: Australia Style	Leatherman at orgy	Documentary
1978	Felicity	Adrian/lingerie salesman	
1980	Nightmares	Bennett Collingwood	Known as Stage Fright in the United States
1984	Second Time Lucky	Devil's Assistant	
1989	Houseboat Horror	'J'	Direct-to-video
1994	Muriel's Wedding	Himself	Uncredited
2008	Not Quite Hollywood: The Wild, Untold Story of Ozploitation!	Himself	Documentary
2009	Remembering Nigel	Himself	
2022	Pushing the Boundaries: The Mavis Bramston Show	Himself	Documentary

=== Television ===
Year	Title	Role	Notes
1965–1967	Magic Circle Club	Fee Fee Bear	Also writer
1967	Hey You!	Writer	Also creator (with Godfrey Philipp)
1969	Sounds Like Us	Clown	
1967–1972	Adventure Island	Clown and Golden Harp	Also creator (with Godfrey Philipp) and writer
1976	Power Without Glory	Fashion Designer	TV miniseries
1976–1983	The Don Lane Show	Himself	Various appearances
1978	Good Morning Sydney	Himself	Host Entertainment
1980	The Royal Charity Concert	Himself	TV movie
1980	Catch Us If You Can	Himself	TV special
1981–1984	The Mike Walsh Show	Himself	Various appearances (as Entertainment Reporter)
1994	The Gordon Elliott Show	Himself	
1997	Tracey Takes On...	Reg Redpath	
2000	Russell Gilbert Live	Himself	Guest
2001	Rove Live	Himself	Guest
2004–2005	Good Morning Australia	Himself	Various appearances (as Entertainment Reporter)
2005–2011	20 to One	Himself	Media commentator
2006	Bert's Family Feud	Himself	Contestant/Team captain/Audience member
2006	Spicks and Specks	Himself	Guest
2021	Studio 10	Himself	Guest

== See also ==
- List of playwrights
