= Brian Crossley =

English actor & director (1926-2012)

- Born: Brian Stow Crossley; 5 October 1926; Shipley, West Yorkshire, England
- Died: 8 September 2012 (aged 85); Melbourne, Victoria, Australia
- Education: Birmingham School of Speech and Drama
- Occupations: Actor; director; drama tutor
- Years active: 1945-?
- Known for: Director of the National Theatre, Adventure Island, The Box as producer/director
- Notable work: Gilbert and Sullivan

Brian Stow Crossley (5 October 1926 – 8 September 2012) was an English-born actor, director and drama tutor, who after starting his career in his native country, emigrated to Australia. He appeared in and directed numerous roles in theatre and on television over a career spanning more than 50 years, including directing straight theatre, musicals, opera and operetta.

== Biography ==
He was born in Shipley in West Yorkshire, England to engineering draughtsman Harry Crossley and Minnie Stow. He attended Birmingham College of Speech and Drama and performed as part of Birmingham Repertory Theatre, he appeared in a production of Gilbert and Sullivan's Patience and in 1950 was invited to join the chorus for the D'Oyly Carte Opera Company, playing a variety of small roles. In 1952 he played in Gay's the Word on the West End, he emigrated to Australia in 1954, where he moved to Melbourne to join the Union Theatre Repertory Company. He toured Australia and New Zealand in 1956 with the J. C. Williamson Gilbert and Sullivan Opera Company, but with the arrival of television he turned his attention to the screen.

He appeared in a variety of television programs, including Homicide, Division 4 and Consider Your Verdict, as well as directing for serial The Box. His most successful role was on children's series Adventure Island, where he played Mrs Flower Potts from 1967 to 1972.

During this period he also directed for the stage; his first directing project was Christoph Willibald Gluck's Orfeo ed Euridice for the Victorian State Opera; he subsequently directed Benjamin Britten's The Rape of Lucretia, Domenico Cimarosa's The Secret Marriage and Franz Joseph Haydn's L'infedeltà delusa and collaborated extensively with Dennis Olsen. He directed a wide variety of Gilbert and Sullivan operettas and in 1973 was appointed a director of the National Theatre's Opera School. He moved to the Darling Downs Institute of Advanced Education in Queensland around 1982.

Crossley died in Melbourne on 8 September 2012, aged 85.

== Television ==
=== Actor ===
Year	Production	Role	Type
1969	Sounds Like Us		TV series
1970	Homicide	Richards	TV series
1969–70	Division 4	Trixie – Interior Decorator	TV series
1966–72	Adventure Island	Mrs. Flower Potts / Gracie Galah	TV series

=== Director ===
Year	Production	Role	Type
1974–76	The Box	Director	TV series, 24 episodes
1980	The Ioslanthe	Director	TV movie

=== Producer ===
Year	Production	Role	Type
1974	The Box	Producer	TV series, 10 episodes

== Theatre (selected) ==
=== Actor ===
Year	Production	Role	Venue / Company
1948	Let the People Live	Actor	Birmingham Repertory Theatre
1948	Peer Gynt	Actor	Birmingham Repertory Theatre
1950–51	Patience	Mr. Bunthorne's Solicitor / Major Murgatroyd	D’Oyly Carte Opera Company, Malvern, Worcestershire
1950–51	The Yeomen of the Guard	First Citizen	D’Oyly Carte Opera Company, Malvern, Worcestershire
1952	Gay's the Word		West End, London
1954	Tram Stop 10!	Actor	University of Melbourne
1955	Under the Sycamore Tree	Actor	University of Melbourne
1955	Twelfth Night	Actor	University of Melbourne & VIC/SA regional tour
1955	The Dark is Light Enough	Actor	University of Melbourne
1955	The Time of Your Life	Actor	University of Melbourne
1955	You Never Can Tell	Actor	University of Melbourne
1955	The Barretts of Wimpole Street	Actor	University of Melbourne
1955	The Man	Actor	University of Melbourne
1955	Return Fare	Actor	University of Melbourne
1956	The Gondoliers	The Duke	VIC regional tour
1956	Arms and the Man	Actor	VIC regional tour
1956	Trial by Jury	Associate	Theatre Royal, Adelaide
1956	The Yeomen of the Guard	Actor / Singer	Theatre Royal, Adelaide
1958	Cox and Box / H.M.S. Pinafore	Actor	Theatre Royal, Adelaide
1958	Hotel Paradiso	Actor	University of Melbourne
1958	The Knight of the Burning Pestle	Actor	University of Melbourne
1961; 1964	Alice in Wonderland	White Rabbit	Comedy Theatre, Melbourne, Tivoli Theatre, Melbourne
1962; 1963	Noddy in Toyland	Mr Pink-Whistle	Comedy Theatre, Melbourne, Theatre Royal, Sydney
1963	Where Do We Go From Here?	Actor	St Martins Theatre, Melbourne
1968	A Thousand and One Stars	Actor	Her Majesty’s Theatre, Melbourne
1974	Death of a Salesman	Actor	SGIO Theatre with Queensland Theatre
1975	The Wedding of Count Potocki		South Australia
1978	The White Horse Inn	Grinkle	Canberra Theatre
1980	Jack and the Beanstalk	Actor	VIC regional tour
1980	Goldilocks	Actor	VIC regional tour
1980	Red Riding Hood	Actor	VIC regional tour
1980	Alice in Wonderland	Actor	VIC regional tour
1980	The Old Woman Who Lived in a Shoe	Actor	VIC regional tour
1980	Cinderella	Actor	Northland Shopping Centre Theatre, Melbourne & VIC regional tour

=== Director/crew ===
Year	Production	Role	Venue / Company
1955	You Never Can Tell	Assistant Stage Manager	University of Melbourne
1955	Design for Living	Assistant Stage Manager	University of Melbourne
1955	The Barretts of Wimpole Street	Assistant Stage Manager	University of Melbourne
1955	The Man	Stage Manager	University of Melbourne
1960	Nothing Sacred	Producer	Star Theatre, Melbourne
1961	The Importance of Being Earnest	Director	University of Melbourne
1965	Alice in Wonderland	Director	Her Majesty’s Theatre, Adelaide
1968; 1969	It Happened In Tanjablanca	Director	Viaduct Theatre Club, Melbourne
1969	The Rape of Lucretia	Director	St Martins Theatre, Melbourne
1969	L'Orfeo	Director	St Martins Theatre, Melbourne with Victorian Opera
1970	Count Ory	Director	Camberwell Civic Centre with Victorian Opera
1971	The Deluded Infidel (aka L’infedeltà delusa or Deceit Outwitted)	Producer	Camberwell Civic Centre with Victorian Opera
1971	The Secret of Susannah / Help! Help! The Globollinks	Director	Princess Theatre, Melbourne
1974	The Gondoliers	Producer	Festival Theatre, Adelaide
1975; 1977; 1978	The Gondoliers	Director	Sydney Opera House, Princess Theatre, Melbourne
1975; 1978	The Mikado	Producer	Festival Theatre, Adelaide,
1975	Albert Herring	Director	National Theatre, Melbourne
1976	Iolanthe	Director	Sydney Opera House, Festival Theatre, Adelaide
1977	The Mikado	Director	Sydney Opera House
1978; 1980	The Masters	Writer / Director	Comedy Theatre, Melbourne, Seymour Centre, Sydney, Playhouse, Adelaide, Civic Theatre, Burnie, Princess Theatre, Launceston, Theatre Royal, Hobart, Canberra Theatre
1978	The Yeomen of the Guard	Director	Festival Theatre, Adelaide, Princess Theatre, Melbourne, Regent Theatre, Sydney
1979	Cox and Box / H.M.S. Pinafore	Director	Princess Theatre, Melbourne
1979	H.M.S. Pinafore	Director	Canberra Theatre, Polly Woodside, Melbourne
1980	The Pirates of Penzance	Director	National Theatre, Melbourne, Canberra Theatre
1980	Lock Up Your Daughters	Director	National Theatre, Melbourne, Monash University
1981	The Medium	Producer	National Theatre, Melbourne
1985	The Little Sweep	Director	Melbourne Concert Hall
1987	Princess Ida or, Castle Adamant	Director	Canberra Theatre
	The Secret Marriage	Director	
	My Fair Lady	Director	
