= Hey You! (TV series) =

- Genre: Sitcom
- Created by: Godfrey Philipp; John-Michael Howson
- Directed by: Godfrey Philipp
- Starring: Colin McEwan; Ernie Bourne
- Country of origin: Australia
- Original language: English
- No. of episodes: 16

Production
- Producer: Godfrey Philipp

Original release
- Network: 0-10 Network
- Release: 12 August – 2 December 1967

Hey You! is an Australian television sitcom which first screened on the 0-10 Network in 1967 and ran for 16 episodes. It was created by Godfrey Philipp and John-Michael Howson; Howson was credited as 'John Howson' on the pilot episode.

The show was set in inner-city Melbourne and typically revolved around the alcohol-inspired escapades of roommates Ocker Ramsay and Hugh T. Worthington, and their landlady Mrs. McNugg (sometimes credited as 'McNug').

== Cast ==
- Colin McEwan as Ocker Ramsay
- Ernie Bourne as Major Hugh T. Worthington
- Margaret Reid as Mrs. Myrtle McNugg
- Sue Israel as Miss Farthingale
- George Whaley as Simpkins
- Lyndel Rowe as Sharlene
- Marion Edward as Miss Spain

== Episodes ==
No.	Title	Melbourne air date	Additional air dates
1	"The Boarder"	12 August 1967	Sydney: 26 September 1967; Brisbane: 28 October 1967
2	"The Treasure Hunt"	19 August 1967	N/A
3	"The Soup Kitchen"	26 August 1967	Sydney: 3 October 1967; Brisbane: 11 November 1967
4	"The Inheritance"	2 September 1967	Brisbane: 25 November 1967
5	"The Niece"	9 September 1967	Brisbane: 2 December 1967
6	"The Party"	16 September 1967	Brisbane: 9 December 1967
7	"The Marriage Bureau"	23 September 1967	Brisbane: 16 December 1967
8	"The Protest Meeting"	30 September 1967	Sydney: 31 October 1967; Brisbane: 23 December 1967
9	"The Girl Friend"	7 October 1967	N/A
10	"The Singer"	14 October 1967	N/A
11	"The Youth Club"	21 October 1967	N/A
12	"The Exile"	28 October 1967	N/A
13	"The Crisis"	4 November 1967	Sydney: 14 November 1967
14	"The Cold"	11 November 1967	N/A
15	"The Visit"	25 November 1967	N/A
16	"The End"	2 December 1967	Sydney: 26 December 1967

== See also ==
- List of Australian television series
