= Off to the Races =

Off to the Races may refer to:

- Off to the Races (film), a 1937 American comedy film directed by Frank R. Strayer
- Off to the Races (Donald Byrd album), a 1958 jazz album by American trumpeter Donald Byrd
- Off to the Races (Jukebox the Ghost album), a 2018 power pop album by Jukebox the Ghost
- Off to the Races (TV series), an Australian television game show which aired from 1967 to 1969
- "Off to the Races" (song), a 2011 song by American singer and songwriter Lana Del Rey
