= Kevin Shegog =

Australian singer

- Born: Kevin Joseph Alfted Shegog; 20 August 1933; Lower Turner Marsh, Tasmania, Australia
- Died: 9 November 2000 (aged 67) Wallaroo, South Australia
- Genre: Country
- Occupations: Singer-songwriter, musician
- Instruments: Vocals, guitar
- Years active: 1955–1975
- Labels: W&G, Canetoad, Octagon, Planet

Kevin Joseph Alfred Shegog (20 August 1933 – 9 November 2000) was an Australian country music singer from rural Tasmania. From 1960 to 1962 he released three top 40 singles, "Little Kangaroo", a cover version of Claude King's hit "Wolverton Mountain" and "One Small Photograph".

== Biography ==
Kevin Joseph Alfred Shegog, was born on 20 August 1933 in Lower Turner Marsh near Launceston, Tasmania to Joseph (1902–1995) and Elvie Shegog (née Briant, 1910–1989). His parents were dairy farmers. When he was nine years old, Shegog taught himself to play guitar by listening to country songs on radio. He was also a member of the choir at Lower Turner Marsh State School. At the age of fourteen, he started performing at venues and began to write songs. He performed "western music" at a concert in Longford in June 1953. In 1955 the singer relocated to Melbourne (and later to Shepparton, Victoria) and joined the Gold-Toppers. He recorded his first tracks in 1959 with Planet Records, Melbourne, who released recordings by The Andre Schuster Ensemble and Judy Banks. Shegog's Planet recordings appeared on a five-track extended play, Deep Down in Shegog (1959) and include his cover versions of "Riders in the Sky", "High Noon", "Mule Train" and "The Cry of the Wild Goose".

Kevin Shegog and the Gold-Toppers released Shegog's written single, "Little Kangaroo", in late 1960 via W&G Records. It had been issued earlier that year by fellow Country and Western singer, Johnny Ashcroft. It depicts Ned Kelly's girlfriend "The Roo". Shegog's most popular single, "Wolverton Mountain" (1962), is a rendition of Claude King's song, which was released in the United States in the same year. A W&G executive had learned of King's proposed single and arranged for the Australian to record it before the US version had appeared. Shegog's version reached No. 3 on the Melbourne singles chart. His next charting single, "Fall Out Shelter" (1962) reached the top 40. Shegog continued touring into the mid-1970s.

== Personal life ==
Shegog married Shirley May (née Haas) (1936–1981). Shegog and Haas were dating by August 1954. The couple had five children, Dallas, Susan, Lorena, Angela and Travis (1972–1994). From 1970 the family lived in Melbourne's suburbs of Preston, Reservoir and then Box Hill. Shegog was a distant cousin of Vivian Bullwinkel.

=== Death ===
Shegog died on 9 November 2000 in Wallaroo, South Australia at the age of 67 from complications of a stroke he had seven years earlier. His ashes were buried with Shirley and Travis in Springvale, Victoria.

=== Legacy ===
In 1983, Shegog was inducted into the Australian Country Music 'Hands of Fame' cornerstone.

== Discography ==
=== Albums ===
Title	Label	Year
Kevin Shegog	W&G	1962
Country Concert (by Kevin Shegog and the Hawking Brothers)	W&G	1962
Great Country & Western Songs	W&G	1963
Kevin Shegog's Greatest Hits	W&G	1964
A History of Country and Western Music	W&G	1965
The Kevin Shegog Album	W&G	1965
The Best of Kevin Shegog	Master	1966
Kevin Shegog Goes Nashville	W&G	1968
Big Country Songs	W&G	1970
Modern Country Songs	W&G	1972
Rodeo Man	W&G	1973
Kevin Shegog	W&G	1974
Honky Tonk Girl	R&H	1985

=== Compilation albums ===
Title	Label	Year
Greatest Hits	W&G	n/a
Ballad of a Hillbilly Singer	Canetoad Records	2004 (posthumous release)

=== Extended plays ===
Title	Label	Year
Deep Down in Shegog	Planet Records	1959
The Best of Kevin Shegog (by Kevin Shegog and the Gold-Toppers)	W&G	1960
Songs of Praise	W&G	1962
Wolverton Mountain	W&G	1962
King of Country & Western	W&G	1964
Great Country & Western Songs (Vol, 2)	W&G	1964
One Small Photograph (by Kevin Shegog and the Gold-Toppers)	W&G	1964
Kevin Shegog Sings Favourites	W&G	1965

=== Singles ===
Title	Label	Year
"Little Kangaroo" (by Kevin Shegog and the Gold-Toppers)	W&G	1960
"My Blues & Me" (by Kevin Shegog and the Gold-Toppers)	W&G	1961
"One Small Photograph"	W&G	1961
"I'm So in Love with You" (by Kevin Shegog and the Jack Varney Group)	W&G	1961
"A Prayer for Baby" (by Kevin Shegog and the Jack Varney Group)	W&G	1961
"Jambalaya" (by Kevin Shegog and the Gold-Toppers)	W&G	1961
"Wayward Rambler" (by Kevin Shegog and the Gold-Toppers)	W&G	1961
"Knoxville Girl"	W&G	1961
"Big Old Lazy River"	W&G	1962
"Fall-Out Shelter"	W&G	1962
"Your Answer to Me"	W&G	1962
"I'm on the Right Road Now"	W&G	1962
"Cutie" (by Kevin Shegog and the Hawking Brothers)	W&G	1962
"I Can't Stop Loving You"	W&G	1962
"Oh Gee, What's Wrong with Me"	W&G	1962
"Wolverton Mountain"	W&G	1962
"You Weren't Invited, but You Were There"	n/a	1962
"Cowboy Boots "	n/a	1963
"Love Me a Little Bit"	n/a	1963
"From Here On"	n/a	1963
"Lorena"	n/a	1963
"I've Got the World by the Tail"	n/a	1963
"Silent Tears"	n/a	1963
"Talk Back Trembling Lips" (by Kevin Shegog, Bruce Clarke's Orchestra and Vocal Group)	W&G	1963
"Wealthy John"	n/a	1963
"The Strange Little Melody"	n/a	1963
"When I Gave You My Heart"	n/a	1963
"Don't Bug the Beatles"	n/a	1964
"If You Were in My Shoes"	n/a	1964
"Great Big Casey"	n/a	1964
"Pretty Blue Ribbons"	n/a	1964
"Saginaw, Michigan"	n/a	1964
"A Huggin' and a Kissin'"	n/a	1964
"It Hurts So Much (To See You Go)"	n/a	1965
"Phar Lap (The Red Terror)"	n/a	1965
"Johnny Was a Friend of Mine"	n/a	1965
"Apple Blossom Belle"	n/a	1967
"Sault St. Marie"	n/a	1967
"Teacher's Pet"	n/a	1968
"Miss Personality"	n/a	1968
"Little Frisco"	n/a	1970
" Little Curly Hair in a Highchair"	n/a	1970
"Melbourne Airport, Tullamarine"	n/a	1971
"Ballad of Hillbilly Smith"	n/a	1971
"Redbacks Don't Eat Meat"	n/a	1971
"Daddy Frank"	n/a	1971
"Top Forty"	n/a	1971
