= Barry Creyton =

Australian actor and playwright

- Born: 1939 (age 86–87); Brisbane, Queensland, Australia
- Education: Brisbane State High School
- Occupations: Actor; comedian; playwright/dramatist; writer; composer; television screenwriter; director
- Years active: 1957 – present
- Known for: The Mavis Bramston Show (TV series)
- Relatives: William Hoskins (great-grandfather)

Barry Creyton (born 1939) is an Australian actor, playwright, author, screenwriter, composer and director, he has also worked in the United Kingdom and the United States.

He became best known nationally alongside Carol Raye and Gordon Chater, as one of the original stars of the topical satirical revue comedy The Mavis Bramston Show, in which he also worked on as a writer.

== Biography ==
Creyton was born in Brisbane, Queensland and began his professional career in radio and revue in Melbourne, and became well known in Sydney starring in and writing popular comedy-melodramas at the Music Hall Theatre-Restaurant in Neutral Bay.

He gained national prominence in 1964–66, as one of the original stars and writers of the topical comedy revue TV series The Mavis Bramston Show.

Creyton also spent time in the United Kingdom, where he appeared in British comedy television series including Doctor in the House. Following his return to Australia, he appeared in television series such as The Sullivans and Carson's Law.

Creyton has been a theatre performer since 1957, usually appearing alongside fellow performer Noeline Brown; his stage work has included theatrical versions of Don's Party and The Naked Vicar Show. Creyton now works in the United States.

== Family history ==
Creyton's grandparents were both actors and great-grandfather was Shakespearean actor William Hoskins. Hoskins was a leading member of the Samuel Phelps company at Sadler's Wells and tutor to a young Sir Henry Irving, securing Irving's first acting job for him. Hoskins emigrated to Australia in 1856 to take up management of a theatre. The teenage Irving intended to accompany him, but family duties detained him in England where he went on to become the greatest exponent of Shakespeare of 19th Century British theatre. Irving never forgot Hoskins and paid warm tribute in his autobiography.

As actor-manager, Hoskins played in Sydney, Melbourne, New Zealand and America and his performances became legend in their time. He died in New Zealand in 1886 and his obituary stated "as a student and critical reader of Shakespeare, he had certainly no superiors in any part of the world". Of Welsh descent, Creyton's grandfather was born Thomas George Parry in New Zealand and was adopted at birth by Hoskins who later trained him as an actor. Wanting to succeed on his own merits, he changed his name for the stage to Paul Creyton. Creyton left New Zealand for Australia in 1897 and performed in Sydney and Melbourne before establishing his own repertory company in Queensland.

== TV career ==
=== Career in Australia ===
In 1964 Creyton was recruited by Carol Raye to co-star in the topical satire TV series The Mavis Bramston Show; he appeared weekly between 1964 and 1966, and also wrote sketch material and composed music, including the show's theme Togetherness. He also authored two successful plays for Sydney's Music Hall theatre-restaurant—Lady Audley's Secret, in which he also starred, played for a year in Sydney and was produced on two subsequent occasions in Melbourne; How The West Was Lost, a satire on the TV western genre, also ran for a year in Sydney. During this period, he wrote a weekly newspaper column, composed music for the popular Phillip Street Revue and The Downstairs Revue, and recorded two best-selling comedy LPs with Noeline Brown, which are among the first comedy albums ever produced in Australia. He went on to star in his own TV series The Barry Creyton Show, and several dramatic plays for ABC Television.

=== Career in United Kingdom ===
Creyton moved to England for nine years, playing in comedy, dramatic roles and revue in the West End. He appeared in Don's Party directed by Michael Blakemore at the Royal Court, Roger's Lost Stand at the Duke of York's, Ten Years Hard at the Mayfair, the musical Liz, several revues and a national tour of Abelard and Eloise. He also appeared in episodes of TV series, including Take Three Girls, Doctor in Charge, The Expert and Kindly Leave The Curb. He played a leading role in the BBC's radio soap opera Waggoner's Walk, and was a frequent broadcaster for the BBC World Service. He also wrote a farce for the stage, Follow That Husband, which was produced by Ray Cooney.

=== Return to Australia ===
In 1977, Creyton returned to Australia, where he starred in the stage production of the revue The Naked Vicar Show. During the next ten years he worked in TV, the movies and the theatre. He starred in Alan Ayckbourn's Bedroom Farce, Season's Greetings and Absurd Person Singular, Michael Frayn's Noises Off (directed by Michael Blakemore) and in Hugh Whitemore's Pack of Lies, Side By Side By Sondheim, The Owl and the Pussycat, Suddenly at Home, and in 1986 played twins in the comedy-thriller Corpse. He was a lead writer on the award-winning Australian TV series Carson's Law and contributed regular episodes to its long run, at the same time writing comedy material for the daytime variety showThe Mike Walsh Show as well as appearing in some ninety guest spots on this popular TV show.

In 1987, he directed the musical Nunsense which broke box office records all over Australia, and employed two companies playing simultaneously. With the author's permission he revised the dialogue for Australian audiences, an exercise he repeated for Irish audiences in the Dublin production which he directed in June 1988.

During the Perth run of Corpse, a motor-cycle accident resulted in a badly broken leg. The ensuing period of hospitalisation allowed him to write a comedy for the stage, Double Act. He and Noeline Brown starred in the original production which opened in September 1987 to universal critical acclaim and broke all box office records for the Ensemble Theatre. Since then, Double Act has been produced in more than twenty languages. The Paris production starred popular Spanish movie star Carmen Maura and celebrated French star Jean-Pierre Cassel. In Madrid, with Lola Herrera, it ran for over a year. In Canada, starring George Segal, it broke two box office records. The Berlin production, originating at the famous Komodie Theater has been playing somewhere in Germany with major stars for the last sixteen years. A highly successful national tour of England followed London's West End production. In 1996, Garry McDonald and his wife Diane Craig starred in the Perth Theatre Company production which toured regional Australia. The 1998 U.S production featured movie star Keir Dullea and Tony Award winner Bonnie Franklin. Most recently, Double Act was a success in the 2001 season in Rome and toured Italy in 2002. In 2002, a prestigious production won acclaim in Vienna.

In 1988, Creyton was honoured with the Norman Kessel Memorial Award for his contributions to Australian theatre as actor, playwright and director.

=== Career in America ===
Since 1989, he has worked almost exclusively in the United States where he has written movies-of-the-week for TV. He wrote all the sketch material for the off Broadway revue Secrets Every Smart Traveler Should Know which ran for two and a half years in New York.

In January 1996, after a seven-year absence, Creyton returned to Australia to star in the Queensland Theatre Company's production of Noël Coward's Blithe Spirit. Its success encouraged him to return to Sydney to direct and star in his own play Valentine's Day at Marian Street Theatre where it played to capacity. Valentine’s Day is currently playing in Germany (Valentinstag) and in the Netherlands (Valentijnsdag). Australian revivals were produced in 2005 and 2007 and a revival of Double Act (the fifth in Australia) began a national tour in 2006. Two years later, he wrote, directed and starred in the bitter-sweet comedy Later Than Spring, also for Marian Street and to critical acclaim. In 2007 he again co-starred with Noeline Brown in the British play Glorious at the Ensemble, Sydney.

== Publishing ==
His novels, The Dogs of Pompeii and Nero Goes to Rome, co-authored with American writer Vaughan Edwards, are published by Random House.

== Discography ==
=== Albums ===
Title	Album details
The Front Side of Barry Creyton and Noeline Brown (with Noeline Brown)	Released: 1966; Format: LP; Label: Festival Records (FL-31606)
Togetherness	Released: 1966; Format: LP; Label: Festival Records (FL-31824)
The Not So Wet and Dry Side of Barry Creyton and Noeline Brown (with Noeline Brown)	Released: 1969; Format: LP; Label: Festival Records (FL-31663)
