= Jeff Phillips (singer) =

Australian singer (born 1948)

- Phillips in 1968
- Born: Jeffrey Travis Andrew Phillips; November 1948 (age 77–78); Canning River, Western Australia, Australia
- Presenting career
- Previous shows: Club 17, Sounds Like Us, Happening '71, The Rolf Harris Show, Child's Play, Star Search

Jeffrey Travis Andrew Phillips (born November 1948) is an Australian TV show host, personality, musical theatre actor and pop singer active from 1966 to the early 1990s. As a pop singer, he had a Top 40 hit on the Go-Set singles chart with a cover version of The Shirelles' 1961 hit, "Baby It's You". At the Logie Awards of 1970, he won the Best New Talent category for hosting his own ABC TV pop show, Sounds Like Us. In the early 1970s he hosted a series of teen pop music shows, Happening '71 and Happening '72. In July 1972 Phillips won a song prize at the Fifth Olympiad of Song, held in Athens, performing his self-written work, "Gloria"; the prize money was 100,000 drachmae (AUD $2,797). Although he issued further singles, until the early 1980s, he had no other national Top 40 chart success. From July 1985 to October 1987 he appeared in the Australian stage production of Cats in the role of Rum Tum Tugger in both the Sydney run and the Melbourne season; he also performed on the original Australian cast album.

== Biography ==
Phillips at Festival Hall in 1968

Jeffrey Travis Andrew Phillips was born in November 1948 and grew up on the Canning River, Western Australia. His father was a hairdresser. From the age of ten he learned the guitar. For secondary education he started at St. Francis Xavier High School with his final two years at Trinity College, where he played football and also performed at annual concerts. At the age of 12 years he appeared on TVW–7's Thursday Party and the following year on Play a Simple Melody. In 1964 he was spotted by a TVW–7 representative at a Trinity College concert and invited to appear on nightly variety show, In Perth Tonight. In 1966 he took over as compere of Perth TV pop music show, Club 17. At University of Western Australia he commenced an Economics course and formed a band, The Jeff Phillips Scene.

Early in 1968 he relinquished his studies and moved to Melbourne where he signed with Festival Records. During that year he competed on a TV talent quest, New Faces, he appeared on teen pop music show, Uptight, and variety show, In Melbourne Tonight. In November he issued his debut single, which was a cover version of The Shirelles' 1961 hit, "Baby It's You", and had also been covered by The Beatles in 1963. In December 1968 Phillips' version peaked at No. 34 on the Go-Set National Top 40 singles chart. That year the track also appeared on his debut extended play, The Wonderful World of Jeff Phillips. In June 1969 on the Go-Set Pop Poll he was voted fifth on a list of most popular Male Vocal artists. Although he issued further singles, until the early 1980s, he had no other national Top 40 chart success.

From September 1969 Phillips was the host of his own ABC TV pop variety show, Sounds Like Us. The Australian Women's Weekly's Sally White described Phillips as having "charm" and "set for a long and highly tuneful career" with his "elfin chin and clean cut appeal". In 1970 he released a video recording of Sound Like Us with tracks by himself and by his guests, fellow pop singers, Ronnie Burns and Bev Harrell. At the Logie Awards of 1970, sponsored by TV Week, he won the George Wallace Memorial Logie for Best New Talent. In April 1971 he hosted a Saturday morning teen pop music show, Happening '71, for ATV-0 and followed with Happening '72 the next year. In July 1972 Phillips won a song prize at the Fifth Olympiad of Song, held in Athens, performing his self-written work, "Gloria"; the prize was 100,000 drachmae (AUD $2,797). At the TV Week King of Pop Awards of 1972 he won Best Dressed Male. In December that year he was placed fourth on Go-Set's Pop Poll for most popular Male Vocalists.

Following the demise of Happening '72, in 1973, he relocated to the United Kingdom, where he was based for several years. He released a number of singles there including a version of John Paul Young's, "Yesterday's Hero" (1975). During his time in UK he became a regular act at the Speakeasy Club. In 1977 he appeared on BBC TV shows, The Rolf Harris Show for eight episodes and on Seaside Special for three episodes. In the late 1970s he re-located to Los Angeles for a time. He returned to Australia where he briefly hosted the game show Child's Play for the Seven Network in 1984. Then from July 1985 to October 1987 he appeared in the Australian stage production of Cats in the role of Rum Tum Tugger in both the Sydney run alongside Debra Byrne, Marina Prior and Anita Louise Combe; and then the Melbourne season; he also performed on the original Australian cast album. He then went on to club work. Phillips was a regular TVW-7 personality who often performed Cliff Richard material on various Tonight shows. In 1991 he hosted the Ten Network TV talent show, Star Search, where finalists were determined by phone-in votes from viewers. In March 1992 he had a guest role on soap opera Chances; he described his work as having "some steamy scenes and it will attract a bit of interest".

== Discography ==
=== Video albums ===
- Sounds Like Us – (1970, Australian Music Heritage)

=== Extended plays ===
- The Wonderful World of Jeff Phillips – (1968, Festival Records FX-11585)

=== Singles ===
- "Baby It's You" – 1968 (Go-Set No. 34, KMR No. 42, Melbourne No. 21, Brisbane No. 11)
- "What a Wonderful World" – 1969
- "Everything I Touch Turns to Tears" – 1969 (KMR No. 63)
- "Wrong or Right" – 1970 (Festival)
- "I Want to Be Famous Like My Dad" – 1970 (Generation)
- "Movement of Love" – 1971 (Generation)
- "Gloria" – 1972 (Havoc)
- "I'll Never Fall in Love Again" – 1973 (WWA)
- "Shake a Hand" – 1974 (UA)
- "Yesterday's Hero" – 1975
- "Superman (I Want To Make You Love Me)" – 1976 (as Jeff Phillips & Tigerwing)
- "Crying in the Middle of the Night" – 1976
- "Here You Come Again" – 1977 (NEMS)
- "Jojo" – 1978 (RCA Victor UK)
- "Let Your Love Go" – 1977
- "Rock Me Slowly" – 1978 (RCA UK)
- "Somebody's Stolen My Thunder" – (NEMS)
- "L.A. Reggae" – 1981 (Astor)
- "Desire" – 1981 (RCA)

== Awards and nominations ==
=== Go-Set Pop Poll ===
The Go-Set Pop Poll was coordinated by teen-oriented pop music newspaper, Go-Set and was established in February 1966 and conducted an annual poll during 1966 to 1972 of its readers to determine the most popular personalities.

Year	Nominee / work	Award	Result
1969	himself	Male Vocal	5th
1972	himself	Male Artist	4th

=== King of Pop Awards ===
The King of Pop Awards were voted by the readers of TV Week. The King of Pop award started in 1967 and ran through to 1978.

Year	Nominee / work	Award	Result
1972	himself	Best Dressed Male	Won

=== Logie Awards ===
The Logie Awards is an annual gathering to celebrate Australian television, sponsored and organised by magazine TV Week, with the first ceremony in 1959, known then as the TV Week Awards, the awards are presented in 20 categories representing both public and industry voted awards.

Year	Nominee / work	Award	Result
Logie Awards of 1970	himself	George Wallace Memorial Logie for Best New Talent	Won
