= Judy Banks =

Australian television presenter (1935–2022)

- Born: 19 June 1935; Melbourne, Victoria, Australia
- Died: 22 January 2022 (aged 86); Australia
- Occupations: Actress, TV presenter

Judy Banks (19 June 1935 – 22 January 2022) was an Australian television presenter and actress of stage and screen, singer and pioneering children's TV host. She started her career in musical theatre from the early 1950s and was an early star on Melbourne television.

== Life and career ==
Banks was born in Melbourne, Victoria. She started her career as a stage actress, playing the juvenile leads in many musicals in the early 1950s, including Salad Days, Lock Up Your Daughters and Free As Air. She moved to television with guest roles in In Melbourne Tonight, Saturday Party, Personally Yours, Be My Guest and Musical Cash Box before hosting her own series, Four for the Show, for four years. She was the co-director of TV World, the Australian Museum of Modern Media, alongside her husband.

Banks was best known as co-presenter of the children's variety program Fredd Bear's Breakfast-A-Go-Go (1969-71) and, later, an afternoon show called Fredd Bear's Super Cartoon Show in 1972. She briefly worked as a presentation announcer for radio. She also had guest starring acting roles in many series, including Homicide, The Flying Doctors and City Homicide. She ran her own talent and media school and also presented a radio program called Sugar and Spice.

== Family ==
Banks was married to TV producer Bob Phillips and was the mother of Australian international relations academic Andrew Phillips.

== Filmography ==
Title	Year	Role
Peters Club (TV series)	1958	Self
Saturday Party	1959	Self
Don't Argue (TV series)	1959	Self
Two's Company (TV series)	1959	Self
Be My Guest	1961	Self
Personally Yours (TV series)	1962	Self (The Judy Banks Show)
Four for the Show (TV series)	1963	
Australian Playhouse	1967	Theatre role
In Melbourne Tonight	1969	Self (3 episodes)
Musical Cashbox	1969	Billed as herself
Fredd Bear's Breakfast-A-Go-Go	1969-1971	Hostess/presenter
Homicide (TV series)	1973	Girlfriend
The Flying Doctors	1991	Margaret MacMahon
Dallkeith	2001	Doris
Dreams for Life	2004	June
Brigit and Benny: A Modern Faerietale (TV series)	2005	Grandmother
City Homicide	2007	Doris Croker

== Discography ==
=== Single ===
- "Freddie" / "Live for Tomorrow" - Tempo - TS107 - 1970

=== EP ===
- My Favourite Songs from Salad Days - Planet PZ 030 - 1958

=== Album ===
- A Paw Full of Songs - Tempo. TST 704
