= Logie Awards of 1970 =

12th Logie Awards
- Date: 20 March 1970
- Site: Southern Cross Hotel, Melbourne, Victoria
- Hosted by: Bert Newton
- Gold Logie: Barry Crocker

Television coverage
- Network: Nine Network

The 12th Annual TV Week Logie Awards were presented on Friday 20 March 1970 at Southern Cross Hotel in Melbourne and broadcast on the Nine Network. Bert Newton from the Nine Network was the Master of Ceremonies. Miss World 1968 winner Penelope Plummer, British television actor Peter Wyngarde and American actors Peter Graves and Robert Young appeared as guests. Peggy Lipton, star of the US series The Mod Squad, was also originally scheduled to appear but cancelled at the last minute due to a severe middle-ear infection. This article lists the winners of Logie Awards (Australian television) for 1970:

== Awards ==
=== Gold Logie ===
Awards presented by Robert Young

Most Popular Male Personality on Australian Television
Winner: Barry Crocker, Sound of Music, Nine Network

Most Popular Female Personality on Australian Television
Winner: Maggie Tabberer, Maggie, Seven Network

=== Special Gold Logie ===
Special Gold Logie For Providing TV's Greatest Moment in Their Moon Telecast
Winner: Neil Armstrong and Buzz Aldrin

=== Logie ===
==== National ====
Best Australian Drama Series
Winner: Division 4, Nine Network

Best Teenage Personality
Winner: Johnny Farnham

Best Australian Musical/Variety Show
Winner: Sound of Music, Nine Network

Best Australian Documentary
Winner: Chequerboard, ABC

Best Overseas Show
Winner: The Mod Squad

Best Australian Commercial
Winner: Coca-Cola

For Pioneering Australia's First World Championship Boxing Telecast
Winner: Reg Ansett

Outstanding Contribution To Australian Television
Winner: Hector Crawford

Best Children's Show
Winner: Here's Humphrey, Nine Network

Outstanding Work As Compere
Winner: Bert Newton, In Melbourne Tonight, Nine Network

Outstanding Documentary
Winner: Dig a Million, Make a Million, ABC

Best News Reporting
Winner: Steve Raymond, for stories on Marianne Faithfull and a mass teenage funeral at Warren in NSW, Network Ten

==== Victoria ====
Best Male Personality
Winner: Mike Preston

Best Female Personality
Winner: Rosemary Margan

Best Local Show
Winner: In Melbourne Tonight, Nine Network

==== New South Wales ====
Best Male Personality
Winner: Don Lane

Best Female Personality
Winner: Rosemary Eather

Best Local Show
Winner: Tonight Show With Don Lane, Nine Network

==== South Australia ====
Best Male Personality
Winner: Ernie Sigley

Best Female Personality
Winner: Anne Wills

Best Local Show
Winner: Adelaide Tonight, Nine Network

==== Queensland ====
Best Male Personality
Winner: Ron Cadee

Best Female Personality
Winner: Joy Chambers

Best Local Show
Winner: Dick McCann Show, Network Ten

==== Tasmania ====
Best Male Personality
Winner: Lindsay Edwards

Best Female Personality
Winner: Caroline Schmit

Best Local Show
Winner: :It's Just For Us

==== Western Australia ====
Best Male Personality
Winner: Garry Meadows

Best Female Personality
Winner: Trina Brown

Best Local Show
Winner: Today Tonight, ABC

=== Special Achievement Award ===
George Wallace Memorial Logie For Best New Talent
Winner: Jeff Phillips
