= Sam's Luck =

- Genre: Children's drama
- Written by: Noel Robinson
- Directed by: David Zweck
- Starring: David Clencie; Dena McAbee; Paul Colombani
- Country of origin: Australia
- Original language: English
- No. of seasons: 1
- No. of episodes: 6

Production
- Producer: Keith Wilkes
- Cinematography: Kevin Bartlett
- Editor: Ted Lowe
- Running time: 30 minutes
- Production company: ABC

Original release
- Network: ABC TV
- Release: 7 July – 11 August 1980

Sam's Luck is an Australian children's drama television series that originally aired on ABC TV for one season from 7 July until 11 August 1980. It was a six episode series about three children, Sam, Janny and Daniel, who try to look after themselves while their mother goes to Singapore. They were meant to have been picked up by their Aunt June but instead take over the running of their own house.

== Cast ==
- David Clencie as Sam Parkes
- Dena McAbee as Janny Parkes
- Paul Colombani as Daniel Parkes
- Sue Jones as Lindy Parkes
- Marion Edward as Aunty June
- Ernie Bourne as Benno
- Michael Carman as Dave Bristow
- Ursula Olejnik as Christine
- Lloyd Cunnington as Mr. Kaminski
- Colin McEwan as Uncle Harry

== Reception ==
Rita Erlich of The Age commented on the first episode and said "Noel Robinson's script had a few rough patches, but showed beautifully how children model their behavior on that of their parents."

Looking back at the series Jill Morris of The Age said that the cast had to "struggle against a poor script and a host of stereotypes".
