= The Hawking Brothers =

- Back: Russ Hawking, Alan Hawking; Front: Peter Cohen, George Xanthos, Gary Newton

Background information
- Also known as: The Hawking Brothers & the Wildwoods
- Origin: Brunswick, Victoria, Australia
- Genres: Country music
- Years active: 1955–1981
- Labels: Regal Zonophone; W&G; Fable; Parlophone; EMI; RCA
- Past members: Alan Hawking; Russell Hawking; Joe Attard; Gary Newton; George Xanthos; Peter Cohen; Peter Hayes; John Faubel; Leo Dalton; Doug Foley; Charles Boland

The Hawking Brothers were an Australian country music band, formed in 1955 and disbanded in 1985. They initially started as a duo by the brothers Russell (1931–1976) and Alan (1933–1988). For the five-piece version, the Hawking Brothers & the Wildwoods, they were joined by Joe Attard, Gary Newton, and George Xanthos. Later they reverted to the Hawking Brothers with other members including Peter Hayes and Doug Foley. The group reached the top 40 on the Kent Music Report singles chart with "Catfish John" (1973) and "One Day at a Time" (1978). They played at the Grand Ole Opry in 1975. The Hawking Brothers have won eight Golden Guitar trophies at the Country Music Awards of Australia. In 1989 the Hawking Brothers were inducted into the Australian Roll of Renown.

== History ==
Alan (7 July 1933–19 September 1988) and his older brother, Russell John Hawking (1 July 1931–2 November 1976), were both born in Mooroopna in northern Victoria. After their mother, Ethel May Hawking (c. 1912–1935), died they were raised separately: Alan in Clifton Hill, Victoria by their maternal grandparents; Russell in Mooroopna by their paternal grandparents. During the late 1940s Alan and Russell attended the Hillbilly Club in Brunswick for basic instruction in country music. The Hawking Brothers performed as a "hillbilly duo" and competed for an Amateur Hour prize of £1000 in October 1952 and finished third. The brothers also joined the Trailblazers, a country music troupe, which performed on radio and toured Victoria in the 1950s. They were recorded on the album, The Trailblazers Stage Show (1958) for Planet Records.

The Hawking Brothers, with Alan on lead guitar and vocals and Russell on rhythm guitar and vocals, issued a single, "My Darling Daisy", on Regal Zonophone Records, in June 1955. In the following year Alan married Diane and the couple later had four children. Another single, "Please, Baby, Please", which was co-written by Alan and Russell, appeared in November 1960 via Columbia Records. Ainslie Baker of The Australian Women's Weekly felt it was, "catchy, and shows plenty of promise for the future." When not performing Alan worked as a cabinetmaker and then as a luthier at Maton, Russell was a public servant. The duo backed the country music singer Kevin Shegog and were recorded on the albums, Country Concert (split album, 1961) and Kevin Shegog (solo album, 1962), both on W&G Records. In April 1962 the Hawking Brothers released another single, "Two Timin' Baby".

In November 1967 they issued their debut stand-alone album, Portrait of the Folksy, via W&G Records. The Wildwoods were the backing musicians for an album, The Hawking Brothers and The Wildwoods (1970), which was issued by Parlophone/EMI Music Australia. The line-up was Alan on guitar, banjo, autoharp and vocals; and Russ on rhythm guitar, dobro, and vocals as the Hawking Brothers; while the Wildwoods were Joe Attard on drums; Gary Newton on acoustic and electric bass guitars; and George Xanthos on pedal steel guitar. It was recorded at Armstrong Studios with Roger Savage and John Sayers as audio engineers. Eventually they became the five-piece version of the Hawking Brothers Band. The group signed with Fable Records to release the album, Australian Heritage (1970). They had quit their daytime jobs and became fully professional.

In 1973 the Hawking Brothers backed Johnny Cash on his Australian tour. They released a cover version of "Catfish John" in that year, originally by United States country singer-songwriter, Bob McDill. Their rendition reached the top 40 on the Kent Music Report singles chart. It appeared on the group's compilation album for Fable Records, Country Gold (1973). The line-up was Alan on vocal, spanish guitar, tenor guitar, banjo, and auto harp; Russ on vocal, rhythm guitar and Dobro guitar; Newton on bass guitar; Xanthos on pedal steel guitar; and Peter Cohen on drums.

Russell died in 1976 after a heart attack. Alan continued the group, in homage to his brother, with Peter Hayes joining on guitar and vocals. Their cover version of Marilyn Sellars' 1974 single, "One Day at a Time", reached the No. 30 in 1978. By 1980 Alan and Xanthos had been joined by Leo Dalton, John Faubles and Doug Foley. Due to "personal reasons" Alan retired from the group in 1981 and undertook a solo career. Alan died in 1988 due to "complications set in after a gall-bladder operation."

== Discography ==
=== Studio albums ===
List of albums, with selected chart positions
Title	Album details	Peak chart positions
Title	Album details	AUS
Country Concert (Kevin Shegog and the Hawking Brothers)	Released: 1961; Format: LP; Label: W&G Records (WG-25/5109)	-
Portrait of the Folksy a.k.a. The Hawking Brothers Sing Old Golden Songs	Released: November 1967; Format: LP; Label: W&G (WG-25/5174)	-
Australian Heritage	Released: 1970; Format: LP; Label: Fable Records (FBSA-006)	-
Australian Heritage, Vol. 2	Released: 1975; Format: LP; Label: Fable (FBSA-048)	-
The Hawking Brothers in Nashville	Released: 1976; Format: LP; Label: Fable (FBSA-051)	-
Country Travellin'	Released: 1977; Format: LP; Label: RCA Victor (VPL1 0155)	-
One Day at a Time	Released: December 1978; Format: LP; Label: RCA Victor (VPL1 0188)	56
Songs & Poems of Australia (with Ken Sparkes & Terry McDermott)	Released: 1979; Format: LP; Label: RCA Victor (VPL1 0250)	-
The Hawks	Released: 1979; Format: LP; Label: RCA Victor (VPL1 0250)	-

=== Live albums ===
Title	Album details
Flying High (Live in Concert)	Released: 1980; Format: LP, Cassette; Label: RCA Victor (VPL1-0294)

=== Compilations ===
Title	Album details
Country Gold	Released: 1972; Format: LP; Label: Fable Records (FBSA 032)
The Best of the Hawking Brothers	Released: 1974; Format: LP; Label: Fable (FBSA 5301)
The Hawking Brothers: Special Edition	Released: 1976; Format: LP; Label: Crest International (CRIN-TV 119)
Twenty-One Years with the Hawking Brothers	Released: 1977; Format: LP; Label: Fable (FBSA-065)
The Hawking Brothers Collection	Released: 1984; Format: LP, Cass; Label: EMI (MID 166072)

=== Charting singles ===
List of singles, with Australian chart positions
Year	Title	Peak chart positions
Year	Title	AUS
1973	"Catfish John"	32
1973	"The Melbourne Cup"	83
1978	"One Day at a Time"	30

==== Other singles ====
List of singles as featured artist, with selected chart positions
Title	Year	Peak chart positions
Title	Year	AUS
"The Garden" (as Australia Too)	1985	22

== Awards ==
=== Country Music Awards (CMAA) ===
The Australasian Country Music Awards were established as an annual ceremony on the Australia Day long-weekend in Tamworth since January 1973. The Hawking Brothers have won eight Golden Guitar trophies, while Alan Hawking won an additional three for his solo work. The group were inducted into the Roll of Renown at the 1989 ceremony. In 1992 the awards were rebranded as the Country Music Awards of Australia when they were presented by the Country Music Association of Australia (CMAA).

Year	Nominee / work	Award	Result
1974	The Hawking Brothers – "Yakity Axe"	Instrumental of the Year	Won
1974	The Hawking Brothers – "Catfish John"	Vocal Group or Duo of the Year	Won
1975	The Hawking Brothers – "Juliana"	Vocal Group or Duo of the Year	Won
1977	The Hawking Brothers – "This House Runs on Sunshine"	Vocal Group or Duo of the Year	Won
1978	The Hawking Brothers – Country Travellin'	Album of the Year	Won
1978	The Hawking Brothers – "Silver Wings"	Vocal Group or Duo of the Year	Won
1979	The Hawking Brothers – One Day at a Time	Top Selling Album	Won
1979	The Hawking Brothers – One Day at a Time	Album of the Year	Won
1983	Alan Hawking – "Back to Those Rolling Plains "	Instrumental of the Year	Won
1985	Alan Hawking – "Gospel Train"	Instrumental of the Year	Won
1988	Alan Hawking – "The Old Time Tent Shows" (Barry Forrester)	APRA Song of the Year	Won
1989	Themselves	Roll of Renown	inducted

- Note: Wins only

== See also ==
- Smoky Dawson
- Slim Dusty
- Chad Morgan
