= Henri Bource =

Australian shark attack survivor (1934–1998)

- Born: 25 March 1934
- Died: 4 September 1998 (aged 64); Melbourne, Victoria, Australia
- Occupations: Scuba diver, filmmaker, musician
- Known for: Survivor of a shark attack
- Notable work: Savage Shadows

Henri Bource (25 March 1934 – 4 September 1998) was an Australian scuba diver, underwater filmmaker, musician and shark attack survivor. In 1964, he was attacked by a great white shark, losing his left leg. In his 1969 documentary film Savage Shadows, he recreated the scene of the attack.

== Early life ==
Bource was born in the Netherlands and emigrated to Australia as a teenager in 1954. He learned to use an aqualung with his father and trained as a graphic artist.

== Shark attack ==
Bource was attacked by what is believed to have been a 2.4 metre long great white shark off Lady Julia Percy Island in Australia in November 1964. He was 30 years old at the time, and was living in Hawthorn East. He lost his left leg but survived the attack and went on to retell the story in his 1969 documentary film, Savage Shadows. He continued to dive, wearing a modified diving fin on the stump of his left leg. During the 1970s he made a short film for BHP and Esso called Reef of Steel and appeared in Island Treasure in 1981. He was interviewed at various times about his shark attack, including by Peter Luck in 1979.

== Music career ==
Bource was a saxophonist and band leader of the Henri Bource Allstars who recorded for the Australian Planet record label. He also played with the Thunderbirds (1960–62), The Planets and The Johnny Donohue Quartet.
