= Adventure Island (TV series) =

1967–1972 Australian children's TV series

- Genre: Children's television
- Created by: Godfrey Philipp; John-Michael Howson
- Presented by: Nancy Cato; Sue Donovan
- Country of origin: Australia
- Original language: English
- No. of seasons: 7
- No. of episodes: 1,175

Production
- Running time: 30 minutes

Original release
- Network: ABC Television
- Release: 11 September 1967 – 22 December 1972

Adventure Island is an Australian television series for children which screened on the ABC from 11 September 1967 to 22 December 1972 (repeats of the 1969 to 1972 episodes ran from 1973 to 1976). It was jointly created by Godfrey Philipp, who produced the series, and actor-writer John-Michael Howson, who also co-starred in the show. It typically aired from Monday to Friday and each story would stretch across a full week, reaching a resolution on Friday.

Adventure Island was a joint production of Godfrey Philipp Productions and the Australian Broadcasting Commission, pre-recorded on videotape at the ABC's studios in Ripponlea, Melbourne. It is believed to be the first program made by the ABC in collaboration with an outside production company. Production was usually five weeks ahead of broadcast. It was a pantomime-style series set in the kingdom of Diddley-Dum-Diddley. The show was hosted by Nancy Cato (a cousin of the noted author of the same name) from 1967 to 1968 (her final pre-recorded episodes aired at the beginning of 1969) and Sue Donovan from 1969 to 1972.

== Cast ==
=== Regular ===
- Nancy Cato (Actress) as Host (1967–68)
- Sue Donovan as Host (1968–72)
- Liz Harris as Liza / Princess
- John-Michael Howson as Clown / Golden Harp
- Brian Crossley as Mrs Flower Potts & Gracie Galah
- Jack Manuel as Percy Panda
- Carole Walker as Betty Bruin
- Ernie Bourne as Fester Fumble, Crispian Cockatoo, Captain Crook, Samson (cat), Maxie Mouse & Mister House / Serendipity House
- Jack Manuel as Mister House / Serendipity House
- Colin McEwan as Miser Meanie & Gussie Galah
- Robert Essex
- Peter Homewood as Giggles Goblin
- Burt Cooper as Squire Squeezum

=== Guests ===
- Angela O'Toole
- Brian Hannan
- Frank Rich
- James Smillie as Smiling Jim / Prince Charming (1 episode)
- Lindsay Edwards
- Marion Edward as Dodo Panda & Matilda Mouse (2 episodes)
- Mary Hardy
- Patsy King as Miss Behaviour
- Vivean Gray as Mother Sparkle / Mother Tinkle
- Wynn Roberts as Captain James Cook (2 episodes)

== Pre-production ==
Following the May 1967 announcement of the imminent axing of the highly popular Independent Television System children's programme The Magic Circle Club, made in Melbourne at the ATV0 studios in Nunawading, the ABC immediately approached its producers with a proposal to immediately take over production of the show. This was very quickly thwarted when the 0-10 Network's then owner Reg Ansett refused to relinquish his network's rights to the show's name and premise, forcing Philipp and Howson to devise a lookalike.

Adventure Island's creation was credited to both Philipp and Howson, although Liz Harris recalls Howson verbalising the show's entire premise and setting, as well as naming all the characters, during a short promotional aeroplane flight in mid-1967.

== Writing ==
Whereas on The Magic Circle Club Howson shared scriptwriting duties fairly equally with Peter Homewood and Max Bartlett, for Adventure Island Howson wrote most of the scripts, with others contributed by Peter Homewood. Howson also wrote four illustrated storybooks based on the show which were given a single limited print run. They quickly sold out and are now extremely rare, though copies are available in the National Library of Australia.

== 1967–68 ==
Nancy Cato was Adventure Island's first host during 1967–68. Cato had been forced to leave The Magic Circle Club dramatically in 1966 after an on-set accident, and she joined Adventure Island after her recovery.

Each show would begin with Cato in an enchanted wood (one of the show's few direct similarities with The Magic Circle Club). In early episodes, Nancy would sit down behind a tree-stump lectern on which was poised a magic book, open the book and begin to read the story. The story would be based on a place called Adventure Island and the residents of its town of Diddley-Dum-Diddley, and viewers would see the story played out by the characters themselves.

In later episodes, Nancy would begin the show by bantering with puppets Gussie Galah, Crispian Cockatoo and Matilda Mouse, then read from the book. At the conclusion of each chapter, Nancy would talk to a cat puppet, which was named Samson in a viewer competition early in the show's run.

== 1969–72 ==
Sue Donovan took over the hosting role in 1969 after Cato's unexpected departure. The show's basic structure remained, but each episode instead began with a conversation with a talking house (Mister House, later named Serendipity House in a viewer competition) voiced by Jack Manuel and sometimes Ernie Bourne). Sue would then walk into the house where she would ad-lib with Crispian Cockatoo and Gracie Galah on Mondays, Wednesdays and Fridays, and with Maxie Mouse (Ernie Bourne) and a vertical waveform called Chi on Tuesdays and Thursdays. A chime would sound to indicate it was time for Sue to read the book.

Each show would close with Sue talking to Samson the cat, but on Fridays she would click her fingers and magically transport herself to Diddley-Dum-Diddley for a sit-down chat and a cup of tea with all the characters.

== Premise ==
The show was highly moralistic with a strong "good over evil" motif in every story.

The scripted part of the show—a story serialised over five days, Monday to Friday—usually involved the inhabitants of Diddley-Dum-Diddley being set upon or tricked in some way by one or more of the "baddies". On many occasions the usually dimwitted Clown (with sawdust for a brain and an appalling memory) would save the day with his uncanny ability to see through disguises, a skill not possessed by the other residents of the town.

Some weeks' episodes would include no baddies at all, but instead centre around a visitor to Diddley-Dum-Diddley, often a relative of one of the characters, or a business-person or entrepreneur of some sort.

Concerned that some children may become upset by the mischief created by the baddies or the dilemmas faced by the Diddley-Dum-Diddleys, it was common at times of high drama for a cast member to remind the young audience that "it always turns out all right on Fridays".

The show was rooted in very traditional camp and pantomime traditions, and utilised a genre of light entertainment and humour appreciated by children for its simplicity and by adults for its escapism and sly nods.

== Music ==
In true 'panto' style, music was an essential element of Adventure Island. Nearly every moment was accompanied by instrumental improvisation. Each episode contained two original songs relevant to the show's plot. The lyrics for these were typically written by the week's scriptwriter (either Howson or Homewood) and set to music by musical director Bruce Rowland. After Rowland departed the show in 1971 many of the songs he had written were reused in later episodes. Rowland found great fame and respect during the 1970s and 1980s in the field of movie soundtracks. His replacement was Alan Teak.

The songs were almost always pre-recorded on Thursdays, then pressed to acetate and given to the actors to take home and learn so they could be accurately lip-synched during taping. A notable exception to the pre-recording rule was John Michael Howson's outstanding and moving live-to-camera performance of A Clown Without A Smile in episode 1174 (one of only a handful of episodes that have survived).

== Puppets ==
In each episode's unscripted segments, the hostess would converse with puppet characters. It was at these points in the show that viewer contributions (drawings, riddles, jokes, etc.) would be aired.

The puppets which appeared on Adventure Island were:

- Gussie Galah, operated by Colin McEwan (1967–68)
- Crispian Cockatoo, operated by Ernie Bourne (1967–72)
- Matilda Mouse, operated by Marion Edward (1967–68)
- Samson (cat), operated by Ernie Bourne (1967–72)
- Gracie Galah, operated by Brian Crossley (1969–72)
- Maxie Mouse, operated by Ernie Bourne (1969–72)

A female version of Samson, operated by Liz Harris, appeared for several weeks in 1971 when Ernie Bourne was forced to take a break for health reasons.

Samson was a large hand puppet, similar to a muppet. All the other puppets were mechanical creations. The operator would pull down on a rod, either underneath or inside the body of the puppet, to open the mouth or beak. The show's puppets were constructed by Axel Axelrad, who was typically named in the credits simply as "Axel".

== Magic ==
As in The Magic Circle Club all of the characters in Adventure Island, including the hostesses, possessed magic powers which they could call upon if the need arose. These were used sparingly, most likely because of technical difficulties in performing videotape drop-edits with the cumbersome videotape technology of the day.

Each Friday episode generally concluded with the hostess visiting Adventure Island and sitting with the characters to discuss the week's adventure. She would transport herself there by clicking her fingers.

Samson (the pussycat) was actually a magic cat who would be invisible until Monday afternoon's episode. To make him appear, the hostess would need to answer a question he would ask from "beyond". He would disappear again on Friday afternoons by sneezing.

== Colour ==
No episodes of Adventure Island were produced in colour, since Australian TV was at that time broadcast in black-and-white, and there was evidently no plan to sell the program overseas. A popular belief by many viewers that the show was in colour could be attributed in large part to the brilliant sets which, for most of the show's run, were designed by Paul Cleveland.

Howson has said that in 1971 an American network expressed strong interest in the show and were only reluctant to make an offer due to its monochrome format. Howson proposed a solution to the ABC in which the entire five shows would be restaged on Tuesdays but this time filmed in colour—the cast and crew now totally familiar with the scripts, having performed them for the videotaped version on Sunday and Monday—but his proposal was met with total uninterest by the ABC and was never considered.

A brief piece of colour footage (actually an offcut from a 1972 ABC magazine show story on the show's closure) was aired for the first time in 1996 as part of an ABC 40th anniversary programme.

== Awards ==
| Year | Award | Category | Nominee(s) | Result | Ref. |
|---|---|---|---|---|---|
| 1969 | Logie Awards | Best Children's Show | Adventure Island | Won | |
| 1971 | Logie Awards | Most Popular Female (Victoria) | Sue Donovan | Won | |
| 1973 | Logie Awards | Contribution To Children's TV | Godfrey Philipp | Won | |

== Cancellation ==
The show's axing, announced in mid-1972, was highly controversial—not least because it was replaced by the American program Sesame Street—and an unprecedented flood of public protest ensued. A group of MPs headed by David Kennedy launched a "Save Adventure Island" campaign during which questions were asked in Parliament. However the campaign was unsuccessful and the final episode, number 1175, aired on 22 December 1972.

== In popular culture ==
The costume for Percy Panda was used in a semi-regular segment on the ABC comedy The Late Show titled Shirty, the slightly aggressive bear, a send-up of children's television, in which the Shirty character would commit various violent atrocities. In the final Shirty segment, it was revealed that the occupant of the bear suit was Russell Crowe as his character from Romper Stomper.

In the first episode of The Micallef Program, host Shaun Micallef introduces the supporting cast as being recycled from old ABC television programs, stating that viewers may recognise cast member Roz Hammond as "the horribly mutilated corpse from the final episode of Adventure Island. I think Clown is revealed as the psychopath in that one."

== Archival remnants ==
Many of the early episodes of Adventure Island appear to no longer exist. However, a search of the National Archives of Australia reveals 998 listings of audiovisual archival material for the program, most of which appears to be complete episodes stored as black and white film recordings. Although quite a few were wiped there are at least 955 episodes that do exist. Most of which are later episodes.

The National Film & Sound Archive database contains listings for six episodes, preserved on 16mm film and in video copies—one from 1967, one from 1971, and four consecutive episodes (1171–1174) from 1972, which are among the last to have been produced.

The fate of Adventure Island is consistent with that of many other ABC-TV programs from the same period. In the late 1970s ABC-TV management instituted a policy of "recycling" videotape as a cost-cutting measure and this was especially targeted at older programs made in B&W. All departments of ABC-TV were obliged to surrender tapes and as a result a large amount of historically significant videotaped programming from the 1960s and early 1970s was erased.

However, the closure of the Gore Hill studios in Sydney in 2002–03 uncovered large amounts of uncatalogued film and video footage, including many hours of live performance footage from GTK and material other programs long thought to have been lost, including 'missing' portions of The Aunty Jack Show and it is therefore possible that more material from Adventure Island may have survived.

The Performing Arts Collection at the Arts Centre Melbourne, holds a substantial number of costumes, props, photographs and related documents for the production, with the National Film and Sound Archive in Canberra also holding a substantial collection of production documentation and photographs relating to the show.

The Adventure Island storybook, from which Cato and Donovan read each day, is now part of the collection of Powerhouse Museum, Sydney. The donor, who was working at the ABC's Rippon Lea studios as a props staffer at the time, rescued the book from a dumpster where it had been discarded in 1988.

== In Memoriam ==
Several cast members of Adventure Island have died in recent years.

- Colin McEwan – 22 August 2005 (64)
- Marion Edward
- Peter Homewood – 22 December 2008 (79, one day short of his 80th birthday)
- Ernie Bourne – 21 January 2009 (82)
- Brian Crossley – 8 September 2012 (85)

On 22 January 2009, the day after Ernie Bourne's death, the following notice appeared in Melbourne's Herald Sun newspaper:

BOURNE, Ernie – A dear, lovable and funny man who brightened the lives of children around Australia and his fellow Cast Members in the Magic Circle Club and Adventure Island. Goodbye Sir Jasper, farewell Fester Fumble and Samson.
- Flower, Clown, Percy, Betty, Lisa, Sue, Miser, Hep Cat, Marlena, Fredd and Feefee, Godfrey, Bruce and the Boys in the Band.
