= Home (Australian TV series) =

- Title card from Episode 4
- Created by: Graeme Farmer
- Starring: Robert Meldrum; Bill Garner; Christine Amor
- Country of origin: Australia
- No. of episodes: 32

Production
- Executive producer: Noel Price
- Running time: 25 minutes

Original release
- Network: ABC
- Release: 11 April – 24 May 1983

Home is an Australian children's television series first broadcast on the ABC on 11 April 1983. It follows the stories and adventures of children living at the fictional Westmere children's home. The series featured a revolving cast with story arcs running across two to six episodes, although some characters appeared in more than one story arc.

== Cast ==
=== Main / recurring ===
- Robert Meldrum as Dave Mander (18 episodes)
- Darren Sole as Paul Freeman (14 episodes)
- Leah Steventon as Wendy Freeman (11 episodes)

=== Recurring ===
- Allan Chaplin as Nick (4 episodes)
- Ben Michael as Charlie (5 episodes)
- Bill Garner as Frank (5 episodes)
- Christine Amor as Christine (6 episodes)
- Cindy Unkauf as Cass (9 episodes)
- Cliff Ellen as Arnold (6 episodes)
- Con Mathios as Jason Parker (4 episodes)
- Eva Parkin as Rat (4 episodes)
- Fiona Spence as Carol Davidson (4 episodes)
- Frances Lefroy as Tracey Callingham (4 episodes)
- Greg Apps as Jack (3 episodes)
- Ian Turnnidge as Ray (5 episodes)
- Jason Donovan as Ian (3 episodes)
- Johnny Quinn as Gerry Grant (6 episodes)
- Julien Lodge as Steve Crawford (3 episodes)
- Kaarin Fairfax (3 episodes)
- Kurt Schneider as Alf (3 episodes)
- Libbi Gorr as Zed (4 episodes)
- Linda Hartley as Pauline (6 episodes)
- Lisa Potasz as Emina Hassan (4 episodes)
- May Howlett as Irene (3 episodes)
- Tim Blake as Marc (3 episodes)
- Paul Spanno as Oscar (7 episodes)
- Peter Crossley as Peter (3 episodes)
- Peter Dunn as Doug (4 episodes)
- Robert Bennett as Alan (4 episodes)
- Robyn Gibbes as Marion (4 episodes)
- Ross O'Donovan as Tim Weston (3 episodes)
- Sally Ann Creswick as Patricia 'Sac' Forbes (4 episodes)
- Sue Ingleton as Anne (3 episodes)
- Tim Robertson as Tom (3 episodes)
- Vikki Blanche as Billie Jones (4 episodes)

=== Guests ===
- Alton Harvey as Head (2 episodes)
- Brett Lewis as Alex
- Catherine Wilkin as Maggie Harrison (2 episodes)
- Damien McIntyre as Ken
- David Clencie as Mike (2 episodes)
- Denzil Howson as Vet
- Doug Bowles as Muscles (1 episode)
- Gary Day as Denny Harrison (2 episodes)
- Jacqui Lipton as Jan
- Jane Clifton as Kearns (2 episodes)
- Janet Andrewartha as Bellamy (1 episode)
- Janine Luttick as Kirsty
- Jodie Yemm as Joan (2 episodes)
- Joseph Spano as Phil (1 episode)
- Julie Nihill as Joy (2 episodes)
- Lisa Aldenhoven as Nurse (2 episodes)
- Max Gillies as Barney (2 episodes)
- Reg Gorman as Maguire (2 episodes)
- Robert Palmer as Dave (2 episodes)
- Ron Pinnell as Fisherman (1 episode)
- Ruth Darling as Renata (1 episode)
- Shane Lipton as Sam (1 episode)
- Simon Austin as Danny McLuhan (2 episodes)
- Stefan Dennis as Paul (2 episodes)
- Stef Torok as Mark (2 episodes)
- Steve Bastoni as Colin (2 episodes)
- Sue Jones as Gaye Freeman (2 episodes)
- Vanessa Windsor as Cal (2 episodes)

== Production ==
Home was written by Graeme Farmer and directed by Richard Sarell, Walter Boston, Noel Price and Douglas Sharp. It was the biggest production to come from the network's children's unit at the time, and featured more than 400 young actors in the cast. The series is set in a community of welfare cottages and centres on the children who come to live there.

== Broadcast ==
The series premiered on ABC on 11 April 1983 and ran Monday to Friday in a 6:00 pm timeslot. The last episode aired on 24 May 1983.

In the United Kingdom, the series was screened on ITV in the Children's ITV segment. Weekly broadcasts began on 21 April 1983, just over a week after the series debuted in Australia, and concluded on 24 November 1983. It was repeated in 1984 and 1985 in some regions of the UK. It was also screened in a number of European countries.

== Reception ==
Jacqueline Lee Lewis of The Sun-Herald praised the series, calling it "wonderful". She wrote "The concept is an interesting one, it's believable (thank goodness, after all those soapies) and it's well acted." Lewis said that with such a large cast it was hard to name everyone who deserved "a gold medal" for their performances, but mentioned Lea Steventon, Darren Sole, Paul Spano, Lisa Potasz, Ian Turnnidge and Cindy Unkauf. She also praised the older actors Bill Garner, Christine Amor and Robert Meldrum. Brian Courtis from The Age called Home a "realistic, well-scripted ABC drama".
