= The Rise and Fall of Wellington Boots =

- Genre: Comedy
- Country of origin: Australia
- Original language: English
- No. of seasons: 1
- No. of episodes: 6

Production
- Running time: 30 minutes

Original release
- Network: ABC
- Release: 1975

The Rise and Fall of Wellington Boots is an Australian television sitcom, consisting of six 30-minute episodes, which first screened on the ABC in 1975.

== Cast ==
- Serge Lazareff as Alexander 'Boots' Wellington
- Julieanne Newbould
- Gordon Glenwright
- Tony Bonner
- Anne Phelan
- Colin McEwan
- Syd Conabere
- Rosie Sturgess
- Natalie Mosco

== See also ==
- List of Australian television series
