= Godfrey Philipp =

- Born: Godfrey Pettersson Philipp; 1936; England
- Died: 21 April 2011 (aged 74–75); Melbourne, Victoria, Australia
- Occupations: Actor; television producer; television director; floor manager

Godfrey Pettersson Philipp (1936 – 21 April 2011) was an English-born pioneering television producer/director of Australian children's television during the 1960s and 1970s.

== Biography ==
Phillip was born Godfrey Pettersson Philipp in England in 1936, and had been a child actor before emigrating to Australia. In 1959 he worked at GTV9 Melbourne as assistant floor manager, before becoming assistant producer of In Melbourne Tonight and later producer-director of The Breakfast Show.

After a stint working at NBN3 in Newcastle, Philipp joined the fledgling ATV0 in Melbourne (later to become part of Network Ten Australia) producing The Children's Show. In 1965, he teamed with writer John-Michael Howson to create The Magic Circle Club, which took The Children's Show's timeslot. Philipp served as the program's executive producer/director.

When The Magic Circle Club was cancelled in 1967, Philipp worked as producer/director on sitcom Hey You! for ATV0 before joining again with Howson to create Adventure Island for ABC National Television, which shared a similar premise and format with The Magic Circle Club, along with much of the same cast and crew. Again Philipp was the executive producer/director of each episode. The program was notable for being the ABC's first co-production with an outside production company (Godfrey Philipp Productions).

On both The Magic Circle Club and Adventure Island, Philipp made innovative use of the opportunities afforded by the televisual technology of the day to create previously unseen (on Australian TV productions) special effects to realize the programs’ fantasy aspects.

When Adventure Island was cancelled in 1972, Philipp worked as a freelance producer/director. He directed an episode of Skyways for Channel Seven in 1979.

Working for Reg Grundy Productions, Philipp was the second executive producer of Prisoner for Network Ten in 1979 and also directed episodes of the series.

== Awards and recognition ==
Philipp received a special Logie award in 1973 for his contribution to Australian children's television. In 1979, he worked at Northern Rivers Television to create a new children's program called Rainbow, which was not picked up by any of Australia's national television networks. However his work on this program was recognized with another Logie award.

After leaving the television industry in the 1980s, Philipp worked voluntarily for The Salvation Army. In later life he suffered from osteoporosis.

== Death ==
He died on 21 April 2011. His final years were spent in the aged care residence of Sumner House, Brotherhood of St Lawrence in Fitzroy, Victoria.
