= The Barry Creyton Show =

- Genre: Daytime television
- Presented by: Barry Creyton
- Country of origin: Australia
- Original language: English

Production
- Producer: Richard Gray
- Production company: NLT Productions

Original release
- Network: Seven Network
- Release: 10 July – 3 November 1967

The Barry Creyton Show is an Australian television talk show series that aired in 1967, and was presented by its namesake Barry Creyton, star of The Mavis Bramston Show, airing on what would eventually become the Seven Network. Featured guest stars included Terry Norris and Vi Greenhalf and Liz Harris.

The half-hour daytime series was produced by Richard Gray of NLT Productions, and was taped in Melbourne. It debuted 10 July 1967, and ended on 3 November 1967.

== Cast ==
=== Presenter ===
- Barry Creyton

=== Guest stars ===
- Terry Norris
- Vi Greenhalf
- Noeline Brown
- Liz Harris
