= Fredd Bear's Breakfast-A-Go-Go =

- Genre: Children's television
- Presented by: Tedd Dunn
- Country of origin: Australia
- Original language: English
- No. of seasons: 4

Production
- Production locations: Melbourne, Victoria
- Running time: 30 minutes

Original release
- Network: ATV-0 for 0-10 Network
- Release: 1969 – 1972

Fredd Bear's Breakfast A-Go-Go was an Australian children's television show which started in 1969 on ATV Channel 0 (now ATV-10).

== Program synopsis ==
Fredd Bear's Breakfast-A Go-Go ran five days a week (Monday to Friday from 7am) for three years, with a mixture of cartoons, serials, music clips, news, and entertainment, it was comparable to an early Hey Hey It's Saturday.

The show was hosted by Fredd Bear (Tedd Dunn), a lively non-speaking character first seen on the Magic Circle Club, and Judy Banks. Regulars included Colin McEwan, newsreader Michael McCarthy and magician Ian Buckland. Bruce Rowland was the musical director and wrote the theme tune. In 1975, he won a Logie Award for Outstanding Creative Effort for his work on the program. For much of his time as Fredd Bear, Dunn was also costume and wardrobe Director on the soap opera The Box.

A membership card system was one of the methods by which the show's young audience was encouraged to stay viewing. At intervals of approximately 10–15 minutes, a viewer's membership card number would be superimposed on the screen, entitling the viewer to a prize if they contacted the station.

Since each day's show was videotaped purely for reference purposes and not archived, with the same tape reused every day, almost none of the show remains in existence. The only footage from Fredd Bear's Breakfast-A-Go-Go believed to exist is a performance by former Seekers member Bruce Woodley of his advertising jingle The ANZ Bank Travelling Man. A brief excerpt from what appears to be a promotional film from 1972 is held by the National Film and Sound Archive.

The album Judy Banks - A Paw Full of Songs was produced by her husband Bob Phillips and released in 1972.

In 1969, Sydney's Good Morning!!! breakfast show on TEN-10 was renamed Breakfast-a-Go-Go, bringing it into line with the Melbourne program.

== Cast ==
- Tedd Dunn - host (as Fredd Bear)
- Judy Banks - host
- Colin McEwan - regular guest
- Michael McCarthy - regular guest
- Ian Buckland - regular guest
- Bruce Woodley - guest
- Bruce Rowland - musical director
