= Magic Circle Club =

1965–1967 Australian children's TV series

- Genre: Children's television
- Created by: Godfrey Philipp
- Written by: John Howson; Max Bartlett
- Directed by: Godfrey Philipp; Rob Weekes
- Presented by: Nancy Cato; Liz Harris
- Starring: Max Bartlett; Ernie Bourne; Nancy Cato; Gael Dixon; Tedd Dunn; Nola Finn; Liz Harris; Gabrielle Hartley; John Howson; Colin McEwan; Fred Tupper; Marion Weir
- Theme music composer: Bruce Rowland
- Opening theme: Hip, Hooray and Hello
- Country of origin: Australia
- Original language: English
- No. of seasons: 3
- No. of episodes: 555

Production
- Executive producer: Godfrey Philipp
- Producer: Rob Weekes
- Production location: Melbourne
- Running time: 30 minutes

Original release
- Network: 0–10 Network
- Release: 23 January 1965 – July 1967

Related
- The Children's Show; Adventure Island

The Magic Circle Club was an award-winning Australian children's television show, produced at ATV Channel 0 (now ATV-10) from 23 January 1965 to 1967.

The program's style came from live pantomime and classic fairy tales. It often featured music, original songs and dance routines. Some older female characters were performed by males, in pantomime dame style.

Godfrey Philipp was the producer and director, with many scripts and song lyrics by John-Michael Howson. Max Bartlett became a regular script writer in addition to his on-screen roles. Music was by Bruce Rowland and scenery designs by Brian Thomson.

The show was hosted by Nancy Cato, cousin of the author of the same name. A later addition to the regular cast was Liz Harris, who also took over as hostess when Nancy Cato suffered temporary paralysis and had to use a wheelchair.

In 1966, the TV series won the first Logie Award presented to a children's show, for Outstanding Contribution To Children's Television.

== Characters ==
Regular characters were denizens of the Magic Forest: mute Fredd Bear (Tedd Dunn, also the costume designer); shrill Fee Fee Bear (John-Michael Howson, billed as John Howson); feisty Mother Matilda Hubbard (Fred Tupper, a former radio star); sensible Max (Max Bartlett); Shirley Temple analog Curley Dimples (played by adult Gael Dixon, also the show's choreographer); beautiful enchantress Crystal Ball (Gabrielle Hartley) and her pet, Hep Cat (Nola Finn); Marlena DeWitch (Marion Weir); and villainous Sir Jasper Crookly (Ernie Bourne) and his henchman Gaspar Goblin (Colin McEwan).

Recurring guest characters included BoBo the clown (Charles "Hal" Turner), Montmorency James Rabbit (Ernie Bourne), Sebastian Bear (Gael Dixon), and Aunty Vale (Bunney Brooke). Twoddle & Boddle (Laurie Allen and Bobby Bright, aka Bobby & Laurie of The Go!! Show) were analogs of Tweedledee & Tweedledum, characters the pair had played previously in a pantomime. Max Bartlett often played additional guest characters, including Harley Quin, a harlequin performer, King Size of nearby Enchantmentland, wicked innkeeper Simon Sneak of the Cross and Bones, or Mother Hubbard's accident-prone great-nephew, Claude Clumsy. Ernie Bourne and Colin McEwan often doubled up roles to play guest villains. Even Nancy Cato played a chambermaid, Sweet Nelly, in a Barbary Coast pirate storyline.

== Format ==
Storylines were typically serialized across five days, with the Friday program usually wrapping up the week's adventure. Each episode finished up with the hostess sitting on a large mushroom, with Fredd crouched beside her (usually after dusting off the stool with a handkerchief), while the pair shared viewers' letters and artwork.

Daily features included viewers' riddles with Cassius Cuckoo, during "Cassius Cuckoo's Corn Corner", and limericks with Leonardo de Funbird. These characters were wood and felt bird puppets (created by Axel Axelrad; voiced by Colin McEwan). Cassius inhabited a longcase cuckoo clock next to Mother Hubbard's cupboard in The Magic Cottage, and Leonardo lived inside the IKAN (Instantaneous Knowledge Accumulation Network) computer (voice of Fred Tupper). The IKAN educational segment was eventually dropped, and Leonardo would present his limerick segment from a tree stump in the Magic Forest.

Towards the end of the TV series' run, stories were serialized across only four days, with the Friday program dedicated to a separate story, told by Liz Harris, about toys which come to life in a toyshop when the owner was absent. Liz, herself, played a rag doll, Max Bartlett was a tin soldier, and John-Michael Howson played a glum clown, a portrayal which would inspire his Adventure Island character of Clown.

== Stage version ==
A specially written Magic Circle Club episode, "The Stolen Smile", was performed live on stage at the Tivoli Theatre from 27 December 1965. In this adventure, Sir Jasper and Gaspar had banished Clocko the chief clown (Max Bartlett, again playing a dual role), and Spangles the trapeze artist (Gael Dixon), from their circus, and taken away Clocko's smile. Appearing on stage with Max, Curley and Nancy were Fredd, Fee Fee, Mother Hubbard, Crystal Ball, Hep Cat, Montmorency, Cassius and Leonardo, all played by the regular TV cast. This production was stage managed by Sue Nattras, Simon Wincer and Jim McElroy.

Gabrielle Hartley was severely burned when her cloak brushed over a hot "flash pot" used in a live, on-stage, special effect, and her role had to be assumed by her understudy. Hartley never returned to her TV role, the character of Crystal Ball being written out.

== Cancellation and beyond ==
After producing 555 thirty-minute episodes, ATV axed the show for cost reasons. Competitor ABC TV wanted to buy it, but ATV refused, which led to the start up of the similar program Adventure Island on the ABC, with many of the same cast and writers from Magic Circle Club.

Recorded in black and white, the program was repeated prior to the official introduction of colour TV in 1975. John-Michael Howson had wanted to produce the show in colour for overseas sales, but management baulked at the added cost.

TV director and costume designer Tedd Dunn stayed with Melbourne's Channel 0. He played the Fredd Bear character (Channel 0's answer to the Nine Network's more enduring Humphrey B. Bear) two years after the demise of Magic Circle Club, as co-host of Fredd Bear's Breakfast-A-Go-Go. His suit has since been donated to the National Film & Sound Archive for restoration and safe storage. Cassius and Leonardo also appeared on Breakfast-A-Go-Go, as did actor Colin McEwan and newsreader Michael McCarthy. Fee Fee, now mute without Howson's unique vocal contribution, was often played by Michael's wife, Caroline McCarthy. Max Bartlett continued to work in television production, moving to Western Australia, where he helped to develop Fat Cat and Friends and The Underground Video Show.

In 2004, Nancy Cato appeared on the "Kids' TV" episode of Bob Downe's The Way We Were, briefly discussing Magic Circle Club.

== Archival remnants ==
The NFSA has preserved 198 episodes of The Magic Circle Club.
