= Dig a Million, Make a Million =

Dig a Million, Make a Million is an Australian television documentary produced and directed by Tom Heydon for the Australian Broadcasting Commission, broadcast on ABC-TV on 9 June 1969. It concerns foreign ownership of Australian mining.

It received an Australian Film Institute Silver Award for Documentary in December 1969. It also received a Logie Award for Outstanding Documentary the following year.
