= David Clencie =

Australian actor

- Born: 1964 or 1965 (age 61–62); Australia
- Occupations: Actor, Real estate agent, Voice-over artist
- Years active: 1980–present
- Children: 1

David Clencie is an Australian actor. He made his debut aged 14 in the children's television series Sam's Luck. He was cast in the lead role of Sam Parkes, after impressing the producer while auditioning for the ABC network. He then appeared in police drama Cop Shop and the 1981 miniseries I Can Jump Puddles. The following year, Clencie joined the cast of The Sullivans as Steve Sullivan, a role which he considered to be his big break. He also had roles in Home, A Country Practice, and Starting Out. From 1985 until 1986, Clencie played Danny Ramsay in the soap opera Neighbours. He left the cast after he and the producers agreed that his character would be rested. After leaving Neighbours, Clencie had a career in real estate and became a voice-over artist for television commercials. He made guest appearances in numerous television dramas, including Blue Heelers. He briefly reprised his Neighbours role in July 2005.

== Early life ==
Clencie grew up in the Melbourne suburb of East Malvern. His mother was a homemaker and his father owned an advertising agency. He has a younger sister. Clencie's father committed suicide in 1993, and Clencie later believed this event led to him becoming dependent on alcohol. Clencie attended Melbourne Grammar School. He was a percussionist in the Victorian Youth Symphony Orchestra and also played football.

== Career ==
Clencie made his first television appearance aged 15 in the 1980 children's series Sam's Luck. Clencie had very little acting experience prior to auditioning for ABC, but he impressed the producer of the series, who then cast him in the lead role. Clencie starred as Sam Parkes, who wins some money betting on the races and takes care of his younger siblings while their mother is in Singapore. Jill Morris of The Age praised Clencie for his performance. The following year, Clencie made a guest appearance in police drama Cop Shop, and he played Joe in the miniseries I Can Jump Puddles. During filming, he was knocked out when he fell from a horse. Clencie then went on to join the main cast of The Sullivans as Jim Sullivan's (Andy Anderson) younger brother, Steve. At the time, The Sullivans was Australia's most watched television show and Clencie considered the role his big break.

In 1983, Clencie appeared in the children's television series Home as Mike the stablehand, and guested in an episode of A Country Practice. He also starred in the short-lived soap opera Starting Out as student Ben McNamara. Clencie branded it the "lowlight" of his career at the time. After Starting Out was cancelled, Clencie left television for a time to appear in various theatre productions, including Michael Gow's The Kid, which he called a highlight of his career. He also worked in the art department of the Network Ten miniseries The Dunera Boys, became involved in music and joined a band. Clencie had a role in the Australian feature film Run, Chrissie, Run! in 1984, but it was not released until 1986.

In 1984, Clencie joined the cast of new soap opera Neighbours as teenager Danny Ramsay. He initially signed on for six months with a six month option. He admitted to being "tentative" about signing up for another long-running series. He also told Patrice Fidgeon of TV Week that he had to give up a role in a Chekov play when he joined Neighbours. However, he found his character interesting and thought he was "a bit different from all the others." Neighbours premiered on 18 March 1985, and Jacqueline Lee Lewis of The Sydney Morning Herald included Clencie in her list of younger actors "worth keeping an eye on." Neighbours was cancelled by Seven Network in its first year due to low ratings, but it was soon saved by rival network Ten. During the break between filming, Clencie began a relationship with his co-star Vikki Blanche and the couple lived together for six months.

Clencie filmed his final scenes for Neighbours in June 1986. The media speculated that he had been sacked from the role, but Clencie clarified in a TV Week interview that he and the producers had come to a mutual agreement that his character would be rested. He explained that he was offered three different contracts, but it was eventually agreed that he would take a break. Clencie admitted to having had "an unprofessional attitude in the past" and letting down the cast and crew, but he had changed his ways and it did not contribute to his departure. Clencie's workload had dropped from five episodes a week to two, as the show began focussing on other characters. He thought there was a lot of potential for Danny, but accepted that Neighbours had moved in a different direction. Clencie's final scenes aired in July 1986, as his character relocates to another town for work.

After leaving Neighbours, Clencie began a career in real estate. In 1987, he helped to sell his former co-star Stefan Dennis's Elwood house. He also became a voice-over artist for television commercials. Clencie later returned to acting with guest roles in television dramas, including Blue Heelers. In July 2005, he joined several former Neighbours cast members in reprising their roles for an appearance in the show's 20th anniversary episode. Clencie was highly critical of the serial's 2022 then-finale and the producers, accusing them of stealing a storyline idea for his character.

== Personal life ==
In October 2014, Clencie was arrested for assaulting his partner twice in one day, while under the influence of alcohol. He admitted in court that he had a 30-year alcohol addiction, and had acted in self defence. Clencie was refused bail. He later pleaded guilty to the charges, and served three months in Melbourne Remand Centre and three months in Port Phillip Prison. In March 2015, Clencie was arrested and jailed for 15 days after breaching a family violence order, after police found him at the home of his partner. His lawyer told the court that Clencie's partner had applied to have the intervention order removed, and they should have waited before meeting. He also said that Clencie was "substantially" free of alcohol, having undergone rehabilitation and counselling.

Clencie and his partner, Megan, got engaged a month after he left jail. They married in front of their family and friends in October 2015.

Clencie has a son from a previous relationship. He is a Richmond Tigers supporter, and has a diploma in horticulture.

== Filmography ==
Film and television performances
Year	Title	Role	Notes
1980	Sam's Luck	Sam Parkes	Main cast
1981	Cop Shop	Joey Baxter	Episodes: #299 and #300
1981	I Can Jump Puddles	Joe Carmichael	Miniseries
1982	The Sullivans	Steve Sullivan	Main cast
1983	Home	Mike	Recurring role
1983	A Country Practice	Rick Jamieson	Episode: "Pioneering Spirit"
1983	Starting Out	Ben McNamara	Main cast
1985–1986; 2005	Neighbours	Danny Ramsay	Main cast
1986	Run, Chrissie, Run!	Paul	Feature film
2001	Blue Heelers	Bob Bancroft	Episode: "Chop Chop"
2001	Stingers	Human Services Manager	Episode: "Closure"
2002	Stingers	Jocko	Episode: "Old Scores"
2002	MDA	Jack Panogeas	Episode: "Scylla and Charybdis"
2003	Fergus McPhail	Car owner	Episode: "Buddies"
2003	Blue Heelers	Mark Deeble	Episode: "Cast the First Stone"
