= Planet Records (Australian record label) =

- Founded: 1954
- Founder: Bob King Crawford
- Defunct: 1961
- Status: Defunct
- Genre: Various
- Country of origin: Australia
- Location: Melbourne

Planet Records was an independent Australian record label that was founded in the 1950s. Acts that recorded for the label include, the The Andre Schuster Ensemble, Judy Banks, the Henri Bource All Stars, Kevin Shegog, The Three Beats, Alan Rhodes & his Orchestra, and the Hi-Marks.

== Background ==
Planet Records was founded by Bob King Crawford in 1954. It would become Australia's largest independent record company during that period.

Crawford also formed the Talent City label which would release some earlier Planet recordings.

Besides Talent City, other record labels connected with Planet Records were, the Galaxy, Star, Baton, Constellation, Jazz Inc, Homestead, Probe, Rebel, and Choir labels.

== History ==
In 1955, Planet Records and Constellation Records released the Billy Hyde album, Drumbeat on PXC 101.

By February 1956, Bob Crawford and Marcus Herman were promoting their six-track 7" EPs. The process for putting three tracks on each side was allegedly a secret. The first release was Samba Rhumba Time by The Three Beats, an ensemble comprising Andre Schuster on bass, Wally Wood on bongos and Adriano Giusti on piano.

In 1956, The Don Harper Quartette released the Hot Fiddle album on Planet subsidiary, Constellation CMG 101.

Rochelle Turner was a singer who had been a permanent fixture at the Chevron Hotel, in St. Kilda Road since 1955.It was reported in the 18 February 1956 issue of The Argus that the young singer had recorded songs for Planet and they were to be released on a record shortly. A 10 Inch LP Songs of World War Two that was released was credited to Bruce Clarke and his Music with Rochelle Turner, Jack Bowkett and the Commandos. The album was reviewed by Bernard Fletcher in the 10 October 1956 issue of the Australian Women's Weekly. Fletcher wrote that the producers deserved a handclap for the originality of presenting a medley of tunes that represented the spirit of their servicemen of that period. However, he also wrote that he would have preferred the music to be more off mike so that the singers could be more forward.

André Schuster was a maestro gypsy violinist and double bass player from Transylvania. He had played with the Bernard Etté und sein Orchester, and been a member of Teddy Stauffer und seine Original Teddies. In Australia, he was part of the Andre and Adriano act which was made up of himself on bass and pianist Adriano Guisti. According to the 6 August 1955 issue of The Argus, Schuster was playing a Framus "Triumph" electric metal-stringed bass which was imported from Germany. The team of Schuster and Guisti achieved a level of popularity with the supper crowd and by March 1956 had moved back to the Astoria Hotel. Andre Schuster and his group, The Andre Schuster Ensemble released their In Exotic Rhythm EP on Planet PZ017 in 1956. The EP would be reissued in 1963 on the Talent City label.

In 1958 Planet Records produced Australia's first rock and roll album, Rock and Roll Dance Party which featured the artists, the Henri Bource All Stars, Peter McLean and Beverly Dick.

in 1960 Kevin Shegog had his six-track Deep Down in Shegog EP released on Planet PZ 151.

In 1961, the label released the Peter Mc Lean single, "Starbright" bw "Clementine" on Planet PX-039.

Planet records was bought out by a company called Telefil in 1961. Planet also came to an that year.
