= Off to the Races (game show) =

- Genre: Game show
- Presented by: Bert Bryant
- Country of origin: Australia
- Original language: English

Production
- Production company: LKN Productions

Original release
- Network: ATV-0
- Release: 1967 – 1969

Off to the Races was an Australian television game show which aired from 1967 to 1969. Produced by LKN Productions and hosted by Bert Bryant, and aired on ATV-0 (now ATV-10 and part of Network Ten). Despite its short run, it was a popular show.

== Episode status ==
Five episodes are held by National Film and Sound Archive. Given the wiping of that era and generally low survival rate of ATV series of the 1960s, it is unlikely any other episodes still exist.
