= Be My Guest (Australian TV series) =

- Genre: Talk show
- Presented by: Eric Pearce
- Country of origin: Australia

Production
- Running time: 15 minutes

Original release
- Network: HSV-7
- Release: 30 January – 24 April 1957

Be My Guest is an early Australian television series, which aired weekly on Melbourne station HSV-7 from 30 January 1957 to 24 April 1957. Episodes were 15 minutes in duration (following a 15-minute newscast), and hosted by Eric Pearce. It was likely an interview series, but little is known about it, and it is not known if any kinescope recordings were made of it. However, despite its obscurity, it is notable as an early example of Australian-produced television content.

The series aired at 7:15 p.m. on Wednesdays. The series aired against U.S. series The Adventures of Wild Bill Hickok on GTV-9 and U.S. series The Life of Riley (the second version, starring William Bendix) on ABV-2.
