= Bert Bryant =

Australian racecaller

Bert Bryant (1927–1991) is regarded as one of Australia's top racecallers of Thoroughbred horse racing in the twentieth century.

His career as a racecaller began in western New South Wales on country racetracks. In 1948, while living in Dubbo he successfully auditioned for a job with Melbourne radio station 3UZ where his personality and colourful racecalls made him an enduring success for the next 30 years as Director of Sport. His racing programs and racecalls attracted a listening audience of 2.5 million through links to radio stations around Australia.

Among thousands of races, his call of the two horse war between Big Philou and Rain Lover in the 1970 Queen Elizabeth Stakes is considered an epic. In a very close finish, Bert plumped, rightly, for Big Philou. He said "If you got it wrong in a two-horse race, you’d have to give it up forever."

He suffered a cerebral haemorrhage in 1978 which ended his racecalling career. In 1985 he was diagnosed with a cancerous stomach tumour, which he overcame, but suffered from depression in later years and died in 1991.

In 2003 Bert Bryant was inducted into the Australian Racing Hall of Fame.

== Colourful expressions ==
Bert was famous for his wit and humor in his race previews and during his race calls. Here are some of his colourful expressions:

- A no-hoper in a race: couldn’t pull the skin off a bread and butter custard.
- A horse bandaged on all four legs was: carrying enough bandage to start their own field hospital.
- A racecourse tout had: more tips than a can of asparagus.
- Good form coming into a race suggested: Where there's smoke, there’s blue cod.
- An erratic runner was said to be: hanging like granny’s tooth.
- A bold front runner had: a wing on every foot. or had gone for the doctor.
- A horse tailed off at the end of a race would: need a lantern to find the way home.
- A horse racing wide on the home turn was: covering more territory than Burke and Wills or: covered more ground than the early explorers.
- A horse that was racing fiercely was: pulling like a Collins Street dentist.
- If a longshot got up Bert remarked: You deserve a gold bike if you picked this one.
- In a busy finish Bert remarked: They came like a swarm of ants... and didn't they march to the line in no mean order.
- If a horse fell in a jumps race Bert would say: He's dropped his lollies.
- If a horse blundered in a jumps race and threw the jockey high in the irons Bert would say: The rider called for a cab.
- Higgins had a look around to see where The General is, but I think The General like Custers last stand has had it.
- Ahh! isn't it cruel
- He who hesitates is an old-time waltzer.
- Bert used to refer to the Quadrella as The Giggle.
- In the Big Philou – Rain Lover match race, one of his best lines was: There won't be much change for a while, so if you want to put the kettle on now would be a good time to do so.
- The rider is bobbing up and down like a cork in the Pacific.
- In his call of the 1969 Melbourne Cup Bert said: And shades of 1968, Rain Lover dashed to the front. At the exact moment he calls this, there is a massive roar from the on course crowd.
- Bert hosted a racing show on Melbourne radio station 3UZ every Saturday morning with Sydney racecaller Clif Cary, called Turf Talk. It was compelling listening for punters around Australia. Bert often remarked that some of his least liked horses were listening to the show.
