= Ernie Bourne =

Australian actor

- Ernie Bourne as Mervin Pringle in Prisoner: Cell Block H
- Born: Ernest Alfred Bourne; 1 August 1926; Shaftesbury, Dorset, England
- Died: 21 January 2009 (aged 82); Prahran, Victoria, Australia
- Occupations: Actor; entertainer; comedian; puppeteer
- Years active: 1945-1952 (England), 1952, 1955–2005 (Australia)
- Known for: The Magic Circle Club; Adventure Island; Prisoner as Mervyn Pringle

Ernest Alfred Bourne (1 August 1926 – 21 January 2009) was an English and Australian actor, entertainer, comedian and puppeteer, whose career spanned 50 years. Having started his career in theatre in his native England, he became known for his regular roles in theatre and television in Australia, particularly in character roles. Bourne was probably best known locally and internationally for his role as prison chef Mervin Pringle in the TV series Prisoner and as mechanic Rob Lewis in Neighbours.

== Life and career ==
Bourne was born in Shaftesbury, Dorset, England, and raised in Yeovil, Somerset, where his mother ran a boarding house following the early death of his father. Leaving school and home at the age of 14, Bourne worked in a cafe before joining the British Merchant Navy during World War II, where he became interested in acting after appearing in a pantomime. He would appear regularly in English pantomime and in many stage productions in Bristol, before migrating to Australia.

He emigrated to Australia in 1952, initially settling in Geelong. Joining the Geelong Musical Comedy Company, he appeared in numerous stage roles starting from 1955 and later moving to Melbourne. In the 1960s, he was loved (and booed) as a series of pantomime-style villains on Australian television such as Sir Jasper Crookley (in Magic Circle Club), and multiple similar baddies in Adventure Island including Sir Cedric Sneak, Captain Crook, Chummy Chums and Miser Meanie's sidekick Fester Fumble.

Throughout the early-to-mid 1970s he was a staple of Crawford Productions police dramas in a variety of character roles. In the 1980s he played prison chef Mervin Pringle in Prisoner (having earlier played two other minor roles) and garage mechanic Rob Lewis in Neighbours.

He also appeared in a series of television commercials for a retail sportsgear outlet (Sportsmart) as an older man (playing golf and tennis) who is perpetually laughed at by a young blonde man for spending too much money on his gear elsewhere. He has a daughter Sally Bourne who is also an actress and is best known for appearing in the musicals of Andrew Lloyd Webber.

Bourne was married to Claire Bourne (formerly Smith). He died on 21 January 2009, aged 82, at The Alfred Hospital in Melbourne.

== Filmography (selected) ==
Year	Title	Role
1960	You Too Can Have A Body	unknown
1964	Consider Your Verdict	John Drummond
1964	The Road (TV movie)	
1964	Under Stress (film short)	
1965	The Magic Circle Club (TV series)	Sir Jasper Crookley
1967	Hey You! (TV series)	Major. Hugh T. Worthington
1967	Adventure Island (TV series)	Fester Fumble- Flower Potts, Miser Meanie
1969	Good Morning, Mister Double Day (TV series)	Bentley
1969	Sounds Like Us (TV series)	Fester Fumble
1973	Gully James	
1973-1974	Ryan (TV series)	Ned Robbins, Meechum
1974	It's Magic (TV series)	
1975	Dick Down Under (TV series)	Barman
1975	Cash and Company (TV series)	Joshua Henry Biggs
1970-1975	Division 4 (TV series)	6 roles: "Shaky" Miller; Harry Jack; Willie Evans; John Hyland; George Mitchell; parking officer
1972-1975	Matlock Police (TV series)	6 roles: Jim; Andy Hill; Fred Harris; George Turner; Col Cameron; Dumpy
1970-1976	Homicide	9 character roles: Albert Canker; Marcos Mitrakis; Matthew Clarke; Dudley Roberts; George Stevens; George Hodges; William "Poker Face" Martin; Freddy Knight; Caretaker Faye
1976	The Sullivans	University Lecturer
1977	The Picture Show Man	Bookmaker
1976-1977	Bluey	Davies/Timms
1978	Bobby Dazzler (TV series)	Seymour
1978	Against the Wind (TV mini-series)	Surgeon Beyer
1980	Sam's Luck (TV series)	Benno
1980	Young Ramsey (TV series)	Blowfly
1980	The Last Outlaw (TV mini-series)	Gloster
1981	Grendel, Grendel, Grendel | voice artist	
1977-1981	Cop Shop (TV series)	Various roles
1982	Squizzy Taylor	Barber
1982	Lonely Hearts	Man in Toilet
1983	All the Rivers Run	Boat Builder
1984	Infinity Limited (TV series)	Bernie
1984	Carson's Law (TV series)	Barney Tibbs
1979, 1981, 1984-1986	Prisoner	Dr. Crewe, Peter Hope, Mervin Pringle (75 episodes)
1987–1989	Neighbours	Rob Lewis (90 episodes)
1991	All Together Now (TV serial)	Andy Williams fan
1993	Skytrackers	Mr Krauss
1996	Mercury (TV series)	Claude Cartwright
1998	Good Guys, Bad Guys (TV series)	AlfieZinsinger
1999	Thunderstone (TV series)	Pohl
2003	Blue Heelers	Stan Butterworth
