= Sounds Like Us =

- Genre: Music television
- Written by: Godfrey Philipp
- Directed by: Godfrey Philipp; Dennis Price; Jack Manuel
- Presented by: Jeff Phillips
- Country of origin: Australia
- Original language: English
- No. of seasons: 3
- No. of episodes: 18

Original release
- Network: ABC
- Release: 2 October 1969 – 1970

Sounds Like Us was an Australian music television series aimed at viewers in their teens and twenties. Hosted by Jeff Phillips, it featured guest stars performing with a thirty-two piece band, directed by the composer and conductor Brian May, and eighteen singers and dancers. Performances were live with no miming. The first episode aired on 2 October 1969, with guests Bev Harrell and Bryan Davies.

== See also ==
- List of Australian music television shows
