= The Mike Walsh Show =

- Genre: Variety/talk show
- Presented by: Mike Walsh
- Country of origin: Australia
- Original language: English
- No. of seasons: 12

Production
- Running time: 90 minutes

Original release
- Network: Seven Network (1969-71); Network Ten (1973–76); Nine Network (1977–85)
- Release: 5 February 1973 – 8 August 1985

The Mike Walsh Show is an Australian award-winning variety/talk show television series originally broadcast as a prime time program, before becoming a midday staple. Hosted by Mike Walsh, it broadcast during its tenure on the three commercial networks, the originally late night version on the Seven Network, before being relaunched as a daytime (midday) version firstly on Ten Network and then consequently on the Nine Network.

The programs was best known for its roster of celebrity guests, with award-winning interviews and live performances,

== History ==
=== Early inception ===
The Mike Walsh Show in its original format was a Thursday night variety show broadcast on the Seven Network (HSV-7), in Melbourne, started airing from 14 August 1969. It was revamped to an interview-based format and extended its coverage to the Seven Network ATN-7, Sydney, from 18 March 1971. The program aired for the last time on 8 July 1971.

=== Network Ten and Nine Network ===
The Screen Gems company and the 0-10 Network launched The Mike Walsh Show, on 5 February 1973 and produced at TEN-10, Sydney, as a daytime program, broadcast Monday to Friday in the early afternoons.

In late 1976, Walsh announced that he was taking the show across to the Nine Network, with the first show from TCN-9, Sydney, on 7 February 1977 and airing in the midday timeslot.

At the Nine Network, The Mike Walsh Show increased its coverage to include almost every capital city and regional market in Australia.

== Description ==
The program featured the latest in media and politics including covering the latest news, music, film, television, fashion and gossip, and garnered around 5 million viewers locally each week, and presented live performances and interviews from celebrities both locally and internationally.

International guest celebrities included: Alan Alda, Steve Allen, Lauren Bacall, Big Bird, Johnny Cash, Cher, John Cleese, Billy Connolly, Jamie Lee Curtis, Tony Curtis, Vic Damone, Sammy Davis Jr., Phyllis Diller, Kirk Douglas, Michael Douglas, Sheena Easton, Jane Fonda, Bob Hope, Whitney Houston, Bette Midler, Helen Mirren, Roger Moore, Johnny Nash, Olivia Newton-John, Peter O'Toole, Gregory Peck, Vincent Price, Oliver Reed, Lionel Richie, Mickey Rooney, Demis Roussos, Leo Sayer, Boz Scaggs, Del Shannon, John Travolta, Tina Turner, The Village People, Dionne Warwick, Robin Williams, and Stevie Wonder

== Awards ==
The program won a total of 24 Logie awards including a Gold Logie for Jeanne Little in 1977, and host Mike Walsh in 1980. It also won the following awards:

Association	Award	Year	Results
Logie Awards	Logie x 24+		Won
United Nations Association of Australia	UN Media Peace Prize		Won
Logie Awards	Gold Logie for host Mike Walsh	1980	Won
Logie Award	Gold Logie for Jeanne Little	1977	Won

== Re-programming ==
In February 1985, The Mike Walsh Show moved from its popular daytime timeslot to an evening timeslot, two nights a week. The program in the prime time format was not successful, although The Mike Walsh Show's successor in the daytime slot, Midday with a very similar format to The Mike Walsh Show, ran for fourteen years, garnering numerous awards.
