= Cultural depictions of Napoleon =

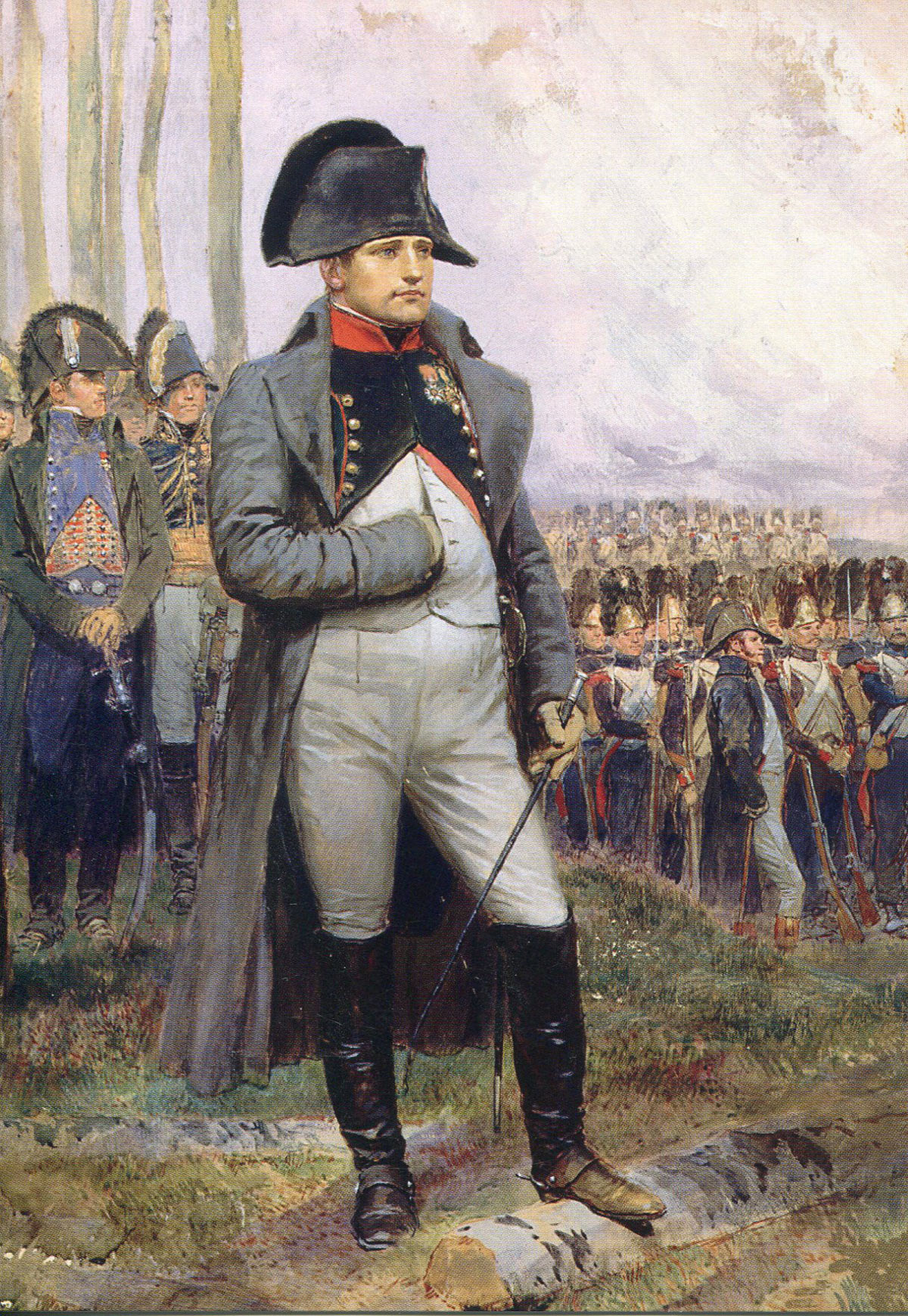
Napoleon is often represented in his green colonel uniform of the Chasseur à Cheval, with a large bicorne and a hand-in-waistcoat gesture.

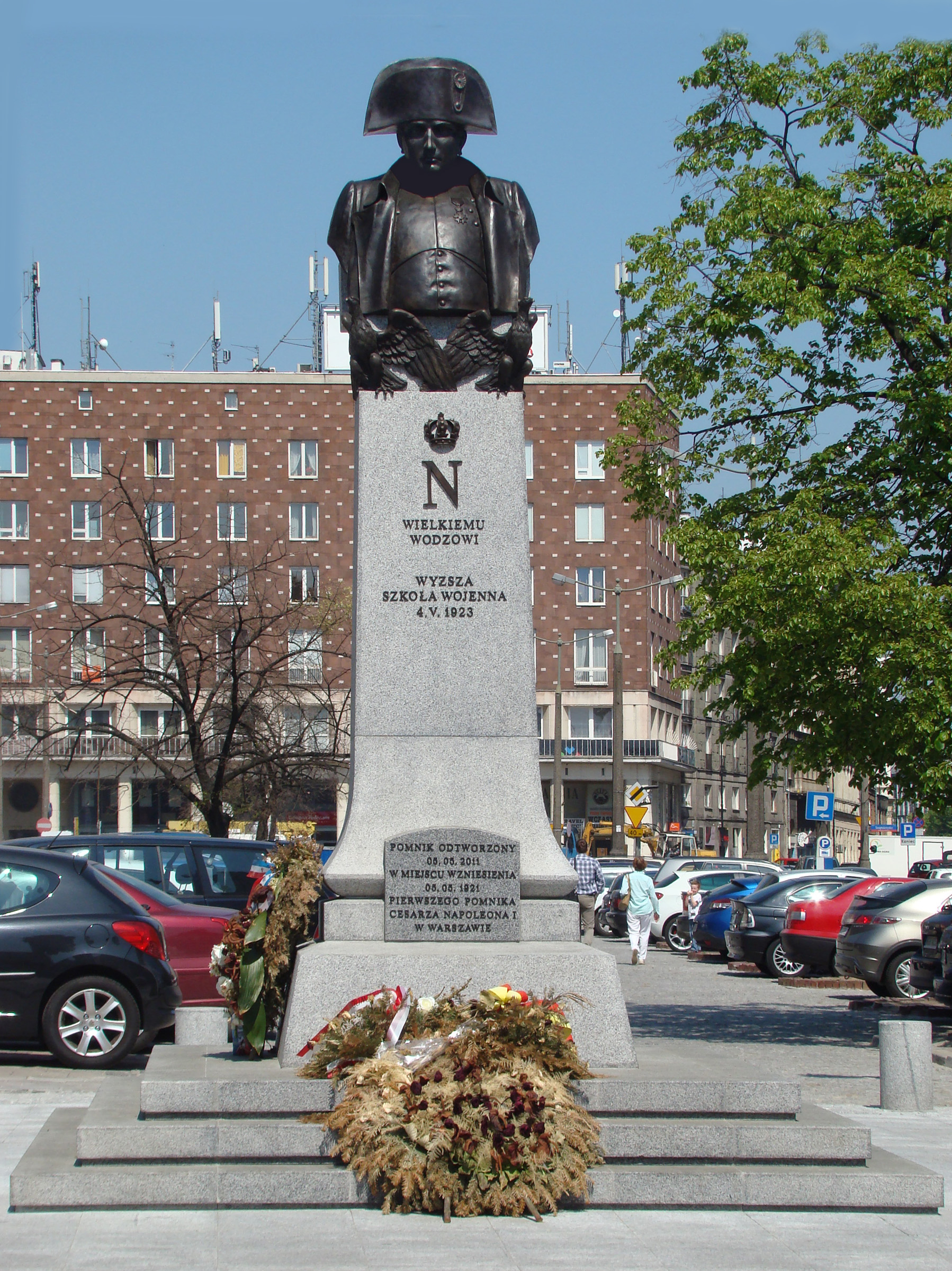
The Napoleon Bonaparte Monument in Warsaw, Poland

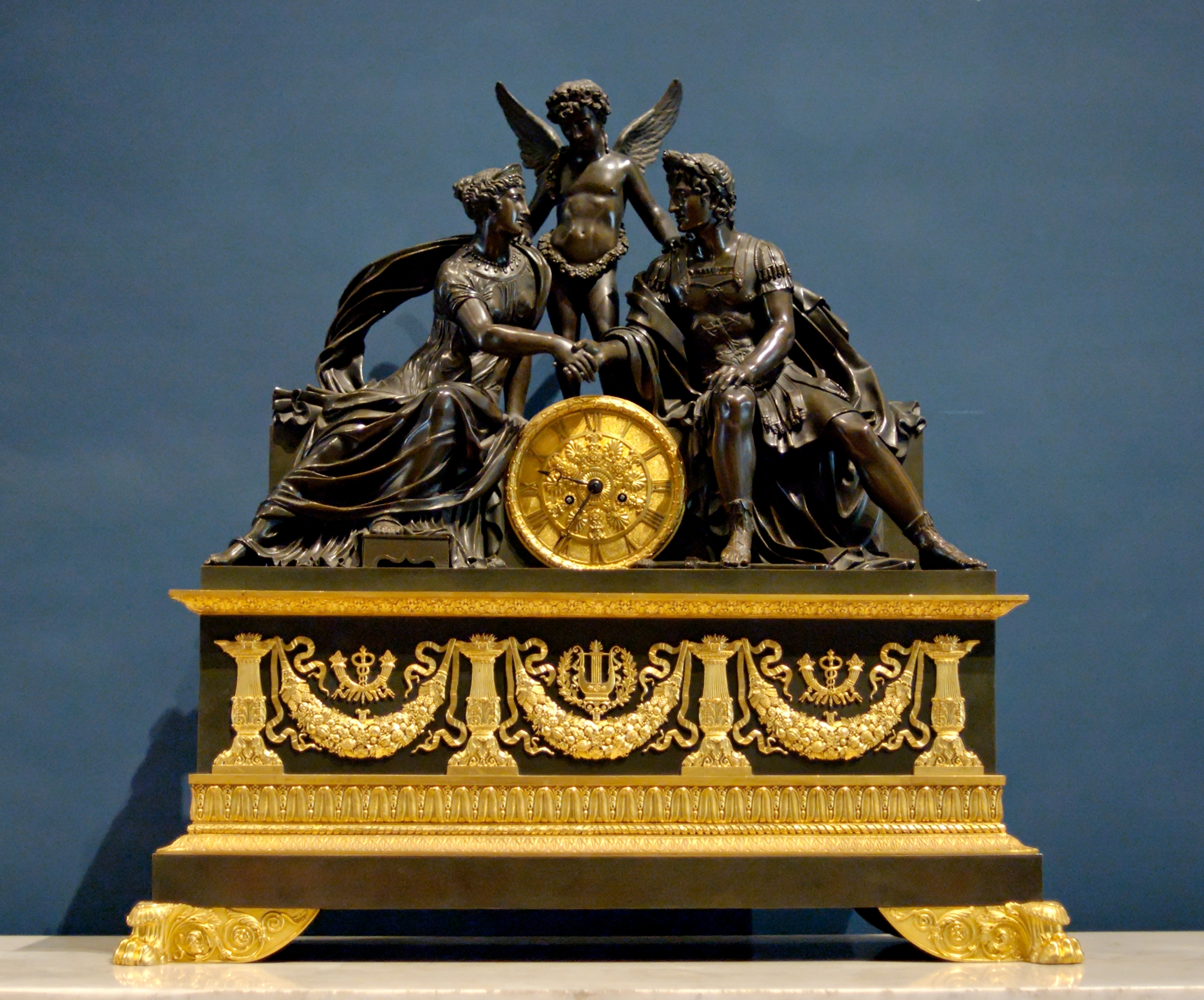
A French Empire mantel clock representing Mars and Venus, an allegory of the wedding of Napoleon I and Archduchess Marie Louise of Austria. By the famous bronzier Pierre-Philippe Thomire, ca. 1810

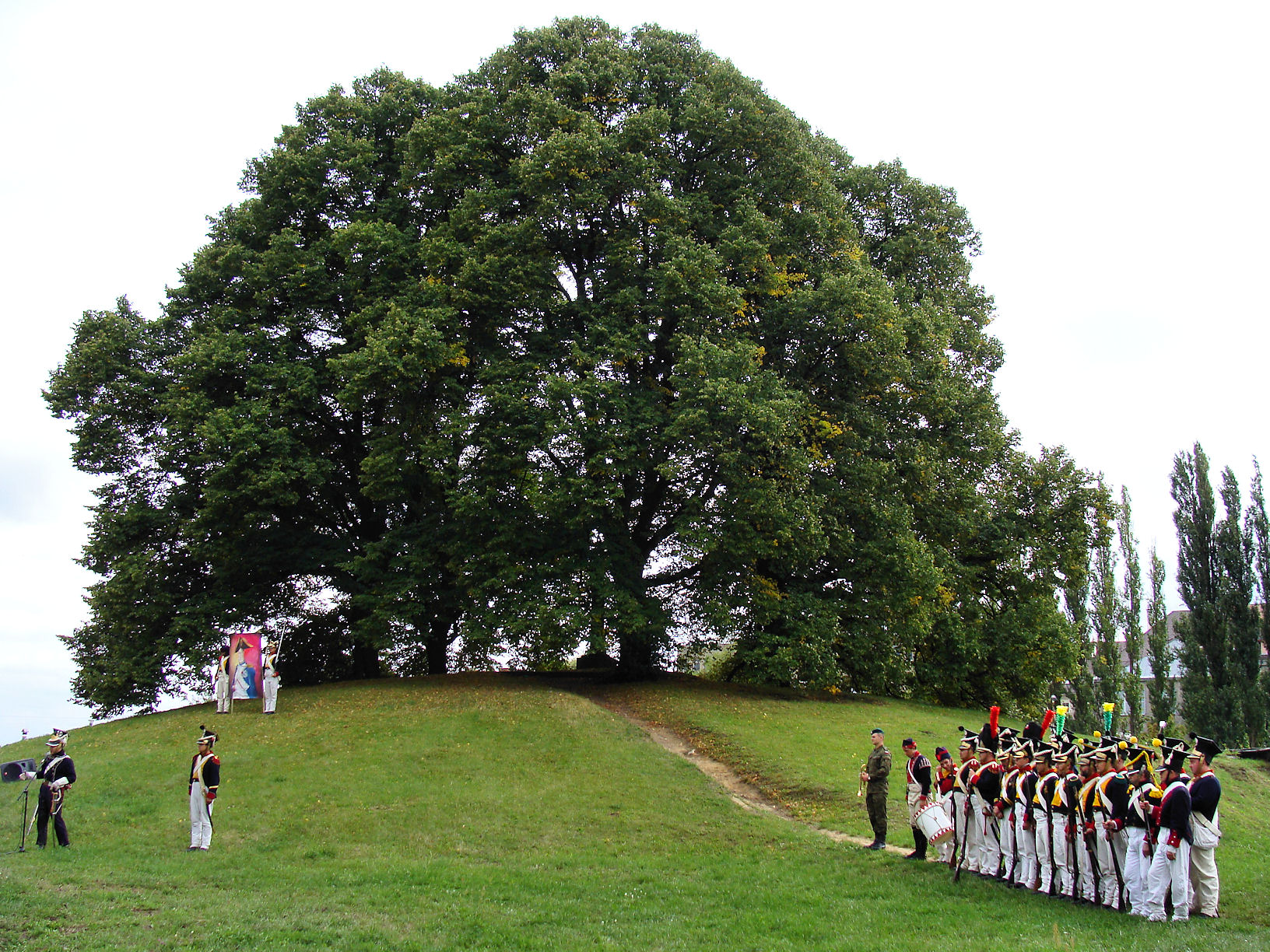
Celebration of the anniversary of the birth of Napoleon Bonaparte involving historical reenactment groups in uniforms from the Napoleonic period on Napoleon Hill in Szczecin, Poland, 2008

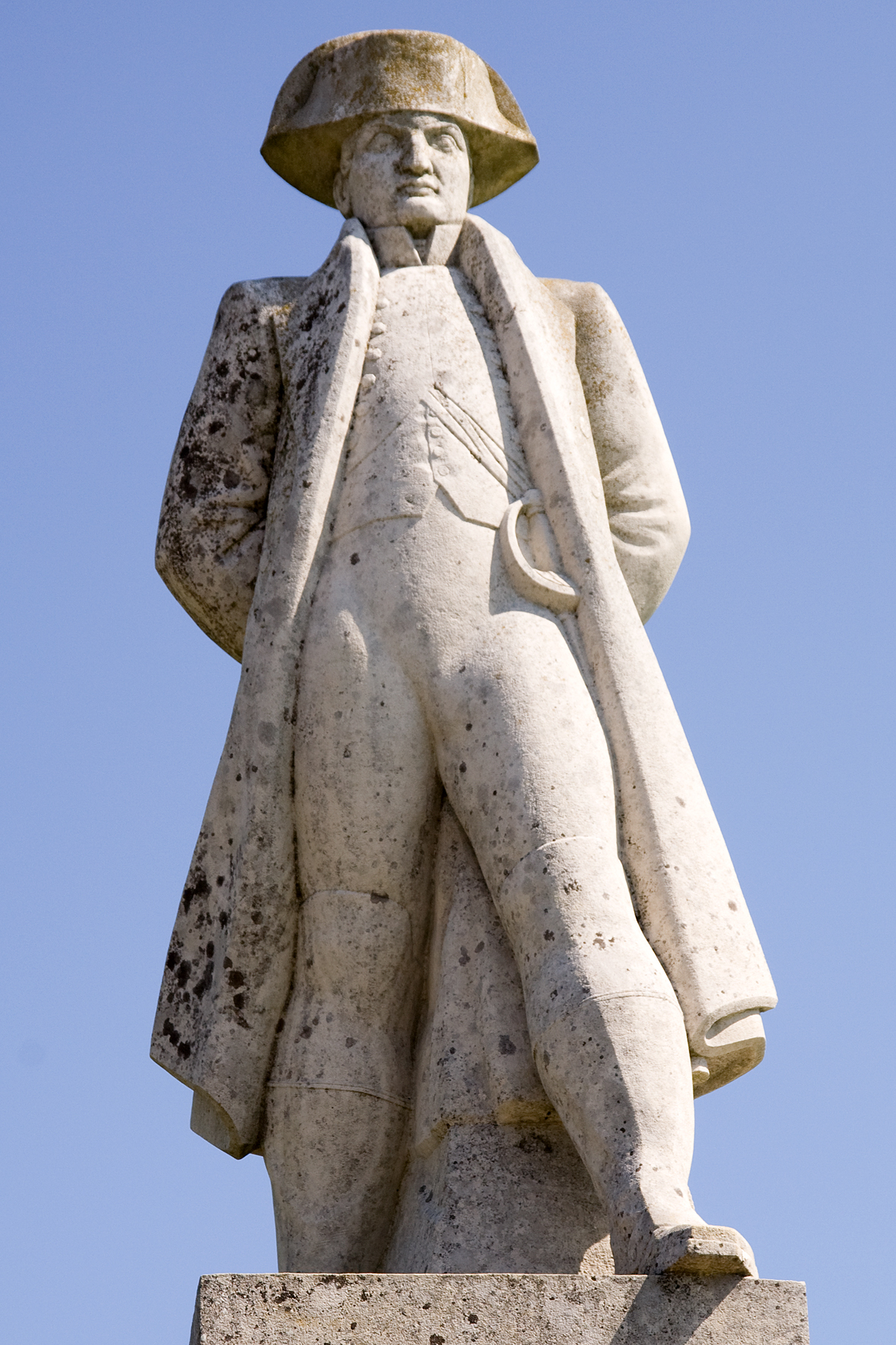
Monument Napoleon

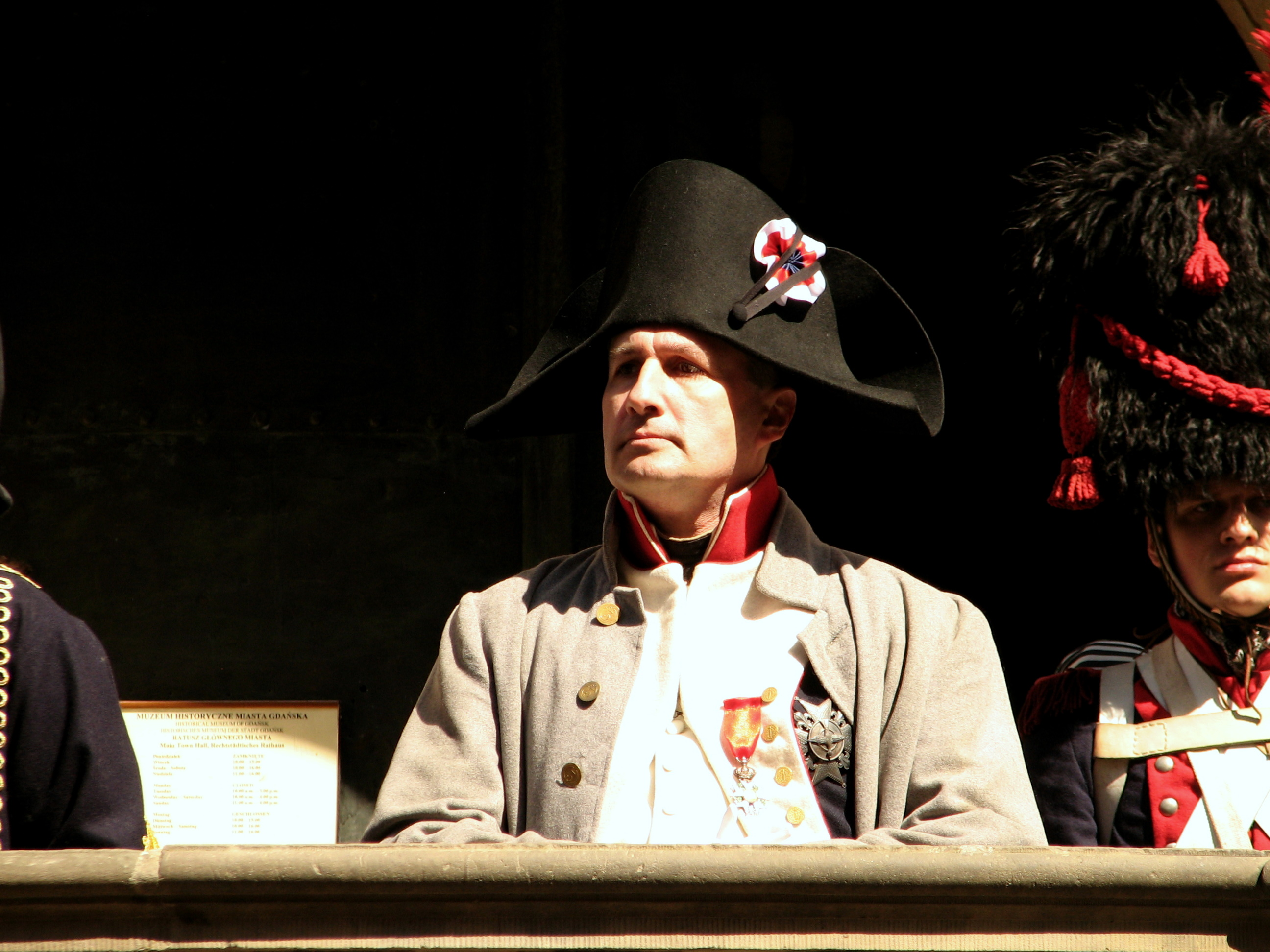
Cosplay of Napoleon

Napoleon I, Emperor of the French, has become a worldwide cultural icon generally associated with tactical brilliance, ambition, and political power. His distinctive features and costume have made him a very recognisable figure in popular culture. A major figure in history of France and Europe, Napoleon is known for the scope of his military conquests as well as his ultimate defeats. His two exiles provide further historical intrigue.

Napoleon has been portrayed in many works of fiction, his depiction varying greatly with the author's perception of the historical character. On the one hand, Napoleon has become a worldwide cultural icon who symbolises military genius and political power. For example, in the 1927 film Napoléon, young general Bonaparte is portrayed as a heroic visionary. On the other hand, he has often been reduced to a stock character and has frequently been depicted as a short and "petty tyrant", sometimes comically so.

== Origin and construction of the Napoleonic myth ==
Napoleon Bonaparte is the primary architect of his own legend. In his work "Napoléon journaliste," Antonin Périvier writes: "Bonaparte, and later Napoleon, directed all the publicity at his disposal solely towards himself and for his exclusive benefit". From the First Italian Campaign in 1797, he established propaganda in his favor by publishing bulletins in Italy intended to glorify his military actions and influence public opinion. On July 20, the "Courier of the Army of Italy" appeared, followed on August 10 by "France as Seen by the Army of Italy," and in Paris, the "Journal of Bonaparte and Virtuous Men," which was published under the initiative of his brothers Joseph and Lucien on February 19, 1797. In these publications, he highlighted his actions and commented on the political situation in France. They included dithyrambic epigraphs such as: in the Courier, "Bonaparte flies like lightning and strikes like thunder. He is everywhere and sees everything; he is the envoy of the great nation," and in the Journal of Bonaparte: "Hannibal slept in Capua, but the active Bonaparte does not sleep in Mantua". These newspapers and the propaganda they spread in France helped distinguish Bonaparte from other generals of the Republic and contributed to the rise of his popularity in public opinion.

Maurice Duverger emphasizes the importance of the propaganda orchestrated by Napoleon, the parades, and celebrations surrounding his victories in the functioning of his regime: the people and courtiers repeated that the rain would stop and the sun would appear when he showed himself. "Napoleon continues to fascinate all theorists of political power; is it not because his dictatorship appears singularly modern? His authority takes on a charismatic character that aligns with our modern cult of personality." This cult is widely propagated by the soldiers of the Grande Armée, who rely on the emperor in the most difficult moments, but also by the clergy, who, from the Concordat of 1801, present Napoleon as the envoy of providence.

== Fine art ==
Art contributes to the Napoleonic legend during the emperor's lifetime through propaganda paintings, sculptures, engravings, or prints by artists such as David or Antoine-Jean Gros, among others. Paintings created after Napoleon's life, or even long after his death, mostly express a nostalgia for France under Napoleon. For example, Édouard Detaille's "The Dream" (which is now in the Musée d'Orsay in Paris) depicted in a highly patriotic allegory French soldiers from 1870 sleeping, with the distant memory of the victorious Grande Armée in the clouds. This type of painting, showing nostalgia for a victorious and united France, is one of the foundations of the Napoleonic legend, as they all visually represent the increasingly distant memory of a mythical France.

== Literature and theatre ==
=== Literature ===
'The Memorial of Saint Helena,' a masterpiece of propaganda first published in 1823 (after Napoleon's death in 1821) by Emmanuel de Las Cases, revives the golden legend and lays the foundations of Bonapartism.

Famous novelist Honoré de Balzac illustrates the admiration of the French and many Europeans by writing in "A Conversation Between Eleven O'Clock and Midnight," an excerpt from "Contes Bruns": "Who will ever explain, depict, or understand Napoleon? A man represented with his arms folded, and who did everything, who was the greatest force ever known, the most concentrated, the most mordant, the most acid of all forces; a singular genius who carried armed civilization in every direction without fixing it anywhere; a man who could do everything because he willed everything; a prodigious phenomenon of will, conquering an illness by a battle, and yet doomed to die of disease in bed after living in the midst of ball and bullets; a man with a code and a sword in his brain, word and deed; a clear-sighted spirit that foresaw everything but his own fall; a capricious politician who risked men by handfuls out of economy, and who spared three heads—those of Talleyrand, of Pozzo de Borgo, and of Metternich, diplomatists whose death would have saved the French Empire, and who seemed to him of greater weight than thousands of soldiers; a man to whom nature, as a rare privilege, had given a heart in a frame of bronze; mirthful and kind at midnight amid women, and next morning manipulating Europe as a young girl might amuse herself by splashing water in her bath! Hypocritical and generous; loving tawdriness and simplicity; devoid of taste, but protecting the arts; and in spite of these antitheses, really great in everything by instinct or by temperament; Caesar at five-and-twenty, Cromwell at thirty; and then, like my grocer buried in Père Lachaise, a good husband and a good father. In short, he improvised public works, empires, kings, codes, verses, a romance—and all with more range than precision. Did he not aim at making all Europe France? And after making us weigh on the earth in such a way as to change the laws of gravitation, he left us poorer than on the day when he first laid hands on us; while he, who had taken an empire by his name, lost his name on the frontier of his empire in a sea of blood and soldiers. A man all thought and all action, who comprehended Desaix and Fouché."

Napoleon plays an indirect yet utterly important part in Alexandre Dumas' novel The Count of Monte Cristo. The novel starts in 1815 with Napoleon exiled on the island of Elba. Here we learn that he hands a letter to the protagonist Edmond Dantès to give to one of his chief (fictional) supporters in Paris - Noirtier De Villefort, the president of a Bonapartist club. Dantès is unaware that Villefort is an agent of the exiled Emperor and that the letter Napoleon handed him contained instructions and plans about Napoleon's planned return to Paris. Dantès' rivals include Mr. Danglars, his long-time unspoken rival and shipmate, who first reports Dantès to the authorities as a Bonapartist, and Gérard De Villefort, the opportunistic son of Noirtier and staunch royalist, who, in order to protect his father from being outed as a Bonapartist, burns the letter and uses its former existence to frame Dantès and have him imprisoned in the Château d'If until his escape after 14 years and seeks vengeance upon those who wronged him.

Napoleon features prominently in the BBC Doctor Who Past Doctor Adventure World Game, in which the Second Doctor must avert a plot to change history so that Napoleon is victorious. In an alternate timeline created by the assassination of the Duke of Wellington prior to Waterloo, Napoleon is persuaded to march on to Russia after the victory at Waterloo, but he dies shortly afterwards, his empire having become so overextended that the various countries collapse back into the separate nations they were before, thus degenerating into a state of perpetual warfare. (This situation is made worse due to the intervention of the Doctor's old enemies the Players).

Other depictions of Napoleon in literature include:

- Stanley from A Streetcar Named Desire invokes the Napoleonic Code while speaking with Blanche.
- The pig in Animal Farm who wrests control of Jones's farm from the other animals and becomes a tyrant is named Napoleon.
- Julien Sorel from The Red and the Black by Stendhal has to hide a portrait of Napoleon.
- Vengeance Is Mine (1899) by Andrew Balfour is a novel revolving around Napoleon's exploits during the Hundred Days and the Battle of Waterloo.
- Moreton Hall's novel General George (1903) focuses on the Pichegru Conspiracy plot to assassinate Napoleon.
- The Thunderer (1927) by L. Adams Beck (writing as "E. Barrington") is a historical novel revolving around the romance between Napoleon and Joséphine.
- St Helena (1936) by R. C. Sherriff
- So Great A Man (1937) by "David Pilgrim" (a pseudonym for John Palmer and Hilary St George Saunders) depicts Napoleon's life in the years 1808–1809.
- In Thomas B. Costain's historical novel The Last Love (1963), a dying Napoleon, banished to St. Helena, tells his story to his lone companion, a girl who acts as his English translator.
- Napoleon is an important character in Leo Tolstoy's War and Peace, where considerable space is devoted to Tolstoy's interpretation of his historical role. He consequently also appears in the adaptations and films of this novel, listed in the following section.
- Napoleon appears briefly in the first section of Victor Hugo's Les Misérables, and is extensively referenced in later sections.
- Noel B. Gerson's novel Emperor's Ladies (1959) focuses on Napoleon's marriage to Marie Louise of Austria.
- Bernard Cornwell's novel Sharpe's Devil features a meeting between Napoleon and the fictional Richard Sharpe.
- He is featured in the manga Eikou no Napoleon – Eroica, written by manga artist Riyoko Ikeda.
- C. S. Forester's Hornblower series of novels are mostly set during the Napoleonic Wars, in particular book 9 of the series, Commodore Hornblower focusing on the French invasion of Russia and the subsequent defence of Riga from the period of 1812 onwards, and book 10 Lord Hornblower dealing with events in France up to the defeat of Napoleon by the Duke of Wellington at Waterloo.
- Napoleon is a main character in Ruth McKenney's novel Mirage (1956), set during the campaign in Egypt.
- Napoleon is one of the two main characters in Simon Scarrow's The Revolution Quartet, which details Napoleon's life from his birth to his defeat at the Battle of Waterloo alongside that of Arthur Wellesley's.
- In an Archie comic story featuring Jughead Jones, he is inadvertently transported by ambulance to a mental hospital. At first he protests, but relents upon hearing how well the patients are fed. When a nurse asks for his name, he replies "Napoleon Bonaparte." A later update changed this to him saying "You know who I am, Sonic! I am the genius, Dr. Robotnik!"
- H. Beam Piper's short story He Walked Around the Horses features a parallel universe in which both the American Revolution and the French Revolution were suppressed. Consequently, Napoleon does not rise to power and the Napoleonic Wars never take place. In 1809, he is described by a British general named Sir Arthur Wellesley as being a Colonel of Artillery in the French Army and a brilliant tactician whose loyalty to the French monarchy has never been questioned.
- The collection If, or History Rewritten assembles numerous alternate history essays written in the first four decades of the 20th century. Napoleon has varying roles in many of them.
- Elvira Woodruff's Dear Napoleon, I Know You're Dead, But... (Holiday House, 1992), illus. Noah and Jess Woodruff OCLC 25281797 is a novel about a boy who writes letters to Napoleon.
- Harry Turtledove's Alternate Generals anthology series have at least two stories based on the idea of Napoleon emigrating during the Reign of Terror. In volume 1's The Last Crusader by Bill Fawcett, he joined the Church and became a Cardinal in Rome; by the early 1810s he is a spiritual leader of the Allies who seek to overthrow the French Republic. In volume 2's Empire by William Sanders, he formed an independent Empire based in Louisiana; with his lieutenants Andrew Jackson and Davy Crockett he fights a valiant but doomed war against the British, vaguely analogous to the War of 1812.
- Napoleon is a character in Treason's Tide by Robert Wilton, published in February 2013 by Corvus, an imprint of Atlantic Books; it is set during the summer of 1805. This novel was originally issued in June 2011 as The Emperor's Gold.
- In the alternate history novel Napoleon in America (2014) by Shannon Selin, Napoleon escapes from St. Helena and winds up in the United States in 1821.
- Jonathan Strange & Mr Norrell by Susanna Clarke takes place partially during the Napoleonic Wars, and features Jonathan Strange fighting in Spain, and also plaguing Napoleon with nightmares. Lord Wellington also plays a large part in this novel.
- Javier Sierra's novel La Pirámide Inmortal deals with an apocryphal story about Napoleon spending a whole night in the Great Pyramid of Giza.
- Mary "Jacky" Faber, in the Bloody Jack series of novels, meets Napoleon in My Bonny Light Horseman, having infiltrated Napoleon's armies as a British spy.
- Napoleon appears as a minor character in the Grimm novel The Icy Touch.
- In The Queen's Fortune: A Novel of Desiree, Napoleon, and the Dynasty that Outlived the Empire (2020), by Allison Pataki, Napoleon plays a prominent role in the story of his first fiancée, Désirée Clary.
- In Grandville (2009–2014) by Bryan Talbot, France won the Napoleonic Wars and invaded Britain, and the world is populated mostly by anthropomorphic animals. Britain eventually regains its independence after a long campaign of civil disobedience and anarchist bombings, the Bonaparte Dynasty rules the empire until Emperor Napoleon XII is killed by Detective Inspector Archibald LeBrock of Scotland Yard when he discovers the Emperor is part of a conspiracy to reconquer Britain in order to steal its oil.

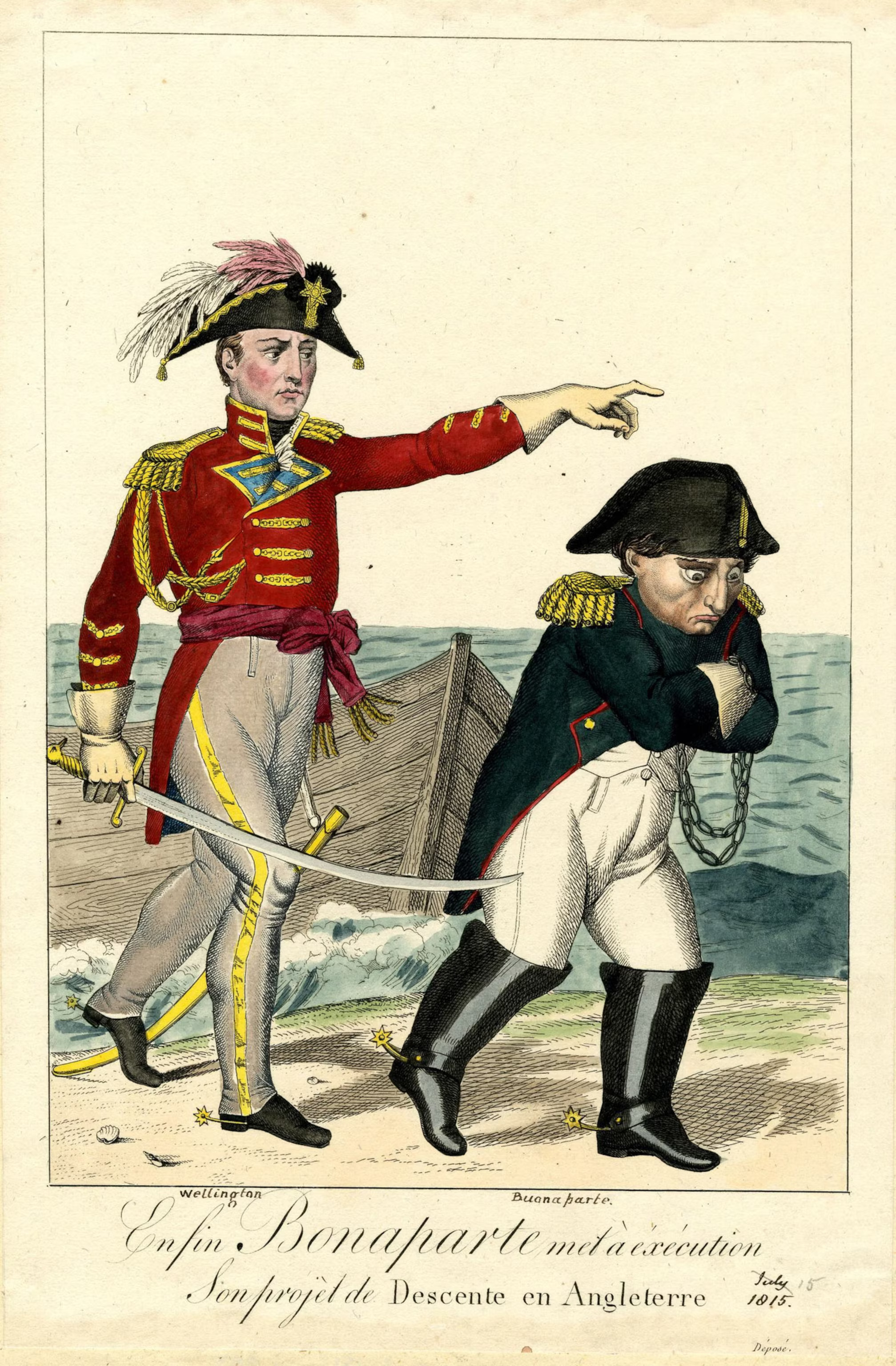
1815 French cartoon depicting the Duke of Wellington ordering Napoleon into exile

=== Theatre ===
- Madame Sans-Gêne is a 1893 historical comedy-drama play by Victorien Sardou and Émile Moreau, concerning incidents in the life of Catherine Hübscher, an outspoken 18th-century laundress who did laundry for young Napoleon and later became the Duchess of Danzig.
- The Man of Destiny is an 1897 play by George Bernard Shaw, set in Italy during the early career of Napoleon.
- St Helena: a play in twelve scenes is a 1936 play by R. C. Sherriff and Jeanne de Casalis, which deals with the exile of Napoleon on Saint Helena.
- The 1936 operetta Kaiserin Josephine by Emmerich Kálmán focuses on the trials of the relationship between Napoleon and his first wife Joséphine de Beauharnais.
- In 1988 Japanese musical production War and Peace by Takarazuka Revue Napoleon was played by Tajima Kumi and Amachi Hikari.
- Musical Napoleon by Timothy Williams and Andrew Sabiston premiered in 1994. In 1994 Canadian production Napoleon was played by Jerome Pradon, in 2000 London production he was played by Paul Baker and Uwe Kröger.
- In 2013, Applied Mechanics produced Vainglorious, an epic, 26-actor immersive performance with Mary Tuomanen portraying Napoleon.
- In 2014 Japanese musical production Napoleon: The Man Who Never Sleeps by Takarazuka Revue Napoleon was played by Yuzuki Reon and Rei Makoto.
- In 2018 production Napoleon by Stanley Kubrick (The Greatest Movie Never Made) adapted from Stanley Kubrick’s screenplay for stage Napoleon was played by David Serero

== Computer and video games ==
- The campaigns of Napoleon have been depicted in the sixth installment of the Total War series, Napoleon: Total War. Players have a chance to follow Napoleon's Italian, Egyptian, or European campaigns.
- Napoleon is featured in Assassin's Creed Unity as a supporting character. He also appears as the main antagonist in its downloadable content mission, Dead Kings.
- Napoleon is a frequently used leader representing the French civilisation in the Civilization series.
- Napoleon appears in Scribblenauts and its sequels as someone the player can summon.
- The first expansion pack to Europa Universalis III, Napoleon's Ambition, bears his name and expands the game to cover his whole reign.
- The game Mount & Blade: Warband features an expansion pack called Napoleonic Wars where the player can compete online as a soldier from one of many countries involved in the Napoleonic Wars.
- Napoleon appears in the mobile game Fate/Grand Order as an Archer-class servant.
- Napoleon is a real-time strategy game that was released in 2001 for the Game Boy Advance. It was one of the console's launch titles in Japan and only saw international release in France under the title L'Aigle de Guerre.
- Napoleon appears in the mobile visual novel game Ikemen Vampire by Cybird as one of the dateable characters.
- Napoleon appears in Psychonauts. In the game, he is portrayed as a figment of his descendant Fred's mind. He manifests within Fred's mind annoyed that Fred is a Bonaparte yet can't win a simple war game, and forces Fred to play until Raz helps him win.
- Napoleon is featured in the 2018 role-playing game The Council as a supporting character.
- Napoleon appears in the 2012 3DS game Rhythm Thief & the Emperor's Treasure as the overarching antagonist of the story.
- Empoleon, a Pokémon introduced in the 2006 Nintendo DS game Pokémon Diamond and Pearl, is named after Napoleon in multiple languages.

== Culinary ==
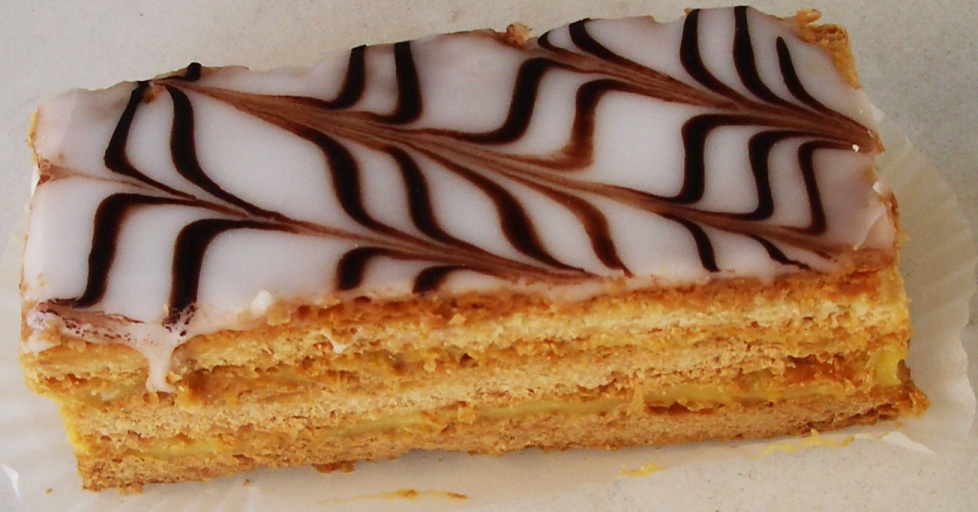
Mille-feuille

- Beef Napoleon
- Bigarreau Napoleon cherry
- Bonaparte's Ribs, an early 19th-century English lollipop
- Eggplant Napoleon
- Napoléons
- Seattle-based food brokerage and import firm The Napoleon Company

== Film, radio and television ==
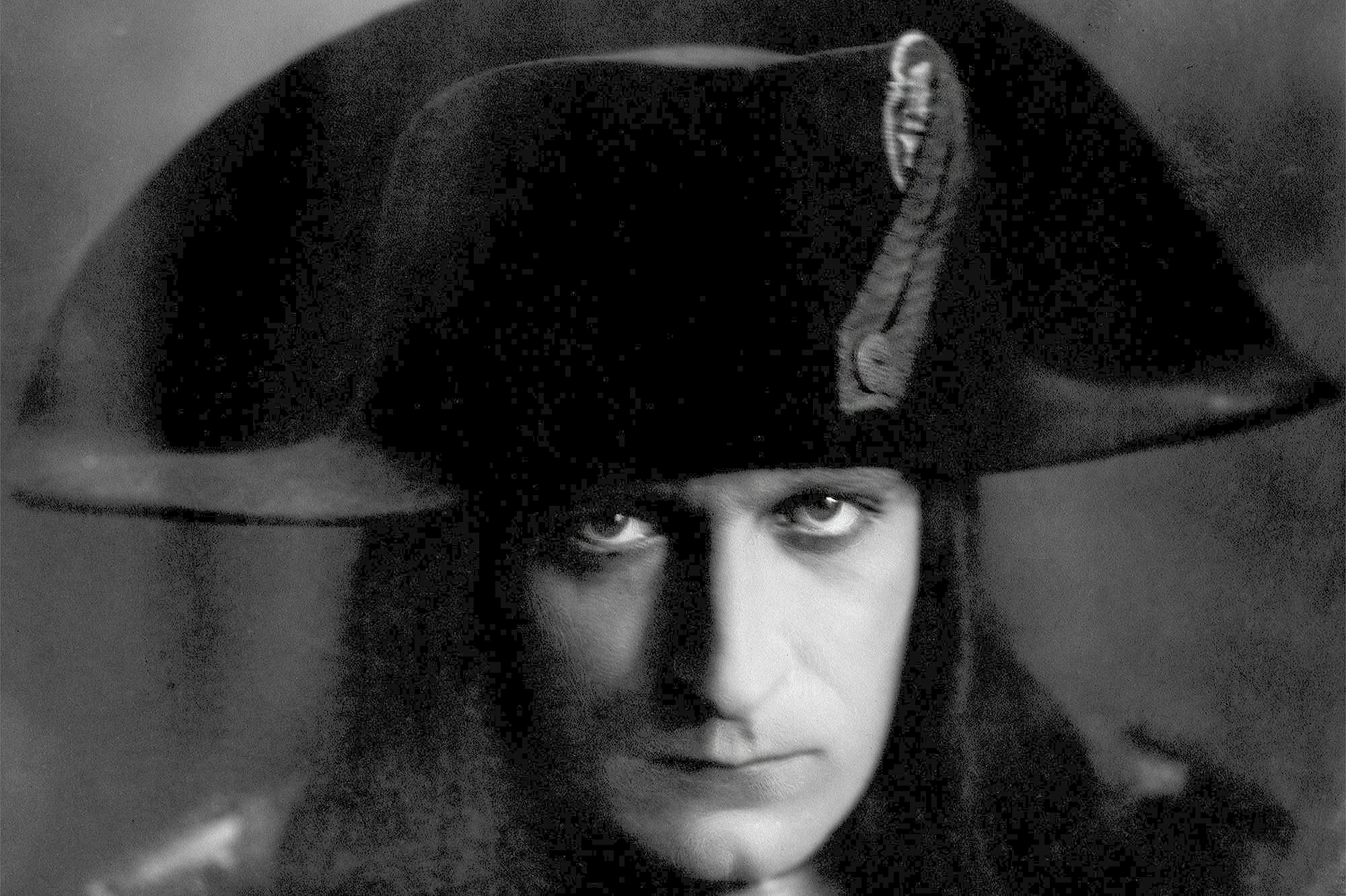
Albert Dieudonné as Napoleon in Napoléon

=== Film ===
- Entrevue de Napoléon et du Pape (1897)
- Napoleon, the Man of Destiny (1908), played by William Humphrey
- Napoleon and the Empress Josephine (1909), played by William Humphrey
- 1812 (1912), played by Pavel Knorr
- The Eaglet (1913), played by Emile Chautard
- The Battle of Waterloo (1913), played by Ernest Batley
- Countess Walewska (1914), played by Stefan Jaracz
- Madame Récamier (1920), played by Ferdinand von Alten
- The Duke of Reichstadt (1920), played by Rainer Simons
- Napoleon's Daughter (1922), played by Ludwig Hartau
- A Royal Divorce (1923), played by Gwylim Evans
- Napoléon (1927), played by Albert Dieudonné
- Queen Louise (1927), played by Charles Vanel
- Lützow's Wild Hunt (1927), played by Paul Bildt
- The Fighting Eagle (1927), played by Max Barwyn
- Glorious Betsy (1928), played by Pasquale Amato
- Napoleon at Saint Helena (1929), played by Werner Krauss
- Louise, Queen of Prussia (1931), played by Paul Gunther
- The Eaglet (1931), played by Émile Drain
- The Congress Dances (1931), played by Ernst Stahl-Nachbaur
- Marshal Forwards (1932), played by Alfred Durra
- Invitation to the Waltz (1935), played by Esme Percy
- Hundred Days (1935), played by Werner Krauss
- Hearts Divided (1936), played by Claude Rains
- The Night With the Emperor (1936), played by Hans Zesch-Ballot
- The Pearls of the Crown (1937), played by Émile Drain and Jean-Louis Barrault
- A Royal Divorce (1938), played by Pierre Blanchar
- Conquest (1938), played by Charles Boyer
- The Boarders at Saint-Cyr (1939), played by Luigi Carini
- The Fire Devil (1940), played by Erich Ponto
- Le Destin fabuleux de Désirée Clary (1942), played by Jean-Louis Barrault
- The Young Mr. Pitt (1942), played by Herbert Lom
- Kutuzov (1943), played by Semyon Mezhinsky
- Kolberg (1945), played by Charles Schauten
- Pamela (1945), played by Jean Chaduc
- The Lame Devil (1948), played by Émile Drain
- Encounter with Werther (1949), played by Paul Dahlke
- Napoleone (1951), played by Renato Rascel
- Scaramouche (1952), played by Aram Katcher (uncredited)
- Attack from the Sea (1953), played by Valeriy Lekarev
- Désirée (1954), played by Marlon Brando. Laurence Olivier was impressed by Brando's interpretation of Napoleon, praising on The Dick Cavett Show that, "[It], I think, was immeasurably the best ever Napoleon [...] I have ever seen. Simply marvelous, simply because of his own particular quality of being so easy, so easily bringing a sense of genius to a character who was a genius."
- Loves of Three Queens (1954), played by Gérard Oury
- Royal Affairs in Versailles (1954), played by Émile Drain
- Napoleon (1955), played by Daniel Gélin and Raymond Pellegrin
- Queen Louise (1957), played by René Deltgen
- The Story of Mankind (1957), played by Dennis Hopper
- Austerlitz (1960), played by Pierre Mondy
- Napoleon II, the Eaglet (1961), played by Jean-Marc Thibault
- Imperial Venus (1962), played by Raymond Pellegrin
- The Ashes (1965), played by Janusz Zakrzeński
- Waterloo (1970), played by Rod Steiger
- Eagle in a Cage (1972), played by Kenneth Haigh
- Love and Death (1975), played by James Tolkan
- The Loves and Times of Scaramouche (1976), played by Aldo Maccione
- Time Bandits (1981), played by Ian Holm
- Adieu Bonaparte (1985), played by Patrice Chéreau
- Bill & Ted's Excellent Adventure (1989), played by Terry Camilleri
- Quills (2000), played by Ron Cook
- The Emperor's New Clothes (2001), played by Ian Holm
- Monsieur N. (2003), played by Philippe Torreton
- Napoleon and Me (2006), played by Daniel Auteuil
- Night at the Museum: Battle of the Smithsonian (2009), played by Alain Chabat
- The Ballad of Uhlans (2012), played by Eric Fratichelli
- Toussaint Louverture (2012), played by Thomas Langmann
- Vasilisa (2014), played by Vitaliy Kovalenko
- Union of Salvation (2019), played by Pierre Bourel
- Napoleon (2023), played by Joaquin Phoenix

Napoleon is referenced in:

- The Furies: T.C. likens himself to Napoleon and keeps a bust of him in his office.
- The Swan: Beatrix is mortified to find Napoleon's name on Nicolas's blackboard; he later proposes a toast to Napoleon.

==== The Count of Monte Cristo adaptations ====
- The Count of Monte Cristo (1912), played by George Hernandez
- The Count of Monte Cristo (1934), played by Paul Irving
- The Count of Monte Cristo (1954), played by Julien Bertheau
- The Count of Monte Cristo (2002), played by Alex Norton

==== Madame Sans-Gêne adaptations ====
- Madame Sans-Gêne (1911), played by Edmond Duquesne
- Napoleon and the Little Washerwoman (1920), played by Rudolf Lettinger
- Madame Sans-Gêne (1925), played by Émile Drain
- Madame Sans-Gêne (1941), played by Albert Dieudonné
- Madame Sans-Gêne (1945), played by Eduardo Cuitiño
- Madame (1961), played by Julien Bertheau

==== War and Peace adaptations ====
- War and Peace (1915), played by Vladimir Gardin
- War and Peace (1956), played by Herbert Lom
- War and Peace (1968), played by Vladislav Strzhelchik

=== Radio ===
- His Father's Sword (BBC Regional Programme, 1937), portrayed by Terence De Marney
- The Dynasts (three-part series) (BBC Home Service, 1943), portrayed by Malcolm Keen
- The Dynasts (six-part series) (BBC Third Programme, 1951), portrayed by Robert Harris
- The Adventures of the Scarlet Pimpernel: "The Vicomte De Villier is to be Executed" and "New Recruits are Needed by the League" (NBC, 1952–53), actor unknown at this time. He is also prominently mentioned in the episode "The Ghosts of Martin's Folly".
- Children's Hour: "The House of the Pelican" (six-part serial) (BBC Home Service, 1954), portrayed by Robert Harris
- England's Harrowing (two-part series) (BBC Third Programme, 1960), portrayed by Malcolm Keen
- Animal Grab: "La Foire d'Empoigne" (BBC Third Programme, 1962), portrayed by Malcolm Keen
- Napoleon in Love (BBC Radio 4, 1969), portrayed by Marius Goring
- Five Morning Comedies: "Keep Your Hands Off My War" (BBC Radio 4, 1970), portrayed by Clive Swift
- The Dynasts (seven-part series) (BBC Home Service, 1970), portrayed by Maurice Denham
- St. Helena (BBC Radio 4, 1972), portrayed by Lee Montague
- Midweek Theatre: "Eagle and Spider" (BBC Radio 4, 1973), portrayed by Cyril Shaps
- The Day of Destiny (BBC Radio 4, 1974), portrayed by Barry Foster
- Napoleon Aboard HMS Bellerophon (BBC Radio 4, 1975), portrayed by Cyril Shaps
- Vanity Fair (ten-part serial) (BBC Radio 4, 1978), portrayed by Harold Kasket
- The Man of Destiny (BBC Radio 4, 1981), portrayed by David Suchet
- Thirty-Minute Theatre: "Shaggy Sokolov" (BBC Radio 3, 1984), portrayed by Michael Graham Cox
- Betsy and Napoleon (BBC Radio 4, 2005), portrayed by Alex Jennings
- Napoleon Rising (BBC Radio 3, 2012), portrayed by Toby Jones
- Tsar - "Alexander I: Into the Woods" (BBC Radio 4, 2017), portrayed by Charlie Anson
- Billy Ruffian (BBC Radio 4, 2018), portrayed by Adrian Scarborough

=== Television ===
- The Love Story of Napoleon (US, 1953), played by James Mason
- How the Brigadier Won His Medals (1954), played by Booth Colman
- The Reign of Terror, eighth serial of Doctor Who (1964), Doctor Who's companions Ian and Barbara overhear Barras conspiring with a young general, Napoleon Bonaparte (Tony Wall), in the indictment and overthrow of Robespierre.
- I Dream of Jeannie: "My Master, Napoleon's Buddy" (1967), Jeannie sends Tony back in time to advise Napoleon (Aram Katcher), who suspects Tony of being a spy and plans to execute him.
- Bewitched: "Samantha's French Pastry" (1968), Uncle Arthur tries to conjure up a French pastry, but instead conjures up Napoleon, played by Henry Gibson.
- Dad's Army: "A Soldier's Farewell" (1972), a soldier (Arthur Lowe) dreams he is Napoleon at the Battle of Waterloo.
- Amoureuse Joséphine (France, 1974), played by Pierre Arditi
- Napoleon and Love (UK, 1974), played by Ian Holm
- Joséphine ou la comédie des ambitions (France, 1979), played by Daniel Mesguich
- Napoléon and Joséphine: A Love Story (US, 1987), played by Armand Assante
- Napoleon (Napoléon et l'Europe) (France, 1991), played by Jean-François Stévenin
- Scarlet and Black (UK, 1993), played by Christopher Fulford
- Sharpe's Honour (1994), played by Ron Cook.
- Sharpe, "Sharpe's Waterloo" (1997): Sharpe glimpses Napoleon as he rides off in defeat. The actor who plays Napoleon is uncredited.
- Blackadder: Back & Forth (1999), played by Simon Russell Beale
- Jack of All Trades (2000): Napoléon is a recurring character played by (Verne Troyer).
- Napoléon (France-Canada, 2002), played by Christian Clavier.
- Horrible Histories (UK, 2009–2015), played by Jim Howick
- Deadliest Warrior, Season 3 (2011): Napoleon squares off against George Washington.
- El ministerio del tiempo (2015–2020), played by Fernando Cayo.
- DC's Legends of Tomorrow: Season 5, Episode 5 "A Head of her Time" (2020), Napoleon is played by Kazz Leskard.
- Succession, "Connor's Wedding" (2023): Logan tells Roman he and Kerry sent Connor letters written between Napoleon and Joséphine.
- Carême (France, 2025), played by Franck Molinaro.
- Alexander I (Russia, 2025), played by Yuriy Chursin.

==== Man of Destiny adaptations ====
- Man of Destiny (UK, 1939), played by Henry Oscar
- Man of Destiny (Australia, 1963), played by Edward Hepple
- Man of Destiny (Australia, 1967), played by Brian Hannan
- Man of Destiny (US, 1973), played by Stacy Keach
- Man of Destiny (UK, 1981), played by Simon Callow

==== War and Peace adaptations ====
- Episode War and Peace (UK,1963) of Play of the Week drama anthology series, played by Kenneth Griffith.
- War and Peace (UK, 1972), played by David Swift
- War and Peace (France/Italy, 2007), played by Scali Delpeyrat
- War and Peace (UK, 2016), played by Mathieu Kassovitz

=== Documentaries ===
- Napoléon (2000), PBS documentary series narrated by David McCullough.
- Episode Napoleon's Final Battle from National Geographic docudrama series "Icons of Power" (2006), exploring the course of Napoleon's 100 Days - the period during which Napoleon escaped from exile and marched on Paris to conquer Europe once again. Young Napoleon is played by Philippe Nevo, Napoleon is played by Vasile Muraru.
- "Napoleon" (2007), an episode of Heroes and Villains docudrama series, played by Tom Burke
- Secrets of History: Did Napoleon die of poisoning? (France, 2007), part of the Secrets d'Histoire series, explores Napoleon's death. Documentary presented by Stéphane Bern
- Secrets of History: Napoleon and Women (France, 2008), part of the Secrets d'Histoire series, explores Napoleon's relationships with his mother, his marriages to Joséphine de Beauharnais and Marie-Louise of Austria, his mistresses. Documentary presented by Stéphane Bern.
- Die Deutschen: Season 1, Episode 7 Napoleon und die Deutschen ('Napoleon and the Germans', Germany, 2008).
- Secrets of History: How do you become Napoleon? (France, 2015), part of the Secrets d'Histoire series, explores Napoleon's life and rise to power. Documentary presented by Stéphane Bern.
- Napoleon (2015), BBC documentary presented by Andrew Roberts.
- Napoleon: The Russian Campaign (Napoléon: la Campagne de Russie)(France, 2015), ZED French docudrama series - Napoleon played by Marc Duret.
- Waterloo: The Last Battle (France, 2015) documentary - Napoleon played by Michel Schillaci.
- Secrets of History: Napoleon, exiled on St. Helena (France, 2021), part of the Secrets d'Histoire series, explores six last years of Napoleon's life. Documentary presented by Stéphane Bern.
- Napoleon: Destiny and Death (Napoléon, la destinée et la mort)(France, 2021), documentary exploring Napoleon’s obsession with fate and his repeated brushes with the grim reaper and how he forged the image of an invincible being.
- Napoleon: In the Name of Art (Napoleone - Nel nome dell'arte)(Italy, 2021) documentary, hosted by Jeremy Irons, exploring the complex relationship between Napoleon, culture and art.
- Napoleon's Last Battle (2025), BBC documentary, exploring the last days of Napoleon's life in exile on St Helena - Napoleon played by Kenneth Colley.

=== Animation ===
- Napoleon Bunny-Part (1956): Napoleon (voiced by Mel Blanc) matches wits with Bugs Bunny.
- Minions (2015): one of the Minions' former masters was Napoleon
- Clone High: Napoleon is a recurring character; Abe Lincoln claims he has a Napoleon complex.
- Fairly OddBaby: Jorgen Von Strangle proposes the name "Napoléon" for Poof The Baby.
- Time Squad, "Napoléon the Conquered": Napoleon is forced to take care of the house after Joséphine takes up fine arts.
- Histeria!: Napoleon is a recurring character who speaks like Hervé Villechaize.
- Robot Chicken: "Napoléon Bonamite", the character is a cross between Bonaparte and Napoleon Dynamite.
- Yu-Gi-Oh! GX: Jéan-Louis Bonaparte is based on the cliché of Napoleon.

== Places ==
=== Geography ===
- Many avenues, boulevards, bridges, monuments, and streets in Europe are named after Napoleon.
- Bonaparte, Iowa
- Fort Napoléon, les Saintes
- Napoleon, Indiana
- Napoleon, Michigan
- Napoleon, Missouri
- Napoleon, Ohio
- Napoleonville, Louisiana
- Route Napoléon

=== Hospitality ===
- Hôtel Napoléon
- Napoleon House, opened by Nicholas Girod as a plot to provide refuge for the exiled Napoleon
- Restaurants throughout the world are named after Napoleon.

== Military ==
- Fort Napoléon des Saintes
- Fort Napoleon, Ostend
- French ship Napoléon
- Napoléon-class ship of the line
- Operation Napoleon/Saline

== Music ==
- During the Napoleonic Wars, a nursery rhyme warned children that Napoleon ravenously ate naughty people.
- Ludwig van Beethoven had originally conceived of dedicating his Third Symphony to Consul Napoleon Bonaparte. Beethoven admired the ideals of the French Revolution, and Napoleon as their embodiment. According to Beethoven's pupil, F. Ries, when Napoleon proclaimed himself Emperor in May 1804, Beethoven became disgusted and went to the table where the completed score lay. He took hold of the title-page and tore it up in rage.
- Napoleon was the topic of many sea shanties following his death, most notably the song "Boney was a Warrior."
- A poem by the German poet Heinrich Heine, published in 1822 and titled "Die Grenadiere," or "Die beiden Grenadiere" ("The Two Grenadiers"), evokes the fascination exerted by the French Emperor on his men.
- Hector Berlioz composed his "Te Deum" in his honor in 1849.
- The Ani DiFranco song "Napoleon" satirises the desire to continuously "conquer"; more specifically musicians who sign with big labels, thus employing "an army of suits" in order to "make a killing" rather than just "make a living".
- The Bob Dylan song "On the Road Again" from his 1965 album Bringing It All Back Home references Napoleon: "Your mama she's hidin' inside the icebox/Your daddy walks in wearin' a Napoleon Bonaparte mask".
- Another Bob Dylan song, "Like a Rolling Stone", from his seminal album Highway 61 Revisited references Napoleon: "You used to be so amused/At Napoleon in rags and the language that he used".
- The Kinks song "Powerman" from their 1970 album Lola Versus Powerman and the Moneygoround, Part One references Napoleon: "People tried to conquer the world; Napoleon and Genghis Khan, Hitler tried and Mussolini too".
- The Bee Gees song "Walking Back to Waterloo" from their 1971 album Trafalgar references Napoleon: "I wish there was another year, another time/When people sang and poems rhymed/My name could be Napoleon".
- Swedish Pop group ABBA won the Eurovision Song Contest 1974 with the song "Waterloo", which uses the battle as a metaphor for a person surrendering to love similar to how Napoleon "surrendered" [sic] at Waterloo.
- The Al Stewart song "The Palace of Versailles", from his 1978 album Time Passages, is filled with references and allusions to the French Revolution. One line specifically references Napoleon: "Bonaparte is coming/With his army from the south".
- The Charlie Sexton song "Impressed" references Napoleon and Joséphine (from Pictures for Pleasure).
- The Mark Knopfler song "Done with Bonaparte" from his 1996 album Golden Heart is sung from the viewpoint of a soldier in Napoleon's army. The song recalls the soldier's many battles serving in Napoleon's Grande Armée.
- The Tori Amos song "Josephine" from her 1999 album To Venus and Back is sung from the viewpoint of Napoleon during his unsuccessful invasion of Russia.
- Iced Earth released the song "Waterloo" on their album The Glorious Burden, which details Napoleon's defeat at the Battle Of Waterloo.
- Bright Eyes recorded a song called "Napoleon's Hat" for Lagniappe, an album released by Saddle Creek Records to raise funds for the Red Cross' Hurricane Katrina relief efforts.
- The song "Viva la Vida" by Coldplay is loosely based on Napoleon's reign.
- An episode of Epic Rap Battles of History is a rap battle between Napoleon Bonaparte and Napoleon Dynamite. Six seasons later, Napoleon would come back for a battle against Charlemagne.
- Bonaparte is the stage name of German-Swiss singer/producer Tobias Jundt.
- In 2012, British synth-pop duo Pet Shop Boys released a song called Hell, which mentions various famous people who have made a name for themselves in history through acts of violence, including Napoleon.
- The Sabaton song "I, Emperor", from their 2025 album Legends, is written from Napoleon's viewpoint.

== Comics ==
Although no masterpieces have emerged from the Napoleonic adventure in the realm of comics or bandes dessinées, unlike painting or cinema, the comic book remains an art form quite inspired by the character of Napoleon. Notable works dedicated to the Emperor include those by Roger Lécureux and Guido Buzzelli, which recount Napoleon's entire life in a realistic drawing style and with great sobriety in the storyline. Other comics of the same genre narrate the life or periods of Napoleon's life, such as "Napoléon Bonaparte" by Guy Hempey (script) and Pierre Brochard (artwork), as well as the three albums in the series "Napoléon" by Belgians Liliane Funcken and Fred Funcken: "The Sultan of Fire," "The Fall of the Eagle," and "Waterloo (Battle) (1815)."

However, the myth of Napoleon is often caricatured, featuring megalomaniacs who believe themselves to be the Emperor. This is the case with Jean-Marc Rochette, who achieved certain commercial and critical success (winning awards at the Angoulême International Comics Festival) with "Napoléon et Bonaparte," which tells the burlesque adventures of two madmen, both believing themselves to be the famous military leader. Also worth mentioning, in the realm of comedy, is the work of Gotlib, who featured Napoleon Bonaparte in his "Rubrique-à-brac," as well as the series "Godaille et Godasse," which depicts his family stories.

== Other ==
- Automotive: Bugatti Royale Coupé Napoléon
- Interior Design: Napoleon line of stoves, grills, fireplaces, and HVAC systems
- Ornithology: Bonaparte's parakeet
- Toys: Napoleonic toys

== Recurring themes and stereotypes in popular culture ==
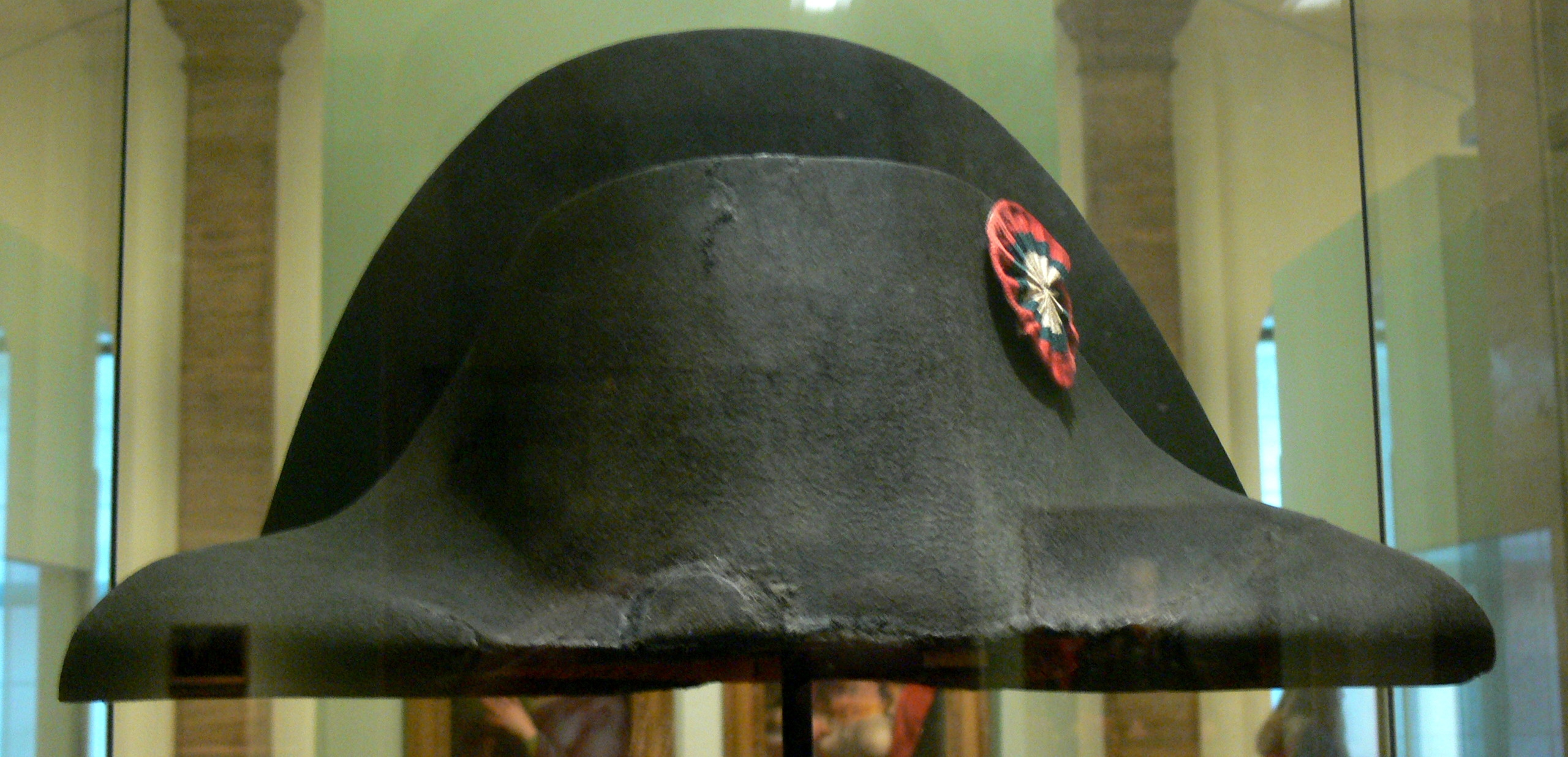
Napoleon's hat is a cultural icon.

=== Napoleon's height ===
1803 cartoon by James Gillray depicting Napoleon as short

British political cartoons of the period, chief among them James Gillray, depicted Napoleon as a short man to mock both him and his expansionist ambitions; the image of Napoleon as being short continues to be widespread today. Confusion has sometimes arisen because of different values for the French inch (pouce) of the time (2.7 cm) and for the Imperial inch (2.54 cm).; he has been cited as being from 1.57 metres (5 ft 2 in), which made him the height of the average French male at that time, and up to 1.7 metres (5 ft 7 in) tall, which is above average for the period. (Note: Napoleon's height was 5 ft 2 French inches according to Antommarchi at Napoleon's autopsy and British sources put his height at 5 foot and 4 British inches: both equivalent to 1.4 m. Napoleon surrounded himself with tall bodyguards and had a nickname of le petit caporal which was an affectionate term that reflected his reported camaraderie with his soldiers rather than his height.) British Rear-Admiral Frederick Lewis Maitland, who had daily contact with Napoleon on Maitland's ship for twenty-three days in 1815, states in his memoirs that he was about 1.7 metres (5 ft 7 in). Some historians believe that the reason for the mistake about his size at death came from use of an obsolete French yardstick. Napoleon was a champion of the metric system (introduced in France in 1799) and had no use for the old yardsticks. It is more likely that he was 1.57 metres (5 ft 2 in), the height he was measured at on St. Helena, since he would have most likely been measured with an English yardstick rather than a yardstick of the Old French Regime.

Napoleon's nickname of le petit caporal has added to the confusion, as some non-Francophones have mistakenly interpreted petit by its literal meaning of "small". In fact, it is an affectionate term reflecting on his camaraderie with ordinary soldiers. Napoleon also surrounded himself with the soldiers of his elite guard, required to be 1.83 m (6 ft) or taller, making him look smaller in comparison.

Napoleon's name has been lent to the Napoleon complex, a colloquial term describing an alleged type of inferiority complex which is said to affect some people who are physically short. The term is used more generally to describe people who are driven by a perceived handicap to overcompensate in other aspects of their lives.

=== The Napoleon Delusion ===
Napoleon Bonaparte is one of the most famous individuals in the Western world. As delusional patients sometimes believe themselves to be an important or grandiose figure (see delusion), a patient claiming to be Napoleon has been a common stereotype in popular culture for delusions of this nature.

- In the 1922 film Mixed Nuts, Stan Laurel plays a book salesman whose only volume for sale is a biography of Napoleon. When the character receives a blow to the head, he comes to believe that he is Napoleon and is subsequently admitted to a mental institution.
- In the 1925 Fleischer movie "Ko-ko Nuts", Koko the Clown goes to an asylum, where there is a whole Napoleon department for people who think they're Napoleon.

This cliché has itself been parodied:

- In the Bugs Bunny film Napoleon Bunny-Part, the actual Napoleon is dragged away by psychiatric attendants, who believe he is delusional.
- The song "They're Coming to Take Me Away, Ha-Haaa!" was recorded by Jerry Samuels billed as Napoleon XIV. Some other versions of the song were made with lyrics referencing the Napoleon delusion (such as a Spanish version entitled "Soy Napoleon") or with the artist's name referencing a fictitious emperor.
- In The Emperor's New Clothes, Ian Holm plays Napoleon who stumbles into the grounds of an asylum and finds himself surrounded by other "Napoleons" - he cannot reveal his identity for fear of being grouped with the deluded. Holm also played a less-than-serious Napoleon in the 1981 film Time Bandits.
- The Discworld novel Making Money features a character who believes himself to be Lord Vetinari, imitating Vetinari's mannerisms and entertaining delusions of grandeur. It is later revealed that the local hospital has an entire ward for people with the same delusion, where they engage in competitions to determine who is the "real" Vetinari.
- In an episode of cult 1960s British TV sci-fi show The Prisoner called "The Girl Who Was Death", which unusually for the series was a light-hearted comedy tale parodying the spy thriller genre, the villain Dr. Schnipps (Kenneth Griffith) believed that he was Napoleon and acted accordingly, at one point asking the protagonist Number Six (Patrick McGoohan), "You're not the Duke of Wellington, are you?"
- In the first episode of season 2 of Teenage Mutant Ninja Turtles titled "Return of the Shredder" (1988), Scientist and Inventor, Baxter Stockman is seen in a jail cell with a man in Napoleonic garb spouting off dialogue in a French accent.
- In an episode of Night Court, Judge Harry Stone (Harry Anderson) is placed in a jail cell along with a number of 'mentally disturbed' inmates all dressed as Napoleon. His court defence attorney (played by Markie Post) sees him and exclaims "Oh sir. They put you in with the little generals".
- The award-winning video game Psychonauts features a mental patient, Fred Bonaparte, locked in an obsessive mind-game with his distant ancestor Napoleon, who is fighting for his mind.
- In the Futurama episode "Insane in the Mainframe", Bender pretends to be a banjo-playing Napoleon in order to stay in a robot asylum.

== See also ==
- Bicentenary of the death of Napoleon I
- Legacy of Napoleon
