= People Like Us (1980 film) =

- Written by: Michael Laurence
- Directed by: Ian Coughlan
- Starring: Lucky Grills; David Atkins; Brian Hannan
- Country of origin: Australia
- Original language: English

Production
- Production company: Hannay Oakden Productions

Original release
- Release: 1980

People Like Us is a 1980 Australian film about five families living in the western suburbs of Sydney. It was the pilot for a TV series that did not eventuate.

== Cast ==
- Lucky Grills as Bert Stanley
- David Atkins as Tom Stanley
- Brian Hannan as Ted Phipps
- Kit Taylor as Jim Brookes
- Lyn Collingwood as Maisie Stanley
- Marion Johns as Mrs Johnson
- Alister Smart as Detective Rogers
- Helen Hough
