= Helen Scott (actress) =

Australian actress

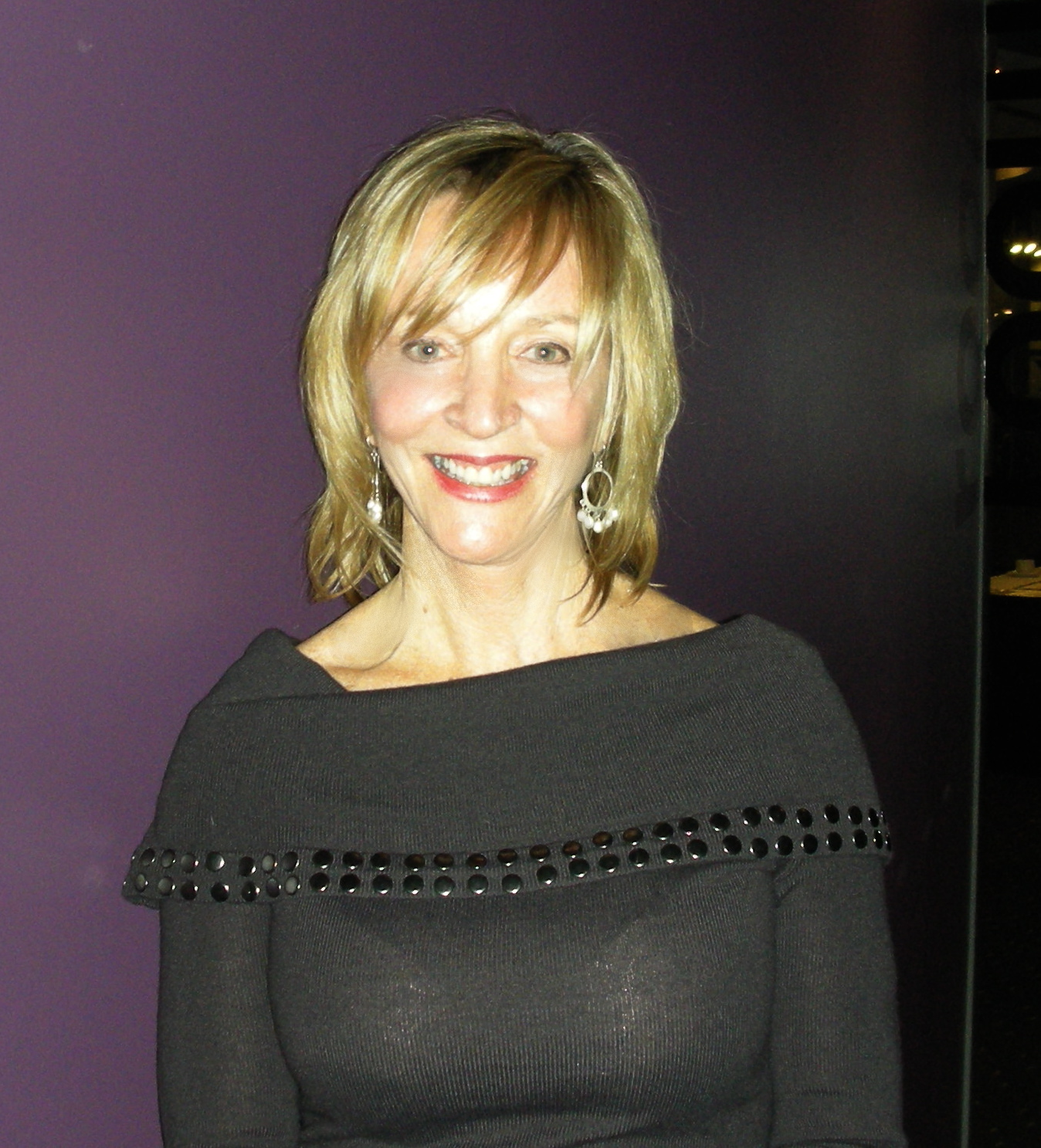
- Born: Helen Hough; New Zealand
- Occupations: Actress (stage and television)
- Years active: 1973–2001
- Known for: A Country Practice as Matron Marta Kurtesz; The Young Doctors as Sister Norma Campbell

Helen Scott (née Hough) is a New Zealand-born Australian former actress best known for her work in theatre and on television. She is best known as an original cast member of television series A Country Practice as hospital matron Marta Kurtesz.

== Career ==
Scott is best known for her roles in television soap operas, including The Young Doctors in 1981 as Sister Norma Campbell. The same year, she was also part of the original cast of A Country Practice, playing the regular ongoing role of hospital matron Marta Kurtesz. In the latter, she portrayed the character utilising a Central European accent. One of her primary story arcs in the serial was her romance with Dr. Terence Elliott (played by Shane Porteous). She left the show in 1983, in the episode "Love & Glory", with her character returning to Hungary with old friend, Bela Szollos (played by Barry Otto).

In 1979, Scott appeared opposite James Condon in the television series, Carrots, about a group of people putting together a children’s television show called "The Funny Bunny Show", featuring a 7-foot-tall rabbit called Moses. Scott's character, Sally Fraser worked on the “show within a show”. From 1979 to 1980, she featured in comedy sketch series Don't Ask Us, playing a variety of characters over a number of episodes.

Scott had a recurring role in drama series The Last Resort in 1988. She later had a three-episode guest role as Pam McWilliam in another drama series Big Sky in 1997. She also had guest roles in television series including Patrol Boat, Chances, Water Rats, Above the Law and All Saints, and was in several made-for-television films.

Scott also appeared in numerous theatre productions. Beginning her stage career in 1973, she performed at Perth's Octagon Theatre, The Hole in the Wall Theatre, Playhouse Theatre and Greenroom Theatre. In 1987, she played Ceres in a staging of Shakespeare's The Tempest at the Sydney Opera House with Old Tote Theatre Company.

== Personal life ==
Scott is married to husband, Richard Scott, with whom she has a daughter, Alexis Jessica.

== Acting credits ==
=== Television ===
Year	Title	Role	Type	Ref.
1977	Death Cell	(as Helen Hough)	TV movie	
1978	The Scalp Merchant	Iris Bruhr(as Helen Hough)	TV movie	
1979	Money in the Bank	(as Helen Hough)	TV movie	
1979	Patrol Boat	Carol (as Helen Hough)	1 episode	
1979	Carrots	Sally Fraser (as Helen Hough)		
1979–1980	Don't Ask Us	Various characters	13 episodes	
1980	People Like Us	(as Helen Hough)	TV movie	
1981	The Young Doctors	Sister Norma Campbell (as Helen Hough)	28 episodes	
1981–1983	A Country Practice	Matron Marta Kurtesz (as Helen Scott)	126 episodes	
1988	The Last Resort	Recurring role		
1991	Chances	Carol Hawkins	1 episode	
1996; 1998	Water Rats	Mary Beth Endicott / Joy Godfrey	2 episodes	
1997	Big Sky	Pam McWilliam	3 episodes	
2000	Above the Law		1 episode	
2001	All Saints	Sheila McArdle	1 episode	

=== Stage ===
Year	Title	Role	Type	Ref.
1973	Hay Fever		Mercury Theatre, Auckland	
1974"	Julius Caesar	Servant to Octavius	Octagon Theatre, Perth with The Swan Players	
1974"	As You Like It	Rosalind	Octagon Theatre, Perth with The Swan Players	
1974"	The Black Queen		Hole in the Wall Theatre, Perth	
1974	Tom		Hole in the Wall Theatre, Perth	
1975	Jesters		Hole in the Wall Theatre, Perth	
1976	The Magistrate		Playhouse, Perth with National Theatre	
1976	Everyone's a General		Greenroom Theatre, Perth with National Theatre	
1976	You Want It Don't You Billy?		Greenroom Theatre, Perth with National Theatre	
1976	Days in the Trees		Hole in the Wall Theatre, Perth	
1976	Mixed Doubles		Hole in the Wall Theatre, Perth	
1977	How Does Your Garden Grow?	Woman	Hole in the Wall Theatre, Perth	
1977	Happy End	Miriam	Hole in the Wall Theatre, Perth	
1977	Travesties	Cecily Carruthers	Hole in the Wall Theatre, Perth	
1977	Inner Voices	Anna / Princess / Ali / Babyface	Hole in the Wall Theatre, Perth	
1977	The Beggar's Opera		Octagon Theatre, Perth with Opera Viva	
1977	The Tempest	Ceres	Sydney Opera House with Old Tote Theatre Company	
1978	No Sex Please, We're British	Frances Hunter	Regal Theatre, Perth with Interstar	
1978	Catch Me if You Can	Elizabeth Corban	Marian St Theatre, Sydney	
1980	Gladbags	Pauline	Phillip Theatre, Sydney with Ensemble Theatre	
