= Napoleon complex =

Purported type of inferiority complex

1803 political cartoon by James Gillray depicting Napoleon as short

The Napoleon complex, also known as Napoleon syndrome and short-man syndrome, is a term to describe persons of short stature or dwarfism, typically men, who are perceived to have overly aggressive or domineering social behavior. There is the implication such behavior is to compensate for the subject's physical or social shortcomings or insecurities. Both commonly and in psychology, the Napoleon complex is regarded as a derogatory social stereotype. The Napoleon complex is named after Napoleon Bonaparte, the first emperor of the French, who was estimated to have been 5 feet 2 inches tall (in pre–metric system French measures), which equals around 1.67 metres or just under 5 feet 6 inches in imperial measure. Though Napoleon was close to average height for his era, British cartoonist James Gillray nonetheless popularized the myth of Napoleon being short.

Research on whether short persons display higher levels of aggression or domineering behavior has produced mixed results.

== Etymology ==
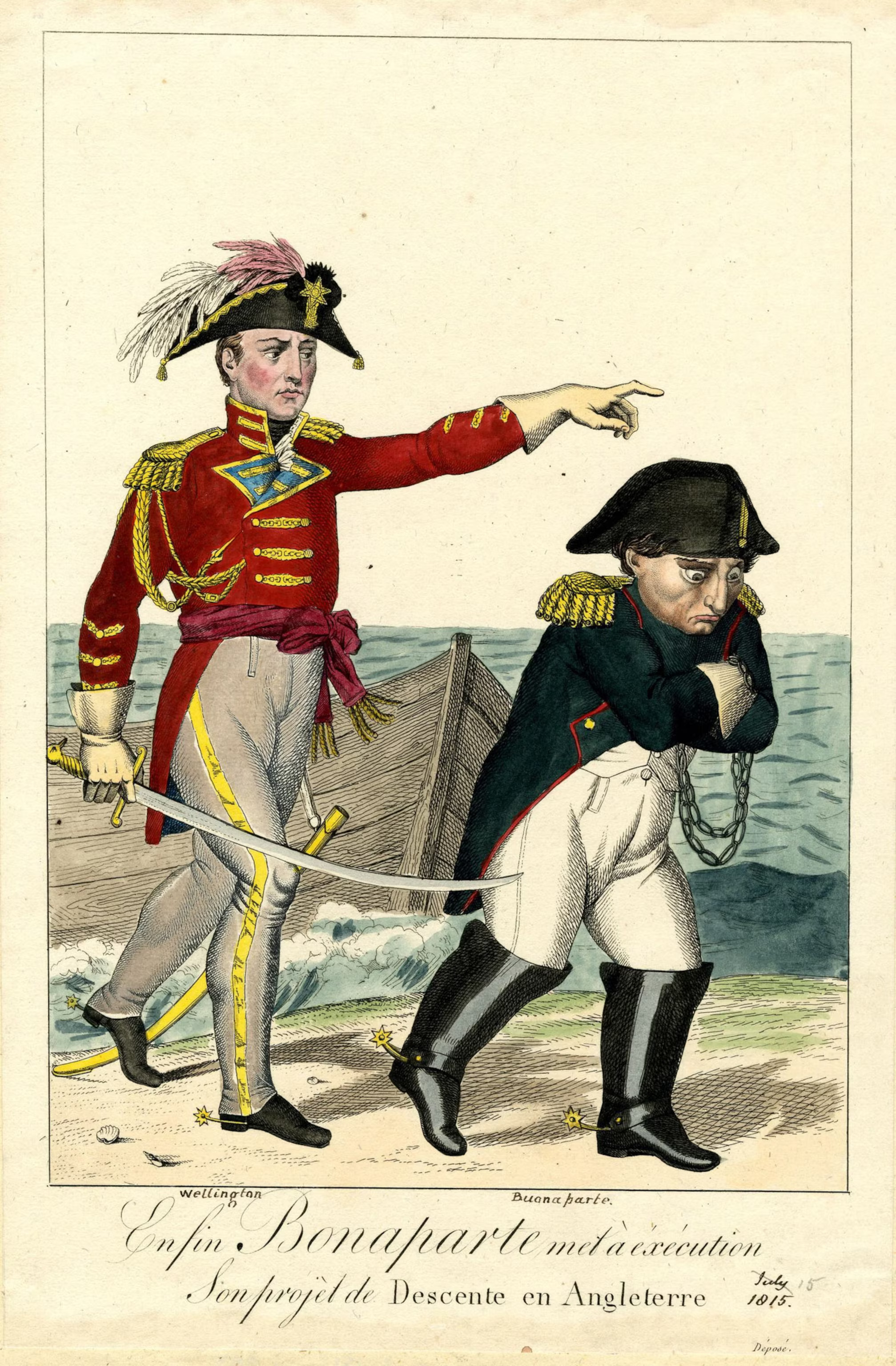
1815 French cartoon depicting the Duke of Wellington ordering Napoleon into exile

The Napoleon complex is named after French military officer and emperor Napoleon. Cultural depictions of Napoleon often depict him as compensating for his supposedly short height by seeking power and glory via aggressive military endeavors. This view was fostered in large part by British political cartoonists, who repeatedly depicted Napoleon as short to mock both him and his expansionist ambitions; He is estimated to have been 1.67 metres tall (5 feet 2 inches in pre–metric system French measures or just under 5 feet 6 inches in imperial measure). This was the period's average adult male height, depending on the source chosen. Other historians assert that he was 5 feet 7 inches (1.70 metres) because he was measured on Saint Helena 28 years after the French adopted the metric system.

Other names for the purported condition include Napoleonic complex, Napoleon syndrome and short man syndrome.

== Research ==
=== Affirmative ===
Abraham Buunk, a professor at the University of Groningen in the Netherlands, found evidence of the Napoleon complex. Researchers at the university found that men who were 1.63 metres (5 ft 4 in) were 50% more likely to show signs of jealousy than men who were 1.98 metres (6 ft 6 in).

In 2018, evolutionary psychologist Mark van Vugt and his team at the Vrije Universiteit Amsterdam found evidence for the Napoleon complex in human males. Men of short stature behaved more (indirectly) aggressively in interactions with taller men when playing competitive games under laboratory conditions. Their evolutionary psychology hypothesis argues that in competitive situations when males, human or nonhuman, receive cues that they are physically outcompeted, the Napoleon complex psychology kicks in: physically weaker males should adopt alternative behavioral strategies to level the playing field, including showing indirect aggression and coalition building.

Research on personality traits suggests an association between height and antagonistic behavior in men who are dissatisfied with their short height rather than objective shortness being a determining factor. Bleeker et al. (2022) examined relationships between height and the Dark Triad—including Narcissism, Machiavellianism, and Psychopathy—and reported antagonistic traits were more strongly associated with dissatisfaction about one’s height than with objective height. These findings are consistent with broader research in Social psychology indicating that perceived social status, rather than physical characteristics alone, is associated with variation in antagonistic and competitive behavior.

=== Negative ===
In 2007, a study by the University of Central Lancashire concluded that the Napoleon complex is a myth. The study discovered that short men were less likely to lose their temper than men of average height. The experiment involved subjects dueling each other with sticks, with one subject deliberately rapping the other's knuckles. Heart monitors revealed that the taller men were more likely to lose their tempers and hit back. University of Central Lancashire lecturer Mike Eslea commented that "when people see a short man being aggressive, they are likely to think it is due to his size, simply because that attribute is obvious and grabs their attention".

The Wessex Growth Study was a community-based longitudinal study conducted in the UK that monitored the psychological development of children from school entry to adulthood. The study was controlled for potential effects of gender and socioeconomic status, and found that "no significant differences in personality functioning or aspects of daily living were found which could be attributable to height"; these traits included generalizations associated with the Napoleon complex, such as risk-taking behaviours.

== In popular culture ==
The Northern Irish chamber pop band the Divine Comedy released a tongue-in-cheek song called "Napoleon complex" in 2016 on their eleventh studio album Foreverland, lampooning the complex.

== See also ==
- Human height
- Heightism
- Inferiority complex
