= Carrots (TV series) =

- Developed by: Roger Bliss
- Written by: Derek Strachan; Michael Lawrence
- Directed by: Roger Bliss
- Country of origin: Australia
- Original language: English
- No. of seasons: 1
- No. of episodes: 98

Production
- Producer: Michael Lawrence
- Editor: Trevor Hawkins
- Running time: 30 minutes

Original release
- Network: ATN7
- Release: July 2, 1979 – 1979

Carrots is an Australian television series that aired on ATN 7 in 1979. Airing four nights a week it was a television show about a television show. It presented a television crew creating a show called The Funny Bunny Show with a giant rabbit as its principal character. The show was twice denied a C classification but it was still able to air between 4pm and 5pm as the 2 hours of non-C-classified programming allowed each week.

== Cast ==
- Gerry Gallagher as Moses (a 214 cm tall rabbit)
- James Condon as Horace W. Hathaway
- Sheila Kennelly as Mabel Dodds
- Greg Bepper as Johnny Preston
- Brendon Lunney as Mark Adams
- Helen Hough as Sally Fraser
- David Foster as Alex Pandopoulos
- Frank Hruby as Tim Salmon
- Brian Anderson as TT (voice)
