= Man of Destiny (film) =

- Based on: play by George Bernard Shaw
- Directed by: Christopher Muir
- Country of origin: Australia
- Original language: English

Production
- Production company: ABC

Original release
- Network: ABC
- Release: 20 February 1963 (Melbourne)
- Release: 24 April 1963
- Release: 14 May 1963 (Brisbane)

Man of Destiny is a 1963 Australian television play directed by Christopher Muir. It was based on the 1897 play Man of Destiny by George Bernard Shaw. Just like the play it revolves around the early career of Napoleon Bonaparte.

The play would be filmed again by the ABC in 1967.

== Plot ==
In Tavazzano in May 1796, after the battle of Lodi, Napoleon meets a young Lady who he believes could be a spy, but to whom he is attracted.

== Cast ==
- Edward Hepple as Napoleon
- Felicity Young as the Lady
- Stewart Weller as Guiseppe Grando
- David Mitchell as the Lieutenant

== Production ==
It was Hepple's first production in Melbourne though he had done numerous TV plays such as The Square Ring, The Little Woman and The Patriots. While he made the production he rehearsed a Shaw play at the Union Theatre, Arms and the Man and The No Hoper. "I've never acted in a Shaw play before and here I am in two," said Hepple. "My greatest difficulty is the scarcity of books on Napoleon at this part of his life."

== Reception ==
The Sydney Morning Herald said director Muir "threw away much of the impact" of the central situation by casting Edward Hepple as Naploeon saying Heple "in many ways an excellent actor but he is better at portraying craftiness than common sense" and saying it was " an outwardly competent production that missed most of the special slang and flavour of Shaw's view of history."

== 1967 Production ==
The play was re filmed by the ABC in 1967 as an episode of Love and War. That aired on 13 September 1967 (20 September 1967 in Brisbane).

It was filmed in Melbourne, Patrick Barton directed. Filmink said "l the way through watching this, I was wondering why the hell the ABC were making it – especially as they’d already filmed it four years previously. I mean, seriously, only four years – and it wasn’t very well known Shaw either."

=== Cast ===
- Brian Hannan as the Young Napoleon
- Anne Charleston as the Young Lady
- Dennis Miller as the lieutenant
- Stanley Page as the innkeeper

=== Reception ===
Filmink wrote "Patrick Barton directs well."
