= Napoleonic toys =

Toys in likeness of Napoleon, often caricatured

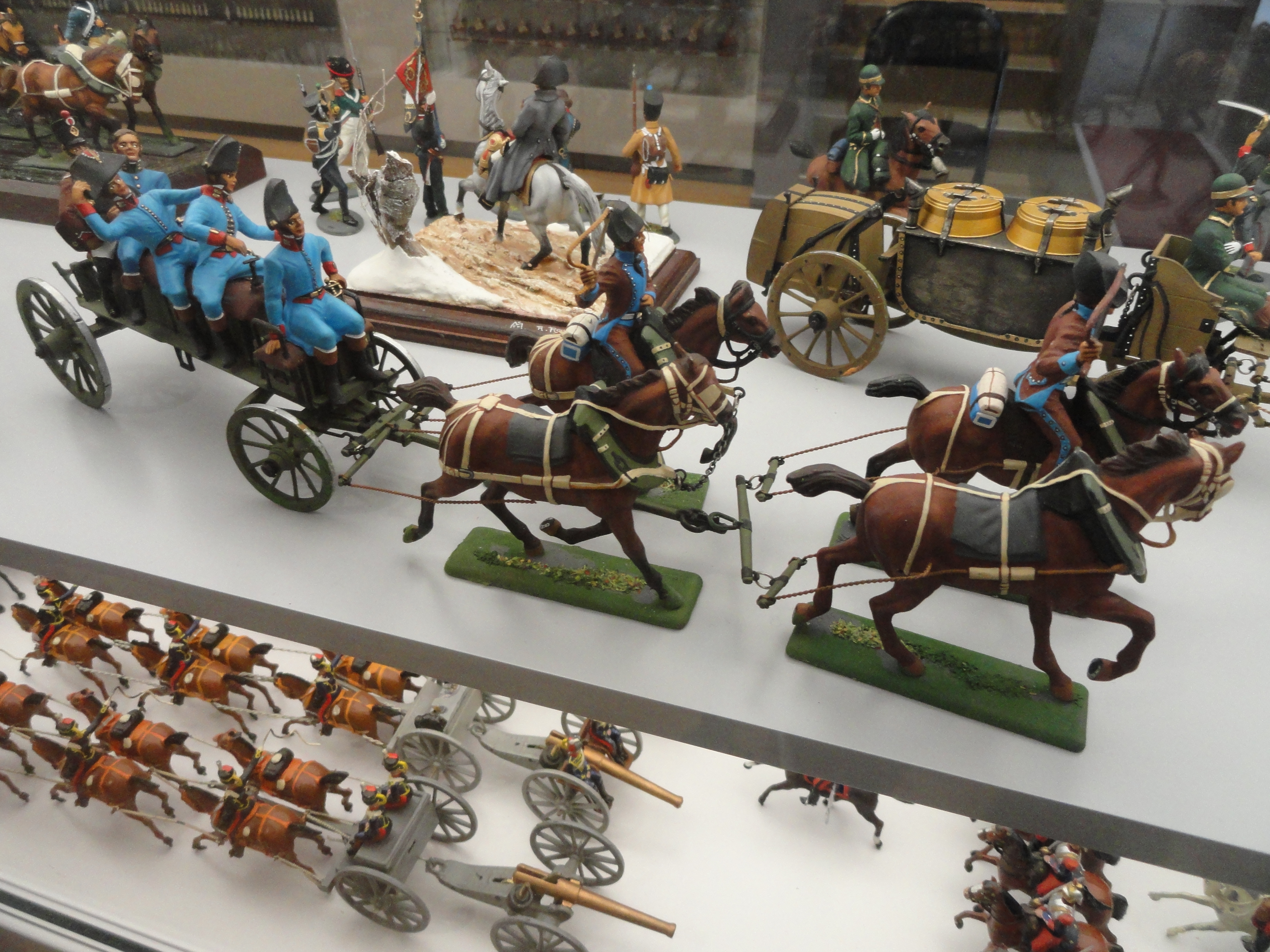
Napoleonic toys

Napoleonic toys are children's toys, which were made starting during the early 19th century in Europe, which featured the likeness Napoleon I of France, often in the manner of a caricature.

== Image ==
During his reign as the Emperor of France, Napoleon Bonaparte was probably the most prominent figure in world politics. As such, he was often the subject of caricatures in media such as propagandist political cartoons. Many notable caricatures of Napoleon came from English artists, who often caricatured Napoleon in a very unflattering manner, as the English were prominent foes of Napoleon in the Napoleonic Wars. The character of "Little Boney", who is modeled after Napoleon but with particular emphasis on certain physical attributes of his, appeared in a number of political cartoons of the time. The "Little Boney" depiction of Napoleon often made light of his supposedly diminutive stature. In addition, Napoleon was often shown possessing a body or being arrayed in such a way as to be out of proportion, such as having an unusually large cocked hat, long dark hair, and a sallow face.

The strong nationalistic spirits of countries aligned against Napoleon dictated that he should be depicted as is appropriate to depict the leader of the enemies of one's country, that is to say most unflatteringly. The portrayal of Napoleon in various caricatures became a concern of Romantic-era artists as to how the images reflect the humanity of Napoleon himself as a man. Various depictions were used to characterize Napoleon, a man who was at some parts of his reign the most powerful and prominent man alive in the world, throughout his rise and fall from power. Depictions of Napoleon in political cartoons vary widely and include depictions of him as a diminutive child, being completely nude, an imposing ruler and general, or as a large and monstrous figure that was intent on literally devouring the world.

== Toys ==
In the countries of Napoleon's foes, such as England, the image of "Little Boney", a persona created by cartoonists such as James Gillray and Isaac Cruikshank, started to appear on a diverse array of everyday items used by adults around the years 1802–1805. The caricature image of Napoleon appeared in the early 19th century on many different items which included playing cards, lottery tickets, and snuff boxes. Examples of such items include pipe-bowls and walking sticks that were adorned with the head of Napoleon, or a cardboard and catgut thermometer which features Napoleon holding a laurel crown in one hand and pointing towards a tempest with the other. Like their adult counterparts, items for children began to appear emblazoned with the image of Napoleon around the same time. The caricatured image of Napoleon appeared on children's toys such as puzzles, games, and primers.

== Significance ==
There are a number of hypotheses as to why the image of Napoleon because so prominent on items including the toys of children during the time of the Napoleonic Wars. However, hypotheses for the existence of Napoleonic toys basically boil down to hypotheses of fear and respect versus hypotheses of ridicule.

Some hypotheses take a psycho-social view and state that the prevalence of the image of Napoleon on the toys of children was due to the respect that people had for Napoleon that manifested as a type of hero worship. Similarly, others argue that the existence of Napoleonic toys was allegorical of the childlike fear that his enemies had for Napoleon and the military might of his empire.

Other hypotheses state quite the contrary and assert that the reason for the images of Napoleon on the toys of children was actually due to a lack of respect for Napoleon and his policies. An example of how Napoleon was viewed by his foes was that of czarist Russia, another enemy nation of Napoleon, which lifted a ban in 1812, that had been imposed by the czars for the previous two centuries, on caricatured images. The Czar specifically lifted the ban on caricatured political cartoons in order to make fun of Napoleon after his invasion of Russia. The argument that caricatured images of Napoleon were meant as a send-up of him is supported by facts such as how the caricatured, and frequently quite unflattering, representations of Napoleon were often used on children's toys as opposed to more dignified depictions. Also, Napoleonic toys were most prevalent in nations that were Napoleon's enemies in combat such as Great Britain and Russia. Meanwhile, such toys are conversely rare, if they indeed existed at all, in France. In addition, Napoleonic toys started appearing in Great Britain right after Great Britain and Napoleonic France had renewed a declaration of war against each other, thus supporting the argument that Napoleonic toys were meant to be patriotic lampoons of an enemy. If patriotism was indeed the motivating force behind Napoleonic toys, then it is likely that their purpose was to inculcate younger generations to have a lack of respect for the leader of the enemy country. As pieces of propaganda, these toys reflect the attitudes of those making them that they wanted to have passed down to the younger generations. The reflected attitude from these toys seems to say in an allegorical way that Napoleonic-era Europe was just one big game.
