= Don't Ask Us =

- Written by: Austin Steele
- Directed by: Julian Pringle
- Starring: Brian Hannan; Julie McGregor; Doug Scroope; Liddy Clark; David Whitford; Helen Hough
- Country of origin: Australia
- Original language: English
- No. of seasons: 1
- No. of episodes: 13

Production
- Producer: Austin Steele
- Running time: 25 minutes

Original release
- Network: ATN-7
- Release: 1979 – 1981

Don't Ask Us is an Australian comedy sketch television series that aired on Channel 7 in Sydney in 1979 and in Melbourne in 1980. The thirteen episode series was a collection of short skits and one liners. It featured an ensemble cast of Brian Hannan, Julie McGregor, Doug Scroope, Liddy Clark, David Whitford and Helen Hough.
