= Brian Hannan =

Australian actor

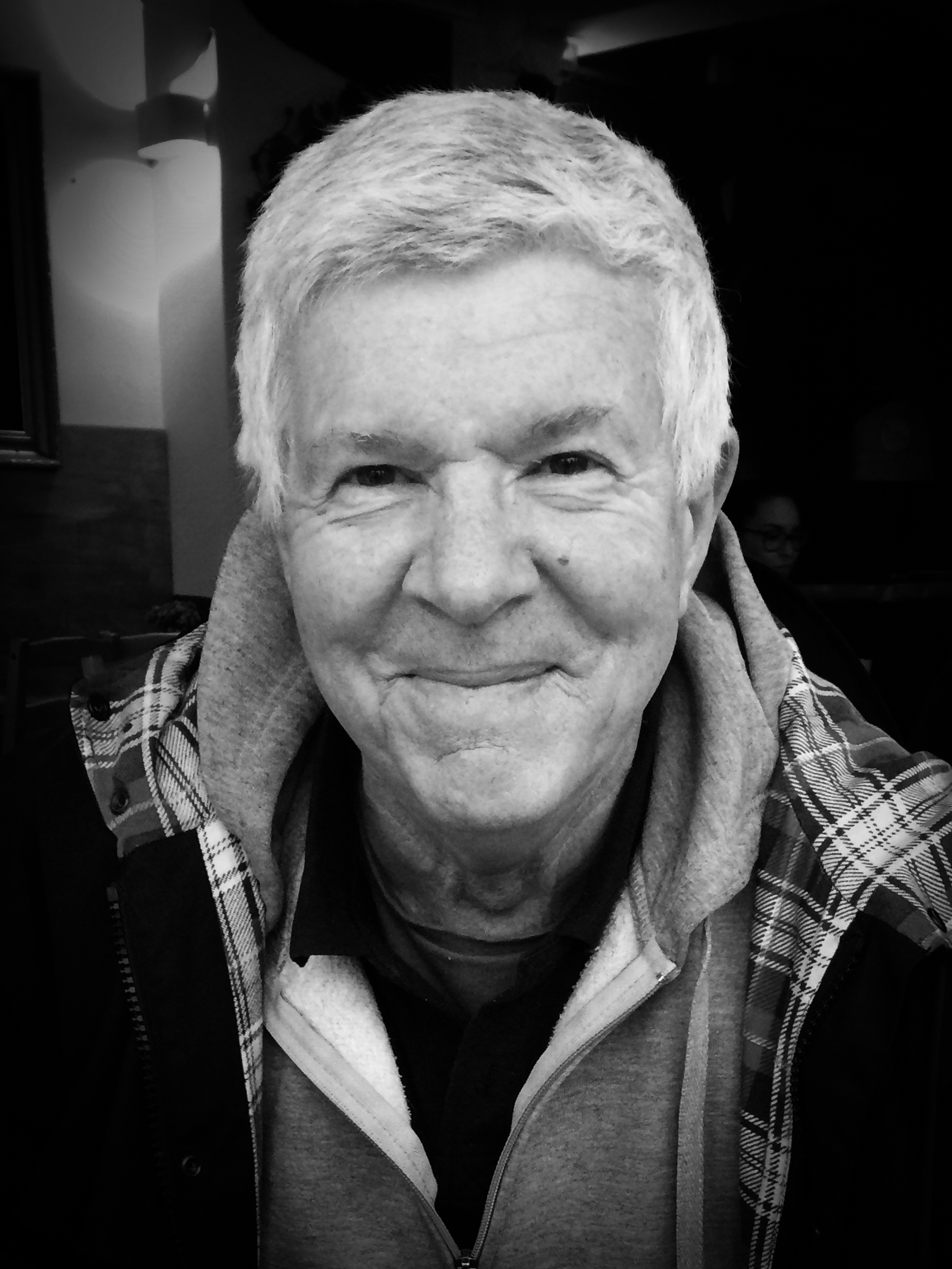
- Born: 19 August 1942 (age 84); Stirling, Scotland
- Occupation: Actor
- Years active: 1958 - 2017
- Notable work: Bellbird, Prisoner Cell Block H
- Partner: Susan Hannan (nee Hathaway) Renalda Whitteridge ( nee Green)
- Children: 2

Brian Hannan (born 19 August 1942) is an Australian former actor, and voice artist, born in Stirling, Scotland. He featured in the TV series drama Prisoner as Officer Terry Harrison.

== Early life ==
Brian Hannan was born to Barry and Myna Hannan (née Mills) on 19 August 1942. When Brian was nine, his family migrated to Australia when the Australian Government initiated the Populate or Perish policy with the introduction of the Assisted Passage Migration Scheme, otherwise known as the Ten Pound Pom. They arrived in Western Australia and lived in Perth. When Brian was eighteen, he moved to Melbourne to pursue acting.

== Career ==
He began his acting career by appearing in theatre productions in Western Australia including George Washington Slept Here (1958) and The No Hopers (1961)., both at the Playhouse Theatre in Perth, before moving to Melbourne.

Hannan performed in stage musicals with the J. C. Williamson Theatres in the 1960s, including Camelot (1963) Hello, Dolly! (1965) The Boys from Syracuse (1966) The Fantasticks (1966) and Half a Sixpence (1967). Stage shows include The Bones of My Toe (1963) and Bread and Butter (1970).

He appeared in filmed for TV plays such as The Sweet Sad Story of Elmo and Me, playing the titular role of Elmo in 1965. and Man of Destiny in 1967 in which he played the young Napoleon Bonaparte.

In 1968, Brian along with Judee Horin, Wally Ruffe and Brian's future wife Susan Hathaway toured Europe and the Middle East as cabaret act Take Five.

Perhaps best known for his recurring television roles, he rose to fame in the 1970s on Bellbird as main character Roger Green, and later went on to play Terry Harrison in Prisoner during the 1980s. He also starred in the comedy sketch series Don't Ask Us. During the 1970s and 1980s Brian had character roles on Ted Hamilton's Musical World, Hey Hey It's Saturday, and small roles on Cop Shop and Blue Heelers.

During the 1980s and 1990s Brian performed in theatre restaurant shows including Tikki and Johns, The Malvern Tivoli, Nero's Fiddle, Flicks Theatre Restaurant and Dracula's Theatre Restaurant both in Melbourne and on the Gold Coast. He understudied Daryl Somers in the role of Sancho Panza in the 1989 Australian revival of Man Of La Mancha.

Brian was also a voice over artist providing voices for radio, television and animated films such as The Phantom Treehouse. and also sang the theme tune for the animated direct-to-video Disney sequel Aladin The Return of Jafar.

In 1997 Brian began performing with Promac Productions. He toured Australia performing in Gilbert and Sullivan shows, Morning Melodies and The Peter Allen Show, finishing in 2017.
