= Logie Award for Most Outstanding Miniseries or Telemovie =

- Country: Australia
- Presented by: TV Week
- First award: 1991
- Currently held by: Fires (2022)
- Website: www.tvweeklogieawards.com.au

The Silver Logie for Most Outstanding Miniseries or Telemovie is an award presented annually at the Australian TV Week Logie Awards. The award is given to recognise an outstanding Australian single drama, miniseries or telemovie. The winner and nominees of this award are chosen by television industry juries.

== History and category evolution ==
Nominees in this category had previously been included in the Logie Award for Most Outstanding Drama Series which was first awarded at the 3rd Annual TV Week Logie Awards ceremony, held in 1961 as Best Australian Drama. The award was renamed many times in subsequent ceremonies; Best Australian TV Drama Series (1962), Best Drama (1963, 1966–1967), Best Australian Drama Series (1965, 1970), Best Drama Series (1968), and Best Drama Show (1969). This award category was eliminated in 1977.

Awards were given for Best Single Dramatic Production in 1978, Best Single Drama in 1979 to 1981, and Best Single Drama or Mini Series from 1982 to 1985.

At the 33rd Annual TV Week Logie Awards in 1991, an industry voted award for drama returned, originally called Most Outstanding Single Drama or Miniseries. It has also been known as Most Outstanding Series (1992–1993, 1998), Most Outstanding Achievement in Drama Production (1994–1997) and Most Outstanding Drama Series, Miniseries or Telemovie (2007–2012).

In 2013, the categories were split into Most Outstanding Drama Series and Most Outstanding Miniseries or Telemovie. Miniseries Howzat! Kerry Packer's War was the inaugural winner of this standalone category.

== Winners and nominees ==
Key	Meaning
‡	Indicates the winning program

Listed below are the winners of the award for each year for Best Australian Drama.

Year	Program	Network	Ref
1961	Shadow of a Pale Horse‡	Seven Network	
1962	Consider Your Verdict‡	Seven Network	
1963	The One Day of the Year‡	Nine Network	
1965	Homicide‡	Seven Network	
1966	Homicide‡	Seven Network	
1967	Homicide‡	Seven Network	
1968	Homicide‡	Seven Network	
1969	Homicide‡	Seven Network	
1970	Division 4‡	Nine Network	
1971	Homicide‡	Seven Network	
1972	Division 4‡	Nine Network	
1973	Homicide‡	Seven Network	
1974	Number 96‡	Network Ten	
1975	Number 96‡	Network Ten	
1976	Number 96‡	Network Ten	

Year	Program	Network	Ref
1978	The Alternative‡	HSV-7	
1979	Bit Part‡	ABC	
1980	Burn the Butterflies‡	ABC	
1981	Cold Comfort‡		
1982	A Town Like Alice‡		
1983	1915‡		
1984	The Dismissal‡		
1985	Waterfront‡		

Listed below are the winners of the award for each year, as well as the other nominees for Most Outstanding Single Drama or Miniseries or Most Outstanding Drama Series.

Year	Program	Network	Ref
1991	Come In Spinner‡	ABC TV	
1992	Brides of Christ‡	ABC TV	
1993	The Leaving of Liverpool‡	ABC TV	
1994	Phoenix II‡	ABC TV	
1995	Janus‡	ABC TV	
1996	Blue Murder‡	ABC TV	
1997	Water Rats‡	Nine Network	
1998	Wildside‡	ABC TV	
1998	Halifax f.p.	Nine Network	
1998	Simone De Beauvoir's Babies	ABC TV	
1999	The Day of the Roses	Network Ten	
1999	A Difficult Woman	ABC TV	
1999	Aftershocks	SBS TV	
1999	Halifax f.p.: Afraid of the Dark	Nine Network	
2000	Not awarded		
2001	Halifax f.p.: A Person Of Interest‡	Nine Network	
2001	Dogwoman – The Legend of Dogwoman	Seven Network	
2001	Ihaka – Blunt Instrument	Network Ten	
2001	Marriage Acts	ABC TV	
2001	The Potato Factory	Seven Network	
2001	Waiting at the Royal	Nine Network	
2002	Changi ‡	ABC TV	
2002	Do Or Die	Seven Network	
2002	The Farm	ABC TV	
2002	My Brother Jack	Network Ten	
2002	Halifax f.p.: Playing God	Nine Network	
2003	The Road From Coorain‡	ABC TV	
2003	Heroes' Mountain	Network Ten	
2003	Secret Bridesmaids' Business	ABC TV	
2004	After the Deluge‡	Network Ten	
2004	BlackJack	Network Ten	
2004	Marking Time	ABC TV	
2004	The Postcard Bandit	Nine Network	
2004	The Shark Net	ABC TV	
2005	Jessica‡	Network Ten	
2005	The Alice	Nine Network	
2005	The Brush Off, Murray Whelan Series	Seven Network	
2005	Small Claims	Network Ten	
2005	Through My Eyes: The Lindy Chamberlain Story	Seven Network	
2006	The Incredible Journey of Mary Bryant‡	Network Ten	
2006	Da Kath and Kim Code	ABC TV	
2006	Hell Has Harbour Views	ABC TV	
2006	Little Oberon	Nine Network	
2006	Small Claims: White Wedding	Network Ten	
2007	Love My Way‡	W. Channel	
2007	Answered by Fire	ABC TV	
2007	RAN Remote Area Nurse	SBS TV	
2007	The Silence	ABC TV	
2007	The Society Murders	Network Ten	
2008	Curtin‡	ABC1	
2008	City Homicide	Seven Network	
2008	East West 101	SBS	
2008	The King	TV1	
2008	Satisfaction	Showcase	
2009	Underbelly‡	Nine Network	
2009	Bed of Roses	ABC1	
2009	Packed to the Rafters	Seven Network	
2009	Rush	Network Ten	
2009	Scorched	Nine Network	
2010	East West 101‡	SBS	
2010	A Model Daughter: The Killing of Caroline Byrne	Network Ten	
2010	Packed to the Rafters	Seven Network	
2010	Tangle	Showcase	
2010	Underbelly: A Tale of Two Cities	Nine Network	
2011	Underbelly: The Golden Mile‡	Nine Network	
2011	Hawke	Network Ten	
2011	Packed to the Rafters	Seven Network	
2011	Rake	ABC1	
2011	Rush	Network Ten	
2011	Sisters of War	ABC1	
2012	The Slap‡	ABC1	
2012	Cloudstreet	Showcase	
2012	Offspring	Network Ten	
2012	Paper Giants: The Birth of Cleo	ABC1	
2012	Underbelly: Razor	Nine Network	

Listed below are the winners of the award for each year, as well as the other nominees for Most Outstanding Miniseries or Telemovie.

Year	Program	Network	Ref
2013	Howzat! Kerry Packer's War‡	Nine Network	
2013	Beaconsfield	Nine Network	
2013	Bikie Wars: Brothers in Arms	Network Ten	
2013	Underbelly: Badness	Nine Network	
2013	Underground: The Julian Assange Story	Network Ten	
2014	Top of the Lake‡	UKTV	
2014	An Accidental Soldier	ABC1	
2014	Better Man	SBS One	
2014	Paper Giants: Magazine Wars	ABC1	
2014	Power Games: The Packer-Murdoch War	Nine Network	
2015	Devil's Playground‡	Showcase	
2015	ANZAC Girls	ABC	
2015	The Broken Shore	ABC	
2015	Carlotta	ABC	
2015	INXS: Never Tear Us Apart	Seven Network	
2016	The Secret River‡	ABC	
2016	Deadline Gallipoli	Showcase	
2016	House of Hancock	Nine Network	
2016	Peter Allen: Not the Boy Next Door	Seven Network	
2016	The Beautiful Lie	ABC	
2017	The Kettering Incident‡	Showcase	
2017	Barracuda	ABC	
2017	Deep Water	SBS	
2017	Molly	Seven Network	
2017	Secret City	Showcase	
2018	Romper Stomper‡	Stan	
2018	Safe Harbour	SBS	
2018	Seven Types of Ambiguity	ABC	
2018	Underbelly Files: Chopper	Nine Network	
2018	Wake in Fright	Network Ten	
2019	Bloom‡	Stan	
2019	Olivia Newton-John: Hopelessly Devoted to You	Seven Network	
2019	On The Ropes	SBS	
2019	Pine Gap	ABC	
2019	The Cry	ABC	
2022	Fires‡	ABC	
2022	New Gold Mountain	SBS	
2022	The End	Foxtel	
2022	The Tourist	Stan	
2022	The Unusual Suspects	SBS	

== See also ==
- Logie Award for Most Popular Drama Program
- Logie Award for Most Outstanding Comedy Program
- Logie Award for Most Popular Comedy Program
