= Logie Award for Most Outstanding Drama Series =

Award presented annually at the Australian TV Week Logie Awards

- Country: Australia
- Presented by: TV Week
- First award: 1961
- Currently held by: The Twelve (2023)

Highlights
- Most awards: Homicide (7), Number 96, SeaChange, The Secret Life of Us and Love My Way (3)
- Website: www.tvweeklogieawards.com.au

The Silver Logie for Most Outstanding Drama Series is an award presented annually at the Australian TV Week Logie Awards. The award is given to recognise an outstanding Australian drama series. The winner and nominees of this award are chosen by television industry juries.

It was first awarded at the 3rd Annual TV Week Logie Awards ceremony, held in 1961 as Best Australian Drama. The award was renamed many times in subsequent ceremonies; Best Australian TV Drama Series (1962), Best Drama (1963, 1966–1967), Best Australian Drama Series (1965, 1970), Best Drama Series (1968), and Best Drama Show (1969). This award category was eliminated in 1977.

At the 33rd Annual TV Week Logie Awards in 1991, an industry voted award for drama returned, originally called Most Outstanding Single Drama or Miniseries. It has also been known as Most Outstanding Series (1992–1993, 1998), Most Outstanding Achievement in Drama Production (1994–1997) and Most Outstanding Drama Series, Miniseries or Telemovie (2007–2012). It was known as the Most Outstanding Drama Series from 2013-2022 before changing to Most Outstanding Drama Series, Miniseries or Telemovie in 2023.

Homicide held the record for the most wins of the original award, with seven and Number 96 had three. SeaChange, The Secret Life of Us and Love My Way also had three wins each, followed by Phoenix, Underbelly, Redfern Now and Division 4 with two wins.

== Winners and nominees ==
Key	Meaning
‡	Indicates the winning program

Listed below are the winners of the award for each year for Best Australian Drama.

Year	Program	Network	Ref
1961	Shadow of a Pale Horse‡	Seven Network	
1962	Consider Your Verdict‡	Seven Network	
1963	The One Day of the Year‡	Nine Network	
1965	Homicide‡	Seven Network	
1966	Homicide‡	Seven Network	
1967	Homicide‡	Seven Network	
1968	Homicide‡	Seven Network	
1969	Homicide‡	Seven Network	
1970	Division 4‡	Nine Network	
1971	Homicide‡	Seven Network	
1972	Division 4‡	Nine Network	
1973	Homicide‡	Seven Network	
1974	Number 96‡	Network Ten	
1975	Number 96‡	Network Ten	
1976	Number 96‡	Network Ten	

Listed below are the winners of the award for each year, as well as the other nominees for Most Outstanding Drama Series.

Year	Program	Network	Ref
1991	Come in Spinner‡	ABC TV	
1992	G.P.‡	ABC TV	
1993	Phoenix‡	ABC TV	
1994	Phoenix II‡	ABC TV	
1995	Janus‡	ABC TV	
1996	Blue Murder‡	ABC TV	
1997	Water Rats‡	Nine Network	
1998	Frontline‡	ABC TV	
1998	Good Guys, Bad Guys	Nine Network	
1998	Water Rats	Nine Network	
1999	SeaChange‡	ABC TV	
1999	Blue Heelers	Seven Network	
1999	Water Rats	Nine Network	
1999	Wildside	ABC TV	
2000	SeaChange‡	ABC TV	
2000	All Saints	Seven Network	
2000	Water Rats	Nine Network	
2000	Wildside	ABC TV	
2001	SeaChange‡	ABC TV	
2001	All Saints	Seven Network	
2001	Stingers	Nine Network	
2001	Water Rats	Nine Network	
2002	The Secret Life of Us‡	Network Ten	
2002	All Saints	Seven Network	
2002	Always Greener	Seven Network	
2002	Love Is a Four Letter Word	ABC TV	
2002	Stingers	Nine Network	
2003	The Secret Life of Us‡	Network Ten	
2003	All Saints	Seven Network	
2003	Always Greener	Seven Network	
2003	MDA	ABC TV	
2003	Stingers	Nine Network	
2003	White Collar Blue	Network Ten	
2004	The Secret Life of Us‡	Network Ten	
2004	All Saints	Seven Network	
2004	Always Greener	Seven Network	
2004	Grass Roots	ABC TV	
2004	McLeod's Daughters	Nine Network	
2005	Love My Way‡	Fox8	
2005	Love Bytes	Fox8	
2005	Fireflies	ABC TV	
2005	Stingers	Nine Network	
2005	The Secret Life of Us	Network Ten	
2006	Love My Way‡	Fox8	
2006	All Saints	Seven Network	
2006	McLeod's Daughters	Nine Network	
2006	MDA	ABC TV	
2006	The Surgeon	Network Ten	
2007	Love My Way‡	W. Channel	
2007	Answered by Fire	ABC TV	
2007	RAN Remote Area Nurse	SBS TV	
2007	The Silence	ABC TV	
2007	The Society Murders	Network Ten	
2008	Curtin‡	ABC1	
2008	City Homicide	Seven Network	
2008	East West 101	SBS	
2008	The King	TV1	
2008	Satisfaction	Showcase	
2009	Underbelly‡	Nine Network	
2009	Bed of Roses	ABC1	
2009	Packed to the Rafters	Seven Network	
2009	Rush	Network Ten	
2009	Scorched	Nine Network	
2010	East West 101‡	SBS	
2010	A Model Daughter: The Killing of Caroline Byrne	Network Ten	
2010	Packed to the Rafters	Seven Network	
2010	Tangle	Showcase	
2010	Underbelly: A Tale of Two Cities	Nine Network	
2011	Underbelly: The Golden Mile‡	Nine Network	
2011	Hawke	Network Ten	
2011	Packed to the Rafters	Seven Network	
2011	Rake	ABC1	
2011	Rush	Network Ten	
2011	Sisters of War	ABC1	
2012	The Slap‡	ABC1	
2012	Cloudstreet	Showcase	
2012	Offspring	Network Ten	
2012	Paper Giants: The Birth of Cleo	ABC1	
2012	Underbelly: Razor	Nine Network	
2013	Redfern Now‡	ABC1	
2013	Offspring	Network Ten	
2013	Puberty Blues	Network Ten	
2013	Rake	ABC1	
2013	Tangle	Showcase	
2014	Redfern Now‡	ABC1	
2014	A Place to Call Home	Seven Network	
2014	Offspring	Network Ten	
2014	The Time of Our Lives	ABC1	
2014	Wentworth	SoHo	
2015	Wentworth‡	SoHo	
2015	The Code	ABC	
2015	Janet King	ABC	
2015	Puberty Blues	Network Ten	
2015	Rake	ABC	
2016	Glitch‡	ABC	
2016	800 Words	Seven Network	
2016	A Place to Call Home	Soho	
2016	Love Child	Nine Network	
2016	Wentworth	Soho	
2017	A Place to Call Home‡	Showcase	
2017	Cleverman	ABC	
2017	Rake	ABC	
2017	The Code	ABC	
2017	Wentworth	Showcase	
2018	Wentworth‡	Showcase	
2018	A Place to Call Home	Showcase	
2018	Doctor Doctor	Nine Network	
2018	Harrow	ABC	
2018	Top of the Lake: China Girl	BBC First	
2019	Wentworth‡	Showcase	
2019	Doctor Doctor	Nine Network	
2019	Mystery Road	ABC	
2019	Neighbours	Network Ten	
2019	Secret City: Under The Eagle	Foxtel	
2022	The Newsreader‡	ABC	
2022	Bump	Stan	
2022	Love Me	Binge/Foxtel	
2022	RFDS	Seven Network	
2022	Wentworth - The Final Sentence	Foxtel	
2023	The Twelve‡	Binge/Foxtel	
2023	Black Snow	Stan	
2023	Five Bedrooms	Paramount+	
2023	In Our Blood	ABC	
2023	Mystery Road: Origin	ABC	
2023	Significant Others	ABC	
2024	RFDS‡	Seven Network	
2024	Love Me	Binge/Foxtel	
2024	NCIS: Sydney	Paramount+	
2024	The Newsreader	ABC	
2024	The Tourist	Stan	
2024	Total Control	ABC	
2025	Return to Paradise‡	ABC	
2025	Bump	Stan	
2025	Heartbreak High	Netflix	
2025	Territory	Netflix	
2025	The Newsreader	ABC	
2025	The Twelve	Binge/Foxtel	

== Multiple wins ==
Number	Program
Wins
3	SeaChange
3	The Secret Life of Us
3	Love My Way
3	Wentworth
2	Phoenix
2	Underbelly
2	Redfern Now

== See also ==
- Logie Award for Most Popular Comedy Program
- Logie Award for Most Outstanding Comedy Program
