= Logie Award for Most Outstanding Comedy Program =

- Country: Australia
- Presented by: TV Week
- First award: 1967
- Website: www.tvweeklogieawards.com.au

The Silver Logie for Most Outstanding Comedy Program is an award presented annually at the Australian TV Week Logie Awards. The award is given to recognise an outstanding Australian comedy series. The winner and nominees of this award are chosen by television industry juries.

It was first awarded at the 9th Annual TV Week Logie Awards ceremony, held in 1967 as Best Comedy. The award was renamed many times in subsequent ceremonies; Best Australian Comedy (1968, 1972-1974), Best Comedy Show (1969), Best Comedy (1970). This award category was eliminated in 1975.

The category was reinstated as the Most Outstanding Achievement in Comedy Program in 1998 but in 1999, the category was dropped. From 2000, the award category was restored as Most Outstanding Comedy Program. In 2010, the category changed to Most Outstanding Light Entertainment Program which included comedy panel, talent and variety shows. From 2015, the category was split into Most Outstanding Entertainment Program and a reinstated Most Outstanding Comedy Program category. This award category was eliminated again in 2018.

== Winners and nominees ==
Key	Meaning
‡	Indicates the winning program

Listed below are the winners of the award for each year for Best Australian Comedy.

Year	Program	Network	Ref
1967	My Name's McGooley, What's Yours?‡	Seven Network	
1968	My Name's McGooley, What's Yours?‡	Seven Network	
1969	I've Married A Bachelor‡	ABC	
1971	Noel Ferrier's Australia A-Z‡	ABC	
1972	The Group‡	Nine Network	
1973	The Godfathers‡	Seven Network	
1974	The Aunty Jack Show‡	ABC	

Listed below are the winners of the award for each year for Most Outstanding Comedy Program.

Year	Program	Network	Ref
1998	Frontline‡	ABC	
1998	McFeast	ABC	
1998	Club Buggery	ABC	
2000	The Micallef Program‡	ABC	
2000	BackBerner	ABC	
2000	Good News Week	ABC	
2000	The Panel	Network Ten	
2001	The Games‡	ABC	
2001	The Panel	Network Ten	
2001	The Dream with Roy and HG	Seven Network	
2001	Pizza	SBS	
2002	The Micallef Program‡	Network Ten	
2002	The Panel	Network Ten	
2002	Rove Live	Network Ten	
2002	Pizza	SBS	
2002	The Election Chaser	ABC	
2002	The Monday Dump	Seven Network	
2003	Kath & Kim‡	ABC	
2003	CNNNN	ABC	
2003	The Ice Dream with Roy and HG	Seven Network	
2003	Russell Coight's All Aussie Adventures	Network Ten	
2003	John Safran's Music Jamboree	ABC	
2004	Kath & Kim‡	ABC	
2004	CNNNN‡	ABC	
2004	The Glass House	ABC	
2004	Pizza	SBS	
2004	An Audience with Dame Edna	The Comedy Channel	
2005	The Chaser Decides‡	ABC	
2005	Pizza	SBS	
2005	Kath & Kim	ABC	
2005	Derrick	The Comedy Channel	
2005	John Safran vs God	SBS	
2006	We Can Be Heroes‡	ABC	
2006	The Glass House	ABC	
2006	Spicks & Specks	ABC	
2006	The Ronnie Johns Half Hour	Network Ten	
2006	Comedy Inc.: The Late Shift	Nine Network	
2007	Thank God You're Here‡	Network Ten	
2007	The Glass House	ABC	
2007	Spicks & Specks	ABC	
2007	The Chaser's War On Everything	ABC	
2007	Stupid, Stupid Man	TV1	
2008	Summer Heights High‡	ABC1	
2008	Thank God You're Here	Network Ten	
2008	Kath & Kim	Seven Network	
2008	The Chaser's War On Everything	ABC	
2008	Wilfred	SBS	
2009	The Hollowmen‡	ABC	
2009	Very Small Business	ABC1	
2009	Review with Myles Barlow	ABC1	
2009	Mark Loves Sharon	Network Ten	
2009	Mr Firth Goes To Washington	SBS	

From 2010 to 2014, comedy nominees were included in the Most Outstanding Light Entertainment Program category.

Year	Program	Network	Ref
2015	Utopia‡	ABC	
2015	Upper Middle Bogan	ABC	
2015	Black Comedy	ABC1	
2015	Please Like Me	ABC2	
2015	Legally Brown	SBS	
2016	Shaun Micallef's Mad as Hell‡	ABC	
2016	Please Like Me	ABC2	
2016	Utopia	ABC	
2016	No Activity	Stan	
2016	Open Slather	The Comedy Channel	
2017	Please Like Me‡	ABC	
2017	Upper Middle Bogan	ABC	
2017	Shaun Micallef's Mad as Hell	ABC	
2017	Rosehaven	ABC	
2017	Black Comedy	ABC	

From 2018 to 2022, comedy nominees were included in the Most Outstanding Entertainment Program category.

Year	Program	Network	Ref
2023	Colin From Accounts‡	Binge	
2023	Fisk	ABC	
2023	Have You Been Paying Attention?	Network Ten	
2023	Shaun Micallef's Mad as Hell	ABC	
2023	Summer Love	ABC	
2023	Taskmaster Australia	Network Ten	

== Multiple wins ==
Wins
Number	Program
2	My Name's McGooley, What's Yours?
2	The Micallef Program
2	Kath & Kim

== See also ==
- Logie Award for Most Popular Comedy Program
- Logie Award for Most Popular Entertainment Program
- Logie Award for Most Outstanding Drama Series
