= Logie Award for Most Popular Live Show =

- Country: Australia
- Presented by: TV Week
- First award: 1966
- Final award: 1967
- Website: www.tvweeklogieawards.com.au

The Logie for Most Popular Live Show was an award presented at the Australian TV Week Logie Awards. It was first awarded at the 8th Annual TV Week Logie Awards ceremony, held in 1966, as a replacement for the Most Popular Program category. However, this award category was eliminated in 1968 and the Most Popular Program category was reintroduced.

== States ==
Key	Meaning
‡	Indicates the winning program

=== New South Wales ===
Year	Program	Network	Ref
1966	Tonight with Don Lane‡	Nine Network	
1967	Tonight with Don Lane‡	Nine Network	

=== Queensland ===
Year	Program	Network	Ref
1966	Theatre Royal‡	Nine Network	
1967	Theatre Royal‡	Nine Network	

=== South Australia ===
Year	Program	Network	Ref
1966	Adelaide Tonight‡	Nine Network	
1967	Adelaide Tonight‡	Nine Network	

=== Tasmania ===
Year	Program	Network	Ref
1966	Anything Goes‡	Nine Network	
1967	Line-Up‡	ABC	

=== Victoria ===
Year	Program	Network	Ref
1966	In Melbourne Tonight‡	Nine Network	
1967	In Melbourne Tonight‡	Nine Network	
