= Logie Awards of 1960 =

2nd Logie Awards
- Date: January 1960
- Site: Savoy Private Hotel, Brighton, Melbourne
- Hosted by: Hugh O'Brian
- Gold Logie: Graham Kennedy

Television coverage
- Network: IMT (GTV-9)

The 2nd Annual TV Week Logie Awards were presented in January 1960 at the Savoy Private Hotel in Melbourne. The awards were not televised and were only awarded for Melbourne television, as all major cities had different stations. American actor Hugh O'Brian was the guest host and presented some awards on Graham Kennedy's light entertainment variety show In Melbourne Tonight.

Following the awards in this year, Kennedy who won the "Star of the Year" award coined the ceremony the "Logie Awards" as a tribute to honour Scottish engineer and innovator John Logie Baird who contributed to the development of television as a practical medium. This article lists the winners of Logie Awards (Australian television) for 1960:

== Awards ==
=== Star of the Year (Gold Logie) ===
Winner:

Graham Kennedy

=== Other Awards ===
Program of the Year
Winner:

77 Sunset Strip, GTV9

TV Highlight of 1959
Winner:

Shell Presents series, GTV9

TV WEEK Special Award
Winner:

GTV9/ATN7 Interstate TV Link for Test Cricket

=== Australian Broadcasting Commission ===
Best Male Personality
Winner:

John Royle

Best Female Personality
Winner:

Ruth Nye

Best Program
Winner:

The Phil Silvers Show

=== Seven Network ===
Best Male Personality
Winner:

Don Bennetts

Best Female Personality
Winner:

Brenda Marshall

Best Program
Winner:

Father Knows Best

=== Nine Network ===
Best Male Personality
Winner:

Graham Kennedy

Best Female Personality
Winner:

Panda Lisner

Best Program
Winner:

In Melbourne Tonight
