= Logie Awards =

Annual Australian television awards

- Current: Logie Awards of 2026
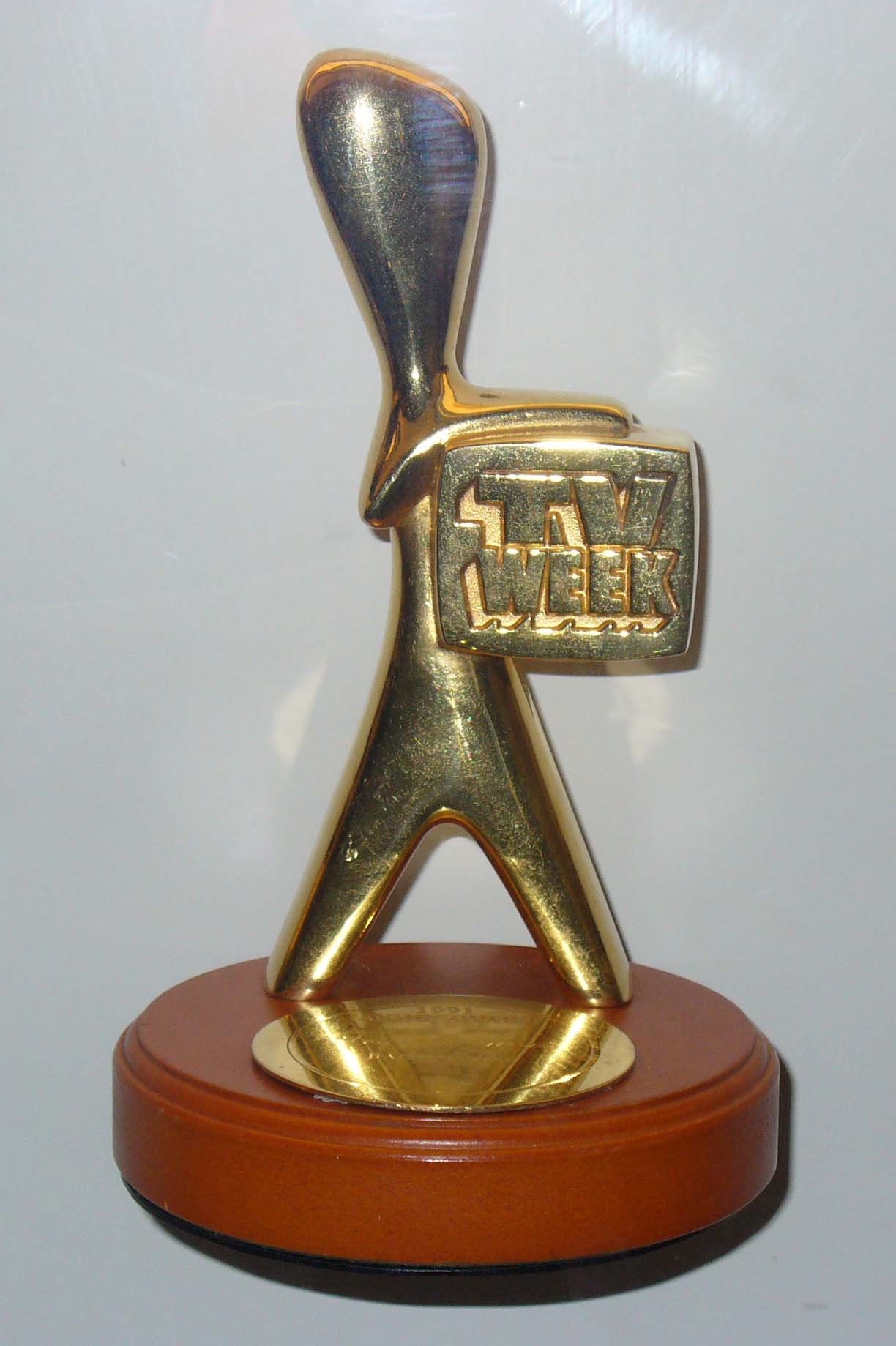
- Gold Logie Award statuette
- Awarded for: Excellence in Australian television
- Sponsored by: TV Week
- Location: Sydney, Australia
- Country: Australia
- Presented by: TV Week
- First award: 1959; 67 years ago (as The TV Week Awards)
- Website: tvweeklogies.com.au

Television/radio coverage
- Network: Nine Network (1959–2022); ABC (1961–1965); Seven Network (1989–1995, 2023–present); Network Ten (1981–1993)
- Runtime: 3 hours+

The Logie Awards (officially the TV Week Logie Awards; colloquially known as The Logies) is an annual ceremony celebrating and honouring the best shows and stars in Australian television, sponsored and organised by the magazine TV Week. The event is telecast live and billed as "television's night of nights". The first ceremony was hosted in 1959 as the TV Week Awards.

The Gold Logie is the most prestigious award and the industry's highest honour; it's awarded to the Most Popular Personality on Australian Television for the previous year. The award receives much publicity and media attention. Awards are presented in 20 categories, representing both industry and public voted prizes.

The event has been strongly associated with the Nine Network, who have hosted the ceremony on the most occasions, and TV and former radio personality Bert Newton, particularly in the early days, who served as a solo host of the ceremony on 17 occasions, with a constant run from 1966 until 1980 and as co-host on three other occasions. Over the years, the Logies have been hosted in Melbourne and Sydney. From 2018 to 2022, the ceremony was held on the Gold Coast before the 2023 ceremony was announced as moving to Sydney for the first time in 37 years.

== History ==
Known from their inception as the TV Week Awards, the awards were instigated by TV Week magazine with the first voting coupons provided in the magazine in late 1958, two years after the introduction of television in Australia. The first awards were presented on 15 January 1959 on an episode of In Melbourne Tonight. Only Melbourne television personalities were nominated and awards were given in eight categories, including two for American programs.

The most prestigious award in 1959 was Star of the Year presented to IMT host Graham Kennedy. The following year, Kennedy coined the name Logie Awards, to honour the Scottish engineer and innovator who contributed to the development of television as a practical medium, John Logie Baird.

The Logie statuette was designed by Alec De Lacy, chief designer for Melbourne-based trophy makers KG Luke Ltd. The first Gold Logie, the equivalent of the Star of the Year Award, was presented in 1960, and again won by Graham Kennedy. The record for most "Gold Logie" wins—at five apiece—is a tie between Kennedy and Ray Martin.

The 2020 and 2021 ceremonies were cancelled due to the COVID-19 pandemic.

== Logie institutions and milestones ==
Year	Event
1960	The ceremony, instituted the previous year as the TV Week Star Awards, now officially becomes known as "Logie Awards", in reference as an honour to TV inventor/engineer John Logie Baird, the name is chosen by entertainer Graham Kennedy, after he won what was known the previous previously year as the "Star of the Year Award", which itself would become the Gold Logie.
1961	The awards ceremony is televised for the first time, with the ABC screening the first half-hour of the awards in Sydney.
1962	Australian variety presenter, singer and actress Lorrae Desmond, later best known for her role in serial A Country Practice, becomes the first female star to win a Gold Logie, for her music variety program The Lorrae Desmond Show.
1963	The planned televised ceremony was cancelled due to the intended host, Tony Hancock cancelling a trip to Australia.
1968	There was no award for the Most Popular Female in Television. According to Bert Newton, who was hosting that year, "it appears no one was deemed worthy enough to receive it". He pleaded with the producers to never be put in that position again.
1973	The media was invited for the first time to attend the Logies.
1974	Number 96 star Pat McDonald became the first "soap star" actress (not television personality) to win the Gold Logie.
1975	The Logie Awards are broadcast in colour for the first time.
1976	The first and only fictional character to win a Logie of any kind was Norman Gunston, who won the Gold Logie, with his portrayer Garry McDonald, accepting the award in character.
1981	The Logie Awards after being held in Melbourne for 20 years return to Sydney and are broadcast for the first time on Network Ten.
1984	The Hall of Fame Logie was introduced by TV Week, awarded to recognise outstanding and continued contribution to television by an individual or program with the first induction being television pioneer and producer Hector Crawford (see below, under Logie Hall of Fame).
1988	Actress and future international pop star Kylie Minogue became the youngest person to win a Gold Logie, aged 19 for her role as Charlene Robinson in soap opera Neighbours.
1989	The Seven Network screens the Logie Awards for the first time.
1997	Agro's Cartoon Connection won its seventh consecutive Logie Award for Most Popular Children's Program, ending the longest undefeated streak of the Logies of either show or person.
2010	Actor Ray Meagher became the oldest person to win an award, at age 66, for his portrayal of Alf Stewart in Home and Away.
2006	A new Logies category was introduced, named the Graham Kennedy Award for Most Outstanding Newcomer, to honour Kennedy's career and legacy and to commemorate the 50th year of continued broadcasting of television in Australia.
2016	The Logies accepted for the first time nominations from locally produced digital content. Also in 2016, presenter Waleed Aly (whose parents were born in Egypt) became the first non-Caucasian person to win the Gold Logie.
2017	TV Week announced that after 30 years, the awards ceremony will no longer be held in Melbourne, due to the withdrawal of financial support by the Victorian government. The Logie awards ceremony will be instead held at The Star Gold Coast on the Gold Coast, Queensland for four years, with support of the Queensland Government. The decade of the 2010s was the first decade where no one won the Gold Logie award more than once.
2020	It was announced on the 29 April that the Logie Awards scheduled for 28 June 2020, were being cancelled outright prior to any voting or nominations taking place, due to the COVID-19 pandemic. The ceremony was set to return on 28 November 2021, but was again cancelled on 4 September 2021. It later took place on 19 June 2022.
2022	The Logie Award for Most Popular Presenter is renamed as the Bert Newton Award for Most Popular Presenter, in tribute to Bert Newton, a television personality and presenter who was a Hall of Fame inductee.
2023	The first time that an Indigenous person, Mark Coles Smith, was nominated for the Gold Logie. Kween Kong from RuPaul's Drag Race Down Under, became the first drag queen nominated for a Logie. 6 of the nominees for Most Outstanding Actress are from a subscription television network.
2024	The Logies announced a major overhaul of award categories for the 2024 ceremony. Whilst the Gold Logie Award, Bert Newton Award for Most Popular Presenter and Graham Kennedy Award for Most Popular New Talent will remain publicly voted, the previous most popular and most outstanding categories will be replaced by a "best" category which will be determined using a combined score from a jury, viewing data and public voting. The acting awards will be separated into drama and comedy categories, whilst the drama and miniseries category will also be separated. The new category format is more similar to the style used in the United States Emmy Awards.
2025	Actress Lynne McGranger became the oldest person to win an award, at age 72, for her portrayal of Irene Roberts in Home and Away, after announcing her exit from the long-running drama series, bringing an end to her 32-year stint. The 2025 Logie Awards featured a majority of women with only one male nominee.
2026	Conservationist and presenter Robert Irwin became the youngest person to host the Logie Awards, at age 22. A new awards category was introduced, named the Bruce McAvaney Award for Most Popular Sports Presenter, to honour McAvaney's career and legacy.

== Logie Hall of Fame ==
The prestigious Logie Hall of Fame was first introduced in 1984; former conductor, turned television producer and pioneer and founder of Crawford Productions, Hector Crawford was the first inductee. The induction was a posthumous honour for TV cameraman Neil Davis, actor Maurie Fields, conservationist Steve Irwin, news anchor Brian Naylor, journalist Peter Harvey and television executive Brian Walsh.

Magda Szubanski was only the fifth woman to be inducted into the Hall of Fame, after former recipients Ruth Cracknell, Noni Hazlehurst, Kerri-Anne Kennerley and Rebecca Gibney. The Logies have been criticised for its lack of women inductees in the category.

=== TV programs ===
Four Corners (1961–)
Neighbours (1985–2022; 2023–2025)
Play School (1966–)
Home and Away (1988–)
60 Minutes (1979–)
A Country Practice (1981–1994)

These are the only programs that have been inducted into the Hall of Fame.

== Nomination and voting procedures ==
=== Public voting ===
Voting for the Most Popular Logie categories is done using an online form, or by SMS (short message service) voting for the final nominees. Ten of the Logie Award categories are fan awards. In the past, the "Most Popular" Logies categories were voted by the readers of TV Week magazine using a coupon.

SMS (short message service) voting was introduced in 2006 for the Gold Logie. In 2008, Internet votes could be cast for the first time without having to buy a copy of the TV Week magazine.

Before 2018, public voting usually lasted for four weeks, beginning in December or January, while the ceremony itself was in late April or early May. Since 2018, voting begins in March and the ceremony is held in July.

=== Industry voting ===
The Most Outstanding categories are voted on by a jury comprising members of the Australian TV industry peers. There were 15 categories in the industry awards at the Logie Awards of 2018.

== Eligibility ==
To be eligible to receive a Logie, a program must be Australian produced, set in Australia and have a predominantly Australian cast. Although in other years there has been a Logie for overseas programs, these awards are no longer part of the awards. People eligible for a Logie must have appeared on an Australian-produced show that was broadcast on Australian television in the previous year.

There are long-held suspicions that network publicists engage in mass voting to rig the results. However, no hard evidence had emerged for this, other than the experiment by the satirical newspaper The Chaser, who attempted to have low-profile SBS newsreader Anton Enus nominated for the Gold Logie. They did so by getting their small readership to buy copies of TV Week and vote for Enus for the award. While the attempt failed (they came "reasonably close", to earning a nomination for Enus, according to a "TV Week Insider"), their failure gives some cause for the widespread derision in the industry (particularly the 'quality' end) towards the popular-vote awards.

Community television, Channel 31, personalities and shows are eligible for nomination for Logies, however since their audiences are far smaller than those of the commercial channels and public broadcasters, they are at a tremendous disadvantage. For a time they had their own community television awards, known as the Antenna Awards. Despite this, in 2009 the Logies were dogged by minor controversy after organisers refused to allow an acclaimed community television show, The Bazura Project, to be nominated in the category of Outstanding Comedy Show, stating "As TV Week does not cover community television within the magazine, we are unable to consider individual programs on this platform." The ABC's Media Watch program first reported the story on Monday 9 March 2009, with many media outlets covering the growing support for the community television program since.

== Logies ceremonies by year ==
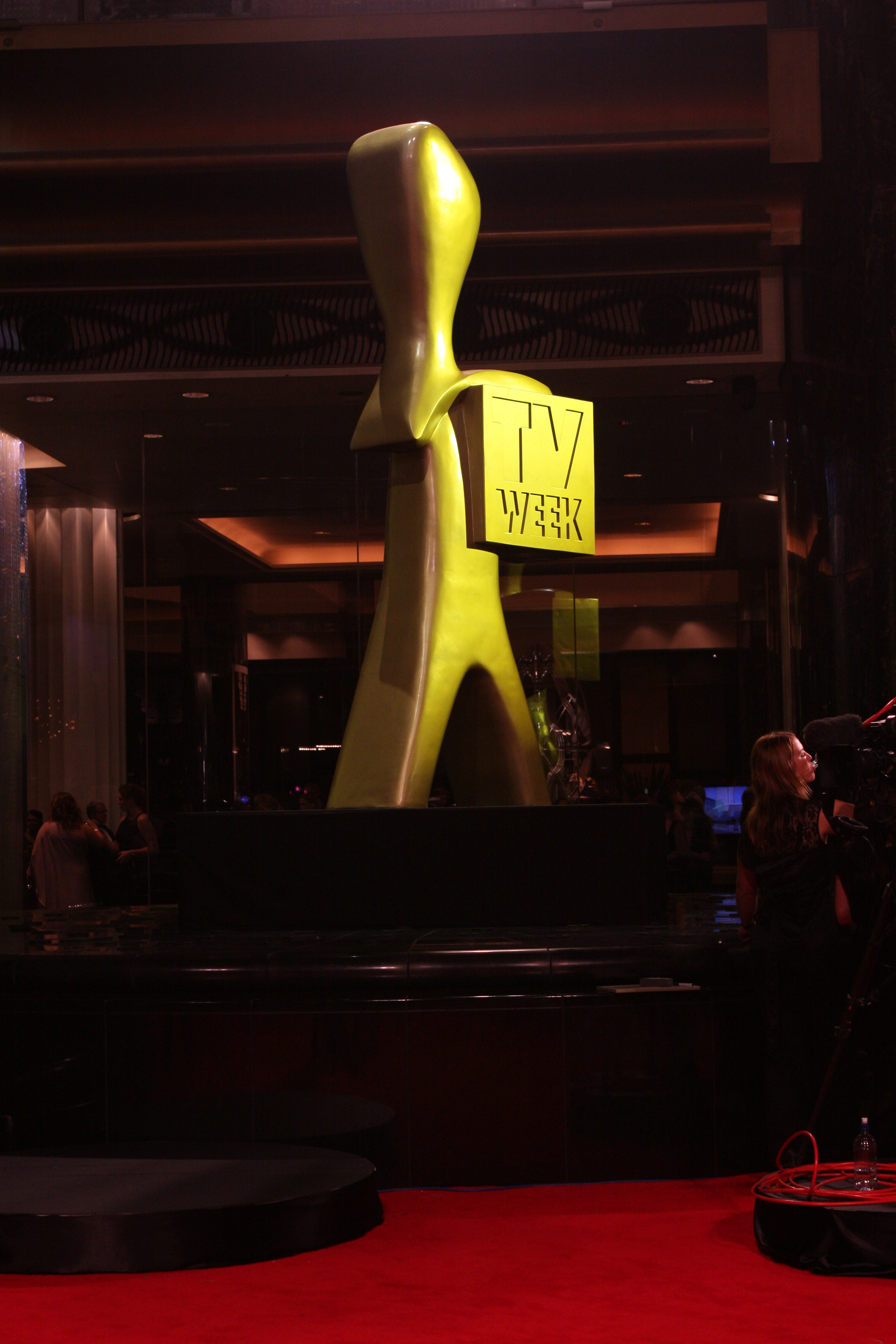
Logies 2011 ceremony

Year	Gold Logie winner(s)	Venue	Host	Broadcaster
1959	Graham Kennedy; Panda Lisner	Awards presented on In Melbourne Tonight	Graham Kennedy; Guest Presenter – Googie Withers	GTV-9
1960	Graham Kennedy	Brighton Savoy Hotel, Brighton, Melbourne	Hugh O'Brian	GTV-9
1961	Bob Dyer	Chevron-Hilton Hotel, Sydney	Jimmy Edwards	ABN-2 (ABC)
1962	Lorrae Desmond; Tommy Hanlon, Jr.	Chevron Hotel, Melbourne	Gerald Lyons; Awards Presented by Bob Dyer	ABN-2 (ABC)
1963	Michael Charlton	On board cruise liner Changsha. Originally to have been Chevron-Hilton Hotel, Sydney.	Originally to have been Tony Hancock with Marie McDonald	Originally to have been ABC
1964	Bobby Limb	On board the Lloyd Triestino cruise liner Marconi		Nine Network
1965	Jimmy Hannan	Palais De Dance, Melbourne	Gerald Lyons	ABC
1966	Gordon Chater	Southern Cross Hotel, Melbourne	Bert Newton	Nine Network
1967	Graham Kennedy; Hazel Phillips	Zodiac Room on board cruise liner the Fairstar	Bert Newton	Nine Network
1968	Brian Henderson	Southern Cross Hotel, Melbourne	Bert Newton	Nine Network
1969	Graham Kennedy	Southern Cross Hotel, Melbourne	Bert Newton	Nine Network
1970	Barry Crocker; Maggie Tabberer	Southern Cross Hotel, Melbourne	Bert Newton	Nine Network
1971	Gerard Kennedy; Maggie Tabberer	Southern Cross Hotel, Melbourne	Bert Newton	Nine Network
1972	Gerard Kennedy	Southern Cross Hotel, Melbourne	Bert Newton	Nine Network
1973	Tony Barber	Southern Cross Hotel, Melbourne	Bert Newton	Nine Network
1974	Graham Kennedy; Pat McDonald	Southern Cross Hotel, Melbourne	Bert Newton	Nine Network
1975	Ernie Sigley; Denise Drysdale	Southern Cross Hotel, Melbourne	Bert Newton	Nine Network
1976	Norman Gunston; Denise Drysdale	Southern Cross Hotel, Melbourne	Bert Newton	Nine Network
1977	Don Lane; Jeanne Little	Southern Cross Hotel, Melbourne	Bert Newton	Nine Network
1978	Graham Kennedy	Southern Cross Hotel, Melbourne	Bert Newton	Nine Network
1979	Bert Newton	Hilton Hotel, Melbourne	Bert Newton	Nine Network
1980	Mike Walsh	Hilton Hotel, Melbourne	Bert Newton	Nine Network
1981	Bert Newton	Centrepoint Convention Centre, Sydney	Michael Parkinson	Network Ten
1982	Bert Newton	Hilton Hotel, Melbourne	Bert Newton	Nine Network
1983	Daryl Somers	Wentworth Regent Hotel, Melbourne	Mike Willesee	Network Ten
1984	Bert Newton	Hilton Hotel Melbourne	Bert Newton	Nine Network
1985	Rowena Wallace	World Trade Centre, Melbourne	Greg Evans	Network Ten
1986	Daryl Somers	State Theatre, Sydney	Mike Willesee	Nine Network
1987	Ray Martin	Hyatt on Collins, Melbourne	Don Lane	Network Ten
1988	Kylie Minogue	Hyatt on Collins, Melbourne	Daryl Somers	Nine Network
1989	Daryl Somers	Hyatt on Collins, Melbourne	Bert Newton	Seven Network
1990	Craig McLachlan	Hyatt on Collins, Melbourne	Mark Mitchell	Network Ten
1991	Steve Vizard	World Congress Centre, Melbourne	Daryl Somers	Nine Network
1992	Jana Wendt	Radisson President Hotel, Melbourne	Steve Vizard	Seven Network
1993	Ray Martin	Grand Hyatt, Melbourne	Bert Newton	Network Ten
1994	Ray Martin	World Congress Centre, Melbourne	Ray Martin	Nine Network
1995	Ray Martin	Concert Hall, Melbourne	Andrew Daddo; Noni Hazlehurst	Seven Network
1996	Ray Martin	Melbourne Park Centre, Melbourne	Daryl Somers	Nine Network
1997	Lisa McCune	The Palladium Room, Crown Towers, Melbourne	Daryl Somers	Nine Network
1998	Lisa McCune	The Palladium Room, Crown Towers, Melbourne	Daryl Somers	Nine Network
1999	Lisa McCune	The Palladium Room, Crown Towers, Melbourne	Andrew Denton	Nine Network
2000	Lisa McCune	The Palladium Room, Crown Towers, Melbourne	Andrew Denton	Nine Network
2001	Georgie Parker	The Palladium Room, Crown Towers, Melbourne	Shaun Micallef	Nine Network
2002	Georgie Parker	The Palladium Room, Crown Towers, Melbourne	Wendy Harmer	Nine Network
2003	Rove McManus	The Palladium Room, Crown Towers, Melbourne	Eddie McGuire	Nine Network
2004	Rove McManus	The Palladium Room, Crown Towers, Melbourne	Eddie McGuire	Nine Network
2005	Rove McManus	The Palladium Room, Crown Towers, Melbourne	Eddie McGuire; Rove McManus; Andrew O'Keefe	Nine Network
2006	John Wood	The Palladium Room, Crown Towers, Melbourne	Bert Newton; Ray Martin; Daryl Somers; Lisa McCune; Georgie Parker	Nine Network
2007	Kate Ritchie	The Palladium Room, Crown Towers, Melbourne	Adam Hills; Dave Hughes; Fifi Box	Nine Network
2008	Kate Ritchie	The Palladium Room, Crown Towers, Melbourne	No host. Only a series of presenters.	Nine Network
2009	Rebecca Gibney	The Palladium Room, Crown Towers, Melbourne	Gretel Killeen	Nine Network
2010	Ray Meagher	The Palladium Room, Crown Towers, Melbourne	Bert Newton	Nine Network
2011	Karl Stefanovic	The Palladium Room, Crown Towers, Melbourne	Shane Bourne	Nine Network
2012	Hamish Blake	The Palladium Room, Crown Towers, Melbourne	No host. Only a series of presenters.	Nine Network
2013	Asher Keddie	The Palladium Room, Crown Towers, Melbourne	No host. Only a series of presenters.	Nine Network
2014	Scott Cam	The Palladium Room, Crown Towers, Melbourne	No host. Only a series of presenters.	Nine Network
2015	Carrie Bickmore	The Palladium Room, Crown Towers, Melbourne	No host. Only a series of presenters.	Nine Network
2016	Waleed Aly	The Palladium Room, Crown Towers, Melbourne	No host. Only a series of presenters.	Nine Network
2017	Samuel Johnson	The Palladium Room, Crown Towers, Melbourne	No host. Only a series of presenters.	Nine Network
2018	Grant Denyer	The Star, Gold Coast	No host. Only a series of presenters.	Nine Network
2019	Tom Gleeson	The Star, Gold Coast	No host. Only a series of presenters.	Nine Network
2022	Hamish Blake	Gold Coast Convention and Exhibition Centre	No host. Only a series of presenters.	Nine Network
2023	Sonia Kruger	The Star, Sydney	Sam Pang	Seven Network
2024	Larry Emdur	The Star, Sydney	Sam Pang	Seven Network
2025	Lynne McGranger	The Star, Sydney	Sam Pang	Seven Network
2026	Sam Pang	The Star, Sydney	Robert Irwin	Seven Network

== Awards ceremony ==
The Logie Awards ceremony is televised and became generally more elaborate as years went by. The awards have mostly been held in a ballroom, rather than a theatre, which is common for the Emmy Awards and Academy Awards. Dinner is served just before the ceremony and drinks are served during the ceremony.

Bert Newton, who has won the Gold Logie four times, hosted the awards a total of 19 times. GTV-9/Nine Network was strongly associated with the history of the Logies, having hosted the awards 46 times in their 60-year history.

The Seven Network has been the host broadcaster of the awards since 2023, after taking over from the Nine Network which had broadcast the previous 28 iterations, with Seven having last broadcast the Logie Awards in 1995.

== Controversies ==
In 1973, American actor Michael Cole generated controversy after accepting an award while apparently drunk, uttering the word "shit" in a short, incoherent acceptance speech. This was the first time such profanity had been said on Australian television. According to Bert Newton, Channel Nine received thousands of complaints about the use of the word, however, when it was edited for the repeat transmission Newton stated "they got double the calls complaining it had been dropped."

In 1979, during a notable appearance with Muhammad Ali as co-presenter, Newton made a comment "I like the boy!" (in reference to a series of TV advertisements Bert had recently done). Ali became upset at the comment, as the term "boy" carried negative racial connotations for many black Americans, although Newton was oblivious to this use of the term and claimed this was not his intention. After realising his faux pas, Newton quickly apologised to Ali on stage.

The most difficult guest to interact with, according to Newton, was Vic Morrow in 1967. He would just stand there saying nothing, silently handing out the Logies. According to Bert, "every so often, I'd say 'how are you going, Vic?' and he would just nod his head."

Grant Denyer's 2018 Gold Logie win has proved controversial with people believing he only won because of Tom Gleeson's campaign. Gleeson has shrugged off those suggestions.

Tom Gleeson's 2019 Gold Logie win has proved controversial with him not being so humble by the victory.

The trial of the man accused of raping Brittany Higgins was delayed because of comments from Lisa Wilkinson's acceptance speech.

Every year before public voting opens, major networks ABC, SBS, Seven, Nine, and 10 are restricted in the number of personalities and programs they can submit for consideration in the publicly voted category, including up to 10 names in both the Most Popular Actor and Actress categories, 15 names for Most Popular Presenter and five programs for Most Popular Drama. These restrictions often are introduced over those who are not listed in the voting form, and as a result, they are not eligible to be nominated for an award.

== Live performers ==
Many local and overseas performers have appeared at the Logie Awards ceremony. While it had been a tradition to choose performers with a television connection, this has not always been the case.

In 2001, Ricky Martin was the headline performer. In 2002, Destiny's Child performed, with Elton John and Shakira making appearances. In 2004, it was Michael Bublé with Delta Goodrem. In 2011, Katy Perry performed and presented an award, while in 2012 One Direction and Delta Goodrem performed on the night with appearances from Flo Rida, Tony Bennett and Seal. In 2013, Bruno Mars performed and 2014, Ed Sheeran was the headline performer. In 2024, James Bay performed on the night.

== Award categories ==
=== Current categories ===
Year Introduced	Current Category	Former Categories
1960	Gold Logie Award for Most Popular Personality on Australian Television	
2003	Bert Newton Award for Most Popular Presenter	
1980	Graham Kennedy Award for Most Popular New Talent	Most Popular New Male Talent (1999–2013) Most Popular New Female Talent (1999–2013); George Wallace Memorial Logie for Best New Talent (1969–1977); Graham Kennedy Award for Most Outstanding Newcomer (2006–2017)
2024	Ray Martin Award for Most Popular News or Public Affairs Presenter	Most Outstanding News or Public Affairs Broadcaster
2024	Best Lead Actor in a Drama	Most Popular Actor (–2023) Most Outstanding Actor (–2023); Most Popular Actress (–2023); Most Outstanding Actress (–2023)
2024	Best Lead Actress in a Drama	Most Popular Actor (–2023) Most Outstanding Actor (–2023); Most Popular Actress (–2023); Most Outstanding Actress (–2023)
2024	Best Lead Actor in a Comedy	Most Popular Actor (–2023) Most Outstanding Actor (–2023); Most Popular Actress (–2023); Most Outstanding Actress (–2023)
2024	Best Lead Actress in a Comedy	Most Popular Actor (–2023) Most Outstanding Actor (–2023); Most Popular Actress (–2023); Most Outstanding Actress (–2023)
2024	Best Supporting Actor	Most Outstanding Supporting Actor (–2023)
2024	Best Supporting Actress	Most Outstanding Supporting Actress (–2023)
2024	Best Drama Program	Most Popular Drama Program (–2023) Most Outstanding Drama Series (–2023); Best Australian Drama (1961–1976)
2024	Best Miniseries or Telemovie	Most Outstanding Miniseries or Telemovie (–2023) Most Popular Telemovie or Miniseries
2024	Best Entertainment Program	Most Popular Entertainment Program (–2023) Most Outstanding Entertainment Program (–2023)
2024	Best Current Affairs Program	Most Popular Panel or Current Affairs Program (–2023) Best News Panel or Current Affairs Program (2016–2017); Most Outstanding Current Affairs Program
2024	Best Scripted Comedy	Most Popular Comedy Program (–2023) Most Outstanding Comedy Program (–2023)
2024	Best Comedy Entertainment Program	Most Popular Comedy Program (–2023) Most Outstanding Comedy Program (–2023)
2024	Best Competition Reality Program	Most Popular Reality Program (–2023) Most Outstanding Reality Program (–2023)
2024	Best Structured Reality Program	Most Popular Reality Program (–2023) Most Outstanding Reality Program (–2023)
2024	Best Lifestyle Program	Most Popular Lifestyle Program (–2023)
2024	Best News Coverage or Public Affairs Report	Most Outstanding News Coverage or Public Affairs Report (–2023) Most Outstanding News Coverage; Most Outstanding Public Affairs Report; Most Popular Public Affairs Program
2024	Best Factual or Documentary Program	Most Outstanding Factual or Documentary Program (–2023) Most Popular Factual Program (2008–2013, 2015–2017)
2024	Best Sports Coverage	Most Outstanding Sports Coverage (–2023) Most Popular Sports Program (1987–2017); Most Popular Sports Event
2024	Best Children's Program	Most Popular Children's Program (1983–1997) Most Outstanding Children's Program (2000–2023); Most Outstanding Children's Preschool Program (2004)
2026	Bruce McAvaney Award for Most Popular Sports Presenter	Most Outstanding Sports Broadcaster (1999)

"Most Popular" awards are given based on public votes for each category. "Best" awards are given based on judges scores (30%), audience data (20%) and public votes (50%).

Each year either an individual or a program is also inducted into the Logie Hall of Fame.

=== Other former categories ===
- Best Variety Show (1961–76)
- Most Popular Variety Program (1977–1985)
- Most Popular Australian Program (1961–2004)
- Most Popular Live Show (1966–1967)
- Most Popular Game Show (2002)
- Best Commercial (1962–1976)
- Most Popular Overseas Program (2003, 2005)
- Most Popular Overseas Drama (2004)
- Most Popular Overseas Comedy (2004)
- Most Popular Comedy Personality
- Most Popular Light Entertainment Personality
- Most Popular Commercial (1977–1978, 2019)

== Most wins ==
=== Programs ===
As of 2017, Home and Away is the most successful program in Logies history, having won 49 awards since it premiered in 1988. Neighbours is the second most successful having won 31 Logies since it began in 1985. A Country Practice follows as the third most successful program, having won 29 awards throughout its twelve-year run. Blue Heelers is fourth with 25 Logies.

=== People ===
Television personalities with the most national wins (excluding state-based Logie awards) are:

Rank	Name	Total wins	Awards Won
1	Rove McManus	10	3 Gold Logies (2003–05) and 7 consecutive Most Popular Presenter (2003–09)
2	Bert Newton	9	4 Gold Logies (1979, 1981, 1982, 1984), 4 Best Compere (1970, 1972–1974), Hall of Fame inductee (1988)
3	Graham Kennedy	8	6 Gold Logies (1959, 1960, 1967, 1969, 1974, 1978), 1 Special Gold Logie – Star of the Decade (1967), Hall of Fame inductee (1998), 10 state Logies
3	Daryl Somers	8	3 Gold Logies (1983, 1986, 1989), 3 Most Popular Light Entertainment Personality (1993, 1995–1997), 1 Most Popular Light Entertainment/Comedy Personality (1990) and 1 Most Popular Comedy Personality (1995)
3	Ray Martin	8	5 Gold Logies (1987, 1993–1996), 2 TV Reporter of the Year (1981, 1983), 1 Most Popular Light Entertainment Personality (1995)

Actors/actresses with the most national wins:

Rank	Name	Total wins	Awards Won
1	Lisa McCune	10	1 New Talent (1995), 5 Most Popular Actress (1996–2000) and 4 Gold Logies (1997–2000)
2	Georgie Parker	7	1 New Talent (1990), 4 Most Popular Actress (1991–1993, 2001), 2 Gold Logies (2001, 2002)
3	Asher Keddie	7	5 Most Popular Actress (2011–2015), 1 Most Outstanding Actress in a Series (2014), 1 Gold Logie (2013)
4	Kate Ritchie	5	2 Gold Logies (2007, 2008), 3 Most Popular Actress (2006–2008)
4	Martin Sacks	5	5 Most Popular Actor (1997–2001)

== See also ==
- Antenna Awards
- ASTRA Awards
- TV Week King of Pop Awards, TV Week/Countdown Music Awards
- List of television awards
