= Logie Awards of 2014 =

Australian television awards ceremony

56th Logie Awards
- Date: 27 April 2014
- Site: Crown Palladium, Melbourne, Victoria

Highlights
- Gold Logie: Scott Cam
- Hall of Fame: Peter Harvey
- Most awards: The Block, Home and Away and Offspring (2)
- Most nominations: Offspring (8)

Television coverage
- Network: Nine Network

The 56th Annual TV Week Logie Awards was held on Sunday 27 April 2014 at the Crown Palladium in Melbourne, and broadcast on the Nine Network. The red carpet arrivals was hosted by Sonia Kruger and Jules Lund.

Public voting for the Most Popular categories were conducted through an online survey from 3 February 2014 to 2 March 2014. Nominations were announced on 31 March 2014. Offspring received the most nominations with eight, followed by Home and Away with six. The Block, Hamish & Andy's Gap Year Asia, Paper Giants: Magazine Wars and Redfern Now each received four nominations.

== Background ==
=== Changes to categories ===
In January 2014, it was revealed that TV Week had eliminated some categories in a bid to shorten the ceremony. The categories for Most Popular New Male Talent and Most Popular New Female Talent were merged into the Most Popular New Talent category to become gender non-specific. The Most Popular Factual Program category was also eliminated and the Most Outstanding New Talent category was renamed Most Outstanding Newcomer.

=== Nominations announcements ===
Nominations were announced in two stages on 31 March 2014; the peer-voted Most Outstanding categories were published in the issue of TV Week that hit newsstands in the morning, while the Most Popular categories were announced in the afternoon at the nominations event in Melbourne, which was hosted by Julia Morris and Chris Brown and attended by network stars.

== Winners and nominees ==
In the tables below, winners are listed first and highlighted in bold.

=== Gold Logie ===
Most Popular Personality on Australian Television
- **Scott Cam in The Block (Nine Network)**
  - Carrie Bickmore in The Project (Network Ten)
  - Essie Davis in Miss Fisher's Murder Mysteries (ABC1)
  - Asher Keddie in Offspring (Network Ten)
  - Andy Lee in Hamish & Andy's Gap Year Asia (Nine Network)
  - Steve Peacocke in Home and Away (Seven Network)

=== Acting/Presenting ===
Most Popular Actor	Most Popular Actress
**Chris Lilley in Ja'mie: Private School Girl (ABC1)**; Dan Ewing in Home and Away (Seven Network); Matthew Le Nevez in Offspring (Network Ten); Steve Peacocke in Home and Away (Seven Network); Hugh Sheridan in Packed to the Rafters (Seven Network)	**Asher Keddie in Offspring (Network Ten)**; Essie Davis in Miss Fisher's Murder Mysteries (ABC1); Marta Dusseldorp in A Place to Call Home (Seven Network); Rebecca Gibney in Packed to the Rafters (Seven Network); Julia Morris in House Husbands (Nine Network)
Most Outstanding Actor	Most Outstanding Actress
**Lachy Hulme in Power Games: The Packer-Murdoch Story (Nine Network)**; Chris Lilley in Ja'mie: Private School Girl (ABC1); Craig McLachlan in The Doctor Blake Mysteries (ABC1); Kirk Page in Redfern Now (ABC1); David Wenham in Better Man (SBS One)	**Asher Keddie in Offspring (Network Ten)**; Danielle Cormack in Wentworth (SoHo); Claudia Karvan in The Time of Our Lives (ABC1); Mandy McElhinney in Paper Giants: Magazine Wars (ABC1); Kat Stewart in Offspring (Network Ten)
Most Popular New Talent	Graham Kennedy Award for Most Outstanding Newcomer
**Bonnie Sveen in Home and Away (Seven Network)**; Timomatic in Australia's Got Talent (Nine Network); Abby Earl in A Place to Call Home (Seven Network); Caren Pistorius in Offspring (Network Ten), Redfern Now and Paper Giants: Magazine Wars (ABC1); Johnny Ruffo in Home and Away (Seven Network)	**Remy Hii in Better Man (SBS One)**; Anna Bamford in Wonderland (Network Ten); Shareena Clanton in Wentworth (SoHo); Caren Pistorius in Paper Giants: Magazine Wars (ABC1); Meyne Wyatt in Redfern Now (ABC1)
Most Popular Presenter
**Scott Cam in The Block (Nine Network)**; Carrie Bickmore in The Project (Network Ten); Hamish Blake in Hamish & Andy's Gap Year Asia (Nine Network); Adam Hills in Adam Hills Tonight (ABC1); Andy Lee in Hamish & Andy's Gap Year Asia (Nine Network)

=== Most Popular Programs ===
Most Popular Drama Program	Most Popular Light Entertainment Program
**Home and Away (Seven Network)**; House Husbands (Nine Network); Miss Fisher's Murder Mysteries (ABC1); Offspring (Network Ten); Winners & Losers (Seven Network)	**Hamish & Andy's Gap Year Asia (Nine Network)**; Ja'mie: Private School Girl (ABC1); The Project (Network Ten); The Voice (Nine Network); The X Factor (Seven Network)
Most Popular Reality Program	Most Popular Sports Program
**My Kitchen Rules (Seven Network)**; Big Brother (Nine Network); The Block All Stars (Nine Network); The Block Sky High (Nine Network); Bondi Rescue (Network Ten)	**The NRL Footy Show (Nine Network)**; The AFL Footy Show (Nine Network); Before the Game (Network Ten); The Cricket Show (Nine Network); Wide World of Sports (Nine Network)
Most Popular Lifestyle Program
**Better Homes and Gardens (Seven Network)**; Domestic Blitz: The Block to the Rescue (Nine Network); Embarrassing Bodies Down Under (LifeStyle You); The Living Room (Network Ten); Selling Houses Australia (The LifeStyle Channel)

=== Most Outstanding Programs ===
Most Outstanding Drama Series	Most Outstanding Miniseries or Telemovie
**Redfern Now (ABC1)**; A Place to Call Home (Seven Network); Offspring (Network Ten); The Time of Our Lives (ABC1); Wentworth (SoHo)	**Top of the Lake (UKTV)**; An Accidental Soldier (ABC1); Better Man (SBS One); Paper Giants: Magazine Wars (ABC1); Power Games: The Packer-Murdoch War (Nine Network)
Most Outstanding Light Entertainment Program	Most Outstanding Children's Program
**Housos (SBS One)**; It's a Date (ABC1); Please Like Me (ABC2); The Voice (Nine Network); Upper Middle Bogan (ABC1)	**Nowhere Boys (ABC3)**; Dance Academy (ABC3); Move It Mob Style (NITV); Play Along with Sam (Nick Jr.); Play School (ABC 4 Kids)
Most Outstanding News Coverage	Most Outstanding Public Affairs Report
**"NSW Bushfires", Nine News (Nine Network)**; "Crisis in Cairo" — Brett Mason, World News Australia (SBS One); "Leadership Spill" (Sky News); "Missing the Boat" – Jaymes Diaz interview, Ten Eyewitness News (Network Ten); "The Dark Side of the Force", Seven News (Seven Network)	**"Prisoner X" — The Australian Connection, Foreign Correspondent (ABC1)**; "A Gracious Gift", Four Corners (ABC1); "Drugs in Sport" — Stephen Dank, 7.30 (ABC1); "Manus Island", Dateline (SBS One); "Prime Suspect", Sunday Night (Seven Network)
Most Outstanding Sports Coverage	Most Outstanding Factual Program
**2013 Emirates Melbourne Cup Carnival (Seven Network)**; 2013 NRL Grand Final (Nine Network); 2013 Toyota AFL Grand Final (Seven Network); The Ashes Cricket — Australia v England (Nine Network); Tour de France (SBS One)	**Kings Cross ER: St Vincent's Hospital (Crime & Investigation Network)**; Desert War (ABC1); Dirty Business (SBS One); Jabbed (SBS One); Redesign My Brain (ABC1)

== Performers ==
- Jason Derulo – "Trumpets" / "In My Head" / "The Other Side" / "Talk Dirty"
- Ed Sheeran – "Sing"
- Kylie Minogue – "I Was Gonna Cancel"
- John Newman – "Love Me Again"
- Tina Arena – "Only Lonely" (In Memoriam tribute)
- MKTO – "Thank You"

== Presenters ==
- Hamish Blake and Andy Lee
- Julia Morris
- Lincoln Lewis
- Dave Hughes
- Noni Hazlehurst
- Lisa Wilkinson
- Craig McLachlan
- Luke Jacobz
- Darren McMullen
- Shane Jacobson
- Jessica Marais
- Samantha Armytage
- Gyton Grantley
- Tina Arena
- Emma Alberici
- Jennifer Hawkins
- Patrick Brammall
- Amanda Keller
- Eddie McGuire
- Richard Wilkins
- Kylie Minogue – Gold Logie for Most Popular Personality on Australian Television

== Most nominations ==
By network

- ABC – 30
- Nine Network – 24
- Seven Network – 19
- Network Ten – 16
- SBS – 10
- Foxtel – 7

By program

- Offspring (Network Ten) – 8
- Home and Away (Seven Network) – 6
- The Block (Nine Network) / Hamish & Andy's Gap Year Asia (Nine Network) / Paper Giants: Magazine Wars (ABC1) / Redfern Now (ABC1) – 4
- A Place to Call Home (Seven Network) / Better Man (SBS One) / Ja'mie: Private School Girl (ABC1) / Miss Fisher's Murder Mysteries (ABC1) / The Project (Network Ten) / Wentworth (SoHo) – 3

== In Memoriam ==
The In Memoriam segment was introduced by Noni Hazlehurst. Tina Arena performed a cover version of Bon Jovi's "Only Lonely". The following deceased were honoured:

- Wendy Hughes, actress
- Bill Peach AM, presenter
- Anthony Hawkins, actor
- Alan Coleman, executive producer
- Jonathan Dawson, writer, director
- Billy Raymond, entertainer
- Steve Millichamp, actor
- Mia Tolhurst, scriptwriter
- Nick Eade, producer
- Elke Neidhardt AM, actress
- Johnny Lockwood, actor
- Penne Hackforth-Jones, actress
- Barbara Callcott, actress
- Peter Benardos, director
- Everett De Roche, writer
- Ian Law, executive
- Graeme McNamara, stage manager
- Don Smith, OB manager
- Russ Sefton, executive
- George Burnham, cameraman
- Doug Murray, presenter
- Bob Moore, presenter
- Don Reid, actor
- Joyce Jacobs, actress
- Maureen Duval, presenter
- Brian Moll, actor
- Julian Jover, producer
- Bob Henderson, cameraman
- Ken Chown, producer
- Andrew Plain, sound designer
- Ian Frykberg, executive
- Allan Kendall, producer
- James Condon, actor
- Roy Higgins MBE, presenter
- Charlotte Dawson, presenter

== See also ==
- Logie Awards
