= Logie Award for Most Outstanding Actress =

Television award category

- Country: Australia
- Presented by: TV Week
- First award: 1988
- Currently held by: Harriet Dyer (2023)

Highlights
- Most awards: Deborah Mailman (4)
- Website: www.tvweeklogieawards.com.au

The Logie Award for Most Outstanding Actress, commonly known as the Silver Logie for Most Outstanding Actress, is an award presented annually at the Australian TV Week Logie Awards. It was first awarded at the 30th Annual TV Week Logie Awards in 1988 and is given to recognise the outstanding performance of an actress in an Australian program. The winner and nominees of this award are chosen by television industry juries. Deborah Mailman holds the record for the most wins, with four, followed by Claudia Karvan with three and Ruth Cracknell, Alison Whyte, Sigrid Thornton and Anna Torv with two wins each.

== Winners and nominees ==
Key	Meaning
‡	Indicates the winning actress

Year	Nominees	Program(s)	Network	Ref
1988	Catherine Wilkin‡	Rafferty's Rules	Seven Network	
1989	Joan Sydney‡	A Country Practice	Seven Network	
1990	Nicole Kidman‡	Bangkok Hilton	Network Ten	
1991	Rebecca Gibney‡	Come In Spinner	ABC TV	
1992	Josephine Byrnes‡	Brides of Christ	ABC TV	
1993	Ruth Cracknell‡	Mother and Son	ABC TV	
1994	Ruth Cracknell‡	Mother and Son	ABC TV	
1995	Monica Maughan‡	The Damnation of Harvey McHugh	ABC TV	
1996	Jacqueline McKenzie‡	Halifax f.p.	Nine Network	
1997	Alison Whyte‡	Frontline	ABC TV	
1998	Catherine McClements‡	Water Rats	Nine Network	
1998	Rachael Blake	Wildside	ABC TV	
1998	Rebecca Gibney	Halifax f.p.	Nine Network	
1998	Rebecca Gibney	Kangaroo Palace	Seven Network	
1998	Alison Whyte	Good Guys, Bad Guys	Nine Network	
1999	Sigrid Thornton‡	SeaChange	ABC TV	
1999	Rachael Blake	Wildside	ABC TV	
1999	Rebecca Gibney	Halifax f.p.: Afraid of the Dark	Nine Network	
1999	Rebecca Gibney	The Day of the Roses	Network Ten	
1999	Caroline Goodall	A Difficult Woman		
1999	Claudia Karvan	The Violent Earth		
2000	Sigrid Thornton‡	SeaChange	ABC TV	
2000	Kerry Armstrong	SeaChange	ABC TV	
2000	Rebecca Gibney	Halifax f.p.	Nine Network	
2000	Catherine McClements	Water Rats	Nine Network	
2001	Kerry Armstrong‡	SeaChange	ABC TV	
2001	Georgie Parker	All Saints	Seven Network	
2001	Libby Tanner	All Saints	Seven Network	
2001	Sigrid Thornton	SeaChange	ABC TV	
2002	Deborah Mailman‡	The Secret Life of Us	Network Ten	
2002	Kate Beahan	Love Is a Four Letter Word	ABC TV	
2002	Claudia Karvan	The Secret Life of Us	Network Ten	
2002	Georgie Parker	All Saints	Seven Network	
2002	Libby Tanner	All Saints	Seven Network	
2003	Claudia Karvan‡	The Secret Life of Us	Network Ten	
2003	Kerry Armstrong	MDA	ABC TV	
2003	Deborah Mailman	The Secret Life of Us	Network Ten	
2003	Freya Stafford	White Collar Blue	Network Ten	
2003	Juliet Stevenson	The Road From Coorain	ABC TV	
2004	Deborah Mailman‡	The Secret Life of Us	Network Ten	
2004	Bridie Carter	McLeod's Daughters	Nine Network	
2004	Claudia Karvan	The Secret Life Of Us	Network Ten	
2004	Kate Kendall	Stingers	Nine Network	
2004	Angie Milliken	The Shark Net	ABC TV	
2005	Miranda Otto‡	Through My Eyes: The Lindy Chamberlain Story	Seven Network	
2005	Rebecca Gibney	Small Claims	Network Ten	
2005	Claudia Karvan	Love My Way	Fox8	
2005	Asher Keddie	Love My Way	Fox8	
2005	Leeanna Walsman	Jessica	Network Ten	
2006	Claudia Karvan‡	Love My Way	Fox8	
2006	Justine Clarke	The Surgeon	Network Ten	
2006	Romola Garai	The Incredible Journey of Mary Bryant	Network Ten	
2006	Asher Keddie	Love My Way	Fox8	
2006	Lisa McCune	Hell Has Harbour Views	ABC TV	
2007	Susie Porter‡	RAN Remote Area Nurse	SBS TV	
2007	Daniella Farinacci	The Society Murders	Network Ten	
2007	Claudia Karvan	Love My Way	W. Channel	
2007	Asher Keddie	Love My Way	W. Channel	
2007	Judith McGrath	All Saints	Seven Network	
2008	Alison Whyte‡	Satisfaction	Showcase	
2008	Diana Glenn	Satisfaction	Showcase	
2008	Claudia Karvan	Love My Way	Showtime	
2008	Asher Keddie	Love My Way	Showtime	
2008	Victoria Thaine	Rain Shadow	ABC1	
2009	Kat Stewart‡	Underbelly	Nine Network	
2009	Julia Blake	Bed of Roses	ABC1	
2009	Claire van der Boom	Rush	Network Ten	
2009	Rebecca Gibney	Packed to the Rafters	Seven Network	
2009	Madeleine West	Satisfaction	Showcase	
2010	Claudia Karvan‡	Saved	SBS TV	
2010	Justine Clarke	Tangle	Showcase	
2010	Asher Keddie	Underbelly: A Tale of Two Cities	Nine Network	
2010	Susie Porter	East West 101	SBS TV	
2010	Kat Stewart	Tangle	Showcase	
2011	Claire van der Boom‡	Sisters of War	ABC1	
2011	Justine Clarke	Tangle	Showcase	
2011	Asher Keddie	Offspring	Network Ten	
2011	Catherine McClements	Rush	Network Ten	
2011	Kat Stewart	Offspring	Network Ten	
2012	Melissa George‡	The Slap	ABC1	
2012	Essie Davis	The Slap	ABC1	
2012	Diana Glenn	Killing Time	TV1	
2012	Asher Keddie	Paper Giants: The Birth of Cleo	ABC1	
2012	Kat Stewart	Offspring	Network Ten	
2013	Deborah Mailman‡	Mabo	ABC1	
2013	Catherine McClements	Tangle	Showcase	
2013	Mandy McElhinney	Howzat! Kerry Packer's War	Nine Network	
2013	Susie Porter	Dangerous Remedy	ABC1	
2013	Leah Purcell	Redfern Now	ABC1	
2014	Asher Keddie‡	Offspring	Network Ten	
2014	Danielle Cormack	Wentworth	SoHo	
2014	Claudia Karvan	The Time of Our Lives	ABC1	
2014	Mandy McElhinney	Paper Giants: Magazine Wars	ABC1	
2014	Kat Stewart	Offspring	Network Ten	
2015	Danielle Cormack‡	Wentworth	SoHo	
2015	Marta Dusseldorp	Janet King	ABC	
2015	Jessica Marais	Carlotta	ABC	
2015	Denise Roberts	Schapelle	Nine Network	
2015	Nicole da Silva	Wentworth	SoHo	
2016	Deborah Mailman‡	Redfern Now: Promise Me	ABC	
2016	Essie Davis	Miss Fisher's Murder Mysteries	ABC	
2016	Mandy McElhinney	House of Hancock	Nine Network	
2016	Pamela Rabe	Wentworth	SoHo	
2016	Sarah Snook	The Beautiful Lie	ABC	
2017	Anna Torv‡	Secret City	Showcase	
2017	Danielle Cormack	Wentworth	Showcase	
2017	Elizabeth Debicki	The Kettering Incident	Showcase	
2017	Marta Dusseldorp	Janet King	ABC	
2017	Jessica Marais	Love Child	Nine Network	
2017	Yael Stone	Deep Water	SBS	
2018	Pamela Rabe‡	Wentworth	Showcase	
2018	Elisabeth Moss	Top of the Lake: China Girl	BBC First	
2018	Kate Atkinson	Wentworth	Showcase	
2018	Kate Box	Riot	ABC	
2018	Leeanna Walsman	Safe Harbour	SBS	
2019	Jenna Coleman‡	The Cry	ABC	
2019	Danielle Cormack	Secret City: Under The Eagle	Foxtel	
2019	Judy Davis	Mystery Road	ABC	
2019	Leah Purcell	Wentworth	Foxtel	
2019	Nicole Chamoun	On The Ropes	SBS	
2022	Anna Torv‡	The Newsreader	ABC	
2022	Claudia Karvan	Bump	Stan	
2022	Deborah Mailman	Total Control	ABC	
2022	Isla Fisher	Wolf Like Me	Stan	
2022	Miranda Otto	Fires	ABC	
2023	Harriet Dyer‡	Colin from Accounts	Binge	
2023	Claudia Jessie	Bali 2002	Stan	
2023	Claudia Karvan	Bump	Stan	
2023	Kate Mulvany	The Twelve	Binge/Foxtel	
2023	Marta Dusseldorp	The Twelve	Binge/Foxtel	
2023	Milly Alcock	Upright	Binge/Foxtel	

== Multiple wins ==
Number	Actress
Wins
4	Deborah Mailman
3	Claudia Karvan
2	Ruth Cracknell
2	Alison Whyte
2	Sigrid Thornton
2	Anna Torv

== Programs with most awards ==
Wins	Program
3	SeaChange
3	The Secret Life of Us
2	Mother and Son
2	Wentworth
