= Maggie Tabberer =

Australian model and television presenter (1936–2024)

Maggie Tabberer AM
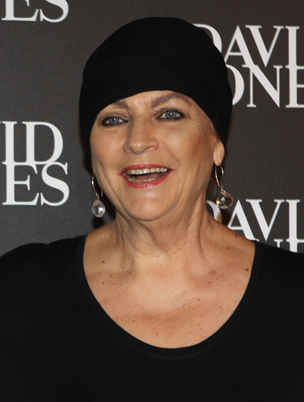
- Tabberer in 2012
- Born: Margaret May Trigar; 11 December 1936; Adelaide, South Australia, Australia
- Died: 6 December 2024 (aged 87); Sydney, New South Wales, Australia
- Occupations: Model; television presenter; publishing and media personality; public relations company founder; fashion label founder
- Years active: 1950–2024
- Spouses: Charles Tabberer (m. 1954; div. 1961); Ettore Prossimo (m. 1967; sep. 1984)
- Partner: Richard Zachariah (1985–1995)
- Awards: Gold Logie Award (1970, 1971)

Margaret May Tabberer AM (née Trigar; 11 December 1936 – 6 December 2024) was an Australian fashion, publishing and television personality. She was a dual recipient of the Gold Logie award for her television work. Tabberer founded her own fashion label and PR companies and was known for her long-time position as fashion editor of the Australian Women's Weekly magazine.

== Career ==
=== Modelling and fashion career ===
At the age of 14, while attending her sister's wedding, she was spotted by a photographer and as a result was offered her first modelling job, a one-off assignment. In her early twenties she attended a modelling school and at the age of 23 was discovered by photographer Helmut Newton who mentored her and launched her successful modelling career. While living in Melbourne in 1960, she won the Model of the Year award and then moved to Sydney to take advantage of modelling opportunities there. She chose to end her modelling career at the age of 25 after beginning to lose her slim figure.

Tabberer stayed well-connected to the fashion industry, however. In 1967 she started a public relations company, Maggie Tabberer & Associates, which took on many fashion-related clients and assignments. In 1981, she launched a plus-size clothing label called Maggie T. Tabberer was the brand's ambassador but did not have a stake in the company.

A portrait of her by Australian artist Paul Newton was a finalist in the 1999 Archibald Prize.

=== Publishing and PR work ===
Tabberer began working in publishing when she wrote a fashion column, "Maggie Says", for The Daily Mirror newspaper in Sydney in 1963. She remained with the paper for 16 years, until billionaire Kerry Packer asked her to become fashion editor of Australian Women's Weekly magazine in 1981. She soon became the public face of the magazine, frequently appearing on its cover and in television advertising. Tabberer stayed with the magazine for 15 years until 1996.

=== Television work ===
Tabberer began appearing on television in 1964, as one of the "beauties" on the panel talk show Beauty and the Beast (the "beast" being the show's host, Eric Baume, until 1965 and then Stuart Wagstaff). Her appearances on Beauty and the Beast made her a household name and she later began hosting her own daily chat show, Maggie, for which she won two consecutive Gold Logies in 1970 and 1971. She was the first person to win consecutive awards, although Graham Kennedy had already won three non-consecutive Gold Logies by 1970.

Beginning in 2005, she hosted her own television interview show, Maggie ... At Home With, on Australian pay TV channel Bio (formerly the Biography Channel). On her show she "visit[ed] the homes of various Australian celebrities and elites to discuss their lives, careers, tragedies, and triumphs".

In 2001 Bio and Foxtel published a two-disc DVD compilation of selected interviews: Maggie Beer, Natalie Bloom, David Campbell, Iva Davies, Collette Dinnigan, Dawn Fraser, George Gross and Harry Watt, Geoff Harvey, Marcia Hines, Claudia Karvan, Kylie Kwong, Jeanne Little, Ian "Molly" Meldrum, Trent Nathan, Georgie Parker, Neil Perry, Ian Thorpe, Stuart Wagstaff, and Jacki Weaver

== Personal life ==
Margaret May Tabberer was born on 11 December 1936 in Parkside, South Australia, the youngest of five children to Alfred and Molly Trigar.

Tabberer took her surname from her first husband, Charles Tabberer, whom she married at the age of 17. They had two daughters, Brooke and Amanda. The demands of her modelling career, however, saw that marriage end after seven years.

After moving to Sydney with her daughters in 1960, Tabberer was introduced by Helmut Newton to Ettore Prossimo, an Italian restaurateur, whom she married in 1967. In that same year, Tabberer gave birth to their son, Francesco, who died of sudden infant death syndrome when 10 days old. The pair separated after 17 years of marriage, although they rekindled their friendship before Prossimo's death from a heart attack in 1996.

In 1985, Tabberer announced that she was in a relationship with journalist Richard Zachariah (1945-2025). The couple co-presented a lifestyle television series, The Home Show, on the Australian Broadcasting Corporation from 1990 to 1995 when they separated.

Tabberer suffered from diabetes in her later years and died on 6 December 2024, aged 87.

== Honours and awards ==
In the Queen's Birthday Honours in 1998, Tabberer was made a Member of the Order of Australia for service to the community, particularly through her support for charitable organisations and the advancement of the Australian fashion industry.

=== Awards ===
Award	Association	Year	Work	Result
Model of the Year		1960		Won
Gold Logie	Logie Awards	1970	Maggie	Won
Gold Logie	Logie Awards	1971	Maggie	Won
