= Gold Logie Award for Most Popular Personality on Australian Television =

Annual award

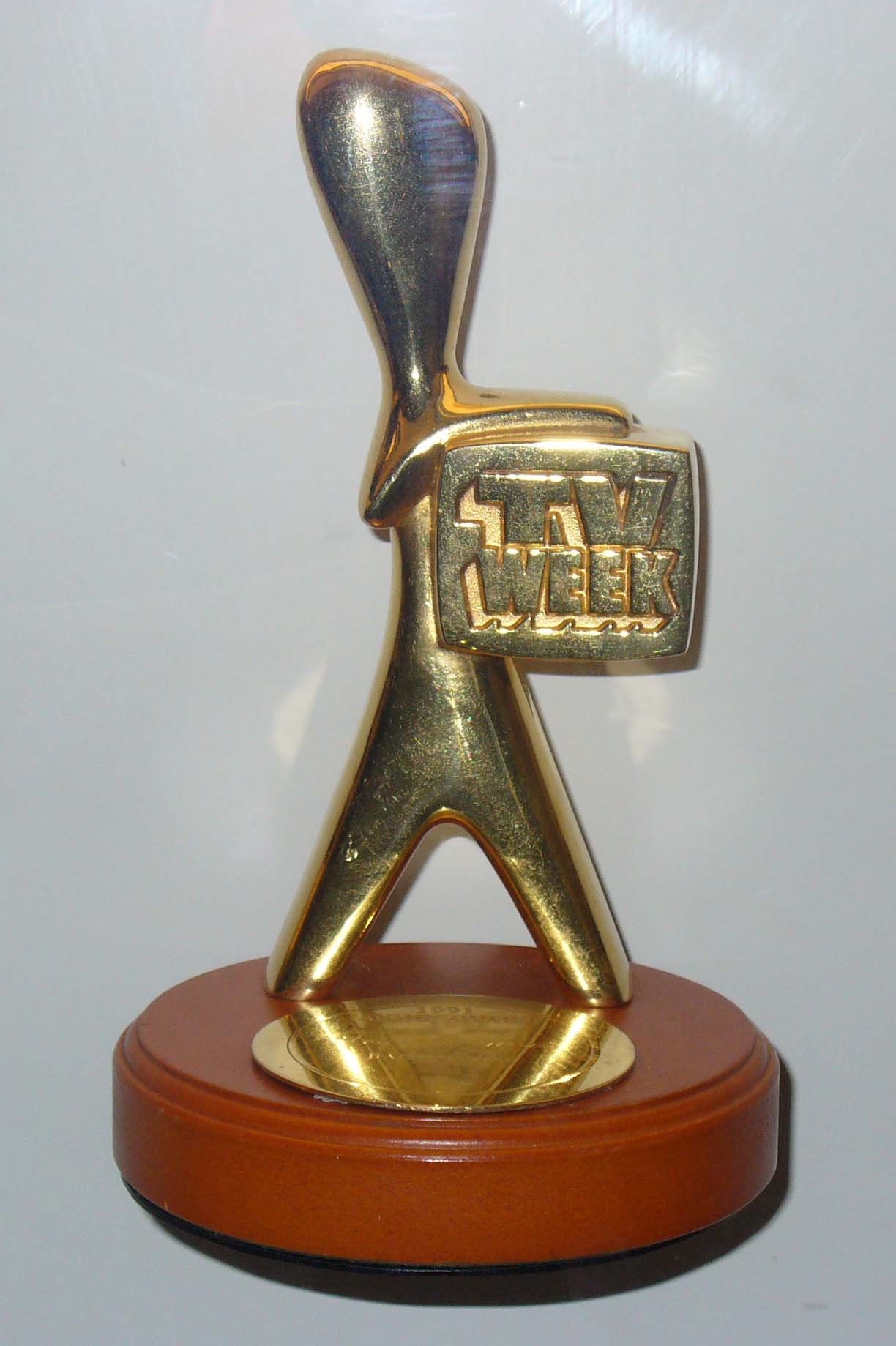
- Country: Australia
- Formerly called: Logie Award for Best Personality on Australian Television
- First award: 1960; 66 years ago
- Currently held by: Sam Pang (2026)

Highlights
- Most awards: Graham Kennedy
- Website: www.tvweeklogieawards.com.au

The Gold Logie Award for Most Popular Personality on Australian Television, commonly referred to simply as the Gold Logie, is an award presented annually at the Australian Logie Awards.

Graham Kennedy, a popular TV host, comedian and variety star is the most awarded recipient, having won seven times, but with also winning the 1959 "Star of the Year" award, which is generally thought of as the predecessor of the "Gold Logie"

The Gold Logie was first awarded at the 2nd Annual TV Week Logie Awards, held in 1960. It was briefly renamed Best Personality on Australian Television from 2016 to 2017. For the 2018 ceremony, the award category name was reverted to its current name.

The winner and nominees of the Gold Logie are chosen by the public through an online voting survey on the TV Week website. Gold Logies were awarded for separate male and female categories in 1962, 1967, 1970, 1971, and between 1974 and 1977.

The most represented programs are the drama series Blue Heelers and the variety/talk show Don Lane Show.

== Most wins ==
Name	Wins
Graham Kennedy	7×
Ray Martin	5×
Bert Newton	4×
Lisa McCune	4×
Daryl Somers	3×
Rove McManus	3×

== Winners and nominees ==
Key	Meaning
‡	Indicates the winner(s)

Year	Nominees	Program(s)	Network	Ref
1960	Graham Kennedy‡	In Melbourne Tonight	GTV9	
1961	Bob Dyer‡	Pick a Box	ATN7	
1962	Lorrae Desmond‡	The Lorrae Desmond Show	ABC TV	
1962	Tommy Hanlon Jr.‡	It Could Be You	Nine Network	
1963	Michael Charlton‡	Four Corners	ABC TV	
1964	Bobby Limb‡	The Mobil Limb Show	Nine Network	
1965	Jimmy Hannan‡	Jimmy	Network Ten	
1966	Gordon Chater‡	The Mavis Bramston Show	Seven Network	
1967	Graham Kennedy‡	In Melbourne Tonight	Nine Network	
1967	Hazel Phillips‡	The Barry Crocker Show	Network Ten	
1968	Brian Henderson‡	Bandstand	Nine Network	
1969	Graham Kennedy‡	In Melbourne Tonight	Nine Network	
1970	Barry Crocker‡	Sound of Music	Nine Network	
1970	Maggie Tabberer‡	Maggie	Seven Network	
1970	Neil Armstrong and Buzz Aldrin‡ (Note: Neil Armstrong and Buzz Aldrin received a special Gold Logie for providing TV's greatest moment in their moon telecast.)	Apollo 11 broadcast		
1971	Gerard Kennedy‡	Division 4	Nine Network	
1971	Maggie Tabberer‡	Maggie	Seven Network	
1971	Bob and Dolly Dyer‡ (Note: Bob and Dolly Dyer received a special Gold Logie in recognition of their contribution to Australian TV.)	Pick a Box	Seven Network	
1972	Gerard Kennedy‡	Division 4	Nine Network	
1973	Tony Barber‡	Great Temptation	Seven Network	
1974	Graham Kennedy‡	The Graham Kennedy Show	Nine Network	
1974	Pat McDonald‡	Number 96	0-10 Network	
1975	Ernie Sigley‡	The Ernie Sigley Show	Nine Network	
1975	Denise Drysdale‡	The Ernie Sigley Show	Nine Network	
1976	Norman Gunston‡	The Norman Gunston Show	ABC TV	
1976	Denise Drysdale‡	The Ernie Sigley Show	Nine Network	
1977	Don Lane‡	The Don Lane Show	Nine Network	
1977	Jeanne Little‡	The Mike Walsh Show	0-10 Network	
1978	Graham Kennedy‡	Blankety Blanks	0-10 Network	
1979	Bert Newton‡	The Don Lane Show	Nine Network	
1980	Mike Walsh‡	The Mike Walsh Show	Nine Network	
1981	Bert Newton‡	The Don Lane Show	Nine Network	
1982	Bert Newton‡	The Don Lane Show	Nine Network	
1983	Daryl Somers‡	Hey Hey It's Saturday	Nine Network	
1984	Bert Newton‡	The Don Lane Show	Nine Network	
1985	Rowena Wallace‡	Sons and Daughters	Seven Network	
1986	Daryl Somers‡	Hey Hey It's Saturday	Nine Network	
1987	Ray Martin‡	Midday	Nine Network	
1988	Kylie Minogue‡	Neighbours	Network Ten	
1989	Daryl Somers‡	Hey Hey It's Saturday	Nine Network	
1989	Jason Donovan	Neighbours	Network Ten	
1989	Craig McLachlan	Neighbours	Network Ten	
1989	Kylie Minogue	Neighbours	Network Ten	
1990	Craig McLachlan‡	Neighbours	Network Ten	
1990	Ray Martin	Midday	Nine Network	
1990	Daryl Somers	Hey Hey It's Saturday	Nine Network	
1990	Jana Wendt	A Current Affair	Nine Network	
1991	Steve Vizard‡	Fast Forward	Seven Network	
1992	Jana Wendt‡	A Current Affair	Nine Network	
1993	Ray Martin‡	Midday	Nine Network	
1994	Ray Martin‡	Midday	Nine Network	
1995	Ray Martin‡	A Current Affair	Nine Network	
1995	Daryl Somers	Hey Hey It's Saturday	Nine Network	
1995	Gary Sweet	Police Rescue	ABC TV	
1995	Melissa George	Home and Away	Seven Network	
1996	Ray Martin‡	A Current Affair	Nine Network	
1996	Lisa McCune	Blue Heelers	Seven Network	
1996	Melissa George	Home and Away	Seven Network	
1996	Dieter Brummer	Home and Away	Seven Network	
1996	Daryl Somers	Hey Hey It's Saturday	Nine Network	
1997	Lisa McCune‡	Blue Heelers	Seven Network	
1997	Daryl Somers	Hey Hey It's Saturday	Nine Network	
1997	Kerri-Anne Kennerley	Midday with Kerri-Anne	Nine Network	
1997	Ray Martin	A Current Affair	Nine Network	
1997	John Wood	Blue Heelers	Seven Network	
1998	Lisa McCune‡	Blue Heelers	Seven Network	
1998	Kerri-Anne Kennerley	Midday with Kerri-Anne	Nine Network	
1998	Ray Martin	A Current Affair	Nine Network	
1998	Daryl Somers	Hey Hey It's Saturday	Nine Network	
1998	John Wood	Blue Heelers	Seven Network	
1999	Lisa McCune‡	Blue Heelers	Seven Network	
1999	Belinda Emmett	Home and Away	Seven Network	
1999	Kerri-Anne Kennerley	Midday with Kerri-Anne	Nine Network	
1999	Georgie Parker	All Saints	Seven Network	
1999	John Wood	Blue Heelers	Seven Network	
2000	Lisa McCune‡	Blue Heelers	Seven Network	
2000	Don Burke	Burke's Backyard	Nine Network	
2000	Georgie Parker	All Saints	Seven Network	
2000	Sigrid Thornton	SeaChange	ABC TV	
2000	John Wood	Blue Heelers	Seven Network	
2001	Georgie Parker‡	All Saints	Seven Network	
2001	Lisa McCune	Blue Heelers and The Potato Factory	Seven Network	
2001	Ada Nicodemou	Home and Away	Seven Network	
2001	Sigrid Thornton	SeaChange	ABC TV	
2001	John Wood	Blue Heelers	Seven Network	
2002	Georgie Parker‡	All Saints	Seven Network	
2002	Rove McManus	Rove (Live)	Network Ten	
2002	Ada Nicodemou	Home and Away	Seven Network	
2002	Libby Tanner	All Saints	Seven Network	
2002	John Wood	Blue Heelers	Seven Network	
2003	Rove McManus‡	Rove (Live)	Network Ten	
2003	Lisa Chappell	McLeod's Daughters	Nine Network	
2003	Georgie Parker	All Saints	Seven Network	
2003	Libby Tanner	All Saints	Seven Network	
2003	John Wood	Blue Heelers	Seven Network	
2004	Rove McManus‡	Rove (Live)	Network Ten	
2004	Lisa Chappell	McLeod's Daughters	Nine Network	
2004	Delta Goodrem	Neighbours	Network Ten	
2004	Georgie Parker	All Saints	Seven Network	
2004	John Wood	Blue Heelers	Seven Network	
2005	Rove McManus‡	Rove (Live)	Network Ten	
2005	Bridie Carter	McLeod's Daughters	Nine Network	
2005	Bec Cartwright	Home and Away	Seven Network	
2005	Georgie Parker	All Saints	Seven Network	
2005	John Wood	Blue Heelers	Seven Network	
2006	John Wood‡	Blue Heelers	Seven Network	
2006	Natalie Bassingthwaighte	Neighbours	Network Ten	
2006	Bridie Carter	McLeod's Daughters	Nine Network	
2006	Bec Cartwright	Home and Away	Seven Network	
2006	Rove McManus	Rove Live	Network Ten	
2006	Bert Newton	Good Morning Australia	Network Ten	
2006	Ada Nicodemou	Home and Away	Seven Network	
2006	Kate Ritchie	Home and Away	Seven Network	
2007	Kate Ritchie‡	Home and Away	Seven Network	
2007	Natalie Blair	Neighbours	Network Ten	
2007	Rachael Carpani	McLeod's Daughters	Nine Network	
2007	John Howard	All Saints and The Real Seachange	Seven Network	
2007	Simmone Jade Mackinnon	McLeod's Daughters	Nine Network	
2007	Rove McManus	Rove Live	Network Ten	
2007	Bert Newton	Bert's Family Feud and 20 to 1	Nine Network	
2007	John Wood	Blue Heelers	Seven Network	
2008	Kate Ritchie‡	Home and Away	Seven Network	
2008	Natalie Blair	Neighbours	Network Ten	
2008	Andrew Denton	Enough Rope	ABC1	
2008	Adam Hills	Spicks and Specks	ABC1	
2008	John Howard	All Saints	Seven Network	
2008	Chris Lilley	Summer Heights High	ABC1	
2008	Lisa McCune	Sea Patrol	Nine Network	
2008	Rove McManus	Rove and Are You Smarter Than a 5th Grader?	Network Ten	
2009	Rebecca Gibney‡	Packed to the Rafters	Seven Network	
2009	Natalie Bassingthwaighte	So You Think You Can Dance Australia	Network Ten	
2009	Andrew Denton	Enough Rope	ABC1	
2009	Adam Hills	Spicks and Specks	ABC1	
2009	Simmone Jade Mackinnon	McLeod's Daughters	Nine Network	
2009	Rove McManus	Rove and Are You Smarter Than a 5th Grader?	Network Ten	
2009	Kate Ritchie	Home and Away	Seven Network	
2009	Ian Smith	Neighbours	Network Ten	
2010	Ray Meagher‡	Home and Away	Seven Network	
2010	Esther Anderson	Home and Away	Seven Network	
2010	Wil Anderson	The Gruen Transfer	ABC1	
2010	Rebecca Gibney	Packed to the Rafters	Seven Network	
2010	Adam Hills	Spicks and Specks	ABC1	
2010	Paul McDermott	Good News Week	Network Ten	
2010	Rove McManus	Rove and Are You Smarter Than a 5th Grader?	Network Ten	
2010	Shaun Micallef	Talkin' 'Bout Your Generation	Network Ten	
2011	Karl Stefanovic‡	Today	Nine Network	
2011	Rebecca Gibney	Packed to the Rafters	Seven Network	
2011	Adam Hills	Spicks and Specks	ABC1	
2011	Asher Keddie	Offspring	Network Ten	
2011	Jessica Marais	Packed to the Rafters	Seven Network	
2011	Chrissie Swan	The Circle	Network Ten	
2012	Hamish Blake‡	Hamish and Andy's Gap Year	Nine Network	
2012	Esther Anderson	Home and Away	Seven Network	
2012	Carrie Bickmore	The Project	Network Ten	
2012	Adam Hills	Spicks and Specks and Adam Hills in Gordon Street Tonight	ABC1	
2012	Asher Keddie	Offspring	Network Ten	
2012	Asher Keddie	Paper Giants: The Birth of Cleo	ABC1	
2012	Karl Stefanovic	Today	Nine Network	
2013	Asher Keddie‡	Offspring	Network Ten	
2013	Carrie Bickmore	The Project	Network Ten	
2013	Hamish Blake	Hamish and Andy's Euro Gap Year	Nine Network	
2013	Hamish Blake	Hamish and Andy's Caravan of Courage: Australia Vs New Zealand	Nine Network	
2013	Adam Hills	Adam Hills in Gordon Street Tonight	ABC1	
2013	Andy Lee	Hamish and Andy's Euro Gap Year	Nine Network	
2013	Andy Lee	Hamish and Andy's Caravan of Courage: Australia Vs New Zealand	Nine Network	
2013	Steve Peacocke	Home and Away	Seven Network	
2014	Scott Cam‡	The Block	Nine Network	
2014	Carrie Bickmore	The Project	Network Ten	
2014	Essie Davis	Miss Fisher's Murder Mysteries	ABC1	
2014	Asher Keddie	Offspring	Network Ten	
2014	Andy Lee	Hamish & Andy's Gap Year Asia	Nine Network	
2014	Steve Peacocke	Home and Away	Seven Network	
2015	Carrie Bickmore‡	The Project	Network Ten	
2015	Hamish Blake	Hamish & Andy's Gap Year South America	Nine Network	
2015	Scott Cam	The Block	Nine Network	
2015	Asher Keddie	Offspring	Network Ten	
2015	Asher Keddie	Party Tricks	Network Ten	
2015	Andy Lee	Hamish & Andy's Gap Year South America	Nine Network	
2015	Steve Peacocke	Home and Away	Seven Network	
2016	Waleed Aly‡	The Project	Network Ten	
2016	Carrie Bickmore	The Project	Network Ten	
2016	Essie Davis	Miss Fisher's Murder Mysteries	ABC	
2016	Grant Denyer	Family Feud	Network Ten	
2016	Grant Denyer	The Great Australian Spelling Bee	Network Ten	
2016	Lee Lin Chin	SBS World News	SBS	
2016	Lee Lin Chin	The Feed	SBS	
2016	Scott Cam	The Block	Nine Network	
2016	Scott Cam	Reno Rumble	Nine Network	
2017	Samuel Johnson‡	Molly	Seven Network	
2017	Waleed Aly	The Project	Network Ten	
2017	Rodger Corser	Doctor Doctor	Nine Network	
2017	Rodger Corser	The Doctor Blake Mysteries	ABC	
2017	Grant Denyer	All Star Family Feud	Network Ten	
2017	Grant Denyer	Family Feud	Network Ten	
2017	Grant Denyer	The Great Australian Spelling Bee	Network Ten	
2017	Peter Helliar	The Project	Network Ten	
2017	Jessica Marais	Love Child	Nine Network	
2017	Jessica Marais	The Wrong Girl	Network Ten	
2018	Grant Denyer‡	All Star Family Feud	Network Ten	
2018	Grant Denyer‡	Family Feud	Network Ten	
2018	Amanda Keller	The Living Room	Network Ten	
2018	Andrew Winter	Selling Houses Australia	Lifestyle	
2018	Andrew Winter	Love It or List It Australia	Lifestyle	
2018	Jessica Marais	Love Child	Nine Network	
2018	Jessica Marais	The Wrong Girl	Network Ten	
2018	Rodger Corser	Doctor Doctor	Nine Network	
2018	Tracy Grimshaw	A Current Affair	Nine Network	
2019	Tom Gleeson‡	Hard Quiz	ABC	
2019	Amanda Keller	The Living Room	Network Ten	
2019	Amanda Keller	Dancing with the Stars	Network Ten	
2019	Costa Georgiadis	Gardening Australia	ABC	
2019	Eve Morey	Neighbours	Network Ten	
2019	Rodger Corser	Doctor Doctor	Nine Network	
2019	Sam Mac	Sunrise	Seven Network	
2019	Waleed Aly	The Project	Network Ten	
2022	Hamish Blake‡	Lego Masters	Nine Network	
2022	Julia Morris	I'm a Celebrity...Get Me Out of Here!	Network Ten	
2022	Karl Stefanovic	Today	Nine Network	
2022	Karl Stefanovic	60 Minutes	Nine Network	
2022	Melissa Leong	MasterChef Australia	Network Ten	
2022	Melissa Leong	Celebrity MasterChef Australia	Network Ten	
2022	Ray Meagher	Home And Away	Seven Network	
2022	Sonia Kruger	Big Brother	Seven Network	
2022	Sonia Kruger	Holey Moley	Seven Network	
2022	Sonia Kruger	Dancing with the Stars: All Stars	Seven Network	
2022	Sonia Kruger	The Voice	Seven Network	
2022	Sonia Kruger	The Voice: Generations	Seven Network	
2022	Tom Gleeson	Hard Quiz	ABC	
2023	Sonia Kruger‡	Big Brother	Seven Network	
2023	Sonia Kruger‡	Dancing with the Stars	Seven Network	
2023	Sonia Kruger‡	The Voice	Seven Network	
2023	Hamish Blake	Lego Masters	Nine Network	
2023	Julia Morris	I'm a Celebrity...Get Me Out of Here!	Network Ten	
2023	Julia Morris	Taskmaster Australia	Network Ten	
2023	Leigh Sales	7.30	ABC	
2023	Mark Coles Smith	Mystery Road: Origin	ABC	
2023	Osher Günsberg	The Bachelors Australia	Network Ten	
2023	Osher Günsberg	The Masked Singer Australia	Network Ten	
2023	Shaun Micallef	Shaun Micallef's Mad as Hell	ABC	
2024	Larry Emdur‡	The Chase Australia	Seven Network	
2024	Larry Emdur‡	The Morning Show	Seven Network	
2024	Andy Lee	The Hundred with Andy Lee	Nine Network	
2024	Asher Keddie	Strife	Binge	
2024	Julia Morris	I'm a Celebrity...Get Me Out of Here!	Network Ten	
2024	Robert Irwin	I'm a Celebrity...Get Me Out of Here!	Network Ten	
2024	Sonia Kruger	Big Brother	Seven Network	
2024	Sonia Kruger	Dancing with the Stars	Seven Network	
2024	Sonia Kruger	The Voice	Seven Network	
2024	Sonia Kruger	Logies Red Carpet	Seven Network	
2024	Tony Armstrong	News Breakfast	ABC	
2024	Tony Armstrong	Great Australian Stuff	ABC	
2025
2025	Lynne McGranger‡	Home and Away	Seven Network	
2025	Ally Langdon	A Current Affair	Nine Network	
2025	Ally Langdon	The Olympic Games Paris 2024	Nine Network	
2025	Hamish Blake	Lego Masters Australia	Nine Network	
2025	Julia Morris	I'm a Celebrity...Get Me Out of Here!	Network Ten	
2025	Lisa Millar	Back Roads	ABC	
2025	Lisa Millar	ABC News Breakfast	ABC	
2025	Lisa Millar	Muster Dogs: Collies & Kelpies	ABC	
2025	Lisa Millar	Muster Dogs: Where Are They Now	ABC	
2025	Poh Ling Yeow	MasterChef Australia	Network Ten	
2025	Sonia Kruger	The Voice	Seven Network	
2025	Sonia Kruger	Dancing With The Stars	Seven Network	
2025	Sonia Kruger	Logies Red Carpet Show	Seven Network	
2026
2026	Sam Pang‡	Sam Pang Tonight	Network Ten	
2026	Sam Pang‡	Have You Been Paying Attention?	Network Ten	
2026	Sam Pang‡	The Front Bar	Seven Network	
2026	Sam Pang‡	Logie Awards 2025	Seven Network	
2026	Allison Langdon	A Current Affair	Nine Network	
2026	Allison Langdon	The Great Debate	Nine Network	
2026	Allison Langdon	Election 2025: Australia Decides	Nine Network	
2026	Allison Langdon	Winter Olympic Games 2026	Nine Network	
2026	Allison Langdon	Parental Guidance	Nine Network	
2026	Julia Morris	I'm a Celebrity...Get Me Out of Here!	Network Ten	
2026	Lisa Millar	Back Roads	ABC	
2026	Lisa Millar	Muster Dogs	ABC	
2026	Lisa Millar	Muster Dogs: Where Are They Now	ABC	
2026	Poh Ling Yeow	MasterChef Australia	Network Ten	
2026	Robert Irwin	I'm a Celebrity...Get Me Out of Here!	Network Ten	
2026	Todd Woodbridge	Tipping Point Australia	Nine Network	
2026	Todd Woodbridge	Australian Open	Nine Network	
2026	Todd Woodbridge	Winter Olympic Games 2026	Nine Network	
2026	Todd Woodbridge	Roland Garros 2025	Nine Network	
2026	Todd Woodbridge	Wimbledon 2025	Nine Network	
2026	Todd Woodbridge	US Open 2025	Nine Network	
2026	Todd Woodbridge	Cross Court	Nine Network	

== Most awarded programs ==
Wins	Program
5	The Don Lane Show
5	Blue Heelers
4	Home and Away
3	In Melbourne Tonight
3	The Ernie Sigley Show
3	Hey Hey It's Saturday
3	Midday
3	A Current Affair
3	Rove (Live)
2	Neighbours
2	Pick a Box
2	Maggie
2	Division 4
2	The Mike Walsh Show
2	All Saints
2	The Project
