= Logie Award for Most Popular Comedy Program =

Australian television award

- Country: Australia
- Presented by: TV Week
- First award: 1977
- Currently held by: Have You Been Paying Attention? (2023)
- Website: www.tvweeklogieawards.com.au

The Logie for Most Popular Comedy Program is an award presented annually at the Australian TV Week Logie Awards. It recognises the popularity of an Australian comedy program, which over the years have included scripted comedy series, sketch comedy, variety comedy shows and panel comedy shows.

It was first awarded at the 19th Annual TV Week Logie Awards, held in 1977 when the award was originally called Most Popular Australian Comedy. Over the years, it has been known as Most Popular Variety/Panel Comedy Show (1978), Most Popular Comedy Show (1979, 1981, 1983), Most Popular Variety/Comedy Show (1980), Most Popular Comedy Series (1982), Most Popular Comedy Series (1985).

The award was discontinued in 1986 when nominees were included in the Most Popular Australian Light Entertainment Program category. From 1989 to 1992, that award was known as the Most Popular Light Entertainment Program/Comedy award.

The category was reinstated as the Most Comedy Program in 1993 until 1999. In 2000, the categories were again combined as the Most Popular Comedy/Light Entertainment Program award. From 2018, the award category name was restored as Most Popular Comedy Program.

The winner and nominees of this category are chosen by the public through an online voting survey on the TV Week website. Full Frontal holds the record for the most wins, with four, followed by The Paul Hogan Show and Fast Forward with three each.

== Winners and nominees ==
Key	Meaning
‡	Indicates the winning program

Year	Program	Network	Ref
1977	The Paul Hogan Show‡	Nine Network	
1978	Blankety Blanks‡	Network Ten	
1979	The Paul Hogan Show‡	Nine Network	
1980	The Don Lane Show‡	Nine Network	
1981	The Mike Walsh Show‡	Nine Network	
1982	Kingswood Country‡	Seven Network	
1983	Kingswood Country‡	Seven Network	
1984	The Paul Hogan Show‡	Nine Network	
1985	Hey Hey It's Saturday‡	Nine Network	
1989	The Comedy Company‡	Network Ten	
1990	The Comedy Company‡	Network Ten	
1991	Fast Forward‡	Seven Network	
1992	Fast Forward‡	Seven Network	
1993	Fast Forward‡	Seven Network	
1994	The Late Show‡	ABC	
1995	Full Frontal‡	Seven Network	
1996	Full Frontal‡	Seven Network	
1997	Full Frontal‡	Seven Network	
1998	Full Frontal‡	Seven Network	
1999	Hey Hey It's Saturday‡	Nine Network	
1999	Good News Week	Network Ten	
1999	The Panel	Network Ten	
1999	Totally Full Frontal	Network Ten	

From 2000 to 2017, comedy nominees were included in the Logie Award for Most Popular Entertainment Program category.

Year	Program	Network	Ref
2018	Have You Been Paying Attention?‡	Network Ten	
2018	Here Come The Habibs	Nine Network	
2018	Hughesy, We Have a Problem	Network Ten	
2018	Shaun Micallef's Mad as Hell	ABC	
2018	True Story with Hamish & Andy	Nine Network	
2019	Have You Been Paying Attention?‡	Network Ten	
2019	Hughesy, We Have a Problem	Network Ten	
2019	Rosehaven	ABC	
2019	Russell Coight's All Aussie Adventures	Network Ten	
2019	Shaun Micallef's Mad as Hell	ABC	
2019	True Story with Hamish & Andy	Nine Network	
2022	Have You Been Paying Attention?‡	Network Ten	
2022	Aftertaste	ABC	
2022	Fisk	ABC	
2022	Shaun Micallef's Mad as Hell	ABC	
2022	The Hundred with Andy Lee	Nine Network	
2022	The Cheap Seats	Network Ten	
2023	Have You Been Paying Attention?‡	Network Ten	
2023	Fisk	ABC	
2023	Shaun Micallef's Mad as Hell	ABC	
2023	The Front Bar	Seven Network	
2023	The Hundred with Andy Lee	Nine Network	
2023	Wellmania	Netflix	

== Multiple wins ==
Number	Program
Wins
4	Full Frontal
4	Have You Been Paying Attention?
3	The Paul Hogan Show
3	Fast Forward
2	Hey Hey It's Saturday
2	Kingswood Country
2	The Comedy Company

== See also ==
- Logie Award for Most Popular Entertainment Program
