= Logie Awards of 2001 =

Australian television awards ceremony

43rd Logie Awards
- Date: 22 April 2001
- Site: Crown Palladium, Melbourne, Victoria
- Hosted by: Shaun Micallef

Highlights
- Gold Logie: Georgie Parker
- Hall of Fame: Ruth Cracknell
- Most awards: All Saints and SeaChange (3)
- Most nominations: SeaChange (8)

Television coverage
- Network: Nine Network

The 43rd Annual TV Week Logie Awards was held on Sunday 22 April 2001 at the Crown Palladium in Melbourne, and broadcast on the Nine Network. The ceremony was hosted by Shaun Micallef, and guests included Michael Crawford and Christopher Ellison.

== Winners and nominees ==
In the tables below, winners are listed first and highlighted in bold.

=== Gold Logie ===
Most Popular Personality on Australian Television
- **Georgie Parker in All Saints (Seven Network)**
  - Lisa McCune in Blue Heelers and The Potato Factory (Seven Network)
  - Ada Nicodemou in Home and Away (Seven Network)
  - Sigrid Thornton in SeaChange (ABC TV)
  - John Wood in Blue Heelers (Seven Network)

=== Acting/Presenting ===
Most Popular Actor	Most Popular Actress
**Martin Sacks in Blue Heelers (Seven Network)**; Daniel MacPherson in Neighbours (Network Ten); William McInnes in SeaChange (ABC TV); John Wood in Blue Heelers (Seven Network)	**Georgie Parker in All Saints (Seven Network)**; Bec Cartwright in Home and Away (Seven Network); Rebecca Gibney in Halifax f.p. (Nine Network); Sigrid Thornton in SeaChange (ABC TV)
Most Outstanding Actor in a Series	Most Outstanding Actress in a Series
**John Howard in SeaChange (ABC TV)**; Steve Bisley in Water Rats (Nine Network); William McInnes in SeaChange (ABC TV); Geoff Morrell in Grass Roots (ABC TV)	**Kerry Armstrong in SeaChange (ABC TV)**; Georgie Parker in All Saints (Seven Network); Libby Tanner in All Saints (Seven Network); Sigrid Thornton in SeaChange (ABC TV)
Most Popular New Male Talent	Most Popular New Female Talent
**Jamie Durie in Backyard Blitz (Nine Network)**; Beau Brady in Home and Away (Seven Network); Chris Egan in Home and Away (Seven Network); Ben Steel in Home and Away (Seven Network)	**Tammin Sursok in Home and Away (Seven Network)**; Caroline Craig in Blue Heelers (Seven Network); Madeleine West in Neighbours (Network Ten); Karina Brown in Sale of the Century (Nine Network)
Most Outstanding News Reporter
**Paul Lockyer (ABC TV)**; Paul Marshall (Seven Network); Dominique Schwartz (ABC TV); Alan Sunderland (SBS)

=== Most Popular Programs ===
Most Popular Program	Most Popular Light Entertainment Program
**All Saints (Seven Network)**; Blue Heelers (Seven Network); Home and Away (Seven Network); SeaChange (ABC TV)	**The Panel (Network Ten)**; Rove (Live) (Network Ten); Surprise, Surprise (Nine Network); Who Wants to Be a Millionaire? (Nine Network)
Most Popular Lifestyle Program	Most Popular Sports Program
**Backyard Blitz (Nine Network)**; Better Homes and Gardens (Seven Network); Changing Rooms (Nine Network); Harry's Practice (Seven Network)	**The Dream with Roy and HG (Seven Network)**; The AFL Footy Show (Nine Network); The NRL Footy Show (Nine Network); The Olympic Show (Seven Network)
Most Popular Reality Program	Most Popular Public Affairs Program
**The Mole (Seven Network)**; Animal Hospital (Nine Network); Popstars (Seven Network); RPA (Nine Network)	**A Current Affair (Nine Network)**; 60 Minutes (Nine Network); Today (Nine Network); Today Tonight (Seven Network)

=== Most Outstanding Programs ===
Most Outstanding Drama Series	Most Outstanding Mini Series or Telemovie
**SeaChange (ABC TV)**; All Saints (Seven Network); Stingers (Nine Network); Water Rats (Nine Network)	**Halifax f.p.: A Person of Interest (Nine Network)**; Dogwoman – The Legend of Dogwoman (Nine Network); Ihaka – Blunt Instrument (Network Ten); Marriage Acts (ABC TV); The Potato Factory (Seven Network); Waiting at the Royal (Nine Network)
Most Outstanding Comedy Program	Most Outstanding Children's Program
**The Games (ABC TV)**; The Dream with Roy and HG (Seven Network); The Panel (Network Ten); Pizza (SBS TV)	**Hi-5 (Nine Network) and Round the Twist (ABC TV)**; Crash Zone (Seven Network); Eugenie Sandler P.I. (ABC TV)
Most Outstanding Sports Coverage	Most Outstanding News Coverage
**The Games of the XXVII Olympiad (Seven Network)**; FAI 1000 Bathurst (Network Ten); Melbourne Cup Carnival (Network Ten); Nine's Summer of Cricket (Nine Network)	**"World Economic Forum/S11 Protests", National Nine News (Nine Network)**; "East Timor", ABC News (ABC TV); "Middle East", ABC News (ABC TV); "Shoot-out in Suva", National Nine News (Nine Network)
Most Outstanding Special Report in a Public Affairs Program	Most Outstanding Documentary
**"Fixing Cricket", Four Corners (ABC TV)**; "Balibo: The Simple Truth", Dateline (SBS); "On Life's Border: The Struggle of North Korea's Refugees", Dateline (SBS); "Sierra Leone", Foreign Correspondent (ABC TV)	**A Death in the Family (SBS)**; The Diplomat (SBS); The Last Warriors (Seven Network); The Track (ABC TV)

== Performers ==
- Ricky Martin – "She Bangs" and "Loaded"
- Human Nature – A medley
- Vanessa Amorosi – "Shine"

== Hall of Fame ==
After several years on Australian television, Ruth Cracknell became the 18th inductee into the TV Week Logies Hall of Fame.
