= Logie Awards of 1996 =

38th Logie Awards
- Date: 21 April 1996
- Site: Melbourne Park Function Centre, Melbourne, Victoria
- Hosted by: Daryl Somers

Highlights
- Gold Logie: Ray Martin
- Hall of Fame: Maurie Fields
- Most awards: Home and Away (3)

Television coverage
- Network: Nine Network

The 38th Annual TV Week Logie Awards was held on Sunday, April 21, 1996, at the Melbourne Park Function Centre in Melbourne, and broadcast on the Nine Network. The ceremony was hosted by Daryl Somers, and guests included Gloria Reuben and Holly Hunter.

== Winners and nominees ==
The nominees for the 38th Logie Awards were announced in early April 1996. Unlike previous years, there were five nominations in each category. These were then cut to three on the night of the ceremony.

The winners were announced during the awards ceremony on 21 April 1996.

Winners are listed first, highlighted in boldface.

=== Gold Logie ===
Most Popular Personality on Australian Television
- **Ray Martin for A Current Affair (Nine Network)**
  - Dieter Brummer for Home and Away (Seven Network)
  - Melissa George for Home and Away (Seven Network)
  - Lisa McCune for Blue Heelers (Nine Network)
  - Daryl Somers for Hey Hey It's Saturday (Nine Network)

=== Acting/Presenting ===
Most Popular Actor	Most Popular Actress
**Dieter Brummer for Home and Away (Seven Network)**; Guy Pearce for Snowy River: The McGregor Saga (Nine Network); Martin Sacks for Blue Heelers (Seven Network); Gary Sweet for Police Rescue (ABC); John Wood for Blue Heelers (Seven Network)	**Lisa McCune for Blue Heelers (Seven Network)**; Tempany Deckert for Home and Away (Seven Network); Isla Fisher for Home and Away (Seven Network); Melissa George for Home and Away (Seven Network); Rebecca Gibney for Halifax f.p. (Nine Network)
Most Outstanding Actor	Most Outstanding Actress
**Richard Roxburgh for Blue Murder (ABC)**	**Jacqueline McKenzie for Halifax f.p. (Nine Network)**
Most Popular New Talent	Most Popular Light Entertainment Personality
**Nic Testoni for Home and Away (Seven Network)**; Kate Fischer for (Seven Network); Katrina Hobbs for Home and Away (Seven Network); Wendy Mooney for Don't Forget Your Toothbrush (Nine Network); John Seru for Australian Gladiators (Seven Network)	**Daryl Somers for Hey Hey It's Saturday (Nine Network)**; Ernie Dingo for The Great Outdoors (Seven Network); Tim Ferguson for Don't Forget Your Toothbrush (Nine Network); Sam Newman for AFL Footy Show (Nine Network); Jo Beth Taylor for Australia's Funniest Home Video Show (Nine Network)
Most Popular Comedy Personality
**Magda Szubanski for Full Frontal (Seven Network)**; Andrew Denton for Denton (Seven Network); Tim Ferguson for Don't Forget Your Toothbrush (Nine Network); Jimeoin for Jimeoin (Seven Network); Daryl Somers for Hey Hey It's Saturday (Nine Network)

=== Most Popular Programs ===
Most Popular Series	Most Popular Drama
**Home and Away** **(Seven Network)**; Blue Heelers (Seven Network); Fire (Seven Network); G. P. (ABC); Neighbours (Network Ten)	**Police Rescue** **(ABC)**; The Man From Snowy River (Nine Network); Fire (Seven Network); Halifax f.p. (Nine Network); Law of the Land (Nine Network)
Most Popular Light Entertainment Program	Most Popular Comedy Program
**Don't Forget Your Toothbrush** **(Nine Network)**; The AFL Footy Show (Nine Network); The NRL Footy Show (Nine Network); Gladiators (Seven Network); Hey Hey it's Saturday (Nine Network)	**Full Frontal** **(Seven Network)**; Frontline (ABC); Hey Hey it's Saturday (Nine Network); Jimeoin (Seven Network); Just Kidding (Nine Network)
Most Popular Public Affairs Program	Most Popular Lifestyle/Information Program
**A Current Affair** **(Nine Network)**; The 7:30 Report (ABC); 60 Minutes (Nine Network); Today (Nine Network); Today Tonight (Seven Network)	**Better Homes And Gardens** **(Seven Network)**; Burke's Backyard (Nine Network); Getaway (Nine Network); The Great Outdoors (Seven Network); Talk to the Animals (Seven Network)
Most Popular Sports Coverage	Most Popular Children's Program
**The AFL Footy Show** **(Nine Network)**; AFL Grand Final (Seven Network); Australian Open Tennis (Seven Network); The NRL Footy Show (Nine Network); Gladiators (Seven Network)	**Agro's Cartoon Connection** **(Seven Network)**; A*mazing (Seven Network); Bananas in Pyjamas (ABC); Play School (ABC); Spellbinder (Nine Network)

=== Most Outstanding Programs ===
Most Outstanding Achievement in Drama Production
Winner:

Blue Murder (ABC TV)

Most Outstanding Achievement in Public Affairs
Winner:

"Minor Surgery, Major Risk", Four Corners (ABC TV)

Most Outstanding Documentary
Winner:

Untold Desires (SBS TV)

Most Outstanding Achievement in News
Winner:

"Muraroa Protests", National Nine News (Nine Network)

Most Outstanding Achievement in Comedy
Winners:

Frontline (ABC TV)

Most Outstanding Achievement by a Regional Network
Winners:

No Time For Frailty (Prime Television)

== Performers ==
- Kate Ceberano
- John Farnham

== Hall of Fame ==
After a lifetime in Australian television, Maurie Fields became the 13th inductee and 2nd posthumous inductee into the TV Week Logies Hall of Fame. However, Val Jellay accepted the award on his behalf.
