= Logie Awards of 1962 =

4th Logie Awards
- Date: 31 March 1962
- Site: Chevron Hotel, Melbourne
- Hosted by: Gerald Lyons
- Gold Logie: Lorrae Desmond; Tommy Hanlon Jr

Television coverage
- Network: ABV-2 (ABC)

The 4th Annual TV Week Logie Awards were presented on Saturday 31 March 1962 at the Chevron Hotel on St Kilda Road, Melbourne. The awards presentation was telecast live in a half-hour broadcast on ABV-2, (The ABC's Melbourne station), with delayed transmission on ABC stations in other cities over the following days. Gerald Lyons from the ABC was the Master of Ceremonies. Game show host Bob Dyer was on hand to present awards. Winning the Gold Logie was a joint honour that year with entertainer Tommy Hanlon Jr and variety host Lorrae Desmond, winning the coveted award, in doing so, Desmond was the first woman on Australian television to win the Gold.

== Awards ==
=== Gold Logie ===
Most Popular Personality on Australian Television
Winner:

Lorrae Desmond and Tommy Hanlon Jr

=== Logie ===
==== National ====
Best Variety Show
Winner:

Revue '61, ATN-7

Best Drama Series
Winner:

Consider Your Verdict, HSV-7

Best Youth Entertainment
Winner:

Bandstand, TCN-9

Best Female Singer
Winner:

Patsy Ann Noble

Best Male Singer
Winner:

Col Joye

Best Comedian
Winner:

Bobby Limb

Best Documentary Series
Winner:

Anzac, Nine Network

Best News Feature Program
Winner:

Four Corners, ABC

Best Commercial of the Year
Winner:

Vacuum Oil Company's Mobil commercial with Bobby Limb

==== Victoria ====
Most Popular Male
Winner:

Graham Kennedy

Most Popular Female
Winner:

Toni Lamond

Most Popular Program
Winner:

Sunnyside Up, HSV-7

==== New South Wales ====
Most Popular Male
Winner:

Digby Wolfe

Most Popular Female
Winner:

Dawn Lake

Most Popular Program
Winner:

Johnny O'Keefe Show, ATN-7

==== South Australia ====
Most Popular Male
Winner:

Kevin Crease

Most Popular Female
Winner:

Joan Disher

Most Popular Program
Winner:

On The Sunnyside, ADS-7

==== Queensland ====
Most Popular Male
Winner:

Brian Tait

Most Popular Female
Winner:

Jill McCann

Most Popular Program
Winner:

Theatre Royal, BTQ-7

==== Tasmania ====
Most Popular Personality
Winner:

Wendy Ellis

==== Western Australia ====
Most Popular Personality
Winner:

Diana Ward
