= Logie Awards of 1984 =

26th Logie Awards
- Date: 6 April 1984
- Site: Hilton Hotel, Melbourne, Victoria
- Hosted by: Bert Newton

Highlights
- Gold Logie: Bert Newton
- Hall of Fame: Hector Crawford
- Most awards: A Country Practice (4)

Television coverage
- Network: Nine Network

The 26th Annual TV Week Logie Awards was held on Friday 6 April 1984 at the Hilton Hotel in Melbourne, and broadcast on the Nine Network. The ceremony was hosted by Bert Newton. Guests included Christopher Atkins, Heather Thomas, Tony Randall, Dwight Schultz, Douglas Barr, Gerald McRaney, Rich Little, Bob Hawke, Dame Edna Everage, Pamela Stephenson and John Bertrand.

== National Awards ==
=== Gold Logie ===
Most Popular Personality on Australian Television
Winner: Bert Newton in The Don Lane Show (Nine Network)

Nominees: Tony Barber, Daryl Somers, Mike Walsh, Rowena Wallace

=== Acting/Presenting ===
Most Popular Actor
Winner: Grant Dodwell in A Country Practice (Seven Network)

Nominees: Kevin Miles in Carson's Law (Ten Network), Shane Porteous in A Country Practice

Most Popular Actress
Winner: Rowena Wallace in Sons and Daughters (Seven Network)

Nominees: Penny Cook in A Country Practice (Seven Network), Lorraine Bayly in Carson's Law

Most Popular New Talent
Winner: James Reyne in Return to Eden (Network Ten)

Nominees: Colin Friels for For the Term of His Natural Life (Nine Network), Rebecca Rigg for A Country Practice (Seven Network)

Best Lead Actor in a Mini Series
Winner: John Stanton in The Dismissal (Network Ten)

Nominees: Bill Hunter in The Dismssal (Network Ten)

Best Lead Actress in a Mini Series
Winner: Sigrid Thornton in All the Rivers Run (Seven Network)

Nominees: Rebecca Gilling in Return to Eden

Best Supporting Actor in a Mini Series
Winner: John Meillon in The Dismissal (Network Ten)

Nominees: Charles Tingwell in All the Rivers Run (Seven Network)

Best Supporting Actress in a Mini Series
Winner: Wendy Hughes in Return to Eden (Network Ten)

Nominees: Dinah Shearing in All the Rivers Run (Seven Network)

Best Lead Actor in a Series
Winner: Kevin Miles in Carson's Law (Network Ten)

Nominees: Grant Dodwell in A Country Practice (Seven Network)

Best Lead Actress in a Series
Winner: Rowena Wallace in Sons and Daughters (Seven Network)

Nominees: Penny Cook in A Country Practice (Seven Network), Maggie Kirkpatrick in Prisoner (Network Ten)

Best Supporting Actor in a Series
Winner: Noel Trevarthen in Carson's Law (Network Ten )

Nominees: Shane Withington in A Country Practice (Seven Network)

Best Supporting Actress in a Series
Winner: Lorrae Desmond in A Country Practice (Seven Network)

Nominees: Cornelia Frances in Sons and Daughters (Seven Network)

Best Juvenile Performance
Winner: Darius Perkins in All the Rivers Run (Seven Network)

TV Reporter of the Year
Winner: Richard Carleton in Nationwide (ABC)

Nominees: Jennifer Byrne in Sunday (Nine Network), Ray Martin in 60 Minutes (Nine Network)

=== Most Popular Programs ===
Most Popular Drama Series
Winner: A Country Practice (Seven Network)

Nominees: Sons and Daughters (Seven Network), Carson's Law (Ten Network)

Most Popular Comedy Show
Winner: The Paul Hogan Show (Nine Network)

Nominees: Kingswood Country (Seven Network), Australia You're Standing In It (ABC)

Most Popular Variety Show
Winner: The Mike Walsh Show (Nine Network)

Nominees: The Daryl Somers Show (Nine Network), The Don Lane Show (Nine Network)

Most Popular Children's TV Series
Winner: Simon Townsend's Wonder World (Ten Network)

Nominees: Hey Hey It's Saturday (Nine Network), Play School (ABC)

Most Popular Quiz/Game Show
Winner: Sale of the Century (Nine Network)

Nominees: Family Feud (Nine Network), The New Price is Right (Seven Network)

Most Popular Public Affairs Program
Winner: 60 Minutes (Nine Network)

Nominees: Today (Nine Network), Nationwide (ABC)

Most Popular Documentary Series
Winner: Willesee documentaries (Seven Network)

Nominees: Peach's Gold (ABC), John Laws' World (Network Ten)

=== Best Programs ===
Best Miniseries/Telemovie
Winner: The Dismissal (Network Ten)

Nominees: Return to Eden (Network Ten), All the Rivers Run (Seven Network), Scales of Justice (ABC)

Best Special Events Telecast
Winner: Australia's Entertainment Spectacular (Nine Network)

Best News Report
Winner: "Ash Wednesday coverage" (Ten Network, Nine Network and Seven Network)

Best Single Documentary
Winner: Ash Wednesday (Nine Network)

Nominees: The Burma Railway (ABC), First Contact (Seven Network)

Best Sports Coverage
Winner: Cricket (Nine Network)

Nominees: America's Cup (Nine Network), James Hardie 1000 (Seven Network)

Outstanding Contribution by a Regional Station
Winner: Australia Naturally (Television New England, Tamworth)

== State Awards ==
=== New South Wales ===
Most Popular Male
Winner: Mike Walsh

Most Popular Female
Winner: Penny Cook

Most Popular Show
Winner: A Country Practice (Seven Network)

=== Queensland ===
Most Popular Male
Winner: Glenn Taylor

Most Popular Female
Winner: Jacki MacDonald

Most Popular Show
Winner: State Affair (Seven Network)

=== South Australia ===
Most Popular Male
Winner: Rob Kelvin

Most Popular Female
Winner: Jane Reilly

Most Popular Show
Winner: State Affair (Seven Network)

=== Tasmania ===
Most Popular Male
Winner: Bert Taylor

Most Popular Female
Winner: Jenny Roberts

Most Popular Show
Winner: Taylor's Tasmania

=== Victoria ===
Most Popular Male
Winner: Daryl Somers

Most Popular Female
Winner: Paula Duncan

Most Popular Show
Winner: Carson's Law (Network Ten)

=== Western Australia ===
Most Popular Male
Winner: Russell Goodrick

Most Popular Female
Winner: Jenny Dunstan

Most Popular Show
Winner: Channel Nine News (Nine Network)

== Hall of Fame ==
After years in the Australian television industry, Hector Crawford became the first inductee into the TV Week Logies Hall of Fame.
