= Logie Awards of 1961 =

3rd Logie Awards
- Date: 18 March 1961
- Site: Chevron-Hilton Hotel, Sydney
- Hosted by: Jimmy Edwards
- Gold Logie: Bob Dyer

Television coverage
- Network: ABN-2 (ABC)

The 3rd Annual TV Week Logie Awards were presented on Saturday 18 March 1961 at Chevron-Hilton Hotel in Sydney. Jimmy Edwards from the BBC series Whack-O! was the Master of Ceremonies. The Awards presentation was televised in a half-hour live broadcast on ABN-2, Sydney, with delayed broadcast on ABC stations in other capital cities during the following week.

This was the first year that the awards were known as the Logie Awards, after having been coined by Star of the Year recipient Graham Kennedy the previous year, to honour the Scottish engineer and innovator who contributed to the development of television as a practical medium, John Logie Baird. This article lists the winners of Logie Awards (Australian television) for 1961:

== Awards ==
=== Gold Logie ===
Most Popular Personality on Australian Television
Winner:

Bob Dyer

=== Special Gold Logie ===
Best Drama
Winner:

Stormy Petrel, ABC

=== Logie ===
==== National ====
Best Actor
Winner:

Brian James, Stormy Petrel

Best Variety Show
Winner:

Revue '61, Director Peter Macfarlane, host Digby Wolfe

Best Comedians
Winner:

Bobby Limb and Buster Fiddess

Best Singer
Winner:

Elaine McKenna

Best Australian Drama
Winner:

Shadow of a Pale Horse, ATN-7

Best Sporting Coverage
Winner:

The Davis Cup, ABC

==== Victoria ====
Most Popular Male
Winner:

Graham Kennedy

Most Popular Female
Winner:

Panda Lisner

Most Popular Program
Winner:

In Melbourne Tonight, GTV-9

==== New South Wales ====
Most Popular Male
Winner:

Digby Wolfe

Most Popular Female
Winner:

Tanya Halesworth

Most Popular Program
Winner:

The Bobby Limb Show, TCN-9

==== South Australia ====
Most Popular Male
Winner:

Ian Fairweather

Most Popular Female
Winner:

Maree Tomasetti

Most Popular Program
Winner:

Adelaide Tonight, NWS-9

==== Queensland ====
Most Popular Male
Winner:

Brian Tait

Most Popular Female
Winner:

Nancy Knudsen

Most Popular Program
Winner:

The Late Show, BTQ-7
