= Logie Awards of 1965 =

Australian television awards

7th Logie Awards
- Date: 26 March 1965
- Site: Palais de Danse, St Kilda
- Hosted by: Gerald Lyons
- Gold Logie: Jimmy Hannan

Television coverage
- Network: Nine Network

The 7th Annual TV Week Logie Awards were presented on Friday 26 March 1965 at Palais de Danse, St Kilda in Melbourne and broadcast on the Nine Network. Gerald Lyons from the ABC was the Master of Ceremonies. American television actress Donna Douglas was a guest presenter. This article lists the winners of Logie Awards (Australian television) for 1965:

== Awards ==
=== Gold Logie ===
Most Popular Personality on Australian Television
Winner:

Jimmy Hannan

=== Logie ===
==== National ====
Best Female Personality
Winner:

Dawn Lake, Sound of Music

Best Teenage Performer
Winner:

Billy Thorpe

Best Live Show
Winner:

Sound of Music, Nine Network

Best Documentary Series
Winner:

Project 64, Nine Network

Best New Show
Winner:

Mavis Bramston Show, Seven Network

Best Australian Drama Series
Winner:

Homicide, Seven Network

Best Single Documentary
Winner:

New Heart For Graham

Most Outstanding National Show
Winner:

BP Super Show, Nine Network

Best Overseas Show
Winner:

The Beverly Hillbillies

Outstanding Services to News Reading
Winner:

Sir Eric Pearce

==== Victoria ====
Most Popular Male
Winner:

Graham Kennedy

Most Popular Female
Winner:

Toni Lamond

Most Popular Program
Winner:

Tonight, Nine Network

==== New South Wales ====
Most Popular Male
Winner:

Bobby Limb

Most Popular Female

Judy Stone

Most Popular Program
Winner:

Tonight, Nine Network

==== South Australia ====
Most Popular Male
Winner:

Ernie Sigley

Most Popular Female
Winner:

Glenys O'Brien

Most Popular Program
Winner:

Country and Western Hour, Nine Network

==== Queensland ====
Most Popular Male

Dick McCann

Most Popular Female
Winner:

Jackie Ellison

Most Popular Program
Winner:

Theatre Royal, Seven Network

Special Award for News Reading
Winner:

Melody Welsh

==== Tasmania ====
Most Popular Male
Winner:

Graeme Smith

Most Popular Female
Winner:

Robyn Nevin
