= Logie Awards of 1963 =

5th Logie Awards
- Date: 26 March 1963
- Site: Chevron-Hilton Hotel, Sydney
- Gold Logie: Michael Charlton

Television coverage
- Network: Australian Broadcasting Corporation

The 5th Annual TV Week Logie Awards were announced on Wednesday 26 March 1963 by TV Week. The award ceremony was to have taken place at the Chevron-Hilton Hotel in Sydney on 23 March 1963 and been broadcast on the Australian Broadcasting Corporation (ABC), with Tony Hancock and Marie McDonald as guest presenters, but Hancock cancelled his trip to Australia due to illness. The presentation ceremony was postponed until July on board cruise liner Changsha. This article lists the winners of Logie Awards (Australian television) for 1963:

== Awards ==
=== Gold Logie ===
Most Popular Personality on Australian Television
Winner: Michael Charlton

=== Logie ===
==== National ====
Best Actor
Winner: Syd Conabere, The One Day of the Year

Best Overseas Series
Winner: Ben Casey

Best Drama
Winner: The One Day of the Year, Nine Network

Best Youth Entertainment
Winner: Johnny O'Keefe

Best Male Singer
Winner: Lionel Long

Best Female Singer
Winner: Judy Stone

Best Commercial
Winner: Craven A

Outstanding Achievement
Winner: Joan Sutherland Spectacular

Outstanding Contribution to Children's Entertainment
Winner: Happy Hammond

Enterprising Programming (country stations only)
Winner: NBN3, Newcastle

==== Victoria ====
Most Popular Male
Winner: Graham Kennedy

Most Popular Female
Winner: Panda Lisner

Most Popular Program
Winner: In Melbourne Tonight, GTV

==== New South Wales ====
Most Popular Male
Winner: Chuck Faulkner

Most Popular Female
Winner: Diana Ward

Most Popular Program
Winner: Startime, ATN

==== South Australia ====
Most Popular Male
Winner: Lionel Williams

Most Popular Female
Winner: Angela Stacey

Most Popular Program
Winner: Adelaide Tonight, NWS

==== Queensland ====
Most Popular Male
Winner: George Wallace Jnr

Most Popular Female
Winner: Jackie Ellison

Most Popular Program
Winner: Theatre Royal, BTQ

==== Western Australia ====
Most Popular Personality
Winner: Gary Carvolth

==== Tasmania ====
Most Popular Personality
Winner: Wendy Ellis

=== Special Achievement Award ===
Special Achievement Award for Comedy
Winner: Dawn Lake and Bobby Limb

Special Achievement Award for Dancing
Winner: Carlu Carter and Bill McGrath

Special Achievement Award for Variety
Winner: Lorrae Desmond Show, ABC

Special Achievement Award
Winner: Tommy Hanlon, Jr., It Could Be You

Special Achievement Award
Winner: Bob Dyer, Jack Davey Special
