= Logie Awards of 1991 =

Australian television awards event

33rd Logie Awards
- Date: 15 March 1991
- Site: World Congress Centre, Melbourne, Victoria
- Hosted by: Daryl Somers

Highlights
- Gold Logie: Steve Vizard
- Hall of Fame: James Davern
- Most awards: Fast Forward (4)

Television coverage
- Network: Nine Network

The 33rd Annual TV Week Logie Awards was held on Friday 15 March 1991 at the World Congress Centre in Melbourne, and broadcast on the Nine Network. The ceremony was hosted by Daryl Somers and guests included Angie Dickinson, Michael Ontkean and Peggy Lipton.

== Nominees and winners ==
Winners are listed first and highlighted in bold.

=== National awards ===
==== Gold Logie ====
Most Popular Personality on Australian Television
- **Steve Vizard in Fast Forward (Seven Network)**
  - Ray Martin for The Midday Show (Nine Network)
  - Daryl Somers for Hey Hey It's Saturday (Nine Network)
  - Jana Wendt for A Current Affair (Nine Network)

==== Acting/Presenting ====
Most Popular Actor on Australian TV	Most Popular Actress on Australian TV
**Craig McLachlan in Home and Away (Network Ten)**; Richard Huggett in E Street (Network Ten); Tony Martin in E Street (Network Ten); Shane Porteous in A Country Practice (Seven Network)	**Georgie Parker in A Country Practice (Seven Network)**; Nicolle Dickson in Home and Away (Seven Network); Penny Cook in E Street (Network Ten); Lenore Smith in The Flying Doctors (Nine Network)
Most Outstanding Actor	Most Outstanding Actress
**Michael Craig in G.P. (ABC TV)**	**Rebecca Gibney in Come In Spinner (ABC TV)**
Most Popular Actor in a Telemovie or Miniseries	Most Popular Actress in a Telemovie or Miniseries
**David McCubbin in Jackaroo (Seven Network)**	**Annie Jones in Jackaroo (Seven Network)**
Most Popular New Talent	Most Popular Light Entertainment or Comedy Male Performer
**Richard Huggett in E Street (Network Ten)**; Rebekah Elmaloglou in Home and Away (Seven Network); Sophie Heathcote in A Country Practice (Seven Network); Sophie Lee for The Bugs Bunny Show (Nine Network)	**Steve Vizard for Fast Forward (Seven Network)**
Most Popular Light Entertainment or Comedy Female Performer
**Magda Szubanski for Fast Forward (Seven Network)**

==== Most Popular Programs/Videos ====
Most Popular Series	Most Popular Light Entertainment or Comedy Program
**Home and Away** **(Seven Network)**; A Country Practice (Seven Network); E Street (Network Ten); Neighbours (Network Ten)	**Fast Forward** **(Seven Network)**
Most Popular Public Affairs Program	Most Popular Lifestyle Information Program
**A Current Affair** **(Nine Network)**	**Burke's Backyard** **(Nine Network)**
Most Popular Telemovie or Miniseries	Most Popular Sports Coverage
**Jackaroo** **(Seven Network)**	**Cricket (Nine Network)**
Most Popular Children's Program	Most Popular Music Video
**Agro's Cartoon Connection** **(Seven Network)**	"**Chain Reaction**" **by John Farnham**

==== Most Outstanding Programs ====
Most Outstanding Single Drama or Miniseries	Most Outstanding Achievement in News
**Come In Spinner (ABC TV)**	"**John Lombard" (ABC TV)**
Most Outstanding Achievement in Public Affairs	Most Outstanding Achievement by Regional Television
"**Other People's Money**", **Four Corners (ABC TV)**	**No Fixed Address (WIN Television)**
Most Outstanding Single Documentary or Series
**The Chelmsford Scream (Nine Network)**

=== State awards ===
==== New South Wales ====
Most Popular Personality
Winner: Ray Martin (Nine Network)

Most Popular Program
Winner: Home and Away (Seven Network)

==== Queensland ====
Most Popular Personality
Winner: Rob Brough (Seven Network)

Most Popular Program
Winner: Family Feud (Seven Network)

==== South Australia ====
Most Popular Personality
Winner: Anne Wills (Network Ten)

Most Popular Program
Winner: Wheel of Fortune (Seven Network)

==== Tasmania ====
Most Popular Personality
Winner: Robyn Martin (TVT6)

Most Popular Program
Winner: Tasmania Today (TVT6)

==== Victoria ====
Most Popular Personality
Winner: Daryl Somers (Nine Network)

Most Popular Program
Winner: Neighbours (Network Ten)

==== Western Australia ====
Most Popular Personality
Winner: Rick Ardon (Seven Network)

Most Popular Program
Winner: Seven News (Seven Network)

== Performers ==
- Debra Byrne and the Super Band
- Mark Williams
- Electric Legs

== Hall of Fame ==
After a lifetime in the Australian television industry, James Davern became the eighth inductee into the TV Week Logies Hall of Fame.
