= Logie Awards of 1968 =

10th Logie Awards
- Date: 22 March 1968
- Site: Southern Cross Hotel, Melbourne, Victoria
- Hosted by: Bert Newton
- Gold Logie: Brian Henderson

Television coverage
- Network: Nine Network

The 10th Annual TV Week Logie Awards were presented on Friday 22 March 1968 at the Southern Cross Hotel in Melbourne and broadcast on the Nine Network. Bert Newton from the Nine Network was the Master of Ceremonies. British television actress Violet Carson and American television actors Christopher George, Peter Breck and Cheryl Miller appeared as guests. This article lists the winners of Logie Awards (Australian television) for 1968:

== Awards ==
=== Gold Logie ===
Most Popular Personality on Australian Television
Winner:

Brian Henderson

=== Logie ===
==== National ====
Best Teenage Personality
Winner:

Little Pattie

TV Quizmaster of the Decade
Winner:

Bob Dyer

TV Sportscaster of the Year
Winner:

Ron Casey

Best Drama Series
Winner:

Homicide, Seven Network

Best Overseas Show
Winner:

Till Death Us Do Part

Best New Show of 1967
Winner:

This Day Tonight, ABC

Best Australian Comedy
Winner:

My Name's McGooley, Seven Network

Best Australian Show
Winner:

Sound of Music, Nine Network

Best Commercial
Winner:

Alka-Seltzer

Outstanding Australian TV Contribution
Winner:

"Days of Destiny" from Project 67, Nine Network

==== Victoria ====
Best Male Personality
Winner:

Graham Kennedy

Best Female Personality
Winner:

Rosie Sturgess

Best Show
Winner:

In Melbourne Tonight, Nine Network

==== New South Wales ====
Best Male Personality
Winner:

Don Lane

Best Female Personality
Winner:

Dita Cobb

Best Show
Winner:

Tonight with Don Lane, Nine Network

==== South Australia ====
Best Male Personality
Winner:

Ernie Sigley

Best Female Personality
Winner:

Anne Wills

Best Show
Winner:

Adelaide Tonight, Nine Network

==== Queensland ====
Best Male Personality
Winner:

Rod Cadee

Best Female Personality
Winner:

Jill McCann

Best Show
Winner:

I've Got a Secret, Nine Network

==== Tasmania ====
Best Male Personality
Winner:

Lindsay Edwards

Best Female Personality
Winner:

Caroline Schmit

Best Show
Winner:

Line-Up, ABC
