= Logie Awards of 1966 =

8th Logie Awards
- Date: 21 March 1966
- Site: Southern Cross Hotel, Melbourne, Victoria
- Hosted by: Bert Newton
- Gold Logie: Gordon Chater

Television coverage
- Network: Nine Network

The 8th Annual TV Week Logie Awards were presented on Monday 21 March 1966 at Southern Cross Hotel in Melbourne and broadcast on the Nine Network. British television actors Jimmy Edwards, Doris Speed, Arthur Leslie and Pat Phoenix appeared as guests. This article lists the winners of Logie Awards (Australian television) for 1966:

== Awards ==
=== Gold Logie ===
Most Popular Personality on Australian Television
Winner:

Gordon Chater

=== Logie ===
==== National ====
Best Female Personality
Winner:

Carol Raye, The Mavis Bramston Show

Best Teenage Personality
Winner:

Normie Rowe

Best Live Show
Winner:

The Mavis Bramston Show, Seven Network

Best Documentary
Winner:

Birth

Best Overseas Show
Winner:

The Dick Van Dyke Show

Best Drama
Winner:

Homicide, Seven Network

Best Commercial
Winner:

Coca-Cola

Outstanding Contribution to Development of Talent
Winner:

Showcase 65, Network Ten

Outstanding Contribution to Children's Television
Winner:

The Magic Circle Club, ATV

==== Victoria ====
Most Popular Male
Winner:

Graham Kennedy

Most Popular Female
Winner:

Mary Hardy

Most Popular Live Show
Winner:

In Melbourne Tonight, Nine Network

==== New South Wales ====
Most Popular Male
Winner:

Don Lane

Most Popular Female
Winner:

Diana Ward

Most Popular Live Show
Winner:

Tonight with Don Lane, Nine Network

==== South Australia ====
Most Popular Male
Winner:

Ernie Sigley

Most Popular Female
Winner:

Pam Western

Most Popular Program
Winner:

Adelaide Tonight, Nine Network

==== Queensland ====
Most Popular Male
Winner:

Gerry Gibson

Most Popular Female
Winner:

Jill McCann

Most Popular Live Show
Winner:

Theatre Royal, Seven Network

==== Tasmania ====
Most Popular Male
Winner:

John Crook

Most Popular Female
Winner:

Caroline Schmit

Most Popular Live Show
Winner:

Anything Goes, Nine Network

=== Special Achievement Award ===
Winner:

Dolly Dyer, Pick-A-Box – For her cheerful devotion to Bob and their show.
