= Logie Awards of 1967 =

9th Logie Awards
- Date: 10 April 1967
- Site: Zodiac Room on Fairstar in Melbourne
- Hosted by: Bert Newton
- Gold Logie: Graham Kennedy

Television coverage
- Network: Nine Network

The 9th Annual TV Week Logie Awards were presented on Monday 10 April 1967 at the Zodiac Room aboard the cruise liner Fairstar in Melbourne. Bert Newton of the Nine Network was the Master of Ceremonies. American television actor Vic Morrow was a guest presenter. This article lists the winners of the 1967 Logie Awards for Australian television:

== Awards ==
=== Gold Logie ===
Most Popular Male Personality on Australian Television
Winner: Graham Kennedy

Most Popular Female Personality on Australian Television
Winner: Hazel Phillips

=== Special Gold Logie ===
Star of the Decade
Winner: Graham Kennedy

=== Logie ===
==== National ====
Best Teenage Personality
Winner: Johnny Young

Best Live Show
Winner: Sound of Music, Nine Network

Best Overseas Show
Winner: The Man from U.N.C.L.E.

Best Commercial
Winner: Minties

Best Documentary Series
Winner: Project '66, Nine Network

Best Drama
Winner: Homicide, Seven Network

Best Comedy
Winner: My Name's McGooley, What's Yours?, Seven Network

==== Victoria ====
Most Popular Male
Winner: Graham Kennedy

Most Popular Female
Winner: Patti Newton

Most Popular Live Show
Winner: In Melbourne Tonight, Nine Network

==== New South Wales ====
Most Popular Male
Winner: Don Lane

Most Popular Female
Winner: Hazel Phillips

Most Popular Live Show
Winner: The Don Lane Tonight Show, Nine Network

==== South Australia ====
Most Popular Male
Winner: Ernie Sigley

Most Popular Female
Winner: Pam Western

Most Popular Live Show
Winner: Adelaide Tonight, Nine Network

==== Queensland ====
Most Popular Male
Winner: Don Seccombe

Most Popular Female
Winner: Jill McCann

Most Popular Live Show
Winner: Theatre Royal, Seven Network

==== Tasmania ====
Most Popular Male
Winner: John Forster

Most Popular Female
Winner: Robyn Nevin; Caroline Schmit

Most Popular Live Show
Winner: Line Up, ABC

=== Special Achievement Award ===
Winner:

Tommy Hanlon, Jr. - For pioneering of television on a nationwide basis.
The Seekers - For the promotion of Australian TV talent overseas.
