= Logie Awards of 1959 =

First annual Australian television awards

1st Logie Awards
- Gold Logie: Graham Kennedy

Television coverage
- Network: IMT (GTV-9)

The 1st Annual TV Week Logie Awards (as they would come to be known) were the first awards ever to be awarded for work within the Australian television industry. Television had begun production in Australia only three years earlier, in 1956.

== Synopsis ==
Although other cities had television (Sydney since its inception in 1956), the awards were for television programs shown in Melbourne only.

In 1959 the awards were given out during an episode of In Melbourne Tonight on 15 January, with international star Googie Withers appearing as a guest host. Awards were given in only eight categories, two of which were for American programmes.

== Awards ==
=== TV Star of the Year ===
The most prestigious award was the TV Star of the Year Award, which the following year in 1960 would become renamed as the Gold Logie. The star of the year was awarded to Graham Kennedy and Panda Lisner for their program In Melbourne Tonight, for the Nine Network (GTV-9).

=== National ===
TV Show of the Year
Winner:
In Melbourne Tonight, GTV-9

Most Popular Children's Show
Winner:
The Happy Show, GTV-9

Most Popular Overseas Variety Show
Winner:
The Perry Como Show. Como was presented with his award by George McCadden, the chief of TV Week's American office, in New York City on 11 April 1959.

Most Popular Overseas Drama
Winner:
Perry Mason

Outstanding Sports Presentation
Winner:
ABC Melbourne's Sporting Department for their coverage of events such as the Davis Cup, Test Cricket and the Australian Tennis Open

Outstanding Performance
Winner:
Bill Collins, Sunnyside Up, HSV-7
