= Geoff and Judy =

- Genre: Variety
- Presented by: Geoff Corke; Judy Jack
- Country of origin: Australia
- Original language: English

Original release
- Network: GTV-9
- Release: 1959

Geoff and Judy was a short-lived television variety series which aired in 1959 on Melbourne television station GTV-9. Hosted by Geoff Corke and Judy Jack, the series aired at 1:00PM on Tuesdays. The obscure series is largely notable for pairing two then-popular figures in Melbourne television. At the time, Australian series tended to be aired on a single station only, something that would change in the 1960s.

Geoff Corke's work on other 1950s Melbourne television series included In Melbourne Today (a daytime version of In Melbourne Tonight), variety series Anything Goes, game show Penalty Box (1957) and The Happy Go Lucky Show.

Judy Jack presented one of the earliest Australian children's series, The Judy Jack Show (1956–1957) for HSV-7 and was one of several presenters on Children's TV Club for ABV-2.

There is very little information available on Geoff and Judy, and as it was a daytime series, it is unlikely (though not impossible) that any kinescope recordings exists of it.
