= Sydney–Melbourne co-axial cable =

Telecommunications project in Australia

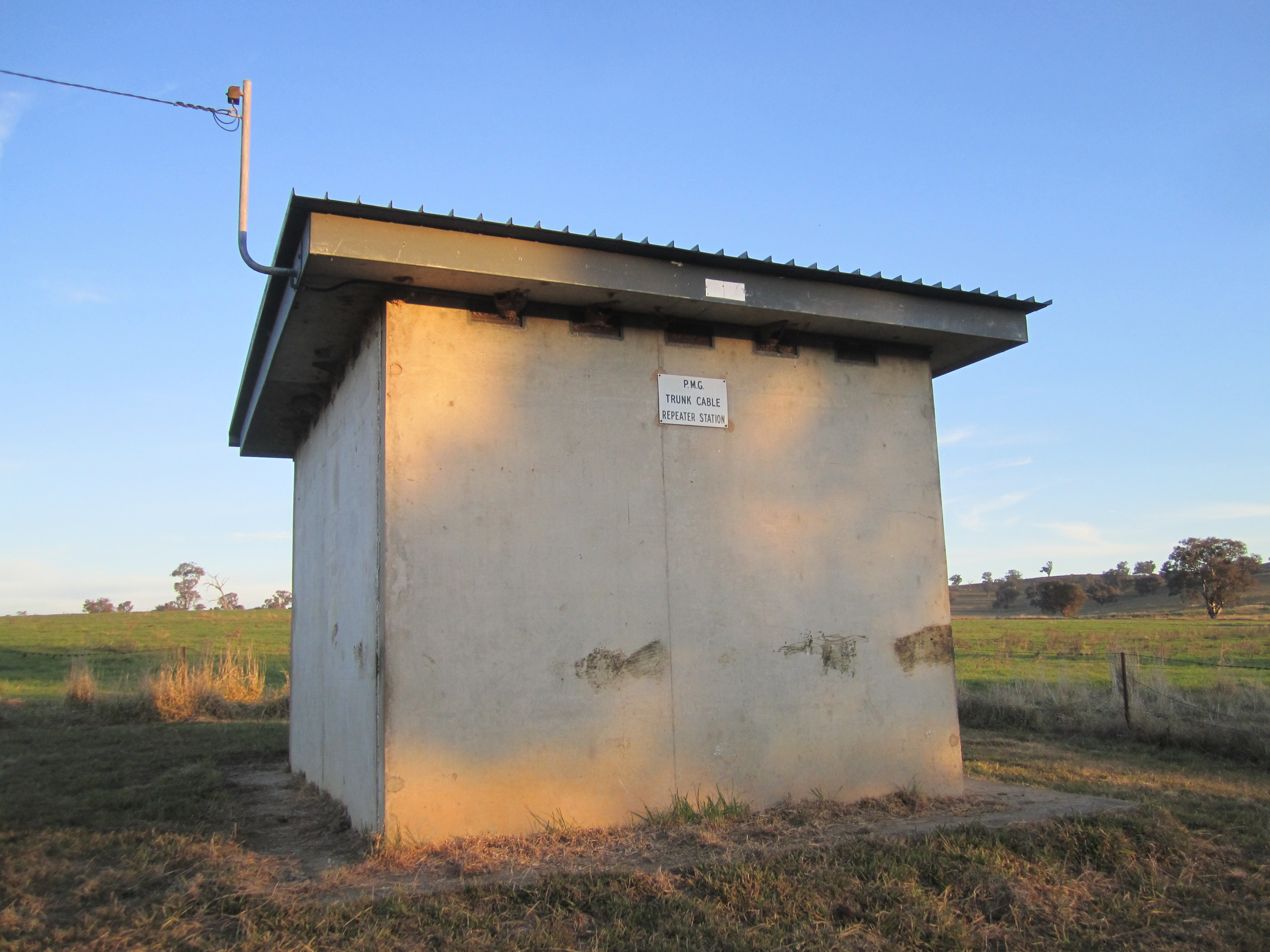
Repeater station for the cable, south of Jugiong, 2012

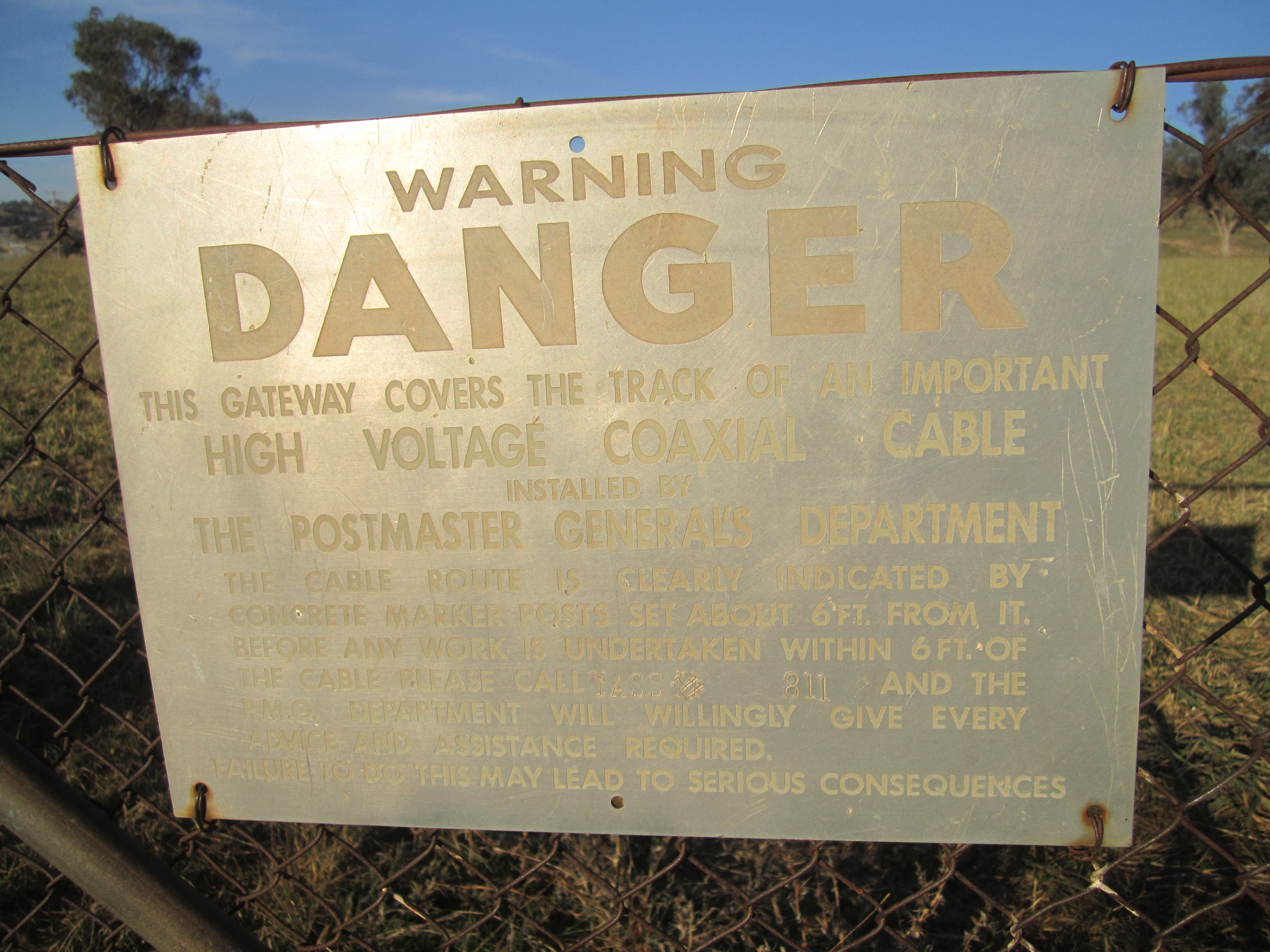
Warning sign located above the path of the coaxial cable, north of Coolac, 2012

The Sydney–Melbourne co-axial cable was a major telecommunications engineering and construction project in south-eastern Australia in the early 1960s, designed to significantly increase telecommunications transmission capacity between Sydney and Melbourne, and other centres along its route, including Canberra.

The route length of the cable was approximately 960 kilometres (600 mi) and roughly followed the Hume Highway as it existed at that time. Key points along the route were Sydney, Liverpool, Campbelltown, Bowral, Goulburn, Canberra, Yass, Gundagai, Wagga Wagga, Culcairn, Albury, Wangaratta, Benalla, Euroa, Seymour and Melbourne.

It was five years in the making and cost £6.89 million to complete. Its prime purpose was to boost the capacity for telecommunications between the two major cities. The cable was made up of three pairs of tubes, each pair capable of carrying 1,260 simultaneous telephone connections. There was a marker stone commemorating the official opening of the cable at 532 Hume Highway, Casula, which has since been removed. There is a corresponding commemorative stone in Gordon Reserve near Parliament House, Melbourne.

== Origins ==
The volume of telephone traffic in Australia increased significantly after World War II. As a result, by the 1950s the trunk network was becoming congested. The Postmaster-General's Department (PMG) was also pursuing a policy of automating the telephone and telegraph systems, including the introduction of subscriber-to-subscriber (rather than operator-assisted) long-distance calls ("subscriber trunk dialling"). So it was decided in 1957 that a new high-capacity communications link would be installed between Sydney and Melbourne (via Canberra).

A number of systems were considered, including radio transmission. Eventually the decision was taken to install a six-tube coaxial cable. As well as providing more capacity than was necessary at the time, it also allowed for the transmission of television signals. The associated carrier equipment (e.g. the active electronics) was to have sufficient capacity for the first five years, with facilities for readily increasing the number of channels to meet demand for the next 20 years.

== Construction ==
Tenders to supply the cable and other equipment were called and the main supplier, Felten and Guilleaume (West Germany), was selected in early 1959. The details of the contracts were finalised by mid-1959. The cable for the Canberra-Melbourne link was manufactured by a subcontractor, Olympic Cables, in Australia. The remaining cable and carrier equipment was manufactured in West Germany. Construction work was undertaken by staff of the PMG.

The initial shipment of cable arrived from Germany at the end of 1959. Cable laying was completed in October 1961 and jointing and testing completed in December 1961.

In total, over 960 kilometres of cable were laid, and over a million tons of rock and soil excavated to lay the cable. Main repeater stations, attended by staff, were constructed every 64 kilometres and minor, unmanned repeater stations every nine kilometres (103 in total. The main repeater stations also provided break out points to connect with minor trunk routes to regional towns (e.g. Goulburn, Yass, Gundagai). Many of the repeater stations remain today along the route, along with cable markers and other reminders of the project.

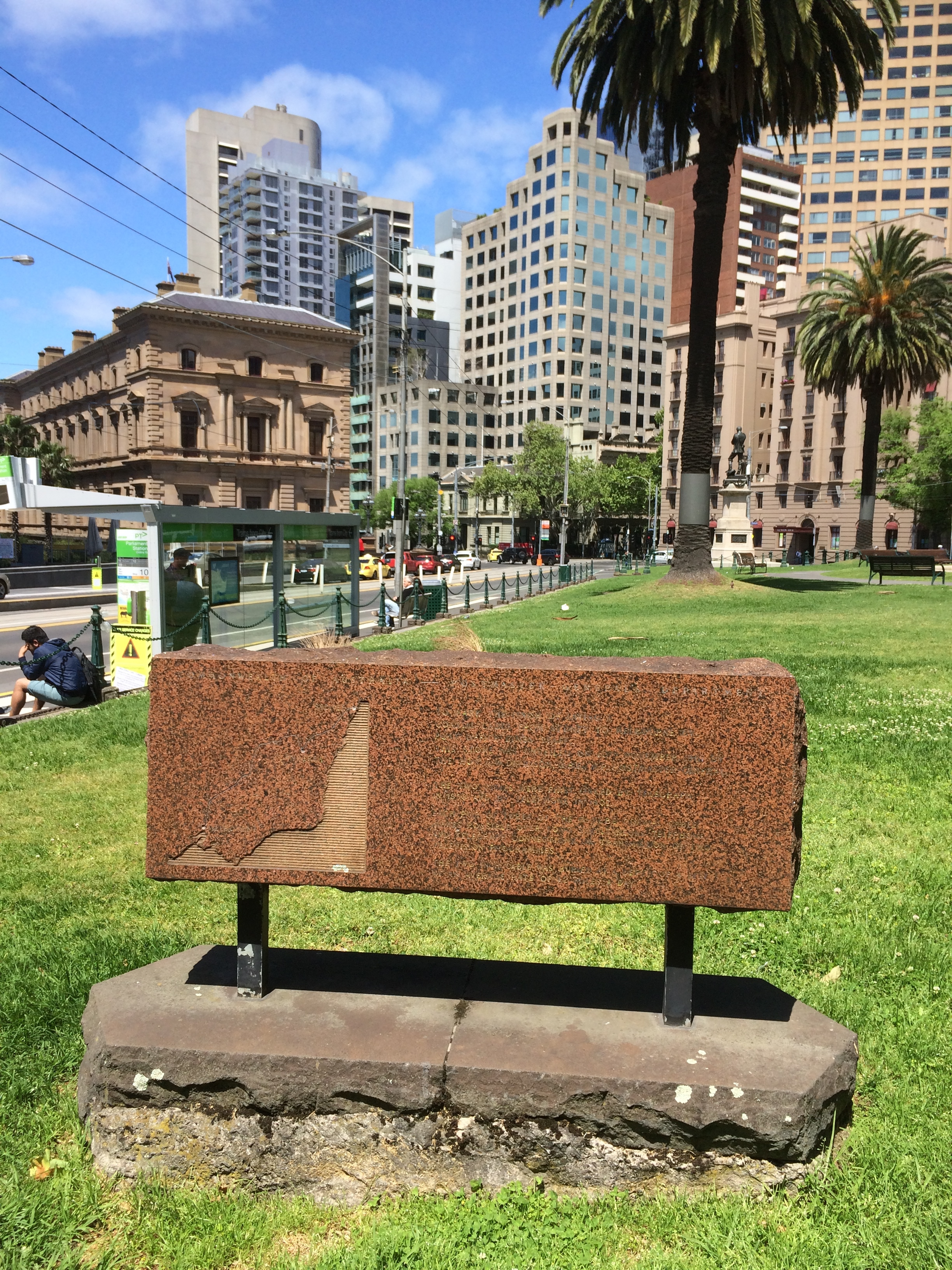
Memorial in Gordon Reserve near Parliament House, Melbourne, 2014

== Opening and impact ==
The Sydney–Melbourne coaxial cable was officially opened on 9 April 1962 when Prime Minister Robert Menzies, made an interstate direct dial call.

The coaxial cable infrastructure supported the introduction of subscriber trunk dialling (STD) between the cities and live television link-ups. After its commissioning in April 1962, the cable carried telegraph and telephone traffic. It also allowed simultaneous television broadcasting in Melbourne and Sydney for the first time.

The cable was decommissioned many years ago, superseded by more modern optical-fibre cables, operated by firms such as Telstra, Optus and NextGen.

A large number of concrete repeater stations remain along the cable's route as a reminder of the project, for example at Sutton Forrest, Wollogorang, Collector and Wallaroo. Some repeater stations are still in use as optical-fibre repeaters for the Telstra network.

In April 2012, the Minister for Communications, Stephen Conroy, issued a media release commemorating the 50th anniversary of the cable, and drawing a parallel between its forward-looking nature and his proposed National Broadband Network.

== Television ==
TCN9 and GTV9 were connected via the coaxial cable in 1963, allowing the instant sharing of news stories and programs between both cities. The cable supported the simultaneous live broadcast of the 5th Test of the 1962–63 Ashes series from the Sydney Cricket Ground to Sydney, Canberra and Melbourne – a major milestone in Australian television history.

The cable was also used in 1965 for innovative interstate live split-screen link-ups between Graham Kennedy's In Melbourne Tonight and Don Lane's Sydney Tonight.
