= Gee, But You're Swell =

Song by Chick Webb and His Orchestra, with vocal Louis Jordan
- Published: 1936
- Label: Remick Music Corp
- Lyricist(s): Abel Baer, Charles Tobias

Gee! But You're Swell was written by Abel Baer and Charles Tobias in 1936, and published by Remick Music Corp. in the same year.

== Recordings ==
One of the first recordings was in 1937, by Chick Webb and his Orchestra with vocal by Louis Jordan. A (very) brief MP3 excerpt can be heard here.

Popular recordings in 1937 were by Benny Goodman and His Orchestra (vocal by Helen Ward) and by Russ Morgan.

== Popular culture ==
"Gee, But You're Swell" was adopted by Australian television performer Graham Kennedy as his theme song for In Melbourne Tonight.

The song is used as background music throughout the 1937 Warner Bros. cartoon Porky and Gabby, and the 1938 cartoon Daffy Duck in Hollywood. A dance band plays it during the Plaza Hotel scene in the 1958 coming-of-age drama Marjorie Morningstar.
