= Tarax Show =

- Genre: Children's
- Created by: Denzil Howson
- Presented by: Happy Hammond; Geoff Corke; Norman Swain
- Starring: Ron Blaskett; Joff Ellen
- Country of origin: Australia
- Original language: English

Original release
- Network: GTV-9
- Release: 21 January 1957 – 1969

The Tarax Show is an early Australian children's TV program on GTV-9 in Melbourne running from 1957 to 1969.

== Synopsis ==
Denzil Howson who was then assistant program manager at GTV9, was asked by Norman Spencer to develop a daily children's program. A pilot of the show was kinescope recorded onto film. The program started on Melbourne's GTV-9 on 21 January 1957 (only two days after the official opening of GTV9), debuting from the Myer Emporium Lonsdale St store window, as the GTV9 studios in Bendigo Street, Richmond were still under construction. Normally the program was produced from GTV-9, but some editions were taped at ATN-7 in Sydney to help build the audience there.

Beginning under the name The Happy Show, the first host was Happy Hammond, who had come to television from radio. The program was sponsored by Tarax Drinks from April 1957, with the name changing to The Tarax Happy Show. The show was co-hosted by Princess Panda (Panda Lisner}. After Happy Hammond and Princess Panda departed to HSV-7, the program was simply The Tarax Show, hosted by Geoff Corke ("King Corky, King of the Kids") and later by Norman Swain (known as "Uncle Norman" on the Tarax Show) ... he too had come from radio (known as "Billy Bouncer" on 3KZ's Children's Hour show each morning before school).

Melbourne ventriloquist, Ron Blaskett and his mischievous doll, Gerry Gee, named for GTV-9, were featured for several years. Gerry was very popular, spawning a variety of merchandise, including a range of "Gerry Gee Junior" dolls. Blaskett's ventriloquist act was the first variety act to appear on the channel. He also starred in spin-off programs The Adventures of Gerry Gee and Do You Trust Your Wife. In 2009, a retrospective DVD was released You, Me and Gerry Gee, following on from the book of the same name.

The most popular segment in the early years of the show was "Girl Next Door", where Gerry would talk over the fence to a girl from his class, originally Elaine McKenna, later Patti McGrath (Patti Newton). Other segments included "Banjo Club", "Pura Prize Time", "Speaking of Animals", "TV Stars of Tomorrow", "TV Gym", "Stan Stafford's Bunkhouse", "Friends in Blue", "How It Works", "Dog Shop" and "Tiny's Story".

Musical accompaniments were provided by Margot Sheridan (piano) and Laurie Wilson (organ).

== Cast ==
Over time, the show's cast included Susan-Gaye Anderson, Bernard The Magician (Alf Gertler), Joffa Boy (Joff Ellen), Professor Nitwitty (Denzil Howson), Professor Ratbaggy (Ernie Carroll), Gael Dixon, Prince Philip (Philip Brady), Daisy the Cow and Freddo Frog.

Ossie Ostrich (Ernie Carroll) went on to star in Hey Hey It's Saturday, appearing with Daryl Somers for 24 years on TV. Ernie Carroll also drew the cartoon character Joy-belle and worked as producer.

Uncle Norman joined the show after a long radio career at 3KZ. His very first appearance on the TV show involved arriving down a slide, but he broke his leg in the process; Joffa improvised a little ditty about Uncle Norman breaking his leg, but when it became clear that it was not a joke, he was rushed to hospital. It was two months before he was well enough to appear again.

The TV Dentist (Renn Newberry) caused some consternation with management, by suggesting that it did not matter which brand of toothpaste was used, and saying soft drink will rot your teeth - the program was sponsored by a soft drink company, and included ads for toothpaste.

Freddo Frog appeared both as a cartoon and a costume character at different times. The animated version was one of the first Australian produced cartoon series on TV.

Young performers who later went on to become stars include Denise Drysdale, Roma Egan, Wendy Stapleton and Marty Rhone.

Due to budget cuts, the show was replaced by Uncle Norman and Joffa Boy hosting cartoons with the occasional brief comedy sketch. After the duo left GTV-9, that format was used for the successor program Cartoon Corner.

== Bibliography ==
- Blaskett, Ron (2001). You, me and Gerry Gee: 60 years of Australian showbiz. Doncaster East, Vic.: G Gee and Partners. ISBN 0-646-41790-8. OCLC 222987842.
