= Elaine McKenna =

- Born: Elaine McKenna; 24 March 1937; Melbourne, Victoria, Australia
- Died: 6 January 1992 (aged 54) Melbourne, Victoria, Australia
- Occupations: Singer, actress
- Instrument: Vocals
- Label: W&G

Elaine McKenna Evans (née Elaine McKenna, 24 March 1937 – 6 January 1992), was an Australian singer and actress. She is known for her television appearances from the late 1950s to the 1960s, particularly on GTV-9's Tarax Show and In Melbourne Tonight. For her TV work, McKenna won the Logie Award for Best Singer in 1961. McKenna relocated to the United States in late 1961. She appeared on The Bob Newhart Show in that year. By February 1968 she had returned to Melbourne.

== Biography ==
Elaine McKenna was born on 24 March 1937 and grew up in the Melbourne suburb of Albert Park with her father George McKenna and her mother. As an amateur singer and musical theatre actress she had a role in Cid Ellwood's production of The Red Sombrero, which began at Moonee Ponds Town Hall on 29 June 1956 for a week, followed by Box Hill Town Hall (30 July–1 August) and Brunswick Town Hall (30–31 October). Ellwood wrote the music and lyrics, while Tina Bethell and Ian Westcott wrote the book. In the following year McKenna took the role of Eliza in a professional-amateur rendition of Pygmalion at Cathedral Hall, Fitzroy.

By May 1960 she was referred to as a "popular TV personality" after appearing regularly on GTV-9's The Panda Show (1958) and then, as the "Girl Next Door" on Tarax Show (c. 1960). She was also a regular singer on In Melbourne Tonight, compèred by Graham Kennedy. McKenna won the Logie Award for Best Singer in March 1961 for her work on In Melbourne Tonight and The Graham Kennedy Show (title of national version).

By October 1961 she had relocated to Los Angeles, after recording her rendition of "Tammy" with Ron Tudor of W&G Records. McKenna would intermittently return to Melbourne for local TV spots before returning to America. She sang on The Bob Newhart Show in 1961 and hoped to become a regular by taking accent lessons to provide an "acceptable international accent." By December 1962 she was living in Atlanta, Georgia.

McKenna found work on the nightclub circuit across the US, into Canada and Mexico. She was singing in nightclubs in Reno, Nevada, during July 1963. On one of her visits to Australia she performed, "Just You Wait" (from My Fair Lady), on In Melbourne Tonight in December 1966. The singer returned to live in Melbourne by February 1968.

Elaine McKenna Evans died in 1992. Some of her performances from In Melbourne Tonight were included in the Various Artists' 3× DVD compilation video album, In Melbourne Tonight & the Tonight Show (2014).

***INCORRECT In the 1980s McKenna resumed her drama and musical theatre roles,***INCORRECT

***INCORRECT these entries between the asterisks are about a different Australian public figure.

Elaine Margaret McKenna born East Bentleigh, Melbourne, September 1953, and died Melbourne, May 2026. A graduate of Melbourne University, https://archives.library.unimelb.edu.au/nodes/view/600344

Australian performer, singer, actor, playwright and author—Reedy River (September–November 1980) at the Organ Factory, Clifton Hill, Come to Australia, They Said (May 1982) at La Mama Theatre, Carlton, Hotel Bonegilla (November–December 1983) at Universal Two Theatre, Fitzroy, Isadora, also written by Elaine Margaret McKenna (September–October 1984) at Universal Two, The Barricade (June 1985) and An Un-Australian Story (July) both at La Mama Theatre, Melbourne. On screen she performed in crowd scenes on the movie Pharlap and the successful Australian television series Prisoner.

Her other works include publications Better than Dancing, the wandering years of a young Australian, Mary Brennan, Greenhouse Publications, 1987; and Letting Fly, Deborah Wardley, Australia’s trail-blazing pilot; Allen and Unwin, 1992; the story of Deborah Wardley/Lawrie v Ansett Airlines under the then newly introduced Equal Opportunity Act in Victoria; and Dame Judy, Baby! a biography of the successful Australian actress of stage, film, and television. Dame Judith Anderson. Dame Judy, Baby! is ready for publication, May 2026.

Elaine Margaret McKenna was also an activist supporting the Freedom Fighters while working within Timor L’este and also while back in Australia. Elaine Margaret McKenna died in May 2026 in Melbourne*****

== Personal life ==
In October 1963 McKenna married American actor, folk singer and performer Timothy Evans. Evans had gained an engineering degree at University of Texas, however he took up folk singing as a member of the Wanderers Three. Although the couple initially planned to get married at St Patrick's Cathedral, Melbourne in December, they married in Texas instead, due to their touring schedules coinciding. By 1968 the couple were living in Melbourne, where Tim became a cabaret entertainer. Tim Evans became a TV comedy writer by 1980. He was also a long-term judge on TV talent quest, New Faces. Elaine McKenna Evans died on 6 January 1992 and was survived by her spouse, Tim and their three children.
