= Merry-Go-Round (TV series) =

- Genre: Variety
- Presented by: Panda Lisner; Michael Williamson
- Country of origin: Australia
- Original language: English

Production
- Running time: 60 minutes

Original release
- Network: HSV-7
- Release: 1961

Merry-Go-Round was an Australian television series which aired on Melbourne station HSV-7 during 1961. A variety series, it also featured a "barrel quiz" and an amateur talent segment.

Hosted by Panda Lisner and Michael Williamson, it was produced at the newly opened Channel 7 Teletheatre in Fitzroy, Victoria, probably before a live audience. The series aired in a 60-minute time-slot at 9:30PM on Mondays, and faced tough competition from the popular In Melbourne Tonight on GTV-9.
