= Tarax =

Australian brand of soft drink

- Type: Independent company
- Manufacturer: Cadbury Schweppes
- Country of origin: Australia

Tarax is an Australian brand of soft drink, available in several flavours, and sold in cans and bottles.

The name Tarax, itself was the brand-name of an independent soft drink manufacturer and bottler, from the state of Victoria.

== History ==
George Pethard Snr. (1855–1929), an English-born storeman based in Numurkah, Victoria, established a business selling a herbal soft drink described as a "non-alcoholic beer" made without yeast, known as "Taraxale". "Tarax" derived from "taraxacum", the Latin name for the dandelion.

George Pethhard Jnr. (1885–1961) joined his father's business in 1898 and moved to Bendigo in 1902, establishing the business behind "Taraxville", his home in the suburb of Golden Square. The business was expanded between the Wars, with Tarax Bars being established throughout Victoria. After World War II, the company restricted itself to selling conventional carbonated soft drink.

== Awards ==
In the 1950s Tarax won an Australian Institute of Food Science and Technology Award for its co-production of a flame spin sterilizer.

== Popular culture ==
Tarax was a marketing innovator, including sponsorship of the long-running Tarax Happy Show on television from 1957, compered by Happy Hammond and later, "Uncle" Norman Swain, and the development of new packaging, such as the steel can. Their mascot Tommy Tarax was a character who appeared on bottle tops and advertising displays, and on TV as a puppet with ventriloquist Ron Blaskett.

== Flavours ==
Producing a wide range of flavours including lemonade, orange, lime ("Limelite"), kola, lemon, pineapple, raspberry ("Crimson"), root beer, bitter lemon, "Solo", and "Panda", and the American "Dixi-Cola", Tarax was at its peak in the 1960s and was one of the top-selling soft drink brands in Victoria.

A Tarax jingle that was part of an advertising campaign associating the brand with Australian Rules Football was :

All the Top Men
Drink the Popular Ten,
Tarax Top Ten flavours.
Be a Top Man,
Drink a bottle or can.
Tarax Top Ten!

Also

Oranges turn into Tarax,
Lovely lovely Tarax.
Oranges turn into Tarax,
The drink from the top of the tree.

They did can UDL pre-mix alcoholic drinks at the Huntingdale site for many years and had an unsuccessful attempt to produce a flavoured UHT milk drink in a can.

== Acquisitions ==
Cadbury Schweppes took over Tarax in 1972, but continued to market Tarax soft drinks as a regional brand to complement its national brands.

In the 1970s the brand re-invented itself, with the dropping of several flavours and the introduction of "Black Label" in lemonade and orange. An extensive advertising campaign that featured actress Abigail. Later Pamela Gibbons, also of Number 96, performed in the Black Label commercials.

While Tarax's popularity has waned since the 1970s, it has still remained on the market, albeit with far lower prominence, relegated primarily to supermarket shelves.
