= Concentration (Australian game show) =

Australian game show TV series

- Genre: Game show
- Based on: Concentration
- Presented by: Philip Brady (1959-1967); Lionel Williams (1970); Mike Hammond (1997)
- Country of origin: Australia
- Original language: English
- No. of seasons: 11

Production
- Running time: 30 minutes
- Production companies: All American Fremantle International (1997); Becker Entertainment (1997)

Original release
- Network: Nine Network (1959-1967); Seven Network (1970, 1997)
- Release: 1959 – 1997

Concentration is a game show series that aired on Australian television networks. The game show based on the children's memory game of the same name. Matching cards represented prizes that contestants could win. As matching pairs of cards were gradually removed from the board, it would slowly reveal elements of a rebus puzzle that contestants had to solve to win a match. It aired on the Nine Network in 1959 until 1967 later aired on the Seven Network in 1970 until revived in 1997. It was hosted by Philip Brady, then in the 1970s with Lionel Williams, and then again in 1997 with Mike Hammond.
