= Geoff Corke =

Australian radio and television presenter (1934–1993)

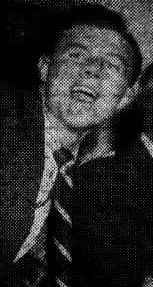
- Born: Cuthbert Geoffrey Corke; 30 December 1934; Kew, Victoria, Australia
- Died: 1 May 1993 (aged 58); Melbourne, Victoria, Australia
- Other names: Corkie; King Corkie, King of the Kids
- Occupations: radio and television presenter
- Years active: 1950 to 1970
- Employer(s): 3DB, GTV-9
- Known for: appearing on GTV-9 in Melbourne during the 1950's and 1960's
- Television: In Melbourne Tonight, The Tarax Show, Geoff and Judy, Football for the Ladies
- Height: 193 cm (6 ft 4 in)

Cuthbert Geoffrey Corke (30 December 1934 - 1 May 1993) was an Australian radio and television presenter.

He became one of the first people to appear on television in Melbourne when he introduced GTV-9's test transmissions in 1956.

== Early life ==
Corke was born at St George's Hospital in the Melbourne suburb of Kew on 30 December 1934. At the age of three months, he relocated with his parents to Papua New Guinea where his father managed a rubber plantation near Port Moresby. He and his parents returned to Melbourne when they were evacuated back to Australia from Papua New Guinea after the Japanese attacked Pearl Harbor in 1941. After returning to Melbourne, Corke began attending South Auburn Primary School and then Scotch College.

== Career ==
Corke developed a strong interest in the media in his youth. Despite initially pursuing engineering work with International Harvester Company, he had a strong desire was to work in radio. This led to him applying for a job as an office boy at Melbourne radio station 3DB. After working as an office boy, Corke became a turntable operator before hosting his own show. In 1954, he was appointed as an assistant to 3DB production manager Norm Spencer.

Corke was one of many radio personalities to be approached to work for Melbourne's new television station, GTV-9. When GTV-9 commenced test transmissions on 27 September 1956, Corke became the first person to appear on the station. During the test broadcast, Corke broadcast live from a temporary studio at the transmitter site on Mount Dandenong where he introduced selected programs including a John Wayne film and a Terrytoons cartoon.

In November 1956, Corke was involved in GTV-9's coverage of the 1956 Summer Olympics which were being held in Melbourne.

Corke was selected as one of the on air comperes on the night GTV-9 was officially opened on 19 January 1957. After Victorian governor Sir Dallas Brooks had officially opened the station, Corke and Terry Dear compered the evening's variety entertainment.

From the program's inception in 1957 until 1959, Corke was a regular on GTV-9's variety show In Melbourne Tonight, where he appeared as an offsider to host Graham Kennedy.

During this time, his profile was such that Corke and his fiancé (performer Val Ruff) were the first people to appear on the cover of TV Radio-Week when it was published for the first time in December 1957.

Corke left In Melbourne Tonight in 1959 upon the arrival of Bert Newton who formed a successful on air partnership with Kennedy.

Following his departure from IMT, Corke replaced Happy Hammond on the children's program The Tarax Show where he became known as "King Corkie, King of the Kids".

In 1959, Corke co-hosted the weekly daytime variety show Geoff and Judy. The following year, he hosted Football for the Ladies, a program GTV-9 produced for female fans of Australian rules football.

Other programs Corke was involved with at GTV-9 included Anything Goes, Penalty Box, and Happy Go Lucky.

== Personal life and death ==
Corke was known for his tall stature, and with his height reported to be 6ft 4in (193 cm) he was often described as a "gentle giant". His voice has also been described as "deep" and "mellifluous".

In December 1961, Corke was involved in an attempted rescue of a 65-year-old woman who was trapped in a burning unit in the suburb of Toorak. Corke, who was passing by at the time, worked with firefighters as they tried to rescue the woman. They attempted to climb through a window but were all forced back by the heat. After a firefighter finally managed to gain entry to the building, they passed the woman down to Corke. Despite their efforts, the woman was pronounced dead on arrival at hospital.

Corke retired from television in the late 1960's after he reportedly developed a rare abdominal disease.

He died on 1 May 1993 at the age of 58 from a degenerative disease.

In 1979, Corke remarried to a woman called Sue. They were still married at the time of his death in 1993.

He had previously married performer Val Ruff in 1958. They were married for approximately five years, during which time they had a daughter. When Ruff was asked during an interview on 3AW in March 1993 whether there had been pressure being part of a "showbiz marriage", she said she hadn't considered it as "pressure" and that "it was just a lot of fun".

Corke was an uncle to 3AW presenter Simon Owens.

== Legacy ==
Corke was portrayed by actor Donal Forde in The King - a 2007 biographical movie about Graham Kennedy.
