= Ron Blaskett =

Australian ventriloquist and comedian

- Blasket with "Willie" (left) and "Adolphus", 1950
- Born: Ronald William Blaskett; 13 April 1922; Melbourne, Victoria, Australia
- Died: 14 April 2018 (aged 96); Melbourne, Victoria, Australia
- Occupations: Ventriloquist; television personality; vaudevillian; comedian; host
- Years active: 1946–1997
- Known for: The Tarax Show, In Melbourne Tonight
- Spouse: Merle June Capper (m. 1944)

Ronald William Blaskett (13 April 1922 – 14 April 2018) was an Australian ventriloquist, television personality, vaudevillian, comedian, and host. He is best known as the ventriloquist on GTV-9 with the doll, Gerry Gee both for children's entertainment, Tarax Show (1957–1964) and on adult variety programme, In Melbourne Tonight (1957–1966).

== Biography ==
Ronald William Blaskett was born on 13 April 1922 in the Melbourne suburb of Brunswick. His parents, William Edward and Ethel Maria (née Moore) Blaskett, raised him in Northcote. His father was a major in The Salvation Army. At the age of 13, the shy boy was teased and decided to develop a "self-confident, cheeky and a laugh-getter" persona. His paternal grandmother Elizabeth gifted him a papier-mâché Cheeky Boy ventriloquist's doll. Blaskett was performing as a ventriloquist by 1938 and was broadcast on radio station, 3UZ in April 1941. He was also an apprentice process engraver in 1941, when he enlisted in the Australian Army during World War 2.

Blaskett married Merle (or Merlye) June Capper (1925–2018) on 29 November 1944. Having performed for allied troops in Balikpapan, Borneo (July–October 1945), he was discharged on 1 April 1946 as a Sergeant in the Australian Entertainment Unit. After the war, Blaskett worked in vaudeville on the Tivoli circuit. In June 1946 he performed in Jim Davidson's Clambake at Melbourne's Tivoli Theatre. In January 1950 two of his dolls, "Willie Ross" and "Adolphus Twerk", were stolen from his parked car, while he was inside Scott's Hotel, Melbourne. The thief later dumped both dolls, which were returned via the police (see photo above).

Blaskett, with three of his dolls, appeared on GTV-9's test transmission on 11 October 1956. For the test the ventriloquist had bought his new doll, "Gerry Gee", from Chicago-based puppeteer, Frank Marshall, which cost £A200. They were regulars on GTV-9's children's entertainment programme, Happy Show (later renamed Tarax Show) from its first broadcast on 21 January 1957. They were the first variety act to appear on Melbourne TV. The ventriloquist approached Melbourne doll manufacturer Lionel J Stern in 1958 to make replicas of his doll as "Gerry Gee Junior" for public sale. Stern later made various related dolls, "Geraldine Gee", "Football Supporter" and "Beatles Gerry". The doll's popularity resulted in Gerry Gee starring in Tarax Show short live-action segments, "The Adventures of Gerry Gee" (1960–1962). A nine-year-old boy, John Field, wore a Gerry Gee mask to portray the doll for distant shots. Blaskett's wife also worked with him as a ventriloquist operating her doll, "Sandra Simpkins".

Blaskett, with three dolls ("Gerry", "Adolphus", "Aunt Agatha"), also compèred an adult-orientated quiz show Do You Trust Your Wife? (1957–1958). The pair's stint on Tarax Show ended in 1964. The ventriloquist and doll periodically appeared on GTV-9's adult variety programme, In Melbourne Tonight from 1957. Former Tarax Show programme manager, Denzil Howson organised Blaskett to relocate to Perth in June 1966 and join Howson at local television station, STW9 (allied to Melbourne's GTV-9). While there, he produced a variety show, The Channel Niners Club and appeared on it as a ventriloquist with Gerry Gee. He also produced The Jeff Newman Show for STW9 across four months during 1967. In April and May 1968 Blaskett and Gerry were members of the first Perth-based entertainment troupe to perform for Australian and allied forces in the Vietnam War. During the 1970s they returned to Melbourne and guested on another GTV-9's Nine Network show, The Ernie Sigley Show (1974–1976) and on Network 10's Young Talent Time and All Star Sweepstakes (1977–1978).

Blaskett officially retired in 1997. In 2001 he published an autobiography, You, Me and Gerry Gee: 60 Years of Australian Showbiz. He sold Gerry Gee for A$17,000 in 2006. Ronald William Blaskett died on 14 April 2018, the day after his 96th birthday. His wife, Merle (or Merlye) June Blaskett (née Capper) died in the following month, on 26 May, aged 92 or 93. They were survived by their two children and families.

== Bibliography ==
- Blaskett, Ron (2001), You, Me and Gerry Gee: 60 Years of Australian Showbiz, Newton, Bert (Forward) (1st ed.), [G Gee and Partners], ISBN 978-0-646-41790-5
