= Anything Goes (Australian TV series) =

- Genre: Variety
- Presented by: Geoff Corke; Beverley Stewart
- Country of origin: Australia
- Original language: English

Original release
- Network: GTV-9
- Release: 23 January – 20 February 1957

Anything Goes is an early Australian television variety series which aired on Melbourne station GTV-9. Broadcast on Wednesdays at 8:00 PM, it aired from 23 January to 20 February 1957.

It was hosted by Geoff Corke and Beverley Stewart, with episodes including audience participation, interviews and music with a guest vocalist.

Competition in the time-slot consisted of U.S. imports Ford Theatre (re-titled Kraft TV Theatre) and Douglas Fairbanks, Jr., Presents (re-titled Chesebrough-Ponds Playhouse) on HSV-7, while ABV-2 offered U.S. imports I Spy and Startime

The hour-long series was replaced by two local productions, game show The Dulux Show at 8:00 PM, with discussion series Leave It to the Girls at 8:30 PM (for two weeks this slot was held by U.S. anthology series episodes).
