= Panda Lisner =

Australian model, presenter and TV pioneer

- Born: Joan Dorothy Kelly; 29 August 1930; Claremont, Western Australia
- Died: 2011 (aged 80-81)
- Occupation: TV presenter
- Known for: In Melbourne Tonight
- Awards: Logie Award (1959)

Panda Lisner (born Joan Dorothy Kelly; 29 August 1930 – 2011) was an Australian model and television presenter, most notable for her work during the early days of Australian television.

Lisner is arguably best known for her time as a "barrel girl" on the prize wheel audience-participation segment of the live variety show, In Melbourne Tonight. On 31 August 1966 she joined only a handful of women who filled in as replacement comperes for Graham Kennedy in the first 10 years of that program.

== Personal life ==
She was born in Claremont, Western Australia. Her first marriage to actor Francois Lisner, which produced a son, ended in divorce in 1959. In 1961, Panda Lisner married American entertainer and band leader Jimmy Allan, and they eventually relocated to the United States of America in the late 1960s to work in Las Vegas after obtaining residency permits.

She published her memoirs Surviving Fame: Memoirs of a TV Princess in 2001 through Spectrum books.

== Career ==
After arriving in Melbourne, Lisner worked as a fashion model. She was noticed during in-store parades and chosen in 1957 to represent the Darrods department store in live promotional spots on GTV-9. A year later she signed a contract with Channel 9 that reputedly made her the highest-paid woman on Australian TV.

Apart from In Melbourne Tonight, Lisner also appeared on Astor Showcase, The Bob Dyer Show, The Panda Show, Merry Go Round and The Happy Show and other specials. When working in children’s television she was sometimes styled as “Princess Panda“ and wore a Tiara.

== Logie awards ==
During her television career, she won a number of Logie Awards including the TV Star of the Year Award (which was renamed the Gold Logie) at the first Australian television awards ceremony in 1959. Lisner was also awarded Logies for being Best Female Personality (Nine Network) in 1960, Most Popular Female (Victoria) in 1961 and Most Popular Female (Victoria) in 1963.

== Popular culture ==
Australian actress Kate Doherty portrayed Lisner in the 2007 biographical film about Graham Kennedy, The King.

Lisner moved back to Australia with her husband in 1989 to live in quiet retirement before she died in 2011.

Explaining her decision to drop out and disillusion with contemporary television in 2001, she told journalist Bob Hart, who had rediscovered her:

TV used to look for the best in everything, and everybody. Now it just looks for the cheapest programming. It’s sad. The magic disappeared.

== Other references ==
- "1969 Final Tarax Show". australianfoodtimeline.com.au. Australian food history timeline. 21 September 1960. Archived from the original on 18 April 2018. (via archive.org)
- "Death of a TV giant". The Age. The Age. 26 May 2005.
- "Inscription on a TV Week Award, 1959". nfsa.gov.au. National Film and Sound Archive. February 2019.
