= Nicky Whitta =

Australian radio personality

- Born: Clifford Nicholls Whitta; 24 September 1903; Melbourne, Victoria
- Died: 8 September 1956 (aged 52); Darebin, Victoria, Australia
- Resting place: Springvale Crematorium
- Education: Princes Hill State School
- Occupation: Radio personality
- Years active: 1931−1956
- Spouse: Nancy Lee (m. 1935)
- Children: 2

Clifford Nicholls "Nicky" Whitta (24 September 1903 – 8 September 1956) was a popular Australian radio personality. He originally broadcast as Nicky Nicholls.

He is also credited with being a mentor to Graham Kennedy during his early career.

The popularity of Whitta at the time of his death was such that it prompted a large spontaneous tribute by his fans, when thousands of Melburnians unexpectedly lined the city streets after his funeral to watch the procession travel the 12-mile journey from the church to the crematorium.

== Early life ==
Born in 1903, Whitta was the second son to his parents, John and Lydia Whitta. After attending Princes Hill State School, Whitta commenced an apprenticeship as a jeweller. After also trying his hand at poultry farming, Whitta decided to become a radio announcer.

== Radio career ==
After learning to play the guitar at Allans Music, Whitta secured his first radio job, working with the Australian Broadcasting Company as an instrumentalist in the band at 3AR.

From 1931, Whitta began working on a children's program at 3LO, before joining 3AW in 1932.

While Whitta was at 3AW, he began collaborating with Fred Tupper on the station's breakfast program.

In 1933, former child star Kathleen Lindgren joined 3AW, taking on the stage name Nancy Lee. Whitta and Lee began working together, developing the station's children's program Chatterbox Corner, which became known for its theme song "Being a Chum is Fun".

After commencing a romantic relationship, Whitta and Lee were married at the Methodist Church in Richmond on 31 August 1935.

In 1944, Lee withdrew from public life to focus on being a stay-at-home parent.

Whitta left 3AW in 1946. After briefly relocating to Sydney to work at 2CH, Whitta returned to Melbourne in 1948 and accepted a job as a breakfast presenter at 3KZ, where he developed a regular talent segment called Junior Stars of the Air.

In 1950, he transferred to 3UZ in what would ultimately be his last radio job.

After commencing work at 3UZ, Whitta briefly teamed up again with his wife Nancy Lee to present the Saturday night program, Party Nite.

However, it was his late-morning/early afternoon program at 3UZ that he would become best known for. At the height of its popularity, Whitta's 3UZ program would attract 73% of the listening audience.

His regular program on 3UZ featured regular segments such as Cookery Nook, Know Your Melbourne and Housewive's Quiz.

== Work with Graham Kennedy ==
When Whitta arrived at 3UZ, Graham Kennedy was working in the record library at the station. Kennedy already had some limited off-air radio experience after working as a copy boy at 3LO and as a turntable operator at 3AW.

Upon his arrival at the station, Whitta was accompanied by Alf "Alfie Boy" Thesinger who was already working as Whitta's panel operator and on-air partner.

Thesinger's radio career came to a halt unexpectedly when he was conscripted following the introduction of National Service, providing Kennedy with the opportunity of being Whitta's new on-air partner.

Whitta and Kennedy would form one of radio's most popular partnerships.

Kennedy attributed their chemistry to sharing a similar sense of humour and their mutual dislike of orthodox radio presentation methods.

Although Whitta was known to keep a book full of jokes, gags and humorous anecdotes, Kennedy claimed he stopped using it after the first few months of the announcers working together, resulting in the humour becoming more improvised.

Whitta and Kennedy were famous for parodying the advertisements that they were expected to read during their program, which Kennedy insisted they did to "liven up" the ads. But while most sponsors would be willing to go along with their businesses and products being subject to the pair's humour, Kennedy claimed the Commonwealth Bank had complained about their style, and the two announcers were ordered to deliver their commercials in a normal manner.

Another issue Whitta and Kennedy made fun of regarding the advertisements was when they ran behind the set schedule. Kennedy said that on one occasion, to make a joke out of it, he and Whitta read two live advertisements simultaneously, while talking over several pre-recorded commercials.

On another occasion, Whitta and Kennedy played a joke on their listeners by bringing in a portable radio into the studio, tuning it to 3XY and playing it through the microphones, essentially broadcasting the rival station over the 3UZ airwaves, confusing listeners.

According to Kennedy, Whitta would even leave the studio windows open to allow for more comedy to be found from everyday situations such as when a dog would be heard barking, which Whitta named "Corsets" (because it would be tied up during the day, but let loose at night).

== Television ambitions ==
When television arrived in Melbourne, Whitta signed a contract with GTV-9 and was destined to become part of the cluster of radio announcers making the move over to the new medium. Whitta was expected to host a live and interactive daily children's program called Children's Theatre.

Whitta died before he could begin the program.

Following his death, Kennedy would use the many comedic skills Whitta had taught him when he began hosting the popular In Melbourne Tonight program in 1957.

== Death ==
Whitta died at his home in Darebin from a coronary occlusion. It was reported that he had just driven his wife and two sons back from Warburton before complaining of feeling ill. He died shortly after his wife phoned for a doctor.

Following Whitta's death, 3UZ hosted a scheduled live all-day broadcast from Melbourne's Anzac House, encouraging people to donate to the RSL's "Operation Gratitude" appeal. The appeal had been officially launched by Sir Dallas Brooks the previous July in a bid to raise money to build homes for returned military personnel.

During the 3UZ appeal, more than £30,000 (equivalent to A$1,064,529 in 2022) of the £204,000 (equivalent to A$7,238,797 in 2022) raised was donated "in memory of Nicky".

Sir Dallas Brooks also paid tribute to Whitta during the appeal, stating that he and his wife were "shocked" by the news of his death, and said that Whitta's voice, character and personality were known and loved.

Whitta's funeral attracted one of the largest gatherings Melbourne had seen with up to 150,000 people watching the funeral procession, as they lined the streets as the procession made its way from the Methodist Church in Ivanhoe to the Springvale Crematorium.

Following his death, Harry "Happy" Hammond replaced Whitta at 3UZ.

== Portrayal ==
In The King, the television movie about Graham Kennedy's life, Whitta was portrayed by Garry McDonald while Nancy Lee was portrayed by Roz Hammond. Their two sons Michael and Gary were portrayed by Chad Hamilton and Riley Hamilton
