= P. J. Lane =

Australian actor and athlete

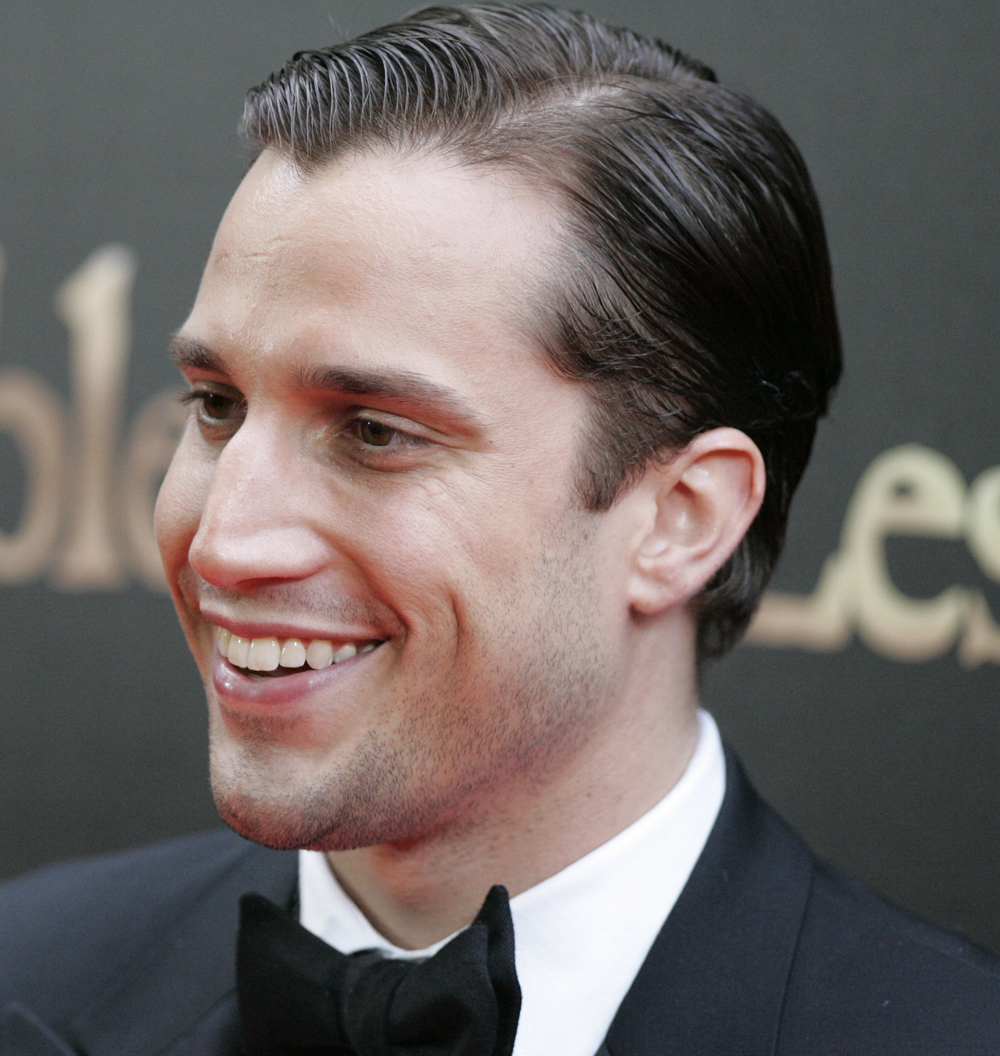
- Lane at the red carpet premiere at State Theatre, Sydney
- Born: Phillip Jacob Isaacson; 11 December 1984 (age 41); United States
- Occupations: Actor, singer, philanthropist, TV presenter
- Years active: 2009–present
- Website: Official website

Phillip Jacob Isaacson (born 11 December 1984), known professionally as P. J. Lane, is an American-born Australian actor, entertainer, philanthropist, school basketball coach and former professional basketball player.

== Early life ==
Born on 11 December 1984 in the United States, but raised in Australia, Lane is the only child of Jayne Ambrose and Logie Hall of Fame inductee Don Lane. Lane attained a performing arts scholarship to The Scots College in Sydney, Australia, at the age of 12. While attending Scots, Lane studied acting, voice, and classical piano.

Despite his family affiliation with show business, Lane was known as a young basketball prospect. Lane's father Don was the head basketball coach at St Aloysius' College. Lane often played for The Scots College with his father coaching the opposing team. Lane's basketball ability led him to complete his high-school education at Westlake High School in Westlake Village, California. While attending Westlake High, Lane continued his music study with former Beach Boys keyboard player Mike Meros.

== Basketball career ==
Upon his completion of high school, Lane was awarded a full basketball scholarship to Southern Connecticut State University. While attending SCSU, Lane majored in music and made the dean's list for academic performance. After university, Lane played for three seasons as a professional basketball player in the Greek league. He played for the teams of Apollon Patras BC, Aigio, and AS Manis.

Lane returned to Australia in 2009. An article in the Australian Women's Day stated that his father's deteriorating health brought him back to Australia and prevented him from returning to Europe despite some lucrative offers.

Lane continued to play basketball in the Australian Basketball Association Waratah League for the Hornsby Spiders.

== Television ==
Early in his career, Lane was the feature story on A Current Affair, performed live on Mornings with Kerri-Anne, and performed at the 2009 Carols in the Domain. After his father's death, Lane performed a Don Lane tribute at the Logie Awards of 2010.

In late 2009, Lane began presenting stories for Sydney Weekender on the Seven Network. According to the Sydney Weekender website, Lane was still a featured presenter in 2012.

== Acting ==
In early 2010, Lane was asked to audition for the Australian film 6 Plots. It was later accepted to the 2012 Cannes Film Festival and released in 2012. In July 2010, Lane appeared in the Australian television soap opera Neighbours as Sonya Mitchell's (Eve Morey) ex-boyfriend Eli Baker. He had originally auditioned for another role in May 2010 but was unsuccessful. Lane played the role of Michael Christiansen in Underbelly: Badness and had to put on 18 kg of muscle for the role. As of February 2026, his last on-screen acting role was a part in the 2014 movie Freedom.

== Charity work ==
Lane's father Don Lane died in October 2009 from complications with Alzheimer's disease. Since his father's death, Lane has been an ambassador for Alzheimer’s Australia to raise funds and awareness for the disease. Lane is the producer of the Memory Lane Concert, which raises funds for Alzheimer's Australia. In the variety style of The Don Lane Show, the concert showcases well-known performers in Australia. In a 2011 interview, Lane said that Alzheimer's and other forms of dementia are under-funded based on the number of people affected by the disease. The concert has featured the likes of Alan Jones, Rhonda Burchmore, David Campbell, Peter Cousens, Rob Mills, and other veterans of the industry. The 2011 concert was held at Sydney's State Theatre.
