= In Melbourne Today =

Early Australian television series

- Genre: Breakfast television
- Presented by: Geoff Corke
- Country of origin: Australia
- Original language: English

Production
- Running time: 3 hours

Original release
- Network: GTV-9
- Release: 26 October 1957 – 20 July 1958

In Melbourne Today is an early Australian television series, which aired in two versions in the 1950s, on Melbourne station GTV-9. It was Australia's first breakfast television series.

The first version aired on Saturdays at 7:30AM, and ran from 26 October 1957 to 5 April 1958, with episodes running for three hours. At the time, the other Melbourne stations usually began their broadcasting day in the afternoon, and as such In Melbourne Today was an early experiment in morning programming, pre-dating Sydney station ATN-7's October 1958 experiment. However, it would appear viewers weren't ready to watch television at 7:30AM, as after the series ended, GTV-9 stopped offering regular morning programs for several years.

Regulars in this version included host Geoff Corke, along with the Tune Twisters, newsreader Eric Pearce, Eric Welch (sports), Shirley Radford, Arlene Forrest, and Bill McCormack.

Occasionally the series aired live from a location, for example one of the episodes was broadcast from the beach at Sorrento. A different episode was broadcast from Geelong.

The second version of the series aired on Sundays at 4:00PM, and ran from 13 April to 20 July 1958. Again featuring Geoff Corke, Bill McCormack and Eric Pearce, this version also featured, Evie Hayes, Gretta Miers and Hal Todd. The Tune-Twisters presented a segment called "Music Shop" while John Casson did a segment called "I'll Tell You a Story". Later it aired at 2:30PM, with regular features also including "Children's Doctor" with Margaret Mackay and piano contest.

Four of the segments, The Gallery Comes to You, Children's Doctor, Bill McCormack and the Tunetwisters segments, were later spun off into their own series following the end of In Melbourne Today, though the episodes of these series were very short. For example, Children's Doctor and The Gallery Comes to You were combined into a single 15-minute time-slot, while Bill McCormack's show was a 15-minute series (it later expanded to being half-hour).

Bert Newton, who became famous for his appearances on In Melbourne Tonight, has said he was originally meant to appear on In Melbourne Today but due to a hold up in production, he never worked on the breakfast program. After being afforded the opportunity to do a live commercial on In Melbourne Tonight, he impressed executives so much he was told to "forget the breakfast program".

In 1989, Denise Drysdale and Ernie Sigley teamed up to host a modern-day version of In Melbourne Today which aired in Melbourne for several years before it aired nationally under its new title, Ernie & Denise.
