= Philip Brady (broadcaster) =

Australian media personality (1939–2025)

Philip Brady OAM
- Born: Philip Stuart Brady; 16 June 1939; East Melbourne, Victoria, Australia
- Died: 11 February 2025 (aged 85); Kew, Victoria, Australia
- Occupations: Media personality; talkback presenter; television personality; radio personality; voice-over
- Years active: 1958–2025

Philip Stuart Brady OAM (16 June 1939 – 11 February 2025) was an Australian media personality, radio producer and television identity and voice-over artist.

Brady started working in the broadcasting industry at the age of 18 and his career which spanned some 67 years, alongside his contemporary's like Bert Newton he had one of the longest media career's in Australia.

== Early life ==
Philip Brady was born, like many of Melbourne's Roman Catholic babies, at the Mercy Hospital, then at its original East Melbourne location (now the site of St Vincent's Private Hospital). He grew up in the suburb of Kew with his parents Wilfred and Raimonde, along with his siblings Diane and Jeannette. Wilfred was a psychiatrist and also a composer, with a number of noted popular songs to his credit.

His schooling included a Jesuit education at Xavier College, one of Melbourne's elite private schools, and he attended the senior school (in his home suburb) until he finished his education there in 1957 at the age of 18.

== TV and radio career ==
Brady started his working career beginning in television at the Nine Network in 1958 as a booth announcer (voice-overs).

He appeared with Graham Kennedy on In Melbourne Tonight in commercials and comedy sketches as well as compering the show on occasions. He occasionally appeared on The Tarax Show as "Prince Philip". He stayed at Channel 9 until 1971, when he lost his job when Nine cancelled its variety shows.

In the 1960s and 1970s, Brady hosted multiple television shows, including Concentration and Everybody's Talking for the Nine Network and Moneymakers, Junior Moneymakers, Casino Ten, Get the Message and Password for the 0–10 Network, and made guest appearances on television in the 1990s with a regular nostalgia segment on Good Morning Australia with Bert Newton, as well as guest appearances on Seven's Tonight Live with Steve Vizard and ABC's The Late Show.

Brady hosted radio shows on 3AK at various times during the 1960s and 1980s, and also had shifts on 3AW in the 1970s. He worked as producer for Bert Newton's morning show on 3UZ in the early 1980s. In 1986, Brady moved to the Gold Coast, and hosted a daytime radio show on Easy Listening 97 Tweed Heads for nearly five years.

Brady came back to Melbourne in 1990 and began a long-lasting partnership with Bruce Mansfield on talkback radio 3AW. Initially, they presented the Sunday night nostalgia program Remember When and some months later the duo took over the weeknight show Nightline as well.

On 2 February 2025, Brady retired from 3AW after over 30 years with the station. and a career in broadcasting after 67 years.

== Newspaper column and community work ==
In the 1980s, Brady wrote a weekly column in the show business newspaper TV Scene.

Brady was a member of the patrons council of the Epilepsy Foundation of Victoria and an Australia Day ambassador.

== Death ==
Brady died from pancreatic cancer on 11 February 2025 at the age of 85 in the Melbourne suburb of Kew.

== Awards ==
In 2003, Brady, with on-air partner Bruce Mansfield, won the Australian Commercial Radio Award for Best Networked Program for their Nightline program.

In the 2018 Queen's Birthday Honours, Brady was awarded the Medal of the Order of Australia (OAM) for services to the broadcasting industry.
