= Don Lane =

American talk show host (1933–2009)

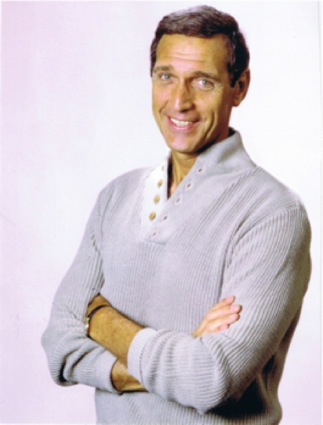
- Born: Morton Donald Isaacson; November 13, 1933; New York City, New York, U.S.
- Died: October 22, 2009 (aged 75); Sydney, New South Wales, Australia
- Resting place: Macquarie Park Cemetery and Crematorium
- Occupations: TV presenter; radio presenter; actor; night club performer; singer; sportscaster
- Years active: 1954–2003
- Children: P. J. Lane

Morton Donald Isaacson (November 13, 1933 – October 22, 2009), known professionally as Don Lane, was an American talk show host and singer active mostly in Australia, in which he was best known for his television career, especially for hosting Tonight with Don Lane and The Don Lane Show, which aired on the Nine Network from 1975 to 1983, and his appearances with Bert Newton.

== Early life ==
Lane was born Morton Donald Isaacson at the Manhattan "Flower Hospital" in New York City to a Jewish father (Jacob) and a Catholic mother (Dolly), who later converted to Judaism. Jacob "Jack" Isaacson was a sergeant in the New York City Police Department (NYPD) and Dolly was a homemaker. Morton was raised in The Bronx, where he attended DeWitt Clinton High School and was classmates with Judd Hirsch and Garry Marshall. By his mid-teens, due to his mother's influential personality, Isaacson had decided he wanted to be in show business. He even placed a star on his bedroom door. He started to entertain at parties he attended with his parents, usually doing a mixture of singing and comedy. Whilst at school he played varsity football and basketball for DeWitt Clinton High Later, he gained a football and basketball scholarship to Kalamazoo College in Kalamazoo, Michigan, where he spent three years.

== Early career ==
After leaving college, Isaacson formed a double act with his best friend Manny Glasser called "Donny and the Duke". The duo worked in local New York nightclubs for a few months before Isacson was drafted into the US Army at age 21. He was commissioned as an officer and served in the artillery. While in the army he formed a double act with fellow soldier Murray Levine, Isaacson usually playing the comic while his partner was the straight man. The double act went on to win the All-Army entertainment contest and earned them an appearance on The Ed Sullivan Show in 1955. One year later Isaacson won the All-Army entertainment contest again as a solo act. After his mandatory service in the army, he later toured for two years entertaining troops all over the United States.

After touring the country entertaining the troops as a solo performer, Isaacson started to work his act in the New York nightclubs. It was at this time that he adopted the stage name of "Don Lane", after fellow entertainer Frankie Laine. Lane worked his act in nightclubs throughout New York, Los Angeles and the showrooms in Las Vegas. During his stint in Las Vegas, he worked alongside Wayne Newton and was often a supporting act for performers such as Sammy Davis Jr. While in Los Angeles, Lane also worked as an actor and featured in national commercials for Coca-Cola, which Lane said "paid the bills for years". He then returned to New York and performed at weddings, nightclubs and parties.

In 1964 Lane was offered a contract to be the headline act at The Dunes Nightclub in Honolulu, Hawaii. This was his first offer to become a headliner and first guaranteed contract as a solo performer. Due to the lucrative offer The Dunes Nightclub made to him, he quickly relocated to Honolulu, where he first started to enjoy success as a headline performer. It was in Hawaii that he met his first wife, Gina, who was an exotic dancer.

== Australian television career ==
=== Tonight with Don Lane: 1965–1969 ===
In 1965, the Irish comedian Dave Allen presented a talk show on Sydney television for TCN-9. He was eventually sacked and Nine producer John Collins looked for replacement hosts to fill in for the rest of the season. After a series of temporary hosts, Collins found Lane working in The Dunes Nightclub in Hawaii. While in the United States, Collins asked Las Vegas performer Wayne Newton if there was anybody he should consider as a replacement; Newton's answer was "Don Lane".

Lane was offered the job after filming and sending in an audition tape for the TCN-9 executives. He was given the host's chair for six weeks. He planned to base his version of the show on Johnny Carson's Tonight Show. Lane's run was variously referred to as The Tonight Show, Tonight with Don Lane and Sydney Tonight. Within a month, Nine settled on Lane as permanent host. After four weeks, his original six-week contract was extended to forty weeks.

Tonight with Don Lane featured comedy sketches, interviews with visiting entertainers and musical numbers often performed by Lane with the Tonight Show Orchestra. The announcer for the show was Mike Walsh, who later went on to host his own successful variety show.

Due to technical restrictions, Lane's tonight show was only broadcast throughout New South Wales, just as In Melbourne Tonight (IMT) was restricted to Victoria. Work on the Sydney-Melbourne co-axial cable had begun in June 1959 and was completed on February 5, 1963. On July 7, 1965, Lane appeared on a live split-screen link with Graham Kennedy via the cable. Lane and Kennedy sang the song "Seventy-Six Trombones" as a duet. They took full advantage of the new technology, and the duet included the performers throwing jugs of water and Kennedy holding up a sign saying, "Go Home Yank", to which Lane laughed. Lane also performed another duet with Kennedy at the Logies ceremony in 1967.

In March 1968, Lane was charged with importing marijuana into Australia. He was arrested at Sydney Airport and remanded in custody. He strenuously claimed his innocence, claiming that the drugs were planted into his jacket pocket by a former business associate who wanted revenge. He was found not guilty on all charges, being defended by barrister Marcus Einfeld.

=== Return to the United States ===
When Lane's Tonight Show ended in 1969 he returned to the United States and the Las Vegas showrooms, this time appearing as a headline act. While in Las Vegas he played Professor Harold Hill in the Las Vegas production of The Music Man. The songs "Trouble" and "Seventy-Six Trombones", both from that musical, became his signature tunes. In 1972, he also appeared in the American comedy series The Ken Berry WOW Show, hosted by Ken Berry, which also featured Cheryl Ladd and Steve Martin. Lasting only five weeks, the Wow show was a sketch comedy series similar to the format of Saturday Night Live and was the summer replacement show for The Sonny & Cher Comedy Hour. Lane was a regular cast member on the show, which lasted three months.

=== The Don Lane Show: 1975–1983 ===
In 1975, Lane returned to Australia and appeared at a benefit concert for the victims of Cyclone Tracy. The concert was held at the Sydney Opera House and Lane sang and performed a sketch with Toni Lamond.

While in Sydney in 1975, Lane was chosen to replace Ernie Sigley as host of the Melbourne-based The Ernie Sigley Show. The night before, after filming for the first show of the season was completed, Sigley had criticised Nine Network boss Kerry Packer. Packer contacted Lane and the two flew down to Melbourne. Sigley was fired that afternoon and Lane took his place. Lane's replacement of Sigley was to result in continuing resentment, culminating in a fight in which Lane punched Sigley at the Logies ceremony in 1986.

Lane was to host two specials revamping the old In Melbourne Tonight. The producers wanted a "barrel boy" sidekick for Lane. Lane suggested Bert Newton:

I used to watch him and Graham working on IMT, and look at them with great envy. So I said 'what about Bert Newton?' If I'm going to work with somebody I want to know that he's as sharp as anything and a real pro.

Newton had hitherto been strongly identified with Australian TV presenter Graham Kennedy. Both Lane and Newton maintain that the first time they met was on-air, during the first episode of the Don Lane Show. Each describes that there was instant "chemistry" and that they never made any deliberate attempt to build the relationship; that it just happened. Lane described the on-screen chemistry during an interview in 2003:

We were magic from the time he walked out from the curtain …you don't try to explain those things. You just take them and you use them and you enjoy them and most of all you appreciate them, because they don't happen often, they happen once in a rare while.

The IMT special was a ratings success. The show was renamed The Don Lane Show and ran until 1983. Like its predecessor, the show was produced at the studios of GTV 9 in Melbourne and aired over the Nine Network. Lane's stint on the show was to make him the most highly paid performer on Australian television and The Don Lane Show is still the highest rated variety program in Australian television history.

The Don Lane Show featured big musical numbers, notable guests and comedy sketches. It was produced by Peter Faiman, who went on to direct Crocodile Dundee and the 2000 Olympics Opening Ceremony. Also featured was the 18-piece "Don Lane Orchestra" conducted by musical director Graeme Lyall and announcer Pete Smith. The show went live-to-air twice a week on Mondays and Thursdays, usually running for ninety minutes from 9:30 to 11.00 pm, although, depending on the length of interviews and "the wheel" segment, it could finish much later. On one occasion, it ran two hours over time while Sammy Davis Jr. was escorted by a police car from his concert to the studio in a surprise for Lane. Lane and Newton also did infomercials in which they were given free rein to improvise.

The show broke down Australia's "distance barriers" and used innovative technology to conduct satellite interviews with prominent entertainers overseas. Most major recording artists visiting Australia from overseas were guests on the show. Among the live performances and interviews were ABBA, Adam Ant, David Bowie, Bucks Fizz, Chubby Checker, Dr. Hook, Duran Duran, Sheena Easton, John Farnham, Aretha Franklin, Hall & Oates, Colleen Hewett, Whitney Houston, Elton John, Kiss, Jerry Lee Lewis, John Mellencamp, Olivia Newton-John, Roy Orbison, Robert Palmer, Tom Petty, the Pointer Sisters, Cliff Richard, Lionel Richie, Demis Roussos, Leo Sayer, Boz Scaggs, Del Shannon, Tina Turner, the Village People, Tom Waits, Dionne Warwick, Stevie Wonder, and John Paul Young. Robin Williams made his first talk show appearance on the show and Lane once played tennis with Charlton Heston and also performed in a sketch with The Osmonds and performed duets with people such as Vic Damone, Cilla Black, Debbie Reynolds and Lane's idol, Sammy Davis Jr.

On Lane's 47th birthday in 1980, during an episode of the show he received a telegram from Kiss (who at the time were touring Australia) wishing him a happy birthday and apologising for not being able to be there. He then received a surprise on-set visit from Gene Simmons and Ace Frehley. During a chat with Frehley (who like Lane grew up in The Bronx) it was revealed that both had attended DeWitt Clinton High School.

Although The Don Lane Show featured major acts from around the world, it was also known for helping young local entertainers to establish themselves. John Farnham was featured on numerous occasions and attributes Lane to helping his career:

He helped me over my nerves on being on live TV, he always had something positive to say and always gave me much-needed advice, which I still rely heavily on today.

Uri Geller, Doris Stokes and broadcaster Kevin Arnett regularly appeared on The Don Lane Show discussing psychic and paranormal themes. On one occasion in 1980, the skeptic James Randi was a guest on the program. After Randi criticised one of the show's regulars, a heated exchange occurred at the end of the interview, which led to Lane saying, "we're going for a commercial break and you can piss off. We'll be back with Diana Trask". Lane then walked off the set, sweeping the props from the small table, to audience applause. The aftermath of the event led to a national apology for using profanity, which was televised on the Nine Network, but he stood by his behaviour towards Randi.

Due to new management at Channel 9 and its expensive budget, the show was cancelled despite still having strong ratings. During its time on air the show often gained a 30 per cent share of all viewers in the ratings. The Don Lane Show ended on November 13, 1983, Lane's 50th birthday. His final episode ran for two and a half hours and featured such stars as Billy Connolly, Phyllis Diller and David Bowie as well as musical appearances by John Farnham and Colleen Hewett. After tributes from Bert Newton and many guests, Lane ended his final show with an emotional performance of Peter Allen's "Once Before I Go". He then took a final bow with "The Don Lane Show" written in lights behind him and the screen faded to black.

=== Channel 10 ===
When The Don Lane Show finished, Lane moved to Los Angeles in an attempt to pursue a career in film and US television. The most notable thing he auditioned for during that period was the role of Eddie Valiant in Who Framed Roger Rabbit. He was a finalist for the role when the director could not get any A-listers to accept it.

In 1987 Lane was back in Australia working with Network Ten where he hosted two short-lived comedy shows: You've Got to Be Joking (which featured practical jokes) and Talkin' To Kids with Don Lane. Both were attempts to be in a popular children's show that his son could watch, then go to school and tell his classmates who were talking about it that that was his dad in the show. He also hosted the 1987 Logie Awards. The following year, Lane fronted his own talk show for Ten entitled Late Night Australia, eventually changed to Late Night Oz. The program aired five nights a week at 10:30 pm and was up against Graham Kennedy's News Show on the Nine Network and Clive Robertson's Newsworld on the Seven Network. Late Night Oz was cancelled after just six months.

=== Sportscasting career: 1991–1996 ===
Lane's career surged again in 1991, this time in the role of a sportscaster. Lane's passion for American football and basketball found a home on the ABC, where he continued to win fans and a new audience for the sports he loved. ABC sports boss David Salter was interested in televising NFL games from the United States with a host who could transcend both American football and rugby league. When learning of Lane's love for both codes, he put him in the host's chair, where he would stay for nearly six years.

Lane hosted American NFL broadcasts twice a week and would give enthusiastic weekly reviews of all games with explanations of the rules for the Australian audience. He was flown to the United States to host live broadcasts from Super Bowl XXVII and Super Bowl XXVIII, which was the first time an Australian broadcaster had done live coverage from a Super Bowl.

In 1993 the sports department expanded at the ABC, and Lane hosted NCAA basketball and football for the network for the following two years. He was also a colour commentator for NBL telecasts on the ABC and Foxtel.

=== Late television career ===
Lane made a guest appearance on the very last episode of The Late Show on the ABC in 1993. Lane closed the show singing "Saturday Night is the Loneliest Night of the Week". When finished with the song, the Late Show big band played the theme for The Don Lane Show and Lane went behind the camera to film audience members, just as he ended most Don Lane Shows.

In 1994, Lane hosted two specials for the Nine Network of The Best of The Don Lane Show. Each special was two hours dedicated to the most memorable moments from The Don Lane Show. In an interview in 1994, Lane explained that coming back to The Don Lane Show environment was very emotional:

The eight and a half years of that television show is firmly embedded in the minds of many people, and firmly branded into the heads of us. Those were very special years, and to have that all come together meant so much to all of us.

Lane was honoured in a 1996 episode of This Is Your Life dedicated to him and his career in television. The episode featured tributes from John Farnham, Billy Connolly, Bert Newton, and Garry Marshall.

Lane was also involved in a special entitled Don Lane's America and hosted such programs as The Mad Mad World of Sports and 40 Years of Television. He also hosted a special for Channel 9 titled The Best of Studio 9. The special highlighted the shows and memorable moments that were filmed in Studio 9 in Melbourne.

Lane also returned to sportscasting in 2001 to broadcast the Super Bowl on SBS.

== Radio career ==
During his time on The Don Lane Show, Lane also hosted a morning radio program with Bert Newton on radio station 3UZ in Melbourne. Newton tells a story of how he and the producer pretended to be on-air and gave out Lane's home address to the listeners. Newton claims that the joke was worth it to see Lane's reaction but that Lane repaid him for the practical joke. The program on 3UZ had many guests who had also appeared on the television show the night before. When moving to Sydney in 1987, Lane hosted a morning show on 2UE for two years. After ending his affiliation with 2UE, he moved to 2KY and hosted a competing breakfast program in 1989. His radio programs usually involved music and interviews with visiting entertainers.

== Cabaret performer ==
Because of his Las Vegas nightclub background, Lane would work in clubs and theatres throughout Sydney, Melbourne and the Gold Coast. He would work nightclubs, theatres and theatre restaurants when he was not working on television. When first arriving in Australia and hosting his tonight show, an agent named Richard Gray saw the appeal that Lane had and asked him to come and do his "act" at South Sydney Junior Rugby League Club, which was one of Sydney's premier venues. Lane then worked in clubs all over Sydney when his show was not in season, perfecting his act and carrying on from his early nightclub experience.

During the era of The Don Lane Show, Lane would perform at Melbourne's premier theatre venues such as The Princess Theatre and Her Majesty's Theatre. Don Lane in Concert was a television special in 1980 which showed Lane's 90-minute stage act live on Channel 9. The musical director for The Don Lane Show, Graeme Lyall, was under contract with the network, so any song which Lane liked was made into an arrangement for an 18-piece orchestra with three backing vocalists. During the Don Lane in Concert television special, Lane performed his signature tunes such as "Seventy-Six Trombones" and "Trouble". But Lane also performed songs that were new at the time such as "I Still Call Australia Home", "They're Playing Our Song" and "'She's Out of My life"'. Each song was arranged to accommodate Lane's "crooning" style by musical director Graeme Lyall. Entertainment reporter Peter Ford of radio 2UE described Lane's club act:

Don was a terrific television personality. But when you saw Don doing his floor show, whether in clubs or theatres, when he had a live audience and band he really owned that stage. Don Lane knew how to work a room and gave us Las Vegas "pizazz" whenever he performed.

Lane was responsible for the name of the original club entertainment awards, the "MO" Awards. Originally named the New South Wales Star Awards, the awards took on the name coined by Lane when they went national. His suggestion not only proved to be a popular name for the awards, it also honours the memory of one of Australia's greatest clowns and comics – Roy Rene, who became a legend in the entertainment industry using the stage name of "Mo" McCackie. Lane was a recipient of five Mo Awards.

Lane was a patron of the Australian Club Entertainment (ACE) Awards, and was honored in 2006 when he was presented with the Lifetime Achievement Award at the ACE Awards ceremony.

Lane was still performing in 2005 in nightclubs all over Sydney.

Lane released several recordings of his musical performances, including in 1976 the LP "You're Everything".

== Personal life ==
Lane married Jayne Ambrose, a talent agent, with whom he had a son, Phillip Jacob "P.J." Isaacson. His son moved to the United States and then to Europe to further his basketball career, although he later became an entertainer in his own right using the name P. J. Lane. He moved back to Sydney in 2009 after taking care of his ailing father. Although Lane and Ambrose later divorced, they remained good friends, and she was his agent for the rest of his life.

In 2007, Lane released his tell-all autobiography entitled Never Argue With a Mug. The book follows Lane's career and explains in details show-business scandals which he had personally experienced.

In June 2008, it was announced that Lane was suffering from Alzheimer's disease and had been living in a care facility for a number of years. News of Lane's condition was saddening for the entertainment community in Australia who viewed him as a TV legend. This explained the lack of public appearances that Lane had made since his induction into the Logie Awards Hall of Fame in 2003.

== Logie awards ==
=== National honours ===
Association	Award	Year	Work	Results
Logie Awards	Gold Logie	1977	Most Popular TV Personality	Won
Logie Awards	Logie Award Hall of Fame	2003		Honoured
Logie Awards	Silver Logie	1977	Most Popular Male Personality	Won
Logie Awards	Silver Logie	1977	Most Popular Male (Victoria)	Won
Logie Awards	Silver Award	1977	Most Popular Show	Won

The Logie Awards were made in each state separately during the 1960s and early 1970s, since it was technically difficult to broadcast live programming interstate. Lane performed in Sydney while Graham Kennedy held the same timeslot in Melbourne.

=== State honours ===
New South Wales Logies:

Association	Awards	Year	Work	Results
Logie Award	Silver Award for Most Popular Male/Silver for Most Popular Show	1966	Tonight with Don Lane	Won
Logie Awards	Silver Award for Most Popular Male/Silver for Most Popular Live Show	1967	Tonight with Don Lane	Won
Logie Awards	Silver Award for Best Male Personality/Silver Award for Best Show	1968	Tonight with Don Lane	Won
Logie Awards	Best Male Personality and Best Show	1969	Tonight with Don Lane	Won
Logie Awards	Silver Award for Best Male Personality and Silver Award Best Local Show	1970	Tonight with Don Lane	Won
Logie Awards	Silver Award for Most Popular Male and Silver Award for Most Popular Show	1974	The Don Lane Show	Won

In 2003, Lane was inducted into the TV Week Logie Awards Hall of Fame. In 2010, after his death, his son performed a tribute to him.

=== Mo Awards ===
The Australian Entertainment Mo Awards (commonly known informally as the Mo Awards), were annual Australian entertainment industry awards. They recognise achievements in live entertainment in Australia from 1975 to 2016. Don Lane won 4 awards in that time. Lane hosted the event thrice (in 1976, 1997 and 1999).

Year	Nominee / work	Award	Result (wins only)
1975	Don Lane	Act of the Year	Won
1979	Don Lane	Daily Telegraph Readers' Award	Won
1980	Don Lane	Daily Telegraph Readers' Award	Won
1981	Don Lane	Daily Telegraph Readers' Award	Won

== Death and public memorial ==
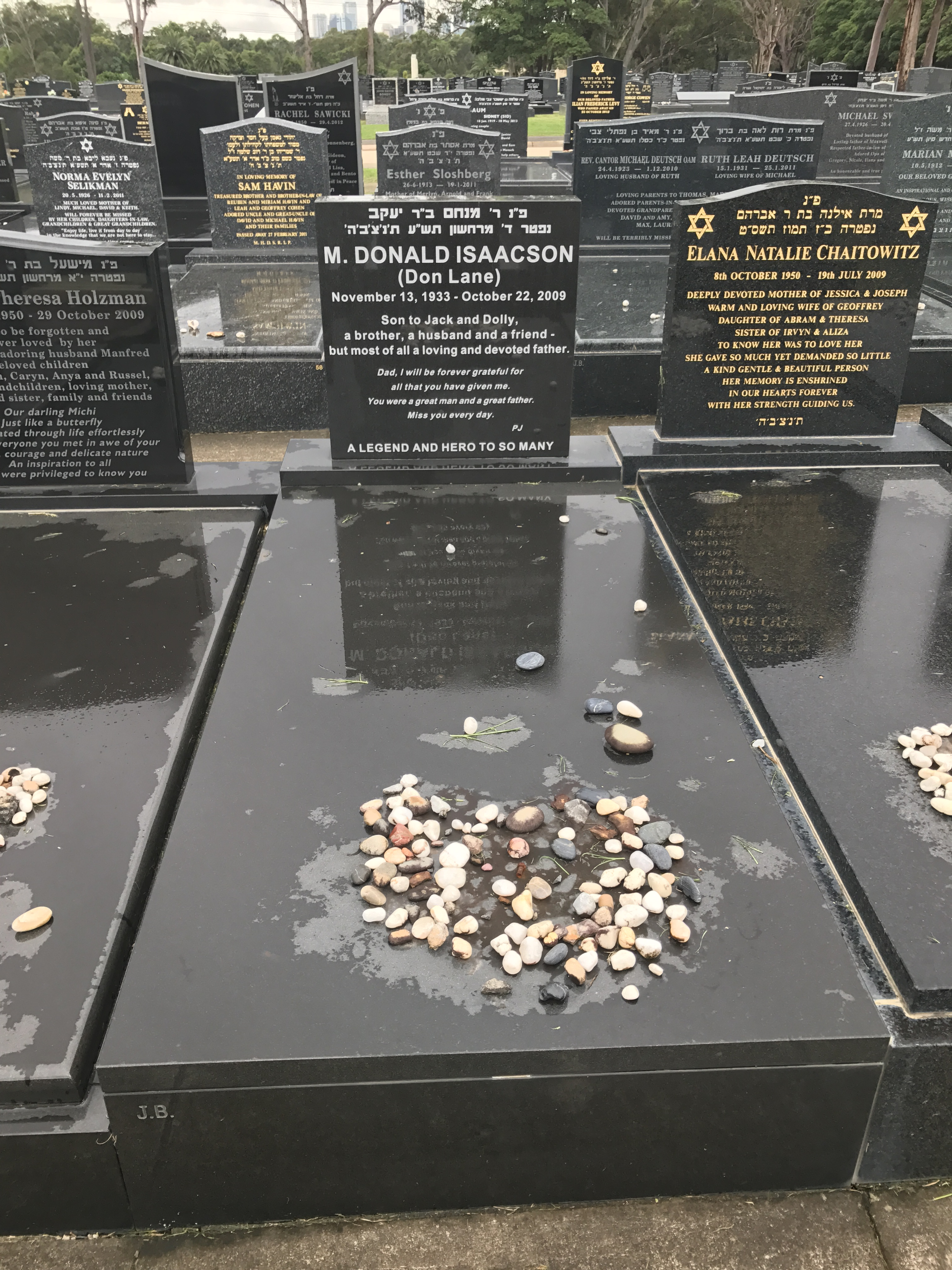
Lane's grave at Macquarie Park.

Lane died from a dementia-related illness caused by Alzheimer's disease on October 22, 2009, in Sydney. During the last eighteen months of his life, due to his deteriorating health, he relocated from his Sydney apartment to Montefiore Nursing Home in Randwick in Sydney's east. A private Jewish funeral ceremony and burial attended by close family and friends was held at Macquarie Park Cemetery and Crematorium a day after his death.

On November 5, 2009, a public memorial was held for Lane at the South Sydney Junior Rugby League Club. The memorial was open to all members of the public, who were asked only for a donation to Alzheimer's Australia. Over 1,100 people crammed into the showroom at the club, which had a usual capacity of only 600. Other members of the public viewed the memorial on televisions around the club. The memorial celebration featured live performances and speeches from Lane's close friends, such as Rhonda Burchmore, Bert Newton, Mike McColl-Jones, Mike Cleary, Toni Lamond and Helen Reddy. Lane's son opened the memorial with "They're Playing Our Song", which was his father's opening number, and earned a standing ovation for his performance. Lane was remembered as a generous performer who possessed a matching personality off the television screen as he did on. During Bert Newton's tribute, he removed his toupee, to reveal largely bare terrain underneath. The memorial ended with a recording of Lane's performance of "Once Before I Go" on the final Don Lane Show, which received a standing ovation to audience tears and applause.
