= Remick =

Remick is a surname. Notable people with the surname include:

- Bertha Remick (1872-1965), American artist and composer
- Dylan Remick (born 1991), American soccer player
- Elinor Remick Warren (1900–1991), American composer
- Glenn Remick (1951–2009), American darts player
- Jerome Remick (1928–2005), Canadian numismatist
- Jerome H. Remick (1867–1931), American music publisher
- Lee Remick (1935–1991), American actress
