= Happy Hammond =

Australian comedian, children's host and TV pioneer

- Born: Harry Montague Hammond; 7 May 1916; Summer Hill, New South Wales, Australia
- Died: 1 April 1998 (aged 81); Melbourne, Victoria, Australia
- Occupations: Comedian; radio host; television host; television producer
- Years active: 1947−1991

Harry Montague Hammond (7 May 1916 – 1 April 1998), professionally known as Happy Hammond, was an Australian comedian, radio host, children's television show host, and television producer. He hosted children's entertainment programmes Tarax Show on GTV-9 (1957–1960) and Happy Show (1960–1969) on HSV-7. Hammond was known for his bright personality and wearing a tartan suit and hat, sometimes referred to as his "test pattern" outfit, with colours that clashed in real life but worked well on black-and-white TV. His catchphrase was "Is everybody happy?" and the theme song for his show was "Happy Days Are Here Again".

== Biography and broadcasting career ==
Happy Hammond was born as Harry Montague Hammond on 7 May 1916 in the Sydney suburb of Summer Hill. He was the youngest of three children to father Alfred (musical instrument mechanic) and mother Ida (née Scott) Hammond. Both parents were deaf and mute. He attended Ashfield Junior Technical School, Sydney (1928-1932). Hammond worked as a grocer’s boy, sweets salesman, clerk, lorry driver (delivering and selling bread in the early 1940s) and electrician’s assistant.

The nickname "Happy" developed from his time in the Australian Army during World War II. He enlisted in the Citizen Military Force on 15 December 1941. When his fellow soldiers complained of carrying their gear he put up a sign, "The Happy Club", on a nearby tree. He transferred to the Australian Army Entertainment Unit of Second Australian Imperial Force on 30 November 1942 as a senior sergeant and served overseas, on New Britain and Bougainville Island, from 11 June 1945. As the "Boomerangs", his ensemble entertained Australian troops in those combat areas. Hammond performed in a comedy duo with the compere as his straight man, Keith Glover, who later went on to join the Australian Broadcasting Corporation (ABC). After he was discharged in June 1946, the pair undertook their act on the Tivoli circuit, with "modest success". On 8 July 1944 Hammond had married bookkeeper Rita Joyce Hedger (died 1979).

Hammond's broadcasting career began in his then-home town of Geelong when he became the breakfast radio announcer at 3GL. While there, he made his first TV appearance in 1948, as part of an exhibition using closed-circuit TV equipment for trial purposes. He then moved to Adelaide's 5KA, before returning to Victoria to work first at 3AW and then 3UZ, both in Melbourne. At 3UZ, he hosted The Happy Show, a children's program, as well as partnering the young Graham Kennedy, following the death of Nicky Whitta in September 1956. Hammond joined television station GTV-9. Shortly after, he invited Kennedy to appear on a telethon, where the latter was noticed by producer, Norman Spencer, leading to Kennedy joining the channel as well.

On TV, the Tarax Happy Show (later the Tarax Show) started on Melbourne's GTV-9 in January 1957, debuting from the Myer Emporium's Lonsdale Street store window. During Hammond's time at GTV-9, the program was only seen in Victoria, where it competed with Young Seven on HSV-7.

Hammond switched to HSV-7 in 1960, where The Happy Show, no longer sponsored by Tarax, featured Princess Panda (Panda Lisner), Lovely Anne (Anne Watt), Parer the Magician (Tommy Parer), Funny Face (Vic Gordon), Big John (John D'Arcy), Robbie Rob (Bob Horsfall), Cousin Roy (Roy Lyons) and Sylvester the Talking Sock (Ian Wiliams). The program was also relayed to ATN-7 in Sydney. During Watt's absence for her honeymoon in early 1965, her place was taken by a young Olivia Newton-John. Hammond was famous for his bright personality and wearing a tartan suit and hat, sometimes referred to as his "test pattern" outfit, with colours that clashed in real life but worked well on black-and-white television. His catchphrase was "Is everybody happy?" and the theme song for his show was "Happy Days Are Here Again".

Hammond's program won a Logie Award in 1959 (the Logies' inaugural year) for Most Popular Children's Show, and Hammond himself won a Logie in 1962 for Outstanding Contributions to Children's Entertainment. After the cancellation of The Happy Show in 1969, Hammond moved to produce daytime television morning shows and afternoon children's shows and, in his later years, had an off-camera role in HSV-7's videotape department until retiring in 1983. Although every year until the 1990s he continued to appear on the station's Royal Children's Hospital Good Friday Appeal. He was occasionally seen on Shirl's Neighbourhood.

Limited footage remains from Happy Hammond's career. The most commonly seen clip is a musical finger-clicking routine. A very small number of kinescopes of The Happy Show are held by the National Film and Sound Archive, despite the heavy Wiping of that era. Hammond was a keen supporter of the Geelong Football Club in the Victorian Football League. On Grand Final day in 1963, he was accorded the honour of running through the banner with the Geelong players before the game, which Geelong won.

He lived in Bentleigh East and had a holiday house at Rosebud. Hammond died at Rosebud on 1 April 1998 after being diagnosed with heart disease. He was survived by two adopted daughters and his long-term companion, Norma Burnside.
