= In Melbourne Tonight =

Australian variety television program

- Genre: Variety
- Written by: Mike McColl-Jones; Fred Parsons
- Presented by: Graham Kennedy
- Voices of: Pete Smith; Paul Jennings
- Opening theme: In Melbourne Tonight by Lee Gallagher; Gee, But You're Swell by: Abel Baer; Charles Tobias
- Country of origin: Australia
- Original language: English
- No. of seasons: 14 (1957–1970); 3 (1996–1998)

Production
- Production location: Melbourne
- Running time: 75 minutes

Original release
- Network: Nine Network
- Release: 6 May 1957 – 27 November 1998

In Melbourne Tonight, also known as IMT, is a nightly Logie award-winning Australian variety television show produced at GTV-9 Melbourne from 6 May 1957 to 1970.

== Overview ==
Graham Kennedy was the show's main host and star attraction, but other presenters were often called on to present the show on certain nights. In Melbourne Tonight had as many as 50 different presenters over its 13 years on air. The format of the show was inspired by the American The Tonight Show on NBC, but Kennedy's exuberant charisma was the key to the success of IMT.

The show originally had its own self-titled theme song, written by IMT's first band leader, Lee Gallagher, but for most of its run, it adopted an uptempo version of the swing tune of Gee, But You're Swell, written by Abel Baer and Charles Tobias in 1936.

Geoff Corke was Kennedy's offsider until 1959, when Bert Newton joined GTV-9 from HSV-7 to become Kennedy's straight man. This began a professional partnership that continued for many years and a friendship that continued until Kennedy's death in 2005.

Other In Melbourne Tonight regulars included Joff Ellen, Val Ruff, Panda Lisner, Anne Marie Fabry, Evie Hayes, Mary Hardy, Rosie Sturgess, Patti McGrath (later Patti Newton), Toni Lamond, Philip Brady, Johnny Ladd, Buster Fiddess, Frank Rich, Jack Little, Noel Ferrier, Elaine McKenna, Bill McCormick, Honnie Van Den Bosch ("barrel girl"), Ted Hamilton, Lesley Baker, The Tune Twisters, and the GTV or Channel 9 Ballet.

The ballet troupe was known as the Royal Dancers. Performers included Denise Drysdale and Roma Egan, directed by Valmai Ennor, a former dancer with the Sadler's Wells Ballet.

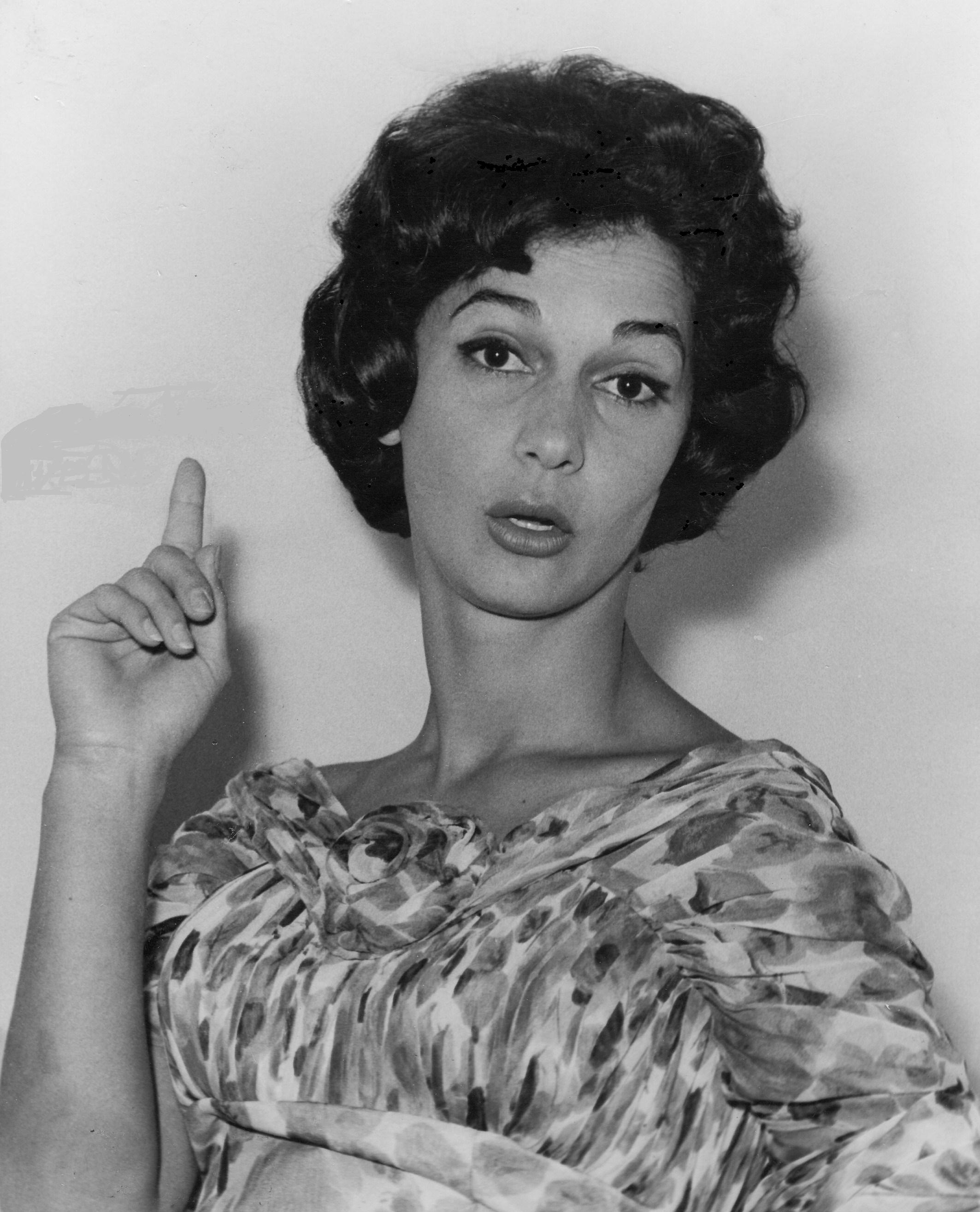
Anne Marie Fabry appeared on IMT as Graham Kennedy's "French secretary"

From 1960, a Friday-night, syndicated, "national" edition of the program aired under the title The Graham Kennedy Show (later The Graham Kennedy Channel Nine Show), with highlights packages being shown as The Best of IMT and The Best of Kennedy.

On 7 July 1965, IMT featured a then-innovative interstate live split-screen link with The Tonight Show on TCN-9 Sydney, via the recently completed co-axial cable linking Melbourne and Sydney.

Kennedy signed off from In Melbourne Tonight on 23 December 1969 after 12 years. On his final program, he was given a crown—made by the GTV-9 props department—symbolising his reign as king of Australian television.

The following year, IMT continued with four hosts, each on a different night of the week—Jimmy Hannan, Ugly Dave Gray, Bert Newton, and Stuart Wagstaff. The program was gradually scaled back from four nights a week to three, then two, with the remaining shows renamed as The Ugly Dave Gray Show and Tonight With Stuart Wagstaff until they were finally axed in March 1971.

On 20 October 1970, during one of the final programs under the IMT banner, British actor Patrick Wymark was scheduled to appear as a guest to promote a theatre play and a TV special. His nonappearance prompted jokes between host Stuart Wagstaff and guest Richard Deacon until news reached GTV-9 that Wymark had collapsed in his hotel room. His death was announced at the end of the program.

In Melbourne Tonight was attributed to positioning GTV-9 as a local broadcast leader in launching a variety of live programs in the ensuing decades. Most of the videotapes were erased and reused after broadcast, so fewer than 100 episodes survive today out of the thousands produced and broadcast.

When Kennedy returned to GTV-9 in the early 1970s, he launched his own weekly variety show for the Nine Network, The Graham Kennedy Show, but it did not recapture the success of the original In Melbourne Tonight, and was later succeeded by The Ernie Sigley Show and The Don Lane Show.

=== Advertisements ===
Drawing on his radio experience with Nicky Whitta (who had routinely "sent up" advertisers), Kennedy transformed the live commercials from what would have otherwise been dull pro forma obligations into a unique comedic art form. On one famous occasion, a scheduled 20-second ad spot for an aspirin product was spun out into 33 minutes of improvised comedy.

A 2003 article in The Age describes Graham's approach to live commercials:

The blood would drain from the face of Pelaco shirt-wearing executives in television, advertising and business until they realised that instead of televisual suicide, this skinny little wiseguy was commercial gold. And then they liked his brand of humour a lot.

In his 1977 memoir, Bert Newton noted that a commercial HE shared with Graham for Raoul Merton ('Of comfort you're certain when you wear Raoul Merton') changed the footwear buying habits of men.

=== Sam Chisholm ===
Gerald Stone recounts in his book Compulsive Viewing that a "cocky young salesman" visited the IMT set hoping for an extra plug for his employer's product. The young salesman was Sam Chisholm, who later became a senior executive for variously the Packer and Murdoch media empires. A May 2005 interview with Chisholm records:

Sam Chisholm: I was working for Johnson's wax at the time, and I don't think he believed my ...
Graham Davis: Sales pitch.
Sam Chisholm: Assertions about this product. So I said, "I'll go and polish your floors and prove it to you." Which I did.
Graham Davis: Over at his home?
Sam Chisholm: Absolutely.
Graham Davis: You got down on your hands and knees at his home?
Sam Chisholm: Yep. I started off as his housekeeper and ended up being his boss.

=== Rover ===
Kennedy requested a "reject" dog from the Jack Davey Memorial Guide Dog Centre and was given a Labrador Retriever, which he named "Rover".

Rover was sometimes brought into the studio to assist with advertisements for Pal dog food. One night, the dog showed no interest whatsoever in the product, which Kennedy then himself proceeded to eat with apparent relish, straight from the can – or so it seemed.

Rover also achieved television immortality by relieving himself – live to air – upon one of the huge cameras. The studio audience collapsed in hysterics, but the duration and urgency of Rover's impressively hydraulic performance might have led some cynics to question just how impromptu the event really was.

Biographer Blundell quotes Ernie Carroll:

Pal dog food, with Rover [...] was time consuming [...] once we fed him all afternoon so that when he came out to do the commercial, he didn't want to touch the Pal dog food. He was already full of it. [...] on another occasion they had him drink before the show, big drinks. So when he came out, he peed all over the camera and all around the set [...] Even those seemingly innocent dog manoeuvres were carefully planned.

Kennedy was exasperated for decades by questions about "whatever happened to Rover". As late as 1989, on Graham Kennedy's News Hour (see below), he answered a viewer's question couched in exactly those words with the withering reply "... he was a dog. What do you think happened?"

In early June 2005, on the 3AW program Nightline with Philip Brady and Bruce Mansfield, Patti (McGrath) Newton stated that her father had often looked after Rover when he appeared at GTV-9. It seems that Kennedy had become increasingly irritated with retrieving Rover from the pound, so when Patti's father's dog died, Rover went on to a long and happy life at the McGrath (senior) household.

== Late-1990s version ==
In 1996, the format was revived under the title IMT, hosted by Frankie J. Holden and screened as a Monday-night variety show. Featured on the show were the comedic stylings of Steven Jacobs, Denise Drysdale, Ann-Maree Biggar, and Julia Morris, who was best known for presenting "The Morris Report", a comedic take on the news events of the previous week. The show ran until 27 November 1998.

== See also ==
- List of Australian television series
- Enjoy Yourself Tonight
- In Melbourne Today
