= Graham Kennedy =

Australian entertainer, comedian and variety performer

Graham Kennedy AO
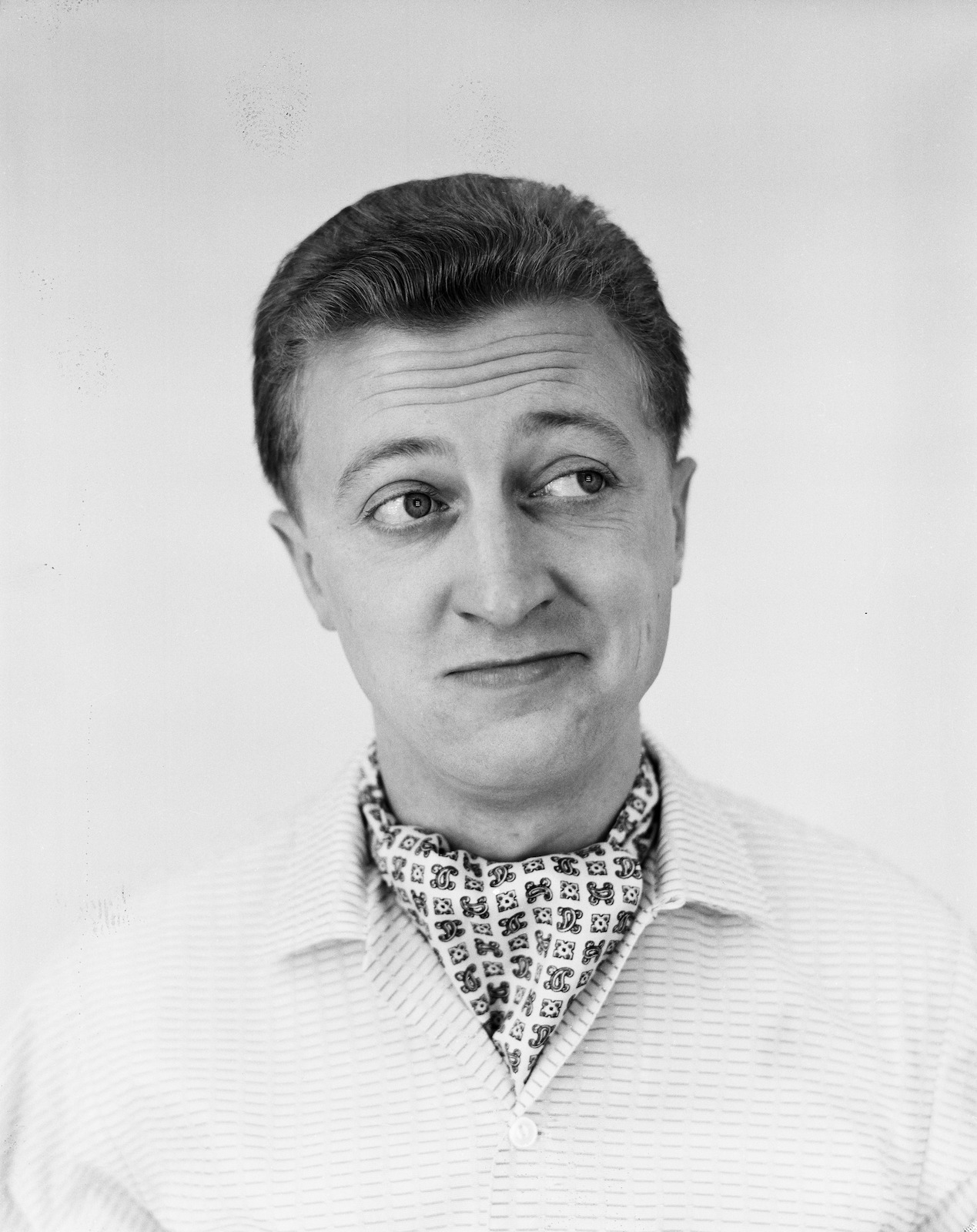
- Kennedy in 1960
- Born: Graham Cyril Kennedy; 15 February 1934; Melbourne, Australia
- Died: 25 May 2005 (aged 71); Bowral, New South Wales, Australia
- Occupations: Variety performer; comedian; radio host; television personality; stage and screen actor
- Notable work: In Melbourne Tonight; Blankety Blanks; Australia's Funniest Home Videos
- Television: The Graham Kennedy Show
- Awards: Order of Australia, 6 x Gold Logie winner

Graham Cyril Kennedy AO (15 February 1934 – 25 May 2005) was an Australian entertainer, comedian and variety performer, radio and television host as well as a personality and actor of theatre, television and film. He was often referred to as "The King of Television" or simply "The King" and called "Gra Gra" (pronounced "gray-gray").

Honoured as an officer of the Order of Australia, he was a six-time recipient of the Gold Logie, including the Logie Hall of Fame award, and won the Star of the Year Award in 1959. He is the most awarded star of Australian television. He was known for his radio and television collaboration's with Bert Newton, including on In Melbourne Tonight and The Graham Kennedy Show.

== Early life ==
=== Childhood and education ===
Kennedy was born in Camden Street, Balaclava, a suburb of Melbourne to Cyril William Kennedy and Mary Austin Kennedy (née Scott). Kennedy's mother, who was 18 years old at the time of his birth, was employed at a local picture theatre. His father worked variously as an engineer and handyman, mowed lawns and washed cars. In 1939 he joined the RAAF as an air gunner. Kennedy's first home was a "small, crowded duplex" at 32 Nelson Street, Balaclava. A 20 cm diameter plaque was placed on the property by the City of Port Phillip, coincidentally in the week of Kennedy's death.

When Kennedy was two years old, his parents moved to Carlisle Street, St Kilda, for two years. His parents divorced shortly before World War II and Kennedy was largely raised by his grandparents, "Pop" Kennedy (who had been an electrician at Melbourne's Tivoli, Royal and Bijou theatres) and "Grandma Scott", to whom he remained particularly close until her death. Kennedy later said that he had:

often wished his mother and father had never married. 'I wasn't enamoured of either of them [...] they betrayed me [...] divorce is not too much fun for a little nine-year-old [...]

After Kennedy's death, an article in The Bulletin by his friend and colleague John Mangos recorded that:

... he would sometimes talk about the violent arguments between his parents, how he gravitated to his grandmother's bosom, his two uncles ("one fought the Germans, the other fought the Japs") and how one of them took liberties with the boy. Graham never resented him, claiming he equated it with affection.

Kennedy was educated firstly at Euston College (which no longer exists) on the corner of Chapel and Carlisle streets, secondly at Caulfield North Central School (now Caulfield Junior College) and finally at Melbourne High School, South Yarra. In 1977, Kennedy chaired a project to raise funds for improvements at Melbourne High which raised more than $100,000 in its first year.

=== After school ===
During a school break in 1949, Kennedy worked at his uncle's hairdressing shop at 475 Collins Street, where he met clients who worked in the same building for the Radio Australia shortwave service of the Australian Broadcasting Commission (ABC). He accepted a job as a news runner from Collins Street to the ABC studios in Lonsdale Street. Shortly after he joined radio station 3UZ, working in the station's record library.

== Radio career ==
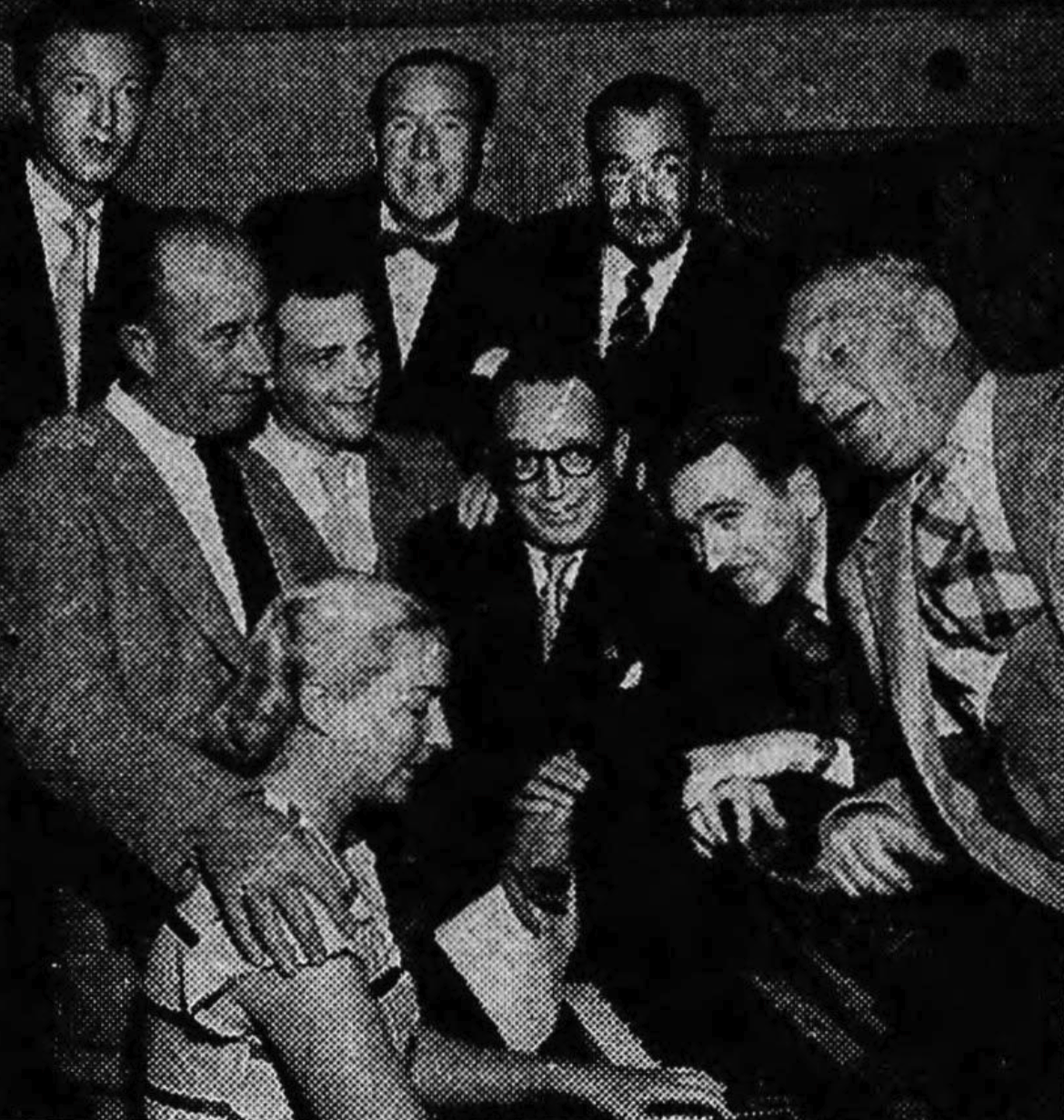
Kennedy (top left) at a Radio 3UZ staff show, 1954

=== 3UZ and "Nicky" ===
Clifford "Nicky" Nicholls Whitta was a Melbourne radio personality. A radio performer since 1932, he presented a housewives' program, as well as "Chatterbox Corner" with his wife Nancy Lee (Kathleen Lindgren). In an era when Australian radio announcers routinely adopted false British accents and a "hard-sell" approach to advertisements, Whitta's authentic Australian voice and irreverent attitude towards his sponsors brought him a large audience. In Nancy Lee's 1979 biography Being a Chum Was Fun she says: "Nicky went on to become the most popular announcer ever on Melbourne radio".

In his foreword to Nancy Lee's book, Kennedy wrote:

About 40 years ago, when I was a snow haired six year old, I can remember being totally captivated by a grown man pretending to be a naughty little boy on 3AW's children session called "Chatterbox Corner". His name was Clifford Whitta, and he was to become the most important man in my life. Years later I was even more fascinated with this man when he conducted a breakfast program and let the boy who played his records actually talk on the air with him.

Nicholls moved from 3KZ to 3UZ (where Kennedy was working), bringing with him his teenage panel operators Alf "Alfie Boy" Thesinger and Russell Archer. However, eighteen-year-olds, Thesinger and Archer were conscripted for National Service. Nancy Lee's book records:

I asked Nicky, "Have you decided on anyone to help you in the session yet?" When I heard the chosen one was to be young Graham, I was surprised. "Oh, no, not Graham! [...] he's a nice boy, but he can't talk." Nick said, "Mum, leave him to me."

Nicky became a father-figure, personal friend and mentor to Kennedy, and the two built an extraordinary on-air rapport. Kennedy wrote:

Being straight man to one of the greatest entertainers of our time was not all that easy. We were not always chums. He would spend weeks not talking to me (except on air) for something I had unknowingly said or done. Once he even suspended me from the programme for some trivial matter. [...] I worked with him until his sudden death in 1956. I never stopped being a fan. I did not realise then that I had been prepared for another career on another electrical medium: the most potent communication device of the century.

Nicky died on 8 September 1956.

=== Other radio ===
By May 1957, Kennedy was appearing on television, but also presented a 3AK morning radio program with Bert Newton in 1961–1962, which later originated from a studio built at Kennedy's home in Olivers Hill, Frankston.

In 1970, he worked at 3XY; from June to December 1975 he appeared on a 3LO drivetime program with Richard Combe; from September to November 1976 was on 3DB with Dennis Scanlan; in 1977 he returned to DB to cover the Silver Jubilee of Elizabeth II live from London.

=== RS Playhouse ===
Kennedy recorded eight 30-minute radio comedies for the ABC under the title Graham Kennedy's RS Playhouse. Written by Gary Reilly and Tony Sattler (who together wrote the television programs Kingswood Country and The Naked Vicar Show), the shows were broadcast between 11 August and 23 September 1979.

Sattler and his wife (actress Noeline Brown) were two of Kennedy's closest friends.

=== 2Day FM ===
In 1980, Kennedy became a 10% shareholder in Sydney radio station 2Day FM, and from 24 May 1981 he presented a computer-edited, three-hour Sunday morning program of music and comedy.

== Television career ==
Kennedy's first television appearance was in March 1957, representing 3UZ on a GTV-9 Red Cross telethon. Viewing his performance on the monitors, GTV-9's general manager Colin Bednall and producer Norman Spencer "turned to one another without exchanging a word and shook hands."

=== In Melbourne Tonight ===
Bert Newton: "Hello, I'm Bert Newton."
Graham Kennedy: "Big deal."

Bednall and Spencer defied both the GTV-9 boardroom and the first sponsor (Philips) by choosing Kennedy, who began on a salary of £30 for five one-hour evening shows per week to be called In Melbourne Tonight (or IMT) which began on 6 May 1957 (A$213 per hour in 2022 terms). Thus, the 23-year-old Kennedy began a career of which he later said that he was "terrified for forty years". The show's theme song, "Gee, But You're Swell", was written by Abel Baer and Thomas Tobias in 1936.

Kennedy was not GTV-9's first choice – they had planned to use either 3UZ personality John McMahon or 3DB's Dick Cranbourne. Despite later reports that the program's name had been intended to be The Late Show, and that rival station HSV-7 beat GTV-9 to the title by one week, contemporary press reports from several weeks before the show's debut list the title as "In Melbourne Tonight". The program became extremely popular, although Kennedy had his detractors. Kennedy was quoted as saying:

Many women write to tell me that although their husbands may not like me, they do. It appears from the mail that the women have the say on what the household is watching. And we do remember that it is the women who do the buying of products that we advertise. Bearing that in mind we try and design our commercials for them.

IMT was devised as a copy of the American Tonight Show format, with the host presiding over sketches, introducing star artists and reading advertisements live. His colleague Bert Newton records in his autobiography:

(Norman) Spencer was the mastermind of IMT; don't let anyone forget that. Nothing happened on IMT that Norm did not approve personally [...] Norman Spencer chose Graham Kennedy as compère; Norm kept his eye on the show from day to day; he pushed the buttons from the control room which put the TV shots into viewers' homes at night; he added the talent around Graham and he set up the organisation.

Spencer wielded other influence, too. According to Hugh Stuckey, a writer on the show, the producer placed Kennedy with a series of attractive young women to displace rumours of Kennedy's homosexuality.

This was an era in which homosexuality was, well, horrifying. So every now and again Kennedy had to be seen about in case any viewers thought him the other persuasion. [...] It was cleverly manipulated – the station had the media at its disposal. It was all to give Graham a good old hetero image though he always seemed very unsexual.

By July 1959, the program was still popular in Melbourne. Recurring comedy players Joff Ellen and Rosie Sturgess became regulars. Singer Toni Lamond joined the cast. Attempts were made at this time to launch Kennedy as a national personality. Special Friday night editions of IMT were produced under the title of The Graham Kennedy Show and recorded on videotape which had just come into use. After being transmitted live in Melbourne taped copies of the show would be shipped to Adelaide, Brisbane and Sydney for transmission there on subsequent evenings. Producer Spencer observed there was critical and popular resistance to Kennedy in Sydney. Queensland too had shown suspicion to imports from down south trumpeted to Queenslanders as the best in Australia while Queensland itself had apparently been left out of this judgement.

The Graham Kennedy Show began in February 1960 but was not popular in Sydney. The program was judged stilted compared to IMT itself; Kennedy seemed much more subdued than usual, was tense, and the comedy was not working. Critics in Sydney and Queensland disliked key components of the show. Judged as a flop, The Graham Kennedy Show in Sydney was dropped by ATN7 after 13 weeks. The program however was immediately picked up by TCN9 – its general manager Ken G. Hall saw potential in the program. After continued bad reviews its popularity increased in Sydney. By July 1960 it had reached its twenty-fifth episode and had the highest ratings in Australia.

Later in 1960 Kennedy faced opposition when Sir Frank Packer bought GTV-9. Unlike the previous owner, Packer interfered directly with the station's activities. GTV-9 executive Colin Bednall reported that Packer hated Kennedy and forcefully articulated his desire to have him removed from the IMT.

Packer had a phobia about homosexuals and he believed Kennedy to be one. He insisted he could pick one a mile off.

Kennedy himself was aware that Packer "loathed" him:

Sir Frank did suspect that I and others were of that persuasion. I mean if everyone in the television industry was fired because of that, there would be few around! [...] I've been accused of everything. I've been accused of being homosexual, bisexual, heterosexual and worst of all asexual, which means you don't do anything. That's cruel.

Packer's arrival prompted the departure of IMT producer Norman Spencer. IMT continued its run. Other regular performers on IMT were Patti Newton and Philip Brady. In 1961, Kennedy described his presentation of the program.

In the whole of the ten years I have been working on radio and television, I have been working to a majority of women. I think women prefer men to be well-mannered, so I always try to watch my manners. They like men to be well dressed, so I do my best to observe this. Others bring to my notice the fact that I sometimes make grammatical errors in my speech; so, because of this, I try to watch my grammar – but at the same time I bear in mind that it's more profitable for me to be entertaining than to be perfect in my use of English.

By March 1961, the national show had been renamed Graham Kennedy's Channel 9 Show and was finding quiet acceptance nationally. Even at this time Kennedy admitted there were problems in the weekly national show.

We clam up and get tense. But I think the national show will improve in the next few weeks. We want to include the best segments of IMT in the national show. IMT is a lot more spontaneous than the national show – we've run up to an hour overtime. We like to get the audience to participate and if we can find someone interesting in the studio audience we throw away our scripts and just adlib.

Kennedy by this stage did not always host IMT. Bert Newton hosted on Monday nights. Then a September 1961 reshuffle had Toni Lamond host Monday nights and Newton hosted only on Thursday nights. Kennedy took occasional nights off to be replaced by Fred Parslow, Jimmy Hannan, and Philip Brady. Despite resistance from network executives to the varied hosting line-up, the ratings remained strong.

In January 1962 the national Graham Kennedy's Channel 9 Show was cancelled and replaced by The Channel 9 Show hosted by Bert Newton. Kennedy continued to fine-tune his IMT performances. Kennedy had a strong understanding of key technical elements of television and perfected his comic timing, and watched the lenses on the TV cameras, adjusting his performance depending on whether he was in a wide shot or a close up. Compilation highlight programs of IMT segments were screened in Sydney, Perth, Brisbane and Adelaide in May 1963 under the title The Best of Kennedy. The Best of Kennedy continued until December 1963. On IMT, Noel Ferrier was appointed the new Friday night host. Also in 1963 writer Mike McColl-Jones joined. Kennedy had often disliked having writers on the program, was reluctant for them to be publicly acknowledged, and often ignored all their material, preferring to rely on Tivoli shtick and sketches remembered by veterans like Joff Ellen. In the case of McColl-Jones, Kennedy seemed to like him and his comedy material, which was apparently the key requirement by which Kennedy would use a writer's material. McColl-Jones continued as a writer on the series for several years. Also in 1963 Ernie Carroll joined the writing team. Kennedy had apparently relaxed his attitude towards writers by this stage and seemed happy to use their material with few complaints.

In 1964 Bert Newton abruptly disappeared from the program. It was not publicly acknowledged at the time but he had suffered a nervous breakdown. After a long absence he returned to appear on the Monday, Tuesday and Wednesday evening episodes. On 14 June 1965 IMT reached its 2,000th instalment and more people watched the show per capita than any other television program in the world.

By this stage Fred Parslow was well established on the program's writing team and was a confidante of Kennedy's.

When he was really down, depressed about things. A relationship had failed. He rang me in a terrible state and asked me to go down to his house in Frankston. Joan, my wife, said you better go. He sounded really desperate. There wasn't much he could do for such a long time. Of course, when he did start to get brave, he was too old for going around and picking up what he might enjoy. He was the first of our mega stars; there seem to be mega stars everywhere now. In those days, living in such a Sleepy Hollow like Melbourne, he found his life terribly, terribly difficult. And you can understand in those days. The times have changed. It's almost compulsory to be homosexual now.

On 7 July 1965, Kennedy appeared on a then-innovative live split-screen link with Don Lane, the host of Sydney Tonight, via the recently completed co-axial cable linking Melbourne and Sydney. Starting late September 1966, IMT itself was transmitted to Sydney via the coaxial cable. This coincided with a cameo in the film They're a Weird Mob in which Kennedy plays himself. Like the film's protagonist, Kennedy in the film finds Sydney to be a city somewhat unwelcoming towards migrants from anywhere. By early December 1966 ratings for Kennedy's show were strong in Sydney. There was an increase from one IMT episode a week in Sydney, to two, with a Monday night broadcast added that month.

By 1968, there was a regular roster of IMT guest hosts, including Bert Newton, Tim Evans, Bobby Limb, Don Lane, Kevin Sanders, and Michael Preston. The announcement of Kennedy's intention to leave IMT was made in October 1969 and he left the show on the expiration of his contract 23 December 1969. His final episode features newsreader Sir Eric Pearce placing on his head a crown made by the Channel Nine prop department in the style of that worn by Henry IV, symbolising Kennedy's reign as King of Australian television.

In 2007, the crown (which a private collector had recognised at a junk store in Bowral NSW, and purchased for $5) was auctioned for more than $17,000 to a producer of the Seven Network's Sunrise program.

=== The Graham Kennedy Show ===
After specials on 15 November 1971 and 2 March 1972, Kennedy returned to regular television with The Graham Kennedy Show on 19 September 1972. This series lasted until late 1973. In 1974, when Kennedy claimed he wanted a rest, Nine allegedly paid him not to sign with another network. It was Frank Packer who paid Kennedy $50,000 to do nothing, as he was fearful he would work for someone else. Kennedy said in 1978:

It wasn't a retainer. It was $50,000 not to work. Sir Frank didn't know it but I had no intention of working.

The Graham Kennedy Show resumed in March 1975, and was Kennedy's first series in colour.

Memorable, and controversial, moments, included the "crow call" controversy where, on 3 March 1975, Kennedy imitated a crow call ("faaaaaark") highly reminiscent of the word "fuck". This led the Australian Broadcasting Control Board (ABCB) to request that Kennedy "show cause" why he should not be removed from the airwaves. Kennedy replied that he could not show cause, suggesting that the Board take action to limit his appearances, while hinting at legal action should they do so. Rather than removing him, the ABCB banned Kennedy from appearing live, forcing him to pre-record the show on videotape.

Another notable moment was from 17 April 1975, when Kennedy attacked Senator Doug McClelland, the then Minister for the Media, over local content issues. His comments were edited, and a voiceover recorded by the general manager was inserted saying that Kennedy had made a "cowardly attack on a Labor Minister who was unable to defend himself."

Following the McClelland incident, Kennedy parted company with the Nine Network, but later returned.

=== Later television work ===
Kennedy appeared as Clive Parker in an episode of the 26-part ABC drama Power Without Glory, which began on 21 June 1976.

He returned to television in 1977 for what is now Network Ten to host a comedy game show, Blankety Blanks. It dominated early evening television over two seasons, between 7 February 1977 and 15 September 1978. The show featured friends from his earlier days including Noeline Brown, Barry Creyton, Noel Ferrier, Ugly Dave Gray, Carol Raye and Stuart Wagstaff. It was only after the show became a ratings success and the network's most profitable program that it revealed Kennedy was paid an unprecedented $1 million per season.

In 1979, "The King" became King of Moomba complete with his motorised desk, the second Melbourne-born recipient after Newton.

In 1982 Kennedy provided the voice-over narration for a ten-episode ABC historical documentary The Blainey View.

Kennedy appeared as the host of Channel Seven's morning news program Eleven AM in 1983 and again – for eight weeks – in 1984. Nearly 60 by this point, Kennedy accepted an offer from the Nine Network's managing director Sam Chisholm to present Graham Kennedy's News Show from Sydney, to air five nights a week at 10:30 pm against Clive Robertson's Newsworld on the Seven Network. Five trial programs were recorded but never broadcast.

Kennedy initially "pulled the plug" and withdrew from the show but returned (see Harry M. Miller, below). Kennedy's contract stipulated that his co-presenter would be sports commentator Ken Sutcliffe.

Kennedy's writers, who worked from a production cottage at the corner of Scott Street and Artarmon Road included Jim Pike, Tim Evans, Larry Burns, and Ken Sterling. Blundell records:

They worked in the back room shooting out gags over typewriters and word processors, united in their hatred of the 'Little Guy', as they also called him."

The writers also referred to Kennedy as "the little buggle-eyed bastard",. However, they admired his talent. Jim Pike said, ".. I hate him, but he is the best there is".

Kennedy defied convention with his tasteless humour. Pointing out the irony of how a news show gets good ratings he said it would be helpful for his show's ratings if the Pope's aircraft were to fly into a mountain while it was full of orphans. He also remarked that Queen Elizabeth II "didn't have bad breasts ... for a woman of her age" and mocked 17 October 1989, San Francisco Loma Prieta earthquake with a re-creation on the set.

After a slightly heavy woman was caught for streaking at a cricket match, Graham explained on air that they would run the footage but had to cover certain offending parts of her body with black. The clip he played was all black, except for a single spot that revealed her pubic hair.

He also reprised the "Chum Song" from Melbourne radio days, saying that it originated in a 1920s children's newspaper column in Scotland. In Nancy Lee's book Being a Chum Was Fun she writes:

The Chum Song, I believe, was written and recorded in Glasgow in 1930 by Jack Hylton's orchestra for a Scottish Newsboys Club. The recording Kennedy used to close the program was provided by Melbourne music Historian Alex Hehr

The lyrics of the chorus are:

Being a chum is fun,
That is why I'm one;
Always smiling, always gay,
Chummy at work,
(and) chummy at play -
Laugh away your worries,
Don't be sad or glum;
And everyone will know that you're a
Chum, chum, chum!

Sutcliffe would "corpse", with tears in his eyes, unable to continue; this became so frequent that Kennedy managed to coin a catchphrase, "I love it when he cries".

Kennedy called Sutcliffe "Two Dogs" after delivering a joke ending with the tag "Why do you ask, Two Dogs Rooting?"

Graham Kennedy's News Show was a rarity in that it was a live news show that had a studio audience. Five nights a week for most of the year, audiences lined up at 10:30 at night just to see Kennedy do his magic in the flesh. Often the funniest parts of the show were in the commercial breaks when Kennedy would come down and join the audience for a chat. He always made a point of telling them a particularly crude joke that was timed so they got the punchline just a second before the show was back on air. On 13 February 1989 the show became Coast to Coast, with Nine journalist John Mangos replacing Sutcliffe, and ran until 8 December 1989. Kennedy's last series was Graham Kennedy's Funniest Home Video Show which was broadcast between 29 March and 15 November 1990 on the Nine Network. Kennedy presented the introduction segment to the Nine Network special 35 Years of Television in 1991. The segment covered the very early days of television variety, including his own In Melbourne Tonight. Kennedy's last television appearance was in February 1994 in an interview for Ray Martin Presents Graham Kennedy's Sixtieth. Believing that Martin had ambushed him by departing from a pre-agreed list of questions, Kennedy ensured that much of the interview was unusable for broadcast by peppering his responses with obscenities.

In 2005 John Mangos wrote:

He (Kennedy) later explained the experience in a piece for TV Week in an article called 'In his own words'.

"Ray Martin and I had worked together before, and he well knows that if I have the questions in advance, he'll get a better interview. Everyone knows this – politicians in particular. Ray duly faxed the questions to me, but on the morning of the recording changed them. I was bewildered by this (I think a researcher let him down). I terminated the interview when I didn't know what he was talking about and went upstairs to lunch."

It was a critical turning point in his career. He vowed never to do television again.

Ray Martin denied any ill intent, saying "We faxed a series of general topics, but it was clear at the outset that much would depend on the general run of the interview [...] An ambush was not on the agenda [...] He had no complaints. There was never a suggestion that he was unhappy."

=== Logie awards ===
Kennedy coined the name Logie Award in 1960, after the inventor of television, John Logie Baird.

Kennedy received many Logies, including:

- 5 Gold Logies for the Most Popular Personality on Australian Television (1960, 1967, 1969, 1974, and 1978).
  - He also won the "TV Week Awards' Star of the Year" award at the inaugural presentation in 1959, and this is sometimes counted as his first Gold Logie, which would give him 6 in total
- a Special Logie Award – the Star of the Decade in 1967
- a Hall of Fame Logie Award in 1998. He did not attend the ceremony; the award was accepted on his behalf by Bert Newton.

== Filmography ==
=== Film ===
Year	Title	Role	Type
1959	On the Beach	Cameo (uncredited) - cut from final film	Feature film
1966	They're a Weird Mob	Himself (cameo)	Feature film
1968	The World of the Seekers	Himself	TV movie
1975	The Box	Himself	Feature film
1976	Don's Party	Mack, design engineer	Feature film
1979	The Odd Angry Shot	Harry	Feature film
1980	We'll Be Back After This Break	Himself	TV movie
1980	The Club	Ted Parker	Feature film
1983	The Return of Captain Invincible	Prime Minister (cameo)	Feature film
1984	The Killing Fields	Dougal	Feature film
1984	Stanley	Norm Norris	Feature film
1987	Les Patterson Saves the World	Brian Lannigan	Feature film
1987	Travelling North	Freddy (final film role)	Feature film

=== Television ===
Year	Title	Role	Type
1957	GTV-9 Red Cross telethon	3UZ representative	TV special
1957-69	In Melbourne Tonight (IMT)	Host	TV variety series, 87 episodes
1959	The Bob Dyer Show	Himself	TV special
1959	BP Super Show	Himself	TV series
1959	Adelaide Tonight	Himself	TV series
1960	The General Motors Hour	Himself	TV series, 1 episode
1961-62	Graham Kennedy's Channel 9 Show	Host	TV variety series
1963	The Best of Kennedy		TV highlights series
1965	In Perth Tonight	Himself	TV series
1972	ALP: It's Time	Himself	TV political campaign
1972-75	The Graham Kennedy Show	Host	TV variety series, 115 episodes
1975	Celebrity Squares	Himself	TV game series, 11 episodes
1976	Power Without Glory	Clive Parker	TV series, 1 episode
1976-83	The Don Lane Show	Himself	TV series, 2 episodes
1977-78	Blankety Blanks	Host	TV game series, 27 episodes
1980	Kingswood Country	Himself	TV series, the royal visit
1980	Celebrity Tattle Tales	Himsf	TV series, 2 episodes
1980	Cabaret	Himself	TV series
1981	The Love Boat	Port Vila Jeweller	TV series, 2 episodes
1982	The Blainey View	Narrator	TV documentary series, 10 episodes
1983	Silent Reach	Chasser Fitzpatrick	TV miniseries, 2 episodes
1983-84	Eleven AM	Host	TV series
1984	Five Mile Creek	Walker the Hawker	TV series, 1 episode
1988-89	Graham Kennedy's News Show	Host	TV series
1989	Coast to Coast		TV series
1989	Channel Seven Perth Telethon	Himself	TV special, 1 episode
1990	Graham Kennedy's Funniest Home Video Show	Host	TV series, 1 episode
1991	35 Years of Television	Presenter (introduction segment)	TV specials
1994	Ray Martin Presents Graham Kennedy's Sixtieth	Interviewee	TV special

== Personal life ==
Being a period of that era of the 1950s I think being gay must have been pretty harsh for Graham. I can imagine...everybody knew, nobody cared, but I think it was such a time when you didn't talk about issues that were personal, and I think that made him much more secretive and reclusive, and I think that was probably quite a tough thing for him... – Susan Gaye Anderson

Kennedy himself never publicly acknowledged that he was gay, but his homosexuality was considered an open secret within the Australian entertainment industry.

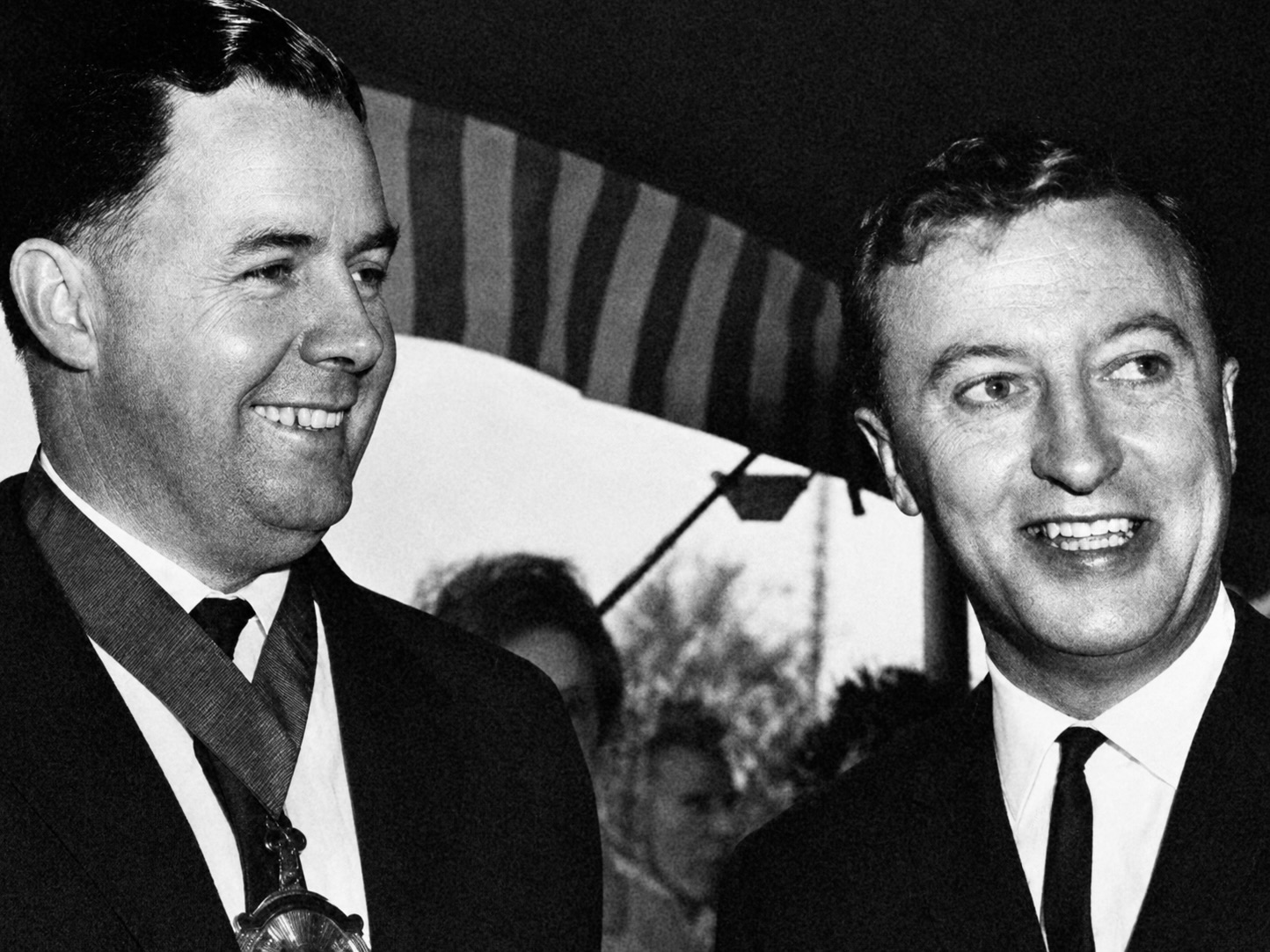
Kennedy (right) with Nunawading Mayor Owen Goldsborough at the opening of the Forest Hills Shopping Centre, 1964

In the 1960s, Bob Dyer described him as "probably the loneliest young man in Australia."

In 1973, Melbourne newspapers reported that Kennedy was engaged to 28-year-old Australian singer Lana Cantrell, who became a successful New York lawyer. Many years later, Kennedy wrote to a newspaper that a photographer, taking pictures of him and Cantrell leaving a restaurant together, asked if he could "hint at a romance". The following Sunday, a poster proclaimed "Graham and Lana to wed". His former housekeeper, Devona Fox, in the 2009 television documentary The Real Graham Kennedy—produced by Bob Phillips, one of the producers from Kennedy's breakthrough Channel 9 program In Melbourne Tonight—is quoted as saying:

Graham always told me right early on that he would never get married. He told me that his life was devastated when his parents split up, and he said straight out, "Mrs Fox, I'll never get married", so I never expected anything more of him than what did happen. Even when Lana Cantrell came into the scene I was puzzled and I did say to him why all this, and of course we all know it was good publicity. Lana came to the house and I had to go up, and have it all cleaned, ready for her and her party to come one Sunday night. And then on the Monday night, this great big announcement was going to be made that he was supposed to be engaged to Lana Cantrell. Well, the ratings went through the roof...

In his 2006 book King and I: My Life with Graham Kennedy, published by celebrity agent Anthony Zammit, broadcaster Rob Astbury stated that Kennedy and he had been lovers. Kennedy is portrayed as homosexual in the 2007 biopic The King.

He was a Freemason.

=== Lawsuit ===
Kennedy engaged Harry M. Miller as his agent. According to biographer Blundell, Kennedy believed that Miller was to donate his commission of $2500 per week to the Wayside Chapel for Kennedy's appearance on Graham Kennedy's News Show.

Miller later sued Kennedy for "wrongful termination and for a 20 per cent commission on his 1989 gross earnings." During the court case, Miller "painted a picture of his client of twenty years as a late-night drunk in the habit of sending demanding faxes while under the influence." Justice Brownie found against Miller, and ordered him to pay $75,699 and costs.

=== Retirement ===
In 1991, Kennedy retired to a rural property at Canyonleigh, near Bowral in the Southern Highlands of New South Wales, near his friends Tony Sattler and Noeline Brown, where his main companions were two Clydesdale horses named Dave and Sarah, and Henry, a Golden Retriever.

=== Health problems ===
Kennedy's health declined during the 1990s. He was diabetic, and a heavy smoker and drinker. Throughout his illnesses, his friends Tony Sattler and Noeline Brown rallied to his aid.

On 18 December 2001 his housekeeper found him unconscious and dehydrated. Sattler said "Between the diabetes and the booze, there's not much left of him", adding that the death of Kennedy's dog Henry was "the final trigger".

On 14 June 2002 Kennedy was found unconscious at the foot of the stairs at his home, suffering a broken leg and skull with suspected brain damage.

His Canyonleigh property was sold, and he moved into a townhouse and later a nursing home.

==== Benefactor ====
Despite a career of high earnings, press reports said that his financial situation was, while not disastrous, insufficient to fund his ongoing care. Having made millions for the Packer family interests, he believed that "the Packers will always look after me".

According to Graeme Blundell's biography, Tony Sattler:

[...]spent several days ringing Kerry Packer's office [...] Nursing was going to cost $3000 a week. 'We could cope for several years but not longer. [...] After three days Di Stone, Mr Packer's personal assistant, called Sattler back: 'Mr Packer has considered his plight. Unfortunately, he is unable to assist.

[...] Sattler received a phone call from [...] an 'unnamed businessman' – [...] ten minutes later there was a call from Graham's bank to tell Sattler that $150,000 had been deposited in the ailing comedian's account.

On 27 May 2005, Noeline Brown confirmed that the benefactor was Sam Chisholm.

However, Kennedy's will reportedly left a seven-figure sum to the Sydney City Mission.

=== Decline and death ===
On 2 February 2004, The Daily Telegraph said:

The king of Australian TV Graham Kennedy will celebrate his 70th birthday next weekend with a few close friends. The low-key affair is expected to be at the Kenilworth Nursing Home at Bowral where Kennedy has lived since taking a nasty tumble a few years ago. Physically he's not in terrific shape. He can't walk any more and gets around in a wheelchair as a result of the diabetes and the years of heavy smoking.

Actor Graeme Blundell, who had worked with Kennedy on the movie The Odd Angry Shot, published a biography of Kennedy, King: The Life and Comedy of Graham Kennedy (MacMillan, 2003). A newspaper report stated that Kennedy "passed on his best wishes but declined to be involved 'for no particular reason [...] other than he believes he has a limited memory of many of the facts of his life'." The book, which was completed before Kennedy's death, ends with "Graham read them [chapters of an early draft] ... asked if he wished to read any more, 'No', Graham Kennedy said. 'I know how it ends.'"

In 2001, Kennedy's friend and Coast to Coast colleague John Mangos was reported as saying:

I can say to his beloved fans that they won't see Graham again. He won't appear publicly again; he is in his twilight. He has made a personal decision to disappear quietly into the sunset.

On 25 May 2005, aged 71, Kennedy died at the Kenilworth Nursing Home, Bowral, from complications from pneumonia.

John Mangos wrote in The Bulletin:

A week before his 69th birthday, he was bedridden and infirm. His wasted and frail, aching body could take no more. I paid a short and emotional visit. Still, the ashtray was by his bedside next to a radio tuned to ABC Radio National. I leaned over to kiss him on the forehead and he whispered, "Don't get too close, it hurts".

He also wrote:

I was often asked if he had cancer or AIDS. In fact at 67, he had diabetes, some rheumatism, the odd creaky joint, a healthy capacity to whinge and the usual symptoms connected with smoking and drinking. But by now the horses were gone and the dog had died. He was eating less and drinking more. One night, he fell down the stairs. He was discovered the next morning on the floor by his housekeeper. He was rushed to the local hospital where pneumonia in one lung was treated effectively and efficiently, a fracture near his hip was repaired and he was diagnosed with brain damage. We were to learn he had Korsakoff's syndrome (an alcohol-related condition) and we decided to keep it private.

Korsakoff's syndrome is a form of amnesia seen in chronic alcoholics; briefly stated, victims eat too little and drink too much.

=== Derryn Hinch controversy ===
After his death, controversial Melbourne-based 3AW radio broadcaster Derryn Hinch alleged that Kennedy had died from an AIDS-related disease. This was strenuously denied by his friends and carers Noeline Brown and Tony Sattler, and as a result Kennedy's biographer Graeme Blundell then published Kennedy's medical records, including a recent negative HIV test, to disprove this allegation.

=== Funeral ===
Tony Sattler offered the Nine Network the right to televise the funeral but it declined, claiming it could not justify the cost of the outside broadcast. The Seven Network accepted, and gave coverage free of charge to the Nine Network. Hence, the one-hour funeral service was aired simultaneously across both Seven and Nine networks.

Stuart Wagstaff presented the funeral, which was attended by many of Kennedy's friends, colleagues and associates on the morning of 31 May 2005 at a small community theatre in the town of Mittagong. At the end of the funeral Kennedy's coffin was carried by players from the St Kilda Football Club, the Australian rules football team he supported.

Wagstaff's eulogy alluded to the claims made by Derryn Hinch about the cause of Kennedy's death:

Delivering a eulogy for a close friend and for someone who was so much admired is never a happy occasion. Though I must confess I would be quite happy to deliver a eulogy for a certain media personality who's tried the second Kennedy assassination of our time... and failed.

The Age newspaper, on 26 June 2005, reported John Mangos as saying that he "knew Kennedy wanted his ashes scattered at sea. And that wish was carried out." This was confirmed in a report in The Sydney Morning Herald which stated that Kennedy's ashes were scattered in the sea at Kiama attended by a group which included "Noeline Brown, Tony Sattler, John Mangos, Stuart Wagstaff, Kennedy's former housekeeper Sally Baker-Beall and her husband John, and old friends Christine and Nicholas Deeprose."

== Legacy ==
Four of Kennedy's television shows were named in the program 50 Years 50 Shows which counted down the top 50 Australian TV shows of all time, as decided by ratings data and the opinions of 100 television industry professionals, on the Nine Network on 25 September 2005. Kennedy's In Melbourne Tonight topped the poll, Power Without Glory was 15th, Blankety Blanks was 20th, and Coast to Coast was 42nd.

In the Australia Day honours of 26 January 2006, Kennedy was posthumously appointed an Officer of the Order of Australia (AO), for "service to the entertainment industry as an actor, comedian and presenter significantly influencing the development of the radio, television and film industries in Australia, and to the community". The award was made effective from 5 May 2005.

=== The King telemovie ===
A telemovie examining Kennedy's life, titled The King, began filming in December 2006. It stars Stephen Curry as Kennedy and Stephen Hall as Bert Newton, with Garry McDonald, Shaun Micallef, Steve Bisley, Jane Allsop as Noeline Brown, Beau Brady, Leo Taylor as Sir Frank Packer and Bernard Curry as John Wesley.

The project, which cost $2.1 million, premiered on 20 May 2007 on TV1 (becoming the highest-rating drama to be shown on pay-TV) to heavy criticism by Kennedy's friends. Tony Sattler and his wife, actress Noeline Brown, Kennedy's closest friends, said they were mortified by the movie, saying that "The film was obsessed with his homosexuality. I don't think people cared about that ... He was Australia's most famous, successful entertainer but how much do we see of that in the film? We see fuck all of it." The Nine Network screened the film on 27 August 2007 .

== Comedic style ==
Kennedy deliberately pushed the boundaries of acceptability in a socially conservative era. Inspired by stage comedians such as Roy Rene, his style was bawdy, irreverent, iconoclastic, often smutty, sometimes deliberately camp, and laden with innuendo and double-entendre. He regularly overstepped the boundaries of accepted "good taste", once telling a fan "There are no limits, love, there are no limits."

Journalist Megan Gressor described Kennedy's style as having "mongrel roots – a hybrid of vaudeville, slapstick and endless suggestiveness, plus a subliminal subversiveness all his own. It seems almost pantomimic to modern eyes, but Kennedy was a product of simpler times. And more complex. His was an act predicated upon repression; naughtiness loses its point in a world without taboos, where anything goes. It wouldn't work today, when people don't just say "fuck" on television, they do it."
