= Wake in Fright (miniseries) =

2017 television miniseries

- Australian promotional poster
- Genre: Psychological thriller, crime
- Based on: Wake in Fright by Kenneth Cook
- Written by: Stephen M. Irwin
- Directed by: Kriv Stenders
- Starring: Sean Keenan; Alex Dimitriades; Caren Pistorius; Gary Sweet; Robyn Malcolm; Anna Samson; Lee Jones; Jada Alberts; David Wenham
- Composers: Antony Partos; Matteo Zingales
- Country of origin: Australia
- Original language: English
- No. of episodes: 2

Production
- Executive producers: Helen Bowden; Jason Stephens; Mark Fennessy; Carl Fennessy; Rick Maier
- Producers: Helen Bowden; Kristian Moliere
- Production locations: Broken Hill; Sydney
- Cinematography: Geoffrey Hall
- Editor: Deborah Peart
- Running time: 79 minutes (Part One); 81 minutes (Part Two)
- Production companies: Lingo Pictures; Endemol Shine Australia; Triptych Pictures

Original release
- Network: Network 10
- Release: 8 October – 15 October 2017

Wake in Fright is an Australian miniseries based on Kenneth Cook's 1961 novel of the same name, which first aired on Network Ten in October 2017. Directed by Kriv Stenders and written by Stephen M. Irwin, the series features an ensemble cast that includes Sean Keenan, Alex Dimitriades, Caren Pistorius, David Wenham, Anna Samson, Gary Sweet, and Robyn Malcolm.

It is the second filmed adaptation of Cook's novel, following Ted Kotcheff's 1971 film version. As with earlier versions of the story, the series depicts the psychological journey of John Grant, a schoolteacher who has been marooned in an isolated outback town. Although it occasionally makes closer references to the novel than the film, the overall story was largely reworked for the series to fit a contemporary setting.

== Plot ==
=== Part One ===
John Grant is a young schoolteacher stationed in Tiboonda, an isolated "dry-town" in the outback. After finishing the school year in time for the Christmas holidays, he begins driving to Sydney, apparently expecting to take up a new teaching position in Neutral Bay, as well as to marry his girlfriend, Robyn. John's hits a kangaroo on the road, forcing a stopover while waiting for his car to be repaired, in the mining town of Bundayabba – referred to by the locals as "The Yabba". At a pub, he meets the enigmatic Sergeant Jock Crawford, who introduces him to the game of two-up, which is illegal but tolerated. After an early winning streak, John continues betting until he loses all of his money. Including some borrowed from former MMA fighter Mick Jaffries, and her brother Joe, who subsequently demand that he pay them back.

John befriends real estate agent Tim Hynes, who invites him to have dinner with his family, including his wife Ursula and daughter Janette, the town nurse. The encounter is shaken by the arrival of Evan "Doc" Tydon, the disgraced town doctor; Doc and Janette begin to interrogate secrets in John's character, which culminates in Janette attempting to seduce him. Afterwards, Tim tries to sell a house to John, hoping to generate cash in the wake of the decline in the mining business on which The Yabba was built; when John instead asks for a loan to pay off his debts, Tim throws him out.

John awakens in Doc's ramshackle caravan. In his recollections of the previous night, he believes that Doc initiated a drunken homosexual encounter between them. Doc seemingly betrays John to Mick and Joe, who take them to their car-wrecking yard and prepare to embark on a feral pig hunt, giving John a chance to pay off his debts. Before departing, the Jaffries discover that John has found their secret drug laboratory, causing John to suspect that they intend to kill him during the hunt.

=== Part Two ===
The pig hunt turns into a riotous expedition fuelled by drugs and alcohol. Eventually, John falls unconscious and awakens to discover that Doc has been shot dead. Recalling earlier tensions between Doc and Mick, he assumes that the siblings killed Doc to set him up. After fleeing the scene, John encounters Crawford and tells him what has happened, but they discover that the corpse has vanished. Crawford takes him to a hotel for questioning, but when Mick and Joe arrive, he escapes and takes refuge with Janette. After discovering that Doc and Janette were lovers and had a daughter, John explains that Doc has been killed; enraged, Janette blames him for the murder and turns him away. Believing the police and the Jaffries are conspiring to set him up, he avoids Sergeant Crawford and hitches a ride to a nearby truck stop.

John persuades a driver, who he assumes is heading for Sydney, to take him to the city, offering his only possession – an engagement ring intended for Robyn – as payment. Due to a misunderstanding, he returns to The Yabba and is immediately confronted by Sergeant Crawford, who shows him video taken by the Jaffries indicating that he shot Doc while hallucinating. In flashbacks, it is revealed that Robyn had rejected his earlier marriage proposal. Resulting in a dejected John getting drunk, hopelessly unable save her from drowning;. This was the real reason for John to isolate himself, from alcohol and society, by teaching in remote Tiboonda. Overwhelmed by the two deaths on his conscience, John takes a rifle, and shoots himself in the head, disfiguring but not killing him.

Awakening in hospital, Crawford has John sign a statement stating the suicide attempt was just an accident. He also reveals that the Jaffries have been ordered to leave The Yabba due to their drug operations, and that Doc's fate has been ruled as death by misadventure. Janette explains that their daughter drowned when Doc was supposed to be looking after her, leaving him also wracked with guilt. Flashbacks reveal that Doc did not take advantage of John, but instead ensured his safety during his stupor, composed a suicide note, and willingly stepped in the path of his rifle. Following Janette's advice, John is inspired by his experiences, and returns to Tiboonda to start the new school year with renewed hope.

== Cast ==
Principal cast

- Sean Keenan as John Grant
- Alex Dimitriades as Evan "Doc" Tydon
- Caren Pistorius as Janette Hynes
- David Wenham as Sergeant Jock Crawford
- Gary Sweet as Tim Hynes
- Robyn Malcolm as Ursula Hynes
- Anna Samson as Michaela "Mick" Jaffries
- Lee Jones as Joe Jaffries
- Jada Alberts as Constable Sandy Fanshawe

Supporting cast

- Di Adams as Joyce, barmaid
- Fayssal Bazzi as Donald, hotel receptionist
- Elissa Burke as Maisy, schoolgirl
- Randall Dart as Vic Killen, mechanic
- Alan Dukes as Wayne Leneham
- Hannah Fredericksen as Robyn Leneham
- Gregory J. Fryer as Thomas, Aboriginal driver
- Sonya Giesekam as Mrs. Leneham
- Jason Lee Hansen as Charlie, Tiboonda publican
- John MacLeod as Elderly Man, a figure in John's hallucinations
- Paula Nazarski as Bea, cab driver
- Jerome Pride as Small Driver
- Darcey Wilson (uncredited) as Jackie Killen

== Production ==
=== Development and pre-production ===
In 2012, Triptych Pictures producer Kristian Moliere and Helen Bowden of Matchbox Pictures approached the family of writer Kenneth Cook on the possibility of a televised adaptation of his 1961 novel Wake in Fright. Although the response was enthusiastic, the pair was informed that they would only be allowed to begin production once they had found the option for the original 1971 film version - if the deal stated that the adaptation rights were owned by a single entity in perpetuity, Moliere and Bowden would not be allowed to proceed with a series. The search for the option took three years, and eventually resulted in a copy being uncovered at the Estate of Dirk Bogarde (who had originally planned to produce an adaptation in 1963) in Paris, which indicated that the option only referred to a film version, allowing Moliere and Bowden - who had left Matchbox and co-founded Lingo Pictures with Jason Stephens of FremantleMedia Australia - to enter active development by the end of 2015. By this time, Lingo Pictures had also entered a co-production deal for two series with Mark and Carl Fennessy of Endemol Shine Australia, and Wake in Fright was decided as the first of those two productions. Both would also receive international distribution through Endemol Shine International. The series was officially announced on 6 September 2016, with Kriv Stenders being revealed as director.

Commenting on the relatively short period from development to principal photography (roughly fourteen months), Bowden explained that screenwriter Stephen M. Irwin - who was hired in January 2016 - and Network Ten's head of drama Rick Maier were "very fast and very good with feedback". Although noting that Wake in Fright was primarily targeted at a contemporary Australian audience, she expressed confidence in the series finding success abroad, saying "It's got a franchise, so it's known through the novel, which has never been out of print in 50 years and it's known through the film, which is very famous and not long ago the restored version was distributed through the US and a number of European countries. And [Endemol Shine CEO Cathy Payne] thinks the Outback setting and the story and the structure are ideal for international sales which is great. That's what Lingo is about". During production, Moliere explained that the series primarily draws inspiration from the novel instead of the film, which he described as "giving [the production team] a new way of looking at the casting". Speaking on the role of retelling the story, Stenders said:

Every generation, I think, needs to be reminded of [...] the fantastic, rich culture that they have to draw from. So, to me, these - whatever you want to call them - "remakes" or "reimaginings" are, I think, a fantastic sign that we have [...] this property that is worth something, and I think that's incredibly exciting and incredibly positive.

Aside from transposing the story to the present day, a number of changes to the material were made in Irwin's script, notably the adaptation of the kangaroo hunt from the novel and film (which controversially featured footage of real kangaroos being shot) to a hunt for feral pigs. Although this was partially due to practical and ethical reasons regarding animal cruelty, Stenders felt that such a change "just seemed to make perfect sense. The feral pig problem in Australia has become a devastating one that is seriously affecting rural communities, and the pig shoot provided us with the perfect setting and context for our version of the sequence". Ironically, Evan Jones' script for the original film had also adapted the kangaroo hunt as a pig hunt, but this was changed back to the former during filming.

Ted Kotcheff, the director of the 1971 film, initially expressed surprise that another adaptation of Cook's novel was being made, questioning "What are they going to do, use the book and make a serial? Is there something missing from the film?" Following this comment, Kotcheff asked to give Stenders his "congratulations and best wishes".

Helen Bowden, Jason Stephens, Mark Fennessy, Carl Fennessy, and Rick Maier served as executive producers.

=== Casting ===
On 4 March 2017, the lead cast of Wake in Fright - Sean Keenan, David Wenham, Alex Dimitriades, Gary Sweet, Caren Pistorius, Robyn Malcolm, Lee Jones, Anna Samson, Hannah Frederiksen and Jada Alberts - was announced. Many of the smaller supporting roles and extras were portrayed by locals with no professional acting experience.

Keenan revealed that he was offered the part of John Grant while shooting another project; after being introduced to the film by a prop master who had found it on DVD in a charity shop, he studied both the novel and film, particularly the former, to get an understanding of his character. Wenham admitted that he expressed scepticism when he was offered the role of Jock Crawford, calling the reimagining "a stupid idea". He changed his mind and accepted the role after expressing satisfaction with the script, adding that "Very few people after my generation will ever see that film. That's what made me turn 180 degrees. I thought, 'Why not give people the opportunity to access this story? Why am I being so snooty about it?'"

=== Filming ===
Principal photography for Wake in Fright took place in Broken Hill and Sydney. Beginning on 5 March 2017, the shoot lasted five weeks.

== Reception ==
=== Promotion ===
Network Ten released the first trailer for Wake in Fright on 25 July 2017, followed by a second on 17 September. The second trailer was recalled by Ten following a complaint made by the law firm Lea-Shannon Legal on behalf of the Wake in Fright Trust, which owns the rights to the 1971 film, due to its misleading use of a quote by Martin Scorsese regarding his reaction to the original 1971 film's screening at the Cannes Film Festival ("It left me speechless") to describe the 2017 series. Later airings of the trailer replaced Scorsese's comment with a quote from The Age, which described the series as "A stunning Australian drama".

=== Viewership ===
Upon the broadcast of the first episode, The Daily Telegraph reported that the series had "bombed on debut" despite heavy promotion by Network Ten. The writer felt that its 408,000 viewership ratings put in doubt "the future of Aussie drama on commercial networks after disappointing figures from similar biopics and remakes (including Blue Murder: Killer Cop, House of Bond and Hoges: The Paul Hogan Story) throughout the year".

No.	Title	Air date	Timeslot	Overnight ratings		Consolidated ratings		Total viewers	Ref(s)
No.	Title	Air date	Timeslot	Viewers	Rank	Viewers	Rank	Total viewers	Ref(s)
1	Part One	8 October 2017	Sunday 8:30pm	408,000	19	51,000	15	459,000	
2	Part Two	15 October 2017	Sunday 8:30pm	293,000	13	75,000	12	368,000	

=== Critical response ===
Since its broadcast, critical responses to the 2017 miniseries Wake in Fright have varied, with reviewers typically lauding members of the cast (particularly Keenan, Dimitriades and Wenham) for their performances, while the story adaptation and technical elements of the production were either praised for creating a strong sense of fear and intensity, or criticised for being overwrought, unnecessary or inferior to the novel and 1971 film.

Writing for The Australian, Graeme Blundell's assessment of the series was highly positive, asserting that Irwin and Stenders' adaptation successfully retained Cook's vision of the outback and mateship. He believed that this was in large part due to the "polish[ed] and control[led]" direction of the cast and "the mise-en-scene [which] has you longing for a beer after only minutes". Blundell also felt that the series stayed true to the producers' intentions of "imagin[ing] a new story from a contemporary perspective" while not "[treading] on the footprint of the 1971 film". A similarly enthusiastic response came from Denise Erikson of The New Daily, who expressed that she was tempted to "call this the best new Australian drama this year", describing Wake in Fright as "beautifully cast, well scripted, imaginatively shot and very well directed. A terrific music score drives the tension [...] a sparse script allow[s] the story to star and grip the audience". Erikson felt that audiences unfamiliar with previous versions would not be hindered by the experience of watching the newer adaptation, "because you won't waste time wondering which one is best. This first episode at least is simply excellent television drama in its own right".

Karl Quinn of The Sydney Morning Herald was also favourable. The writer believed that the series was a "rather terrific production" that captured the spirit of the novel and the "snowballing chaos all this drunkenness begets" well, singling out Wenham, Sweet and Dimitriades for praise; while admitting that he was uncertain about the new treatment of Doc Tydon's character, he said that he could "understand why it was done". Reviewing for Now To Love, Thomas Mitchell lauded Keenan's performance, and noted that "While the two-part series will inevitably be compared to the film, they’re different beasts. But one thing they do share is that both will have you glued to the edge of your seat".

More mixed responses came from Ben Neutze of Daily Review and David Knox of TV Tonight, both of whom reviewed the first episode only. While praising Stenders' direction and the cast, particularly Keenan and Samson, Neutze felt that the chosen medium of commercial television and the need for advertising breaks throughout severely hampered the story's pacing, resulting in the series "struggl[ing] to find a way to maintain the tension and mounting helplessness of John's situation". While describing the series as "very enjoyable and unusual", he also felt that it failed to justify its existence, expressing that "there's really very little that's gained by updating the story to present day". Awarding the first episode three out of five stars, Knox criticised, among other aspects of the production, what he saw as a "heavy-handed approach to the locals as menacing, manipulative and two-sided" in comparison to the benevolently friendly nature of the characters in the film, and felt that Wenham's portrayal of Crawford was inferior to Chips Rafferty's. However, he praised Stender's commitment to retaining most of the original story and the performances of Keenan and Dimitriades, concluding that Wake in Fright is a "good entry point to Kenneth Cook's story".

Luke Buckmaster of The Guardian was critical; in a two-star (out of five) review, he questioned the need for a contemporisation of a novel and film whose themes and visual iconography are "more or less timeless". Noting that the series "fails to even propose an interesting answer" as to why The Yabba's populace would be proud of their town, he criticised the Jaffries' role as "cartoonish drug dealers and lowlifes" for "shifting the focus from cold beer as a sign of progress to a general thirst for mind-altering drugs", as well as John's newly-devised "traumatic backstory" and the reimagining of Doc Tydon as a "Dr. Gonzo Down Under [which] belongs to an uninspiring digression from the original story". Buckmaster believed that John's interactions with these characters results in "standard issue crime story plotting" that "reduces the impact of Grant's downward spiralling trajectory, placing more emphasis on external forces", and decried Geoffrey Hall's cinematography for looking "bright rather than burnt, and lack[ing] visual flavour". Jason Di Rosso of ABC Radio National expressed similar sentiments:

It begins promisingly, with a sense of menace that Stenders builds well, but it sells itself short in the second half as almost every character is given a backstory to explain their actions or account for their demise. So much for bush existentialism. It reeks of lowest common denominator free to air television plotting, and the promise of a weirder, more unhinged story in the mould of so much great American TV drama is squandered in the mistaken belief that free to air audiences can't handle ambiguity.

=== Accolades ===
Year	Award	Category	Recipient	Result
2017	7th AACTA Awards	Best Telefeature or Mini Series	Helen Bowden, Kristian Moliere	Nominated
2017	7th AACTA Awards	Best Lead Actor – Drama	Sean Keenan	Nominated
2017	7th AACTA Awards	Best Guest or Supporting Actor – Drama	David Wenham	Nominated
2017	7th AACTA Awards	Best Cinematography in Television	Geoffrey Hall	Nominated
2017	7th AACTA Awards	Best Sound in Television	Stephen Smith, Liam Price, Paul Brincat, Shanti Burn, Tony Murtagh	Won
2017	7th AACTA Awards	Best Original Music Score in Television	Antony Partos, Matteo Zingales	Won
2017	7th AACTA Awards	Best Costume Design in Television	Mariot Kerr	Nominated
2018	New York Festivals – World's Best TV and Films	Silver World Medal: Mini-Series	Lingo Pictures, Endemol Shine Australia	Won
2018	Australian Guild of Screen Composers	Best Music for a Mini-Series or Telemovie	Antony Partos, Matteo Zingales	Nominated
2018	Logie Awards	Most Outstanding Supporting Actor	Alex Dimitriades	Nominated
2018	Logie Awards	Most Outstanding Miniseries or Telemovie	Network Ten	Nominated
2018	Asian Television Awards	Best Single Drama or Telemovie Programme	Network Ten	Nominated

=== Home media ===
Roadshow Entertainment released both episodes on streaming services in Australia on 17 October 2017, and on DVD on 29 November. The DVD includes a 10-minute behind-the-scenes featurette containing brief interviews with key cast and crew members.
