= Jacqueline Kent =

Australian journalist, biographer and non-fiction and young adult fiction writer

- Born: Jacqueline Frances Kent; 1947 (age 78–79); Sydney, New South Wales, Australia
- Education: Doctorate of Creative Arts
- Alma mater: University of Technology Sydney
- Occupations: Biographer, non-fiction writer
- Spouse: Kenneth Cook
- Writing career
- Notable works: A Certain Style: Beatrice Davis, a Literary Life; An Exacting Heart: The Story of Hephzibah Menuhin
- Notable awards: National Biography Award; Nita Kibble Literary Award

Jacqueline Frances Kent (born 1947) is an Australian journalist, biographer and non-fiction writer. She is also known as Jacquie Kent, the name she used when writing young adult fiction in the 1990s and sometimes writes as Frances Cook.

== Career ==
Kent was born in Sydney in 1947 and later moved to Adelaide, returning to Sydney to a position with the Australian Broadcasting Commission following graduation with an Arts degree.

Kent wrote her first book, Out of the Bakelite Box: The Heyday of Australian Radio, while working as a freelance editor. Published in 1983 by Angus & Robertson, it was described by Maurice Dunlevy in The Canberra Times: "This popular social history of Australian radio after World War II is a classic piece of book journalism" and "a buzz from beginning to end". In 1985 she curated an exhibition called "On Air" for the National Film and Sound Archive.

She was appointed to the judging panel for the National Short Story of the Year competition for 1984 and 1985.

In 1985 she met Kenneth Cook, subject of her 2019 memoir, Beyond Words, and author of Wake in Fright. They married and were together until his sudden death in April 1987.

Kent is a frequent contributor to and book reviewer for Australian publications, including Australian Book Review, Meanjin, The Weekend Australian, The Sydney Morning Herald and The Age. She has contributed five biographies to the Australian Dictionary of Biography.

In 2007 Kent was awarded a Doctorate of Creative Arts from the University of Technology Sydney for her thesis, "Artistry Under Oath: Biography and the life story of Hephzibah Menuhin". The following year it was published by Viking as An Exacting Heart.

== Awards and recognition ==
=== Book awards ===
- A Certain Style
  - National Biography Award, winner, 2002
  - Nita Kibble Literary Award, winner, 2002
  - New South Wales Premier's Literary Awards Douglas Stewart Prize for Non-Fiction, shortlisted, 2002
- An Exacting Heart
  - The Age Book of the Year Award, Non-Fiction Prize, shortlisted, 2008
  - Queensland Premier's Literary Awards, Best Non-Fiction Book and Best History Book, shortlisted, 2008
  - Nita Kibble Literary Award, winner, 2009
  - New South Wales Premier's Literary Awards, Douglas Stewart Prize for Non-Fiction and Community Relations Commission Award, shortlisted, 2009
  - Festival Awards for Literature (SA), Award for Non-Fiction, shortlisted, 2010
  - The Australian Historical Association Awards, Magarey Medal for Biography, shortlisted, 2010
- Beyond Words: A Year with Kenneth Cook
  - National Biography Award, shortlisted, 2020

=== Fellowships ===
- Beatrice Davis Editorial Fellowship, 1994
- Hazel Rowley Literary Fellowship
  - shortlisted, for a biography of Robert Helpmann, 2016
  - winner, for a biography of Vida Goldstein, 2018

== Works ==
=== Biography and memoir ===
- A Certain Style: Beatrice Davis, a Literary Life, Viking, 2001
- An Exacting Heart: The Story of Hephzibah Menuhin, Viking, 2008
- The Making of Julia Gillard, Viking, 2009
- Take Your Best Shot: The Prime Ministership of Julia Gillard, Penguin, 2013
- Beyond Words: A Year with Kenneth Cook, University of Queensland Press, 2019
- Vida: A Woman For Our Time, Penguin, 2020

=== Non-fiction ===
- Out of the Bakelite Box: The Heyday of Australian Radio, Angus & Robertson, 1983
- In the Half Light: Life as a Child in Australia 1900–1970, Angus & Robertson, 1988
- Inconvenient Women: Australian Radical Writers 1900–1970, University of New South Wales Press, 2025

=== Young adult fiction ===
- Angel Claws, I Love You, Puffin, 1992
- Heartbreak High, 1998
- Making Up, Breaking Up, ABC Books, 1998
- Love, Hate, ABC Books, 1998
- Secrets and Lies, ABC Books, 1999
- Tough Call, ABC Books, 1999
