= Anna Samson =

Australian actress (born 1989)

- Born: Anna May Samson; 23 November 1989 (age 36); England, United Kingdom
- Education: Victorian College of the Arts
- Occupation: Actress
- Years active: 2007–present

Anna May Samson (born 23 November 1989) is a British-born Australian actress of stage and screen. Since graduating from the Victorian College of the Arts, Samson has performed extensively for major theatre companies, receiving nominations at the Helpmann Awards and the Sydney Theatre Awards for her performances. She made her television debut in the 2012 miniseries Conspiracy 365, and went on to appear in various TV drama series, including Jack Irish and Winners & Losers. In 2016, Samson made her feature film debut in Crime & Punishment. The following year, she starred in feature film What If It Works?, SBS drama Dead Lucky, and the miniseries Wake in Fright. From 2021 to 2022, she played Mia Anderson in Home and Away. She portrays DI Mackenzie Clarke in the 2024 Death in Paradise spin-off Return to Paradise, making her the first woman to portray the lead detective in the global hit franchise.

== Early life and education ==
Anna May Samson was born on 23 November 1989 in England, then spent her early years in Maiduguri, Nigeria, where her engineer father was working on construction of a dam. Her family later relocated to Sydney, Australia.

Samson attended the Newtown High School of the Performing Arts and graduated from the Victorian College of the Arts (VCA) in 2010. During her time at the VCA, Samson received the John Tallis Award for Excellence.

== Career ==
After graduating from drama school, Samson joined Red Stitch Actors Theatre and appeared in productions of Wet House, Ruben Guthrie and Day One, A Hotel, Evening. Roles in The Heretic, Simon Stephen’s Birdland, The Sublime and David Hare’s Skylight for the Melbourne Theatre Company as well as Bliss and Pompeii LA for the Malthouse Theatre. Anna starred as Margarita in Eamon Flack's critically acclaimed 2023 production of The Master and Margarita at the Belvoir St Theatre. and in 2024/2025 the award winning production of August; Osage County for both Belvoir and Black Swan.Other appearances in theatre productions include Anatomy of a Suicide, Consent, Love and Dial M For Murder as Margot Wendice.

In April 2024, the BBC confirmed Samson would make television history playing DI Mackenzie Clarke in the Death in Paradise spin-off Return to Paradise. Her casting makes her the first female lead detective in the "Paraverse". The Australian-set series is filmed in Sydney and Illawarra. It centres on Mackenzie's return to her home town of Dolphin Cove, after she is forced to leave London and her job with the Met. The main cast were all confirmed to be returning for the second season, which began production in April 2025.

She stars alongside Luke Ford in the 2017 film What If It Works? from writer-director Romi Trower. Samson plays Grace, an artist who has Dissociative Identity Disorder. The film premiered at the Cinequest Film and VR Festival. That same year, Samson appeared in an episode of The Leftovers, and the four-part SBS drama series Dead Lucky. She also starred in the two-part miniseries Wake in Fright as Michaela "Mick" Jaffries. The series is a television adaptation of the 1971 film of the same name and Samson's character was billed as "a contemporary reinvention" of the role originally played by Jack Thompson. To prepare for the part, Samson watched MMA fights, lifted weights and took up boxing. In 2018, Samson starred in the indie romance film 36 Questions alongside James Mason. She appeared in the 2020 remake of Children of the Corn.

She made her television debut in the 2012 series Conspiracy 365. She had supporting roles in television dramas Jack Irish, Winners & Losers, and Halifax: Retribution. In 2016, Samson appeared in Trudy Hellier and Maria Theodorakis's Australian webseries Little Acorns, a comedy set in a childcare centre. Samson joined the main cast of Home and Away as Mia Anderson in February 2021. She was introduced alongside Sam Barrett, who plays Mia's daughter Chloe Anderson. The pair were given connection to the other characters through Mia's relationship with Ari Parata (Rob Kipa-Williams). Just over a year later, Samson departed the serial in April 2022.

Samson also appears in Andrew O'Keefe's Crime & Punishment, an adaptation of Dostoevsky's novel of the same name and starred in the horror short Tanglewood, which was shown at Monster Fest.

== Personal life ==
Following her appearance in an episode of The Doctor Blake Mysteries, Samson, along with actress Tamzen Hayes, accused lead actor Craig McLachlan of sexual harassment on the set. Samson alleged that McLachlan touched her buttock during their scenes together, making her forget her lines.

== Filmography ==
=== Film ===
Year	Title	Role	Notes
2016	Crime & Punishment	Sonya Marmelade	
2016	Tanglewood	Sarah	Short film
2017	What If It Works?	Grace	
2018	36 Questions	Gabrielle	
2020	Children of the Corn	Sheila Boyce	

=== Television ===
Year	Title	Role	Notes
2012	Conspiracy 365	Natalie	Episode: "February"
2013	Offspring	Claire	Episode: "The Things We Do For Love"
2014	Winners & Losers	Hayley Baxter	Recurring role
2015	The Doctor Blake Mysteries	Wendy Smith	Episode: "By the Southern Cross"
2016	Hunters	Steph Le Guin	Recurring role
2016	Little Acorns	Anna	Web series
2017	The Leftovers	Young Woman with Beret	Episode: "It's a Matt, Matt, Matt, Matt World"
2017	Wake in Fright	Michaela "Mick" Jaffries	Miniseries
2018	Jack Irish	Kendra Raspovic	Recurring role
2018	Dead Lucky	Anna Jamison	Main cast
2020	Halifax: Retribution	Smithy	1 episode
2021–2022	Home and Away	Mia Anderson	Main cast
2024–present	Return to Paradise	DI Mackenzie Clarke	Main cast

=== Stage ===
Year	Production	Role	Company/theatre
2007	Alice Dreaming	Alice	Australian Theatre for Young People
2009	Innocence – The Life and Death of Caravaggio	Lena	Victorian College of the Arts
2010	Ghetto	Lina the Dummy	Victorian College of the Arts
2010	O'Horo – The Dance of Death	Achilles	Victorian College of the Arts
2011	Ruben Guthrie	Zoya	Red Stitch Actors Theatre
2011	After All This	Performer	Melbourne Fringe Festival
2011	Day One, A Hotel, Evening	Rose Darby	Red Stitch Actors Theatre
2012	The Heretic	Phoebe	Melbourne Theatre Company
2012	Pompeii LA	Make-up Artist	Malthouse Theatre
2013	Arden v Arden		The Hayloft Project
2014	The Bitter Tears of Petra von Kant	Karin	Theatre Works
2014	The Sublime	Amber	Melbourne Theatre Company
2015	Wet House	Kerry	Red Stitch Actors Theatre
2015	Birdland	Marnie / Lucy / Sophie / Nicola	Melbourne Theatre Company
2016	Skylight	Kyra Hollis	Melbourne Theatre Company
2018	Bliss	Honey Barbara	Malthouse Theatre
2018	Love	Tanya	Darlinghurst Theatre
2019	Anatomy of a Suicide	Carol	Old Fitzroy Theatre
2022	Anatomy of a Suicide	Anna	The Reginald Theatre
2023	The Master and Margarita	Margarita	Belvoir St Theatre
2023	Consent	Kitty	The Everest Theatre

== Awards and nominations ==
For her role in a 2015 production of Birdland, Samson was nominated for Best Female Actor in a Supporting Role in a Play at the 16th Helpmann Awards in 2016. For her performance in a 2023 production of Consent, she was nominated at the Sydney Theatre Awards nomination for Best Performance Ina Leading Role in an Independent Production.

In 2025, Samson received a nomination for Best Lead Actress in a Drama at the 65th Logie Awards for her role in the television series Return to Paradise.
