= Bloodhouse =

Bloodhouse may refer to:

- Bloodhouse, a Finnish video game developer that merged with Terramarque to form Housemarque
- Bloodhouse, a rough pub in Australia
- Bloodhouse, a 1974 novel by Kenneth Cook
