= List of Home and Away characters introduced in 2021 =

Home and Away is an Australian television soap opera. It was first broadcast on the Seven Network on 17 January 1988. The following is a list of characters that appeared in 2021, by order of first appearance. All characters are introduced by the soap's executive producer, Lucy Addario. The 34th season of Home and Away began airing on 1 February 2021. Susie McAllister, Chloe Anderson and Mia Anderson were introduced during the same month. Sienna Blake, Allegra Freeman and Emmett Ellison made their debuts in April. Rachel Young arrived in late May, followed by Cash Newman in June. Logan Bennett and Felicity Newman were introduced in August. Theo Poulos made his debut in September.

== Susie McAllister ==
Susie McAllister
- Home and Away character
- Portrayed by: Bridie Carter
- First appearance: 4 February 2021
- Last appearance: 31 March 2021
- Introduced by: Lucy Addario
In-universe information
- Other names: Imogen Simons; Sue Mack; Tracey McAllister
- Occupation: Real estate agent

Susan "Susie" McAllister, played by Bridie Carter, made her first appearance on 4 February 2021. Carter's casting details were announced on 10 August 2020. She began filming during the same week. Carter was pleased to be offered the role during the COVID-19 pandemic, calling it unexpected. She stated "I was astounded and ecstatic at the same time. I am very fortunate and very grateful because I have a lot of friends who are sitting in a very precarious position." Carter has previously appeared in the serial as Toni Jarvis and Brooke Taylor in 1995 and 1999. Susan is a real estate agent who relocates from Western Australia to Summer Bay. Carter described her as "a really fun, dynamic woman" and "fiercely independent". She also said Susan "befriends certain people quite particularly." Daniel Kilkelly of Digital Spy later reported that she would a possible love interest for John Palmer (Shane Withington). The character was killed off in June 2021, starting a whodunnit storyline.

Following her move to Summer Bay, Susie is first required to help Tori Morgan (Penny McNamee) and Christian Green (Ditch Davey) who are in search of a new home. She soon has her eye on John Palmer (Shane Withington) and approaches him while he is dining alone at Salt; the pair initially hit it off and Susie takes keen interest in John's personal life. The two eventually become more involved with one another and when Susie claims she has no place to live, John agrees to let her move in. Susie shows signs of suspicious behaviour when she begins asking questions and searching through John's bank statements, aside from feeling uninterested every time John touches her. Susie then persuades John to run for Surf Club president, much to Alf Stewart's (Ray Meagher) shock as it is unusual for anyone to run against him for president. Marilyn Chambers (Emily Symons) confronts John about his sudden change of character since he has started seeing Susie, causing her to clash with Susie on a number of occasions. Fed up with Marilyn's interference, Susie presents Marilyn with divorce papers from John. Following John's appointment as president, Susie persuades him to raise money for the Surf Club's renovation and she attempts to get sponsorship from local businesses such as the diner and the gym.

Leah Patterson (Ada Nicodemou) and Justin Morgan (James Stewart) decide to enlist Susie's help in finding them a new house, while Irene Roberts (Lynne McGranger), having felt that something was not right with Susie since she first arrived, become more suspicious of her. Susie sees Irene as a threat and accuses her of being attracted to John. John urges the women to make peace and invites them to dinner; Susie orders three glasses of wine and drugs Irene's drink, however, she is unaware that Irene is a teetotaler. John drinks the unwanted wine and become violently ill. Irene realises that the wine meant for her was drugged, which sparks her suspicions even further when Susie refuses to seek medical help for John. Justin and Leah receive the news that the house they believe was sold to them is not actually theirs. Irene and Willow Harris (Sarah Roberts) soon discover that Susie McAllister does not exist when they stumble across a photo of Susie with the name Imogen Simons attached. Susie tries to convince everyone that Irene is spreading lies about her and advises Justin and Leah that there was an administrative error with the house which she intends to rectify. All becomes clear when Susie decides it is time to flee with Justin and Leah's life savings, along with the Surf Club funds. Irene confronts her and Susie drugs her with chloroform. Susie finally makes her escape, leaving John heartbroken, while Justin and Leah realise that they have lost all $90,000 of their money, as there is no trace of anyone by the name of Susie McAllister.

Several weeks pass and Leah is still determined to find Susie, while trying to convince John to help her. She eventually comes into contact with another of Susie's victims, Stephen Tennyson (Bren Foster), via an online forum, who claims that he and Susie had a brief relationship before she ran off with his life savings. Leah, John and Stephen continue their search to no avail, until John receives text messages from Susie. They plan a meeting that proves unsuccessful when she does not appear. Susie's body is recovered from the ocean and it is determined that she was killed by blunt force trauma to the skull, not drowning. The police realise that Susie could not have sent the texts to John, as she was already dead. Justin becomes the prime suspect after Susie's phone is found in his car. Leah later realises Stephen is the culprit, after finding a burner phone, Susie's laptop, and her and Justin's money in his motel room. Stephen tries to escape Summer Bay with Leah in fear that she will turn him in, but is eventually arrested and charged with Susie's murder.

== Chloe Anderson ==
Chloe Anderson
- Home and Away character
- Portrayed by: Sam Barrett
- Duration: 2021–2022
- First appearance: 11 February 2021
- Last appearance: 21 July 2022
- Introduced by: Lucy Addario
In-universe information
- Occupation: Bartender; Waitress; Food truck owner
- Father: Matthew Montgomery
- Mother: Mia Anderson
- Stepfather: Ari Parata
- Half-brothers: Kauri

Chloe Anderson, played by Sam Barrett, made her first appearance on 11 February 2021. Barrett's casting was announced in November 2020, after she was seen filming scenes at the show's outdoor location. Barrett told Stephanie McKenna of PerthNow that she had always wanted to appear in Home and Away, and she auditioned for the show five times, before she was cast as Chloe. Barrett had to relocate to Sydney, where the show's studios are located. She said the process from the audition to filming happened in "just a few weeks". She also said "My first day on set didn't even feel real, it felt a bit like a dream. I learn a lot every day from everyone, and from the crew as well. That's my favourite part about working on the show, everyone's always willing to help you as a new actor." Chloe is introduced along with her mother Mia Anderson (Anna Samson). They both have a connection to established character Ari Parata (Rob Kipa-Williams), who was in a relationship with Mia. Chloe saw Ari as a father figure before he went to prison. Chloe is billed as "a smart and sassy" young adult, who shares her mother's "intelligence and rebelliousness". Chloe comes to Summer Bay with her friend and Ari's nephew Nikau Parata (Kawakawa Fox-Reo), whom she meets in New Zealand. She hopes to reconcile the father/daughter relationship she had with Ari. Barrett felt that when it comes to Ari and Nikau, Chloe is "quite determined to reconnect." Chloe is also a potential love interest for Ryder Jackson (Lukas Radovich). The character's biological father Matthew Montgomery (James Sweeny) was introduced in November 2021. After 18 months in the role, Barrett made her last appearance as Chloe during an episode broadcast on 21 July 2022. The character leaves the Bay to join her mother Mia in New Zealand.

Chloe attempts to order an alcoholic cocktail at Salt, but Ryder Jackson refuses to make her one as she does not have her ID, so she orders a pizza instead. Chloe then meets up with Nikau Parata, who tells her that her presence is going to shake things up. Chloe returns to Salt and gives Ryder unwanted advice about making a good martini. Nikau takes Chloe to see his uncle Ari, her stepfather, who she has not seen in a number of years. She explains to him that she met Nikau while she was backpacking around New Zealand and that her mother, Mia, does not know she is in Summer Bay. Chloe has dinner with the family and is invited to stay for the night. The following day, Chloe and Ari talk about why she is in the Bay and how she felt when he went to prison. Chloe tells him that she was angry with him for missing so many moments in her life, but her mother told her that he did not want to see them anymore, which she knows is a lie. Ari tells Chloe that when he went to prison, he and her mother agreed that it was not a place for children to visit and he thought that she would explain this to Chloe. Chloe says that she and her mother just moved away. Ari urges Chloe to call her mother to let her know where she is. When Mia arrives, Chloe confronts her about the lies she told and refuses to leave with her, as she wants to stay and get to know Ari again. Nikau introduces Chloe to his girlfriend Bella Nixon (Courtney Miller) and helps her secure a job at Salt, after she goes up against Ryder in a cocktail making competition.

== Mia Anderson ==
Mia Anderson
- Home and Away character
- Portrayed by: Anna Samson
- Duration: 2021–2022
- First appearance: 11 February 2021
- Last appearance: 28 April 2022
- Introduced by: Lucy Addario
In-universe information
- Occupation: Personal trainer
- Mother: Sophia
- Husband: Ari Parata (2022)
- Sons: Kauri
- Daughters: Chloe Anderson

Mia Anderson, played by Anna Samson, made her first appearance on 11 February 2021. The character and Samson's casting details were announced on 3 January 2021. Mia is introduced as the former partner of Ari Parata (Rob Kipa-Williams) and mother of Chloe Anderson (Sam Barrett). Their arrival helps further exploration of Ari's fictional backstory, as it emerges that he went to prison after his and Mia's baby died. Mia then chose to move away with Chloe, who lost her father figure. Mia is reunited with Ari when she comes to Summer Bay to collect her daughter. She is billed as "an intelligent, gutsy and strong-willed mother-of-one." Samson departed the serial on 28 April 2022, after Mia decides she can no longer remain in the Bay following Ari's death. Chloe decides to stay in the Bay, but understands why Mia wants to leave. Barrett commented "Ari was her mum's soulmate and, in a lot of ways, the glue that held their family together." Ari's brother Tane Parata (Ethan Browne) gives Mia a ticket to New Zealand, so she can start over, and the family say their goodbyes after a pizza party.

Mia comes to Summer Bay after learning her daughter Chloe Anderson has followed Nikau Parata there. Mia's former partner Ari attempts to get in contact with Chloe and Nikau, and later learns that they have gone up the coast. Ari confronts Mia about the lies she told Chloe as they wait. Upon her return, Chloe also confronts her mother about lying about Ari and refuses to leave with her. Mia admits that she never meant to hurt her and she thought she was doing the right thing in order to protect her. Mia asks Chloe how she can fix things, but Chloe wants to stay in order to get her head around everything. Ari also refuses to help Mia, telling her that Chloe can stay for as long as she wants in order to get to know him again. The following day, Mia admits to Ari that she tried to tell Chloe the truth about his departure, but she struggled with all the questions. She tells him that she never meant to hurt either of them. Ari tells her that he understands why she did what she did. Chloe tells Mia that she has the chance of a job at a local restaurant and Mia agrees she can accept it. She then tells Ari that she intends to stay in the Bay too.

== Sienna Blake ==
Sienna Blake
- Home and Away character
- Portrayed by: Rose Riley
- First appearance: 29 April 2021
- Last appearance: 5 July 2021
- Introduced by: Lucy Addario
In-universe information
- Occupation: Modelling agent

Sienna Blake, played by Rose Riley, made her first appearance on 29 April 2021. The character and Riley's casting was announced on 26 April. Sienna was introduced as part of a storyline exploring the world of modelling and photography involving Nikau Parata (Kawakawa Fox-Reo). Daniel Kilkelly noted that she shared a name and a "scheming" personality with the Hollyoaks character of the same name. He also said that as the storyline progresses, Sienna's ruthless side emerges and added "Has Nikau unknowingly made a deal with the devil?" Of Sienna first scenes, Stephanie McKenna of The West Australian observed: "It's the standard new character intro for this show, they all start out as baddies looking for trouble." McKenna thought Sienna was planning on making Nikau "her toy boy", and later branded her "the master manipulator".

Sienna contacts Nikau Parata after seeing an award-winning photograph of him and arranges a meeting. Nikau's uncle Ari Parata (Rob Kipa-Williams) also joins them and asks Sienna what she wants with his nephew. She offers Nikau a modelling contact, which he initially turns down, until she agrees to provide his girlfriend Bella Nixon (Courtney Miller) with an internship with a top photographer. Sienna is surprised when Nikau and Bella turn up together at SLM Management to create Nikau's portfolio. Sienna takes Nikau off to brief him on what to expect, and they join Bella and Emmett Ellison (Jaime Robbie Reyne) to take his first photographs. Nikau walks out on the session as he is uncomfortable, but soon returns and Emmett gets Bella to give him directions, which Sienna loves and she calls Nikau a natural. A few days later, Nikau is booked for a fashion campaign alongside Allegra Freeman (Laura McDonald), which is overseen by Sienna. She tells Nikau to attend a party thrown by the client and when Bella tries to get him out of it, Sienna tells her to re-read his contract. Days later, Sienna and Emmett turn up at the Parata's house. Sienna claims her PA forgot to call ahead and Ari invites them to stay for dinner. Nikau and Bella take them to Salt for drinks, where Sienna shows Nikau his new social media account. She arranges an impromptu photoshoot for Nikau and she invites Allegra along. Sienna asks Allegra to keep Nikau focused and stop him from looking bad, as he will be good for her career. During the shoot, Sienna makes Bella fetch coffees to get her out of the way, and she later tells Allegra to kiss Nikau which Bella witnesses. Nikau threatens to quit, but Sienna manipulates him by blaming Allegra and then telling him that Bella would also lose her internship. Nikau decides to continue after seeing his first pay cheque. Sienna encourages Nikau to increase his online follower count with the help of Allegra by hosting a pool party at his house. She overhears a disagreement between him and Bella, and she and Allegra later mention how relationships with those not in the industry do not work out. Nikau tells Sienna that he is committed to Bella, which leads her to tell Bella that she cannot use any photographs of Nikau in her exhibition, unless she pays his daily fee. Emmett and Bella try to reason with Sienna, and Nikau threatens to withdraw from a major fashion shoot in Japan if she does not release the photos.

During another shoot, Sienna manipulates Allegra into creating a wedge between Nikau and Bella, after she learns that Nikau wants Bella to come to Japan with him. Nikau helps bring up a box of clothes to Sienna's apartment, and while he is waiting for a limo to take him to Bella's exhibition, Sienna tells him about her failed relationship with Emmett and tries to keep him from leaving. She tells Allegra to get something more, and when Allegra sends through photos of Emmett and Bella looking intimate, Sienna seduces Nikau and they have sex. The following day, Emmett is injured in an explosion and Nikau has to call Sienna to see if she has details of any family members. She later turns up in the Bay and Nikau confronts her about setting him up. Sienna spends the afternoon looking at Emmett and Bella's exhibition, while Nikau worries that she is going to tell Bella what happened between them. Nikau later tells Sienna that he is done with her, modelling, and he is not going to Japan because of what she did to him and Bella. Sienna responds by threatening to tell Bella what happened between them.

Sienna calls Nikau and Allegra for a last minute fashion shoot. Bella confronts Sienna and tells her that Nikau is not her pet. Sienna apologises and then offers Bella the chance to be the photographer for the shoot, after their photographer fell through. Bella accepts, but Nikau tells Sienna to leave her out of it. Bella sources a new location for the shoot, which goes well once Nikau relaxes. Allegra later tells Sienna that getting Nikau offside could jeopardise the Japan trip. Nikau's uncle Tane Parata (Ethan Browne) joins Sienna for a drink and she tries to seduce him, but he warns her not to mess with Nikau. Bella learns that Nikau cheated on her and she confronts Sienna, and has to be pulled away. Tane calls Sienna a player and tells her to leave town. Sienna gloats that she was always going to win and now Nikau is free to go to Japan. However, Nikau tells Sienna that he is done with modelling. Emmett comes across Sienna in the Diner and tells her that Bella deleted the photos from the shoot. She then informs Nikau that she will not be paying him, and he tells her it is fine as long as she stays away from Bella.

== Allegra Freeman ==
Allegra Freeman
- Home and Away character
- Portrayed by: Laura McDonald
- First appearance: 29 April 2021
- Last appearance: 1 July 2021
- Introduced by: Lucy Addario
In-universe information
- Occupation: Model

Allegra Freeman, played by Laura McDonald, made her first appearances on 29 April 2021. McDonald's character and casting details were announced on 23 April 2021. The character was introduced as part of a big storyline set in the modelling industry centred around Nikau Parata (Kawakawa Fox-Reo) and Bella Nixon (Courtney Miller). McDonald confirmed the plot would also focus on disordered eating, as well as body image from male and female perspectives involving social media. Of her casting, McDonald stated: "I am a 25-year-old size 10 woman, so when this audition brief came to me I kind of assumed I was past it age-wise. I'm also just not in the right size bracket to even be considered for the role. They have done an amazing job." Allegra was billed as a "sexy and scandalous model" who works with Nikau. She was also called "morally challenged" by Kerry Harvey of Stuff.

Allegra is being photographed by Emmett Ellison (Jaime Robbie Reyne) when he notices Bella Nixon watching on. He invites her to sit in the rest of the session. Nikau Parata is booked to appear with Allegra for a clothing campaign, but he struggles to relax and Allegra advises him to look at her the way he looks at Bella. The rest of the shoot is a success and Nikau thanks Allegra for her help. Their agent Sienna Blake (Rose Riley) arranges an impromptu photoshoot for Nikau in Summer Bay and asks Allegra to take part. Sienna tells her to keep Nikau focused, as he could be good for her career. Nikau finds it hard to focus and Sienna directs him and Allegra to get closer together. She also tells Allegra to bring more sex appeal and then orders her to kiss Nikau on her cue, which Bella witnesses. Nikau ends the photoshoot early to go after Bella. Sienna later tells Allegra not to worry about what happened. Allegra helps Nikau increase his social media presence with some new photos. She gives him advice about body image and then hands him an appetite suppressant made by a friend. Allegra continues to help Nikau with his social media following. When Bella asks her to back off from Nikau, Allegra tells her that he is not her type. Sienna asks Allegra to go to Bella and Emmett's photo exhibition and create a wedge between Nikau and Bella, or the Japanese assignment will be cancelled. Allegra finds and uses Bella's phone to send a text to Nikau telling him the exhibition is opening late. She continues to text Nikau that he does not need to rush and deletes his replies. Sienna asks Allegra for something more, as Nikau is getting restless, so she sends back photos of Emmett and Bella looking intimate. Sienna calls Allegra and Nikau for a last minute fashion shoot in the Bay. Bella is hired as their photographer and she confronts Allegra for deleting the texts from Nikau and sending him the photo of her and Emmett. Nikau struggles to relax during the shoot and Allegra reveals that she knows about his one-night stand with Sienna. She tells him to get it together as she will not let him mess things up for her. Nikau also confronts Allegra about the texts and for messing up his life, while Allegra tells him that the Japan trip is her last chance to make it big. She refuses to take the blame for Nikau having sex with Sienna, and advises him to do what Sienna wants. Later at Salt, Allegra teases Sienna about wanting Bella to fail and torturing Nikau. Allegra tells her that getting him offside could jeopardise the Japan trip. Nikau later quits the agency, after the truth about him and Sienna comes out.

== Emmett Ellison ==
Emmett Ellison
- Home and Away character
- Portrayed by: Jaime Robbie Reyne
- Duration: 2021–2022
- First appearance: 29 April 2021
- Last appearance: 2 June 2022
- Introduced by: Lucy Addario
In-universe information
- Occupation: Photographer

Emmett Ellison, played by Jaime Robbie Reyne, made his first appearances on 29 April 2021. Reyne's casting details were announced on 23 April 2021. Reyne said he "leapt" at the role when it came up after his plans to go on tour with his band were cancelled due to the COVID-19 pandemic. He explained: "I had just moved to Sydney from Melbourne and a month later lockdown happened. I had a tour lined up that was going to keep me busy for the year and I remember the week before lockdown happened going out and celebrating the tour. And then, all of a sudden, live music was the first thing to be pulled. I had just moved into a new house and was thinking, 'OK, so where do we go from here?'" Reyne's character is introduced as part of a big storyline set in the modelling industry and centred around Nikau Parata (Kawakawa Fox-Reo) and Bella Nixon (Courtney Miller). It also focuses on "body image and the social-media pressure". Emmett is a professional photographer who Bella is invited to work with, however, she realises that "life behind the lens isn't what she expects." Reyne was able to bring personal experience to the role, as he modelled when he was younger, his mother was a model, and his godmother was a photographic agent. Reyne reprised the role the following year, as Emmett returns to the Bay to offer Bella a job overseas.

While photographing Allegra Freeman (Laura McDonald), Emmett notices Bella Nixon watching and he invites her to sit in on the rest of the session. When he finishes, Bella talks with him about the lens he is using. Her boyfriend Nikau Parata and his agent Sienna Blake (Rose Riley) enter the studio and Bella realises who Emmett is. Nikau struggles in his photoshoot and Emmett tries to give him some direction, but Nikau walks out. When he and Bella return, Emmett asks Bella to give Nikau the directions, as she has worked with him before. The rest of the photoshoot is a success and Sienna is pleased with the photographs. After Nikau and Allegra take part in a shoot for a clothing campaign, they all attend an after party, where Emmett tries to get Bella to dance. He then offers to deal with Sienna, so Nikau can come and spend time with her and her friends. Days later, Emmett and Sienna turn up at the Parata's house and Nikau's uncle Ari Parata (Rob Kipa-Williams) invites them to stay for dinner. Emmett goes over Bella's early work, and he, Sienna, Nikau and Bella go to Salt for drinks. Sienna arranges a photoshoot for Nikau and Allegra the following morning. Allegra kisses Nikau during the shoot, which Bella witnesses. Emmett later warns her to get away from the industry while she still can. Emmett meets Mackenzie Booth (Emily Weir) at Salt and they spend the night together. Emmett argues with Sienna about her manipulation of Nikau and Bella. He eventually tells Bella that Sienna threatened to end her internship in order to keep Nikau in line. Emmett assures Bella that she is talented and offers to collaborate on a photography exhibition with her. Emmett spends the night with Mackenzie again, but her brother Dean Thompson (Patrick O'Connor) warns him to stay away from her. Mackenzie leaves a number of voicemails on Emmett's phone, so he comes to Salt to tell her that their fling is over, causing her to chase him out of Salt.

Sienna tries to lure Emmett back to her agency, and away from the exhibition, with the promise of a big client and more money, but he rejects her offer. Emmett suggests that he and Bella hold a smaller exhibition in preparation for the one in the city. Mackenzie allows them to hold it at Salt and it is a success. The following morning, Emmett is injured when he is caught up in the La Cucaracha taco van explosion. He suffers flash burns to both corneas and Tori Morgan (Penny McNamee) tells him that he might not regain sight in his left eye. Emmett is admitted to an eye hospital out of town, but he returns after Dean Thompson (Patrick O'Connor) contacts him to let him know that Nikau cheated on Bella with Sienna. Emmett talks with Bella and convinces her to carry on with the exhibition. She also tells him that she deleted the photos she took from Nikau's latest shoot. Emmett comes across Sienna in the Diner and when she tells him that she needs the photos from Bella, he informs her that Bella deleted them and lies about not having copies. Emmett tells Mackenzie that he is moving to New York City for a job, but struggles to tell Bella. During the exhibition, Nikau grabs a microphone and declares his love for Bella in an attempt to win her back. Emmett tries to stop him, but Nikau pushes him to the ground. Mackenzie advises Emmett not to tell Bella about New York for the moment, however, he reveals the truth after bringing Bella a list of photos that she sold. Emmett leaves town after saying his goodbyes to Bella and Mackenzie. He returns almost a year later to offer Bella a job in New York, which she accepts and they leave the Bay together.

== Rachel Young ==
Rachel Young
- Home and Away character
- Portrayed by: Marny Kennedy
- First appearance: 24 May 2021
- Last appearance: 24 June 2021
- Introduced by: Lucy Addario

Rachel Young, played by Marny Kennedy, made her first appearance on 24 May 2021. Kennedy's casting was confirmed in early 2021, after paparazzi photographs of her filming with actor Ditch Davey (Christian Green) were released. Kennedy was also pictured wearing a neck brace. Home and Away marks Kennedy's first soap opera role. Of her character's introduction, Kennedy stated: "Rachel lands in Home and Away in quite a different way. It is not your normal entry into Summer Bay, it is a bit of a crash land." For her character's storyline, Kennedy had to wear a halo brace and she explained that it took around half an hour to assemble and then fit it to her. She said that by the end, she "had it down to an art and I'm proud that I was able to just flick it on and off."

Rachel bumps into Christian Green as she is leaving the Blue Bird Skydiving office. She admits that she is nervous ahead of her first solo skydive, which is a post-divorce present from her friends. Christian tells her that he has never done anything like skydiving before and is not sure he will get to jump today, but Rachel assures him that he will. Rachel is seriously injured after falling to the ground during her skydive. She is treated by Christian, who has just finished booking his own lesson when the call about Rachel comes through to the office. Christian recognises that Rachel is going into shock and attempts to calm her, before she is taken to Northern Districts Hospital. Rachel's x-rays show that her skull has separated from her spine and is only being held in place by ligaments. Christian informs Rachel that she has suffered a rare atlanto-occipital dislocation, but her spine is intact and he is organising a halo brace for her. Christian reassures Rachel that she is not going to die and he will get her through it. Rachel's condition steadily improves and Christian spends time with her to monitor her progress. Rachel learns that he has postponed his wedding to Tori Morgan (Penny McNamee) and she feels guilty that he chose her over his own wedding.

Christian tells Rachel that he almost died and it made him question everything. He believes that he survived in order to be at the skydiving site to save her. Christian decides to pass Rachel's care to another doctor, but she tells him that if he had ignored that feeling, she would not be alive. She tells him that she actually booked the skydive herself, so may be there was a reason she was there that day too. Rachel's condition steadily improves and she is able to walk around the hospital. Nurse Jasmine Delaney (Sam Frost) tells Rachel that the physio will be taking over her care soon. Tori later finds Christian asleep in Rachel's room when he is meant to be keeping an eye on her brother, and she confronts Rachel about their connection. A couple of weeks later, while they are talking, Christian tells Rachel that he and Tori are taking some time apart. He later calms her down when she suffers a panic attack and arranges some days out to the beach for her. Christian informs Rachel that she is ready to have the halo brace removed and for her to go home. She tells him that it is not necessary a good thing, as she will not see as much of him anymore and he realises that she has feelings for him. She points out that they have a connection, but he tells her that he loves Tori and only sees her as a friend, which she accepts. After Christian removes the brace, Rachel tells him she going to visit the beach one more time to say goodbye. As she is leaving, Rachel walks into the road and is hit by a car. She is brought to the hospital, where Christian takes over resuscitation, but she dies from her injuries.

== Cash Newman ==
Cash Newman
- Home and Away character
- Portrayed by: Nicholas Cartwright
- Duration: 2021–present
- First appearance: 14 June 2021
- Introduced by: Lucy Addario
In-universe information
- Occupation: Senior Constable; Security Guard
- Father: Anthony Newman
- Mother: Jennifer Newman
- Sisters: Felicity Newman
- Wife: Eden Fowler (2025–)

Cash Newman, played by Nicholas Cartwright, made his first appearance on 14 June 2021. The character and Cartwright's casting were revealed during a promotional trailer released on 8 June. Home and Away marks Cartwright's first television role since his graduation from National Institute of Dramatic Art (NIDA). Cartwright had spent six years in the army, before he completed a three-year course at NIDA. The COVID-19 pandemic affected his search for acting work, and he applied to join both the New South Wales Police Force and the Australian Federal Police, while continuing auditions. Cartwright originally auditioned for the guest role of Lewis Hayes (later played by Luke Arnold), but he admitted that he was happy not to have won the part, as Cash was "a much better fit for him." Of joining Home and Away, Cartwright told Kerry Harvey of stuff.co.nz "The exposure the show gets is nothing like I've ever been used to before but, having said that, I'm really excited by it all and it's a real privilege to be here."

Cash is Summer Bay's new police constable. Cartwright felt that his military background, as well as his understanding of rank, helped him with the role. He was aware that the Bay was not the best place to be a police officer, after three previous constables were killed-off and Colby Thorne (Tim Franklin), the officer he replaced, serving a long prison sentence. Cartwright commented "There seems to be a curse, for sure." Cash's "welcome to town is pretty serious" when he has to arrest Justin Morgan (James Stewart), before leading an investigation into a body that washes up. Although billed as a "hot cop", Cartwright said there would be more to his character "than meets the eye." In an interview with Inside Soap's Sarah Ellis, Cartwright said there were skeletons in Cash's closet and he was not the "level-headed guy that he appears to be..." He also said playing a police constable was one of his favourite parts of the job, as he gets to portray all the family and relationship dramas that other characters have, but he also gets to jumps into a police car and chase down a criminal. Cash's sister Felicity Newman (Jacqui Purvis) is later introduced to the serial, and Cartwright told Ellis that he and Purvis had a "fantastic rapport". He said Felicity was the only person Cash could be himself around. Cash also forms a romantic relationship with Jasmine Delaney (Sam Frost). Cartwright thought the couple were "made for each other", and explained "It's just a really nice love story, which is quite rare in soap. They're going from strength to strength, and I'm really excited to see where the writers go with it next." He added that he had a good working relationship with Frost and that they were both looking forward to Cash and Jasmine's romance continuing.

== Logan Bennett ==
Logan Bennett
- Home and Away character
- Portrayed by: Harley Bonner
- Duration: 2021–2022
- First appearance: 10 August 2021
- Last appearance: 6 June 2022
- Introduced by: Lucy Addario
In-universe information
- Occupation: Trauma surgeon

Logan Bennett, played by Harley Bonner, made his first appearance on 10 August 2021. The character and Bonner's casting was announced on 25 March 2021. Of joining the serial, Bonner stated "It's been a while since I've had the privilege of working on a program that's such a hallmark of Australian television. I'm happy to say I picked it back up a lot faster than expected. I really love working on shows like Home and Away, I love my character and I can't wait for Australia to meet him." Bonner filmed some of his first scenes in the studio, before taking part in a week long shoot in Yass as part of the show's mid-season cliffhanger storyline, which introduces his character. Logan's introduction sees him attend the scene of a car accident, involving three of the show's established characters. Clips of Logan helping to load a patient onto a medical helicopter saw him mistaken for a paramedic, but Bonner explained that he is actually a trauma surgeon who has served overseas.

Logan ends up coming to Summer Bay to perform a life saving operation, before deciding to stay to "see his patient's journey through from start to finish". Bonner stated: "That's the main brunt of the character at this point. He's coming in and he's got some more uncouth ways of operating – figuratively and literally – than what Australia is used to and particularly what Summer Bay is used to. But he is effective and he's very confident in what he does. He's a real cheeky character and he's a lot of fun to play." Bonner also called his character "a bit of a nomad" and described him as "capable, compassionate, intelligent and fun." Bonner also expressed his interest in finding out more about his character during his time in the Bay. A few months later, it was confirmed that Logan would be a love interest for Mackenzie Booth (Emily Weir). On 8 January 2022, it was announced that Bonner had left Home and Away, as he had not been vaccinated against COVID-19 and Seven Network requires all staff working on their productions to be vaccinated. A show spokeswoman confirmed Bonner would not be returning to set when filming resumes on the serial and that the role of Logan will not be recast. The character's "abrupt" exit aired on 6 June 2022. After almost being charged with causing death by dangerous driving and breaking up with Mackenzie, Logan decides to re-join the Army Medical Corps. Bonner's voice is heard, as Mackenzie listens to a voicemail from Logan apologising for not telling her that he was leaving.

== Felicity Newman ==
Felicity Newman
- Home and Away character
- Portrayed by: Jacqui Purvis
- Duration: 2021–2024
- First appearance: 19 August 2021
- Last appearance: 19 August 2024
- Introduced by: Lucy Addario
In-universe information
- Occupation: Bartender
- Father: Anthony Newman
- Mother: Jennifer Newman
- Brothers: Cash Newman
- Husband: Tane Parata (2023–2024)

Felicity "Flick" Newman, played by Jacqui Purvis, made her first appearance on 19 August 2021. Purvis's casting was announced in April 2021, after she photographed filming alongside cast member Ethan Browne at Palm Beach. Dan Seddon of Digital Spy believed that she would become a potential love interest for Browne's character Tane Parata. Further details about Purvis's character, including her name, were released on 26 July, as she was featured in a promotional trailer for the show. Purvis originally auditioned for the role of Mackenzie Booth prior to being cast as Felicity. She told Kerry Harvey of Stuff that she was grateful she did not get cast as Mackenzie as she felt Flick was "a dream come true as a character." She continued: "I get to transition from vulnerable and sensitive with my family issues and mental health to the fun side, which is that she is a little pocket rocket who has no filter. So it's a huge, huge blessing and I'm just so grateful that I get to play it." Shortly before her first scenes aired, it was revealed that Felicity is the sister of Cash Newman (Nicholas Cartwright), Summer Bay's newest police officer.

The character's exit aired on 19 August 2024, following Purvis' decision to leave the role and pursue her international career overseas. Scenes broadcast on 12 August saw Felicity collapse at Salt with a brain aneurysm. Cash eventually decides to switch off her life support machine and accompanies Felicity's body through the hospital corridors on an honour walk after choosing to donate her organs.

== Theo Poulos ==
Theo Poulos
- Home and Away character
- Portrayed by: Matt Evans
- Duration: 2021–2025
- First appearance: 9 September 2021
- Last appearance: 2 October 2025
- Introduced by: Lucy Addario
In-universe information
- Occupation: Apprentice mechanic
- Father: Dimitri Poulos
- Mother: Cassandra Poulos
- Aunts: Leah Patterson

Theo Poulos, played by Matt Evans, made his first appearance on 9 September 2021. The character and Evans' casting details were confirmed on 6 September. Evans had little acting experience prior to getting the role, but he said he was learning each day. He stated: "It is like getting paid to go to school. My first day in the studio, I kind of had a bit of a freak out because it's just a lot of people around and I didn't know what I was doing. I'm just trying to learn on the job." Prior to his arrival, it was revealed that Theo would have a connection to one of the show's main characters. It was later revealed that he is the nephew of established regular Leah Patterson (Ada Nicodemou).

The character was initially billed as "a troubled guy in his 20s", although Evans said he would not be "as bad as he appears." Evans explained that his character is fun and often acts first and thinks later, which is what gets him into trouble. He added that Theo "has a good heart when you get down to it." Theo is first seen being pulled over by constable Cash Newman (Nicholas Cartwright) for speeding. He claims he is visiting his family following the death of his aunt, so Cash escorts him to Summer Bay, where Theo admits that he has been kicked out of home by his father. His father is Leah's eldest brother Dimitri Poulos (Salvatore Coco). Leah wants to give Theo a second chance and asks her partner and mechanic Justin Morgan (James Stewart) to hire him. Kerry Harvey of Stuff said Theo "is a far-from-model employee." The character also comes between young couple Ryder Jackson (Lukas Radovich) and Chloe Anderson (Sam Barrett). Evans told Harvey that he believed Theo would redeem himself, especially as there were many secrets still to come out, including his relationship with his father and some things he has tried to keep hidden. He added "It will take time, but the audience will learn why he is the way he is and then they will become a little bit forgiving of him." Coco reprised his role as Theo's father Dimitri in April 2022. Leah invites him to the Bay, unaware of his and Theo's abusive history. In May 2022, Evans received a nomination for the Logie Award for Most Popular New Talent.

Speculation about Evan's departure from the show began in July 2025, after he posted a photograph of his new shorter hairstyle on his social media. Stefania Sarrubba of Digital Spy pointed out that actors do not normally change their hair in order to keep continuity with their character. The character's exit was confirmed via a promotional trailer that aired shortly after he was seen being struck by a car in the episode broadcast on 1 October 2025. Evans further confirmed that his character would be killed off during an appearance on The Morning Show. He filmed his final scenes in June and admitted that it was "surreal" to play dead while others filmed around him. Of Theo's exit, he stated "I think it was quite a shock for a lot of people. Like people knew a character was going to die, but they didn't know it was really Theo. And it happened so quick as well."

== Others ==
Date(s)	Character	Actor	Circumstances
1 February	Officer King	Tom Lopez	A prison guard who accompanies an injured Colby Thorne to the hospital. When Colby is sent for a scan, Officer King goes with him.
1 February–	Ambo #1/ Ambulance Officer #2	Christopher Daw	A paramedic who collects Colby Thorne from Graydon Prison and brings him to the hospital. Ambo #1 helps Lewis Hayes treat Colby when he suffers a seizure in the ambulance. A few months later, he helps bring Justin Morgan to the hospital when he collapses at his garage. The character was credited as Ambo #1 in his first appearance, and Ambulance Officer #2 in his second.
1 February 2021–	Ambo #2/ Ambulance Officer Jo/ Paramedic Jo	Katie Horky	One of the paramedics who collects Colby Thorne from Graydon Prison and brings him to the hospital. A few months later, she and her colleague bring Justin Morgan to the hospital and she informs Tori Morgan that he is semi-conscious with no signs of external trauma. She also brings in Marilyn Chambers, who is suffering the effects of organophosphate poisoning. The following year, Jo brings Ari Parata to the hospital and tells Logan Bennett that Ari has intermittent, severe abdominal pain with nausea and vomiting. She adds that they administered analgesia and put in an IV. Weeks later, Jo attends the scene of a car accident and goes to check on Millie first, before treating Logan. She and her partner bring Millie to the hospital, where she tells Logan that her sats are dropping and air entry on the right side is diminishing. Jo treats Dana Matheson for a fentanyl overdose and tells Cash Newman that she is not responding to the medication to reverse it. At the hospital, she tells Bree Cameron that Dana has had a seizure and there has been no response to the naloxone. Jo attends the scene of Sergeant David Langham's shooting and tells Cash Newman that he has lost a lot of blood and they need to get him to the hospital. There, she explains to Amelia Carlisle that David has a single gunshot wound to the upper quadrant with no exit found. She tells Amelia that he was shot with a police-issue 9mm, and was hypovolemic at the scene, so they commenced fluid resuscitation. The character was originally credited as Ambo #2, before being credited as Ambulance Officer Jo and Paramedic Jo in subsequent appearances.
4 March	Gerald	Stephen Hunter	A member of the Surf Club committee invited to a dinner hosted by John Palmer, who is running for the Surf Club presidency against Alf Stewart. Alf's daughter Roo Stewart tries to get Gerald to talk with her father about an issue, but he tells her that he does not want to argue. Gerald then lets John know that he has his vote.
10 March	Ned	Shaun Martindale	One of Paul and Leon's gang, who kidnaps Nikau Parata, Bella Nixon, Ryder Jackson and Chloe Anderson. Ned grabs Nikau out of the car and is marching him towards a shipping container when Chloe escapes her captor and tries to run away. Ned chases after her and grabs her as she falls. The teens are left in the container overnight, before the gang return in the morning to drag Nikau out.
13 April	Leila Findlay	Deborah An	A reporter who speaks with Alf and Roo Stewart about the theft of the Surf Club fundraising money by Susie McAllister.
27 April	Gus	Anthony Harkin	The owner of a hardware store, who is the major sponsor of Summer Bay's Surf Competition. Irene Roberts goes over to talk with Gus and learns that he has never been to the Bay before. Gus calls the money he donated a good tax write off. They meet Alf Stewart and Gus complements him for managing to pull the Comp together. Gus later bad mouths John Palmer to Irene, but she tells him off and says that John did not stand a chance against Susie McAllister, who scammed him, and neither would Gus.
29 April	Natalie	Scarlet Hunter	A receptionist at the SLM Management modelling agency, who greets Nikau Parata and Bella Nixon. She asks for Nikau's portfolio, but Bella explains that he does not have one and that is why they are there. She later compliments Bella's jacket, then does not answer when Bella asks if she can to walk around the studio.
29 April	Mara	Melanie J. Bowers	A model who walks out of a room at SLM Management in tears.
29 April–6 May	Nancy	Natasha Cheng	Sienna Blake's personal assistant. She takes Nikau Parata's phone to input Sienna's phone number. Nancy later turns on some music at Emmett Ellison's suggestion and watches Nikau's first session. A few days later, Nancy accompanies Sienna on a campaign shoot. Sienna asks Nancy to tell Allegra Freeman to stop being precious and that she will wear what they will give her to wear.
11 May–5 July	Stephen Tennyson	Bren Foster	One of Susie McAllister's victims, who contacts Leah Patterson through a Scam Stop forum. Stephen meets with Leah and John Palmer at Salt, where he explains that Susie contacted him about a property development offer, but she scammed him and he lost everything, including his wife and home. He tells Leah and John that he has been trying to find Susie for years, and wants to join forces, but John refuses to have anything more to do with it and leaves. Leah apologises to Stephen, but he understands that John has been humiliated. She invites him to her home to show him the research she has gathered on Susie and introduces him to her partner Justin Morgan. Stephen and Lean work all evening comparing notes and sightings of Susie. The following day, Leah, Justin and Stephen meet up again to form a plan to find Susie. Irene Roberts introduces herself to Stephen and tells him how Susie poisoned her and knocked her out. Stephen later convinces Leah to pull back from her investigation a little. He also approaches John and confirms that his relationship with Susie was never romantic. Leah, John and Stephen hire a private investigator, and Leah confides in Stephen about her relationship problems. Susie seemingly messages John to arrange a meeting, and Stephen and Leah agree to hide nearby so that they can call the police. However, Susie does not show up. Stephen later learns John is still messaging her and he and Leah persuade John to go to the police with the messages. After Stephen intervenes while Justin and Leah are arguing, he comforts Leah with a hug, which Justin sees. He confronts Stephen and punches him, leading to Stephen's hospitalisation. Leah leans on Stephen for support when Justin's drug addiction worsens. They have dinner together and meet homicide detective Amy Peters, who questions them informally. Stephen points out that he and Leah did not see John receive the texts from Susie. At the end of the night, Stephen goes to kiss Leah, but she pulls back. John later confronts Stephen for implicating him in Susie's murder. They both go to the station after learning Justin has been hospitalised after being questioned. While John talks to Peters, Stephen tries to contact Leah raising Cash's suspicions about their closeness. John tells Stephen that the police found Susie's phone in Justin's car, making him the prime suspect. Stephen talks with Leah about the phone and suggests that Justin could have killed Susie during one of his blackouts. Leah dismisses this, but later turns up at his motel and tells him she thinks Justin might have killed Susie after all. Stephen suggests they go for a walk, where Justin confronts them. At the motel, Stephen suggests that Justin might have accidentally killed Susie and she thinks about going to the police. Stephen fetches them some food, but when Leah says she is going to the station to report Justin, he realises she has found the bag of money, Susie's laptop, and a burner phone that he used to send John the texts. He tells her Susie's death was an accident and that she hit her head when he tried to make a citizens arrest. Stephen implies that they will make a fresh start together, but Leah says she loves Justin and will not let him take the blame. She convinces Stephen to hand himself in, but he panics when he sees the police and tries to run. Cash tackles him and arrests him for Susie's murder. At the station, Stephen apologises to John, knowing he had feelings for Susie.
13 May–	Paramedic Aaron	Akkshey Caplash	The paramedic brings Shonda Evans into Northern Districts Hospital with a severe headache. He reels off her vital signs to Tori Morgan. Aaron later attends the scene of a large organophosphate poisoning at Salt, and assists Logan Bennett while he treats Tane Parata.
13 May	Shonda Evans	Jodine Muir	A patient who tells Tori Morgan that she woke up in pain. Tori carries out some tests and discovers that Shonda has a leaking aneurysm at the base of her brain. Neurosurgeon Christian Green introduces himself and takes Shona in for surgery.
13 May–	Nurse Isabel	Isabel Goudie	The nurse assists Tori Morgan with Shonda Evans' care. She later assists Christian Green with the removal of Rachel Young's halo brace, and Rachel's care when she is brought in after being hit by a car.
13 May	James	Norman Wyndham	Mackenzie Booth notices James sitting alone at a table in Salt. They go back to her flat, where they have sex. James meets Mac's brother Dean Thompson when he retrieves his shirt from the living room and leaves.
20 May	Aaron	Tom O'Connor	A customer at Salt who orders a beer from Mackenzie Booth. After learning that he is not waiting for anyone, Mackenzie later takes him back to her flat for sex.
24 May	JT	Dean Reid	A worker at Blue Bird Skydiving, who books Christian Green in for a tandem skydive. JT asks him why he wants to jump and Christian tells him that he is getting married in a few days. When Christian finishes filling out the paperwork, JT tells him that he will undergo a short training session and Christian heads towards the changing rooms, just as Mike radios in to tell JT that they have a code red. JT and Christian reach the site where Rachel Young has fallen, and Mike tells Christian that she hit the ground hard. JT helps Christian with Rachel's neck and informs him that an ambulance is on the way, while Mike fetches a blanket.
24 May	Mike	Evan Evagora	
2 June	Lachie	Deepak Sharma	Another of Mackenzie Booth's one-night stands, who she brings back to the apartment she shares with her brother Dean Thompson. Lachie greets Dean as he leaves, but Dean tells him that he does not want to see him around ever again.
8 June	Doctor Singh	Thomas Ah Kuoi	The doctor hands over Justin Morgan's medication to his partner Leah Patterson and gives her instructions on dosage.
14 June	Fisherman Mike	Chris Miller	The fisherman shouts across the bay at Leah Patterson to call the police as he has found a body in the water.
15 June	Forensic Police Officer	Vivienne Greer	The Forensic Officer comes to the Bay when a body is pulled from the water. She calls Cash Newman over to tell him they have an identification and hands him Susie McAllister's drivers license.
17 June	Photographer	Corey London	The photographer takes shots of Nikau Parata and Allegra Freeman for a fashion campaign.
22 June	Surfer Robbie	Eddie Nelson	Two people caught up in the La Cucaracha taco van explosion.
22 June	Gym Goer Claire	Indiana Linzbilcher	Two people caught up in the La Cucaracha taco van explosion.
22 June	Lifeguard Jack	Max Belmonte	The lifeguard takes a fire extinguisher from Dean Thompson to continue putting out the fire caused by the La Cucaracha taco van explosion.
22 June	Paramedic Mike	Brenden Dodds	The paramedic attends the scene of the La Cucaracha taco van explosion and brings Jasmine Delaney to the hospital, where he tells Tori Morgan that she has a head injury.
24 June–5 July	Detective Amy Peters	Lisa Flanagan	The detective investigating Susie McAllister's death. Peters interviews Irene Roberts about the last time she saw Susie alive. She then goes to The Farmhouse to ask Ziggy Astoni to come to the station to talk about her boss Justin Morgan. Peters learns Justin has a drug addiction and Ziggy tries to defend him, but she inadvertently reveals that she is afraid to be alone with him. Peters asks Constable Cash Newman to take her somewhere for dinner and they go to Salt, where they join suspects Leah Patterson and Stephen Tennyson for an informal chat. Peters mentions that the texts John Palmer received could not have come from Susie, as she was dead at that point, and Stephen implicates John by pointing out that he and Leah did not actually see John receive the texts. While interviewing John the following day, Peters tells him that she thinks he sent the texts to himself and that he killed Susie. After Susie's phone turns on, Peters and Cash pull Justin over and search his vehicle, where they find the phone. During questioning, Justin tells Peters that he has never seen the phone before and does not know how it got in his car. He then states that he is being set up. Peters continues questioning Justin until he passes out because he is going through withdrawal. Cash insists they stop when Peters wants to continue, and Justin is admitted to hospital. Peters tells Cash not to undermine her again, but Cash replies that interviewing Justin was unethical and a lawyer could have the interview struck from the record. Peters says that she will run the investigation how she sees fit. Peters tells John about the phone to gauge his reaction, while Cash speaks with Stephen. He later tells her about Stephen's closeness with Leah, and mentions how it was convenient that the phone happened to be fully charged when it suddenly turned on. Peters maintains that Justin is still the prime suspect and when he is discharged, she tells him that there is enough to charge him and asks him to confess. John then comes to the station with a text from Leah, revealing that Stephen killed Susie. Peters and Cash intercept Stephen and Leah, and when Stephen tries to flee, Cash catches and arrests him. The character first appeared in the spin-off Home and Away: Revenge in 2016.
24 June	Cole	Barton Welch	A drug dealer who meets with Justin Morgan to sell him painkillers. Justin asks him if the pills are legit and Cole asks him if he wants them or not.
5 July	Lawyer Blaise	Martini Connelly	A lawyer sent by Tori Morgan when her brother Justin Morgan is brought in for further questioning about Susie McAllister's murder.
19 July	Alistair	Miritana Hughes	A gallery owner who hosts Bella Nixon and Emmett Ellison's photography exhibition. He greets Bella and asks her if the young man in her photos will be attending, but she tells him that he will not.
10 August	Ambulance Officer Luke	Lee Jones	The ambulance officers attend a car accident involving Nikau Parata, Mia Anderson and Dean Thompson. Luke is treating Nikau when Doctor Logan Bennett arrives, He informs Logan that Nikau has blurred vision, disoreientation and trouble breathing, and that there are two more injured people further down the hill. Nikau becomes hypoxic and passes out, so Logan orders Luke to load him up and go. Sarah greets Logan as she climbs out the car and tells him that Dean has a broken pelvis and is bleeding into his abdomen. He also has a laceration to the arm and she admits that he is not doing well. Logan asks her to get some morphine and fluids. Luke brings Nikau to Northern Districts Hospital, where they are greeted by Tori Morgan and Christian Green. Luke jokes about their formal attire before leaving. At the accident scene, Sarah assists Logan when Dean's condition worsens and he inserts a reboa catheter. In the ambulance, Tim tells Logan that Dean's blood pressure is dropping and he opens up another line.
10 August	Sarah	Kadee Hollis	
10 August	Ambulance Officer Tim	Damon Manns	
11 August 2021 – 14 August 2024, 22 January 2026	Nurse Jamie/Nurse Amy	Jazz Laker	The nurses assist Christian Green as he operates on Nikau Parata, who has a bleed on the brain.
11 August	Scout Nurse	Kate Bookallil	The nurses assist Christian Green as he operates on Nikau Parata, who has a bleed on the brain.
12 August 2021, 25 June 2022	Dr Jordan	Nisrine Amine	A doctor, who helps Christian Green during Nikau Parata's brain surgery. She monitors Nikau's blood pressure, which falls and rises as Christian tries to stop a bleed. The following year, she removes a sea urchin spine from the sole of Nikau's foot. She tells Naomi Stevens to wrap the foot and give Nikau some antibiotics. When Naomi asks about discharging him, Dr Jordan tells her to leave him overnight for observation.
18 August, 11 October	Nurse Sue	Fay Du Chateau	As the nurse checks Dean Thompson's blood pressure, he asks if she can do it later as he wants to speak with Ziggy Astoni, but she tells him that it will not take long. Weeks later, she helps treat victims of the organophosphate poisoning and brings Tane Parata's toxicology results to Doctor Logan Bennett.
19 August	Mrs Williams	Susan Boyd	Cash Newman and Felicity Newman's neighbour. Felicity accuses Mrs Williams of calling the landlord to evict them because she caught her husband looking at Felicity in the garden. Cash apologises to Mrs Williams before he goes inside the house.
25 August–1 September	Grant Finlayson	Kyle Barrett	A physiotherapist who helps Dean Thompson, who has a broken pelvis, to try and sit up, and leave his hospital bed. Grant praises Dean when he stands with crutches, but Dean shouts at Grant to stop touching him and asks him to leave. When Dean struggles to move from his chair to the bed, Grant explains that his body is still healing and that he will have good days and bad days. He advises him not to worry about his physio assessment and to get some rest. The following day, Grant takes Dean to his assessment, which he passes. Grant asks about his home, but when he learns that he lives above a shop, he tells Dean that he cannot go back there. He suggests a rehab centre or a continued stay in the hospital, until Ziggy Astoni says Dean can move in with her. Grant makes sure that Ziggy understands what she is taking on, including all of Dean's round-the-clock care, treatment and rehab.
26 August–9 November	Physio Clare	Sara Khan	A physiotherapist who helps Dean Thompson to take his first steps since his car accident. A few days later, Clare helps Dean into a wheelchair and they joke about him getting out of the hospital. Dean visits Clare for Physio and makes a remark about there being another happy customer when they overhear Marilyn Chambers berating Logan Bennett. Clare tells Dean that she will send him some new exercises.
26 August	Maria	Frances Berry	Logan Bennett brings Maria to Northern Districts after she has a fall. She is treated by Tori Morgan and Christian Green. Maria asks them not to call her fiancé until they know how bad her injuries are. Maria praises Logan and asks Tori to thank him for her.
31 August	Finnegan	Übai Dahoud	A young man who purchases Bella Nixon's camera from her on behalf of Nikau Parata, who he meets with outside The Diner for payment.
16 September	Dr Taylor	Charles Mayer	A London doctor who conducts a video interview with Tori Morgan, after being stalled by her brother Justin Morgan posing as her secretary.
23 September	Lizzy	Madison Croft	A girl on the beach, who tells Nikau Parata that she and her friend Kate follow him online and asks for a picture with him. He's initially hesitant, but John Palmer offers to take the pictures.
23–27 September	Wedding Celebrant	Michelle Doake	The celebrant marries Tori Morgan and Christian Green.
30 September–28 October	Anne Sherman	Megan Smart	A nightclub VIP hostess, who Felicity Newman introduces to Ryder Jackson, Chloe Anderson, Theo Poulos, Bella Nixon and Nikau Parata. Theo asks Anne to open some champagne to get the party started and she continues to serve drinks to the group throughout the night. Ryder gets drunk and repeatedly asks Anne to dance with him. She later tells him that she is cutting him off and Felicity checks if Anne is okay. Anne watches as Felicity goes over to warn Tane Parata to leave. When Tane attempts to get hold of Ryder to take him home, he insults Anne by calling her a nobody. Days later, Felicity tells Anne that Tane is in hospital due to organophosphate poisoning. She asks Anne to lie to the police for her because she does not have a good alibi, which Anne initially agrees to do. Anne protects Felicity when Nikau Parata becomes aggressive with her. Felicity sees Anne at the police station and Anne apologises, having not corroborated her story. They later meet up and Anne says she panicked because of the involvement of the federal police, but she did stand up for her. Anne later collects Felicity from the station and her brother Cash Newman thanks Anne for her help. Later, when Felicity mentions Tane, Anne says that he messed her around too. Felicity sees a social media post about a burnt receipt, something that only Anne could have overheard her discussing and she realises that Anne is behind everything. Anne taunts Felicity, telling her that she cannot prove anything. Days later, Anne comes to the Bay and talks with Jasmine Delaney about Felicity's disappearance. It soon emerges that she is holding Felicity hostage in an abandoned house in the bush. Anne visits Tane and tells him she knows where Felicity is. She drugs him, brings him to the house, tasers him and ties him up with Felicity. She plans to kill them both with organophosphate because she feels he has ignored and rejected her. Anne tells Felicity to write Cash a goodbye note, but Felicity refuses and stabs Anne in the leg with the pen. Anne tasers her and then sends Cash a text message instead. Cash and Ari Parata use the phone signal to find the house and stop Anne, who is then arrested by the police.
6 October	VIP Guest	Sam Mac	Sam Mac attends a fundraiser for mental health awareness at Salt in Summer Bay. He is greeted by Roo Stewart and Marilyn Chambers, who try to stall him, before Martha Stewart arrives. Roo later presents Sam with a cheque for $48,000.
7 October	Hazmat Team Leader O'Connell	Damien Strouthos	The hazmat team attend a large organophosphate poisoning at Salt. O'Connell informs Roo Stewart and John Palmer that they need to go through decontamination, before John gives O'Connell information about the surf club and the people upstairs in the restaurant. As they locate the source of the contamination in the nearby gym, the team find Tane Parata unconscious and bring him outside. They then start bringing out patrons of Salt, starting with Martha Stewart.
7 October	Hazmat Team Member Baxter	Danny Elacci	The hazmat team attend a large organophosphate poisoning at Salt. O'Connell informs Roo Stewart and John Palmer that they need to go through decontamination, before John gives O'Connell information about the surf club and the people upstairs in the restaurant. As they locate the source of the contamination in the nearby gym, the team find Tane Parata unconscious and bring him outside. They then start bringing out patrons of Salt, starting with Martha Stewart.
7 October	Committee Member Matt	Jackson Thomas	The committee member attends the mental health awareness fundraiser at Salt, and is hospitalised after suffering from organophosphate poisoning.
14–28 October	Detective Darren Nasser	Julian Maroun	A detective from the Australian Federal Police sent to investigate a organophosphate attack at the Surf Club, which specifically targeted Tane Parata. Senior constable Cash Newman shows him the crime scene at the gym and then introduces him to his sister Felicity Newman, who took out an AVO against Tane the day of the attack. Nasser asks to take her statement later that day. He brings Felicity to the station for questioning after meeting her again at the Diner. Cash later asks Nasser where he is at with the case, and Nasser tells him that they finally have a statement from Tane. He asks Cash for more information about the AVO Felicity took out on Tane. Cash says that Felicity is not behind the attack. Nasser brings Felicity in for a second interview after speaking with Anne Sherman, who has not corroborated her story. Felicity admits she was alone in her caravan the night of the attack, but makes it clear that she was not stalking Tane. Nasser later serves her a warrant to search her caravan and finds the sedatives that was used on Tane. Felicity tells Nasser that someone is targeting her and Tane. Cash later tells Nasser that Felicity believes Anne is behind the attack, just as Nasser is set to arrest Felicity for attempted murder. When they arrive at the caravan park, they find Felicity has gone. Nasser visits Tane to tell him that they tried to arrest Felicity, but she is on the run. Nasser believes Cash might have tipped Felicity off about the arrest, but he agrees to work with him to find her. Nasser later sees Cash leaving town and brings in his girlfriend Jasmine Delaney for a talk, but she cuts it short and leaves. Tane also disappears and Cash tells Nasser that Anne is responsible. Cash finds Felicity, Tane and Anne, who is arrested. Nasser takes their statements and praises Cash for his work.
14 October	Lissa	Ashleigh Rubenach	Two girls who book a surf lesson through Ben's Boards because Nikau Parata posted about it on his social media. They take photos with Nikau, but are disappointed when Ziggy Astoni arrives to take the lesson. Ziggy struggles to teach Lissa and Jess, as all they want to do is flirt with Nikau and take photos. Ziggy takes the girls into the surf, but Nikau has to rescue Lissa after she falls into the water and bumps her head.
14 October	Jess	Chiara Osborn	Two girls who book a surf lesson through Ben's Boards because Nikau Parata posted about it on his social media. They take photos with Nikau, but are disappointed when Ziggy Astoni arrives to take the lesson. Ziggy struggles to teach Lissa and Jess, as all they want to do is flirt with Nikau and take photos. Ziggy takes the girls into the surf, but Nikau has to rescue Lissa after she falls into the water and bumps her head.
1–9 November	Jake	Saksham Sharma	A young man taking John Palmer's Bronze Medallion training class. Nikau Parata asks Jake which page they are on when he gets lost. When John asks Nikau to get off his phone and tell him what he was just talking about, Nikau struggles and Jake answers John correctly. Jake later joins in laughing at Nikau's impression of John and takes a photo with him and the training dummy. Days later, John tells Jake that he has passed the assessment and was actually top of the class.
18 November	Father Neil	Matt Abercromby	The Chaplin visits Martha Stewart at her request while she is in hospital on dialysis. They talk alone and he later greets Roo Stewart on his way out.
22 November	Emma Pizzuti	Ursula Mills	A psychiatrist who talks with Roo Stewart about donating a kidney to her mother Martha Stewart. She asks how her family feels and how her relationship with Martha will be affected. Roo tells her that her father is worried. When she asks how Roo would feel if Martha suffers a complication Roo accuses Emma of being unsupportive, but Emma replies that she does not have an opinion she just wants Roo to consider all possible outcomes. She asks again about future complications, but Roo says she wants to focus on things she can control. They speak about Roo and Martha's relationship and how she thought Martha was dead because she faked her own death, which later led her to give her own baby away.
22 November	Max	Trey Daniels	A jogger who falls ill at the beach and has to be resuscitated by Nikau Parata. As he is being loaded into the ambulance, he thanks Nikau who gets a round of applause.
23 November	Surfer Mike	Helder Fernandes	A drunken Felicity Newman hangs out with Mike and his friend by their van, but they leave when Jasmine Delaney drags Felicity away and tells them she will call the police about their public drinking.
3–25 November	Matthew Montgomery	James Sweeny	Chloe Anderson's father. Matthew comes to Summer Bay Fit looking for Mia Anderson. As he leaves the surf club, Mia berates him for ignoring her no contact request. He tells her she owes him an explanation, as he knows she went through with the pregnancy and he wants to meet his child. Mia later meets with Matthew and he asks why she disappeared. She accidentally reveals that their child is a girl called Chloe, but she tells him that they do not need him. Matthew plans to leave the Bay, but he walks past Chloe the following day and gets her phone number from Irene Roberts when he enquires about her catering business. Matthew tells Mia that either she tells Chloe about him or he will. Mia then reveals that she has not told Chloe about him because he raped her the night she was conceived. Matthew says that he barely remembers that night, while Mia explains that she was drunk and did not give her consent. Days later, Matthew waits until Chloe is closing up the Pier Diner to reveal that he is her father. He tells her that he wants to be part of her life. Ari Parata introduces himself as Mia's partner and Chloe's step-father, before warning Matthew to stay away from them. Chloe meets with Matthew to get to know him. When Matthew overhears Chloe and Ryder Jackson arguing about their business, he offers to clear Chloe's debt, so she can buy Ryder out. Ari punches Matthew when he asserts that Chloe is his daughter and Ari cannot do anything about it. Mia yells at Matthew for how his presence is affecting her family. Matthew learns of Ari's criminal record and he blackmails Mia into letting Chloe get to know him by threatening to press charges against Ari. Chloe invites Matthew to dinner, but Mia leaves the table when Matthew lies about them dating. Matthew offers to pay for Chloe to attend a prestigious business school and suggests she move in with him. Mia tells Matthew to get out of her and Chloe's lives or she will tell Chloe the truth about her conception. Chloe later cuts off contact with Matthew, and when he turns up at the Diner to ask why, she reveals that she knows he raped Mia. Matthew confronts Chloe and is quick to anger when she points out what he did the night she was conceived, before telling him that she wants nothing to do with him. Matthew harasses Chloe outside her house, until Mia intervenes. When Matthew grabs Mia, Chloe hits him over the head with a brick, killing him. Mia then puts Matthew's body in the boot of her car and drives off, but is spotted speeding by Cash Newman, who discovers Matthew's body when he forces Mia to stop.
