= Return to Paradise (2024 TV series) =

2024 crime drama television series

- Genre: Comedy drama; Crime drama; Detective fiction
- Created by: James Hall; Peter Mattessi; Robert Thorogood
- Based on: Death in Paradise by Robert Thorogood
- Starring: Anna Samson; Lloyd Griffith; Tai Hara; Catherine McClements; Celia Ireland; Aaron McGrath; Andrea Demetriades; Jacob Collins-Levy
- Composers: Antony Partos; Jackson Milas
- Countries of origin: Australia; United Kingdom
- Original language: English
- No. of seasons: 3
- No. of episodes: 18

Production
- Executive producers: Rachel Okine; Brett Sleigh; Belinda Campbell; James Hall; Tim Key; Robert Thorogood; Warren Clarke; Peter Mattessi; Kylie Washington
- Producer: Diane Haddon
- Production location: New South Wales
- Running time: 60 minutes
- Production companies: Red Planet Pictures; BBC Studios Productions Australia

Original release
- Network: ABC
- Release: 8 September 2024 – present
- Network: BBC One (Note: All episodes of series 1 & 3 were released on BBC iPlayer, ahead of the first episode's premiere.)
- Release: 22 November 2024 – present

Related
- Death in Paradise; Beyond Paradise

Return to Paradise is an Australian-British crime comedy drama television series which aired its first season from 8 September to 13 October 2024 in Australia and from 22 November to 27 December 2024 in the UK. It is the second spin-off series of long-running crime series Death in Paradise and is led by Anna Samson as DI Mackenzie Clarke. On 21 November 2024, it was announced that a second series of the show was in development. On 17 April 2025, the series went into production for series two. ABC announced the second season would air from 15 November 2025. The international premiere is set for 31 October 2025 on BBC One. On 26 November 2025, ABC confirmed a third season was in development; production began in March 2026. The first episode will be shown internationally on BBC One on 6 November and all episodes are available on bbc iplayer On 21 October 2026, the ABC announced during their Upfronts that the series had been renewed for a fourth season.

The series won the Silver Logie for Best Drama Program at the Logie Awards of 2025, with Samson, Tai Hara and Lloyd Griffith receiving nominations for their roles.

== Premise ==
Australian-born Detective Inspector Mackenzie Clarke works for London's Metropolitan Police as the series starts. She returns to her home town of Dolphin Cove to help fix up her mother's house, but ends up temporarily re-joining the local police team to help them solve a murder. When her return to London is delayed by allegations of evidence tampering, she is forced to remain indefinitely. Complicating her new position is the fact that one of her co-workers is her former fiancé whom she left at the altar years earlier, and her boss is her would-have-been mother-in-law.

== Cast and characters ==
=== Main ===
- Anna Samson as Detective Sergeant (initially Detective Inspector from New Scotland Yard) Mackenzie "Mack" Clarke
- Lloyd Griffith as Detective Senior Constable Colin Cartwright
- Tai Hara as Glenn Strong, Mackenzie's former fiancé
- Catherine McClements as Senior Sergeant Philomena Strong, Mackenzie's boss and Glenn's mother
- Celia Ireland as Reggie Rocco, a volunteer at the police station, and a former teacher of Mackenzie
- Aaron L. McGrath as Senior Constable Felix Wilkinson
- Andrea Demetriades as Daisy Dixon, Glenn's girlfriend (series 1–2)
- Jacob Collins-Levy as Forensic Pathologist Leo Drake, the new Forensic Pathologist after Glenn’s departure (series 3)

=== Recurring guests ===
- Genevieve Lemon as Madge Woodburne
- Ron Smyck as Trevor Bongiovanni
- Anarchy as Frankie the Dog
- Ardal O'Hanlon as Detective Inspector Jack Mooney, Mackenzie's boss in London (previously a central protagonist in Death in Paradise)
- Kerry Armstrong as Jillian Clarke, Mackenzie’s mother (series 3)

== Plot ==
Mackenzie Clarke, a DI from the London Metropolitan Police, returns to Dolphin Cove after years of being away in London. While she waits to hear what is happening to her career in England after she is accused of evidence tampering and with no clear idea on what she will do next, she is given a chance by Philomena, the police sergeant in charge of the police station. Mackenzie is thrown in to investigate several murders that happen and she uses her skills as a detective to bring the killers to justice.

Mackenzie reunites with several people from her past, including Glenn, her ex that she was set to marry. The two work together to solve crimes and bring killers to justice as Glenn has moved forward with Daisy, Mackenzie must remain focused on solving the most difficult of cases.

In series two, Mackenzie delays her return home to the UK and goes back to Dolphin Cove to the surprise of the entire station. After hearing Glenn's admission that he still has feelings for Mackenzie she is torn, as Glenn and Daisy are set to be married she realises that her feelings for him are still strong. With new murder cases to solve, Mackenzie keeps busy solving the most difficult crimes and knowing her feeling for Glenn could get her in trouble.

== Location ==
The series is primarily filmed in the Illawarra region of New South Wales, Australia.

== Episodes ==
Series	Episodes	Originally released		UK Viewers (millions)
Series	Episodes	First released	Last released	UK Viewers (millions)
1	6	8 September 2024	27 September 2024	3.82
2	6	15 November 2025	15 November 2025	3.18
3	6	6 November 2026	TBA	TBA

=== Season 1 (2024) ===
No.	Title	Directed by	Written by	Original release date	UK air date	Australia viewers (millions)	UK Viewers (million)
1	"R.I.P. Tide"	Mat King	Peter Mattessi	8 September 2024	22 November 2024	0.838	4.32
DI Mackenzie Clarke returns to her Australian hometown of Dolphin Cove in disgrace after being accused of falsifying evidence in London, where she faces scorn from her old acquaintances as well, due to her career change leading her to abandon her fiancé Glenn Strong at the altar. Meanwhile, real estate agent Stuart Granger is found stabbed to death on the beach during a surf carnival, when he was last seen with a prospective client at a vacant house kilometers away, with security footage showing no one else who could have been able to kill him. Mackenzie must swallow her pride and work with Glenn, a forensic pathologist, and her other old colleagues to solve this impossible crime.
2	"Dead Last"	Mat King	Peter Mattessi	15 September 2024	29 November 2024	0.799	3.87
Just before he participates in the Dolphin Cove fun run, entrepreneur Curtis Faleafar calls Mackenzie to warn her that many lives are in danger. At the end of the race, Curtis collapses and dies from poisoning, and Mackenzie is convinced his warning had some connection to his death. The problem is that the poison was only found on a single cup out of all the cups discarded at the fun run's drink station, leaving Mackenzie puzzled: if the killer wanted to kill many people, why not poison all the cups, and if Curtis was targeted specifically, how did the killer ensure he drank from the poisoned cup?
3	"Curl Up and Dye"	Mat King	Elizabeth Coleman	22 September 2024	6 December 2024	0.745	3.84
Hairdresser Bianca Bailey is found strangled to death in her locked beauty salon, with no evidence of a break-in. All of Bianca’s colleagues have keys, but they each have a rock-solid alibi, and two of them saw Bianca alive before they left. Mackenzie is faced with a classic locked-room murder, but discovers that someone she knows may have the key to solving the case.
4	"Killer Climate"	Tenika Smith	Alexandra Collier	27 September 2024	13 December 2024	0.740	3.85
Activist Byron Jones is mysteriously bludgeoned to death whilst chained to an excavator with his group as part of a protest. Mackenzie’s investigation soon finds her in a dilemma; of the four suspects, three of them were chained to the excavator with the victim and were unable to kill him, while the one person who was able to commit the murder has no motive to do so.
5	"Dead Bowl"	Tenika Smith	Kodie Bedford	27 September 2024	20 December 2024	0.551	3.43
During the Bushranger's Bowl, pariah Artie O’Farrell accuses home team captain Ted Haddon of cheating, causing a suspended game, and Artie is later found shot to death on the green, with a gun that was on display in the club. There are four people who could have done the deed: Ted, his wife Helen, their son Mal, and Rita, Helen’s elderly mother and the club president. However, Senior Sergeant Philomena Strong was also present and confirms all the suspects were far away from the green when the gunshot went off and thus none of them had time to kill Artie, and what's more, the murder weapon was still on the wall. Despite this, Mackenzie discovers the family all had the same 40-year-old motive for wanting Artie dead, but must now figure out how both the killer and the weapon could have been in two places at once.
6	"Oh Mine Papa"	Tenika Smith	Peter Mattessi	27 September 2024	27 December 2024	0.697	3.63
Vincent Ogden is found dead in his warehouse, and all signs point to suicide: the door was bolted from the inside and everyone who might have wanted him dead has a solid alibi. However, Mackenzie uncovers some dirty family secrets that put a new spin on the case and soon suspects she’s looking for a killer rather than a motive for suicide.

=== Season 2 (2025) ===
No.	Title	Directed by	Written by	Original release date	UK air date	Australia viewers (millions)	UK Viewers (million)
1	"Apex Predator"	Tenika Smith	Peter Mattessi	15 November 2025	31 October 2025	N/A	4.38
A scientist working at a shark research lab is found dead on a runaway boat. Mack suspects the death is a meticulously planned murder.
2	"Killer Set"	Tenika Smith	Alexandra Cullen	15 November 2025	7 November 2025	N/A	3.07
A rock star is murdered in a locked theatre, forcing Mack to uncover the truth hidden in the band’s decades-old history.
3	"Death Trip"	Tenika Smith	Alexandra Collier	15 November 2025	21 November 2025	N/A	2.90
A CEO is poisoned during a spiritual ceremony at a corporate retreat, but the killer’s method defies explanation.
4	"Checking Out"	Helena Brooks	Chelsea Cassio	15 November 2025	28 November 2025	N/A	2.87
When Colin's friends visit from England, one of them wakes up to find a stranger's corpse in his locked motel room, with no sign of how the killer got out.
5	"Chapter One: Murder"	Helena Brooks	Marisa Nathar	15 November 2025	5 December 2025	N/A	2.92
A crime writer is found stabbed to death in his villa after announcing his controversial comeback book at a literary festival, but all of the suspects were on stage at the time of the murder.
6	"Til Death Do Us Part"	Helena Brooks	Peter Mattessi	15 November 2025	12 December 2025	N/A	2.95
Mack interrupts Glenn and Daisy's wedding when an uninvited guest collapses, poisoned by a seemingly random wedding program. But by halting the wedding, has she finally pushed Glenn too far?

=== Season 3 (2026) ===
No.	Title	Directed by	Written by	Original release date	UK air date	Australia viewers (millions)	UK Viewers (million)
1	"Stilled Life"	Tenika Smith	Peter Mattessi	14 November 2026	6 November 2026	TBD	TBA
When an artist is murdered during an avant-garde performance piece for the Dolphin Cove art fair, Mackenzie must use her expertise to find the killer.
2	"Built to Kill"	Tenika Smith	Alexandra Cullen	14 November 2026	6 November 2026	TBD	TBA
A builder falls to his death from a construction site roof. What looks like a tragic accident turns out to be murder. But how did the killer do it when the victim was on the roof alone?
3	"The Final Shot"	Tenika Smith	Alexandra Cullen	14 November 2026	20 November 2026	TBD	TBA
The anniversary screening of a cult film turns deadly when a key figure is found shot dead. But how did the killer fire the gun unnoticed by the packed audience?
4	"Buried Past"	Helena Brooks	Marisa Nathar	14 November 2026	27 November 2026	TBD	TBA
Human remains are uncovered in the concrete by the local ocean pool. How could that be possible when the victim had already left town before the concrete was poured 43 years ago?
5	"Animal Instinct"	Helena Brooks	Sam Meikle	14 November 2026	TBA	TBD	TBA
A wildlife park worker is stabbed with their ornamental cassowary claw in a cassowary enclosure. The victim was the only one to access the cage, so how did the killer escape?
6	"Vote One Murder"	Helena Brooks	Peter Mattessi	14 November 2026	TBA	TBD	TBA
The votes aren't rigged, but when an election candidate is poisoned, it's the other candidates that are suspected. But how did the killer know just what they would eat?

== Awards and nominations ==
Year	Award	Nominee	Category	Result	Ref
2025	Logie Awards	Return to Paradise	Best Drama Program	Won	
2025	Logie Awards	Tai Hara	Best Lead Actor	Nominated	
2025	Logie Awards	Lloyd Griffith	Best Lead Actor	Nominated	
2025	Logie Awards	Anna Samson	Best Lead Actress	Nominated	
