= Nancy Knudsen =

Australian actress and journalist

- Born: 1940 (age 85–86); Mareeba, Queensland, Australia
- Occupations: TV announcer, actress, businesswoman, and journalist

Nancy Knudsen (born 1940) is an Australian retired TV announcer, actress, businesswoman, and journalist. She was named Miss Queensland in 1959 and received the Logie award for the most popular female personality in Queensland in 1961.

== Early life and education ==
Knudsen was born in Mareeba, Queensland, Australia. She then completed her Master of Arts in Writing and Literature at Deakin University.

== Career ==
Knudsen started her career after receiving the title of Miss Queensland in 1959 as a TV announcer and producer at the BTQ Channel 7 in Brisbane.

In 1963, she left the position and started acting, and her acting credits include Homicide (1964), Skippy (1969), Color me Dead (1969), and Wake in Fright (1971).

In 1976, she started a travel company called Sydney Express, the first of several travel agencies and later sold. In 1984, Nancy founded Air cruising Australia and Bill Peach Tours, and became the only living female chair of a public company in Australia.

In 2003, Knudsen started sailing around the world with her husband, Ted Nobbs, on a 46ft yacht, returning to Australia in 2008.

In 2011, she became a councillor of Dungog Shire and later became Mayor in 2017.

== Recognition ==
Knudsen became Miss Queensland in 1959 and received the Logie award for the most popular female personality in Queensland in 1961. Knudsen was one of the finalists for Miss Australia in 1959. Knudsen received the Telstra Business Owner of the Year award for developing and branding her company, Knudsen Enterprises, in 1998. In 2007, she received a Seamanship Award from the Ocean Cruising Club of Australia and won a Cruising Trophy for the 2011 Cruising Yacht Club of Australia.

== Publications ==
- 2011: Shooting Stars and Flying Fish.
- 2013: Accidentally Istanbul.
