= Sean Keenan (actor) =

Australian actor (born 1993)

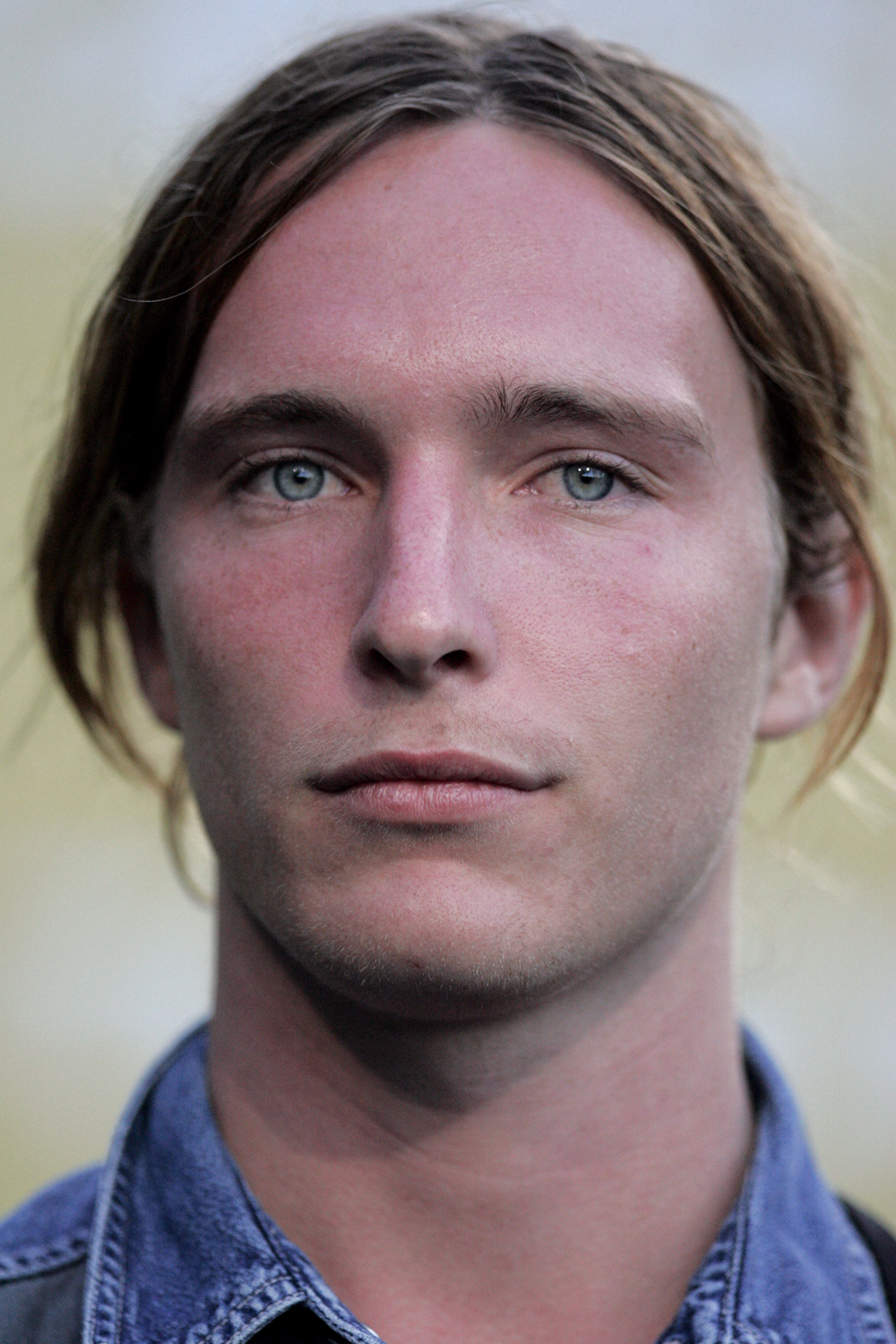
- Keenan at the Tropfest 2013
- Born: Sean Martyn Rex Keenan; 18 January 1993 (age 33); Busselton, Western Australia, Australia
- Occupation: Actor
- Years active: 2007–present

Sean Martyn Rex Keenan (born 18 January 1993) is an Australian actor, best known for his titular role in the children's television series Lockie Leonard and for his role as Gary Hennessey in the television series Puberty Blues.

== Early life ==
Keenan was born and grew up in the Western Australian town of Busselton. He was in grade seven, when his school sent him to audition for Lockie Leonard, with no prior on-screen experience – a role he won. After this, he secured an agent, finished school, took a year off, and then relocated to Sydney to further his acting career.

== Career ==
Keenan's breakthrough role came in the form of the title character in television series Lockie Leonard from 2007 to 2010.

In 2011, Keenan appeared in several recurring television roles, including Cloudstreet (2011) as Ted Pickles and Dance Academy (2013) as Jamie. He held a regular role as Gary Hennessey in the television reimagining of Puberty Blues from 2012 to 2014. Another regular role as Charlie on Glitch followed from 2015 to 2019.

He played Justin Morrison in 2016 series Shit Creek, a young Paul Hogan in miniseries Hoges: The Paul Hogan Story and Johnny Allbright in miniseries Newton's Law (both 2017). Keenan played the lead role of teacher John Grant in the 2017 miniseries reimagining of cult hit thriller film Wake in Fright, which garnered him an AACTA nomination.

Further miniseries credits include Barons (2022), Bali 2002 (2022) and Exposure (2024) as well as mystery thriller series No Escape (2023).

Keenan has also appeared in numerous films, including 2013 surf drama Drift as Young Andy Kelly (opposite Sam Worthington), 2015 mystery thriller Strangerland as Steve (alongside Nicole Kidman) and 2019 bushranger film True History of the Kelly Gang as Joe Byrne (opposite Russell Crowe). He played Jamie in multi-award-winning 2021 film Nitram, based on mass-shooter Martin Bryant and the Port Arthur Massacre. That same year, he played Sven in Academy Award-winning film The Power of the Dog.

== Filmography ==
=== Theatre ===
Year	Title	Role	Notes
2019	Cosi	Lewis	MTC / STC
2023	Death of a Salesman	Happy Loman	5 Minute Call Pty Ltd

=== Film ===
Year	Title	Role	Notes
2013	Drift	Young Andy Kelly	
2013	Breathe	Rowan	Short
2015	Strangerland	Steve Robertson	
2015	Is This the Real World	Mark	
2016	Hard Target 2	Tobias Zimling	Direct-to-video
2017	Australia Day	Dean Patterson	
2019	True History of the Kelly Gang	Joe Byrne	
2020	Jake's 7th Birthday	Jake	Short
2021	The Power of the Dog	Sven	
2021	Nitram	Jamie	
2025	One More Shot	Joe	
TBA	Play Dead	TBA	Post-production

=== Television ===
Year	Title	Role	Notes	Ref
2007–2010	Lockie Leonard	Lachlan 'Lockie' Leonard	Main role, 52 episodes	
2011	Cloudstreet	Ted Pickles	Miniseries, 3 episodes	
2012–2014	Puberty Blues	Gary Hennessey	Main role, 17 episodes	
2013	Dance Academy	Jamie	Recurring role, 5 episodes	
2015–2019	Glitch	Charlie Thompson	Main role, 18 episodes	
2015	Shit Creek	Justin Morrison	Miniseries	
2016	Hunters	Pablo	Episode: "Pretending to See the Future"	
2016	Hoges: The Paul Hogan Story	Young Paul Hogan	Miniseries, 1 episode	
2017	Newton's Law	Johnny Allbright	Miniseries, supporting role, 8 episodes	
2017	Wake in Fright	John Grant	Miniseries, main role, 2 episodes	
2022	Barons	Bill 'Trotter' Dwyer	Miniseries, main role, 8 episodes	
2022	Bali 2002	Jason McCartney	Miniseries, 4 episodes	
2023	No Escape	Denny	7 episodes	
2024	Exposure	Raffa	Miniseries, 5 episodes	
