= Hoges: The Paul Hogan Story =

Australian television miniseries

- Genre: Bio Drama
- Written by: Keith Thompson; Marieke Hardy
- Directed by: Kevin Carlin
- Starring: Josh Lawson; Justine Clarke; Ryan Corr; Laura Gordon; Nikki Osborne; Sean Keenan; Marny Kennedy
- Country of origin: Australia
- Original language: English

Production
- Executive producer: Jo Porter
- Production company: FremantleMedia Australia

Original release
- Network: Seven Network
- Release: 12 February – 19 February 2017

Hoges: The Paul Hogan Story is a two-part Australian miniseries based on Australian actor and comedian Paul Hogan which premiered on 12 February and concluded on 19 February 2017.

== Plot ==
Based on the real Paul Hogan, a blue-collar worker who married at 18 with five kids, went on a talent contest New Faces as a dare from workmates and ended up opening the door to a unanticipated new life.

== Production ==
The series was announced in November 2015 with filming expected to be filmed in 2016, in December 2015, it was announced casting was underway and Kevin Carlin would direct the series with Keith Thompson and Marieke Hardy as lead writers. In May 2016, the cast for the series was announced with actor Josh Lawson taking on the role of Paul Hogan. Production for the series first began in May 2016 with filming taking place in Brisbane, the series is being funded by Screen Queensland.

== Cast ==
- Josh Lawson as Paul Hogan
  - Sean Keenan as Young Paul
- Justine Clarke as Noelene Hogan
  - Marny Kennedy as Young Noelene
- Ryan Corr as John Cornell
- Laura Gordon as Linda Kozlowski
- Nikki Osborne as Delvene Delaney
- Bernard Curry as Mike Willesee
- Piéra Forde as Loren Hogan
- Lydia Mocerino as Jenny Hogan
- Chris Bartholomew as Wal
- Cameron Caulfield as Clag Hogan
- Vanessa Buckley as Alice
- Connor Zegenhagen as Michael
- John Adam
- Rupert Reid

== Reception ==
=== Viewership ===
Episode	Air date	Timeslot	Viewers (millions)	Nightly rank	Consolidated Viewers (millions)	Adjusted rank	Source
"Part 1"	12 February 2017	Sunday 8:30pm	0.837	#6	0.973	#5	
"Part 2"	19 February 2017	Sunday 8:30pm	0.839	#6	0.960	#4	
