= Wake in Fright =

1971 film by Ted Kotcheff

- Australian daybill film poster
- Directed by: Ted Kotcheff
- Screenplay by: Evan Jones (Note: Throughout principal photography, Kotcheff reworked parts of the script without receiving a credit.)
- Based on: Wake in Fright by Kenneth Cook
- Produced by: George Willoughby
- Starring: Donald Pleasence; Gary Bond; Chips Rafferty; Sylvia Kay
- Cinematography: Brian West
- Edited by: Anthony Buckley
- Music by: John Scott
- Color process: Technicolor
- Production companies: NLT Productions; Group W Films
- Distributed by: United Artists
- Release dates: 13 May 1971 (Cannes); 22 July 1971 (Paris); 8 October 1971 (Sydney); 15 September 1971 (Detroit)
- Running time: 109 minutes
- Countries: Australia; United Kingdom; United States
- Language: English
- Budget: A$700,000–800,000
- Box office: $321,323 (Australia re-release); $50,394 (US re-release)

Wake in Fright (initially released as Outback outside Australia) is a 1971 psychological thriller film directed by Ted Kotcheff, written by Evan Jones, and starring Gary Bond, Donald Pleasence, Chips Rafferty, Sylvia Kay, and Jack Thompson. Based on Kenneth Cook's 1961 novel of the same name, it follows a young schoolteacher who descends into personal moral degradation after finding himself stranded in a brutal, menacing town in outback Australia.

Filmed on-location in Broken Hill and Sydney, Wake in Fright was an international co-production between Australia, Britain, and the United States. Alongside Walkabout, it was one of two Australian films to be nominated for the Grand Prix du Festival at the 24th Cannes Film Festival. Despite attracting positive reviews at the time, the film was a commercial failure in Australia, in part due to scant marketing by United Artists, as well as controversy surrounding its portrayal of outback life, including a hunting scene in which real kangaroos are shot and killed.

By the 1990s, Wake in Fright had developed a cult reputation as Australia's great "lost film" because its master negative had gone missing, resulting in censored prints of degraded quality being used for its few television broadcasts and VHS releases. After the original film and sound elements were rescued by editor Anthony Buckley in 2004, the film was digitally remastered and given a 2009 re-release at Cannes and in Australian theatres to widespread acclaim; it was issued commercially on DVD and Blu-ray later that year. Wake in Fright is now considered a pivotal film of both the Australian New Wave and the Ozploitation cycle, earning praise from contemporary critics for Kotcheff's direction and the cast's performances.

Wake in Fright was remade as a two-part miniseries that aired in 2017.

== Plot ==
John Grant is a young, middle-class schoolteacher who feels disgruntled because of the onerous terms of an employment bond that he signed with the government in return for receiving a tertiary education. The bond has forced him to accept a two-year post at a tiny school at Tiboonda, a remote township in the arid outback. It is the start of the Christmas holidays, and John plans on going to Sydney to see his girlfriend Robyn, but first he must travel by train to the nearby mining town of Bundanyabba – affectionately nicknamed "The Yabba" by the locals – in order to catch a Sydney-bound flight.

Upon arriving at The Yabba, John goes to a pub. There he meets the local policeman, Jock Crawford, who befriends him after both drink repeated glasses of beer, first at the pub and then at an RSL club, where they witness an unnerving ANZAC memorial service. Crawford then introduces him to the illegal game of two-up, and to Clarence "Doc" Tydon, a vagrant, alcoholic medical practitioner who questions John's contemptuous view of The Yabba and its populace.

Deciding to try his luck at two-up, John has a winning streak but becomes reckless: in a desperate bid to win enough money to pay off his bond, he loses all of his cash in two rounds. This results in John becoming stranded in The Yabba with no money, leaving him at the mercy of its searing heat and eccentric but sinister townsfolk.

While drinking, John becomes friends with a resident named Tim Hynes and goes to Tim's house, where he meets his adult daughter, Janette, and his two friends, miners Dick and Joe. Tim, Dick and Joe engage in an all-day drinking session, where they are eventually joined by Doc. John converses with Janette, who quietly desires a life outside of waiting on her father and his friends. She aggressively tries to seduce John, who vomits partly in disgust and due to the beer he has ingested.

After engaging in more debauched rituals with the Hynes and their guests, John finds refuge in Doc's isolated shack. After providing him with medicine to cure his hangover and feeding him on kangaroo meat, Doc expounds his worldview onto John, revealing that his alcoholism and self-sufficient attitude to life prevented him from practicing in Sydney. He also reveals that he and Janette have had a long-standing open relationship punctuated by unorthodox sexual encounters.

John and Doc are joined by Dick and Joe in a drunken, barbaric kangaroo hunt that lasts into the night, which culminates in Joe engaging in fisticuffs with one such kangaroo and John clumsily stabbing another to death. The four then vandalize a bush pub, where Dick and Joe engage in a playful fight that turns brutal, interrupting Doc as he lectures an unconscious John about the violent nature of civilization despite its philosophical and materialistic trappings. At dawn, John returns to Doc's shack, where Doc initiates an apparent homosexual encounter between the two.

Repulsed, John leaves that morning and returns to town, where his two suitcases, left behind at a hotel after he met Tim, are returned to him by Crawford. After discarding one suitcase – mostly containing textbooks, including one on Plato – he wanders through the desert towards Sydney, hitch-hiking with truck drivers where possible and procuring food using the rifle he was given during the hunt. He eventually arrives at a truck stop, where he persuades a driver he assumes is heading for Sydney to give him a lift. However, due to miscommunication, John returns to The Yabba instead.

Enraged with Doc and his perversity, John rushes to his empty cabin, intent on shooting him upon his return. However, he becomes overwhelmed with loneliness and remorse, and turns his rifle on himself. Doc arrives to witness John shoot himself in the temple, the impact of which scars but fails to kill him.

John recovers in the hospital and signs a statement from Crawford explaining that his suicide attempt was an accident. Several weeks later, Doc takes him to the railway station, where they quietly make peace with each other. No longer contemptuous of the outback's inhabitants and more assured of himself, John accepts the offer of a beer from other passengers on the train and returns to Tiboonda to begin the new school year.

== Cast ==
- Gary Bond as John Grant
- Donald Pleasence as Clarence F. "Doc" Tydon
- Chips Rafferty as Jock Crawford
- Sylvia Kay as Janette Hynes
- Jack Thompson as Dick
- Peter Whittle as Joe
- Al Thomas as Tim Hynes
- John Meillon as Charlie
- John Armstrong as Atkins, cab driver
- Slim De Grey as Jarvis, two-up player
- Maggie Dence as the hotel receptionist
- Norman Erskine as Joe, cook at two-up school
- Buster Fiddess as Charlie Jones, two-up Spinner
- Tex Foote as Stubbs, bush publican
- Nancy Knudsen as Robyn, John's girlfriend
- Dawn Lake as Joyce, barmaid
- Bob McDarra as Pig Eyes, truck driver
- Jacko Jackson as Morley, van driver

== Production ==
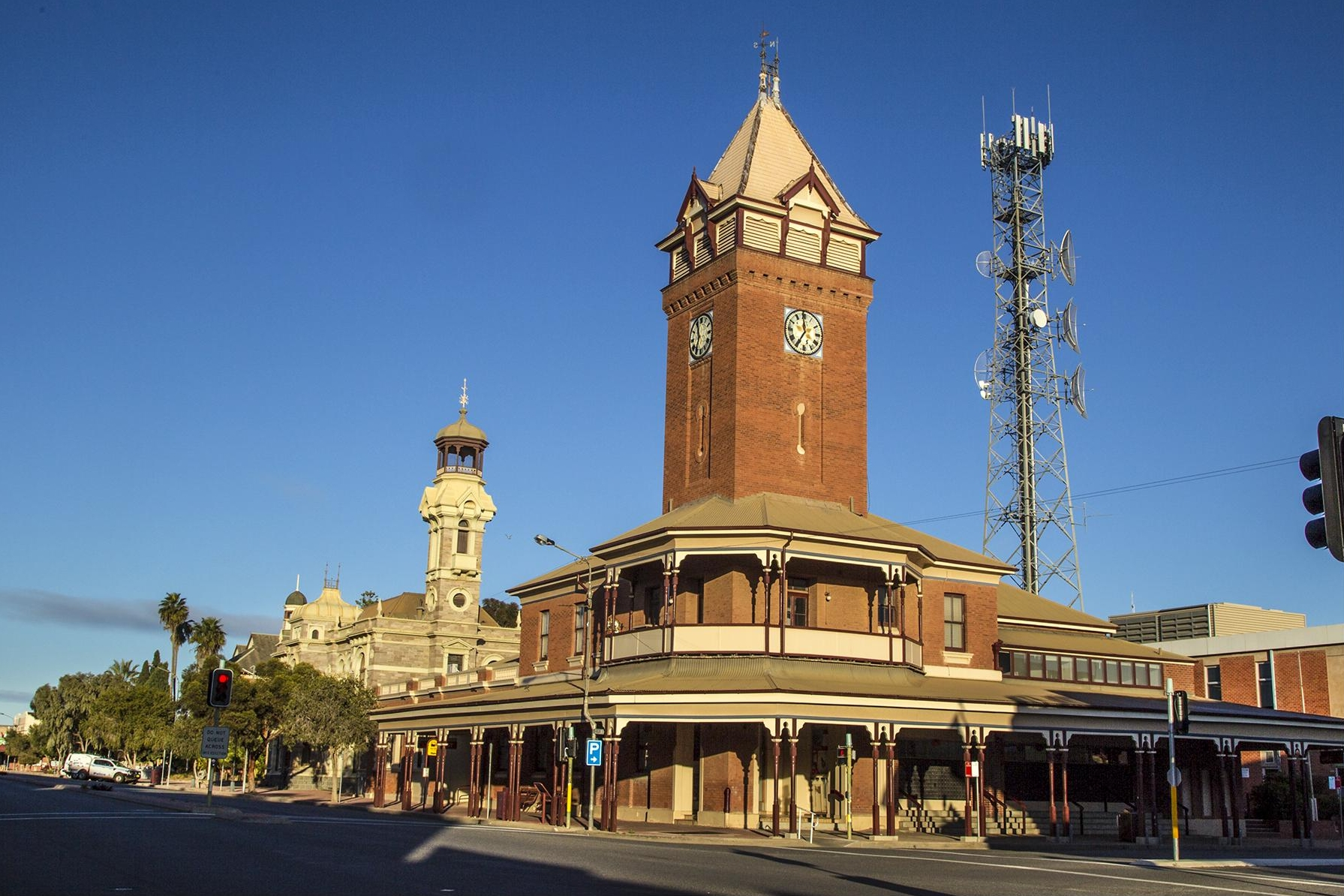
Bundanyabba is a "thinly disguised portrait" of Broken Hill, where much of the film was shot.

A film adaptation of Kenneth Cook's 1961 novel Wake in Fright was linked with the actor Dirk Bogarde and director Joseph Losey as early as 1963. Morris West later secured the film rights and tried, unsuccessfully, to raise funding for the film's production. The rights were eventually bought by Australian company NLT Productions and American firm Group W Films and Canadian director Ted Kotcheff was recruited to direct the film. As stated by writer Stephen Vagg, "the first masterpiece of the revived Australian film industry" was "directed by a Canadian, from a script by a Jamaican, with a Norwegian producer and finance from an American fridge manufacturer."

After Wake in Fright, Kotcheff would continue to have a successful career as a director. His later films included The Apprenticeship of Duddy Kravitz (1973), Fun with Dick and Jane (1977), First Blood (1982) and Weekend at Bernie's (1988). Robert Helpmann was initially hired to play the role of Doc Tydon, but he was replaced with Donald Pleasence due to scheduling conflicts. Actor Michael York stated in a 1980 interview that he turned down a role in the film due to being offended by the kangaroo hunting scene.

The shooting of Wake in Fright began in January 1970 in the mining town of Broken Hill, (the area which had inspired Cook for the setting of his novel), with interiors shot the next month at Ajax Studios in the Sydney beach-side suburb of Bondi. It was the last film to feature the veteran character actor Chips Rafferty, who died of a heart attack prior to Wake in Fright's release, and an early film with Jack Thompson, a future Australian cinema star, among its cast members.

== Film copyright issue ==
In 2018, a copyright dispute arose after Debbie Limb claimed she owned half of the film rights, as her father, Bobby Limb, co-owned the film's production company NLT Productions. However, there was no existing documentation of a legal contract. It had been stipulated that revenue earned from the film be put into a trust fund to support the Australian film industry.

== Release ==
The world premiere of Wake in Fright (as Outback) occurred on opening night of the 1971 Cannes Film Festival on 13 May. Ted Kotcheff was nominated for a Golden Palm Award. Internationally, the film opened commercially in the United Kingdom on 29 October 1971 and the United States on 20 February 1972.

When the film was re-released in Australia on 25 June 2009, it grossed $62,393 in its opening weekend, and eventually earned $321,323. The film made $50,394 during a 2012 re-release in the United States. It was also screened in Japan, among other revival markets.

== Reception ==
Wake in Fright found a favourable public response in France, where it ran for five months, and in the United Kingdom. However, despite receiving such critical support at Cannes and in Australia, Wake in Fright suffered poor domestic box-office returns. Although there were complaints that the film's distributor, United Artists, had failed to promote the film successfully, it was also thought that the film was "perhaps too uncomfortably direct and uncompromising to draw large Australian audiences". During an early Australian screening, one man stood up, pointed at the screen and protested "That's not us!", to which Jack Thompson yelled back "Sit down, mate. It is us."

In his 1972 review for The New York Times, Roger Greenspun praised the film for its atmosphere "of general foreboding that crystalizes often enough into particular terror and that is not quite like anything else I can remember feeling at the movies. Certain science-fiction films come closest to it, especially those in which some evil alien presence has taken over a community that to all outward appearances remains normal—with only the slightest most fugitive hint that something somehow is hideously wrong"; he also admitted to finding the memorial service at the RSL club to be more disturbing than the kangaroo hunting sequences, and praised the performances of the cast, particularly Kay and Thomas.

A review of the Cannes premiere in Variety called it "a creditable effort" from the Australian film industry, "even allowing for the fact that key technical and acting credits are British. The end result is a forceful glimpse of little-known territory in which the emphasis is on booze and violence, with a touch of sex for good measure." Gillian Hanson of The Monthly Film Bulletin wrote, "Canadian director Ted Kotcheff has captured the mindless brutality of life in the outback with extraordinary felicity ... Yet, despite its unmistakable competence, the film's bite is blunted by the script's shallow and largely unmotivated characterisation of John Grant, and by the loosely-knit and over-melodramatic story line which never achieves thematic coherence."

The unrestored version of Wake in Fright received a three stars (out of four) rating from the American film reviewer Leonard Maltin in his 2006 Movie Guide, while Brian McFarlane, writing in 1999 in The Oxford Companion to Australian Film, said that it was "almost uniquely unsettling in the history of new Australian Cinema". Askmen.com echoed these sentiments, citing that "it's not hard to see why the dusty savagery and clown-faced surrealism of Ted Kotcheff's fourth feature was never shown on telly at the time."

Following the film's restoration, Wake in Fright screened at the 2009 Cannes Film Festival on 15 May 2009 when it was selected as a Cannes Classic title by the head of the department, Martin Scorsese. Wake in Fright is one of only two films ever to screen twice in the history of the festival. Scorsese said, "Wake in Fright is a deeply -- and I mean deeply -- unsettling and disturbing movie. I saw it when it premiered at Cannes in 1971, and it left me speechless. Visually, dramatically, atmospherically and psychologically, it's beautifully calibrated and it gets under your skin one encounter at a time, right along with the protagonist played by Gary Bond. I'm excited that Wake in Fright has been preserved and restored and that it is finally getting the exposure it deserves."

Roger Ebert reviewed the re-release and said "It's not dated. It is powerful, genuinely shocking and rather amazing. It comes billed as a 'horror film' and contains a great deal of horror, but all of the horror is human and brutally realistic." Don Groves of SBS gave the film four stars out of five, claiming that "Wake in Fright deserves to rank as an Australian classic as it packs enormous emotional force, was bravely and inventively directed, and features superb performances."

American critic Rex Reed, an early advocate of Wake in Fright, praised the film's restoration as "the best movie news of the year", and said it "may be the greatest Australian film ever made". According to Australian musician and screenwriter Nick Cave, it is "the best and most terrifying film about Australia in existence." Stephen Vagg argued for InReview that "the thing often not appreciated about Wake in Fright is that most of the people Grant encounters are trying to be nice... This snobbish Baby Boomer is too good for the people he encounters or things they do but he doesn’t have the courage of his prejudices to avoid them."

The film has an approval rating of 97% and a rating average score of 8.6/10 on the review aggregator website Rotten Tomatoes, based on 59 reviews. The site's consensus states: "A disquieting classic of Australian cinema, Wake in Fright surveys a landscape both sun-drenched and ruthlessly dark." On Metacritic, the film holds a score of 85 out of 100 based on reviews from 21 critics, indicating "universal acclaim". Wake in Fright is also listed in the 2015 edition of the film reference book 1001 Movies You Must See Before You Die.

== Controversy ==
In addition to the film's atmosphere of sordid realism, the kangaroo hunting scene contains genuine graphic footage of kangaroos being shot. A disclaimer at the conclusion of the movie states:

PRODUCERS' NOTE

The hunting scenes depicted in this film were taken during an actual kangaroo hunt by professional licensed hunters.

For this reason and because the survival of the Australian kangaroo is seriously threatened, these scenes were shown uncut after consultation with the leading animal welfare organisations in Australia and the United Kingdom.

— Quoted from the movie credits.

The hunt lasted several hours, and gradually wore down the filmmakers. According to cinematographer Brian West, "the hunters were getting really drunk and they started to miss, ... It was becoming this orgy of killing and we [the crew] were getting sick of it." Kangaroos hopped about helplessly with gun wounds and trailing intestines. Producer George Willoughby fainted after seeing a kangaroo "splattered in a particularly spectacular fashion". The crew orchestrated a power failure in order to end the hunt.

At the 2009 Cannes Classic screening of Wake in Fright, 12 people walked out during the kangaroo hunt.

Kotcheff, a vegetarian, defended his use of the hunting footage in the film.

== Restoration and home-media releases ==
For many years, the only known print of Wake in Fright, found in Dublin, was considered of insufficient quality for transfer to DVD or videotape for commercial release. In response to this situation, Wake in Fright's editor, Anthony Buckley, began to search in 1994 for a better-preserved copy of the film in an uncut state. Eight years later, in Pittsburgh, Buckley found the negatives of Wake in Fright in a shipping container labelled "For Destruction". He rescued the material, which formed the basis for the film's painstaking 2009 restoration. Evidently a 35mm print in excellent condition had also survived in the collection of the Library of Congress, which screened it in the library's Mary Pickford Theater in 2008, although its reported running time of only 96 minutes suggests this was an edited version.

Wake in Fright was released on DVD and Blu-ray formats by Madman Entertainment on 4 November 2009, based on a digital restoration completed earlier that year. This restoration was shown to the general public for the first time at the Sydney Film Festival in June 2009, and in re-release has been called "a classic Australian film which has achieved cult status".

Umbrella Entertainment has since acquired the global distribution rights to the film. Umbrella announced on 17 May 2024 that they have produced a completely new restoration of the film, supervised by Mark Hartley, based on a fresh 4K re-scan from the original camera negative.
