= Wake in Fright (novel) =

1961 novel by Kenneth Cook

- Cover of the 1961 first edition
- Author: Kenneth Cook
- Cover artist: John Larkin (first edition)
- Language: English
- Genre: Psychological thriller
- Publisher: Michael Joseph, London
- Publication date: 1961
- Publication place: Australia
- Media type: Print
- Pages: 191 pp
- ISBN: 0207140138

Wake in Fright (1961) is the debut novel by Australian author Kenneth Cook.

== Plot summary ==
John Grant is a young, bonded schoolteacher who has been assigned to work a gruelling two-year post as the schoolmaster of Tiboonda, an isolated, three-building township in the outback of western New South Wales. Upon finishing school in time for the six-week Christmas holiday season, Grant catches a train to the mining town of Bundanyabba – known by the locals as "The Yabba" – to await a flight home to Sydney, where he hopes to spend his vacation swimming at the nearby beach. While passing time in a pub, Grant encounters the local policeman, Jock Crawford, with whom he drinks several glasses of beer and visits the local two-up school to get dinner. Deciding to try his luck at the game, Grant makes two hundred pounds in a winning streak, but in a bid to win enough money to pay off his bond and impress Robyn – a wealthy and attractive woman he briefly encountered in Sydney – he loses all but two shillings of his cash in two rounds, leaving him without means of buying a plane ticket.

The next morning, Grant visits another pub, where he is befriended by mining director Tim Hynes, who invites him to have dinner with his wife and their adult daughter, Janette, and drink with two of his colleagues, boxers-turned-miners Dick and Joe. During the night, Janette attempts to seduce the virgin Grant, who drunkenly vomits during the encounter. He awakens the following afternoon in the ramshackle cabin of "Doc" Tydon, a vagrant medical practitioner, war veteran and associate of the Hynes. Grant quickly takes a disliking to Doc when he expounds upon his open relationship with Janette. They are joined by Dick and Joe in a violent, drunken kangaroo hunt that rages into the night. Upon awakening the next morning, Grant faintly recalls being involved in a homosexual encounter initiated by Doc.

Taking the rifle gifted to him by Dick and Joe and leaving Doc's cabin, he is encountered by Crawford in the street, who returns his belongings that were left behind during his rendezvous with the Hynes. Resolving to hitchhike to Sydney, Grant buys some provisions and begins walking eastward through the desert, and is eventually driven to the town of Yelonda. At a truck depot near a hotel, he notices a truck bearing the word "Sydney". Interpreting this as the driver's destination, he successfully convinces the driver to give him a lift; although he offers his rifle and ammunition as payment, the driver allows him to keep the former. After a shorter-than-expected drive through the night, Grant realises that they have returned to The Yabba; the "Sydney" markings simply referred to where the driver had come from, not his destination.

Realising that he has no further means of leaving The Yabba and that his own actions – beginning with his initial encounter with Crawford – have led to his continued suffering and demise, Grant descends into a stupor of self-loathing and collapses in a nearby park, where he discovers that he has one remaining bullet for his rifle. After considering his options, he shoots himself in the head, the impact of which scars but fails to kill him. Grant spends the remainder of his holiday recovering in hospital, where he signs a statement from Crawford explaining that his suicide attempt was an accident, and briefly encounters Janette working as a nurse. After receiving a twenty pound loan from an almoner to pay for his hospital fee and promising to himself to "never get drunk again... except in good company", he returns to Tiboonda to begin the new school year. As he prepares to greet Charlie, the local hotelier and publican, Grant thinks to himself:

I can see quite clearly the ingenuity whereby a man may be made mean or great by exactly the same circumstances. I can see quite clearly that even if he chooses meanness the things he brings about can even then be wielded into a pattern of sanity for him to take advantage of if he wishes. [...] What I can't altogether see is why I should be permitted to be alive, and to know these things... But I feel that I will probably find out sometime.

== See also ==
- 1961 in Australian literature

== Notes ==
The novel takes its title from an old curse: "May you dream of the Devil and wake in fright."

The novel was re-issued by Text Publishing as a part of their Text Classics series in 2012. It contained an introduction by Peter Temple.

Warm Vellum bookshop listed the novel as having one of the best opening lines in literature. That line reads: "He sat at his desk, wearily watching the children file out of the room, reflecting that, this term at least, it was reasonable to assume that none of the girls was pregnant."

== Critical reception ==
In his introduction to the 2012 Text Publishing edition, Peter Temple said: "Wake in Fright is a young writer's work: romantic, at times naive. It also suffers from some uncertainty of character and there are problems of balance. These are flaws, but they are outmuscled by the writer's strengths. Cook can make us feel the heat, see the endless horizon, hear the sad singing on a little train as it traverses the monotonous plain... And Cook has range too. He captures the icy, flooding charm of a first beer on a heat-struck day. He knows what it feels like to catch luck's eye and hold the gaze across a smoky room, to feel the irrational deservedness of it, to hear fortune singing sweet in the veins. And he knows dark things—the frightening chasm that opens when certainty disappears, the savagery in the human heart. Wake in Fright has the power to disturb, a rare thing in any novel."

== Adaptation ==
The novel was adapted for the screen in 1971. The film was directed by Ted Kotcheff, from a script by Evan Jones, and featured Gary Bond, Donald Pleasence and Chips Rafferty in the lead roles.

The novel was also adapted for a two-part miniseries in 2017.
