= Marny Kennedy =

Australian actress

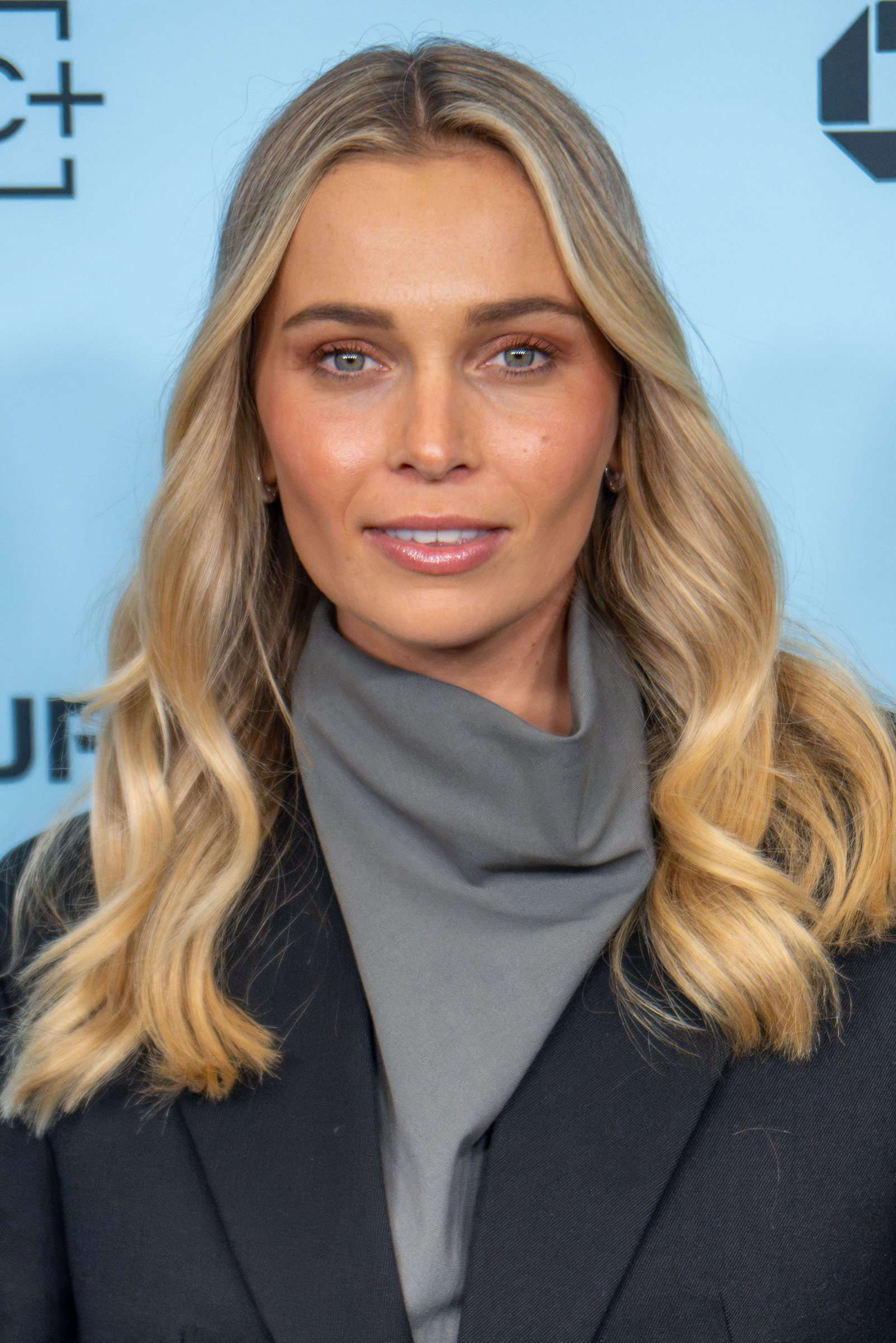
- Marny Kennedy at the 2025 Sundance Film Festival promoting Last Days
- Born: Marny Elizabeth Isabella Kennedy; 21 January 1994 (age 32); Melbourne, Victoria, Australia
- Occupations: Actress; singer; model
- Years active: 2001-present
- Known for: Mortified; The Saddle Club; A gURLs wURLd; Conspiracy 365; Warnie
- Spouse: Rulla Kelly-Mansell (m. 2024)
- Children: 1

Marny Elizabeth Isabella Kennedy (born January 21, 1994 in Melbourne, Victoria, Australia) is an Australian actress, singer and model best known for her roles as Taylor Fry in the television series Mortified (receiving the 2006 Australian Film Institute's Young Actor Award in the process), Veronica di Angelo in The Saddle Club, Ally Henson in A gURLs wURLd, Winter Frey in the TV adaptation of Conspiracy 365, Lucy Baldwin in Janet King, Amber Wells in Bite Club, Senior Constable Melanie Jassic in Underbelly Files: Chopper, Taylah Bullock in Wentworth, Young Noelene Hoges in Hoges: The Paul Hogan Story, Martina Budd in Between Two Worlds and Rachel Young in Home and Away, among others. In 2009, shortly after The Saddle Club ended, Marny made her film debut in Ink as May. In 2011, shortly after A gURLs wURLd ended, Marny appeared in Golden Girl as Cilla, a teenage girl whose life is drastically changed after becoming scarred by a fire. In 2022, Marny was announced for the role of Simone Callaghan in two episodes of the controversial miniseries Warnie. The decision to produce the miniseries about cricketer Shane Warne after his March 2022 death was criticized by both Shane's ex-wife, Simone Callahan (the character Marny portrayed in the miniseries) and daughter, Brooke, who described it as "unkind" and "mean-spirited" and "beyond disrespectful," respectively. Unfortunately, Brooke and Simone weren't the only ones to criticize the miniseries, as the trailer itself attracted negative commentary on social media when it was first shown on May 31, 2023, with critics arguing that the series placed too much emphasis on the more sensational aspects of Warne's life. In 2025, Marny played her most recent film role, that of Melanie in Last Days.

== Filmography ==
Films
Year	Title	Role	Notes
2009	Ink	Young May	Short film
2011	Golden Girl	Cilla	Short film
2020	Bossy	Lucy	Short film
2025	Last Days	Melanie	

=== TV ===
TV shows and appearances
Year	Title	Role	Notes
2006-2007	Mortified	Taylor Fry	Lead role
2008-2009	The Saddle Club	Veronica di Angelo	Main role
2009	Rush	Amanda Moss	"2.21" (Season 2, Episode 21)
2010-2011	a gURLs wURLd	Ally Henson	Main role
2012	Conspiracy 365	Winter Frey	Main role
2016	Comedy Showroom	Sales Assistant	"The Future is Expensive" (Season 1, Episode 4)
2017	Hoges: The Paul Hogan Story	Young Noelene Hoges	"1.1" (Season 1, Episode 1)
2017	Janet King	Lucy Baldwin	Recurring role
2017	Top of the Lake	German Girl	"The Loved One" (Season 2, Episode 2)
2018	Wanted	Elsa	"Drive" (Season 3, Episode 2) (miniseries)
2018	Bite Club	Amber Wells	Main role
2018	Underbelly Files: Chopper	Senior Constable Melanie Jassic	"1.1" (Season 1, Episode 1)
2018	Wentworth	Taylah Bullock	3 episodes
2020	Between Two Worlds	Martina Budd	Main role
2021	Home and Away	Rachel Young	Recurring role
2023	Warnie	Simone Callahan	2 episodes (miniseries)

== Discography ==
=== Soundtrack albums ===
List of albums
Title	Album details
a gURLs wURLd	Released: 15 March 2010; Format: CD, digital download; Label: Endemol

=== Other appearances ===
Title	Year	Album
"Together We Can Win" featuring Aisha Dee	2009	The Saddle Club Best Friends; Grand Galop – Meilleures Amies
"It's My Life"	2009	The Saddle Club Best Friends; Grand Galop – Meilleures Amies
"A Question of Style" featuring Aisha Dee	2009	"The Saddle Club - Pedigree" (Season 3 episode only)
