= Kenneth Cook =

Australian film director

- Born: Kenneth Bernard Cook; 5 May 1929; Lakemba, New South Wales, Australia
- Died: 18 April 1987 (aged 57); Narromine, New South Wales, Australia
- Occupations: Filmmaker, journalist, novelist
- Known for: Wake in Fright; Eliza Fraser

Kenneth Bernard Cook (5 May 1929 – 18 April 1987) was an Australian journalist, television documentary maker, and novelist best known for his work Wake in Fright, which is still in print five decades after its first publication, and the humorous Killer Koala trilogy.

== Career ==
Born in the Sydney suburb of Lakemba, Cook attended Fort Street High School. After leaving school he worked around Australia in a variety of jobs including laboratory technician, journalist and television documentary-maker, and boatshed operator.

In 1966, with businessman Gordon Barton, Cook founded a new political party, the Liberal Reform Group. Cook was vehemently opposed to the Vietnam War, and stood (unsuccessfully) as an LRG candidate for the seat of Parramatta in the 1966 Australian federal election.

A keen amateur lepidopterist, Cook established the first butterfly farm in Australia on the banks of Sydney's Hawkesbury River in the 1970s.

Several of Cook's novels were adapted for the screen. Wake in Fright was filmed in 1971 by Ted Kotcheff, starring Donald Pleasence and Gary Bond (released under the title Outback in Europe and the US). Stockade was filmed by Ross McGregor and Hans Pomeranz, also in 1971. In 1976 The Bushranger was made into a telemovie, starring Leonard Teale, John Hamblin and Kate Fitzpatrick.

Cook also wrote one episode of the Australian TV children's adventure series The Rovers (1970).

In 2007 Cook's novel The Man Underground was adapted as a radio drama by ABC Radio National.

A 72-minute audio interview with Cook by Hazel de Berg was recorded in 1972, in which he discusses his family, his work for the ABC, the background to Wake in Fright, his ventures into film production and his novels. The interview is preserved in the collection of the National Library of Australia.

He also wrote novels under the pseudonyms Alan Hale and John Duffy. Cook's literary estate is managed by Curtis Brown Australia.

== Personal life ==
Cook was married to Patricia Hickie, with whom he had four children, Megan (an accomplished journalistic-style writer in her own right, as Megan Gressor), Kerry, Paul and Anthony. He and Patricia were subsequently divorced. Cook died of a heart attack in 1987, aged 57, while on a camping trip with his second wife, Jacqueline Kent. Patricia Cook died suddenly in 2006; daughter Megan Gressor died unexpectedly from post-operative complications in 2007, aged 52; his youngest son Anthony, a prominent lawyer who was well known for his work with Indigenous Australians, killed himself in April 2009.

== Bibliography ==
=== Novels ===
- Wake in Fright (1961)
- Chain of Darkness (1962)
- Vantage to the Gale (1963) as by "Alan Hale"
- Wanted Dead (1963) as by "Alan Hale" – filmed as The Bushranger (1976)
- The Take (1963) as by "John Duffy"
- Stormalong (1963)
- Tuna (1967)
- The Wine of God's Anger (1968)
- Piper in the Market-place (1971)
- Bloodhouse (1974)
- Eliza Fraser (1976)
- The Man Underground (1977)
- Play Little Victims (1978)
- Pig (1980)
- The Film-Makers (1983)
- The Judas Fish (1983)
- Fear is the Rider (2016)

=== Short story collections ===
- The Killer Koala (1986)
- Wombat Revenge (1987)
- Frill-Necked Frenzy (1987)

=== Non-fiction ===
- Blood Red Roses (1963) travel

=== TV play ===
- I'm Damned If I Know (1972)
