= List of Australian films of 1972 =

== 1972 ==
Title	Director	Cast	Genre	Notes
The Adventures of Barry McKenzie	Bruce Beresford	Barry Crocker, Barry Humphries, Spike Milligan, Peter Cook	Comedy	IMDb
Caravan Holiday		Johnny Young and Young Talent Team, Johnny Farnham, Buster Fiddess	Feature Short Film	IMDb
A City's Child	Brian Kavanagh	Monica Maughan, Sean Scully, Moira Carleton, Vivean Gray, Marguerite Lofthouse, Roger Scales, Donna Drake	Drama / Romance Feature film	IMDb
Crisis	Bill Hughes	Queenie Ashton, Deryck Barnes, Neva Carr-Glynn, Diane Craig, Larry Crane, Sandy Harbutt, Brendon Lunney, Gerard Maguire, Helen Morse	Drama / Thriller TV film / TV Pilot	
Flashpoint				IMDb
Gentle Strangers				IMDb
The Lady and the Law	Ron Way	Jill Forster, Anne Haddy, Brian James, Nigel Lovell, Max Meldrum, Judy Morris, Peter Reynolds, Peter Sumner, John Winston	TV pilot	
Lalai Dreamtime				IMDb
Marco Polo Junior Versus the Red Dragon	Eric Porter	Bobby Rydell, Arnold Stang	Animation	IMDb
Morning of the Earth	Albert Falzon		Feature film	
Night of Fear	Terry Bourke	Norman Yemm, Carla Hoogeveen, Briony Behets, Mike Dorsey	Horror / Thriller Feature Short film	IMDb
The Office Picnic	Tom Cowan	John Wood, Kate Fitzpatrick, Philip Deamer, Ben Gabriel, Max Cullen, Patricia Kennedy, Gayte Steele, Byron Kennedy	Comedy Feature film	IMDb, Entered into the 8th Moscow International Film Festival
Private Collection	Keith Salvat	Peter Reynolds, Pamela Stephenson, Grahame Bond, Noel Ferrier, John Paramor, Les Foxcroft, Brian Blain	Comedy Feature film	
Shirley Thompson vs. the Aliens	Jim Sharman	Jane Harders, June Collis, John Ivkovitch, Helmut Bakaitis, Tim Elliot, John Llewellyn, Kate Fitzpatrick, Marion Johns, Candy Raymond, Ron Haddrick	Comedy / Sci-Fi Feature film	IMDb
Sunstruck	James Gilbert	Harry Secombe, Maggie Fitzgibbon, John Meillon, Dawn Lake, Bobby Limb, Peter Whittle, Norman Erskine, Derek Nimmo, Stuart Wagstaff	Comedy Feature film	
The Runner		Delvene Delaney	Short film	IMDb

== See also ==
- 1972 in Australia
