= David Johnstone =

Australian LGBTQ activist (1938 – 2017)

David Johnstone (1938 – 2017) was an LGBTQ activist and pioneer of a gay intentional-community, named Mandala, in the Northern Rivers region of New South Wales, Australia.

Earlier in his career he was also a performer in the Sydney based band The Steeds and later worked for record companies and in production for numerous Australian daytime television shows.

== Early life and career ==
Johnstone was born in Moree until, when he was 18 months old, he and his family moved to Ramsgate in Sydney. In 1950 he enrolled at Sydney Boys High School and, in an oral history interview, he recalls being unmercifully bullied there.

It was an early ambition of Johnstone's to become a dancer on Broadway and, after finishing school, he joined a band The Steeds in which he performed as the leader and rhythm guitarist under the name David Stone. They performed at various venues around Sydney including numerous Police Boys Clubs and later the Trocadero and the Phyllis Bate's Ballroom. They also completed three major tours on the Australian east coast and, on one of these, performed 32 shows in 28 days.

By the early 1960s the band was winding up and Johnstone began working for record companies and managing other bands. During this period, around 1961 or 1962, he also suffered from mental health issues and spent a period of time at Broughton Hall, an in-patient mental health facility. There he was told not to reveal that he was gay in group therapy due to the risk that it would be used against him and because homosexuality was then illegal in New South Wales.

Later in the 1960s Johnstone began working in daytime television, through NLT Productions, and this included working on Woobinda (Animal Doctor), where he started in the role of assistant to the producer and later, on the show The Rovers, was first assistant director. Johnstone finished with NTL in the late 1960s and began working for Crawford Productions but was losing his interest in the work and was in the process of re-evaluating his life choices. This was, in part, due to his decision to start smoking cannabis and using other substances.

== Establishment of Mandala ==
Johnstone also became involved in the hippie subculture and the 'Down to Earth' movement and, as a part of this, he began looking for land on which to live and write. He first looked at land in New Zealand and Western Australia but, after dismissing them, he began looking in the Northern Rivers as it was becoming a centre for people seeking alternative lifestyles. He first looked at Nimbin, through his attendance at the Aquarius Festival, but found that it wasn't for him but soon found something suitable nearby in Uki.

In late 1973, Johnstone established an intentional community, also known as a commune, called Mandala which was 6 kilometres (3.7 mi) from the village of Uki and it was designed to be a harmonious place for gay men, and their friends, to live with a focus on those that needed emotional, spiritual and physical healing. It also had the additional goals of being vegetarian and ecologically sound. Johnstone called it:

[The] "first piece of rural land owned and run by homosexuals for the benefit of our community”

— David Johnstone

In an oral history interview he recalled initially being treated with a high level of suspicion and that local residents of Uki, and the nearby Murwillumbah, believed that he, and his group, represented a real threat and he faced many accusations. Additionally he recalled feeling like "David, the first gay in the village, the only gay in the village".

The first major building on the commune was a tiny house created by converting a banana shed which was soon followed by a roundhouse. By 1974 there were regular groups of people living there, often up to 20 men, women and children, although sometimes only Johnstone remained.

In the 1980s Mandala became a charitable trust, which was advertised in the Australian gay press, and this led to the creation of Friends of Mandala groups in both Sydney and Melbourne and it encouraged 'capital city folk' to visit the 'gay alternative'. During this period Johnstone also began hosting regular gatherings each year with one of the most significant being his 1982 Easter Country Gathering which was associated with the Radical Faeries. Events held were generally aimed at gay men, however, in 1983 a Caring & Sharing Retreat for Wimmin & Lesbians was held in January.

While living at Mandala Johnstone was also involved in the wider Uki community and led the Uki Kulture Klub in which he produced and directed numerous musicals and plays including; The Uki Follies of 1915 and Uki Space Follies, inspired by the Ziegfeld Follies, as well as Genghis Khan, The Women and Too Smart for Sydney. These were performed by local amateurs at local halls and community event spaces throughout the region. In these productions he helped to bridge the divide between the local hippie community and the pioneering dairy and timber farmers.

Johnstone primarily stopped Mandala in 1992 and sold the property in 2000 and relocated to Murwillumbah where he started constructing 'The Greenhouse', a sustainable home project.

== Later life and death ==
In 2014, following a cancer diagnosis, Johnstone retired to Cambodia where he was actively involved in supporting land mine victims, people with disabilities and local education. He died in Siem Reap in 2017.

== Papers ==
Johnstone's papers and photographs, as well as an oral history recorded with him, are held at the Australian Queer Archives.

In 2020 Johnstone, and images taken by him, were featured in Small Town Queer a digital exhibition by the Tweed Regional Museum.
