= Buster Fiddess =

Australian comedian (c. 1914–1972)

- Fiddess with his singing dog, Jake, 1948.
- Born: Leslie Anderson; 1913 or 1914; Australia
- Died: 14 January 1972 (age 58 or 59); Collaroy, New South Wales, Australia
- Other names: Buster Fiddes, Buster Fiddis
- Occupations: Vaudevillian, comedian, actor, acrobat
- Years active: 1936–1972
- Known for: The Bobby Limb Show
- Spouse: Iris Cattach (m. 1939)

Buster Fiddess (born Leslie Anderson c. 1914 – 14 January 1972) was an Australian comedian, best known for his work in vaudeville (1936–1958) and television variety shows (1957–1972). He was described as a "rubber-faced" actor, who "wore tails and walked like a mechanically wound-up man, with a straight back and straight, long, fair hair". He won the Best Comedian category at the Logie Awards of 1961 for the The Bobby Limb Show (alongside its host, Bobby Limb).

== Biography ==
Buster Fiddess was born as Leslie Anderson, in 1913 or 1914. He started his entertainment career in a circus. By March 1936 he was performing in a duo, the "Fiddes Brothers", which were an eccentric dancing and tumbling act in Mildura's Green Mill dance hall and then at vaudeville shows in Brisbane in July and August. In October of that year, Joshua Fiddes (aged 25) and Buster Leslie Fiddes (22), were working in Sydney at the notorious dance-cabaret Graham's Club ("a law unto itself") in Hunter Street. They were each fined £A50 for serving alcohol in an unlicensed premises. They continued as "Fiddes Brothers, acrobats and eccentric dancers from America", (Note: A similar assertion was made in newspaper adverts or articles of the time, but may have been an attempt to improve their public profile.) and were engaged on the Tivoli circuit during 1936–37 and at Sydney Trocadero in July 1937, and then other shows in rural New South Wales.

By December 1937 Buster Fiddes was working solo and advertised himself as "Australia's youngest and funniest comedian". From April to July 1938 he performed for George Sorlie's shows in Bathurst, Orange and Narromine in New South Wales and Mackay and Cairns, in Queensland. He worked as a vocalist and comedian with Billy Heaton's troupe, which toured Western Australia from July to August 1939, supported by his straight man, John Carfax. (Note: The real name of John Carfax was Hal Andrews, under which name he performed with comedians Will and Dora Gilbert 1928–29.) Fiddes and Carfax were heard on Perth's radio station 6PR in July, when they provided vocal duets at Piccadilly Theatre for a S.T.C. programme, which was broadcast. The Mullewa Mail's reporter noticed, "The company was headed by [Fiddes], a young Australian comedian, who definitely has a future on the stage. His delivery and style are refreshingly novel and he shows twists of originality which should take him a long way."

Fiddes married Iris Cattach of Perth in December 1939 in a "village smithy" wedding held in a public park, Campsie, New South Wales. Cattach had been the ballet mistress with Billy Heaton's troupe earlier in that year. Fiddes performed with his wife (under her maiden name) on the Tivoli Circuit, mostly in Melbourne, from 1941 to 1945. Fiddes was associated with fellow Tivoli comedian, George Wallace. From March to April 1945 the married couple both worked with Wallace in United Nations at Cremorne Theatre, Brisbane. Fiddes was bashed and his face cut in November 1945 in Sydney, by three would-be thieves – he was treated in hospital. The assailants were frightened off by Fiddes's dog, Jake. Fiddes had found Jake in a Victorian country town in mid-1945 and subsequently trained him as a singing dog (see photo, above).

Fiddes concluded a season of nation-wide radio programmes in early 1948, before joining Will Mahoney's Yankee Pankee at Cremorne Theatre in May 1948 alongside "Mentalist Piddington", who used thought transference to read people's minds. In Mahoney's next revue, Pleasure Bound at the Cremorne in July–August, Fiddes created "Kiddington", a satirical mind reading act. He was partnered by Joan Wilson for an adagio dance and a skit of "Romeo and Juliet" in December at Jubilee Theatre, Toowong. He was known from circus and "over the air" (radio). The comedian relocated to London in 1953 and, for at least two years, he worked in Europe and the Middle East. In June 1957 he performed Calypso Capers at the Tivoli, Sydney. According to Frank van Straten Fiddess was a "circuit favourite in revue and pantomime for twenty-two years" up to May 1958. Jonathan Bollen observed, "[he] was a successful pantomime dame in that longstanding tradition of cross-dressed comedy which maintained its popularity as holiday entertainment for children."

Australia's regular television broadcasting began in 1956 and its first anniversary, in September 1957, was celebrated on TCN-9 with a "lavish production" starring Fiddess, Bobby Limb and Johnny O'Connor as well as "the entire cast of the then current Tivoli show". Fiddess became a regular on The Bobby Limb Show from 1959 to 1961. The comedian portrayed "female roles in theatrical spoofs such as Miss Anna from The King and I and Maid Marion in The Adventures of Rob’em Good [... and] an ageing Aunt Gladys in domestic sketches". At the Logie Awards of 1961 he shared the Best Comedian award win with Limb, while The Bobby Limb Show won New South Wales' Most Popular Program. Fiddess also appeared in other TV variety programs, Bandwagon (1959–1960), In Melbourne Tonight, The Mobil Limb Show (1961–1964) and Here's Dawn (1964–1965). Later he undertook non-comedic, cameo roles on various TV drama series, Homicide, Matlock Police (both 1971), Spyforce and Boney (both 1972). Fiddess portrayed Charlie Jones in the thriller feature film, Wake in Fright (or Outback, 1971) and Mr Crawley in children's television short film, Caravan Holiday (1972). He undertook the role of Ted in the pilot episode of TV series, Snake Gully with Dad and Dave (1972).

Fiddess had performed for allied troops in October 1970, South Vietnam during the Vietnam War:

Veteran comedian Buster Fiddess was a big hit with a large group of troops when he performed at the 1st Australian Task Force Base (1ATF), at Nui Dat. He was a member of the Sydney Concert Party which toured Australian, and some American bases in the war zone this month. The concert party also included three female vocalists, Helen Noonan, Sylvia Raye and Mary-Jane Boyde and fourteen members of the Sydney ABC Show Band, with compère, Gordon Boyd.

Buster Fiddess died suddenly on 14 January 1972 at his home in Collaroy, New South Wales. He had portrayed the second ugly sister in a Cinderella pantomime at Rockdale Town Hall earlier that day. He was survived by his wife and five children. On 6 February 1972, a benefit concert to assist his family was held at the State Theatre, Sydney. Stars taking part were Boyd, Limb, Tony Barber, Johnny Farnham, Maggie Fitzgibbon, Col Joye, Kamahl, Graham Kennedy, Dawn Lake, Johnny Lockwood, Little Pattie and Stuart Wagstaff. A posthumous TV appearance in Carry On Spike in Australia was broadcast on Channel 9 on 20 March 1972. It was compèred by John Laws and starred Spike Milligan, supported by Ruth Cracknell and John Meillon. Fiddess's role of Ted in Snake Gully with Dad and Dave was taken over by Noel Ferrier.

Australian actor and writer Cul Cullen in November 1980 criticised television comedy shows, The Mavis Bramston Show and Kingswood Country and the character Norman Gunston as being unfunny, while opining "the ingredient most obviously missing from local comedy is good nature." Cullen contrasted those comedians with Fiddess and Wallace, who provided "Australian comedy that was actually funny [... from] great natural comics, sadly no longer with us." In 1984 television critic Phillip Adams reflected on the lack of comedic development in Australian TV humour after the mid-1960s and cited Fiddess and Wallace as innovative examples of that era. Fellow Tivoli performer Val Jellay recalled in 1994 that Fiddess's "comedy combined travesty, disruption and visual gags".
