= Penicillium tealii =

Scientific classification
- Domain: Eukaryota
- Kingdom: Fungi
- Division: Ascomycota
- Class: Eurotiomycetes
- Order: Eurotiales
- Family: Aspergillaceae
- Genus: Penicillium
- Species: P. tealii

Binomial name
- Penicillium tealii Y.P.Tan, Bishop-Hurley, Marney & R.G.Shivas (2022)

Species of fungus

Penicillium tealii is a species of fungus in the genus Penicillium. It was discovered at Rowlands Creek near Uki in far northeastern New South Wales in April 2021 on the body of a dead spider. Citizen scientist Donovan Teal accidentally discovered the fungus while collecting samples of insect-eating fungi and it was subsequently named after him.

== See also ==
- List of Penicillium species
