= Anthony Buckley =

Australian film editor and producer

Anthony Buckley AO
- Born: 27 July 1937 (age 88)
- Occupations: Film producer, editor
- Years active: 1958–2019

Anthony Buckley AO (born 27 July 1937) is an Australian film producer and editor.

== Career ==
On leaving school, Buckley went to work for Cinesound Productions as a projectionist and assistant editor. He worked in Canada and Britain before returning to Australia in 1965. He went to work at Ajax Films and moved into producing.

He edited Michael Powell's Age of Consent. He had the film rights to the stage play The One Day of the Year and almost made a film with Louis F. Edelman, who made Adam's Woman with Buckley, but withdrew the project when Edelman wanted to cast American actors.

In 1974 he produced the train film A Steam Train Passes. 24 years later he produced another two train films, Savannahlander and Gulflander. He produced the mini-series The Harp in the South and its sequel Poor Man's Orange.

== Honours and awards ==
- Member of the Order of Australia, for service to the media, 1977
- Raymond Longford Award Lifetime Achievement Award, 2000
- Ken G. Hall Award, 2000
- Officer of the Order of Australia, for "distinguished service to the cinematic arts as a producer, director and editor, and to film preservation", 2025

== Partial filmography ==
=== As editor ===
- The Stowaway (1958) (assistant)
- Age of Consent (1969)
- Adam's Woman (1970)
- Wake in Fright (1971)
- Don Quixote (1973)

=== As producer ===
- Forgotten Cinema (1967) – documentary
- Snow, Sand and Savages
- Caddie (1976)
- A Steam Train Passes (1974)
- The Night the Prowler (1978)
- The Killing of Angel Street (1981)
- Bliss (1985)
- The Harp in the South (1986)
- Poor Man's Orange (1987)
- The Heroes (1989) – mini-series
- Roads Without Wheels. Man on the Rim: The Peopling of the Pacific. Landmark Media. 1989.
- More Winners – Mr Edmond (1990)
- Heroes II: The Return (1991) – mini-series
- Nazi Supergrass (1993)
- Bedevil (1993)
- The Celluloid Heroes (1995) - documentary series
- Yum Cha Cha (2001)
- Oyster Farmer (2004)
- Savannahlander (2008)
- Gulflander (2010)
- At the Coliseum Deluxe (2019)
