= Dawn Lake =

Australian TV comedian, singer, entertainer, and actor (1927–2006)

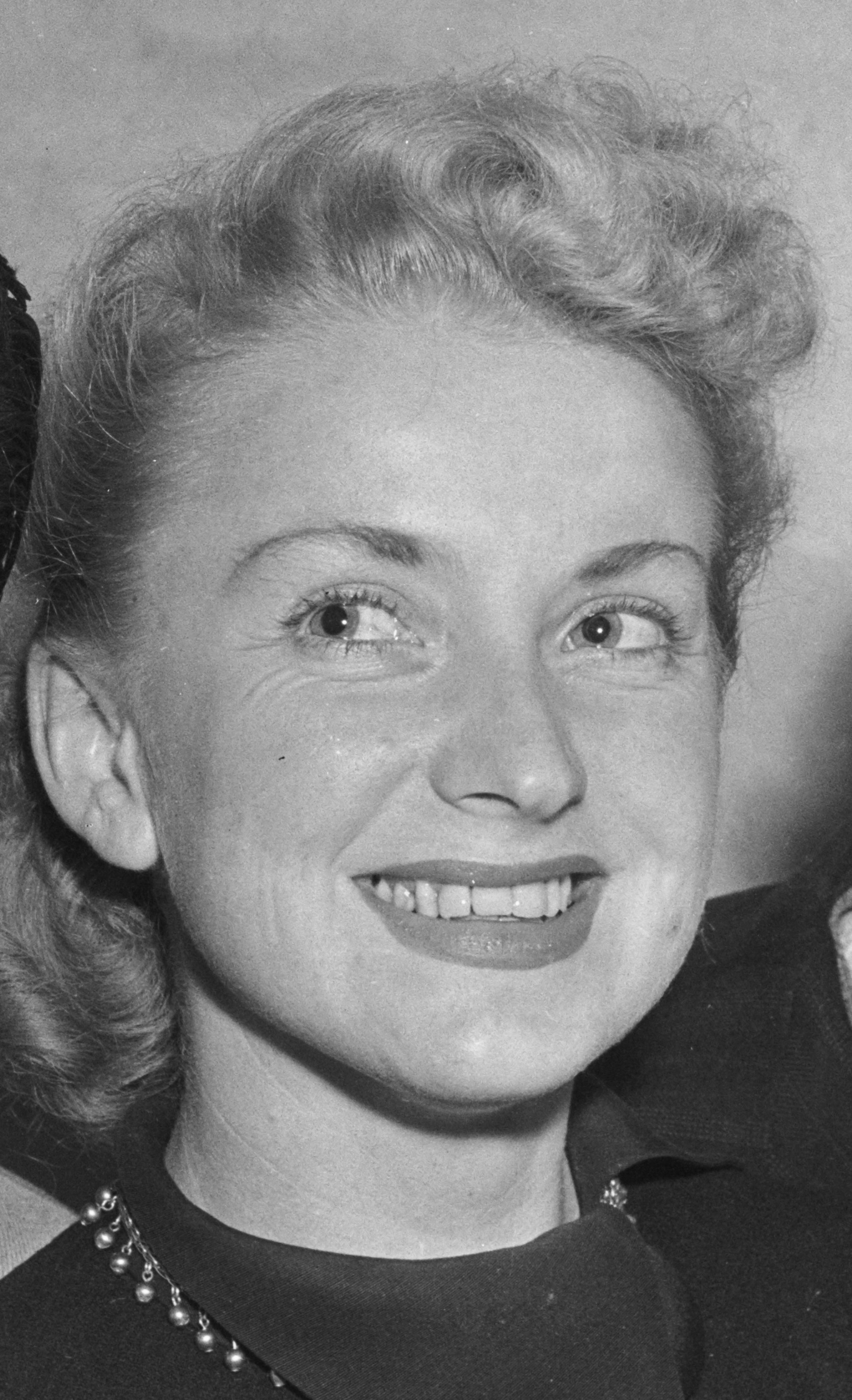
- Dawn Lake, Sydney,1952
- Born: Dawn Alice Lake; 20 January 1927; Balmain, New South Wales, Australia
- Died: 1 January 2006 (aged 78); Sydney, New South Wales, Australia
- Occupations: Actress; comedienne; singer
- Years active: 1948–1999
- Spouse: Bobby Limb

Dawn Alice Lake (20 January 1927 – 1 January 2006) was an Australian television comedian, singer, entertainer, and actor whose career spanned more than 50 years. She was particularly associated in show business with her husband Bobby Limb.

Entertainer Bert Newton described her as "our greatest comedienne – Australia's Lucille Ball".

== Early life ==
Dawn Alice Lake was born to a Balmain working-class family, the youngest of four children. She married entertainer Bobby Limb in 1953 and they had one daughter, Debbie, born in 1955.

She was married to Limb for 46 years, although the marriage had its ups and downs, including a separation for a year in 1973. She lost her brother, David, to suicide in 1965. Bobby Limb died in 1999, after which she withdrew from performing life.

== Career ==
She started her career as a singer in a local dance hall when she was 21, and soon after was contracted to Joe Taylor's Celebrity Club circuit. She met Bobby Limb at this time. After their marriage in 1953, they went to the UK where she had won a contract to sing with the BBC Show Band. Their careers went well in England over the next four years, with Lake appearing frequently as a guest on the Cyril Stapleton radio show, and with the couple appearing at the London Palladium and on the Moss Empire circuit. On their return to Australia in 1957 she appeared on the Tivoli circuit, and sang on 2UE and ABC radio stations, frequently with Bobby Limb's band.

While she came to prominence on radio programs compered by Jack Davey and comedian George Wallace, she found her greatest fame through her collaborations with Bobby Limb on the early Australian television programs The Mobil Limb Show produced by TCN9, Bobby Limb's Sound of Music, and, for two years in the mid-1960s, Here's Dawn. Limb's production company also created the situation comedy series The Private World of Miss Prim (1966) as a vehicle for Lake, but the series was short-lived. Lake was subsequently a regular for the 1967 season of the top-rated sketch comedy program The Mavis Bramston Show.

Through the 1970s she guest starred in Australian drama series such as Division 4 and Glenview High, and appeared as a panellist on Graham Kennedy's game show Blankety Blanks. She also made a few appearances in dramatic feature films of this period, with roles in Squeeze a Flower, Sunstruck, Alvin Purple, and the controversial Wake in Fright. She also returned to the stage at this time, appearing such shows as Some of My Best Friends Aren't, Just for Arthur, Move Over Mrs Markham and The Mating Season (opposite Sid James). In her later life she participated in a series of national concerts for seniors, organised by Limb.

Bobby Limb and Dawn Lake entertained Australian troops in Vietnam, and were active in the campaign to elect the Whitlam Labour government in 1972, including taking part in the campaign song, It's Time.

Her most enduring character was Ethel, who first appeared in the early 1960s in The Mobil Limb Show. "You tell 'em, luv!" was Ethel's catchcry, a line which was quickly adopted by Federal politicians during parliamentary Question Time.

== Filmography ==
=== Film ===
Year	Title	Role	Type
1970	Squeeze a Flower	Dawn Lambert	Feature film
1971	Wake in Fright	Joyce	Feature film
1972	Sunstruck	Sal Cassidy	Feature film

=== Television ===
Year	Title	Role	Type
1954	Show Case	Guest	TV series UK, 1 episode
1955	It's a Great Life	Guest	TV series UK, 1 episode
1956	The Private World of Miss Prim		TV pilot
1958	Bandwagon	Singer	TV special
1959–1961	The Bobby Limb Show	Guest	TV series
1961–1964	The Mobil-Limb Show	Guest	TV series
1963	The Dawn Lake Show	Guest	TV pilot
1963	The 4th Annual TV Week Logie Awards	Winner – 'Special Award for Comedy	TV special
1963–1968	Bobby Limb's Sound of Music	Regular guest	TV series
1964–1965	Here's Dawn	Various characters	TV series
1965	The 6th Annual TV Week Logie Awards	Winner – 'Best Female Personality'	TV special
1966	The Private World of Miss Prim	Miss Prim	TV series, 11 episodes
1967	The Mavis Bramston Show	Various characters	TV series
1969	The Rose and Crown	Regular role	TV series
1969	Riptide		TV series, 2 episodes
1969	The Rovers	Dawn Tobin / Mrs. Drury	TV series, 2 episodes
1970	Bobby Limb's Sounds of the 70's	Guest	TV series
1971	Dynasty	Colleen	TV series, 1 episode
1972	No No Nanette: Opening Night at Her Majesty's Theatre, Melbourne	Herself (with daughter Debbie)	TV special
1972	Division 4	Annie Morris	TV series, 1 episode
1972	Don't Mourn Buzzy: Buster Fiddess Memorial Concert	Herself	TV special
1972	Funny You Should Ask	Guest	TV series, episode 104
1972	ALP: It's Time Labor Campaign	Herself	Video
1972	Bobby Limb's Sound of Christmas	Guest (with Bobby Limb)	TV special
1973	The True Blue Show	Various characters	TV series, 1 episode
1974	Mac and Merle	Merle	TV pilot
1975	Celebrity Squares	Celebrity contestant	TV series, 2 episodes
1976	Alvin Purple	Mum	TV series, episode 3: "Like Father, Like Son"
1976	Showbiz: Bobby and Dawn	Guest (with Bobby Limb)	TV special
1977–1978	Graham Kennedy's Blankety Blanks	Regular Panelist	TV series
1977	Telethon '77	Guest (with Bobby Limb)	TV special
1978; 1979	The Mike Walsh Show	Guest (with Ron Frazer)	TV series, 1 episode
1978	Glenview High	Mrs. Marsh	TV series, 1 episode
1978	This Is Your Life	Special Guest	TV series, 1 episode: "Dawn Lake"
1979; 1980	The Mike Walsh Show	Guest (with Bobby Limb)	TV series, 1 episode
1979	Tickled Pink	Dot	TV series, 1 episode: "The Family Business"
1980	Celebrity Tattletales	Guest (with Bobby Limb)	TV series, 3 episodes
1980; 1984	The Mike Walsh Show	Guest (with (Bobby Limb)	TV series, 1 episode
1980	Telethon '80	Herself & Bobby Limb	TV Special
1981	Channel Nine Celebrates: 25 Years of Television	Guest	TV special
1981	Australian Theatre Festival: A Hard God	Aggie Cassidy	Teleplay
1984; 1985	The Mike Walsh Show	Guest (with Bobby Limb)	TV series, 1 episode
1984	The Tonight Show with Bert Newton	Guest (with Bobby Limb)	TV series, 1 episode
1985	The Mike Walsh Show	Guest (with Bobby Limb)	TV series, 1 episode
1986	21st Kids Birthday Channel Ten Telethon	Guest	TV special
1986	The Midday Show	Guest (with Bobby Limb)	TV series, 1 episode
1986	Seven Nightly News	Herself	TV series, 1 episode
1989	The Bert Newton Show	Guest (with Bobby Limb)	TV series, 1 episode
1990	The Private War of Lucinda Smith		TV miniseries, 2 episodes
1994	Gordon Chater: A Life	Guest	TV special
1999	The Bobby Limb Special	Guest	TV special

== Awards ==
Year	Association	Award	Result
1963	Logie Awards	Special Award for Comedy	Won
1965	Logie Awards	Best Female Personality	Won
