= Sunstruck =

- DVD cover
- Directed by: James Gilbert
- Written by: Stan Mars
- Produced by: James Grafton; Jack Neary
- Starring: Harry Secombe
- Cinematography: Brian West
- Edited by: Anthony Buckley; Barry Peters
- Music by: Peter Knight
- Production company: Immigrant Productions
- Distributed by: British Empire Films
- Release date: 18 November 1972
- Running time: 92 mins
- Countries: Australia; United Kingdom
- Language: English
- Budget: A$400,000

Sunstruck (also known as Education of Stanley Evans) is a 1972 British-Australian comedy film directed by James Gilbert and starring Harry Secombe, Maggie Fitzgibbon and John Meillon. It was written by Stan Mars.

== Plot ==
Stanley Evans, a Welsh schoolteacher, is very proud of the choir that he's formed with his pupils. But when the girl of his dreams — a new gym teacher — marries a fellow teacher, he decides to leave and migrate to Australia for a better life 'in the sun'.

From Sydney, he is assigned to a small school in the dead-end town of Kookaburra Springs, living in a small room over the local hotel run by Sal and Mick. All the kids live in farms throughout the district.

Homesick, and constantly playing recordings of his original school choir, he decides to form a choir of his new pupils, who haven't been taking him seriously and play pranks on him.

Mick secretly decides that the kids should enter a schools choir competition in Sydney, and when the application is accepted, Stan has only a few weeks left to train the group. They travel by bus to Sydney accompanied by Shirley, a feisty young lady who has taken a shine to Stan. But Shirley's brother doesn't want his sister involved with 'a fat little Welsh Pom', and makes clear his feelings to Stan before they leave.

The choir win a special commendation.

On his return, Stan marries Shirley.

== Cast ==
- Harry Secombe as Stanley Evans (final film role)
- Maggie Fitzgibbon as Shirley Marshall
- John Meillon as Mick Cassidy
- Peter Whittle as Pete Marshall
- Dennis Jordan as Steve Cassidy
- Dawn Lake as Sal Cassidy
- Bobby Limb as Bill
- Norm Erskine as Norm
- Jack Allen as Banjo
- Roger Cox as Ben
- Tommy Mack as Gunboat
- Derek Nimmo
- Stuart Wagstaff as announcer
- Benita Collings as Alice

== Production ==
The film was inspired by a poster used by the New South Wales government to attract teachers from Britain, where a teacher wearing swimmers and an academic board stands on Bondi Beach. It was designed as a vehicle for Harry Secombe and was shot near Parkes in New South Wales from January 1972. The budget mostly came from United States and British sources, with $100,000 from the Australian Film Development Corporation.

The pupils seen acting at choir practice in the early part of the film were from Afon Taf High School in Troedyrhiw. The choir recorded the entire choral soundtrack at the school and it was used in both the Welsh and Australian sequences. The beginning of the film used locations in two Welsh mining villages; Treharris and Trelewis near Merthyr Tydfil. The name of the school is Webster Street School, Treharris which has since been demolished for housing.

== Reception ==
The film did not perform particularly well commercially or critically.

Murray Noble wrote in The Monthly Film Bulletin: "A crude and sentimental comedy made mostly at the expense of the Australians who, besides speaking an impenetrable slang of their own, are stereotyped as brainless, soulless, cultureless and essentially humourless. Harry Secombe wallows in his contrasting Welshness, and the film is only partially redeemed by Maggie Fitzgibbon's convincing performance as his outback sweetheart, a lady who vents the hostility she feels towards her bossy brother Pete by alternately using him and his beer supplies as targets in her shooting practice."

In The Radio Times Guide to Films Dave Aldridge gave the film 1/5 stars, writing: "This star vehicle for singer and comedian Harry Secombe was made Down Under back in the days when the Welsh warbler used to summer there. Daft and dated, even at the time, the slight tale has Secombe playing a dimwit Welsh schoolteacher who emigrates to the Aussie outback. The simple-minded humour derives from his patent unsuitability for the new way of life. Thankfully, the sort of film they don't make any more."

Leslie Halliwell wrote "Simple minded, uninspired, predictable family comedy for star fans."
