= Clarrie Hall Dam =

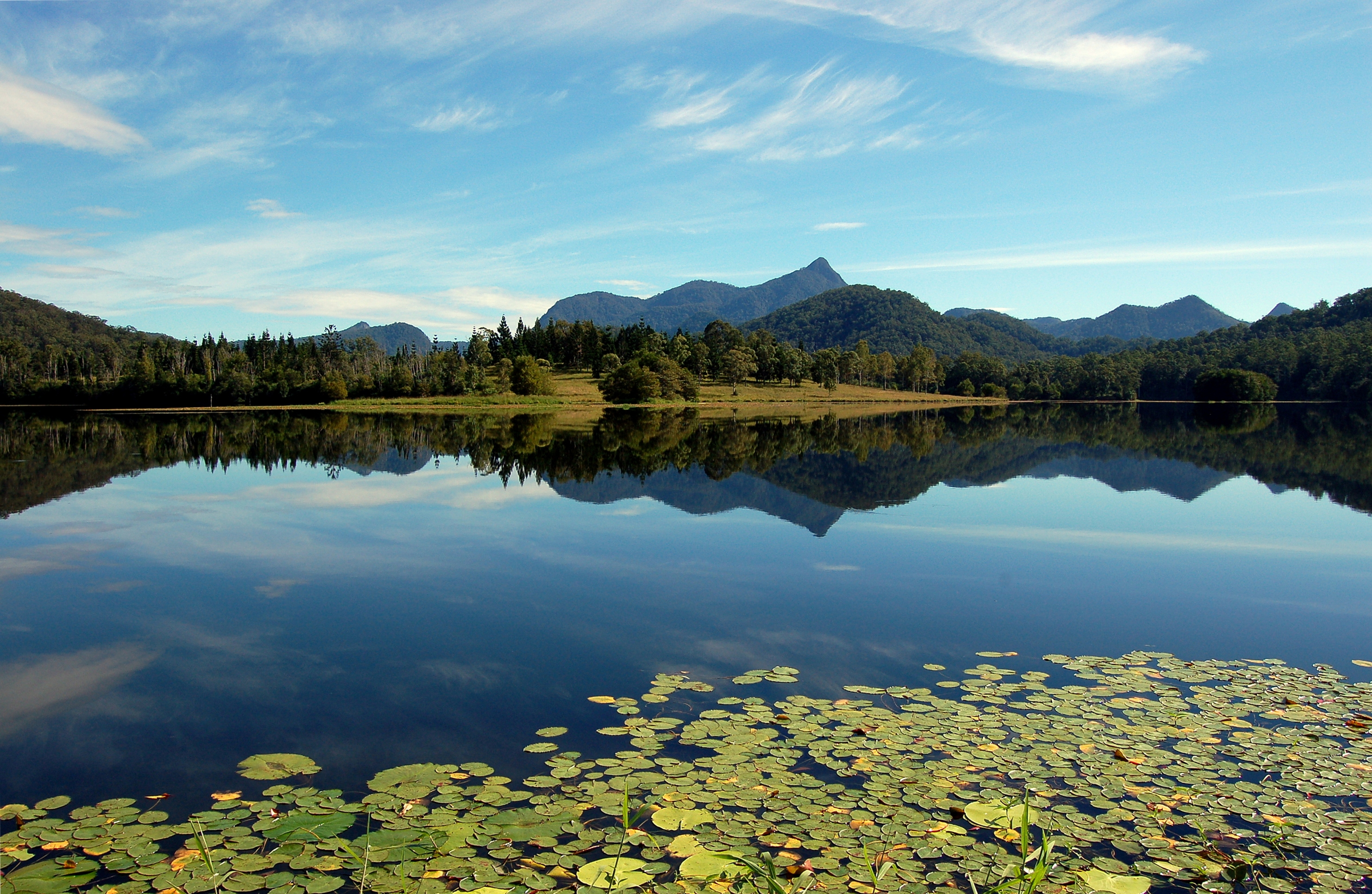
- Lake Clarrie Hall and Mount Warning

- Location of Clarrie Hall Dam in New South Wales
- Location: Northern Rivers, New South Wales, Australia
- Coordinates: 28°26′16″S 153°18′19″E
- Purpose: Water supply
- Status: Operational
- Construction began: 1979
- Opening date: 1983
- Construction cost: A$34 million
- Owner: Tweed Shire Council

Dam and spillways
- Type of dam: Rock-fill dam
- Impounds: Doon Doon Creek
- Height: 43 metres (141 ft)
- Length: 175 metres (574 ft)
- Elevation at crest: 61.5 metres (202 ft) AHD
- Width (crest): 6 metres (20 ft)
- Dam volume: 243 cubic metres (8,600 cu ft)
- Spillways: 1
- Spillway type: Ungated concrete chute
- Spillway capacity: 590 cubic metres per second (21,000 cu ft/s)

Reservoir
- Creates: Lake Clarrie Hall
- Total capacity: 16,000 megalitres (570×10^{6} cu ft)
- Active capacity: 15,000 megalitres (530×10^{6} cu ft)
- Inactive capacity: 10,000 megalitres (350×10^{6} cu ft)
- Catchment area: 60.2 square kilometres (23.2 sq mi)
- Surface area: 220 hectares (540 acres)
- Maximum water depth: 41 metres (135 ft)
- Website

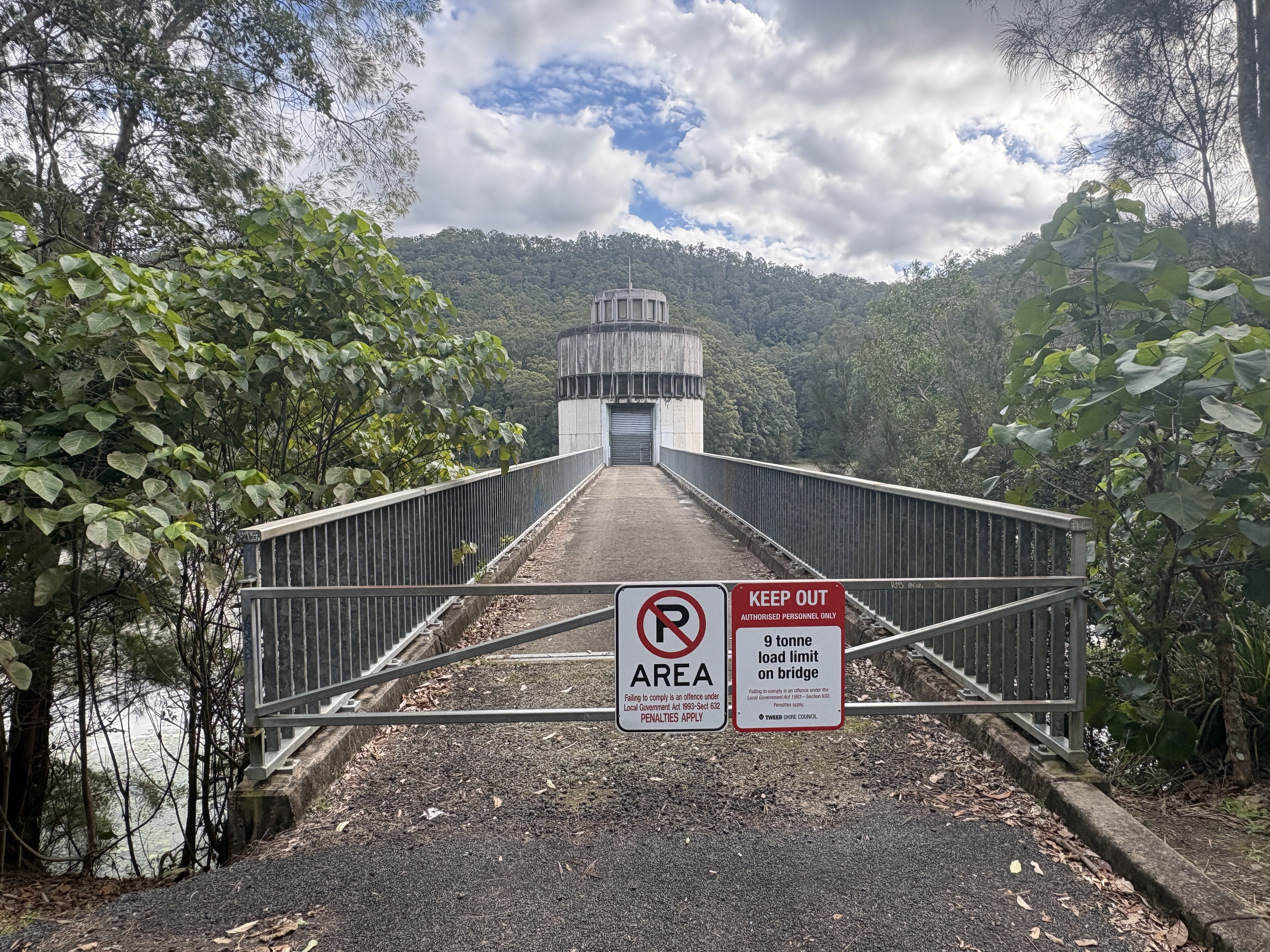
Clarrie Hall Dam, July 2026

Clarrie Hall Dam is a minor ungated concrete faced rockfill embankment dam with an uncontrolled concrete-lined chute spillway across the Doon Doon Creek, located upstream of the small town of Uki, in the Northern Rivers region of New South Wales, Australia. The main purpose of the dam is for water supply and it creates the artificial Lake Clarrie Hall.

== Origin of place name ==
The dam is named for Clarence Henry Hall (1906 - 1979), commonly known as Clarrie Hall, who was a councillor for Tweed Shire between 1953 until 1979. Hall was very involved in planning and preparation for the dam and, after his death, a unanimous vote was held to name it after him.

== Location and features ==
Clarrie Hall dam construction commenced in 1979 and it was opened in 1983 with the unique distinction of being full after heavy rainfall prior to the opening ceremony. It is a minor dam on the Doon Doon Creek, a tributary of the Tweed River, and is located approximately 15 kilometres (9.3 mi) south-west of Murwillumbah. The primary function of the dam is to provide storage of water for Tweed Shire's drinking water supply, by releasing water downstream into Doon Doon Creek when levels of freshwater in the Tweed River fall below 95%, which occurs mostly in winter and spring. Otherwise the natural flows of the Tweed River provide 80% of the water needs of the Shire.

The dam wall height is 43 metres (141 ft) and is 175 metres (574 ft) long. The maximum water depth is 41 metres (135 ft) and at 100% capacity the dam wall holds back 16,000 megalitres (570×10^{6} cu ft) of water at 61.5 metres (202 ft) AHD. The surface area of Lake Clarrie Hall is 220 hectares (540 acres) and the catchment area is 60.2 square kilometres (23.2 sq mi). The uncontrolled chute spillway is capable of discharging 590 cubic metres per second (21,000 cu ft/s). The estimated completion cost was A$34 million.

In April 2013, an upgrade of Clarrie Hall Dam commenced, and included widening the existing spillway crest to 35 metres (115 ft) and raising the existing spillway inlet walls and embankment parapet wall by 2 metres (6 ft 7 in). It is expected that the upgrade will be completed during 2014.

Following heavy rainfall in the catchment area, in January 2012 the dam was at its highest level since records commenced in 1986. It was estimated that water was flowing in the range of 2 metres (6 ft 7 in) over the dam spillway.

=== Recreation ===
Lake Clarrie Hall provides valuable public recreation including swimming, sailing, boating and freshwater fishing, including sports fishing for Australian bass. Boat access for electric outboard and paddle-powered craft is available at Crams Farm, at the southern end of the waterbody. Lake Clarrie Hall has been stocked with more than 358,000 Australian bass fingerlings over the past 10 years. A fishing licence is required to fish in the lake.

High levels of blue-green algae are common on the lake surface.

== Proposed raising of the dam wall ==
In December 2015, Approval was given by Tweed Shire Council to raise the dam wall by 8.5 metres, doubling its footprint and trebling its capacity. An environmental impact assessment is due to be completed in February 2021, and construction is not expected to begin until December 2023. 12 of 16 properties or part properties had already been purchased for the purpose of the project as of December 2020.

=== Ecological impact ===
According to the council's Flora and Fauna Survey and Preliminary Environmental Impact Assessment, 119.66 of the 223.10 hectares due to be inundated is dominated by native vegetation. Rainforest of high conservation value and nine threatened plant species (of which two prefer the area to be inundated) were found in the area to be affected.

Just under half of the native bushland to be inundated is designated key fauna habitat. 25 threatened animal species were discovered and seven of them depend on the tree hollows which were also found in the area due to be inundated.

=== Cultural heritage and inundation of archaeological sites ===
Raising the dam wall could affect 81 sites – including campsites, rock shelters, stone artifacts, knapping resources, grinding grooves sites and a possible Aboriginal scarred tree – identified in an Archaeological Assessment and Aboriginal Cultural Heritage Assessment conducted for the council.

== See also ==
- List of reservoirs and dams in Australia
- Mount Jerusalem National Park
