= The Bobby Limb Show =

- Also known as: The Mobil Limb Show
- Genre: Variety; Music television
- Directed by: Peter Benardos
- Presented by: Bobby Limb
- Country of origin: Australia
- Original language: English
- No. of episodes: 117

Production
- Producer: Alec Kellaway
- Running time: 50 minutes; 55 minutes

Original release
- Network: TCN-9
- Release: 1959 – 1964

The Bobby Limb Show is an early Australian television music/variety series which aired from 1959 to 1961, and was later re-titled (with minor format changes) as The Mobil Limb Show from 1961 to 1964. It was hosted by Bobby Limb, and was produced by the Nine Network's TCN-9. Episodes included music, dancing, and comedy sketches.

Regulars in The Bobby Limb Show included Limb's wife Dawn Lake, Buster Fiddess, Johnny O'Connor, Darryl Stewart, Bill Newman, The Delltones, Tikky Taylor, and The Bobby Limb Show Band.

Regular guests in The Mobil Limb Show included Leonard Teale, Gaynor Bunning and Noel Brophy. Many episodes of both series exist as kinescope recordings

Dawn Lake's enduring character was Ethel, first appearing in the early 1960s in The Mobil Limb Show. As a simple housewife talking over the fence to a neighbour she would say, "You tell 'em, luv!". This was Ethel's catchcry.
