= Adam's Woman =

1970 film

- Directed by: Philip Leacock
- Written by: Richard Fielding
- Story by: Lowell Barrington
- Produced by: Arthur M. Broidy; Louis F. Edelman
- Starring: Beau Bridges; Jane Merrow
- Cinematography: Bill Butler
- Edited by: Anthony Buckley
- Music by: Bob Young
- Production companies: SBP Films; Warner Bros.-Seven Arts
- Distributed by: Warner Bros.
- Release date: 19 March 1970
- Running time: 116 Minutes
- Countries: Australia; United States
- Language: English
- Budget: $2,500,000 or $2 million
- Box office: $15,000 (Australia)

Adam's Woman is a 1970 Australian-American historical drama film directed by Philip Leacock and starring Beau Bridges, Jane Merrow and John Mills. It has been called a "convict Western".

== Plot ==
In the 1840s, an American sailor ashore in Liverpool is wrongly convicted and sent to the penal colony in Sydney, Australia, where he engages in a battle of wills with the Governor. The Governor offers him a pardon if he helps pioneer new land for the growing colony. He marries an Irish woman, Bess, and together they establish a farm despite the harassment of bushrangers.

Opponents of the Governor persuade a visiting Crown commissioner, Lord Croydon, to revoke Adam's pardon. Adam attempts to escape but is arrested. Bess pleads his case, and Adam ultimately receives a full pardon.

== Cast ==
- Beau Bridges – Adam Beecher
- Jane Merrow – Bess
- John Mills – Sir Philip MacDonald
- James Booth – Dyson
- Andrew Keir – O'Shea
- Tracy Reed – Duchess
- Peter O'Shaughnessy – Barrett
- John Warwick Croyden
- Harry Lawrence – Muir
- Katy Wild – Millie
- Mark McManus – Nobby
- Harold Hopkins – Cosh
- Doreen Warburton – Anne
- Clarissa Kaye-Mason – Matron
- Peter Collingwood – Chaplain
- Tom Oliver – Stacey
- Stewart Ginn – Williams

== Production ==
The film was originally known as The Return of the Boomerang. It was announced in November 1965 as part of a four film slate by Motion Pictures International, a new company formed by Steve Broidy and Louis F. Edelman. In June 1966 it was reported that Lowell Barrington, author of the novel Return of the Boomerang had been signed by Broidy to write the script for Edelman, with filming to begin in the Australian summer.

In March 1967 Broidy said the film would be one of five he would make that year the others being The Fox, God's High Table, Ignatz and The Coasts of War. In April Edelman said that Lewis Allen would direct from a script by T. E. B. Clarke with filming to begin in October.

In February 1968 Eldeman announced that Philip Leacock would direct the film from a script by Clarke. The following month it was reported Richard Fielding was writing the script for Edelman with filming to begin "this fall".

By November 1968 the project was being made for Warner Bros.-Seven Arts and Beau Bridges, Jane Merrow, James Booth and John Mills were cast. The film was given a three-month schedule in Australia. In December Chips Rafferty was listed among the cast (but he does not appear in the final film.)

The film was titled Adam's Woman in December 1969.

=== Filming ===
The film was shot entirely in Australia with finance from Hollywood. The script, director, cinematographer and star were all imported. The film was shot in late 1968 and early 1969, on location in the small town of Cambewarra, near Nowra and the Shoalhaven River, and in the studio of Ajax Films. There were a number of movies being shot in Australia at the time including Squeeze a Flower and Ned Kelly.

== Reception ==
The film had its world premiere in Canberra in March 1970. Adam's Woman took $15,000 at the box office in Australia. Overseas reaction was not strong.

Warner Bros were sufficiently enthusiastic about early rushes to ask Lou Edelman if he had any other Australian-set projects. Edelman became enthusiastic about the play The One Day of the Year, by Alan Seymour, the rights to which were held by Tony Buckely. However, Buckley withdrew the project when Edelman wanted to cast American actors.
