= NLT Productions =

Australian production company

NLT Productions was an Australian production company formed in 1961 which made a number of films and TV series. It was founded in 1961 by entertainer Bobby Limb, talent manager Jack Neary (OAM, OBE) (born; John Edwin Neary; 19 January 1916 – 6 April 2000) and Les Tinker.

== Select credits ==
=== Television ===
- Bobby Limb's Sounds of the Seventies (1963-70)
- The Private World of Miss Prim (1966)
- The Barry Creyton Show (1967)
- Divorce Court (1967-68)
- The Unloved (1968)
- Australia's Celebrity Game (1969-70)
- The Rovers (1969–70)

=== Film ===
- Squeeze a Flower (1970)
- Wake in Fright (1971)

== See also ==
- List of film production companies
- List of television production companies
