= The Celluloid Heroes =

- Directed by: Donald Crombie and Robert Francis
- Written by: Donald Crombie and Robert Francis
- Produced by: Anthony Buckley
- Music by: Nigel Westlake
- Production company: Film Australia
- Distributed by: Screen Australia
- Release date: 1995
- Running time: 4 x 55 minutes
- Country: Australia
- Language: English

The Celluloid Heroes is a four-part Australian documentary series about the history of the cinema of Australia. The music score was composed by one of Australian composer Nigel Westlake. The original soundtrack recording was performed by the Melbourne Symphony Orchestra and produced for CD by Philip Powers for 1M1 Records.
