= Woobinda (Animal Doctor) =

- Starring: Don Pascoe
- Countries of origin: Australia; Germany
- Original language: English
- No. of episodes: 39

Production
- Producer: Roger Mirams
- Production companies: NLT Productions; Ajax Films; Fremantle International

Original release
- Network: ABC Television
- Release: 1969

Woobinda (Animal Doctor) is an Australian children's television series about a veterinarian in a fictitious town in rural New South Wales.

== Cast ==
=== Main cast ===
- Don Pascoe as John Stevens
- Lutz Hochstraate as Peter Fischer
- Sonia Hofmann as Tiggie Stevens
- Slim De Grey as Jack Johnson
- Bindi Williams as Kevin Stevens

=== Guest cast ===
- Frankie Davidson as Towtruck Driver
- Barbara Frawley as Miss Webber
- Edward Howell as Doctor
- Bobby Limb
- Chips Rafferty as Grazier (2 episodes)
- Chuck Faulkner (1 episode)
- Jack Thompson as Lenny (1 episode)
- Jacki Weaver (1 episode)
- John Meillon (1 episode)
- Kerry McGuire (1 episode)
- Max Phipps
- Reg Gorman (1 episode)
- Richard Meikle (1 episode)
- Sheila Kennelly (1 episode)
- Steve Dodd
- Stewart Ginn (1 episode)

== Production ==
Writers included Ron McClean and Michael Wright.
