= Uki, New South Wales =

Village in New South Wales, Australia

Uki
- Town
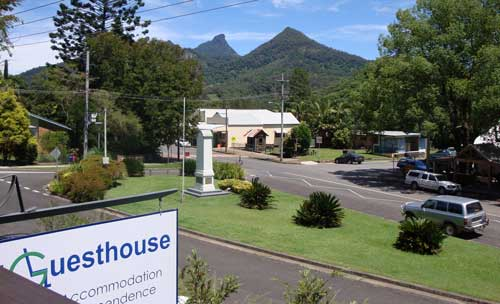
- ANZAC Memorial and village. Historic "Sweetnam's Humpy" is visible in the mid-distance and Mt Warning is visible in the background.

- Coordinates: 28°25′S 153°20′E
- Country: Australia
- State: New South Wales
- LGA: Tweed Shire
- Location: 8 km (5.0 mi) S of Murwillumbah

Government
  - State electorate: Lismore
  - Federal division: Richmond

Population
  - Total: 765 (2011 census)
- Postcode: 2484

Uki (/ˈjuːkaɪ/ YOO-kye) is a village situated near Mount Warning in the Tweed Valley of far northern New South Wales, Australia in the Tweed Shire. The Ngandowal and Minyungbal speaking people of the Bundjalung people are the traditional owners of the Tweed region, including Tumbulgum, and the surrounding areas.

There are three approaches to Uki village; from the North it is approximately 15 minutes by road south of the main township of Murwillumbah along the Kyogle Road and 4 km past the turnoff to the World Heritage listed Mount Warning National Park, from the South West along the Kyogle Road from Lismore, Kyogle and Nimbin and from the East along Smiths Creek Road linking Uki to the village of Stokers Siding and the Tweed Valley Way to coastal towns including Brunswick Heads and Byron Bay. It is also possible to travel to Mullumbimby from Uki using gravel back roads and fire trails through the Mount Jerusalem National Park.

Clarrie Hall Dam is located 10 km from Uki, and the area is described as "one of New South Wales’ finest fishing destinations".

== Origin of place name ==
There are a number of theories regarding the origin of the name Uki. Some of these are that the name is taken from the Bundjalung language words yugoi, which means 'bandicoot' (this name origin is also shared with the nearby Mount Uki), or yaguy, which means 'a small water plant with an edible root'. An alternate theory is that it is a European creation, with the cedar getters in the region marking their prime timber, for export to the United Kingdom, with UK 1 (United Kingdom - grade 1) which slowly converted to Uki among the locals there who colloquially named the town.

== Today ==
Prominent buildings in the village include the historical 'Old Butter Factory' and a primary school. There are several stores, including a post office, general store, bakery, pharmacy, and laundromat, as well as cafés. The Mount Warning Hotel is a weekend lunch 'stop-over' for touring motorbikes and those out for a weekend drive. It burned down in February 2013, but was re-built and was able to re-open in mid-2015. Uki is the place on which the village of Yurriki in Robert G. Barrett's book The Godson is based.

== History ==
Early pioneers were either timber cutters (usually Australian red cedar) or dairy farmers. Photos of The Sisters and Mt Uki near Uki in the early 1900s show these cleared of nearly all vegetation.

Following a rationalisation of the dairy industry in the 1960s, many farmers stopped their production of milk and turned to beef cattle. This type of farming remains a feature of the region today. Sugarcane farming is a prominent agricultural activity in the Tweed Valley. Tropical fruits have also been grown in the area. The last remaining sawmill is located on Smith's Creek Road, north east of the village.

== Demographics ==
In the 2011 census, Uki recorded a population of 765 people, 50.5% female and 49.5% male.

The median age of the Uki population was 45 years, 8 years above the national median of 37.

73.4% of people living in Uki were born in Australia. The other top responses for country of birth were England 6%, New Zealand 3.7%, United States of America 1.3%, Netherlands 0.7%, France 0.5%.

88.5% of people spoke only English at home; the next most common languages were 1.6% German, 0.5% Hebrew, 0.4% French, 0.4% Swedish, 0.4% Spanish.

== Sport ==
The Uki Pythons Soccer Club is located just out of Uki and most of the players are from the village. In 2015, Uki had 2 Senior Men's teams, 1 Senior Women's team, 5 Junior competitive teams (including 1 all girls team) and 6 Junior Miniroos Teams. The club's colours are Dark Green with Yellow trim or Yellow Shirt with Green trim and Dark Green shorts and socks. Uki also offers community touch football through the summer months. All teams are local and various levels of ability are represented. Ages range from 6 to 60.

== Gallery ==
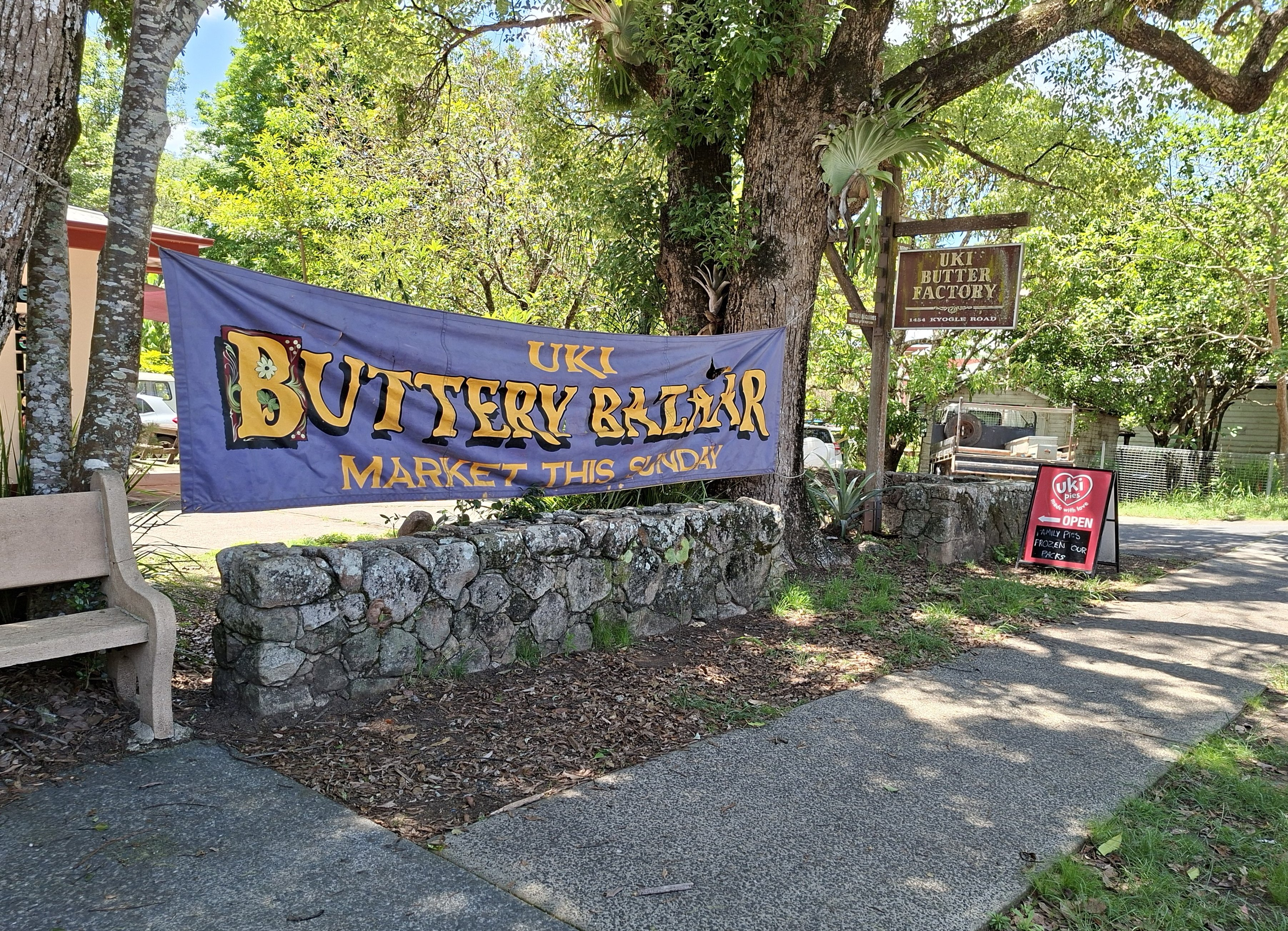
Street signage in Uki, November 2025

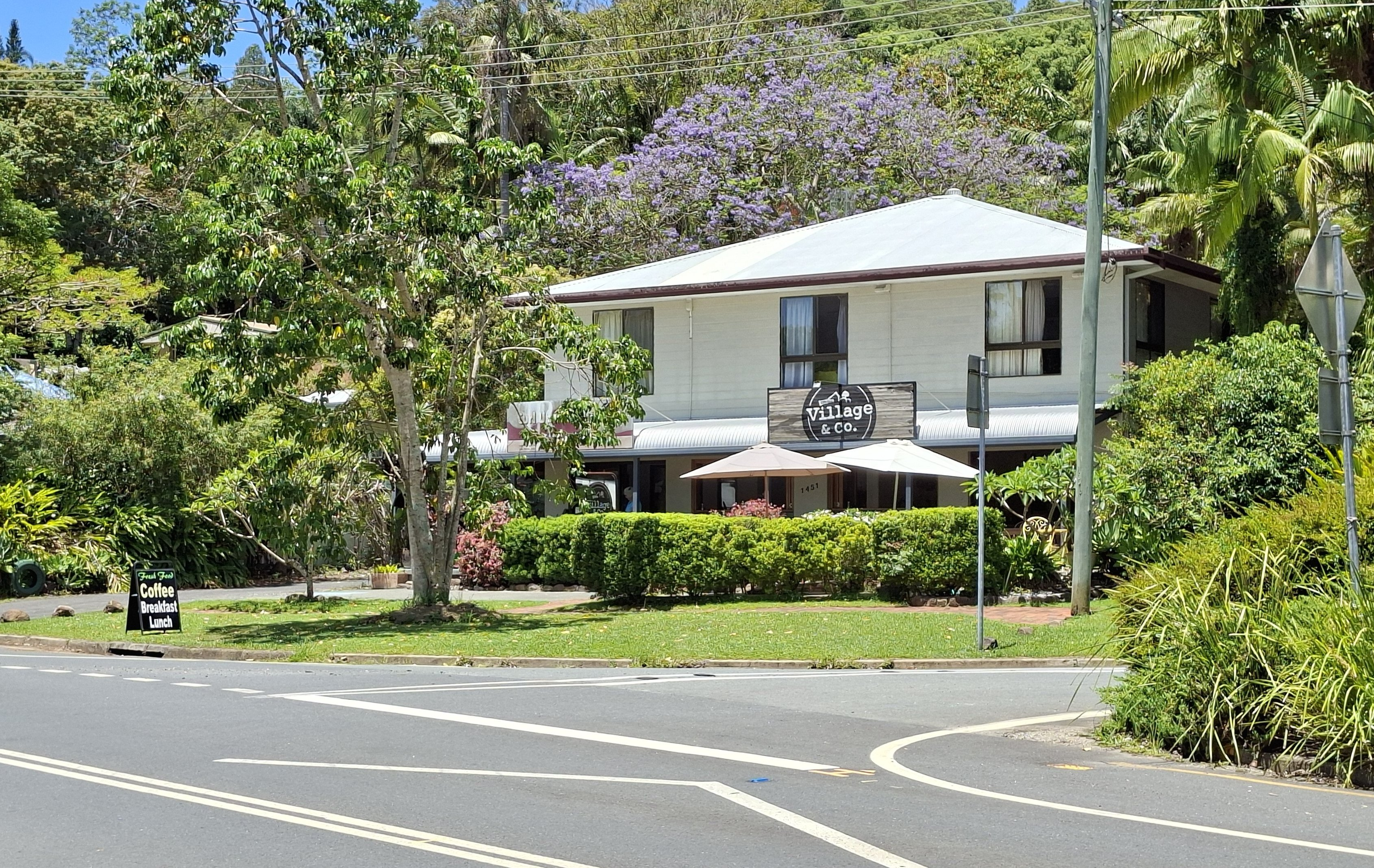
Street scene in Uki, November 2025

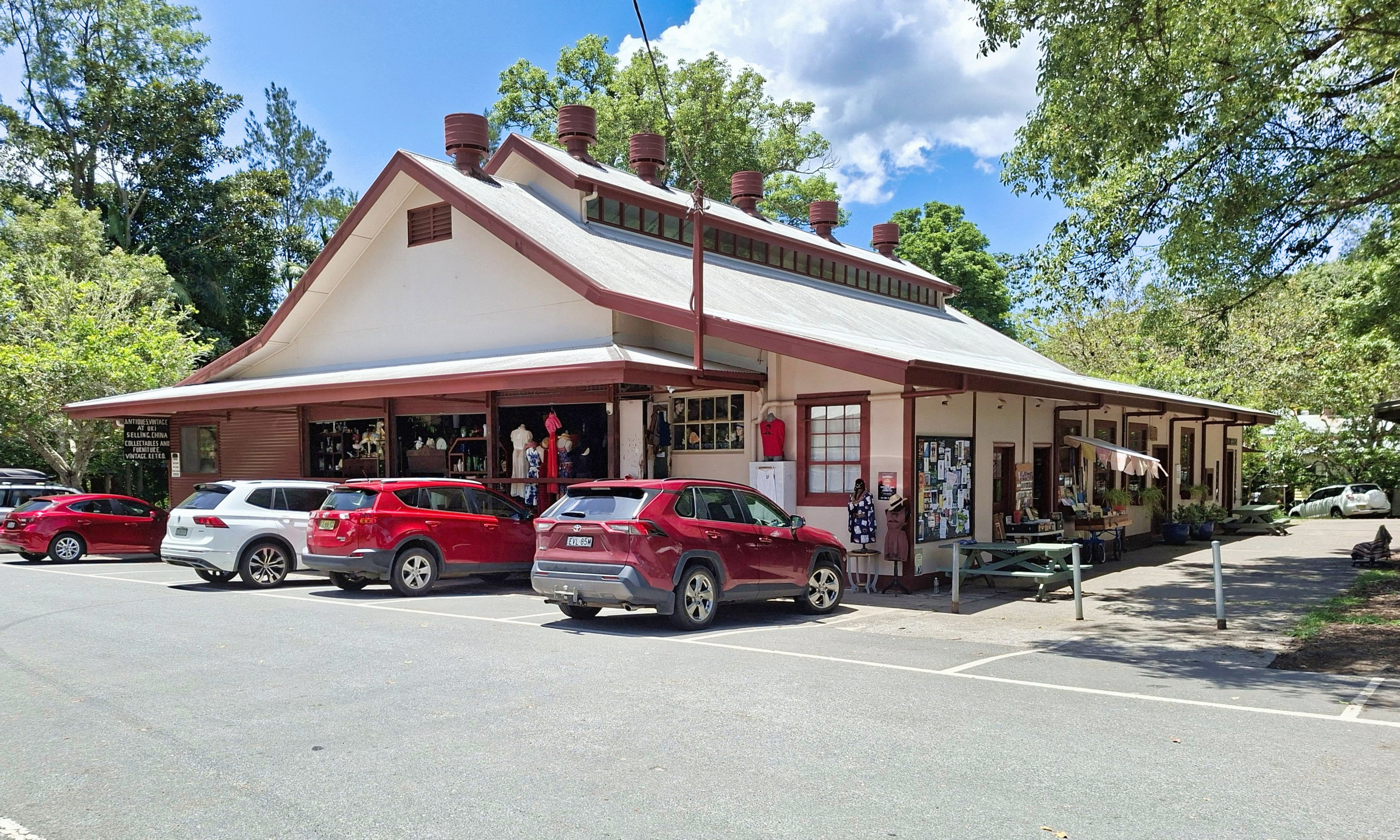
The Butter Factory in Uki, November 2025

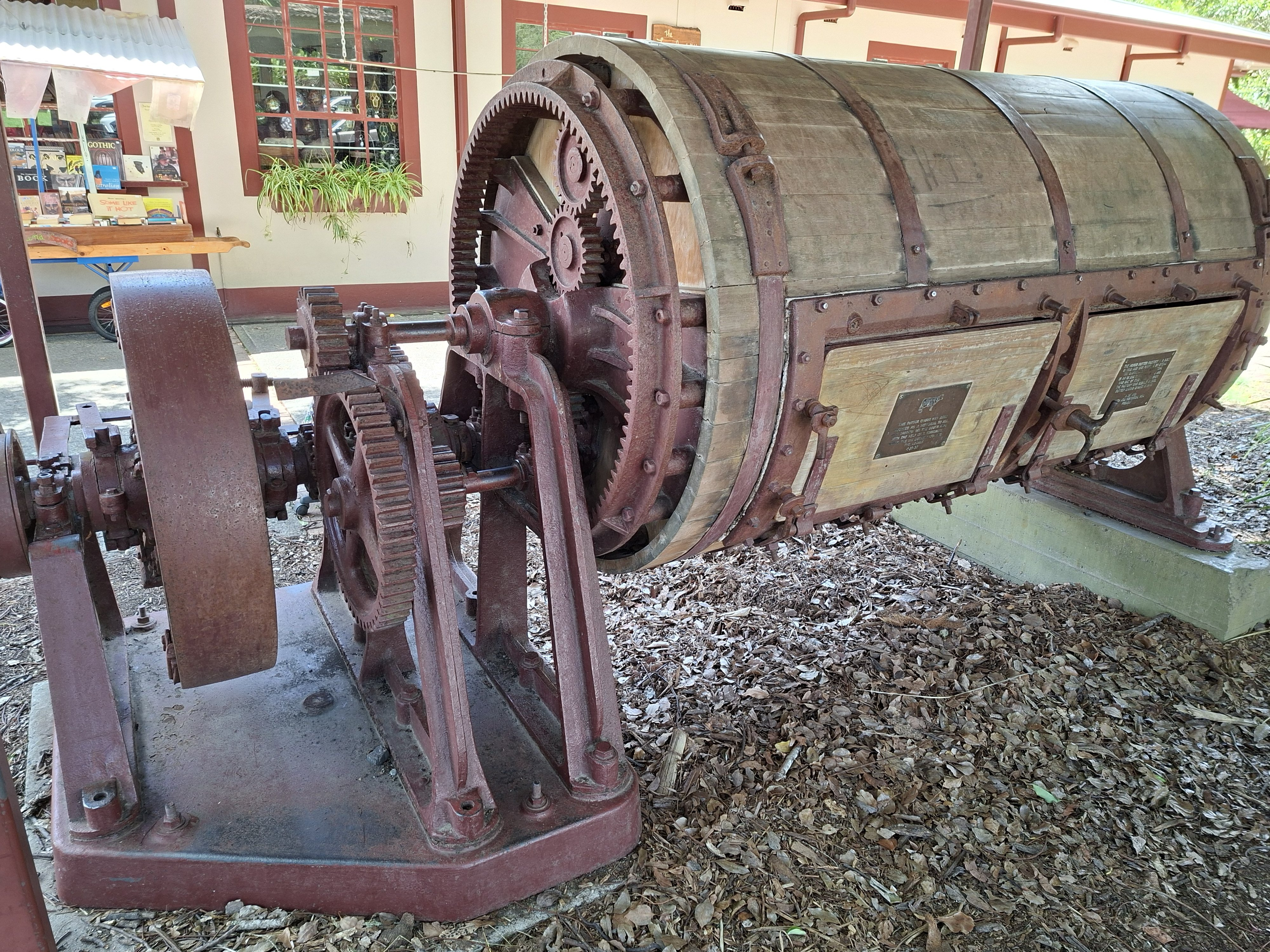
Historic butter churn in Uki, November 2025

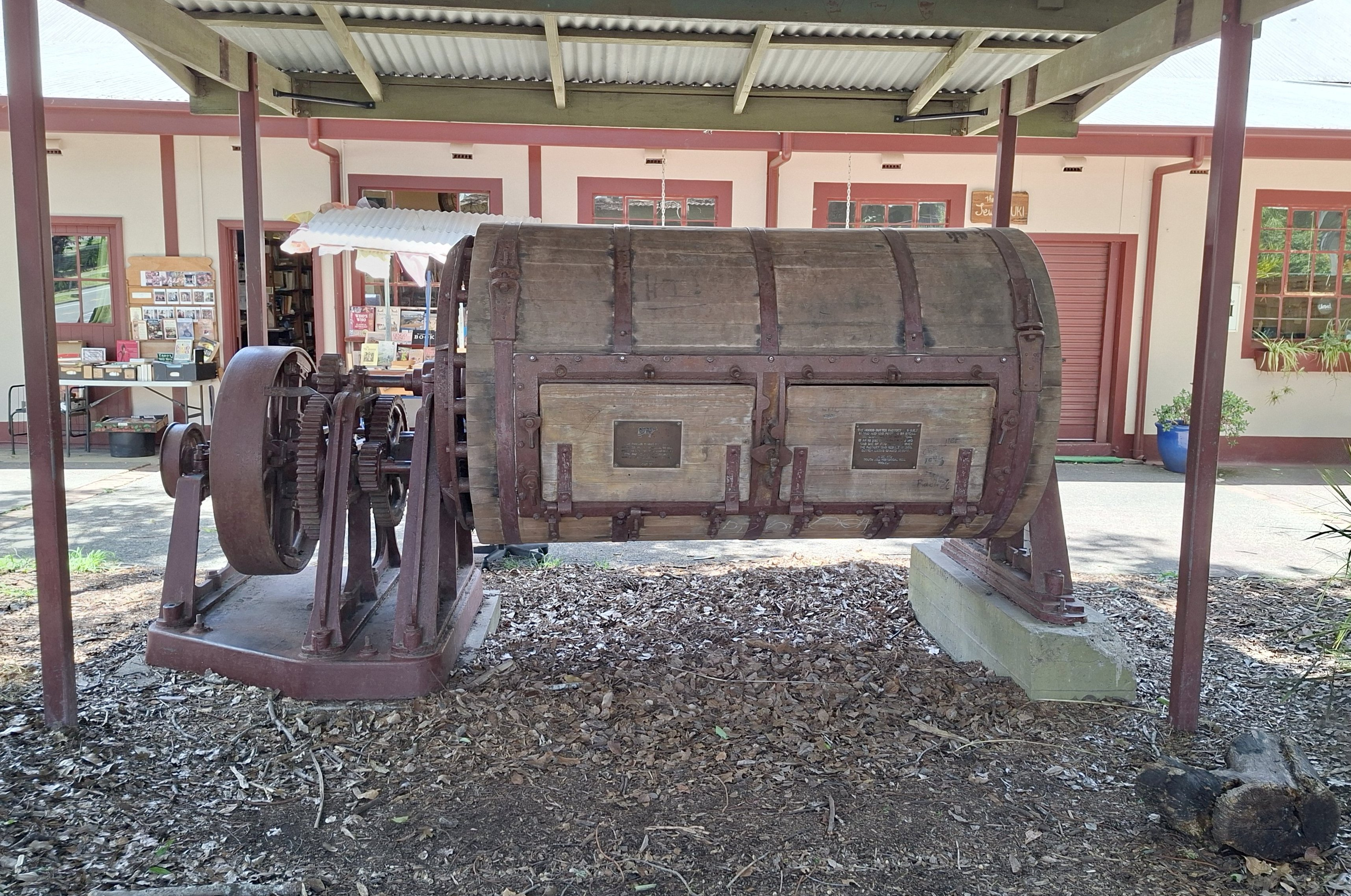
Historic butter churn outside the Butter Factory in Uki, November 2025

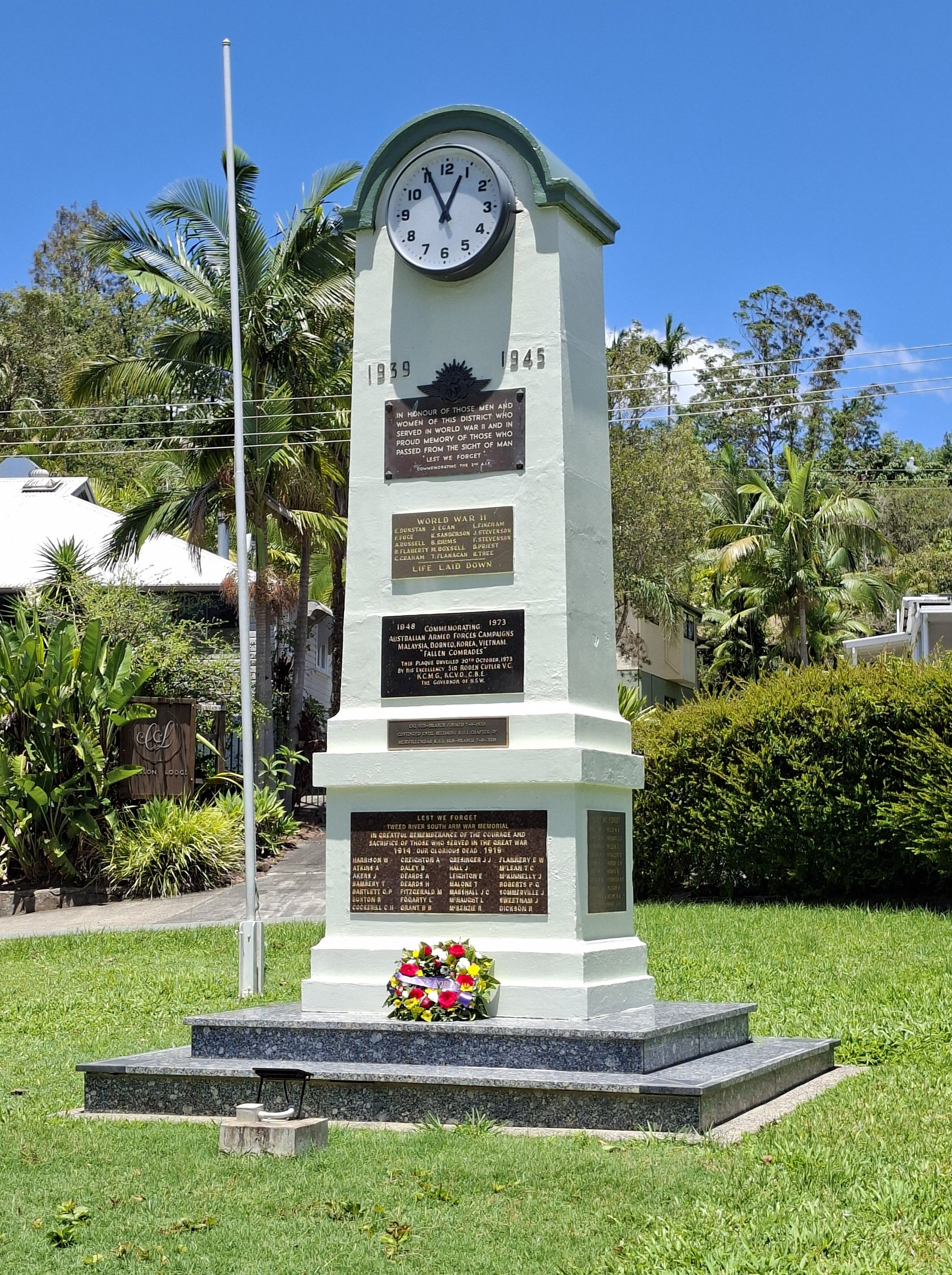
War memorial in Uki, November 2025

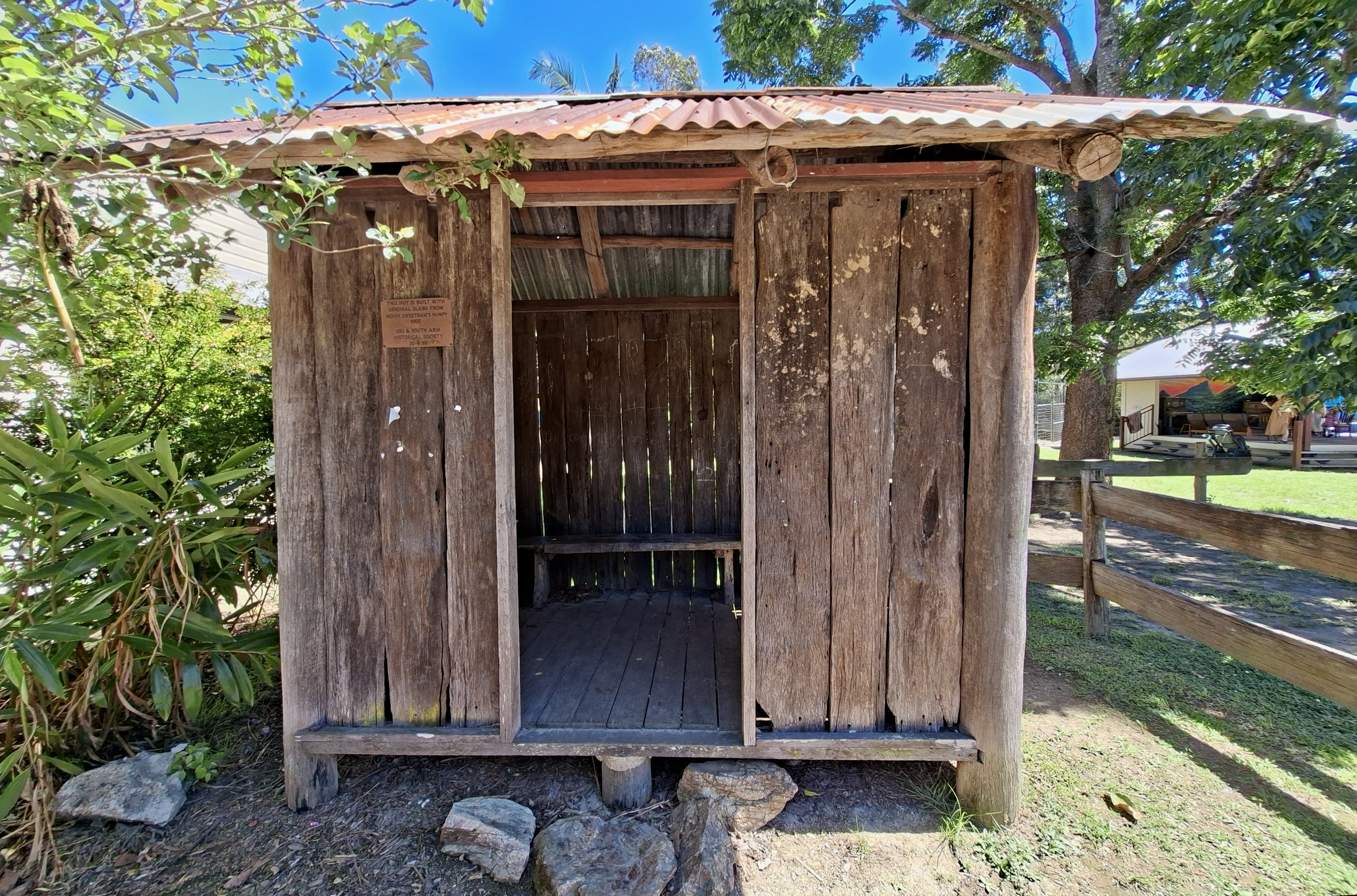
Rebuilt timber hut in Uki, New South Wales, Australia, November 2025

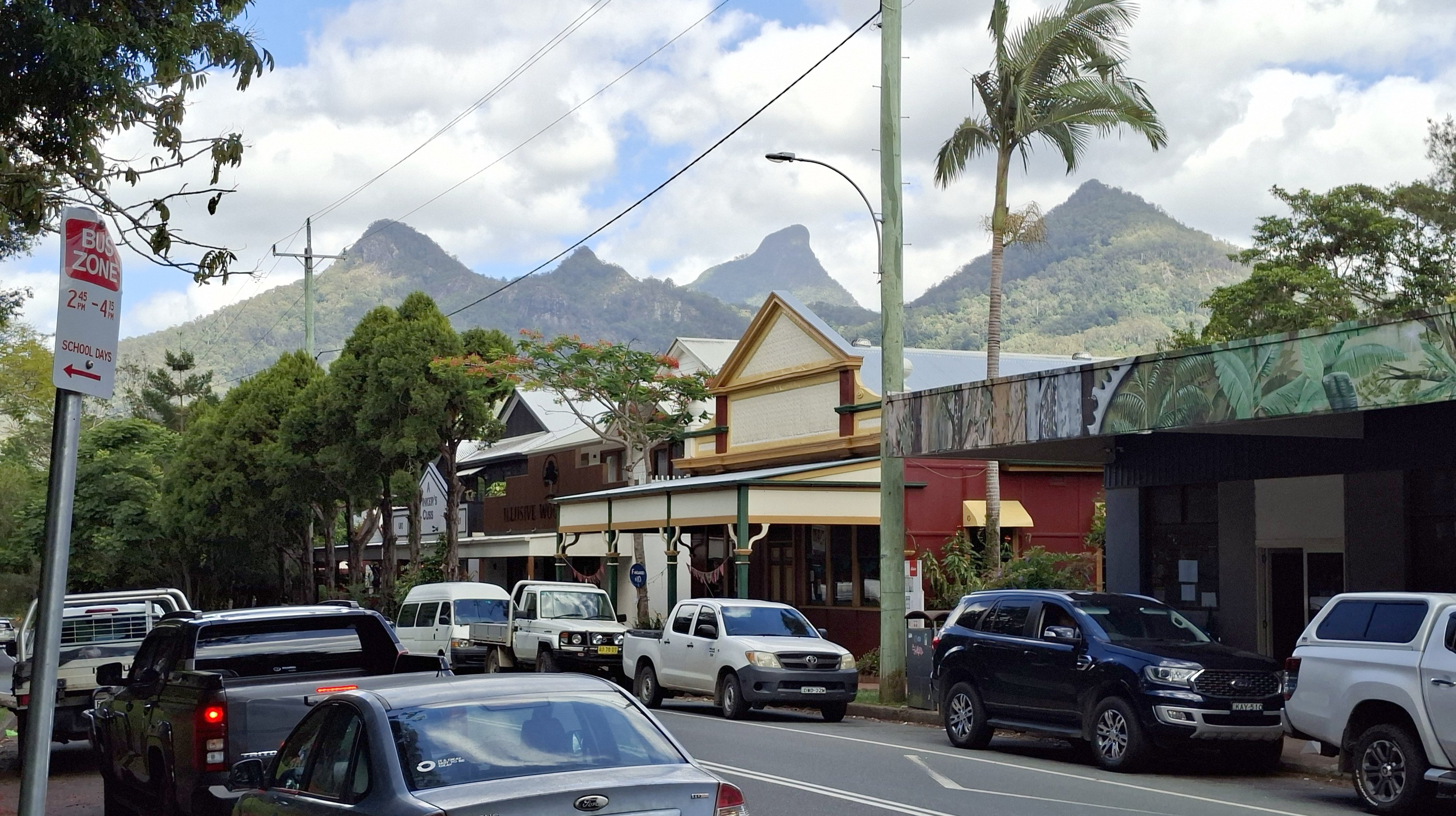
Main street of Uki, New South Wales, Australia, November 2025

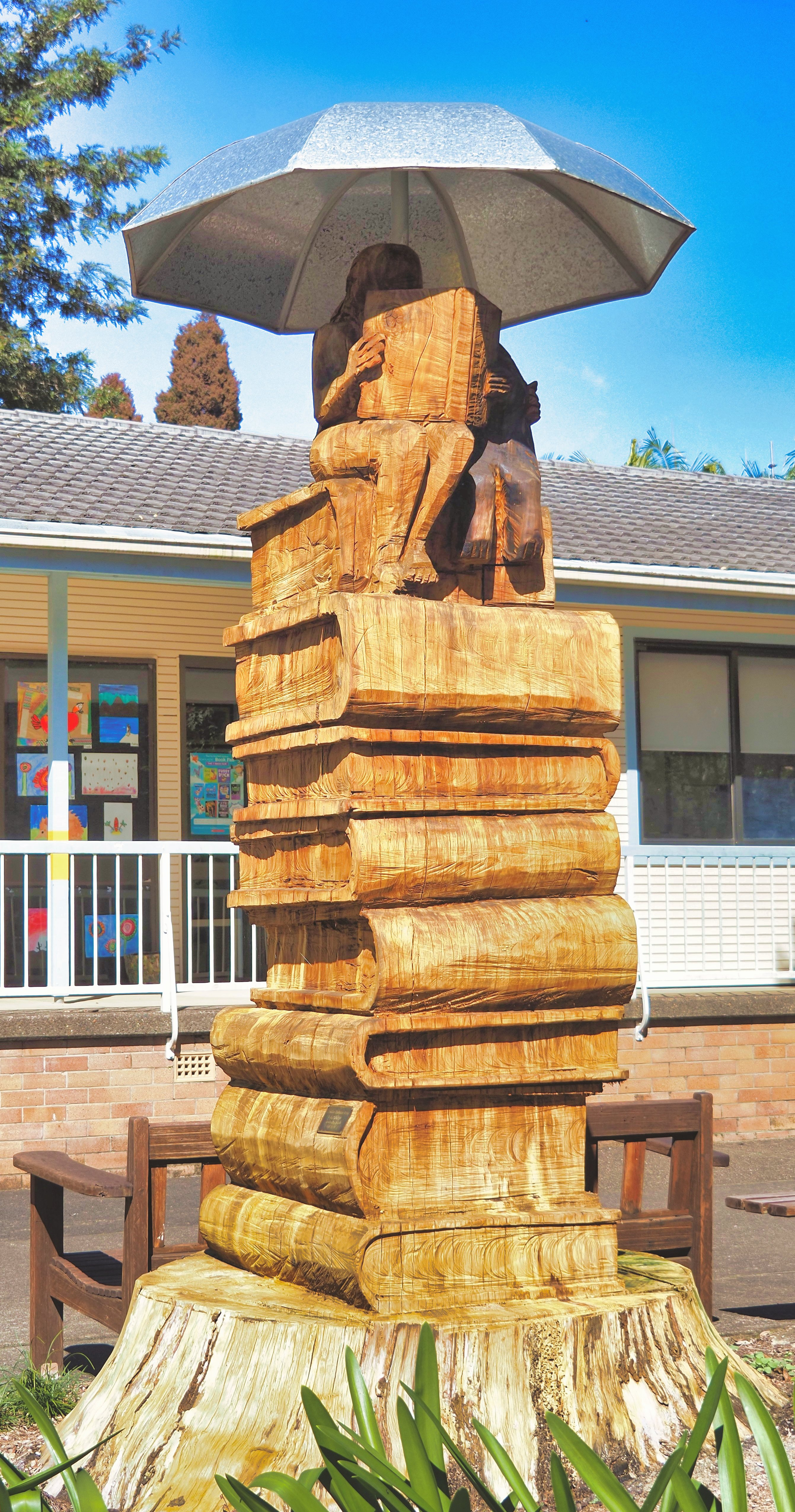
Uki sculpture by Matt George, in grounds of Uki Public School (from felled hoop pine, sculpted in situ)

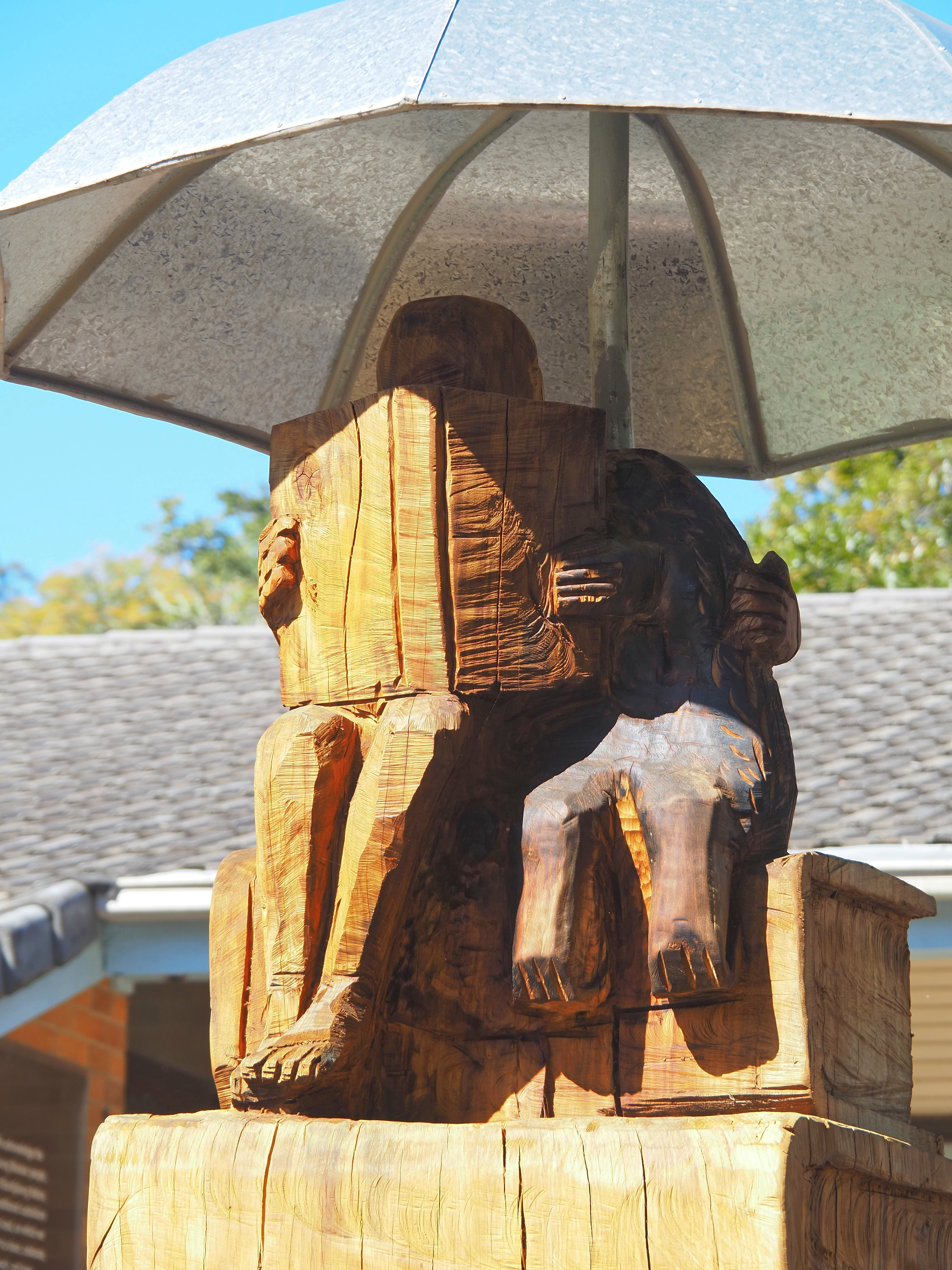
Uki sculpture by Matt George - detail

== Notable people ==
- David Johnstone (1938 - 2017) established Mandala, the first gay intentional community, 6 kilometres (3.7 mi) from Uki in 1973
