= Bobby Limb =

Australian entertainer (1924–1999)

Bobby Limb AO OBE
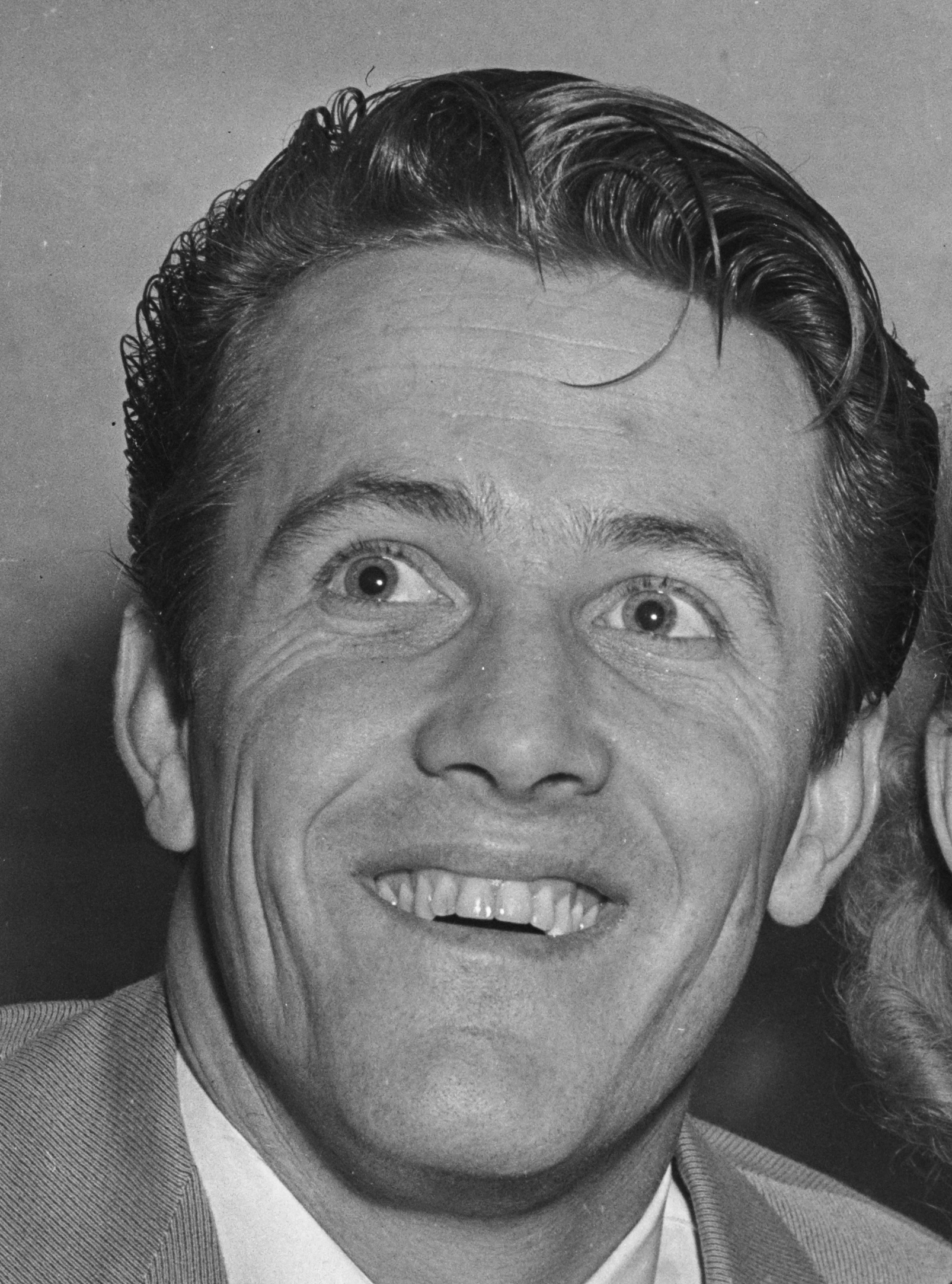
- Bobby Limb, Clovelly, Sydney, 1952
- Born: Robert Limb; 10 November 1924; Adelaide, South Australia, Australia
- Died: 11 September 1999 (aged 74); Sydney, New South Wales, Australia
- Occupations: Entertainer; radio personality; television personality; comedian; presenter; band leader; musician; production company co-founder
- Spouse: Dawn Lake
- Musical career
- Genres: Jazz
- Instrument: Saxophone

Robert "Bobby" Limb (10 November 1924 – 11 September 1999) was an Australian-born entertainment pioneer, comedian, band leader and musician and legend of radio, television and theatre of the 1960s and 1970s, he also founded the film and TV production company NLT Productions, with Jack Neary and Les Tinker. One of its main products was adventure serial The Rovers, which was aimed at breaking the international market.

== Early days ==
Bobby Limb was born in Adelaide, South Australia and entered a show business career beginning in 1941, at the age of 17, when he became a saxophone player with various dance bands around his home city of Adelaide. His bright personality soon made him a bandleader and comedian. By 1952, Bobby was already one of Australia's leading entertainers, with a fan-club on radio station 2UW, which boasted 35,000 teenage members.

== Radio and television host ==
Robert Limb conducting a concert in Darling Harbour, Sydney

He appeared in the satirical radio program The Idiot Weekly in 1958 and 1959, alongside such players as Spike Milligan, Ray Barrett and John Bluthal and John Ewart but was better known for his own radio, and later TV shows.

His most successful television shows included his self-titled The Bobby Limb Show (later called the Mobil-Limb Show), Australia's first national television show, and Bobby Limb's The Sound of Music, which ran for nine years 1963–1972, being the country's top-rated show for most of that time. Limb switched with his program from TCN Channel 9 to TEN10 in exactly the same timeslot on Friday nights. Channel 9 then picked up the younger Barry Crocker from TEN10 where he'd been hosting a similar program called "Say it with Music", and placed this into almost exactly the same timeslot with the same "Sound of Music" name on Friday nights. Crocker's initial success waned, but both versions were axed within a few years as the format had had its run.

== Marriage ==
Bobby Limb married fellow entertainer and singer Dawn Lake in 1953, and often appeared with her. As a couple, they became iconic within the Australian entertainment industry. So popular was their appeal in their native land that Bert Newton called them "Australia's Lucille and Desi".

== Support and foundations ==
He promoted and supported young musicians, such as the group Human Nature.

He supported Diabetes Australia, and founded the Bobby Limb Foundation to help sufferers of diabetes.

== Death and legacy ==
On 11 September 1999, Bobby Limb died of cancer, a condition he had previously suffered and apparently beaten. At Limb's funeral, the former Whitlam government minister Doug McClelland said that Bobby Limb was to the Australian entertainment industry what Sir Donald Bradman was to cricket, Sir Charles Kingsford Smith was to aviation, Dame Joan Sutherland was to opera, and Dr Victor Chang was to surgery.

== Popular appeal ==
Bobby Limb's enduring popularity was based on a solid 'middle-of-the-road' musical format, knock-about (never 'way-out') comedy, and a 'something for the whole family' style wholesomeness. In the late 1950s, Limb took up the torch of supplying middle-Australia's tastes in entertainment from that of radio personality of Jack Davey, but Limb's star began to fade in the 1970s when the TV audience shifted its tastes away from family 'variety' shows towards wall-to-wall 80's style pop-music, home-grown soap-opera like A Country Practice and Neighbours and most especially harder-edged, satirical comedy like The Aunty Jack Show.

Bobby Limb remained a hit with older Australian audiences but his later appearances were almost entirely off-screen, held at various live venues around the nation, like clubs and theatres, often in connection with charity fund-raising.

Limb released several recordings showcasing his musicianship, including "Bobby Limb's 'Sound Of Music' Soundtrack", "Honeycomb", "Bobby Limb's Family Favourites" and "Mockingbird Hill".

== Conversion to Christianity ==
In 1983, following many professional and personal problems, Bobby Limb became a born-again Christian.

== Awards ==
He won a total of 11 Logie Awards, including the 1964 Gold Logie, awarded to the Most Popular Personality on Australian Television.

He won a Mr Show Business award in the USA.

In 1983, he won the Australian Father of the Year award.

== British and Australian honours ==
In 1967 he was made an Officer of the Order of the British Empire (OBE) for his efforts in entertaining Australian troops in the Vietnam War. In 2000, nine months after his death, he was appointed an Officer of the Order of Australia (AO) "For service to the Australian entertainment industry, to tourism, and to the community, particularly through support for charitable organisations". Although announced posthumously, the award was made with effect from 2 September 1999.

== Filmography ==
=== Film ===
Year	Title	Role	Type
1961	Official Opening	Self	TV movie
1970	Squeeze a Flower	Bobby Lambert	Feature film
1972	Sunstruck	Bill	Feature film
1980	We'll Be Back After the Break	Himself	TV movie
1983	Skin Deep	Himself	TV movie

=== Television ===
Year	Title	Role	Type
1954	Showcase		TV series
1959	The Bobby Limb Show (akaThe Mobil Limb Show)	Self	TV series
1967	Bobby Limb's Sounds of the Seventies	Host	TV series
1969	Woobinda, Animal Doctor		TV series
1972	Buster Fides Memorial Concert	Self	TV special
1972	ALP: It's Time	Himself	Video short
1963-72	Bobby Limb's Sound of Music	Host	TV series
1975	Celebrity Squares	Himself	TV series, 7 episodes
1975, 1978	This Is Your life	Himself	TV series (1975 for himself, 1978 for Dawn Lake)
	The Saturday Show	Himself	TV series
1980	Celebrity Tattle Tales	Himself	TV series

=== As crew ===
Year	Title	Role	Type
1969	The Rose and Crown	Director & Producer	TV play
1969-70	The Rovers	Producer	TV series
1995	Peter Allen: The Boy From Oz	Special thank you	TV documentary

== Radio ==
Year	Title	Role	Type
1958-59	The Idiot Weekly	Himself	Radio show
