= Trocadero, Newtown =

Former cinema in Newtown, Sydney, New South Wales, Australia

Trocadero
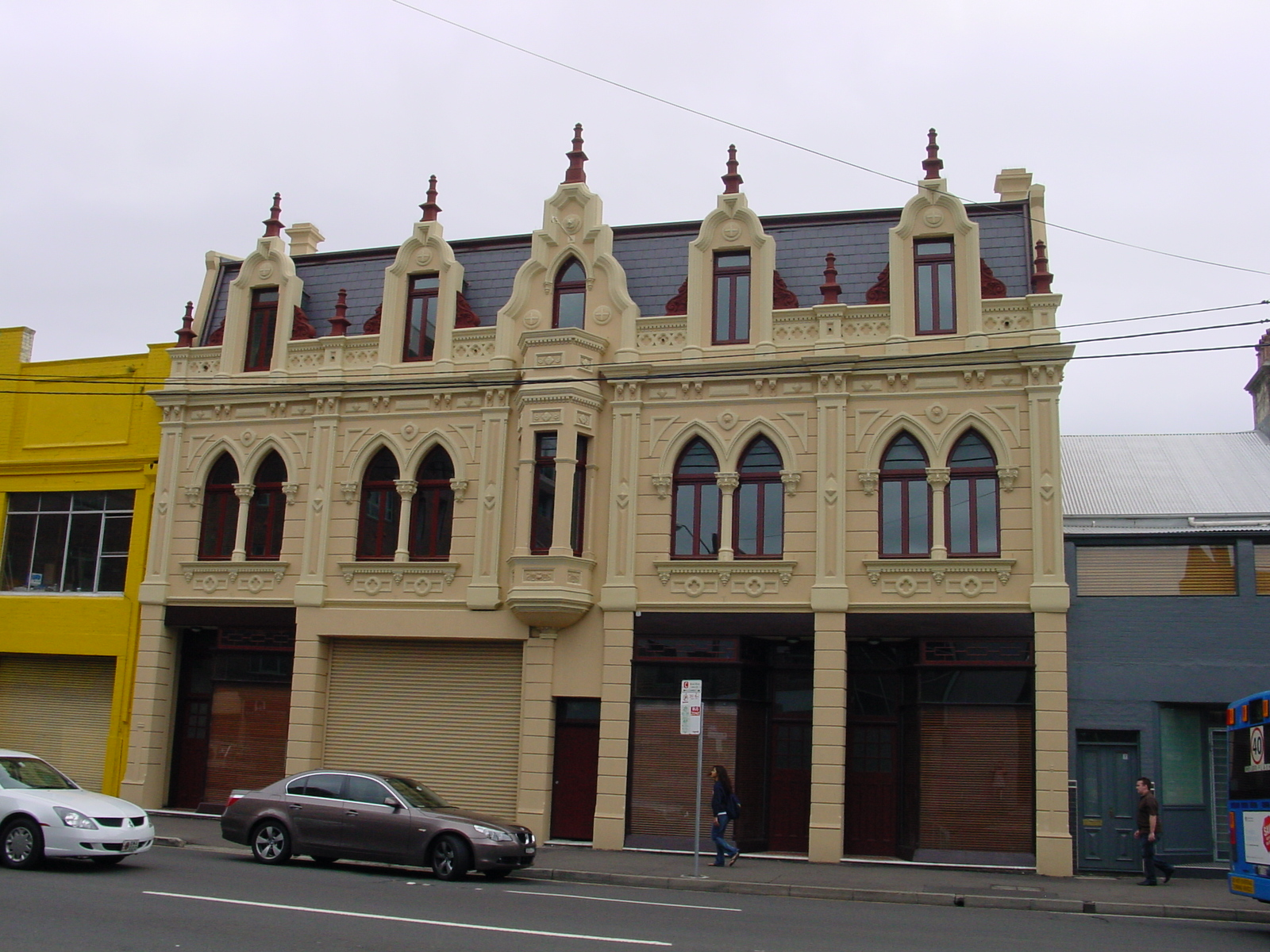
- The Trocadero in 2007 following restoration

- Location within New South Wales Location within Australia
- 33.8924°S 151.1855°E
- Location: 69-77 King Street, Newtown, City of Sydney, New South Wales, Australia

History
- Built: 1857–1889

Site notes
- Architect(s): Albert F. Myers and William P. Hendry Architects.
- Owner: Moore Theological College

New South Wales Heritage Register
- Official name: Trocadero; Trocadero Hall; The Trocadero Skating Rink; Properts Building; Fuel VFX
- Type: state heritage (built)
- Designated: 10 March 2000
- Reference no.: 1380
- Type: Skating Rink Roller
- Category: Recreation and Entertainment
- Builders: Fallick and Murgatroyd

Trocadero is a heritage-listed former cinema, event venue, dance hall, roller skating rink, motor workshop, music venue and now office building at 69-77 King Street, Newtown, City of Sydney, New South Wales, Australia. It was designed by Albert F. Myers and William P. Hendry Architects and built in 1889 by Fallick and Murgatroyd, incorporating an earlier building from c. 1857. It has housed children's cancer charity CanTeen since 2014. It is also known as Trocadero Hall and the Properts Building. It was added to the New South Wales State Heritage Register on 10 March 2000.

== History ==
Trocadero Hall (Properts Building) was built for Frederick Ferrier as a skating rink in 1889. It was built on Lots 1 and 2 and parts of Lots 2 and 4 of the Camperdown Terrace, which had been subdivided in 1841. The site was generally vacant at the time of construction apart from a c. 1857-69 rendered brick terrace house on lot 3, about two thirds of which was incorporated into the new building, with only the front rooms replaced.

The Trocadero was built during the boom economy of the late 1880s in response to a fad for indoor roller skating. The Sands Directory includes listings for at least 25 roller skating rinks in Sydney for the years 1889 & 1890. The Trocadero was reputed to be the biggest and best. It was certainly very elaborate and was purpose built as a skating rink unlike many others.

During the depression of the 1890s most rinks closed. In 1891 Sands lists only two rinks under "Places of Amusement". The Trocadero closed in 1893. It was left empty until coach builder Sydney Simpson bought the building in 1895 and used it for his own business while leasing space to several other small businesses.

In 1903, the building re-opened as Williams Skating Rink and Music Hall, having been thoroughly renovated. The extent of redecoration at this time is not known but the spaces between the rink and the shops on King Street was completely re-arranged including the entry through no 73 King St. There was a separate entry for the second floor which was used as factory spaces and a residence.

It was purchased by the Grace family (of Grace Bros department stores) in 1909 and renamed Elite Rink and Cafe Trocadero. The building later operated at various times as the Trocadero Picture Palace and as a venue for vaudeville shows and boxing. The Sydney University Women's Settlement used the upper club room as a centre for soldiers wives and mothers between 1916 and 1922.

Propert's Motor Body Company Limited moved into No 73 in 1920 and leased the hall as part of their workshops in 1927. By 1922 Propert's were the major motorcar works in the area with some 60 employees. They purchased the building in 1945 and continued its occupation until the firm's closure in 1979, after which time a motor repair business occupied the site.

In 1976, the building was purchased by the Anglican Church of Australia for the Moore Theological College. In 1981, they leased the building to a secondhand furniture business. The building was vacated for a planned fire safety renovation in 1994, and subsequently remained disused and neglected for many years until the college carried out an extensive restoration of the building in 2006.

In February 2014, it was leased as offices to children's cancer charity CanTeen. The college advertised the building for sale in 2017, ultimately selling the building to CanTeen for $13 million.

The shops to King Street have been utilized by many different occupants and businesses since construction in 1889 including refreshment rooms, confectioners, clothing shops, bootmaker, saddler and second hand furniture showroom. The original billiard saloon and club rooms have been used by various factories, the soldiers wives and mothers, residence and studio.

== Description ==
The Trocadero consists of a three-storey commercial/residential building facing King Street, and a large hall at the rear with access to both King and Campbell Streets. The two sections are linked by a two-storey vestibule flanked by service spaces.

The southern section of the building facing King Street is of rendered brick construction with a mansard roof clad in corrugated steel roofing. The King Street facade is built in a highly decorated Flemish style overlaid with Victoria Free Gothic style details. The arrangement is five bays wide and symmetrical about an oriel window at first floor level. However, at ground level the central opening has been altered so that the western pier no longer connects to the ground as it originally did.

The facade is divided into three levels. At ground level there are three shop fronts, the two eastern ones being original with fine timber framing and large areas of glass. The entry doors to these two shops are set back from the facade, a detail typical of the period. The western shopfront is a replacement from the mid 20th century. The adjacent shop front has been removed, the opening enlarged and a roller shutter installed. At the first floor level the windows are Gothic in form and are arranged symmetrically about the central oriel window. At the second floor level, elaborate Flemish style gabled dormer windows project from the mansard roof above a parapet.

Externally the skating rink/hall is of face brick construction with circular arched window openings. The rear elevation to Campbell Street is symmetrical in arrangement with a classical appearance. There is evidence of a covered verandah having been removed from the skating rink level of this elevation. At street level the openings have been altered several times with the installation of roller shutters and fire egress doors. Windows introduced below the two central arched windows at the skating rink level during the mid twentieth century have caused structural instability in the outer brick skin of the wall due to the lack of suitable lintels. Semi-circular arched windows are arranged at regular intervals along the eastern and western walls of the hall. Windows have been introduced during the mid 20th century.

At the rear of the easternmost shop is the substantial remaining portion of an earlier terrace house. This was built of much softer and redder brick than the rest of the building, and is thickly rendered and marked out as ashlar. This terrace house still shares its roof with its pair on the neighbouring allotment.

The interior finishes are generally of plastered brickwork and the ceilings of timber boarding. The floors of the shops are of concrete but with upper floors timber. The ceilings in the former billiard saloon feature very bold diamond shaped panels of timber boarding and ventilated metal ceiling roses. There is evidence of the original location of the stairs behind the westernmost shop and the second shop from the east. The two staircases appear to have been moved from their original 1889 location and re-configured to suit the new location. Both are of timber with fine newel posts and turned balusters. There is also evidence of the cupola roof structure over the centre of the large second floor room.

The spaces immediately behind the original shop front rooms have been altered extensively except for the remains of the terrace already mentioned and the high top-lit vestibule which connects the front of the building with the former skating rink hall. This vestibule retains its clerestory windows and roof structure and evidence of stairs on the east and west walls to a now removed landing and doorways.

Internally the eastern terrace survives relatively intact beyond the front shops and retains its fine mid C19th geometric timber stair and most of its joinery, flooring, plasterwork and one chimney piece.

Beyond the front range of building is a large timber floored iron roofed hall. The roof sheeting is visible from below and is supported by a row of fine wrought iron trusses, spanning clear across the space. These trusses in turn support a raised central roof with clerestory windows either side extending almost the full length of the hall. The trusses are fixed at their supports by iron straps bolted through the walls. Remains of a perimeter gallery with timber floor and cast and wrought iron brackets survives but with the balustrade missing. The gallery brackets are also fixed to the iron straps. Evidence exists for the original location of the stairs from this gallery to the north end of the space. The northern half of the hall is filled with a makeshift mezzanine structure at this gallery level while the southern half is open.

The northern end of the hall floor retains the remains of the narrow boarded floor which followed the line of the roller skating path around the hall. The remainder of this floor is either covered or replaced with later material.

The walls t the hall are divided into regular bays by classical pilasters with Corinthian capitals and a high base. The walls are plastered brickwork. Within most of the bays are arched recesses above the gallery level and square ones below. The main cornice to the walls has fine moulded plaster medallions, some of the recesses are pierced by original windows (some sheeted externally). Or later windows. At each end of the hall is a raised cornice section on pilasters surmounted by a large semi-circular fanlight fitted with timber windows. Evidence exists of the picture theatre use. Much of the damage to plasterwork appears to result from the most recent use as a second hand furniture shop. There are regular gaslight outlets around the walls.

Beneath the large hall and accessed from it by a broad timber stair is a concrete floored space with a roller shuttered access door and another timber door to Campbell Street. The space extends to approximately half the length of the hall above. The walls are plastered brickwork with later infill work at the north east corner in painted brickwork. The ceiling is generally boarded and where exposed the roof structure above is packed with sawdust between the joists, presumably as acoustic insulation against the skating rink. This structure is supported on plain steel columns.

=== Modifications and dates ===
- 1857: Pair of terraces constructed-on part of site, remain as visible part of building structure.
- 1888: Trocadero Skating Rink opened
- c. 1903: Building remodelled - stairs relocated and rebuilt, new toilets. Offices, salon, bathrooms, refreshment rooms demolished or substantially altered. A party wall built between 1st and 2nd floors of westernmost shops. Rear of westernmost shop altered to include residence.
- 1910: Central entry and adjoining shop altered (may have been in 1903)
- 1912: Adaption to picture show use. Upper gallery entrance to hall converted to projection room, alteration or removal of stairs to gallery from vestibule probable at this time. Screen hung from truss northern end of hall.
- 1916-1922: Installation of electricity.
- c. 1920-1928: Large opening between vestibule and hall, steel beams installed, stairs and projection room removed (probable), sub-floor structure of rink replaced with steel structure to support increased loads for car building business.
- 1949: Shopfront No. 76 altered.
- 1957: Alteration to windows King Street facade.
- 1958: Installation exhaust ducts and fans. Toilets and wash basin -northern end.
- 1959: Partitions to 1st floor
- 1960: Covered way 1st floor. Catwalk from 1857 terrace to central stairway.
- 1970: Alteration to door - Hirst Engineering.
- c. 1979: Mezzanine built above skating rink.
- 1982: Opening created between two easternmost shops.
- 1994: Fire order placed on building.

== Heritage listing ==
The Trocadero is a rare example of a purpose-built roller skating rink of the late 1880s. At the time it was built it was also reputed to be the largest and most elegant rink in Australia. The wrought iron roof trusses over the rink are very fine, elegant and early examples, typical of railway buildings of the time, and represent the development of iron and steel technology in the late 19th century. The operable roof over the clerestory is also of technological significance and extremely rare in Australia, possibly unique. The building is a rare Sydney example of a Victorian Flemish style commercial building with free style Gothic detailing.

Trocadero was listed on the New South Wales State Heritage Register on 10 March 2000 having satisfied the following criteria.

The place is important in demonstrating the course, or pattern, of cultural or natural history in New South Wales.

The Trocadero is a rare example of a purpose-built roller skating rink of the late 1880s At the time it was built it was also reputed to be the largest and most elegant rink in Australia. The retention of the 1857-60 terraces within the structure of the Trocadero building, the building of the elaborate King Street facade and Hall in the boom time of the mid-1880s in response to the fad for indoor roller skating, the demise of that use in the 1893 depression years and the subsequent variety of uses such as Propert's Motorcar works, etc. are a significant record of the history of King Street, Newtown and the fluctuations in economic fortunes of the state from 1857 up to and including the current fire order on the building.

The place is important in demonstrating aesthetic characteristics and/or a high degree of creative or technical achievement in New South Wales.

The Trocadero is a rare example of a Victorian Flemish style commercial building with free style Gothic detailing. The building contributes greatly to the nineteenth century streetscape of King Street, newtown, being one of the most elaborate facades in the street. The bulk and industrial/warehouse nature of the Campbell Street facade dominates that streetscape. The interior retains several significant spaces: the skating rink hall, the billiards saloon, the second floor club room and tower (demolished), and the vestibule.

The place has a strong or special association with a particular community or cultural group in New South Wales for social, cultural or spiritual reasons.

The building contains the remnants of terrace housing, a hall associated with the social and recreational life of the local community of Newtown and the wider Sydney community for over twenty years, shops and meeting spaces used by a wide section of the community variously for social functions, refuge, residence and factories and is associated with the development of the motor car industry in NSW through Propert's use and ownership of the building. The building is a significant record of the response and adaption of community and commercial sectors to the fluctuation of the economy of NSW from 1889 to 1998.

The place has potential to yield information that will contribute to an understanding of the cultural or natural history of New South Wales.

The skating rink features a very light weight roof supported by fine wrought iron trusses spanning 60 feet (18 m) across the building. Iron straps bolted through brick piers transfer the load to the ground. The internal balcony is supported off the same straps and piers. The roof and its structure is fully visible from floor level. The design of the wrought iron trusses is early and similar to railway construction although the roof and structure as a whole is unusual. The smaller clerestorey roof runs almost the length of the hall and could be opened by turning a crank to allow the two sides to slide back over the main roof structure. The mechanism is still substantially intact. It may be that this type of mechanism, once common in European theatres and very rare in Australia is unique and therefore highly significant. It is reputed that the whole of the building was lit by electricity when opened in 1889. As no general supply was available this must have been by generator on an adjacent site. This has not been confirmed by physical evidence of wiring . Gas lighting was introduced in 1903.

The place possesses uncommon, rare or endangered aspects of the cultural or natural history of New South Wales.

The building is a rare Sydney example of a Victorian Flemish style commercial building with free style Gothic detailing. The operable roof over the clerestory is extremely rare in Australia, possibly unique. The building is probably the last remaining purpose built skating rink of the late 1880s.

The place is important in demonstrating the principal characteristics of a class of cultural or natural places/environments in New South Wales.

It is representative of, and reputed to be, the largest and most elegant purpose built rink in Australia of the mid to late 1880s. The fine wrought iron trusses and brackets are representative of the iron and steel technology of the late 19th century.
