= The Private World of Miss Prim =

- Genre: Sitcom
- Starring: Dawn Lake
- Country of origin: Australia
- Original language: English
- No. of seasons: 1
- No. of episodes: 11 (plus 2 unaired)

Production
- Executive producer: Bill Harmon
- Running time: 30 minutes
- Production company: NLT Productions

Original release
- Network: Nine Network
- Release: 3 June – 12 August 1966

The Private World of Miss Prim is an Australian television sitcom which first screened on the Nine Network in 1966. The series followed the adventures of secretary, Miss Prim, working in the world of the children's court, who was often given to flights of fancy. It was produced by NLT Productions.

== Production ==
The Private World of Miss Prim was supposed to run for 13 episodes but ended after 11 episodes.

The series is on the National Film and Sound Archive's 'most wanted' list, as only the pilot episode is known to have survived.

== Cast ==
- Dawn Lake as Miss Prim
- Owen Weingott as Tony Kendall
- Benita Collings as The Typist
- Tony Bazell as Mr. Hardy
- Marion Johns as Mrs. Hardy
- Moray Powell as Managing Director Pringle

== Production ==
"It just didn't work out," said Bruce Gyngell, managing director of TCN-9. "On paper it seemed to be an exciting concept... We tried to be too believable in the dream sequences... There was no pathos in it."

== Episode list ==
No.	Title	Original release date	Melbourne air date
1	Unknown	3 June 1966	7 June 1966
2	"The Tyrant"	10 June 1966	Unknown
3	"The Great Escape"	17 June 1966	Unknown
4	"The Slave Girl"	Unknown	Unknown
5	"The Spendthrift"	1 July 1966	Unknown
6	"The Great Composer"	8 July 1966	12 July 1966
7	"The First Queen Liz"	15 July 1966	Unknown
8	"The White Haired Lady"	22 July 1966	Unknown
9	"The Spy"	29 July 1966	Unknown
10	"The Little Horror"	5 August 1966	Unknown
11	"The Movie Star"	12 August 1966	Unknown

== See also ==
- List of Australian television series
