= The Rovers (TV series) =

- Created by: Roger Mirams
- Starring: Rowena Wallace; Edward Hepple; Noel Trevarthen; Grant Seiden
- Theme music composer: Tommy Leonetti music Barry Crocker; Peter Flanagan Lyrics
- Country of origin: Australia
- No. of seasons: 2
- No. of episodes: 39

Production
- Executive producer: Bill Harmon
- Producer: Don Cash
- Running time: 30 minutes per episode

Original release
- Network: The 0-10 Network
- Release: 21 August 1969 – 12 June 1970

The Rovers is an Australian ocean-based family adventure television show originally screened from 21 August 1969 until 12 June 1970 and was broadcast on the 0-Ten network, the precursor of Network Ten

== Synopsis ==
Produced by NLT Productions, executive producer was Bill Harmon and producer Don Cash, who would later create Number 96. The series was created by Roger Mirams and starred Rowena Wallace, Edward Hepple, Noel Trevarthen and child actor Grant Seiden.

The storylines revolve around the adventures of the crew of the Pacific Lady, an island schooner owned by Captain Sam McGill (or "Cap" for short), played by Hepple, Bob Wild (a freelance photographer) played by Trevarthen and Rusty Collins (a wildlife journalist), played by Wallace.

Thirty-nine episodes of 30 minutes each were produced on colour film, with an eye to distributing in overseas markets the way Skippy the Bush Kangaroo was. Writers included Kenneth Cook, Michael Latimer, Ron McLean, Michael Wright, Ralph Peterson and Rosamund Waring.

Ron Randell, who was in Australia performing in stage plays at the time, guest-starred in some episodes.

The music for the show's theme song was composed by Italian-American musician Tommy Leonetti, whose actress-stepdaughter Kimberly Beck would later co-star on the similar series Westwind.

== Cast ==
=== Main ===
- Rowena Wallace as Rusty Collins
- Edward Hepple as Captain Sam McGill
- Noel Trevarthen as Bob Wild
- Grant Seiden

=== Guests ===
- Ben Gabriel as Horace Soames (1 episode)
- Benita Collings as Margaret Walsh
- Brian Moll as Dr Wright
- Dawn Lake as Dawn Tobin / Mrs. Drury
- Don Crosby as Mr Newton (2 episodes)
- Jack Thompson as Kenneth Baker / Bill (2 episodes)
- Jeanie Drynan as Ann Fraser (1 episode)
- John Meillon as Bruce Hunter (1 episode)
- Kat Loader as Constanow / Tony / Fisherman
- Kate Fitzpatrick as Connie (1 episode)
- Kerry McGuire as Dorrie (1 episode)
- Les Foxcroft as Neighbour / Smayell (2 episodes)
- Lex Marinos as Roberto Servijano (1 episode)
- Lionel Long as Police Sergeant (1 episode)
- Lorraine Bayly as Virginia Shaw (1 episode)
- Mark McManus as Jack Webster (1 episode)
- Peter Whitford as Rogers (1 episode)
- Reg Gorman as Policeman (1 episode)
- Richard Meikle as Professor Anderson (1 episode)
- Ron Randell
- Serge Lazareff as Constable/ Tony / Fisherman (4 episodes)
- Slim De Grey as Terry Claffey
- Stewart Ginn as Ocker / Harris (2 episodes)
- Tony Hughes
- Vincent Gil as Biker / Bert

== Production ==
A number of episodes were written by Ron McLean and Michael Wright.
