= Ajax Films =

Australian production company and studio

Ajax Films was an Australian production company and studio that operated in the 1960s and 1970s. It was crucial to the revival of the Australian film and TV industry in the 1970s because it was involved in many of the early feature films from that era, either as a production partner or provider of facilities. Ajax also produced a large number of documentaries, cartoons and advertisements.

It was established by Brian Chirlian, primarily to make TV commercials for the British Tobacco Company in a studio at Argyle Street in Sydney. They eventually expanded to another location at the old Warringah Hall at Neutral Bay, with a second studio at Bondi Junction. This studio had previously been used by Cinesound Productions and Southern International Productions and was where Ajax became involved with feature films, providing facilities for They're a Weird Mob (1966), among others. TV commercials and documentaries would be shot at the Neutral Bay studio. Among the personnel who worked there were Jack Lee (film director), Tony Buckley (editor) and Bryce Courtney (ad agency creative director who did much work at Ajax).

== Selected filmography ==
- Alpine Way (1962) – documentary
- They're a Weird Mob (1966)
- Age of Consent (1969) – feature film
- Color Me Dead (1969) – feature film
- Eddie's Alphabet (1968–70) – animated TV series
- Woobinda: Animal Doctor (1969) – TV series
- Squeeze a Flower (1969) – feature film
- Adam's Woman (1970) – feature film
- Ned Kelly (1970) – feature film
- Wake in Fright (1971) – feature film
