= Maggie Fitzgibbon =

Australian actress and singer (1929–2020)

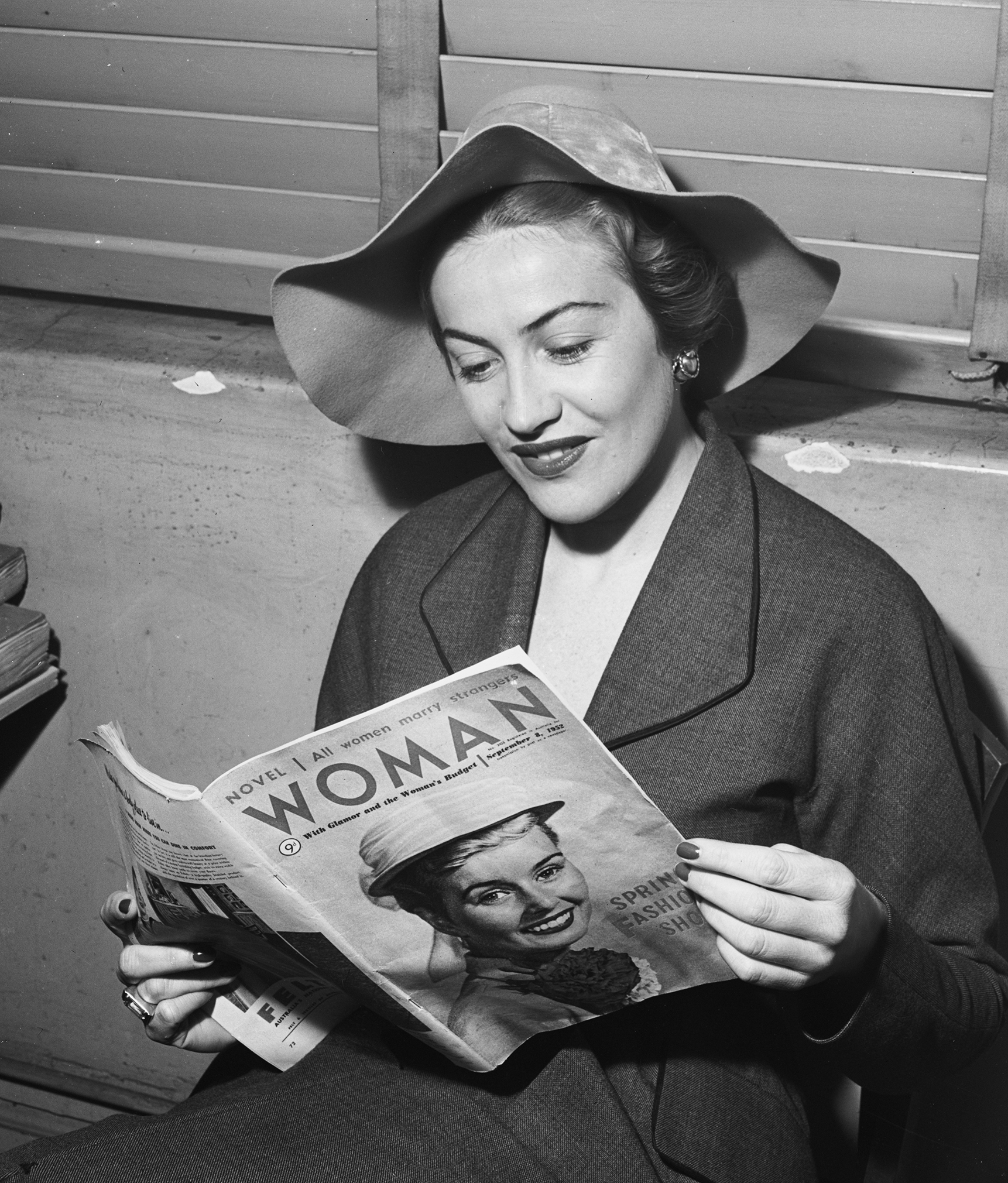
- Maggie Fitzgibbon, 1952
- Born: Margaret Helen Fitzgibbon; 30 January 1929; Melbourne, Australia
- Died: 8 June 2020 (aged 91); Australia
- Occupation: Actor
- Years active: 1946 - 2002
- Spouse: Sidney de Kat

Margaret Helen Fitzgibbon (OAM) (30 January 1929 – 8 June 2020) was an Australian actress and singer, best known for her career in Britain. Coming from a show-business family, she was the older sister of musician Smacka Fitzgibbon. She was best known for her small-screen roles in BBC serial The Newcomers and LWT's Manhunt, though she appeared in numerous West End theatre musicals and light dramas showcasing her singing talents.

== Early life and career ==
Fitzgibbon was born in Melbourne, to Minnie Mitchell, a music hall singer and tap dancer and Graham Fitzgibbon an acrobat and tap dancer, who also worked as a bookies clerk. She began her career as operatic soprano with the Tivoli Circuit in 1946 before graduating to radio 2GB with Jack Davey. Around 1950 she started developing as a solo cabaret performer in Sydney's main night clubs and during this period she changed her performing name to Maggie Fitzgibbin, spotted by Sir Frank Tait of J. C. Williamson's, he offered her the featured role of Bianca in the 1952 Australian production of Kiss Me Kate, in which she appeared with Hayes Gordon.

Maggie then left for the United Kingdom and was soon cast as principal boy in the pantomime Aladdin at Blackpool, opposite Hylda Baker who played Widow Twankey. Then came a twelve months tour with Flanagan and Allen in The Crazy Gang. Her own cabaret act followed at The Astor, The Stork Room, The Pigalle Club and, in 1956, Winston's Club with Danny La Rue. More cabarets, stage musicals and plays came along (including playing the role of Jane in a 1960 London revival of Rudolf Friml's Rose-Marie, for which she recreated the role in a studio cast recording the following year) until, in 1961 she appeared opposite Max Bygraves in the musical Do Re Mi.

== TV and film and theatre ==
Fitzgibbon appeared on various British television dramas such as Danger Man. The BBC cast her in the starring role of Vivienne Cooper in their TV series The Newcomers which ran from 1965 to 1969. This led to her own show for London Weekend Television Maggie's Place and with guest appearances such as Benny Hill and Morecambe and Wise. She also played a leading role as Adelaide in LWT's 1970 26-part wartime drama Manhunt, and appeared in the 1972 film Sunstruck opposite Harry Secombe.

She returned to Australia briefly in 1963 to star in Noël Coward's Australian production of his musical Sail Away, then returning to London to star with Bob Monkhouse and Ronnie Corbett in the Drury Lane production of The Boys from Syracuse (Luce). Her final West End appearance was in Side By Side By Sondheim after which she retired to farm in Australia, making only occasional guest appearances, mainly on the concert stage.

== Awards ==
In 2002 she was awarded an OAM for services to the community. Fitzgibbon was featured in the Victorian Jazz Archive exhibition entitled The Fitzgibbon Dynasty. Fitzgibbon died in June 2020 at the age of 91.
