= Here's Dawn =

Television series

- Genre: Variety
- Starring: Dawn Lake
- Country of origin: Australia
- Original language: English

Production
- Running time: 30 minutes

Original release
- Network: Nine Network
- Release: 1964 – 1965

Here's Dawn is an Australian television series which aired 1964 to 1965 on the Nine Network. A half-hour variety series with emphasis on comedy sketches, it was produced in Sydney and starred Dawn Lake. While popular with viewers, it was not well received by critics. Nevertheless, along with The Mavis Bramston Show and Barley Charlie, it represented an increasing interest by Australian TV stations towards locally produced comedy programming, which had previously been largely neglected.

== See also ==
- Take That - First Australian sitcom (1957–1959)
- The Passionate Pianist - 1957 TV comedy short
