= Bandwagon (Australian TV series) =

- Genre: Variety
- Presented by: Joy Youlden
- Country of origin: Australia
- Original language: English

Original release
- Network: HSV-7
- Release: 1959 – 1960

Bandwagon is an Australian television variety series, which aired on Melbourne station HSV-7 from 1959 to 1960.

Produced by Joy Youlden, the series aired live on Tuesdays at 9:30PM.

Performers on the series included Michael Cole, Graeme Bent, Heather Horwood, Joy Grisold, Diana Bell, Judy Banks and Judd Laine.

The 3 September 1959 edition of The Age compared the series unfavourably to its main competition, the popular In Melbourne Tonight on GTV-9. The writer for the newspaper felt that although the cast of Bandwagon were "quite adaptable to the TV medium", they were let down by the scripts and music choices.
