= Hamish & Andy =

Australian comedy duo

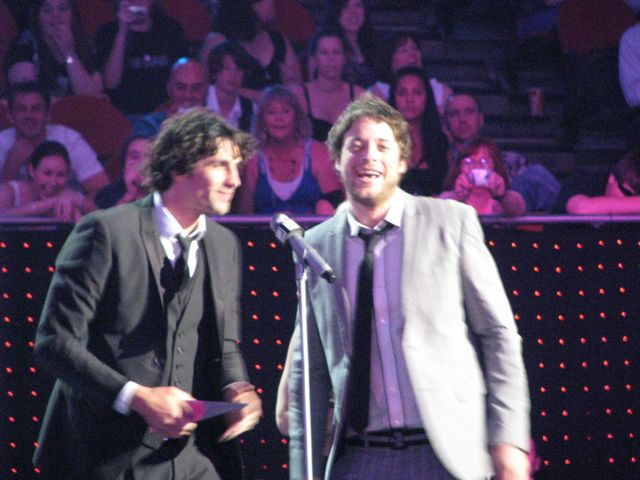
- Andy Lee (left) and Hamish Blake at the 2009 ARIA Music Awards
- Notable work: Hamish & Andy (radio show); Hamish & Andy (podcast); Caravan of Courage; Gap Year; True Story; Cool Boys and the Frontman

Comedy career
- Years active: 2002–present
- Medium: Television, radio, podcasting
- Website: hamishandandy.com

Hamish & Andy are an Australian comedy duo formed in 2003 by Hamish Blake and Andy Lee after becoming friends at the University of Melbourne. Best known for their radio shows, which were broadcast nationally for over a decade and included the highest-rated drive time show in Australian history, the duo have also hosted several television series, including Gap Year, Caravan of Courage and True Story.

Blake and Lee started radio presenting at student network SYN before becoming comedy writers. Their first shows on Fox FM found success and were syndicated nationally in the mid-2000s. From 2006 they hosted their self-titled weekday show, broadcast on the Hit Network in all seven major cities, which became the highest rated radio show in Australian history, attracting around two million regular listeners. After changes to their show's format through the mid-2010s with the shorter Business Brunch and Happy Hour programmes, they returned to drive time from 2015, and retired from radio at the end of 2017. The duo started to produce a weekly self-titled podcast from 2018, and have since presented spin-off programmes including the Remembering Project, where they reminisce on their old radio work.

In television, Blake and Lee gained popularity as correspondents on Rove, and for their various seasons of Hamish & Andy's Gap Year which won multiple Logie Awards including Most Popular Light Entertainment Program in 2012, 2014 and 2015. They have also made numerous appearances hosting events, competing on game shows and in celebrity sporting events. From 2016, they also performed in a touring rock cover band, Cool Boys and the Frontman, which featured several notable guest vocalists.

== Background ==
Hamish Blake and Andy Lee met while both studying at the University of Melbourne in 2001. They entered comedy competitions together and just a year after meeting, they started their career in radio by hosting a show on community radio station SYN.

== Radio career ==
=== First radio shows ===
Blake and Lee began presenting radio on Melbourne community station SYN, initially hosting Cruise Control in the Monday afternoon timeslot during the station's test broadcasts in June 2002. They later co-hosted the station's Friday afternoon drivetime show The Buzz in 2003. Soon after, Blake began writing for Fox FM breakfast programme The Matt and Jo Show, and the pair started to host a Monday late-night show called Almost Tuesday on the same network. It was then moved to Saturday mornings at 10 am, with a name change to Almost Midday.

=== Drive time show ===
The duo hosted a two-hour weekday drive time radio show, The Hamish & Andy Show, from 2006 on the Hit Network (then known as the Today FM Network). In less than six months, Southern Cross Austereo decided to broadcast the show Australia-wide, becoming one of the country's first national drive shows.

The show became the highest-rated series in Australian history, with approximately two million listeners daily. During its broadcast, the show had completed two domestic and two foreign caravan tours, a Bass Strait sailboat trip, and trips to Afghanistan, Beijing, Japan, India, and the United States, recording live on location.

The show was syndicated internationally, with a highlights package broadcast on BBC Radio 6 in December 2009. In 2010, they also presented three shows in London to cover Christian O'Connell on his breakfast show. In 2010, Blake and Lee signed a deal to present a series of shows for British network Absolute Radio on Sunday evenings.

The duo have released two compilation albums of segments from their self-titled show, Unessential Listening (2008) and Celebrating 50 Glorious Years (2010). Both albums won ARIA Awards for Best Comedy Release. The programme won 14 Australian Commercial Radio Awards.

Blake and Lee announced in August 2010 that they would be cutting down their show to a single programme each week from 2011 onward, in the Friday afternoon drive time slot. The final daily programme aired on 3 December 2010.

=== Business Brunch and Happy Hour ===
Hamish and Andy returned to daily radio in early 2013 with a new show titled Business Brunch, airing from 9 am to 10 am Tuesdays to Fridays (except in Sydney, where it would air from 10 am to 11 am, following The Kyle and Jackie O Show). This complemented their regular drive time show which had moved to just be on Mondays. Rather than having recurring segments each day, Business Brunch aimed to cover one topic per show. Listeners were invited to contribute their expertise on a wide range of topics via their website, rather than through the traditional radio phone-in method. The late Nine Network news personality Peter Harvey provided the voice of the introduction, even after his death (as it was the wish of him and his family).

The pair announced in a June 2013 show that they had been "promoted" to the early drive slot of 3 pm to 4 pm weekdays. The show was renamed Happy Hour and continued the aim of discussing one topic per show. The move to this slot signaled a hiatus from their weekly 4 pm to 6 pm drive show. They briefly returned to the drive slot for two weeks in July 2014 to fill in for current drive hosts Dan & Maz during radio survey break.

=== Return to drive time ===
In October 2014, it was announced the duo would return to their weekly drive time slot on the Hit Network from 6 July 2015. In 2016, the duo announced that 2017 would be their final year on radio, and that they would be retiring to focus on their television careers once more. Their show's final episodes that year received an estimated 30 million podcast downloads.

== Podcasting career ==
After they retired from radio, Blake and Lee announced their programme will continue in a weekly podcast-only format from 2018. As of July 2026, there have been more 340 episodes across nine seasons. In 2020, they also began a spin-off podcast called the Remembering Project, where they revisit a random segment from their back catalogue of over 2,500 radio episodes.

== List of radio shows and podcasts ==
List of radio and podcast shows hosted by Hamish & Andy with years broadcast, duration and station
Programme	Format	Year	Release	Duration	Network	Ref.
Cruise Control	radio	June 2002	Monday 1–2pm	1 hour	SYN	
The Almost Tuesday Show	radio	2003	Monday 10pm–12am	2 hours	Fox FM	
The Almost Midday Show	radio	2004–2005	Saturday 10am–12pm	2 hours	Fox FM (2004); Hit Network (Note: Formerly known as the Today Network) (2005)	
The Hamish & Andy Show	radio	2006–2010	Weekdays 4–6pm	2 hours	Fox FM (from January 2006); Hit Network (from July 2006)	
The Hamish & Andy Show	radio	March 2011–November 2012	Friday 4–6pm	2 hours	Hit Network	
Board Meeting	podcast	March 2011–November 2012	Wednesday	30 mins	—N/a	
Hamish & Andy	radio	February–July 2013	Monday 4–6pm	2 hours	Hit Network	
Hamish & Andy's Business Brunch	radio (Note: Pre-recorded program which was syndicated nationally at different time slots)	February–July 2013	Tuesday–Friday 9–10am (Note: 10–11am on 2Day FM and Sea FM 90.9)	1 hour	Hit Network	
Hamish & Andy's Happy Hour	radio	July 2013–November 2014	Weekdays 3–4pm	1 hour	Hit Network	
Hamish & Andy	radio	July 2015–December 2017	Weekdays 4–6pm	2 hours	Hit Network	
Hamish & Andy	podcast	February 2018–present	Thursday	45 mins	Hit Network (Note: In summer, the podcast has occasionally been syndicated from 4–6pm, including music and advertisements not in the original programme)	
Hamish & Andy's Remembering Project	podcast	October 2020–present	Wednesday (Note: Typically not a year-round podcast)	20 mins	—N/a	
Quizmas Time	podcast	Summer 2025–2026	Thursday (Note: Typically only released in the off-season of the flagship Hamish & Andy podcast)	40 mins	—N/a	

== Television career ==
=== Early days ===
Blake united with Lee in 2003 when they developed a Channel 31 sketch show, called Radio Karate, with friends Ryan Shelton and Tim Bartley. Blake reunited with Lee in 2004 when they were named hosts of a new Seven Network variety programme, Hamish and Andy, a show described as a successor to Big Bite. It premiered in 2004, and steadily built a moderate cult audience. However the show did not rate well and was cancelled after its initial run of six episodes. The 2004 series was then given a repeat run on 7HD in 2007, and many clips survive from these reruns.

In 2020, it was revealed that the tapes for Hamish and Andy had been taped over by the Seven Network by Commonwealth Games broadcasts when asked if they still had them.

=== Rove and guest appearances ===
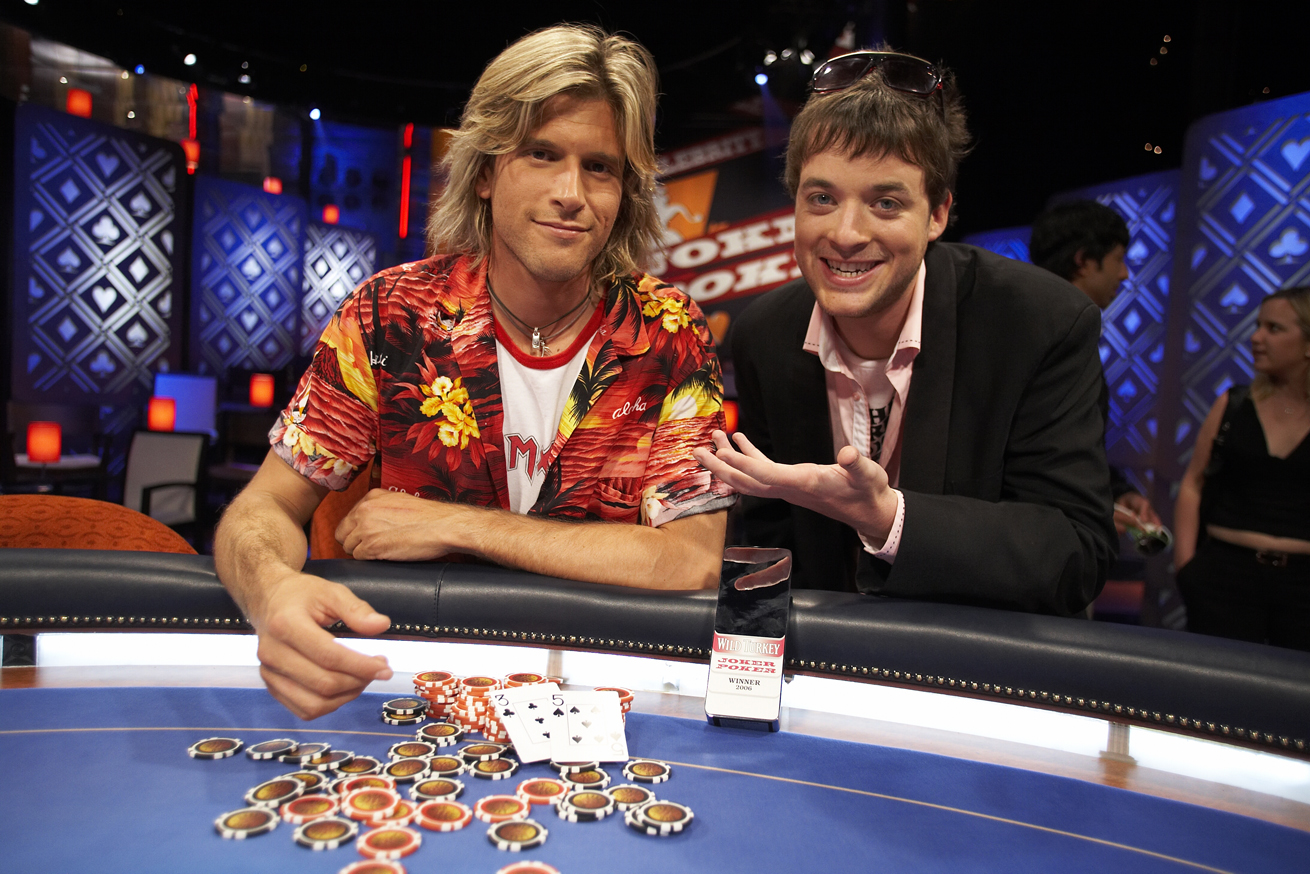
Hamish Blake with Osher Günsberg appearing on Joker Poker in 2005

In 2005, they were recruited by comedian Rove McManus to develop a satirical television comedy series, Real Stories, which aired on Network 10 in 2006. From 2007 to 2009, the duo appeared fortnightly on Rove in a mixture of pre-recorded segments and live appearances. They hosted the Logie Awards in 2007 and 2008 (and went on to open the 2013 and 2014 ceremonies), and the ARIA Music Awards in 2008. They appeared on Joker Poker and Australia's Brainiest Comedian in 2005, Are You Smarter Than A 5th Grader? in 2009, and Good News Week in 2010. The group appeared on The Jay Leno Show twice in 2009, and on The Project numerous times from 2009, in a similar manner as they did on Rove. They appeared on the UK's The Graham Norton Show in June 2010.

=== Network 10 specials ===
The duo have presented numerous televised clip show specials on Network 10. Hamish and Andy: Re-Gifted at the end of 2008, and Hamish & Andy: Re-Gifted – Another Very Early Christmas Special at the end of 2009, were both produced in conjunction with Roving Enterprises and consisted mostly of highlights of their fortnightly appearances on Rove. Their 2010 Hamish & Andy's Reministmas Special served as a continuation of both and recapped many of their adventures during the year, mostly as part of their radio show.

In addition to these, they produced three travel specials for 10. Hamish & Andy's American Caravan of Courage in 2009 (another Roving Enterprises co-production) summarised their two-week road-trip across the United States. Similarly, 2010's Hamish & Andy's Caravan of Courage: Great Britain and Ireland recapped their next caravan trip made as part of their radio show. Their third travel special, Learn India with Hamish & Andy, aired as part of the network's lead-up to the 2010 Commonwealth Games in Delhi.

=== Nine Network and Gap Year ===
Following a series of media reports, the pair confirmed in February 2011 that they had joined the Nine Network on a two-year contract, to produce Hamish and Andy's Gap Year. The show first aired on 28 July 2011. The show premiered to strong ratings and has since gone on to three more seasons (Hamish & Andy's Euro Gap Year in 2012 and Hamish & Andy's Gap Year Asia in 2013 and Hamish & Andy's Gap Year South America in 2014).

The pair also filmed a fifth Caravan of Courage adventure in 2012, in which they compared their home country, Australia, to their neighbours New Zealand in two 75-minute specials.

In December 2016, the duo announced that 2017 would be their last year on radio, in order to focus on television. They also announced an as yet unnamed TV show to be aired on the Nine Network in mid-2017. The duo advertised on their website and radio show, for listeners to contribute "great stories" for "The Great Stories Project" which was the basis of their 2017 television show True Story with Hamish & Andy on the Nine Network. The series was a success, and it was renewed for a second season in 2018.

The duo starred in the three-part series Hamish and Andy's "Perfect" Holiday in 2019, which documented their holiday across the United States and Canada.

Hamish & Andy have presented a number of television series and specials since 2003. They began on sketch shows but have found greater success in recent years with their travel diary-style programmes.

== List of television shows ==
List of television shows hosted by Hamish & Andy with networks, timeslots, viewership and other details
Year	Programme	Network	No. of episodes	Episode duration	Timeslot	Original release	Viewers (Aus metro capitals)
2003	Radio Karate	Channel 31	6	30 mins	—N/a	—N/a	—N/a
2004	Hamish & Andy	Seven Network	6	60 mins	Wednesday 9:30pm	31 March–5 May 2004	—N/a
2006	Real Stories	Network 10	8	30 mins	Tuesday 9pm	22 August–10 October 2006	788,000 (season average)
2008	Hamish & Andy: Re-Gifted	Network 10	Special	60 mins	Wednesday 7:30pm	19 November 2008	1,136,000
2009	Hamish & Andy's American Caravan of Courage	Network 10	Special	60 mins	Thursday 7:30pm	10 September 2009	1,307,000
2009	Hamish & Andy: Re-Gifted – Another Very Early Christmas Special	Network 10	Special	60 mins	Monday 7:30pm	23 November 2009	1,052,000
2010	Hamish & Andy's Caravan of Courage: Great Britain & Ireland	Network 10	Special	60 mins	Thursday 8:30pm	17 June 2010	1,749,000
2010	Learn India with Hamish & Andy	Network 10	Special	60 mins	Sunday 7:30pm	3 October 2010	1,231,000
2010	Hamish & Andy's Reministmas Special	Network 10	Special	60 mins	Sunday 7:30pm	21 November 2010	1,183,000
2011	Hamish & Andy's Gap Year	Nine Network	10	60 mins	Thursday 8:30pm	28 July–29 September 2011	961,000 (season average)
2012	Hamish & Andy's Euro Gap Year	Nine Network	7	60 mins	Thursday 8pm	14 June–26 July 2012	1,248,000 (season average)
2012	Hamish & Andy's Caravan of Courage: Australia vs New Zealand	Nine Network	2	90 mins	Sunday 6:30pm	11–18 November 2012	1,338,000; 1,219,000
2013	Hamish & Andy's Gap Year Asia	Nine Network	6	60 mins	Monday 8pm	8 July–19 August 2013	1,372,000 (season average)
2014	Hamish & Andy's Gap Year South America	Nine Network	6	60 mins	Tuesday 7:30pm	1 July–5 August 2014	1,000,000 (season average)
2017	True Story with Hamish & Andy (season 1)	Nine Network	10	30 mins	Monday 7:30pm	5 June–29 August 2017	1,047,000 (season average)
2018	True Story with Hamish & Andy (season 2)	Nine Network	10	30 mins	Tuesday 8:40pm	7 August–9 October 2018	725,000 (season average)
2019	Hamish and Andy's "Perfect" Holiday	Nine Network	3	60 mins	Sunday 7pm	17 November–1 December 2019	1,457,000

== Discography ==
List of albums, with selected chart positions and certifications
Title	Details	Peak chart positions	Certifications
Title	Details	AUS	Certifications
Unessential Listening	Released: November 2008; Label: Roadshow Music (301441-2); Formats: CD, digital download	4	ARIA: Platinum
Celebrating 50 Glorious Years	Released: November 2010; Label: Roadshow Music (301597-2); Formats: 2xCD, digital download	6	ARIA: Gold

== Other projects ==
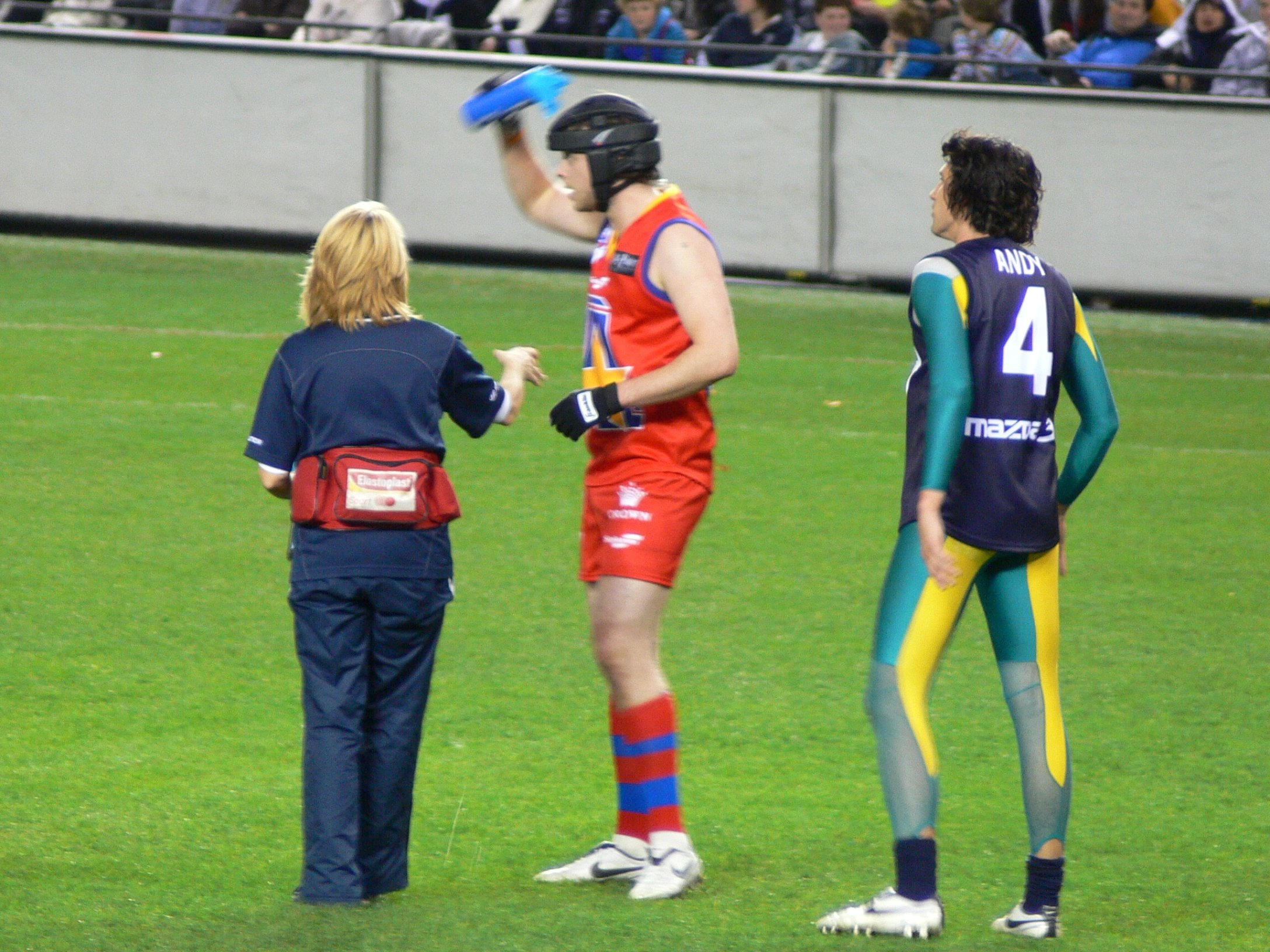
Blake (centre) and Lee (right) played in the 2008 E. J. Whitten Legends Game.

On 7 July 2007, they presented the Australian leg of Live Earth and appeared at the Melbourne Sound Relief concert in 2009. They played in the 2008 and 2009 E. J. Whitten Legends Game. They made a mockumentary short film, The Greystone 2800, that won the 2005 Melbourne Comedy Festival Short Film competition. They also hosted FHM's Search for Australia's Funniest Man.

They had minor acting roles on the soap opera Neighbours, portraying radio presenters Fred and Big Tommo on the episode dated 27 August 2008. The episode featured them promoting university drop-out Ty Harper's (Dean Geyer) band, and interviewing schoolgirls Rachel Kinski (Caitlin Stasey) and Donna Freedman (Margot Robbie) about their situation with Harper. They make a cameo appearance in the 2010 short film IA: Interview Artist.

They have also made appearances on many Austereo radio shows, occasionally filling in for Kyle & Jackie O, Matt & Jo, or Fifi and Jules when a regular presenter fell ill.

Hamish and Andy hosted "the richest horse suit race in Australia" in the small Victorian country town of Wedderburn, Victoria. It drew about 7,000 people and featured performances by themselves, Jessica Mauboy, and Birds of Tokyo.

In 2024, the duo appeared in television advertisements for Hubbl, Foxtel's digital media player device.

== Awards and nominations ==
=== ARIA Music Awards ===
The ARIA Music Awards are a set of annual ceremonies presented by Australian Recording Industry Association (ARIA), which recognise excellence, innovation, and achievement across all genres of the music of Australia. They commenced in 1987.

Year	Nominee / work	Award	Result	Ref.
2009	Unessential Listening	Best Comedy Release	Won	
2011	Celebrating 50 Glorious Years	Best Comedy Release	Won	
