= Logie Award for Most Popular Presenter =

Australian television award

- Country: Australia
- Presented by: TV Week
- First award: 2003
- Currently held by: Robert Irwin (2026)

Highlights
- Most awards: Rove McManus (7)
- Website: tvweeklogies.com.au

The Silver Logie for Most Popular Presenter is an award presented annually at the Australian TV Week Logie Awards. The award recognises the popularity of a presenter, co-host or judge of an Australian program.

It was first awarded at the 45th Annual TV Week Logie Awards, held in 2003 when the award was originally called Most Popular Presenter. It was briefly renamed Best Presenter (2016–2017). From 2018, the award category name was reverted to Most Popular Presenter; in 2022, its name was changed to Bert Newton Award for Most Popular Presenter in honour of the late Bert Newton, who was a 19-time Logie Awards host, Logie Hall of Fame inductee and four-time Gold Logie winner.

The winner and nominees of Most Popular Presenter are chosen by the public through an online voting survey on the TV Week website. Rove McManus holds the record for the most wins, with seven.

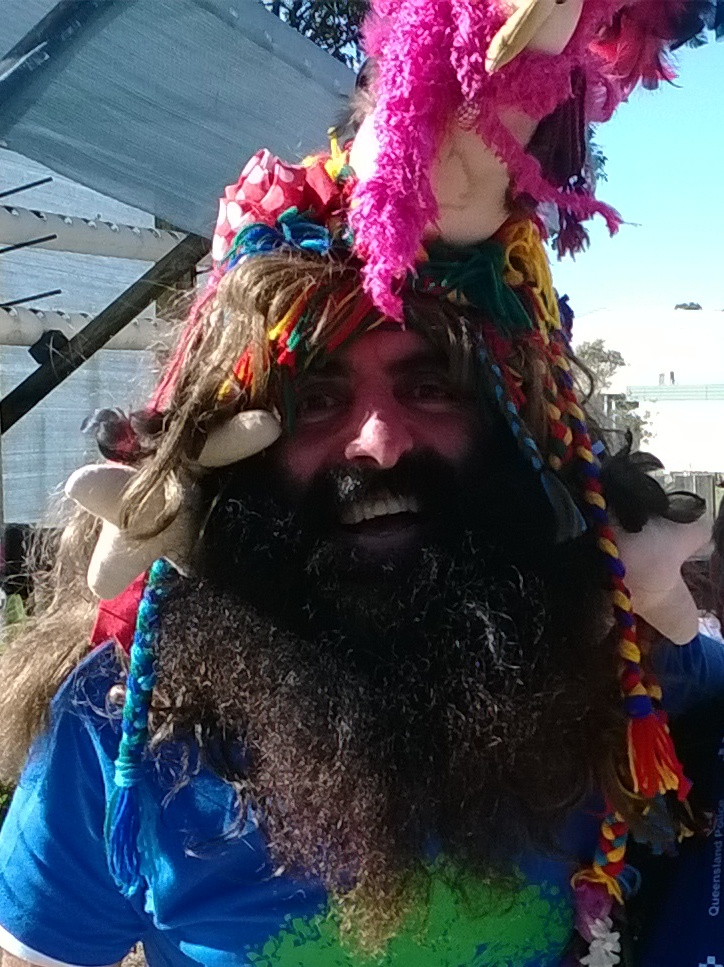
2019 Winner Costa Georgiadis

== Winners and nominees ==
Key	Meaning
‡	Indicates the winner

Table of winners and nominees
Year	Nominees	Program(s)	Network(s)	Ref.
2003	Rove McManus‡	Rove (Live)	Network Ten	
2003	Harry Cooper	Harry's Practice	Seven Network	
2003	Ernie Dingo	The Great Outdoors	Seven Network	
2003	Jamie Durie	Backyard Blitz	Nine Network	
2003	Eddie McGuire	Who Wants to Be a Millionaire?	Nine Network	
2004	Rove McManus‡	Rove (Live)	Network Ten	
2004	Ernie Dingo	The Great Outdoors	Seven Network	
2004	Jamie Durie	Backyard Blitz	Nine Network	
2004	Andrew G	Australian Idol	Network Ten	
2004	Andrew G	—N/a	Channel V	
2004	David Koch	Sunrise	Seven Network	
2005	Rove McManus‡	Rove (Live)	Network Ten	
2005	Andrew Denton	Enough Rope with Andrew Denton	ABC TV	
2005	Jamie Durie	Backyard Blitz	Nine Network	
2005	David Koch	Sunrise	Seven Network	
2005	Andrew O'Keefe	Deal or No Deal	Seven Network	
2006	Rove McManus‡	Rove Live	Network Ten	
2006	Melissa Doyle	Sunrise	Seven Network	
2006	David Koch	Sunrise	Seven Network	
2006	Andrew O'Keefe	Deal or No Deal	Seven Network	
2006	Tom Williams	The Great Outdoors	Seven Network	
2006	Tom Williams	The Mole	Seven Network	
2007	Rove McManus‡	Rove Live	Network Ten	
2007	Wil Anderson	The Glass House	ABC TV	
2007	Grant Denyer	It Takes Two	Seven Network	
2007	Melissa Doyle	Sunrise	Seven Network	
2007	David Koch	Sunrise	Seven Network	
2008	Rove McManus‡	Rove	Network Ten	
2008	Rove McManus‡	Are You Smarter than a 5th Grader?	Network Ten	
2008	Andrew Denton	Enough Rope	ABC1	
2008	Grant Denyer	It Takes Two	Seven Network	
2008	Melissa Doyle	Sunrise	Seven Network	
2008	Melissa Doyle	Where Are They Now?	Seven Network	
2008	Adam Hills	Spicks and Specks	ABC1	
2009	Rove McManus‡	Rove	Network Ten	
2009	Rove McManus‡	Are You Smarter Than a 5th Grader?	Network Ten	
2009	Natalie Bassingthwaighte	So You Think You Can Dance Australia	Network Ten	
2009	Andrew Denton	Enough Rope	ABC1	
2009	Grant Denyer	It Takes Two	Seven Network	
2009	Grant Denyer	Australia's Got Talent	Seven Network	
2009	Adam Hills	Spicks and Specks	ABC1	
2010	Shaun Micallef‡	Talkin' 'Bout Your Generation	Network Ten	
2010	Natalie Bassingthwaighte	So You Think You Can Dance Australia	Network Ten	
2010	Melissa Doyle	Sunrise	Seven Network	
2010	Melissa Doyle	The Zoo	Seven Network	
2010	Adam Hills	Spicks and Specks	ABC1	
2010	Rove McManus	Rove	Network Ten	
2010	Rove McManus	Are You Smarter Than a 5th Grader?	Network Ten	
2011	Karl Stefanovic‡	Today	Nine Network	
2011	Hamish Blake	Hamish & Andy Specials	Network Ten	
2011	Adam Hills	Spicks and Specks	ABC1	
2011	Shaun Micallef	Talkin' 'Bout Your Generation	Network Ten	
2011	Chrissie Swan	The Circle	Network Ten	
2012	Adam Hills‡	Spicks and Specks	ABC1	
2012	Adam Hills‡	Adam Hills in Gordon Street Tonight	ABC1	
2012	Carrie Bickmore	The Project	Network Ten	
2012	Hamish Blake	Hamish and Andy's Gap Year	Nine Network	
2012	Karl Stefanovic	Today	Nine Network	
2012	Chrissie Swan	The Circle	Network Ten	
2013	Hamish Blake‡	Hamish and Andy's Euro Gap Year	Nine Network	
2013	Hamish Blake‡	Hamish and Andy's Caravan of Courage: Australia vs New Zealand	Nine Network	
2013	Carrie Bickmore	The Project	Network Ten	
2013	Adam Hills	Adam Hills in Gordon Street Tonight	ABC1	
2013	Andy Lee	Hamish and Andy's Euro Gap Year	Nine Network	
2013	Andy Lee	Hamish and Andy's Caravan of Courage: Australia vs New Zealand	Nine Network	
2013	Chrissie Swan	Can of Worms	Network Ten	
2014	Scott Cam‡	The Block	Nine Network	
2014	Carrie Bickmore	The Project	Network Ten	
2014	Hamish Blake	Hamish & Andy's Gap Year Asia	Nine Network	
2014	Adam Hills	Adam Hills Tonight	ABC1	
2014	Andy Lee	Hamish & Andy's Gap Year Asia	Nine Network	
2015	Carrie Bickmore‡	The Project	Network Ten	
2015	Grant Denyer	Family Feud	Network Ten	
2015	Amanda Keller	The Living Room	Network Ten	
2015	Andy Lee	Hamish & Andy's Gap Year South America	Nine Network	
2015	Karl Stefanovic	Today	Nine Network	
2016	Waleed Aly‡	The Project	Network Ten	
2016	Carrie Bickmore	The Project	Network Ten	
2016	Lee Lin Chin	SBS World News	SBS	
2016	Lee Lin Chin	The Feed	SBS	
2016	Grant Denyer	Family Feud	Network Ten	
2016	Grant Denyer	The Great Australian Spelling Bee	Network Ten	
2016	Amanda Keller	The Living Room	Network Ten	
2017	Waleed Aly‡	The Project	Network Ten	
2017	Carrie Bickmore	The Project	Network Ten	
2017	Grant Denyer	All Star Family Feud	Network Ten	
2017	Grant Denyer	Family Feud	Network Ten	
2017	Grant Denyer	The Great Australian Spelling Bee	Network Ten	
2017	Sarah Harris	Studio 10	Network Ten	
2017	Sarah Harris	Shark Tank	Network Ten	
2017	Amanda Keller	The Living Room	Network Ten	
2018	Grant Denyer‡	All Star Family Feud	Network Ten	
2018	Grant Denyer‡	Family Feud	Network Ten	
2018	Carrie Bickmore	The Project	Network Ten	
2018	Tracy Grimshaw	A Current Affair	Nine Network	
2018	Amanda Keller	The Living Room	Network Ten	
2018	Andrew Winter	Selling Houses Australia	Foxtel (Lifestyle)	
2018	Andrew Winter	Love It or List It Australia	Foxtel (Lifestyle)	
2019	Costa Georgiadis‡	Gardening Australia	ABC	
2019	Amanda Keller	The Living Room	Network 10	
2019	Amanda Keller	Dancing with the Stars	Network 10	
2019	Carrie Bickmore	The Project	Network 10	
2019	Julia Morris	Blind Date	Network 10	
2019	Julia Morris	I'm a Celebrity...Get Me Out of Here!	Network 10	
2019	Julia Morris	Chris & Julia's Sunday Night Takeaway	Network 10	
2019	Tom Gleeson	Hard Quiz	ABC	
2019	Waleed Aly	The Project	Network 10	
2022	Hamish Blake‡	Lego Masters	Nine Network	
2022	Carrie Bickmore	The Project	Network 10	
2022	Leigh Sales	7.30	ABC	
2022	Melissa Leong	MasterChef Australia	Network 10	
2022	Melissa Leong	Celebrity MasterChef Australia	Network 10	
2022	Sonia Kruger	Big Brother	Seven Network	
2022	Sonia Kruger	Holey Moley	Seven Network	
2022	Sonia Kruger	Dancing with the Stars: All Stars	Seven Network	
2022	Sonia Kruger	The Voice	Seven Network	
2022	Sonia Kruger	The Voice Generations	Seven Network	
2022	Tom Gleeson	Hard Quiz	ABC	
2023	Tony Armstrong‡	A Dog's World with Tony Armstrong	ABC	
2023	Hamish Blake	Lego Masters	Nine Network	
2023	Julia Morris	I'm a Celebrity...Get Me Out of Here!	Network 10	
2023	Julia Morris	Taskmaster Australia	Network 10	
2023	Scott Cam	The Block	Nine Network	
2023	Shaun Micallef	Shaun Micallef's Mad as Hell	ABC	
2023	Sonia Kruger	Big Brother	Seven Network	
2023	Sonia Kruger	Dancing with the Stars	Seven Network	
2023	Sonia Kruger	The Voice	Seven Network	
2024	Larry Emdur‡	The Chase Australia	Seven Network	
2024	Larry Emdur‡	The Morning Show	Seven Network	
2024	Hamish Blake	Lego Masters	Nine Network	
2024	Julia Morris	I'm a Celebrity...Get Me Out of Here!	Network 10	
2024	Robert Irwin	I'm a Celebrity...Get Me Out of Here!	Network 10	
2024	Sonia Kruger	Big Brother	Seven Network	
2024	Sonia Kruger	Dancing with the Stars	Seven Network	
2024	Sonia Kruger	The Voice	Seven Network	
2024	Tony Armstrong	ABC News Breakfast	ABC	
2025	Todd Woodbridge‡	Tipping Point Australia	Nine Network	
2025	Todd Woodbridge‡	Australian Open	Nine Network	
2025	Todd Woodbridge‡	The Olympic Games Paris 2024	Nine Network	
2025	Todd Woodbridge‡	Paris 2024 Paralympic Games	Nine Network	
2025	Hamish Blake	Lego Masters Australia	Nine Network	
2025	Julia Morris	I'm A Celebrity… Get Me Out Of Here!	Network 10	
2025	Ricki-Lee Coulter	Australian Idol	Seven Network	
2025	Sonia Kruger	The Voice	Seven Network	
2025	Sonia Kruger	Dancing With The Stars	Seven Network	
2025	Sonia Kruger	Logies Red Carpet Show	Seven Network	
2025	Zan Rowe	Take 5 With Zan Rower	ABC	
2025	Zan Rowe	ABC New Year's Eve	ABC	
2026	Robert Irwin‡	I'm A Celebrity… Get Me Out Of Here!	Network 10	
2026	Amanda Keller	The Piano	ABC	
2026	Hamish Blake	Lego Masters Australia	Nine Network	
2026	Julia Morris	I'm A Celebrity… Get Me Out Of Here!	Network 10	
2026	Larry Emdur	The Chase	Seven Network	
2026	Lisa Millar	Back Roads	ABC	
2026	Lisa Millar	Muster Dogs	ABC	
2026	Lisa Millar	Muster Dogs: Where Are They Now	ABC	

== Multiple wins/nominations ==
Number	Presenter
Wins
7	Rove McManus
2	Hamish Blake
2	Waleed Aly
Nominations
8	Rove McManus
8	Carrie Bickmore
7	Adam Hills
7	Grant Denyer
5	Amanda Keller
4	David Koch
4	Melissa Doyle
4	Hamish Blake
3	Jamie Durie
3	Andrew Denton
3	Chrissie Swan
3	Karl Stefanovic
3	Andy Lee
3	Waleed Aly
3	Shaun Micallef
