= Hamish and Andy's "Perfect" Holiday =

- Presented by: Hamish Blake; Andy Lee
- Country of origin: Australia
- Original language: English
- No. of seasons: 1
- No. of episodes: 3

Production
- Running time: 60-70 minutes

Original release
- Network: Nine Network
- Release: 17 November – 1 December 2019

Hamish and Andy's “Perfect” Holiday is a comedy miniseries following Australian comedians Hamish Blake and Andy Lee, on their trips to various international locations in an attempt to find the "perfect holiday". The series premiered on 17 November 2019.

The series made its streaming debut on Stan in June 2022, alongside the duo's previous series True Story with Hamish & Andy.

== Format ==
Hamish and Andy will travel across United States, Alaska and Canada in 17 days to create their “Perfect Holiday”, however their activities on their adventure are decided by one for the other which will end in idiotic, extraordinary and dangerous results.

== Episodes ==
No.	Title	Original release date	Australian viewers
1	"Episode 1"	17 November 2019	987,000
Day 1 in Monroe, Washington: Hamish and Andy take part in a bus race on a figure eight track at the Evergreen Speedway with Andy as the driver and Hamish as the navigator, but before the race they made a bet with one of the drivers named Sam with whoever loses has to do a pole dance in Sam’s bus. Day 2 in Las Vegas, Nevada: Andy tells Hamish that he is going to be in a boxing match, but what he is actually doing is eating the hottest chili in the world, Pepper X. Day 3 in Dallas, Texas: Hamish has Andy pull a prank on Eric, a former high school football player who broke Andy’s nose in Hamish & Andy’s American Caravan of Courage (2009) by spicing his drink with Vegemite. Day 4 in Haines, Alaska: Andy takes Hamish to visit a man named Steve, at the Kroschel Films Wildlife Center to see a wolverine that he trained to search & rescue people and to have a game of hide & seek with a little bet. If the wolverine can find Hamish in less the 10 minutes the wolverine has to eat a rat of Hamish’s butt and if the wolverine doesn't Hamish has to eat a cupcake on the wolverine's back. Day 5 in Las Vegas, Nevada: Hamish hires 11 people to perform luck rituals on Andy, so that Andy can win every gambling game in Las Vegas and win more than a trillion dollars.
2	"Episode 2"	24 November 2019	792,000
Day 6 in Knik Glacier, Alaska: Hamish takes Andy to do dog sledding with dog sled racers Justin & Rebecca and their 40 dogs, but there was a secret twist. The twist is Andy has to wear a meat suit and run from point A to point B as fast as he can before the dogs catch him. Day 7 in Boulder, Colorado: Andy assemble a team of treasure hunters for Hamish, as they search for treasure worth $5 million buried somewhere in the Rocky Mountains by Forrest Fenn. Day 8 in Kentucky, US: Hamish made Andy eat a select delicacy known as cooked squirrel brains. Day 9 in Sheep Mountain, Alaska: Andy takes Hamish to a car yard where they launch cars in the air on Independence Day. There also wanted to try and see if a pizza can survive a car launch crash. Day 10 & 11 in Whittier, Alaska and Los Angeles, California: Hamish and Andy try to start their own business by selling drinks made out of an iceberg, which they called “Berg King Water”. They started by getting an iceberg in Whittier and then melt it into water. The next day they took the drinks to Los Angeles to find a business man to sell them to.
3	"Episode 3"	1 December 2019	665,000
Day 12 & 13 in Nordegg, Canada: Hamish and Andy spent the night in the Canadian wilderness with a guy name Todd who has been searching for Bigfoot (also known as Sasquatch) and to see if it is real. Day 14 in Topanga, California: Andy take Hamish to meet Dana, Kelly & Vince from The Laurel Canyon Animal Co. who makes music for animals. Then they challenge then to see who can make a song for Hamish’s cat Meowbert in 2 hours and see which song he likes best. Day 15 in Arlington, Texas: Hamish takes Andy to the Globe Life Park to make one of Andy’s dreams come by getting a home run in a short baseball game by getting 9 Innings, but he is going to be batting against a team by himself and he has to eat 9 “Big Deals” (9 hotdogs & 9 cokes) while playing. Day 16 in Dallas, Texas: Andy enrolled Hamish and himself at an auctioneer school called America’s Auction Academy to learn how to be an auctioneer. Then they challenge each other to see who can be the best auctioneer. Day 17 in Idaho Springs, Colorado: For the last day of their holiday, Hamish tricks Andy into ride a tandem bike with him to the top of Mount Blue Sky.

== See also ==
- Hamish and Andy's Gap Year
- Caravan of Courage
