= Logie Awards of 2012 =

54th annual Australian television awards

54th Logie Awards
- Date: 15 April 2012
- Site: Crown Palladium, Melbourne, Victoria

Highlights
- Gold Logie: Hamish Blake
- Hall of Fame: Molly Meldrum
- Most awards: Hamish and Andy's Gap Year, Packed to the Rafters, Paper Giants: The Birth of Cleo, The Slap and Spicks and Specks (2)
- Most nominations: Home and Away and Underbelly: Razor (7)

Television coverage
- Network: Nine Network

The 54th Annual TV Week Logie Awards was held on Sunday 15 April 2012 at the Crown Palladium in Melbourne, and broadcast on the Nine Network. Public voting for the "Most Popular" categories were conducted through an online survey from 5 December 2011 to 19 February 2012. Nominations were announced on 18 March 2012. The red carpet coverage which preceded the ceremony was hosted by Jules Lund, Sonia Kruger, Livinia Nixon and Shane Crawford. Musical performers at the event included One Direction, Flo Rida, Tony Bennett, Seal and Delta Goodrem.

== Winners and nominees ==
In the tables below, winners are listed first and highlighted in bold.

=== Gold Logie ===
Most Popular Personality on Australian Television
- **Hamish Blake in Hamish and Andy's Gap Year (Nine Network)**
  - Esther Anderson in Home and Away (Seven Network)
  - Carrie Bickmore in The Project (Network Ten)
  - Adam Hills in Spicks and Specks and Adam Hills in Gordon Street Tonight (ABC1)
  - Asher Keddie in Offspring (Network Ten) and Paper Giants: The Birth of Cleo (ABC1)
  - Karl Stefanovic in Today (Nine Network)

=== Acting/Presenting ===
Most Popular Actor	Most Popular Actress
**Hugh Sheridan in Packed to the Rafters (Seven Network)**; Daniel MacPherson in Wild Boys (Seven Network); Ray Meagher in Home and Away (Seven Network); Eddie Perfect in Offspring (Network Ten); Erik Thomson in Packed to the Rafters (Seven Network)	**Asher Keddie in Offspring (Network Ten) and Paper Giants: The Birth of Cleo (ABC1)**; Esther Anderson in Home and Away (Seven Network); Danielle Cormack in Underbelly: Razor (Nine Network) and East West 101 (SBS); Rebecca Gibney in Packed to the Rafters (Seven Network); Jessica Marais in Packed to the Rafters (Seven Network)
Most Outstanding Actor in a Series	Most Outstanding Actress in a Series
**Rob Carlton in Paper Giants: The Birth of Cleo (ABC1)**; Alex Dimitriades in The Slap (ABC1); Don Hany in East West 101 (SBS); Geoff Morrell in Cloudstreet (Showcase); David Wenham in Killing Time (TV1)	**Melissa George in The Slap (ABC1)**; Essie Davis in The Slap (ABC1); Diana Glenn in Killing Time (TV1); Asher Keddie in Paper Giants: The Birth of Cleo (ABC1); Kat Stewart in Offspring (Network Ten)
Most Popular New Male Talent	Most Popular New Female Talent
**Steve Peacocke in Home and Away (Seven Network)**; Dan Ewing in Home and Away (Seven Network); Peter Kuruvita in My Sri Lanka with Peter Kuruvita (SBS); James Mason in Neighbours (Network Ten); Tom Wren in Winners & Losers (Seven Network)	**Melissa Bergland in Winners & Losers (Seven Network)**; Chelsie Preston Crayford in Underbelly: Razor (Nine Network); Tiffiny Hall in The Biggest Loser (Network Ten); Demi Harman in Home and Away (Seven Network); Anna McGahan in Underbelly: Razor (Nine Network)
Most Outstanding New Talent	Most Popular Presenter
**Chelsie Preston Crayford in Underbelly: Razor (Nine Network)**; Melissa Bergland in Winners & Losers (Seven Network); Hamish Macdonald, Senior Foreign Correspondent (Network Ten); Anna McGahan in Underbelly: Razor (Network Nine); Hamish Michael in Crownies (ABC1)	**Adam Hills in Spicks and Specks and Adam Hills in Gordon Street Tonight (ABC1)**; Carrie Bickmore in The Project (Network Ten); Hamish Blake in Hamish and Andy's Gap Year (Nine Network); Karl Stefanovic in Today (Nine Network); Chrissie Swan in The Circle (Network Ten)

=== Most Popular Programs ===
Most Popular Drama Series	Most Popular Light Entertainment Program
**Packed to the Rafters (Seven Network)**; Home and Away (Seven Network); Offspring (Network Ten); Underbelly: Razor (Nine Network); Winners & Losers (Seven Network)	**Hamish and Andy's Gap Year (Nine Network)**; Australia's Got Talent (Seven Network); The Project (Network Ten); Spicks and Specks (ABC1); Sunrise (Seven Network)
Most Popular Lifestyle Program	Most Popular Factual Program
**Better Homes and Gardens (Seven Network)**; Getaway (Nine Network); iFish (Network Ten); Ready Steady Cook (Network Ten); Selling Houses Australia Extreme (The LifeStyle Channel)	**Bondi Rescue (Network Ten)**; Bondi Vet (Network Ten); Border Security: Australia's Front Line (Seven Network); RPA (Nine Network); The World's Strictest Parents (Seven Network)
Most Popular Sports Program	Most Popular Reality Program
**2011 AFL Grand Final (Network Ten)**; Before the Game (Network Ten); The Footy Show (AFL) (Nine Network); The Footy Show (NRL) (Nine Network); Wide World of Sports (Nine Network)	**The Block (Nine Network)**; Beauty and the Geek Australia (Seven Network); MasterChef Australia (Network Ten); My Kitchen Rules (Seven Network); The X Factor (Seven Network)

=== Most Outstanding Programs ===
Most Outstanding Drama Series, Miniseries or Telemovie	Most Outstanding Light Entertainment Program
**The Slap (ABC1)**; Cloudstreet (Showcase); Offspring (Network Ten); Paper Giants: The Birth of Cleo (ABC1); Underbelly: Razor (Nine Network)	**Spicks and Specks (ABC1)**; Australia's Got Talent (Seven Network); Gruen Planet (ABC1); The Project (Network Ten); Talkin' 'Bout Your Generation (Network Ten)
Most Outstanding Sports Coverage	Most Outstanding News Coverage
**2011 State of Origin – Game Three (Nine Network)**; 2011 Australian Open Tennis (Seven Network); 2011 Bathurst 1000 (Seven Network); 2011 Melbourne Cup Carnival (Seven Network); 2011 Tour de France (SBS)	**"The Queensland Floods", Nine News (Nine Network)**; "Lockyer Valley Flood", Seven News Brisbane (Seven Network); "Qantas Grounded", Sky News National (Sky News Australia); "Skype Scandal", Ten News at Five (Network Ten); "Unfinished Business", SBS World News Australia (SBS)
Most Outstanding Children's Program	Most Outstanding Public Affairs Report
**My Place (ABC3)**; Camp Orange: Wrong Town (Nickelodeon); Lockie Leonard (Nine Network); Saturday Disney (Seven Network); Scope (Network Ten)	**"A Bloody Business", Four Corners (ABC1)**; After The Deluge: The Valley (ABC1); "Rescue 500", Sunday Night (Seven Network); "Salma in the Square", Foreign Correspondent (ABC1); Tour of Duty: Australia's Secret War (Network Ten)
Most Outstanding Factual Program
**Go Back To Where You Came From (SBS)**; Leaky Boat (ABC1); Mrs Carey's Concert (ABC1); Outback Fight Club (SBS); Tony Robinson Explores Australia (The History Channel)

== Performers ==
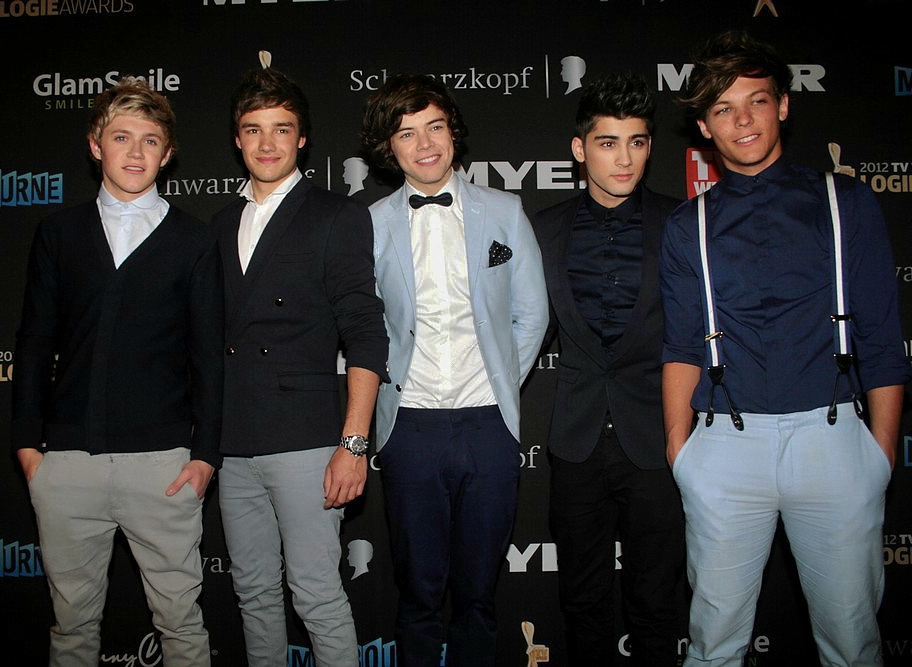
One Direction on the red carpet at the 2012 TV Week Logie Awards.

- Flo Rida
- One Direction
- Tony Bennett
- Seal
- Delta Goodrem

== Presenters ==
- Shaun Micallef
- Adam Hills
- Julia Morris
- Hamish Blake
- Andy Lee
- Dave Hughes

== In Memoriam ==
The In Memoriam segment was introduced by Mick Molloy who spoke of the passing of Bill Hunter. Bernard Fanning's "Watch Over Me" was played during the tribute. The following deceased were honoured:

- Sean Flannery, journalist
- Howard Rubic ACS, cinematographer
- Killer Karl Kox, WCW wrestler
- Martin Kosinar, actor
- Michele Fawdon, actress
- Diane Cilento, actress
- David Ngoombujarra, actor
- Ian Carroll, executive producer
- Carl Bleazby, actor
- John Bean, cameraman
- Gary Ticehurst, helicopter pilot
- Paul Lockyer, journalist
- Andy Whitfield, actor
- Harold Hopkins, actor
- Jay Dee Springbett, music executive, presenter
- Sheila Sibley, writer
- David Fordham, sports commentator
- Brian Williams, producer, director
- Jon Blake, actor
- Godfrey Philipp, creator Magic Circle Club
- Trish Ricketts, publicist
- Rex Mossop, sports broadcaster
- Zoran Janjic, animator
- Bill Newman, entertainer
- Wayne Fosternelli, floor manager
- Bernie Keenan, news chief of staff
- Lloyd Cunningham, actor
- Sarah Watt, writer, director
- Bob Davis, football commentator
- Cliff Neville, producer
- Robin Oliver, television critic
- Denise Morgan, writer
- Vince Lovegrove, musician, producer
- Googie Withers AO CBE, actress
- Reg Whiteman, original Fat Cat
- Peter Hepworth, writer
- Tikki Taylor, entertainer
- Keith Smith, children's TV producer, presenter
- Kristian Anderson, editor
- Ian Turpie, entertainer

During the tribute, an image of David Gulpilil was shown in place of David Ngoombujarra. Nine and TV Week later apologised for the error.
