= Ryan Shelton =

Australian comedian, actor, radio presenter, television personality, host and writer

Ryan Shelton is an Australian comedian, actor, radio presenter, television personality, host and writer.

== Early life ==
Shelton attended St Leonards College for some of his schooling, where he met Hamish Blake. He started his media career in Melbourne's community access media scene, hosting and producing shows for RMIT University's student television company RMITV, for Channel 31, and its campus radio station SYN.

Shelton plays mixed netball.

== Career ==
=== Television ===
With Hamish Blake and Andy Lee, Shelton wrote and co-starred in Hamish & Andy (2004) and Real Stories (2006). He was also a co-writer of Chris Lilley's award-winning We Can Be Heroes: Finding The Australian of the Year (2005).

In 2007, Shelton became a regular cast member on television series Rove. His signature segment in 2007 was called "Rydeas" (a portmanteau of 'Ryan' and 'ideas'). In 2008, he started a new segment called Investigationing (a neologism) and in 2009, introduced a segment called "Philosophisationing'".

Shelton appeared on the improvisational comedy Thank God You're Here, produced by the award-winning Working Dog Productions. He featured on Hamish and Andy's Gap Year, with his own segment "100 second New York lesson'd", appearing from the second episode onwards. He also appeared briefly on TwentySomething.

In 2017, Shelton co-produced True Story with Hamish & Andy. He starred in the fourth episode, playing the part of storyteller Emidio Boto, a teacher in his first year of the job.

In 2024, Shelton had a small role in the Amazon Prime film Ricky Stanicky.

=== Radio ===
Shelton was an occasional co-host on the radio show Get This. He also appeared on Red Hot Go, a late night radio show on Fox FM in Melbourne on Monday nights. In December 2007, he presented the Summer Fling breakfast show across the Austereo Today Network with Jules Lund and Tamsyn Lewis.

In February 2008, Shelton joined Nova FM to present a Saturday morning breakfast program Ryan & Monty with Katie Dimond ('Monty'), airing from 10am to 12pm. From January 2009 to 2010, he hosted the Nova FM drive time slot on Ryan, Monty & Wippa between 4-6pm weekdays with Katie Dimond (aka Monty) and Michael 'Wippa' Wipfli. Lachy Hulme performed many of the voiceovers for the show.

=== Podcasts ===
In 2011, Shelton released a series of one-minute episodes for a podcast called For One Minute Only, in which he sardonically and ironically laid waste to the rumour that he would not be releasing a series of weekly podcasts. In addition to this tongue-in-cheek and short-lived podcast, Shelton has made guest appearances on several other podcasts, including The Hamish & Andy Show, Little Dum Dum Club, Josh Speaking, and The Binge Podcast.

Shelton co-hosts The Imperfects podcast as part of The Resilience Project with Hugh and Josh van Cuylenburg.
