= Logie Awards of 2013 =

Australian television awards ceremony

55th Logie Awards
- Date: 7 April 2013
- Site: Crown Palladium, Melbourne, Victoria

Highlights
- Gold Logie: Asher Keddie
- Hall of Fame: Brian Henderson
- Most awards: Howzat! Kerry Packer's War, Offspring, Redfern Now, The Voice (2)
- Most nominations: Offspring (8)

Television coverage
- Network: Nine Network

The 55th Annual TV Week Logie Awards was held on Sunday 7 April 2013 at the Crown Palladium in Melbourne, and broadcast on the Nine Network and simulcast of Today Network's radio stations. Public voting for the "Most Popular" categories were conducted through an online survey from late November 2012 to 10 February 2013. Nominations were announced on 11 March 2013. Network Ten's Offspring received the most nominations with eight. Hamish and Andy's Euro Gap Year, Hamish and Andy's Caravan of Courage: Australia Vs New Zealand, Home and Away, Howzat! Kerry Packer's War, and Puberty Blues each received five nominations. Television presenter Brian Henderson was inducted into the Logies Hall of Fame.

== Winners and nominees ==
In the tables below, winners are listed first and highlighted in bold.

=== Gold Logie ===
Most Popular Personality on Australian Television
- **Asher Keddie in Offspring (Network Ten)**
  - Adam Hills in Adam Hills in Gordon Street Tonight (ABC1)
  - Andy Lee in Hamish and Andy's Euro Gap Year and Hamish and Andy's Caravan of Courage: Australia Vs New Zealand (Nine Network)
  - Carrie Bickmore in The Project (Network Ten)
  - Hamish Blake in Hamish and Andy's Euro Gap Year and Hamish and Andy's Caravan of Courage: Australia Vs New Zealand (Nine Network)
  - Steve Peacocke in Home and Away (Seven Network)

=== Acting/Presenting ===
Most Popular Actor	Most Popular Actress
**Steve Peacocke in Home and Away (Seven Network)**; Firass Dirani in House Husbands (Nine Network) and The Straits (ABC1); Hugh Sheridan in Packed to the Rafters (Seven Network); Lachy Hulme in Howzat! Kerry Packer's War (Nine Network), Beaconsfield (Nine Network), and Offspring (Network Ten); Matthew Le Nevez in Offspring (Network Ten)	**Asher Keddie in Offspring (Network Ten)**; Ashleigh Cummings in Puberty Blues (Network Ten) and Miss Fisher's Murder Mysteries (ABC1); Deborah Mailman in Mabo (ABC1), Redfern Now (ABC1), and Offspring (Network Ten); Julia Morris in House Husbands (Nine Network); Rebecca Gibney in Packed to the Rafters (Seven Network)
Most Outstanding Actor	Most Outstanding Actress
**Anthony Hayes in Devil's Dust (ABC1)**; Aaron Jeffery in Underbelly: Badness (Nine Network); Guy Pearce in Jack Irish (ABC1); Jimi Bani in Mabo (ABC1); Lachy Hulme in Howzat! Kerry Packer's War (Nine Network)	**Deborah Mailman in Mabo (ABC1)**; Catherine McClements in Tangle (Showcase); Leah Purcell in Redfern Now (ABC1); Mandy McElhinney in Howzat! Kerry Packer's War (Nine Network); Susie Porter in Dangerous Remedy (ABC1)
Most Popular New Male Talent	Most Popular New Female Talent
**Joel Madden in The Voice (Nine Network)**; Alex Williams in Underground: The Julian Assange Story (Network Ten); David Campbell in Mornings (Nine Network); Robert Irwin in Steve Irwin's Wildlife Warriors (Network Ten); Will McDonald in Home and Away (Seven Network)	**Brenna Harding in Puberty Blues (Network Ten)**; Annabel Crabb in Kitchen Cabinet (ABC2); Catherine Mack in Home and Away (Seven Network); Clare Bowditch in Offspring (Network Ten); Edwina Royce in House Husbands (Nine Network)
Graham Kennedy Award for Most Outstanding New Talent	Most Popular TV Presenter
**Shari Sebbens in Redfern Now (ABC1)**; Annabel Crabb in Kitchen Cabinet (ABC2); Brenna Harding in Puberty Blues (Network Ten); Jason Montgomery in Underbelly: Badness (Nine Network); Natasa Ristic in Danger 5 (SBS One)	**Hamish Blake in Hamish and Andy's Euro Gap Year and Hamish and Andy's Caravan of Courage: Australia Vs New Zealand (Nine Network)**; Adam Hills in Adam Hills in Gordon Street Tonight (ABC1); Andy Lee in Hamish and Andy's Euro Gap Year and Hamish and Andy's Caravan of Courage: Australia Vs New Zealand (Nine Network); Carrie Bickmore in The Project (Network Ten); Chrissie Swan in Can of Worms (Network Ten)

=== Most Popular Programs ===
Most Popular Australian Drama	Most Popular Miniseries or Telemovie
**House Husbands (Nine Network)**; Home and Away (Seven Network); Offspring (Network Ten); Packed to the Rafters (Seven Network); Puberty Blues (Network Ten)	**Howzat! Kerry Packer's War (Nine Network)**; Beaconsfield (Nine Network); Bikie Wars: Brothers in Arms (Network Ten); Underbelly: Badness (Nine Network); Underground: The Julian Assange Story (Network Ten)
Most Popular Light Entertainment Program	Most Popular Reality Program
**The Voice (Nine Network)**; Gruen Planet (ABC1); Hamish and Andy's Euro Gap Year (Nine Network); The Project (Network Ten); The X Factor (Seven Network)	**The Block (Nine Network)**; Beauty and the Geek Australia (Seven Network); Big Brother (Nine Network); MasterChef Australia (Network Ten); My Kitchen Rules (Seven Network)
Most Popular Sports Program	Most Popular Lifestyle Program
**The Footy Show (NRL) (Nine Network)**; Before the Game (Network Ten); Paralympics London 2012 – Highlights (ABC1); The Footy Show (AFL) (Nine Network); Wide World of Sports (Nine Network)	**Better Homes and Gardens (Seven Network)**; Getaway (Nine Network); Grand Designs Australia (The LifeStyle Channel); The Living Room (Network Ten); Selling Houses Australia (The LifeStyle Channel)
Most Popular Factual Program
**Bondi Rescue (Network Ten)**; Bondi Vet (Network Ten); Border Security: Australia's Front Line (Seven Network); RPA (Nine Network); Who Do You Think You Are? (SBS One)

=== Most Outstanding Programs ===
Most Outstanding Drama Series	Most Outstanding Miniseries or Telemovie
**Redfern Now (ABC1)**; Offspring (Network Ten); Puberty Blues (Network Ten); Rake (ABC1); Tangle (Showcase)	**Howzat! Kerry Packer's War (Nine Network)**; Jack Irish (ABC1); Mabo (ABC1); Underbelly: Badness (Nine Network); Underground: The Julian Assange Story (Network Ten)
Most Outstanding Light Entertainment Program	Most Outstanding Children's Program
**The X Factor (Seven Network)**; Hamish and Andy's Caravan of Courage: Australia Vs New Zealand (Nine Network); Shaun Micallef's Mad as Hell (ABC1); The Hamster Wheel (ABC1); The Voice (Nine Network)	**Dance Academy (ABC3)**; The Adventures of Figaro Pho (ABC3); Didi and B (Nick Jr.); Totally Wild (Network Ten); You're Skitting Me (ABC3)
Most Outstanding News Coverage	Most Outstanding Public Affairs Report
**"Catholic Church Allegedly Hid Crimes of Paedophile Priests", Lateline (ABC1)**; "Baden-Clay", Nine News (Nine Network); "Cabinet Leaks", Seven News Sydney (Seven Network); "Fukushima", ABC News (ABC1); "Rudd Vs Gillard Leadership Challenge", Sky News	**"Captain Emad: Smugglers' Paradise – Australia", Four Corners (ABC1)**; "Abducted!", 60 Minutes (Nine Network); "Anatomy of a Massacre", Dateline (SBS One); "The World According to Lance (Lance Armstrong)", Four Corners (ABC1); "Unholy Silence (Catholic Church)", Four Corners (ABC1)
Most Outstanding Sports Coverage	Most Outstanding Factual Program
**London 2012 Olympic Games (Foxtel)**; 2012 Emirates Melbourne Cup Carnival (Seven Network); London 2012 Olympic Games (Nine Network); 2012 Toyota AFL Grand Final (Seven Network); Boxing Day Test Match (Nine Network)	**Go Back To Where You Came From (SBS One)**; AFP (Nine Network); Kings Cross ER (Crime & Investigation Network); Then The Wind Changed (ABC1); Who Do You Think You Are? (SBS One)

== Presenters ==
- Hamish Blake
- Andy Lee
- Adam Hills
- Dave Hughes
- Julia Morris
- Shane Bourne
- Lisa Wilkinson
- Rebecca Gibney
- Eddie Perfect
- Scott Cam
- Kat Stewart
- Shane Jacobson
- Sonia Kruger
- Jennifer Byrne
- Mandy McElhinney
- Jenny Brockie
- Bert Newton
- Molly Meldrum
- Olly Murs
- Chris Brown
- Hugh Sheridan
- Jennifer Hawkins
- Richard Wilkins
- Carrie Bickmore
- David Campbell
- Craig Reucassel
- Julian Morrow
- Darren McMullen
- Mike Munro
- Michelle Bridges
- Karl Stefanovic

== Performers ==
- Bruno Mars – "Locked Out of Heaven"
- Michael Bublé – "It's a Beautiful Day"
- Birdy – "Skinny Love"
- Olly Murs – "Army of Two"

== Most nominations ==
By network

- Nine Network – 37
- ABC – 32
- Network Ten – 28
- Seven Network – 17
- Foxtel – 8
- SBS – 5

By program

- Offspring (Network Ten) – 8
- Hamish and Andy's Euro Gap Year (Nine Network) / Hamish and Andy's Caravan of Courage: Australia Vs New Zealand (Nine Network) / Home and Away (Seven Network) / Howzat! Kerry Packer's War (Nine Network) / Puberty Blues (Network Ten) – 5
- House Husbands (Nine Network) / Mabo (ABC1) / Redfern Now (ABC1) / Underbelly: Badness (Nine Network) – 4
- Four Corners (ABC1) / Packed to the Rafters (Seven Network) / The Project (Network Ten) / Underground: The Julian Assange Story (Network Ten) / The Voice (Nine Network) – 3

== Most awards ==
By network

- Nine Network – 8
- ABC – 7
- Network Ten – 4
- Seven Network – 3
- SBS / Foxtel – 1

By program

- Howzat! Kerry Packer's War (Nine Network) / Offspring (Network Ten) / Redfern Now (ABC1) / The Voice (Nine Network) – 2

== In Memoriam ==
The In Memoriam segment was introduced by Peter Overton who spoke of the passing of Peter Harvey. The Melbourne Gospel Choir performed Foo Fighters "Times Like These". The following deceased were honoured:

- Suzie Howie, publicist
- Brian Wright, executive
- Jonathan Hardy, actor
- Binny Lum, host
- Max Stuart, executive
- Alan Bateman, writer, producer
- Bille Brown AM, actor
- Craig Watkins, cameraman
- Jon Finlayson, actor
- Peter Skelton, cameraman
- Tony Charlton AM, broadcaster
- Len Mauger, executive
- Leverne McDonnell, actress
- Bryce Courtenay AM, author, producer, screenwriter
- Digby Wolfe, writer, host
- Patricia Lovell AM MBE, host
- Bob Meillon, director
- Colin Campbell OAM, presenter
- Nick McMahon, executive
- Albie Thoms, director, producer
- Edith Bliss, presenter
- Colin Duckworth, actor, writer
- Ron Taylor AM, cameraman
- Darryl Cotton, host
- John Miller, broadcaster
- Dr. Tommy Tycho AM MBE, maestro
- Bruce Robertson, engineer
- Anne Dunn, journalist
- Peter Dean, broadcaster, producer
- Tony Greig, broadcaster
