= Celebrating 50 Glorious Years =

Compilation album by Hamish & Andy
- Released: 26 November 2010
- Recorded: 2008–2010
- Genre: Comedy

Hamish & Andy chronology
Unessential Listening (2008)	Celebrating 50 Glorious Years (2010)

Celebrating 50 Glorious Years is a 2-disc compilation album by the comedy duo Hamish & Andy. It features segments included on their radio show between 2008 and 2010.

At the ARIA Music Awards of 2011, the album won Best Comedy Release.

== Track listings ==
=== Disc 1 ===
1. Megaphone
2. The Double Up Blast from the Past
3. The Old Internet
4. Spying
5. Drunk Gorillas
6. Apple Store Dad
7. Chilean Miners
8. Big Dog Genitals
9. The Treadmill Saga
10. Cane Toads
11. Criminal Mastermind - Lotto Ticket
12. Flying Cars
13. Andy Loses His Front Teeth
14. Ultimate 'I Told You So'
15. Another Injury
16. Cow Man
17. The Tooth Fairy
18. Horgs' Invention
19. K-Rudd's Plan
20. The Breast Rest
21. Fish & Chips Password
22. Eating Special Things
23. Swim-Up Bar
24. Recruiting For Santa
25. The Vague Out
26. John Stamos
27. Old Signatures
28. The Ultimate Chick Flick
29. Misdirected Text Message
30. Andy's Cyborg
31. Swine Flu
32. Cyclone Hamish
33. Andy's Potty Mouth
34. Bad Present
35. Cheese Twisties
36. Skip Scavengers
37. Lady Fingers
38. David Attenborough
39. Baha Men the Musical
40. Mobile Phone Use
41. Baby Showers
42. Ordour Eating Upholstery
43. Poor Man's Version
44. Family Suggestions
45. Sexy Cricket
46. Fake Names

=== Disc 2 ===
1. High Level Perving
2. Hamish's Top 40 CD
3. Take The Snake Debate
4. Andy's Mum's Message
5. Antiques Roadshow
6. Who's Milhouse, Who's Bart
7. Scary Puppets
8. EA Sports
9. Criminal Mastermind - Sydney Roosters
10. A Dog in the School
11. Turtle Weapon
12. Randy Russell Brand
13. Heidi Klum's Body
14. Andy Made It
15. Girlfriend Holiday
16. Easter Bonnet Parades
17. Energy Company
18. Blast From The Past - Dirt Bike
19. Hamish Revisits Scotland
20. Futuristic Toilet
21. Baby Names
22. The Greatest Prank Ever
23. Car Steering
24. Goodbye My Google
25. Nicknames
26. Diamond Scrimping
27. Teaching Kids
28. Pete Helliar Double Bluff
29. Hamish's Weight
30. Adobe Stitch Up
31. Bad Smell
32. Door Alarm
33. Sick Voices
34. The Big Pineapple
35. Love Knows No Age
36. Pants Off Jack
37. Whitney Houston
38. Moving Out Present
39. Large Hadron Collider
40. Caravan of Courage 2
41. Van Attachment
42. Fred Basset In the Future
43. Unessential Bits

== Charts ==
=== Weekly charts ===
Chart (2010/11)	Peak position
Australian Albums (ARIA)	6

=== Year-end charts ===
Chart (2010)	Position
Australian Albums (ARIA)	56

== Certifications ==
Region	Certification	Certified units/sales
Australia (ARIA)	Gold	35,000^{^}
^{^} Shipments figures based on certification alone.

== See also ==
- Hamish & Andy (radio show)
