= Zoë Foster Blake =

Australian author, columnist, and businesswoman (born 1980)

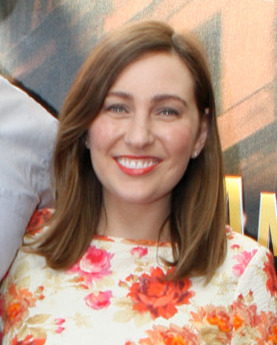
- Zoë Foster Blake in 2020
- Born: Zoë Foster; 28 July 1980 (age 46); Bowral, New South Wales, Australia
- Occupations: Author; columnist; editor; entrepreneur
- Spouse: Hamish Blake (m. 2012)
- Children: 2
- Father: David Foster
- Website: zotheysay.com

Zoë Foster Blake (born 28 July 1980) is an Australian author, skin care founder and entrepreneur.

== Early life ==
Zoë Foster Blake was born Zoë Foster on in Bowral, New South Wales, and was raised in Bundanoon, New South Wales. Her father is the novelist David Foster and her mother Gerda Busch is a counsellor. She is the youngest in a blended family of eight children. She studied media and communications at the University of New South Wales.

== Career ==
=== Writing ===
Foster Blake began her writing career in magazines, including Smash Hits, Cosmopolitan and Harper's Bazaar, before blogging full-time and writing as a columnist. She has written 17 books and one audiobook. She is primarily published by Penguin Books Australia. Five non-fiction: Amazing Face, a beauty tips and tricks guide; Textbook Romance, a relationship advice book for young women co-authored with her husband Hamish Blake; and Break-Up Boss, which offers practical advice for the brokenhearted, Amazinger Face and Love!. She has also published five novels: Air Kisses, Playing The Field, The Younger Man, The Wrong Girl and Things Will Calm Down Soon. In 2020, she released Clean Slate, a novella audiobook narrated by Stephen Curry and published by Audible.

In 2017, she published her first children's picture book, No One Likes a Fart. It won the 2018 Australian Book Industry (ABIA) Awards Children's Picture Book of the Year. In 2020, Foster Blake published her second children's book, Back to Sleep, which was followed by Fart and Burp are Superstinkers in 2021, Scaredy Bath and Battle Mum in 2022, Fart's Favourite Smells in 2023, and The Best Present Ever in 2024.

In November 2015, Network Ten announced it would screen a television show called The Wrong Girl in 2016, which was based on her novel of the same name. It ran for two seasons. Her newest novel, Things Will Calm Down Soon, has been optioned by Made Up Stories.

=== Business ===
In April 2014, Foster Blake launched a skincare brand, Go-To. In 2016, she launched a men's skincare line, Bro-To, and in 2019 she launched a children's bath and body range, Gro-To. In August 2021, BWX Group purchased a 50.1 per cent stake in Go-To for $89 million. BWX went into voluntary administration in April 2023 and, in December 2023, Foster Blake and Go-To co-founder Paul Bates bought back BWX's stake in Go-To.

=== Other work ===
She launched a break-up app called Break-Up Boss in April 2017, which donates 10% of every sale to Safe Steps. She published the Break-Up Boss book in April 2018.

She is an ambassador for Tourism Australia, and Look Good Feel Better.

== Personal life ==
In December 2012, Foster Blake married Australian TV and radio personality Hamish Blake in a private ceremony at Wolgan Valley, New South Wales, Australia. They have one son, Sonny Donald Blake, born 10 May 2014, and one daughter, Rudy Hazel Blake, born 17 July 2017.

== Bibliography ==
=== Non-fiction ===
- 2009: Textbook Romance. (co-authored with Hamish Blake). Penguin Books Australia. ISBN 978-0143009474.
- 2011: Amazing Face: clever beauty tricks, should-own products + spectacularly useful how-to-do-its. Penguin Books Australia. ISBN 978-0670075256.
- 2018: Break-Up Boss. Penguin Books Australia. ISBN 9780143785620.
- 2016: Amazinger Face. Penguin Books Australia. ISBN 9780670078233.
- 2019: Love! An Enthusiastic and Modern Perspective on Matters of the Heart. Penguin Books Australia. ISBN 9780143788775.

=== Novels ===
- 2009: Air Kisses. Penguin Books Australia. ISBN 978-0749007270.
- 2011: Playing The Field. Penguin Books Australia. ISBN 978-1921518010.
- 2012: The Younger Man. Penguin Books Australia. ISBN 9781921518607.
- 2014: The Wrong Girl. Penguin Books Australia. ISBN 978-1921901270.
- 2024: Things Will Calm Down Soon. Atlantic Books Australia. ISBN 9781922928023.

=== Audiobooks ===
- 2020: Clean Slate. Audible.

=== Children's books ===
- 2017: No One Likes A Fart. Penguin Books Australia. ISBN 9780143786603.
- 2020: Back To Sleep. Penguin Books Australia. ISBN 9781760897901.
- 2021: Fart and Burp are Superstinkers. Penguin Books Australia. ISBN 9781761043451.
- 2022: Scaredy Bath. Penguin Books Australia. ISBN 9780593520635.
- 2022: Battle Mum. Penguin Books Australia. ISBN 9780143779704.
- 2023: Fart's Favourite Smells. Penguin Books Australia. ISBN 9781761341595.
- 2024: The Best Present Ever. Penguin Books Australia. ISBN 9781761343711.
