= Unessential Listening =

Compilation album by Hamish & Andy
- Released: 29 November 2008
- Recorded: 2006–2008
- Genre: Comedy
- Length: Disc 1: 78 minutes Disc 2: 70 minutes
- Labels: Austereo; Sony BMG; Roadshow Music
- Producer: Sam Cavanagh

Hamish & Andy chronology
Unessential Listening (2008)	Celebrating 50 Glorious Years (2010)

Unessential Listening is a 2-disc compilation album by the comedy duo Hamish & Andy. It features segments included on their radio show between 2006 and 2008.

At the ARIA Music Awards of 2009, the album won the ARIA Award for Best Comedy Release.

== Track list ==
Disc one

1. High Arse Crack
2. Adam And Eve
3. Albino Song
4. Inflight Magazine
5. Daarvid
6. Hill Related Sayings
7. Red Headucation Week
8. Blast From The Past: Andy's A Woman
9. Kamahl Calls From Heaven
10. Upset Girlfriends
11. Edward Scissorhands The Musical
12. Shopkeepers Trick
13. The Worst Lyrics of All Time
14. Greg's Dog
15. Rent-a-baby
16. Eating Plan
17. Telemarketers
18. Science
19. Bum Roll On
20. $360 Billion Cheque
21. Defending The Base in Afghanistan
22. Cats
23. Party Fouls
24. Jack's Betrayal
25. Airport Toilets
26. Supporting Call Centres
27. Horgs' Inventions
28. John Farnham The Musical
29. Hab's
30. Dad's Vendetta
31. The Aussie Star Wars
32. Sex Excuses Song
33. Food Delivery
34. Blast From The Past: Hamish's Urine Sample
35. Nanny
36. Ghost at the Palace Hotel
37. The Pope-mobile
38. Ribena Berry Apology
39. Pamela Anderson
40. The Happy Country & Western Song
41. Bad Management Fads
42. The First Ever Radio Prank
43. Andy's Deposit

Disc two

1. Save The Pandas
2. Hottest 100 Ads
3. John Bucknell Trio
4. Shops Closing
5. Security Guards
6. Faker Song
7. Horgs' Thoughts
8. Shooting Cannons in Afghanistan
9. Love Songs And Dedications
10. Blast From The Past: Andy Is A Lord
11. Moosie's Affair
12. Dentist
13. 5 Second Memory Call
14. Boonie
15. Phone Flirt
16. Hamish & Andy Are Music
17. Awesome April Fools' Day Prank
18. Jingles
19. The People's Chip
20. Todd McKenney's Defence
21. Lisp
22. Lie Detector Test
23. Name & Shame Game
24. Cure For Cancer
25. Adopt An Attention Seeker
26. Beijing Ceremony
27. Honest Love Song
28. Memoirs of a Geezer
29. Fosca
30. Two Voices One Person Call
31. Steve Curry's Logie Hunt
32. Lying Instructional Video
33. Adult Toy Party
34. Hi-tech Pope
35. Box Hedges
36. Blast From The Past: Hamish's Psychic Prediction
37. Nurse
38. Pete Blanks
39. Japanese Soft Ball
40. Photo Surprise
41. Ray Martin's Not Boring
42. Black & Gold
43. Unessential Bonus Track

== Charts ==
=== Weekly charts ===
Chart (2008–09)	Peak position
Australian Albums (ARIA)	4

=== Year-end charts ===
Chart (2008)	Position
Australian Albums (ARIA)	22

== Certifications ==
Region	Certification	Certified units/sales
Australia (ARIA)	Platinum	70,000^{^}
^{^} Shipments figures based on certification alone.

== See also ==
- Hamish & Andy (radio show)
