= Hamish Blake =

Australian comedian (born 1981)

Hamish Blake OAM
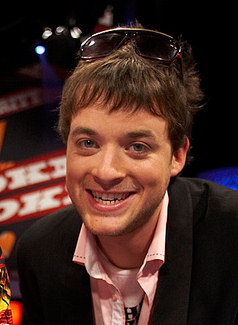
- Hamish Blake in 2005
- Born: Hamish Donald Blake; 11 December 1981 (age 44); Melbourne, Victoria, Australia
- Education: Caulfield Grammar School; St Leonard's College; University of Melbourne
- Spouse: Zoe Foster (m. 2012)
- Children: 2

Comedy career
- Years active: 2002–present
- Medium: Stand-up, television, radio
- Website: hamishandandy.com

Hamish Donald Blake OAM (born 11 December 1981) is an Australian comedian, television and radio presenter, actor and author. Since 2003, he has worked with Andy Lee as part of the comedy duo Hamish and Andy. The pair have performed live and on television and radio, most notably with their drive-time radio program Hamish & Andy. As a solo performer, Blake has appeared on various Australian television programs, including the Melbourne International Comedy Festival's televised 2008 Great Debate, and has been a regular guest on TV programs such as Spicks and Specks, Rove, and Thank God You're Here.

In April 2012, Blake and Lee won a Logie Award for their television program Hamish and Andy's Gap Year. Individually, Blake is a two-time winner of the Gold Logie Award for Most Popular Personality on Australian Television, winning the award in 2012 for Hamish and Andy's Gap Year and in 2022 for Lego Masters. In 2022, Blake was the recipient of the TV Week Bert Newton Award for most outstanding presenter.

== Early life ==
Blake grew up in the Melbourne suburb of Glen Waverley. He is a middle child; his older brother, Lachlan, is a solicitor, and his sister, Sophie, has completed an arts degree. His parents, Noel and Kerry, separated when Blake was 17, with his father eventually remarrying. As a child, Blake says he was a fan of British comedy such as Monty Python, Fawlty Towers and Blackadder; as a teenager, he "worshipped" comedians Tony Martin and Mick Molloy. Blake was a member of the National Boys Choir of Australia during the late 1980s. He attended primary school at Glen Waverley South Primary, while he went to high school at Caulfield Grammar School and later at St Leonard's College, graduating in 1999.

After a gap year, Blake enrolled at the University of Melbourne in a Science/Commerce double degree. Blake recalled, "I'm interested in artificial intelligence and computer science. That stuff still fascinates me," he says. However, a few weeks into the semester, he met Andy Lee, with Blake later saying: "That was the turning point. The wheels quickly fell off my academic career." Blake eventually dropped out of university to pursue a career in comedy alongside Lee. Blake's first experience with comedy was when he entered a competition at university. He was broke at the time, and he hoped to win the $500 first prize. His stand-up performance earned him third place and qualified him for a statewide universities' final, which he won.

== Career ==
=== Hamish and Andy ===
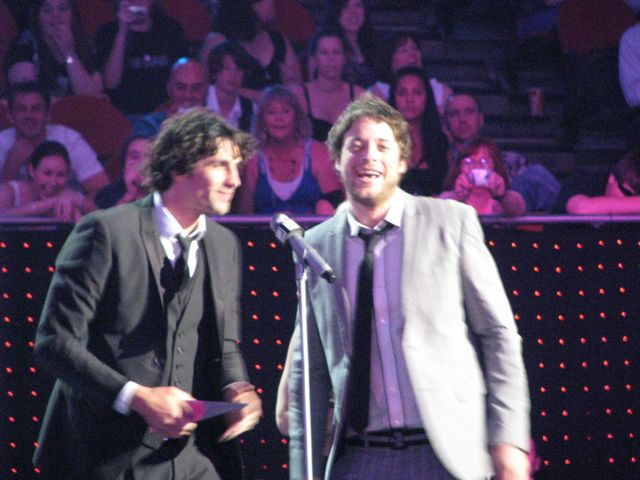
Andy Lee (left) and Blake (right) at the 2009 ARIA Awards

Hamish Blake has collaborated with fellow comedian Andy Lee as the duo Hamish and Andy since 2003, when they performed their breakout show at the Melbourne International Comedy Festival, a stage production about a trip they had taken to North Queensland in Blake's old car. Soon after, they trained with SYN Radio, gaining a drive-time shift, and created a show called Radio Karate for RMITV on community-access television station Channel 31, which they created in collaboration with Ryan Shelton and several other school friends. Radio Karate won an Antenna Award for best comedy program at the inaugural National Community Television Awards in February 2004, and one month later they were offered a national comedy program on Australia's Seven Network.

The Hamish and Andy Show premiered on the Seven Network in March 2005, but it failed to achieve ratings success and was cancelled after two weeks. Reviewers acknowledged the duo's talent but criticised the show as "poorly executed". Blake says that while working on the show was a fun experience, they had little control over what happened and the way it went forward. Following the cancellation of The Hamish and Andy Show, they created a short mockumentary titled The Greystone 2800 about a couple who accidentally bought an open display home after failing to read the fine print on a housing purchase. The film won the Melbourne Comedy Festival Short Film competition and attracted the attention of comedian Rove McManus. This led to some small spots on McManus's Network Ten show Rove Live.

McManus's company, Roving Enterprises, also helped the duo develop Real Stories, a mock current affairs show that aired on Network Ten in 2006. Blake says that the experience of creating Real Stories was much more enjoyable than The Hamish and Andy Show because they had greater control over the series. Blake and Lee wrote, acted, directed, filmed, and produced the show with input from Ryan Shelton and Tim Bartley.

In 2006, Blake and Lee debuted a national drive-time radio show titled Hamish & Andy on the Today Network. The show quickly gained popularity, finishing 2006 with almost one million Melbourne listeners, ahead of 3AW's popular radio host Derryn Hinch. By August 2008, Blake and Lee's show was rating number one in four out of Australia's five major capital cities. By the beginning of 2009, the show was broadcast in all capital cities as well as many regional centres across the country.

In September 2008, it was announced that they would make a guest appearance on Ten's Are You Smarter Than A 5th Grader?, which was hosted by Rove McManus. In the same year they also made a guest appearance on the Australian soap opera Neighbours.

On Wednesday 19 November 2008, at 7.30 pm, Hamish and Andy aired their own one-time episode, brought to you by Rove: Hamish & Andy Re-Gifted: A Very Early Christmas Special. This was to re-present everything they had accomplished in 2008 on Rove.

Hamish and Andy have also appeared on Channel Ten's Good News Week and The Project several times.

He is a founding member of a "rock-insult" band, Coolboys and the Frontman, along with Andy Lee and Jack Post.

=== Solo work ===
Blake has appeared on various Australian television series, including Spicks and Specks, Thank God You're Here, Twentysomething, Australia's Brainiest Comedian, The Librarians, The Panel, Rove, Talkin' 'bout your Generation and The Footy Show. He has also featured in the British version of Thank God You're Here. In 2008, he was a speaker for the negative team in the Melbourne International Comedy Festival's annual televised Great Debate.

He had a monthly column in the Australian women's magazine Cosmopolitan. He was also the winner of the TV Fugly Award for Spunkiest Male TV Personality in 2008. Hamish Blake was voted the comedian of the year in 2007 by the Eather corporation. His compatriot Andy Lee was placed 14th for 2007. Blake also came first in 'Television's most powerful celebrity' for 2009; Lee came 19th.

On 20 January 2010, it was announced Hamish would be writing a column for the Herald Sun.

Hamish, along with his wife Zoë Foster Blake, has written a book on dating called Textbook Romance.

After scaling back his daily radio show to a weekly radio show and podcast, Hamish took on several new side projects. In 2011, Blake made an appearance in the ABC comedy Twentysomething, starring real-life best friends Jess Harris and Josh Schmidt. He also co-starred in his first feature film with Bret McKenzie of Flight of the Conchords, Two Little Boys, shot in New Zealand Hamish joked: "I don't feel comfortable about cheating on Andy but now it's all out there. We've always had an open comedic relationship, but it was for one-night stands only, with no exchange of phone numbers. I've heard them [Andy and Jemaine Clement, Bret's comedic partner] whispering on the phone, plotting to do their own movie to release on the same day to sink ours."

In 2019, it was announced that Blake would be joining Nine Network's brand-new reality competition series titled Lego Masters Australia, as the series host alongside judge Ryan McNaught. In 2021, Nine announced that Blake would hast a new Lego Masters Christmas special spinoff series, titled Lego Masters Bricksmas Specials, which saw celebrities be paired up with former Lego Masters contestant over two episodes, competing for a $20,000 donation to the Kmart Wishing Tree.

In October 2022, Blake launched a podcast called How Other Dads Dad with Hamish Blake. The first season saw guests such as fellow fathers Rob Sitch, Adam Hills, Stan Grant, Max Gawn, Dave Hughes, and Ben Lee. Unskilled Adult, a Stan Original series presented by Blake, will premiere on 1 November 2026.

== Personal life ==
Hamish married Zoë Foster Blake in 2012. They have two children: Sonny and Rudy.

== Filmography ==
=== Actor ===
Year	Title	Role	Notes
2006	Real Stories	Various	8 episodes
2008	Neighbours	Fred	1 episode
2009	The Librarians	Jake Jackson	1 episode
2010	I Love You Too	Patrick	
2012	Two Little Boys	Deano	
2011–2013	Twentysomething	Billy	12 episodes
2015	Now Add Honey	Alex Kilstein	
2016	Molly	Television Crew	TV miniseries
2016	The Wrong Girl	Hamilton	
2018	Ralph Breaks the Internet	Pyro (voice)	
2021–present	Bluey	Jack's Dad (voice)	

=== As himself ===
Year	Title	Notes
2004	Royal Children's Hospital Good Friday Appeal 2004	TV movie documentary
2004	Hamish & Andy	6 episodes
2005	Australia's Brainiest Kid	1 episode
2006	Dancing with the Stars	1 episode
2006	The 20th Annual ARIA Awards	Host
2007	The 2007 TV Week Movie Awards	Host
2007	Live Earth	Documentary
2007	'Little Britain' Down Under	
2007	The Panel	1 episode
2008	Thank God You're Here	2 episodes, UK TV series
2008	The 50th Annual TV Week Logie Awards	
2008	The Footy Show	1 episode
2009	Australia Unites: The Victorian Bushfire Appeal	
2006–2009	Thank God You're Here	10 episodes
2009	The Chaser's War on Everything	1 episode
2009	The Making of 'The Librarians'	Video documentary short
2009	The Jay Leno Show	2 episodes
2005–2009	Rove Live	40 episodes
2010	Sleuth 101	1 episode
2010	50th Annual TV Week Logie Awards	
2010	Good News Week	1 episode
2010	The Graham Norton Show	1 episode
2009–2010	Talkin' 'Bout Your Generation	3 episodes
2009–2010	The Project	20 episodes
2011	Hamish & Andy's Gap Year	20 episodes
2005–2011	Spicks & Specks	53 episodes
2012	Fashion News Live	1 episode
2012	Adam Hills Tonight	1 episode
2012	The 54th Annual TV Week Logie Award	Co-host
2012	The Silic & Lee Show at the Logies: Red Carpet Special 2012	
2012	Hamish & Andy's Euro Gap Year	7 episodes
2012	Today	1 episode
2009–2012	Hamish & Andy's Caravan of Courage	4 episodes, 4 part series
2013	The Ryzza Mae Show	1 episode, uncredited
2013	Hamish & Andy's Gap Year Asia	6 episodes
2014	Hamish & Andy's Gap Year South America	6 episodes
2017–2018	True Story with Hamish & Andy	20 episodes
2019	Hamish and Andy's "Perfect" Holiday	3 episodes
2019	Hard Quiz	1 episode
2019–present	Lego Masters Australia	Host
2021–present	Lego Masters Bricksmas Specials	Host
2024	The Assembly	1 episode, guest
2026	Unskilled Adult	

=== Writer ===
Year	Title	Episode/s Written
2004	Hamish & Andy	6
2006	Real Stories	8
2005–2009	Rove Live	40
2011	Hamish & Andy's Gap Year	10
2012	Hamish & Andy's Euro Gap Year	7
2009–2012	Caravan of Courage	4
2013	Hamish & Andy's Gap Year Asia	6
2014	Hamish & Andy's Gap Year South America	6

Years	Title	Episodes
2006–2010; 2015–2017	Hamish & Andy (radio show)	2,420+
2018–present	Hamish & Andy (podcast)	232+
2006	How Other Dads Dad	19+

== E. J. Whitten Legends Game ==
In 2008 and 2009, Blake and working partner Lee played in the E. J. Whitten Legends Game. Lee played for Victoria, while Blake played for the All-Stars. Blake scored the winning goal for the All-Stars in 2008, and he kicked an additional two goals in 2009.

== Mr. New York State 2011 ==
As part of a stunt for the TV series Hamish and Andy's Gap Year, Andy entered Hamish into the Mr. New York State bodybuilding competition in the Heavyweight division. Due to a technicality in which Blake was the only contestant over 200 pounds (91 kg)—the minimum requirement for a Heavyweight contender—he was awarded the title of Mr. New York State 2011 in the Heavyweight division.

Year	Award	Category	Result
2011	Mr. New York State	Heavyweight division	Won

== Awards and nominations ==
In the 2024 King's Birthday Honours list, Blake was bestowed a Medal of the Order of Australia (OAM) "for service to the arts as an entertainer, and to the community".

Year	Award	Category	Result
2011	Logie Awards	Most Popular Presenter	Nominated
2012	Logie Awards	Most Popular Presenter	Nominated
2012	Logie Awards	Most Popular Personality on TV	Won
2013	Logie Awards	Most Popular TV Presenter	Won
2013	Logie Awards	Most Popular Personality on TV	Nominated
2014	Logie Awards	Most Popular Presenter	Nominated
2015	Logie Awards	Most Popular Personality on TV	Nominated
2022	Logie Awards	Bert Newton Award for Most Popular Presenter	Won
2022	Logie Awards	Most Popular Personality on TV	Won
2023	Logie Awards	Most Popular Personality on TV	Nominated
2023	Logie Awards	Bert Newton Award for Most Popular Presenter	Nominated
2025	Logie Awards	Gold Logie — Most Popular Personality on Australian Television	Nominated

== See also ==
- List of Caulfield Grammar School people
