= True Story with Hamish & Andy =

Australian television series

- Genre: Anthology; Comedy; Talk show
- Created by: Tim Bartley; Hamish Blake; Andy Lee; Ryan Shelton
- Written by: Hamish Blake; Andy Lee; Ryan Shelton
- Directed by: Wayne Hope; Sian Davies; Tim Bartley; Richard Franc
- Presented by: Hamish Blake; Andy Lee
- Narrated by: Rod Mullinar
- Country of origin: Australia
- Original language: English
- No. of seasons: 2
- No. of episodes: 20

Production
- Producers: Tim Bartley; Hamish Blake; Andy Lee; Ryan Shelton; Andrew Walker
- Running time: 30 mins
- Production company: Radio Karate

Original release
- Network: Nine Network
- Release: 5 June 2017 – 9 October 2018

Related
- Hamish and Andy's Gap Year

True Story with Hamish & Andy is an Australian television series starring radio and television hosts Hamish Blake and Andy Lee, that was first aired on 5 June 2017. This is their third series for the Nine Network.

In July 2017, the Nine Network renewed the series for a second season. Season 2 began airing on 7 August 2018.

The series was repeated in blocks of 2 episodes from 8 February 2022, following broadcasts of The Hundred with Andy Lee.

An American version was released on HBO in 2024 under the title It's Florida, Man and features the exact same concept as the Australian version.

== Synopsis ==
The series saw Hamish & Andy sit down with everyday Australians who recount hilarious true stories that happened to them, with the events in the stories being recreated by Australian actors in filmed in comedic dramatisations.

== Series overview ==
Season	Episodes	Originally released	
Season	Episodes	First released	Last released
1	10	5 June 2017	29 August 2017
2	10	7 August 2018	9 October 2018

== Episodes ==
=== Season 1 (2017) ===
No. overall	No. in season	Title	Directed by	Written by	Original release date	Aus. viewers (millions)
1	1	"Rachel's Anything Story"	Richard Franc & Wayne Hope	Andy Lee, Hamish Blake & Ryan Shelton	5 June 2017	1.420
Summary: Rachel’s story occurred while on a work trip to Hong Kong when Rachel’s husband Mark, her two-year-old son Ashton and five-year-old daughter Brooke flew over to visit. Rachel and her family are invited to dine with one of Rachel’s students: a high-ranking government official. When they arrive at the unexpectedly fancy restaurant, Rachel’s risk management skills are put to work like never before. Actors in recreation: Emily Taheny, James Saunders, Fiona Choi & Keith Brockett
2	2	"Stubby's 100M Sprint Story"	Richard Franc & Wayne Hope	Andy Lee, Hamish Blake & Ryan Shelton	12 June 2017	1.202
Summary: Stubby takes us back to when he was a 15-year-old lifesaver trying to win a medal at the State Champs. But while at the starting line in his speedos, his excitement over seeing the girl of his dreams means something unexpected pops up. Actors in recreation: Craig McLachlan, Harrison Baker, Nasia Delis, Will Weatheritt, David James, Fiona Macleod & Olivia Horne.
3	3	"Sammie's Fainting Story"	Richard Franc & Tim Bartley	Andy Lee, Hamish Blake & Ryan Shelton	19 June 2017	1.161
Summary: Sammie's true story occurs when she and her husband Matthew decide to embark on the IVF program in the hope of having a child, and how a delicate procedure and Matthew's debilitating fear of needles collide in disastrous consequences. Actors in recreation: Helen Dallimore, John Leary, Phil Lloyd, Shareena Clanton, Genevieve Morris, Luke McGregor, Steen Raskopoulos.
4	4	"Emidio's Scam Story"	Richard Franc	Andy Lee, Hamish Blake & Ryan Shelton	26 June 2017	1.110
Summary: Emidio's true story harks back to when he was a first-year primary school teacher hoping to influence the leaders of tomorrow. What he didn't expect was getting scammed by genius 10-year-old student, Damien, who was always a step ahead. Actors in recreation: Ryan Shelton, Madeleine West, Glenn Robbins, Julie Nihill, John Wood, Jade Knight.
5	5	"Jack's French Horn Story"	Wayne Hope	Andy Lee, Hamish Blake & Ryan Shelton	3 July 2017	0.978
Summary: Jack's true story begins with an opportunity to play French Horn in an acclaimed youth orchestra. But when Jack hangs his suit in a questionable spot and one of Australia's oldest concert halls starts flooding, he is the number one suspect. Actors in recreation: Joel Granger, Kitty Flanagan, Brian Nankervis, Ed Kavalee, Colin Lane, Louise Siversen, Oliver Clark & Simon Hall
6	6	"Tracy's Wine Story"	Richard Franc & Tim Bartley	Andy Lee, Hamish Blake & Ryan Shelton	1 August 2017	0.990
Summary: Tracy's true story takes us back to when she was the general manager of a 5-star hotel in Bali and a wealthy American couple arrive for their private wedding. But what is meant to be the most special day of their lives, turns out to be the most memorable for all the wrong reasons. And it’s Tracy who is left to clean up a very expensive mess. Actors in recreation: Kat Stewart, Sam Pang, David Roberts, Heidi Arena, John Batchelor, Dave Lawson & TJ Power
7	7	"Phil's Millionaire Story"	Richard Franc	Andy Lee, Hamish Blake & Ryan Shelton	8 August 2017	0.988
Summary: Phil's true Story occurs when he thought he'd taken a cushy job on a luxury resort in the Kimberleys. Instead, he finds himself on a run-down cattle station in the middle of nowhere, hosting two French millionaires on a holiday from hell Actors in recreation: Damien Garvey, Richard Davies, Mick Molloy, Gregory J. Fryer, Megan Lilly Wilding, Syd Brisbane, Diana Glenn & Christian Manon
8	8	"Dani's Romantic Weekend Story"	Richard Franc	Andy Lee, Hamish Blake & Ryan Shelton	15 August 2017	0.968
Summary: Dani's true story finds Dani reunited with her childhood crush, joining him on a romantic weekend in Margaret River. But in this shockingly personal tale, Dani explains in excruciating detail, why this date couldn't have gone any worse. Actors in recreation: Katie Robertson, Gyton Grantley & Jane Hall
9	9	"Sal's Big Fish Story"	Richard Franc & Wayne Hope	Andy Lee, Hamish Blake & Ryan Shelton	22 August 2017	0.837
Summary: Sal's story sees him catch the biggest fish of his life, a 30kg Spanish Mackerel. But after failing to heed the warnings from a mysterious fisherman, Sal eats the fish for dinner, giving the small local hospital a night to remember. Actors in recreation: Stephen Curry, Bob Franklin, Darren Gilshenan, Wayne Hope, Mandy McElhinney, Sally-Anne Upton & Dilruk Jayasinha
10	10	"Sam's Dare Story"	Richard Franc & Wayne Hope	Andy Lee, Hamish Blake & Ryan Shelton	29 August 2017	0.817
Summary: Sam tells a true story that really is one for the ages. When a series of escalating dares get dangerously out of hand, Sam is forced to accept a dare that he (and now Hamish & Andy and you) will never ever forget. Actors in recreation: Thomas Sainsbury, Billy Revell, Bridie Connell, Travis Jeffrey, Greg Larsen, Heather Bolton & Janet Kruse

=== Season 2 (2018) ===
No. overall	No. in season	Title	Directed by	Written by	Original release date	Aus. viewers (millions)
11	1	"Carol's Fake Illness Story"	Tim Bartley & Richard Franc	Andy Lee, Hamish Blake & Ryan Shelton	7 August 2018	0.830
Summary: Carol tells the story of how when she was 15, she was given an English assignment, however the night before the due date, she hadn’t even started and with reading not her strong suit, Carol decided that her only way out was to fake an illness and miss the next day of school. But once Carol is committed to something, there is no going back – even if what she has committed to is entirely fictitious. Actors in recreation: Erin Taylor, Jane Allsop, Essie Davis, Rob Sitch, Mark Mitchell, Stephen Hall, & Tamala Shelton
12	2	"Alan's Feline Story"	Tim Bartley & Richard Franc	Andy Lee, Hamish Blake & Ryan Shelton	14 August 2018	0.698
Summary: Alan tells the story of how one day he got a call from his mate, Graham, who explained he had a unique problem. A Persian purebred cat had arrived on a flight dead and the owners would be arriving the following day. Graham asked Alan if he could help find a replacement cat with his connections at the animal shelter, which Alan does. But it turns out that the owners were not expecting to collect a live cat: the original cat had died, and they had posted it home. Actors in recreation: Dave Lawson, David James, Anne Edmonds, Katrina Milosevic, Sam Pang & Georgia Love.
13	3	"Sarah's Hospitality Story"	Colin Cairnes & Richard Franc	Andy Lee, Hamish Blake & Ryan Shelton	21 August 2018	0.769
Summary: Sarah tells the story of how after completing a Hospitality course she needed some experience and trial positioned at a fancy restaurant, as she began work there she started to notice strange things happening – she would return to tables and find the guests missing, or moved to another table. She was convinced that either Jeff was messing with her or Jock was sabotaging her chances. But when Sarah realises what is really going on, the shame and confusion is so great she can only walk out of the restaurant, never to return. Actors in recreation: Lucy Honigman, John Leary, Ryan Shelton, Susie Youssef & Genevieve Morris.
14	4	"Stephen’s Meet The Parents Story"	Tim Bartley & Richard Franc	Andy Lee, Hamish Blake & Ryan Shelton	28 August 2018	0.713
Summary: Stephen retells the story of how he met his girlfriend Natasha’s father, Mr D. Natasha’s family lived on a farm that bordered a maximum-security prison and Mr D explained to Stephen what would happen if intruders were ever found on his property. One fateful evening when Natasha finally convinced Stephen and his best mate Scotty to sneak her out to go clubbing, they would become fully aware of Mr D’s security protocols and score a visit to the local hospital as a result. Actors in recreation: Harley Bonner, Debra Lawrance, Richard Davies, Pia Miranda, Andy McPhee, Georgia Flood & Brian Mannix.
15	5	"Phil's Groin Story"	Tim Bartley & Andy Lee	Andy Lee, Hamish Blake & Ryan Shelton	4 September 2018	0.839
Summary: Phil tells the story of how one day he was at a BBQ at his mates, Robbo’s place. He was keen to win the affection of single girl Shazza, Phil sat down to sink a few tinnies and build some Dutch courage. However, when a kid playing nearby threw a tennis ball Phil’s way, Robbo’s dog closely followed. And when the ball hit Phil in the groin, the dog continued unabated. In this moment, Phil’s chances with Shazza went south. What ensues involves gaffer tape, good ol’ fashioned Aussie ingenuity, a trip to the hospital, and Phil getting to know Robbo’s pet dog a little too well. Actors in recreation: Broden Kelly, TJ Power, Christie Whelan Browne, Jess Harris, Troy Kinne, Kevin Hofbauer & Zachary Ruane
16	6	"Scott's Crime Story"	Colin Cairnes & Richard Franc	Andy Lee, Hamish Blake & Ryan Shelton	11 September 2018	0.710
Summary: Scott tells the story when he working as a truck driver. One afternoon while at the garage with his mate, Dave, a car zoomed past and Scott and Dave heard a crash. Then two shady looking guys walked past in the opposite direction. Scott and Dave went and inspected the crashed car and realised it was stolen. While Dave called the police, Scott decided to follow the suspects in his own car. However, while Scott drove around looking for the crims he stopped, the same two guys jumped in his car and asked for a lift. Over the next two hours Scott unwittingly becomes an integral part of a car theft conspiracy, going deep undercover and convincing the police that he isn’t in fact a criminal mastermind. Actors in recreation: Nathan Lovejoy, Rob Carlton, Shareena Clanton, Kate Jenkinson, Thomas Ersatz & Billy Revell
17	7	"Lisa's Wake Up Story"	Colin Cairnes & Richard Franc	Andy Lee, Hamish Blake & Ryan Shelton	18 September 2018	0.769
Summary: Lisa tells the story of when she was 22 and one day her sister Caitlin set her up on a blind date with a guy called John. They dated and quickly fell in love. It seemed that John really was the man of her dreams, until one fateful morning after staying the night at John’s house when Lisa’s dream became a nightmare. At first she was confused when she awoke to a pain in her hand, but she was nothing less than horrified when she discovered what was actually attached to her hand. Actors in recreation: Jessica Tovey, Ian Meadows, Dave Thornton & Emily Taheny.
18	8	"Murray's Tree Lopping Story"	Colin Cairnes & Richard Franc	Andy Lee, Hamish Blake & Ryan Shelton	25 September 2018	0.658
Summary: Murray retells the story from his 20s where he’d found his calling – tree lopping. He placed an ad in the local paper, but it wasn’t an easy business to crack, however before he knew it he got a call from the local hospital asking for a quote on a huge job. What follows takes Murray deep into the secretive world of tree loppers where he discovers an expert axeman addicted to salt sachets, known as The Oracle, and a hospital where quoting the right price turns out to be the least of his worries. Actors in recreation: John Waters, Mitchell Brotz, Dan Wyllie, Denise Scott & Bruce Spence.
19	9	"Jeremy's Nerd Candy Story"	Tim Bartley & Richard Franc	Andy Lee, Hamish Blake & Ryan Shelton	2 October 2018	0.635
Summary: Jeremy tells the story of when he was in Year 8 in the early 1990s, his mum started dating a new man named Andy who worked at the Nerds candy factory, Andy would bring home dozens and dozens of packets for Jeremy. Over the coming months Jeremy would take his surplus of Nerds and build a syndicated network of sales agents at his local high school. Jeremy went from nerd to kingpin, rolling in cash. But when a drug bust goes down at school, all eyes turn to Jeremy and his network of candy dealers. Actors in recreation: Michala Banas, Toby Truslove, Santo Cilauro, Nicholas Bell, Kate McCartney, Finn Scicluna-O’Prey & Dilruk Jayasinha.
20	10	"Paul’s Jockey’s Story"	Tim Bartley & Andy Lee	Andy Lee, Hamish Blake & Ryan Shelton	9 October 2018	0.634
Summary: Paul tells the story of how grew up in the small country town of Dunedoo, where from a young age he developed a lifelong love of horse racing. With his best mate Malcolm, while both of them dreamed of one day becoming jockeys in the Melbourne Cup, Malcolm was the real jockey of the two and he went on to ride successfully in Sydney. Paul never forgot their dream though, and when Malcolm’s hopes of riding in the Cup were dashed by injury, Paul decided to take things into his own hands to turn that dream into a reality. What followed would create Melbourne Cup history and make Paul’s mother either very proud or entirely ashamed. Actors in recreation: Andy Ryan, Luke McGregor, Mandy McElhinney, Anthony “Lehmo” Lehmann & Dave Hughes

== Ratings ==
True Story with Hamish & Andy : AUS viewers per episode (thousands)

Season	Episode number									
Season	1	2	3	4	5	6	7	8	9	10
1	1420	1202	1161	1110	978	990	988	968	837	817
2	830	698	769	713	839	710	769	658	635	634

Source: Audience measurement performed by OzTam

== American adaptation ==
In February 2020, it was announced that the series will be adapted for American audiences by American network NBC; it is hosted by actors Ed Helms and Randall Park, and the series is executive produced by Tim Bartley, Hamish Blake, Andy Lee, Ryan Shelton, Helms, Mike Falbo and Nicolle Yaron, who will also serve as showrunner, and it is produced by Warner Horizon in association with Pacific Electric Picture Co. and Universal Television Alternative Studio. In May 2021, it was announced that the series would be moving to Peacock. In December 2021, it was announced that the series would be titled True Story with Ed and Randall and premiered on January 20, 2022.

== Home media ==
The first season was released on DVD on August 30, 2017. Some copies were scented with the duo’s “Andy by Hamish” fragrance. A selection of viral videos made to promote the series were included as extras on the release. The second season was not released on DVD, but has occasionally appeared on the Nine Network’s catch-up service 9Now.

In June 2022, both seasons appeared on local streaming service Stan alongside the duo’s next series, Hamish and Andy's “Perfect” Holiday.

== See also ==
- List of Australian television series
- List of programs broadcast by Nine Network
