= Caravan of Courage (TV series) =

Annual road trips by the Australian comedy duo Hamish & Andy

- Logo
- Created by: Hamish Blake; Andy Lee
- Original work: Rove

Films and television
- Television series: United States; Great Britain and Ireland

Caravan of Courage is an annual road trip, travelled by Australian comedians Hamish Blake and Andy Lee. There have been a total of four road trips, the latest two being both aired on their radio show and combined into a television special, and the first two broadcast as a segment on the talk show Rove.

== Format ==
Every Caravan of Courage takes two weeks to complete. It sees Hamish and Andy travel across numerous states or countries and meet people along the way and participate in numerous activities. The caravan is usually named; the American caravan was named Abravan Lincoln and the Great Britain and Ireland caravan was named Sir Vancealot. While visiting numerous tourist attractions, Hamish and Andy take unusual routes through the smaller towns, for example in 2009, skipping the inner states of the US.

== Overview ==
| Year | Edition | Network | Original airdate(s) | Viewers | Nightly rank | DVD release (Region 4) |
|---|---|---|---|---|---|---|
| 2007 | Caravan of Courage* | Network Ten | 7 October 2007; 14 October 2007 | 957,000; 0.968 | — #12 | —N/a |
| 2008 | Caravan of Courage: Who Dares Dar-Wins* | Network Ten | 2 November 2008; 9 November 2008 | 1,048,000; 0.968 | No. 8 #9 | —N/a |
| 2009 | American Caravan of Courage | Network Ten | 10 September 2009 | 1,307,000 | No. 2 | 26 August 2010 |
| 2010 | Caravan of Courage: Great Britain and Ireland | Network Ten | 17 June 2010 | 1,749,000 | No. 2 | 26 August 2010 |
| 2012 | Caravan of Courage: Australia v New Zealand | Nine Network | 11 November 2012; 18 November 2012 | 1,340,000; 1,220,000 | No. 1 #2 | 20 March 2013 |

- Aired as a segment of Rove rather than a stand-alone television special

== Editions ==
=== Caravan of Courage (2007) ===
In 2007, the caravan of courage was thought up by Hamish and Andy who used it on their radio program. The duo wanted to have "The Peoples Holiday". Over a two-week period, they travelled 4000 km from Melbourne to Queensland. They were met in Queensland by Rove McManus and his live talk show as production moved to Queensland for the episode whose feature was the caravan of courage.

- Day 1: Wednesday 3 October: Southern Cross, Western Australia
- Day 2: Thursday 4 October: Norseman, WA
- Day 3: Friday 5 October: Cocklebiddy, WA
- Day 6: Monday 8 October: Tailem Bend, South Australia
- Day 7: Tuesday 9 October: Donald, Victoria
- Day 8: Wednesday 10 October: Benalla, VIC
- Day 9: Thursday 11 October: Goulburn, New South Wales
- Day 10: Friday 12 October: Bulahdelah, NSW

=== Caravan of Courage: Who Dares Dar-Wins (2008) ===
In 2008, Hamish and Andy were taunted by emails claiming they did not travel far enough. After first rejecting the idea, they decided they would once again bring out the caravan and travel from Melbourne to Darwin in two weeks. They set out on 27 October 2008. The trip was named "Who Dares Dar-Wins", a parody title of the very popular Australian show Who Dares Wins.

- Day 1: Nhill, Victoria
- Day 2: Williamstown, South Australia
- Day 3: Hawker, South Australia
- Day 4: Roxby Downs, South Australia
- Day 5: Coober Pedy, South Australia
- Day 6: Yulara (Uluru), Northern Territory
- Day 7: Aileron, Northern Territory
- Day 8: Wycliffe Well, Northern Territory
- Day 9: Elliot, Northern Territory
- Day 10: Mataranka, Northern Territory
- Day 11: Pine Creek, Northern Territory
- Day 12: Jabiru, Kakadu national park, Northern Territory
- Day 13: Darwin, Northern Territory

=== American Caravan of Courage (2009) ===
American Caravan of Courage
- Genre: Road trip
- Dates: 24 August–4 September 2009
- Location: United States
- Attendance: 1,307,000 viewers
- Budget: +86,000k

Hamish & Andy's American Caravan of Courage was the third instalment in the Caravan of Courage franchise. The road trip was travelled by Australian comedy duo Hamish and Andy and their caravan called Abravan Lincoln. The two-week adventure was aired on their radio show and was made into a television special for the Australian Network Ten.

Hamish and Andy travelled 5,000 km from Miami to L.A. in their caravan Abravan Lincoln. The trip aired on Australian radio every weekday as part of their program The Hamish & Andy Show which streams across numerous radio stations across Australia. Parts of the trip were combined and aired as a special on Network Ten

Before Hamish and Andy left for their caravan of courage, the two of them 'Caraplaned' their trip. The title of the trip was "Yes We Van"; nominees were "We Come From A Van Down Under", "The United States of Ameri-Caravan" and "RV There Yet?"

Trip:

- Day 1 – Hamish and Andy arrive at their first stop in Miami, Florida as Hamish takes a driving licence test, they locate a voodoo doll store and Hamish and Andy hunt down crocodiles with a local man.
- Day 2 – On their second day Hamish and Andy take a college 'frat' welcoming ceremony, try to track down the mythological Skunk Ape and accidentally run over a historical tree which is important to the local people.
- Day 3 – The duo arrive in Alabama where Hamish goes swimming with mermaids and Andy is placed under arrest by the local sheriff Bubba and his side-kick Hamish and they find out how dirty dirt bike riding can be.
- Day 4 – On their fourth day they arrive in Mississippi, visit the town Laurel and attempt the local pastimes which are shooting, chewing tobacco and eating large slices of food. They find out what happens after you shout at ghosts.
- Day 5 – Remaining in the state of Mississippi, Hamish and Andy have a go at the local sport of anvil shooting, learn to sing the style of blues and provide a guided tour of the infamous Abravan Lincoln caravan.
- Day 6 & 7 – The duo arrive in Texas and Andy receives a broken nose in a game of gridiron from a sixteen-year-old high school football player. Hamish trains and becomes a cheerleader and they both start a pep rally.
- Day 8 – The team arrive in New Mexico at a local township known as alien central of America. They meet people who claim they have been abducted by extraterrestrials from other planets and they have a party with a group of cowboys.
- Day 9 – On their ninth day on their caravan of courage in New Mexico Andy starts a war against Hamis. They visit a shop that sells rocks and Hamish is very happy when he decides to purchase a miniature horse.
- Day 10 – The two arrive in Arizona and have a show low as 'Arizona Andy' challenges Hamish for making the caravan have a foul odour with his constant farting and burping. They gamble in a casino with a local.
- Day 11 – On their eleventh day in the United States, Hamish and Andy create an involvement in the mystical mountain magic and live their American dream by visiting the great oversized American supermarket.
- Day 12 – Hamish and Andy have finally made their way to Las Vegas where they gamble with the money raised from their the people's $1000 bet to be able to afford a 'real life' hoverboard from a website.
- Day 13 – On their final day of their American caravan of courage, Hamish and Andy party in the Big Apple, New York City, with a group of listeners from all over of Australia, with Hamish having too much to drink.

The television special was entitled Rove presents Hamish and Andy's American Caravan of Courage. It premiered on Thursday 10 September in the time slot of 7:30 pm on Network Ten. It showcased footage from the thirteen-day road trip, and was produced by Roving Enterprises and Radio Karate. It rated 1.307 million viewers.

=== Caravan of Courage: Great Britain and Ireland (2010) ===
Caravan of Courage: Great Britain and Ireland
- Genre: Road trip
- Dates: 31 May - 11 June 2010
- Locations: Scotland, Ireland, England, Wales
- Attendance: 1,749,000 viewers
- Budget: +35,000k

Hamish & Andy's Caravan of Courage: Great Britain and Ireland is the fourth instalment in the Caravan of Courage franchise. The two-week adventure was aired on their radio show from 31 May until 11 June. It was made into a television special for the Australian Network Ten and aired in New Zealand on TV3 on 26 August 2010.

The pair travelled across Wales, Scotland, England and Ireland. The trip aired on Australian radio every weekday as part of their program The Hamish & Andy Show, which streams across the Today Network radio stations across Australia. Parts of the trip were combined and aired as a special on Network Ten on 17 June 2010.

Before Hamish Blake and Andy Lee left for their caravan of courage, the two of them 'Caraplanned' their trip. They named their caravan 'Sir Vancealot' with runners-up including 'Sir Vanthony Hopkins' and 'Margaret Hatchback'. It was decided that Hamish would not drive and be the navigator after he ran down a tree.

Trip:

- Day 1 – On the first day of their trip, Hamish and Andy arrive in Cork, Ireland. They meet their caravan Sir Vancelot, Hamish learns how to play the Irish tin whistle, they kiss the ancient mystical Blarney Stone, they play 'road bowling', they go to a castle where Andy discovers that his great-great aunt was a maid there and Andy has a falcon land on his buttocks.
- Day 2 – Hamish and Andy go surfing on the Irish coast, discuss their first night in Sir Vancealot and sing their song about Roscrea. They arrive in Roscrea, Ireland where they enter the haunted Leap Castle and are told ghost stories about it. Hamish tries his hardest for his fart to be captured on a thermal imagery camera. They go surfing on the Irish coast and discuss their first night in Sir Vancealot and sing their song about Roscrea.
- Day 3 – On their third day, Hamish and Andy arrive at Belfast and hunt for leprechauns. They later take a tour of the Belfast murals.
- Day 4 – On day four, Hamish goes to a boxing club in Belfast and then off to Strauchur, Scotland where Andy throws Hamish's tin whistle in the ocean.
- Day 5 – Hamish and Andy arrive in Loch Ness and go hunting for the mythological Loch Ness Monster. The duo play a game of swamp soccer, Hamish learns how to play the bagpipes and they sing a song about the town of Loch Ness.
- Day 6 & 7 – Hamish and Andy travel towards the border of England.
- Day 8 – Hamish and Andy cross the border from Scotland to England and arrive in Ravenglass. They play the traditional games of caber toss, haggis hurling and Tattslobbo lobster fishing. They attend the Festival of Lying and speak to a physic gypsy before writing a song for Ravenglass.
- Day 9 – They arrive in Tarporley, England on day nine and make haggis, attempt Gypsy gambling and visit the infamous Clootie Well. Hamish finishes a fake school and the two sing their song for the town of Tarporley.
- Day 10 – On their tenth day, Hamish and Andy visit the medieval city of Warwick and are challenged to a jousting competition against the black knight. Andy discovers he has foot rot and Hamish and Andy meet their caravan neighbours.
- Day 11 – On their eleventh day, Hamish and Andy arrive in Llanwrytd Wells in the country of Wales. They play the local sport of bog snorkelling, Andy hides Hamish's bagpipes and they create a song about Llanwrytd Wells.
- Day 12 – On their final day of Caravan of Courage 4, Hamish and Andy visit Mersea Island, England, track down the Antiques Roadshow and ask someone to evaluate an apparent wooden snake from World War I. They make their way to London to present their live special.

The television special entitled Hamish and Andy's Caravan of Courage: Great Britain and Ireland premiered on Thursday 17 June 2010 in the time slot of 8:00pm following the successful reality show Masterchef Australia on Network Ten. It showed footage from the twelve-day road trip with commentary by Hamish and Andy in front of a studio audience. It was produced by Roving Enterprises in association with Radio Karate.

Ratings for the special were phenomenal, ranking 2nd for the night. Overall the special brought in a total of 1,749,000 viewers, only losing 80,000 viewers to lead in Masterchef Australia. However, when timeshifted the ratings were revealed to be 1,847,000 viewers.
