= Hamish and Andy's Gap Year =

Australian TV series (2011-2014)

- Presented by: Hamish Blake; Andy Lee
- Opening theme: "Gap Year Theme Song" by Hamish & Andy (2011) "Addicted" by Bliss n Eso (2012–2014)
- Country of origin: Australia
- Original language: English
- No. of seasons: 4
- No. of episodes: 29

Production
- Running time: Approximately 60 minutes (inc. commercials)

Original release
- Network: Nine Network
- Release: 28 July 2011 – 5 August 2014

Related
- True Story with Hamish & Andy

Hamish & Andy's Gap Year is a Logie Award–winning comedy series following Hamish Blake and Andy Lee, a pair of Australian comedians, on their trips to various international locations. The first season saw the duo visiting America for ten episodes and broadcast their show weekly from New York City. In its second season in 2012, the show was titled Hamish & Andy's Euro Gap Year, and seven episodes were broadcast from The Lord Stanley, a disused pub in East London, England. The third season, known as Hamish and Andy's Gap Year Asia in 2013, was broadcast from a bar in Bangkok, Thailand, called The Raintree. The fourth season was known as Hamish and Andy’s Gap Year South America.

The concept for the show was created when the Nine Network hired comedians Hamish Blake and Andy Lee for two series in two years. They came across the idea of "Gap Year" when they realised they never took a gap year after high school, so they would film their many adventures overseas, as it was ironic that they had just received a contract for TV.

The show featured the American band Moon Hooch for the first season as an in house band; during the show, they band were dubbed The Buskerteers.

== Segments ==
A number of regular segments appear throughout the series:

- Safari: Hamish and Andy show a film about where they last went outside of New York, using a "safari map" hidden underneath their desk to show the exact location. For these adventures, the boys dress in purpose-built safari costumes.
- Hamish VS. Andy: This involves various competitions between Hamish and Andy. The segment also features Ryan Shelton as a correspondent. From season 2 onwards, Ian Danter serves as the segment’s narrator, replacing an unnamed voiceover artist used in the first season.
- Ultimate Wingman: Hamish struggles to find Andy (single) a girlfriend, by acting as his wingman (much to the annoyance of Andy).
- Cultural Eating: Introduced in season 2, the segment involves one of the boys offering the other an unusual local delicacy. Although it only appeared twice in season 2, it became a regular (appearing in almost every episode) in seasons 3 and 4.
- Interviews (Season 1 only): Hamish and Andy interviewed various celebrities, either in the studio or in hotel rooms. This segment was removed from the DVD release because the people interviewed didn't want them included.
- R2-To-Do (Season 1 only): This robot featured on the show provides a list of goals for Hamish and Andy to achieve on their journey.
- 100-Second New York Lesson'd (Season 1 only): Taken by Ryan Shelton, where he would take the viewers on various highly exaggerated tours of different culture and places in New York, each timed to 100 seconds. Hamish and Andy would make cameo appearances in each of the segments.

== Series overview ==
To date, four seasons of Hamish & Andy's Gap Year have aired.

Season	Season title	Episodes	Base location	Originally released		DVD release date
Season	Season title	Episodes	Base location	First released	Last released	DVD release date
1	Gap Year	10	Brooklyn	28 July 2011	29 September 2011	17 November 2011
2	Euro Gap Year	7	London	14 June 2012	26 July 2012	23 August 2012
3	Gap Year Asia	6	Bangkok	8 July 2013	19 August 2013	28 August 2013
4	Gap Year South America	6	Buenos Aires	1 July 2014	5 August 2014	6 August 2014

== Seasons ==
=== Hamish & Andy's Gap Year (2011) ===
No.	Title	Air date (Australia)	Australia viewers (millions)
1	"Episode 1"	28 July 2011	1.456
Safari: Catfish Noodling competition in Oklahoma and sleeping in public in NYC. R2-To-Do: Introduction of to-do list. Interviews: Taylor Swift and Neil Patrick Harris in the plastics factory.
2	"Episode 2"	4 August 2011	1.069
Safari: Roller Derby in Arizona. Ultimate Wingman: Hamish attempts to paint Andy in a positive light for female passers-by. R2-To-Do: Attempt to acquire an NYPD three-wheeled "tough-mobile", and remind Hillary Clinton that she owes them a BBQ. Interviews: The boys use a "time machine" to interview James Franco in his hotel room. 100-Second New York Lessond: Food
3	"Episode 3"	11 August 2011	1.057
Safari: LARPing (live action role playing) in Washington and Street Golfing in NYC. R2-To-Do: The boys get a self-proclaimed "voice analyser" to see if Hillary owned them a BBQ. Hamish acquires an NYPD three-wheeled tough mobile and jumps over the sacred Andy bobblehead with the vehicle in the factory basement. Ultimate Baby Wingman: Hamish pretends to be Andy's baby son in a stroller to attract compassionate females. 100-Second New York Lessond: Nightlife.
4	"Episode 4"	18 August 2011	0.993
Safari: A 5-star dog hotel in Florida, and "New York Dreams", where Hamish & Andy fulfill dreams that have been sent in by viewers. R2-To-Do: The boys visit Hillary Clinton's hometown to remind her of the BBQ with an aeroplane and large banner. Cackling Jack protects the NYPD tough-mobile against two "thugs" sent by Hamish. Andy decides to enter Hamish into the New York State Bodybuilding Championships. 100-Second New York Lessond: Broadway
5	"Episode 5"	25 August 2011	0.895
R2-To-Do: Hamish wins the Heavyweight division of the New York State Bodybuilding Championships. Hamish vs Andy: The boys compete in "Bin Racing" in Central Park. They must hide inside wheelie bins and wheel 60m without being seen moving by the public. Safari: A Lowriders' Club gathering in El Paso, Texas. Ultimate Gameshow Wingman: Hamish constructs a fake Australian dating show to lure in prospective dates for Andy. 100-Second New York Lessond: Secrets
6	"Episode 6"	1 September 2011	0.847
Safari: A Wild West re-enactment for French tourists in California. R2-To-Do: "Operation Sausage Waft 2011" attempts to waft the smell of a BBQ in the direction of Hillary Clinton's residence. Interviews: As the time machine from episode 2 broke, the boys find a new way to interview Sarah Jessica Parker in her hotel room. Hamish vs Andy: "Mates Racing", where they have to invite the most number of strangers to lunch. 100-Second New York Lessond: Yellow Things.
7	"Episode 7"	8 September 2011	0.733
Safari: Demolition Derby in Washington and the Asylum Film Studio (a studio that rips off blockbuster films) in NYC. Hamish vs Andy: "Stranger Racing", where balloons are attached to strangers and, unbeknownst to them, they are racing to cross the road. R2-To-Do: Hamish visits the Magic Castle in Los Angeles and books an audition to become a member. Interviews: Susan Sarandon visits the plastics factory and competes against Hamish in a trivia contest. 100-Second New York Lessond: Street Gangs.
8	"Episode 8"	15 September 2011	0.822
Safari: Johnson Space Center in Houston, Texas and a meeting with private investigator Jay J. Armes in El Paso. R2-To-Do: The boys visit Kim Beazley at the Australian Embassy in Washington, D.C. to get him to pass on a BBQ message to Hillary Clinton. Hamish practices his magic tricks in NYC. Ultimate Magic Wingman: Hamish uses magic tricks to impress girls and introduce them to Andy. 100-Second New York Lessond: Shopping.
9	"Episode 9"	22 September 2011	0.850
Safari: Hamish enters the National Hollerin' Contest, and the boys go to a SWAT training course. R2-To-Do: Hillary Clinton’s message gets passed on and her reply hints at a possible BBQ with Kevin Rudd, and Hamish meets his magic trick mentor. Hamish vs. Andy: Subway Rodeo, in which the boys use various methods to feel the intensity of the New York City Subway without moving. Interviews: Coldplay in the plastics factory, who perform their song "Every Teardrop is A Waterfall" live.
10	"Episode 10"	29 September 2011	0.883
Safari: The boys play basketball with Allan Houston at the West Fourth Street Courts. They also show a tourism ad made out of their "safari" adventures. R2-To-Do: Hamish auditions for the Magic Castle and gets his membership, and the boys have one last ride in the NYPD three-wheeled tough mobile and reminisce on what they did throughout their "gap year". Hamish vs. Andy: Sleep Racing, where the boys "race" against each other to see which one falls asleep first, with the help of a university professor. Ultimate "Last Ditch" Wingman: Hamish puts up a billboard at One Times Square advertising Andy. 100-Second New York Lessond: Art.

==== Hamish & Andy's Gap Year USA – "Best Of" Edition (2015) ====
A new version of Hamish & Andy's Gap Year was released to Stan in 2015 alongside all other Gap Year series, Caravan of Courage specials, Learn India with Hamish & Andy and Hamish & Andy's Reministmas Special. This version is based on the interview-free DVD, but rearranged and with a few segments (mostly 100-Second New York Lesson'd segments) deleted. This is also the version available on the Hamish & Andy TV YouTube channel, rather than the original.

No.	Title	Safari	100 Second New York Lesson'd	Hillary Clinton BBQ Update	Hamish vs. Andy
1	"Part 1"	#1 – Bare-Hand Fishing #2 – Roller Derby	Food	-	-
Special announcement: Hamish thinks about excluding himself from this version Other segments include: DVD Intro; Audience’s "Reaction" to Week 1; R2-To-Do - 3-Wheeled Tough Mobile + Timeslot Tattoo; Ultimate Wingman; Street Golf With Tiger Hood (preceded by "Week Three" title card from the DVD); R2-To-Do - Hillary Clinton Owes Us BBQ
2	"Part 2"	#3 – LARPing	Nightlife	Voice Analyzer	-
Special announcement: Andy points out that all the "dumb bits", such as a clip of Hamish eating a massive burger are still included in this version Other segments include: Making Your NY Dreams Come True, Ultimate Baby Wingman, 3-Wheeled Tough Mobile Update
3	"Part 3"	#4 – Chateau Poochie #5 – Lowriders	Broadway	Jack in Hillary’s Hometown	Bin Lid Racing
Special announcement: Hamish mentions a Brad Pitt appearance, which according to Andy didn’t happen. Other segments include: Jack The Butcher Watches The 3-Wheeled Tough Mobile; Hamish Enters Mr. NY State Bodybuilding Comp; Fun With Glitter Cannons
4	"Part 4"	#6 – Western Reenactment Town #7 – Combine Harvester Demolition Derby	-	-	Mates Racing
Special announcement: Hamish mentions that they almost put the interviews in, but were worried about celebrity party invitations Other segments include: Ultimate Gameshow Wingman; Asylum Productions – Home Of The Mockbuster; R2-To-Do - The Magic Castle
5	"Part 5"	#8 – Private Investigator Jay J. Armes #9 – Hollerin	-	Kim Beazley Visit	Stranger Racing
Special announcement: Hamish mentions that, unlike the celebrities, the regular guest stars get what they deserve Other segments include: NASA; Magical Johnston presents Street Magic; Ultimate Magic Wingman
6	"Part 6"	-	Art	Ruddy To The Rescue	Subway Rodeo; Sleep Racing
Special announcement: Hamish claims that they removed the interviews cause the celebrities said "you can’t on-sell them." Other segments include: Free Plastic Giveaway; Streetball in The Cage with Allan Houston; Magic Castle – Hamish Meets His Mentor, Doug; Magic Castle – The Audition; One Last Drive In The 3 Wheeled Tough Mobile; Ultimate Last Ditch Wingman

=== Hamish & Andy's Euro Gap Year (2012) ===
Euro Gap Year title card

The shows were broadcast from the disused Lord Stanley pub in East London (Sandringham Road, Dalston E8).

This season was also the only one broadcast in the UK on ITV4. Euro Gap Year and Gap Year Asia were rebroadcast in Australia throughout December 2020, due to Hamish and Andy not working on a new TV program that year.

No.	Title	Air date (Australia)	Australia viewers (millions)	Ranking on night
1	"Episode One"	14 June 2012	1.413	#1
Hamish and Andy travel to Mostar, Bosnia, to jump off the 21-metre tall Old Bridge. They also buy a rabbit which they name "Lenny Rabbitz", and compete in "Rabbit Jumping", a self- explanatory sport from Sweden. Translation Racing: Players must ask random people on the streets of Rome questions (in Italian), fed to them through an earpiece. Most understood phrases wins.
2	"Episode Two"	21 June 2012	1.365	#2
The boys travel to Lapland (northern Scandinavia), to compete in reindeer racing. They also head out in London to be paparazzi for a day with a professional paparazzi called Jack. Later they crack open their homebrewed beer, Gap Byear, too early, and the beer hadn't even begun to ferment, due to "the freezing cold London summer" as Hamish puts it. Hitchhike Racing: Players must hitch-hike as far as they can across Europe in 24 hours, starting in Frankfurt, Germany. They cannot pay or bribe potential lift-givers, though they can each send one "Hinder" to their opponent, to lower their chance of hitch-hiking.
3	"Episode Three"	28 June 2012	1.411	#2
Hamish and Andy go to Venice, where they pilot Gondolas for a day, Hamish also reveals he his one eighth Italian, and acts as if Venice is his hometown, despite occasionally speaking Spanish to their Gondolier instructor. They head to the Netherlands to see which one is the better butler, by going to the International Butler Academy. Kiss Racing: Each player has one hour to get as many points for kissing random people on Parisian streets. One point is awarded for each kiss, and another point for each second the kiss is held.
4	"Episode Four"	5 July 2012	1.183	#4
The boys go to Bavaria to compete in "Finger Pulling", a sport in which string is tied to each player's middle finger and they try to pull the other player's hand over a center line. Hamish pulls the short straw and must compete, and is unnerved after meeting a man who lost his finger in a game of finger pulling. In Russia, they go to a fighter pilot training centre and where they are taught how to eject, and not to f****ng touch anything once inside the plane, but before that they must go to a preparation sauna with other trainees. Ultimate Wingman returns, and they spend a day fulfilling other people's London dreams which are sent in and drawn from a pillowcase.
5	"Episode Five"	12 July 2012	1.090	#5
Hamish and Andy go to Catalonia to be part of Los Torres Humanas, but Hamish finds out there is a snail festival happening at the same time and joins that instead and he competes in a biscuit eating contest, which he wins, and spends most of the day drinking. In Paris they go into the catacombs where Andy tries to leave Hamish behind. They also try to ride a stage of the Tour de France with Australian cyclist Cadel Evans, but he was "too busy", so instead they decide to go from Gibraltar to Morocco on an aqua trike. Life size "Guess Who?": The same as regular Guess Who?, but with 12 sets of twins.
6	"Episode Six"	19 July 2012	1.156	#3
In Germany, they compete in "Bus Pulling" where teams of men pull a roadcoach over 30 metres, with some teams managing to do it in around 20 seconds. In Sicily, they try to sell more fish than each other in an hour. The boys head to France, where Hamish has the goal of buying a rollersuit, but after a disastrous trial run, Andy forbids Hamish from buying one. They also go to Gibraltar and set off on their aqua bike to Morocco, fueled by a Red Bull rip-off made by Hamish the night before, which was water with "every performance-enhancing vitamin in the store", Hamish also keeps a "captain's log" during the voyage. Shop Hiding: Players must go into a shop and ask for something from the storeroom of the shop, and while the employee is getting the item, the player must hide somewhere in the shop. The player who hides for the longest wins.
7	"Episode Seven: Pre Opening Ceremony Special"	26 July 2012	1.118	#3
Australian Olympic athletes are the audience in the Lord Stanley for the filming of the episode. The boys go to Russia and act in Russian "cat theatre", a circus-type event involving cats. During the episode's filming, a torch, which was a model galah lit on fire (a flaming galah), was run from a Walkabout pub in London to light the Lord Stanley's fireplace. They head to Prague for some synchronized swimming, and run "vigorous psychological tests" on Australia's best Olympians.

=== Hamish & Andy's Gap Year Asia (2013) ===
The shows were broadcast from a bar in Bangkok, Thailand, called 'The Raintree'.

No.	Title	Timeslot	Air date (Australia)	Overnight viewers (Rank) Consolidated viewers (Rank) Total viewers	Source
1	"Episode One"	Monday 8 pm	8 July 2013	1,566,000 (#1); 160,000 (#1); 1,726,000	
2	"Episode Two"	Monday 8 pm	15 July 2013	1,490,000 (#1); 154,000 (#1); 1,644,000	
3	"Episode Three"	Monday 8 pm	22 July 2013	1,455,000 (#1); 93,000 (#1); 1,548,000	
4	"Episode Four"	Monday 7 pm	5 August 2013	1,191,000 (#4); 110,000 (#4); 1,301,000	
5	"Episode Five"	Monday 7 pm	12 August 2013	1,228,000 (#4); 132,000 (#2); 1,360,000	
6	"Episode Six"	Monday 7 pm	19 August 2013	1,299,000 (#3); 108,000 (#2); 1,407,000	

=== Hamish & Andy's Gap Year South America (2014) ===
The shows were broadcast from Buenos Aires, Argentina. They also decided to include all of Latin America, rather than just South America, so they could go to Mexico and Central America.

No.	Title	Timeslot	Air date (Australia)	Overnight viewers (Rank) Consolidated viewers (Rank) Total viewers	Source
1	"Episode One"	7:30pm Tuesday	1 July 2014	983,000 (#7); 127,000 (#5); 1,110,000	
Hamish and Andy begin in Mexico and go to a town in which they partake in wearing paper-mache bull hats, which are loaded with fireworks. They go to Nicaragua and decide to fulfill two dreams: Climbing an active volcano, and cooking a lasagna on an active volcano. Hamish convinces Andy to see a Shaman to fix his sore shoulder, and in Cultural Eating, Andy gets Hamish to eat teredo worms. Stranger Soccer/Football: Players are given a small soccer ball/football, and must drop the ball onto a stranger's foot or shin before the target person crosses a line about 20–30 metres from a mini goal, if a goal is "kicked" after the target crosses the line, the ball is deemed offside and is not a goal. People walking by the goal can defend or save the ball with no consequence, but they cannot help the ball along once it has been kicked.
2	"Episode Two"	7:30pm Tuesday	8 July 2014	967,000 (#6); 87,000 (#4); 1,054,000	
The boys once again begin in Mexico with a simulation border crossing. Neither of them 'make it'. Then they travel to Colombia to meet some tribesmen who specialize in blow darting, resulting in a game of blow darts, which Hamish and his partner win 24–22. By losing, Andy had to dress up in a monkey suit whilst villagers blew darts at him. Finally, in Cultural Eating, Andy had to eat an eye from a Bolivian "specialty" dish, called 'roast face'. Brazilian Wax Racing: Players must get strangers to wax their skin as many times as possible within 1 hour. After 45 minutes players are allowed to have their 'nether-regions' waxed, with backsides worth 2 points and the front 3.
3	"Episode Three"	7:30pm Tuesday	15 July 2014	1,014,000 (#6); 123,000 (#4); 1,137,000	
Corporate Fat-Cat Racing
4	"Episode Four"	7:30pm Tuesday	22 July 2014	1,047,000 (#6); 102,000 (#5); 1,149,000	
5	"Episode Five"	8:40pm Tuesday	29 July 2014	987,000 (#9); 216,000 (#1); 1,203,000	
Monkey Run: Players have 100 bananas strapped to them, and must shuffle across an obstacle course with their feet chained together and try to have less monkeys take away bananas than the other player. There is a banana attached to the player's groin which is a 30-point penalty if it is taken. The Player with the most bananas left is the winner.
6	"Episode Six"	8:40pm Tuesday	5 August 2014	1,000,000 (#8); 201,000 (#2); 1,201,000	
Photo Stalling: Players must offer to take a photo for a group of tourists in Rio, Brazil, but then stall as long as they can before taking the picture. If anybody in the group moves from their pose, the player loses. The second round challenged players to get the tourists to stand in as many different poses as possible before the tourists ask for their camera back.

== Ratings ==
Hamish & Andy’s Gap Year : AUS viewers per episode (millions)

Season	Episode number									
Season	1	2	3	4	5	6	7	8	9	10
1	1.456	1.069	1.057	0.993	0.895	0.847	0.733	0.822	0.850	0.883
2	1.413	1.365	1.411	1.183	1.090	1.156	1.118	–		
3	1.726	1.644	1.548	1.301	1.360	1.407	–			
4	1.110	1.054	1.137	1.149	1.203	1.201	–			

== Awards and nominations ==
Hamish & Andy have won 5 Logie Awards from 16 nominations for their work on Hamish & Andy's Gap Year.

Year	Nominee	Award	Result
2012	Hamish Blake	Most Popular Presenter	Nominated
2012	Hamish Blake	Gold Logie: Most Popular Personality on Australian TV	Won
2012	Hamish & Andy's Gap Year	Most Popular Light Entertainment Program	Won
2013	Hamish Blake	Most Popular Presenter	Won
2013	Hamish Blake	Gold Logie: Most Popular Personality on Australian TV	Nominated
2013	Andy Lee	Most Popular Presenter	Nominated
2013	Andy Lee	Gold Logie: Most Popular Personality on Australian TV	Nominated
2013	Hamish & Andy's Euro Gap Year	Most Popular Light Entertainment Program	Nominated
2014
2014	Andy Lee	Most Popular Presenter	Nominated
2014	Andy Lee	Gold Logie: Most Popular Personality on Australian TV	Nominated
2014	Hamish Blake	Most Popular Presenter	Nominated
2014	Hamish & Andy's Gap Year Asia	Most Popular Light Entertainment Program	Won
2015	Hamish Blake	Gold Logie: Most Popular Personality on Australian TV	Nominated
2015	Andy Lee	Gold Logie: Most Popular Personality on Australian TV	Nominated
2015	Andy Lee	Most Popular Presenter	Nominated
2015	Hamish & Andy's Gap Year South America	Most Popular Entertainment Program	Won
