= Andy Lee (comedian) =

Australian comedian (born 1981)

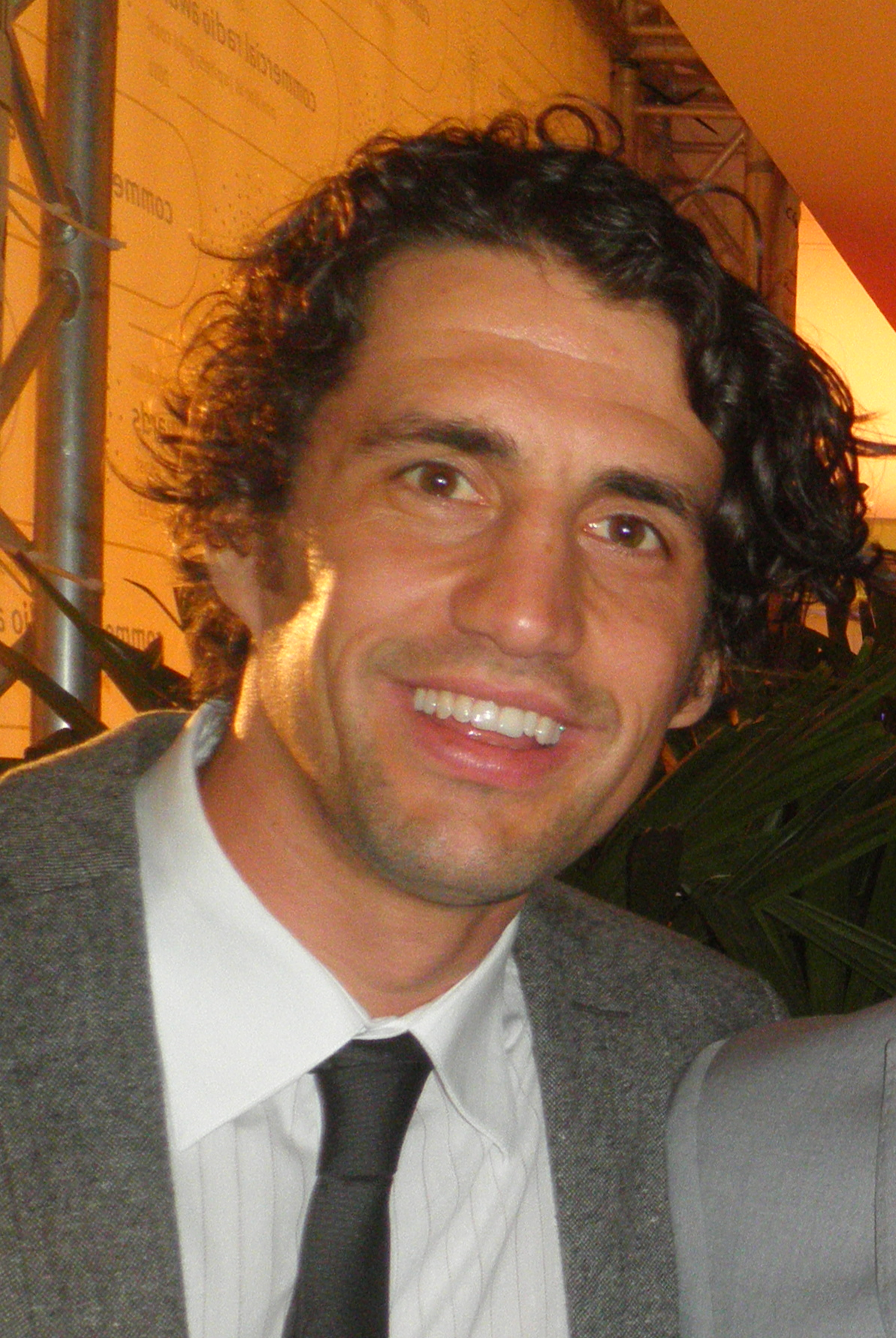
- Lee in 2011
- Born: Andrew Thomas Lee; 24 May 1981 (age 45); Melbourne, Victoria, Australia
- Education: Camberwell Grammar School; University of Melbourne
- Spouse: Rebecca Harding (m. 2026)

Comedy career
- Years active: 2003–present
- Medium: Radio, television
- Genre: Comedy
- Website: www.hamishandandy.com

Andrew Thomas Lee (born 24 May 1981) is an Australian comedian, television presenter, musician and children's writer. He is known for working alongside Hamish Blake as part of the comedy duo Hamish & Andy.

== Early life ==
Andrew Thomas Lee was born on 24 May 1981 in Melbourne, the middle child of Michael and Margaret Lee. He has a younger sister, Alex Miles, who writes pantomimes and stars in the comedy stage show Porky Pies. He also has an older brother, Cameron, with whom Lee started the band Zoophyte.

Lee attended Balwyn Primary School and Camberwell Grammar School. He was a member of the Scouting Movement, performing in Camberwell Showtime and the Melbourne Gang Show. He studied commerce at the University of Melbourne, where he met comedic partner Hamish Blake in 2001.

== Career ==
=== Hamish & Andy ===
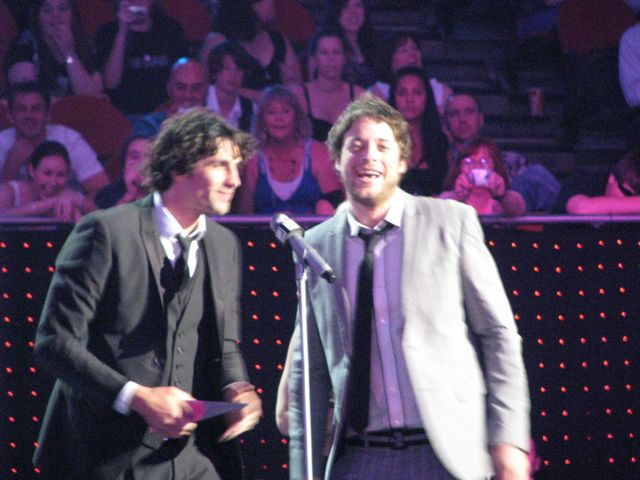
Lee (left) and Blake (right) at the 2009 ARIA Awards

Lee and Blake teamed with Ryan Shelton and several others to create a show called Radio Karate for RMIT University's student television company RMITV, broadcast on community-access television station Channel 31. They also trained with, and appeared on, RMIT's student radio station SYN, and they subsequently had a few spot projects on FOX FM.

Lee and Blake then hosted a televised comedy programme on Australia's Seven Network, The Hamish and Andy Show, which was shortly cancelled after bad ratings. Critics acknowledged their talent but panned the show as poorly executed. Since this show, Lee and Blake have almost always performed together. They are now consistently referred to as Hamish & Andy. Another early TV project the duo took part in creating was the mockumentary TV show Real Stories (not to be confused with True Story, a later series by the pair).

Blake and Lee hosted the national (Hit Network) drive-time radio program Hamish & Andy that ran between 4 pm and 6 pm, Monday to Friday. In 2011, the program was cut back to a weekly Friday show due to the duo wanting to pursue other opportunities. The radio show was considered to be immensely successful, scoring top positions in the radio ratings in the crucial Sydney and Melbourne markets (as well as Perth). Their audience share was around 20%, which is the highest ever recorded for a national FM show in Australia.

Lee won the first series of Joker Poker, a celebrity poker show in which contestants win money for charity. He appeared on the Network Ten program Australia's Brainiest Comedian.

He was selected as one of the entrants to the Who's Who in Australia 2011 edition.

On 10 May 2010, Andy and Hamish appeared on the TV show Good News Week.

In 2011, the duo made a deal with Channel Nine, creating a ten-part series called Gap Year: New York. In 2012, the comedy duo created a second Gap Year season, titled Hamish and Andy's: Euro Gap Year, in which the two travelled throughout Europe leading up to the 2012 London Olympic Games. In 2013, they continued the Gap Year series, creating a third season titled Hamish & Andy's Gap Year Asia. In 2014, they completed their fourth and final gap year in South America, aptly titled Hamish & Andy's Gap Year South America. In 2019 the duo created Hamish & Andy's “Perfect” Holiday a spiritual successor to the Gap Year series airing on Channel 9. Other projects the pair have worked on include a weekly podcast (as opposed to when they worked on the radio) on the PodcastOne network as well as the aforementioned TV series True Story.

=== Solo work ===
Lee released an educational times table CD in 2003, The Sing Along Times Table CD Book. The CD was rediscovered in 2005/2006 after an "alert listener" informed Blake, causing him to tease Lee about it on their radio show.

Lee was a founding member of Melbourne band Zoophyte, along with his brother Cameron. In 2007, Lee had retired from the band due to other commitments, but he occasionally appeared as a guest at gigs.

In 2015, Lee formed Coolboys and the Frontman with comedic partner Hamish Blake and producer Jack Post.

In 2016, Lee surprised his nephew George for his first birthday by authoring what was supposed to be a one-off single-copy children's book called Do Not Open This Book, featuring illustrations by Heath McKenzie. However, the book became very successful, leading to widespread publication and an award-winning series over the next several years. As of 2021, there are 30 items in the Do Not series, including several books.

Ahead of the 2020 AFL season, Seven Network's The Front Bar announced that Lee would join original hosts Andy Maher, Mick Molloy and Sam Pang as a regular cast member.

In early 2021, he was the host and executive producer of the Australian version of the game show The Cube on Network 10. He has hosted The Hundred with Andy Lee on the Nine Network since 2021.

During the 2021–22 Ashes series, Lee served as a commentator on Triple M's coverage.

In March 2025, Lee opened an Australian-themed pub in New York called Old Mates. The pub is co-owned by various notable Australians, including longtime collaborator Hamish Blake, along with Hugh Jackman, Patty Mills, Pat Cummins, and Ash Barty.

On 4 July 2025, Lee's series Do Not Watch This Show, based on his book series called Do Not Open This Book, went to air on ABC.

== Personal life ==
Lee is a supporter of the Carlton Football Club and has worked for the club in off-field roles with Carlton members. He was named Cleo magazine's Bachelor of the Year in 2006.

Lee was in a relationship with model and actress Megan Gale from 2006 to 2010; they split amicably and remained friends. In January 2015, it was announced that Lee was dating model Rebecca Harding. The pair briefly separated in July 2016, but they reconciled a few months later. While rumours have flown the couple have been engaged since 2021, Lee confirmed on the 2 May 2024 episode of the Hamish & Andy podcast that he had proposed to her the previous Sunday. The couple were married on 13 October 2026 in Manhattan, New York City.

== Awards and nominations ==
Year	Award	Category	Result	Ref
2006	Cleo Bachelor of the Year	Cleo Bachelor of the Year	Won	
2013	Logie Awards	Most Popular Personality on TV	Nominated	

Preceded by Ryan Phelan	Cleo Bachelor of the Year; 2006	Succeeded by Jason Dundas
