= Jonah Takalua =

- Summer Heights High, Jonah from Tonga character
- First appearance: Episode 1 (Summer Heights High)
- Last appearance: Episode 6 (Jonah from Tonga)
- Created by: Chris Lilley
- Portrayed by: Chris Lilley

In-universe information
- Gender: Male
- Occupation: Student (Year 9)
- Family: Rocky Takalua (father); Teresa Takalua (deceased); Mary (sister); Moses (younger brother); Three unnamed siblings Grace (aunty)
- Relatives: Mamafu (uncle); Aisi (cousin); Melody (cousin)

Jonah Takalua is a fictional character in the Australian mockumentary series Summer Heights High, and the titular character in the six-part Jonah from Tonga. He is portrayed in brownface by Chris Lilley, who also created the two shows. In 2007, referring to the character's appearances in Summer Heights High, Sydney Morning Herald television critic Michael Idato wrote that "Jonah Takalua is well on the way to becoming the voice of his generation."

== Concept and creation ==
In writing Summer Heights High, Lilley decided to base the series around three key characters (all portrayed by him) through whom he could examine three different experiences of high school, that of the schoolboy (Jonah), that of the schoolgirl (Ja'mie King) and that of the teacher (Mr G). He created Jonah to explore the world of the male student, with the character's delinquent, disruptive personality arising from Lilley's desire to play a character very different from himself and the person he had been at high school. In order to develop the character's voice and mannerisms, he met and interviewed Pacific Islander children and "just naughty teenage boys", studying their behaviour and speech patterns. "Chris goes out and meets people his characters are like and he makes studies of them, takes notes or interviews people and sometimes films them. He watches those videos over and over and over," says Ryan Shelton, who collaborated with Lilley on his first series, We Can Be Heroes: Finding The Australian of the Year.

As a white man in his late thirties, Lilley knew he could not easily pass for a Tongan teenager, and so deliberately surrounded Jonah with other Pacific Islander boys in order to make him more believable. "I knew that physically I didn't really look like a Tongan kid but if you surrounded him enough with the other kids and got the hair right, maybe people would get the illusion." He found playing Jonah more challenging than his other two roles, Mr. G and Ja'mie, but also considers him "the most rewarding to watch, perhaps because he is the most different to me".

== Character profile ==
=== Family ===
Jonah originates from Tonga, having immigrated to Australia when he was 3 years old. He is the second youngest of five children and was raised by his father, Rocky Takalua (his mother died when he was 6 years old). He lives in Summer Heights with his father, his sister, two cousins and an aunt. He shares a room with his three brothers.

=== Education ===
Jonah has attended three schools over the past 18 months. He was expelled from the two previous schools he attended for setting fire to a student's locker and defacing the Principal's car by spray-painting a penis on it. He was also expelled in year 8 for threatening violence and other inappropriate behavior towards his English teacher.

Jonah has serious academic struggles. He attends a remedial reading course at "Gumnut Cottage" with teacher Jan Palmer, the only teacher he apparently likes.

In the final episode of the Summer Heights High, Jonah is revealed to have been expelled, and is stated to be returning to his native Tonga to live with his uncle. On the final day of term, Jonah performs his story in front of the Gumnut Cottage audience, revealing a sensitive and heartfelt statement which epitomises the difficulty faced by the character, due to the racial and cultural barriers satirised within the program. In the final scene of the series, Jonah's graffiti tag - '*DICK*tation' - is seen scrawled throughout the school as a final mark of his defiance.

=== Hobbies and interests ===
Jonah "lives for breakdancing" and wants to do it professionally when he gets older. Jonah claims he is one of the best breakdancers in the school, while his friend Leon Pulami claims Jonah is the best breaker in the suburb. Despite their claims, the breakdancing ability of Jonah and his friends appears to be at a beginner level. Jonah and his friends have created a breakdancing crew called the "Poly Force", the only fully Polynesian B-boy Crew in the school. Jonah and his friends spend the majority of their free time breakdancing in the school's amphitheatre, which adds tension to a rivalry Jonah has with a year 7 breakdancer called Keiran McKenna.

Jonah and his friends Ofa, Joseph, Leon and Thomas enjoy punking fellow students and teachers. With help from his friends, Jonah planned and acted in a prank where he was run over by a teacher driving a car. Previously, Jonah threw a year 7 student's bag over the train line; when confronted he claimed that he was only punking him.

Jonah has also shown interest in modern graffiti. He and his friends have vandalised various walls and objects on school premises, particularly the boys' toilets. Evidence that he is the culprit is often left via his personal tag, a drawing of a penis followed by "tation", making it a play on the word "dictation".

As part of a remedial reading program held at the special needs class 'Gumnut Cottage', Jonah has also expressed an interest in conquering his illiteracy, stating the future possibility of him reading "Harry Potter like in a day". Despite disliking other teachers and subjects in general at Summer Heights High, he shows genuine interest in the reading program and an affinity with its teacher.

== Reception ==
=== Jonah from Tonga ===
Six-part series Jonah from Tonga aired in 2014 in Australia (ABC), New Zealand (Comedy Central), UK (BBC Three), and on HBO in several parts of the global HBO network.

The series was called "racist", and "dreadful" and spawned an online protest movement by young Tongans concerned at how Lilley's inaccurate portrayal might affect their communities and futures. Several major U.S. civil rights organizations wrote to HBO expressing their "deep concern" over the show. These included the NAACP, National Hispanic Media Coalition, American Indians in Film/TV, Empowering Pacific Islander Communities, and The Asian Pacific American Media Coalition.

Prachi Gupta wrote in Salon: "While this show is a greater disservice to Tongans in Australia, this type of caricature is just as harmful in America, where our only mainstream knowledge about the Polynesian culture now consists of Lilley’s character. It’s disappointing that HBO, a network that is often considered the gold standard of television (and one that is trying to improve its record on diversity), will air "Jonah From Tonga" tonight. It's a step back for this community, as the only thing worse than not being represented on the screen is being represented by a person who thinks he can speak for you."

The series was a ratings "disaster" for ABC and BBC.

=== Summer Heights High ===
Lilley's portrayal of Jonah in Summer Heights High was broadly well received by critics, with many praising the 33-year-old's ability to embody the teenaged character so convincingly. Claire Zulkey of The A.V. Club described it as "a testament to both Lilley's and [the younger cast members'] acting ability that it doesn't seem totally strange that an actor in his mid-30s is playing someone who pals around with 13-year-olds", and commended Lilley's attention to detail in developing Jonah's various mannerisms, such as "the mumbled verbal diarrhea, the sprawling limbs [and] the physical affection with his boys." Catherine Deveny of The Age described Lilley's performance as "perfect", while Karla Peterson of The San Diego Union-Tribune praised him as bringing to the role a "cherry-bomb energy and an outsider's empathy that makes Jonah such an aggravating charmer".

The character of Jonah also received praise, with several critics identifying him as the emotional heart of the series. His struggles with racism, an unstable home life, and a school unable to understand his needs form the most heartbreaking aspect of the series, said Dean Flannery of CBC News. "Jonah is funny," Flannery wrote, "but his situation is not." Professor Stephen Dinham of the Australian Council for Educational Research said that Jonah was a recognisable figure who exemplified a particular group of students who struggle in school, failing in literacy and falling behind their peer group while trying to cover up their difficulties with bravado and disruptive behaviour. Other teachers agree: "We've all known Jonahs", one Melbourne high school teacher told The Age. She pointed to the confrontation between Jonah and Miss Wheatley in Episode 7, in which the English teacher becomes near-hysterical in trying to silence a misbehaving Jonah, as a scene with which many teachers would be familiar.

Dinham says that Jonah's experiences present a good illustration of the mistakes schools make when in comes to disadvantaged students. He argues that the "Polynesian Pathways" program in which Jonah is made to participate as a way of embracing his Tongan heritage suffers from the same problems that many such programs experience in schools across Australia. "What he really needed to do was deeply engage with Polynesian culture, which is a very rich one, and through that be challenged and really get some depth out of it," said Dinham. Unfortunately, a lack of time, resources and skills generally render these programs "shallow" and "tokenistic".

Not all reviewers took such a positive view of the character, however. Dave Shiflett of Bloomberg found him the "most annoying" of Lilley's three characters, although he added that his sympathy for Jonah increased as the series progressed. NJ.com's Alan Seppinwall considered him a "one joke" character. Some critics were unimpressed by a storyline in Episode 4 in which Jonah falsely tells his teachers that his father has been molesting him, only confessing his lie when his father threatens to confiscate his PlayStation. Dr Helen McGrath, a senior lecturer in psychology and education at Deakin University and a counselling psychologist, said that Lilley had "gone too far". "This would distress enormously people to whom this kind of thing (child sexual abuse) has happened," she said.

In September 2007, the Herald Sun raised concerns about the impact of the show on students, with parents and teachers reporting that children were adopting Jonah's habit of referring to others as "homos" and telling adults to "puck off". Victorian Principals Association president Fred Ackerman criticised the show as promoting poor standards of behaviour. Child psychologist Michael Carr-Gregg said that although he considered the show "brilliant", there was a danger that young children—and even older people—would fail to grasp the show's satire, and that for such people Jonah's behaviour could be seen to be "mocking effeminate men and homosexuals as well as reinforcing racial stereotypes". However, youth researcher Professor Johanna Wyn dismissed these concerns, arguing that young people are now much more sophisticated in the way in which they consume media and would not see the show as a model for behaviour. Education Union branch president Mary Bluett agreed, saying that the show was "clearly tongue-in-cheek" and was not a matter for concern.
