= List of Summer Heights High characters =

This page is a list of characters in the Australian television series Summer Heights High.

== Main characters ==
=== Ja'mie King ===
Ja'mie King (pronounced "Ja-may") is a 16-year-old, Year 11 schoolgirl. Ja'mie featured in Lilley's previous series, We Can Be Heroes: Finding The Australian of the Year, where she attended Hillford Grammar, a private girls' school in Sydney. Ja'mie had in the past sponsored 85 Sudanese children as part of a Global Vision program, however her motives were not due to concern for the children's welfare; Ja'mie saw it as a way of gaining approval and fame, as well as a chance to legitimately go on crash diets in the form of the 40 Hour Famine fundraising event every week.

In the new series, Ja'mie is on an exchange program to Summer Heights High, a government school. She swaps schools with another student from Summer Heights, Chantelle Kwong, who will be going to Ja'mie's school, Hillford. The aim of the program is to show students from public and private schools that the schools each other attend are no different from each other, and a good education can be received from both. However, upon arriving at Summer Heights, Ja'mie assumes that the school would be full of "bogans", "sluts", and the facilities would be "crap".

Ja'mie immediately makes friends with the most popular girls in Summer Heights High. It becomes obvious however, that her friendship is not genuine when her so-called friends discover a poster she has made of them calling them "povo skanks". Her manipulative character is enforced when she manages to convince her new friends that the poster was meant as a joke and that they need to "get a sense of humour". Ja'mie exhibited a racist attitude toward Asian people, as well as general snobbishness. She made several attempts to alienate Bec from their group of friends, as she is of Singaporean descent. She also harassed Holly about having unusually large breasts, Jess for having skin problems, and Kaitlyn for being dumb and doing restricted maths.

During the show, Ja'mie falls in love with Year 7 student Sebastian, and decides to go out with him. However, the relationship only lasts a short amount of time as Ja'mie steals Sebastian's mobile phone and finds out a girl named Madeline has been texting him to sit with him in English class. Ja'mie dumps him and claims he made her "question my hotness".

Later on in the show, Ja'mie and her friends form a student representative council, and decide to organise a Year 11 formal. Ja'mie plans to have it at a popular nightclub with an expensive DJ, however at $450 a ticket, the student council faces canceling the event because students can't afford tickets. Instead, Ja'mie arranges a day to raise money for AIDS in Africa, which is enough to cover formal expenses. The Head of Senior School learns that the reason for this fundraiser isn't to raise funds as intended, but to fund the expensive formal.

As a compromise, Ja'mie is offered to hold the formal in the school's staff room, with no DJ and cheap, hand-made decorations. She invites Tamsin to the formal, a lesbian student, as she wants to make a big impression, but when Tamsin finds out that Ja'mie is not lesbian, she ditches her by SMS, forcing Ja'mie to instead take Sebastian, who she gets back together with just for the night. The Ja'mie segment ends with her leaving the school after her term at Summer Heights High in the car with her mum and friend Brianna. At the very end, she stands up through the car's sun-roof and shouts, "Public schools rock!"

=== Mr. G ===
Helen "Greg" Gregson, aka Mr G is a 36-year-old drama teacher at the school. Mr G not only believes that he is an incredibly talented and well liked teacher, but also that his students share his intense passion for drama and performance. His narcissism places him in constant conflict with other members of staff, and the school principal in particular. His self-centred attitude extends to frequently losing his temper with the students, and he is hostile to the disabled students being involved in his musical as he is under the belief that they will damage its quality. It is clear that he is unaware that his own perception of his teaching abilities is not shared by most students. He has written several musicals for the school, including "Mate, You Can't Skate", based on the Avril Lavigne hit single Sk8er Boi; and "Tsunamarama", based on the events of the 2004 tsunami disaster, set to the music of Bananarama. Mr G has previously been featured on the Seven Network sketch series Big Bite.

=== Jonah Takalua ===
Jonah Takalua is a 13-year-old school boy with a Tongan accent, who is in Year 8 at Summer Heights High - his third school after being expelled from two others for acts of vandalism. He causes trouble at the school by treating his teachers with disrespect and bullying younger students. His most hated teacher appears to be Ms. Wheatley, his English teacher. There is constant conflict between the two characters and as a result he is at serious risk of being expelled.

Jonah also has difficulties learning, and attends "Gumnut Cottage", a remedial English class for students at Summer Heights High who have reading difficulties. After threatening Ms. Wheatley, Jonah is expelled from Summer Heights High. He is seen to be very calm and relaxed on the last day of term, not wanting to "punk" (i.e. prank) any other students as though his character has changed and become more mature. However, in the closing scene his graffiti tag *dick*tation appears at numerous locations around the school, and this is seen as his final revenge.

=== Secondary Cast ===
Summer Heights High Staff

- David Lennie as Doug Peterson, social officer.
- Kristy Barnes-Cullen as Sarah Wheatley, English teacher.
- Elida Brereton as Margaret Murray, school principal.
- Stanley Roach as Rodney Parsons, science teacher and assistant to Mr. G.
- Caren Ruck as Meredith Cotton, Head of Drama.
- Maude Davey as Jan Palmer, remedial reading teacher who runs Gumnut Cottage.
- Scott Louder as Paul Cameron, Head of Senior School.

Summer Heights High Students

- Kelly Dingeldei as Candice, a dancer and singer playing Jessica in Mr. G's musical. She is also the female voice on the "Naughty Girl" CD, released March 2008.
- Coby Ramsden as Annabel, Mr G bases his production on her after she dies from an ecstasy overdose.
- Asolima Tauati as Leon, Jonah's best friend.
- Iro Utaifeau as Joseph, Jonah's friend.
- Zach Fa'atoe as Thomas, Jonah's friend.
- Ofa Palu as Ofa the salofa, the female in Jonah's group.
- Danny Alsabbagh as Toby, one of Mr. G's Special Education students.
- Jessica Featherby as Holly, Ja'mie's 'emo' friend.
- Kristie Coade as Jess, Ja'mie's 'skanky' friend.
- Alicia Banit as Kaitlyn, Ja'mie's 'dumb' friend.
- Nicole Joy Tan as Bec, Ja'mie's 'Asian' friend.
- Sally Kingsford as Ashley, the 'fugly' girl.
- Ashley Mclerie as Keiran, Jonah's breakdancing nemesis.
- Jansen Perrone as Sebastian, Ja'mie's romantic interest.
- David Venn as Matthew, the former star of Mr. G's musical.
- Brigid Gallacher as Tamsin Walker, the school lesbian and Ja'mie's initial date for the formal.
- Maria as school student Julie, seen in Mr G’s Drama class scene
- Ruberia as school student julie’s Best friend, Martha also seen in Mr G’s drama class scene

Parents

- Tovia Matiasi as Rocky Takalua, Jonahs father.
- Jhyll Teplin as Jhyll King, Ja'mie's South-African born mother.
