= Chris Lilley (comedian) =

Australian comedian (born 1974)

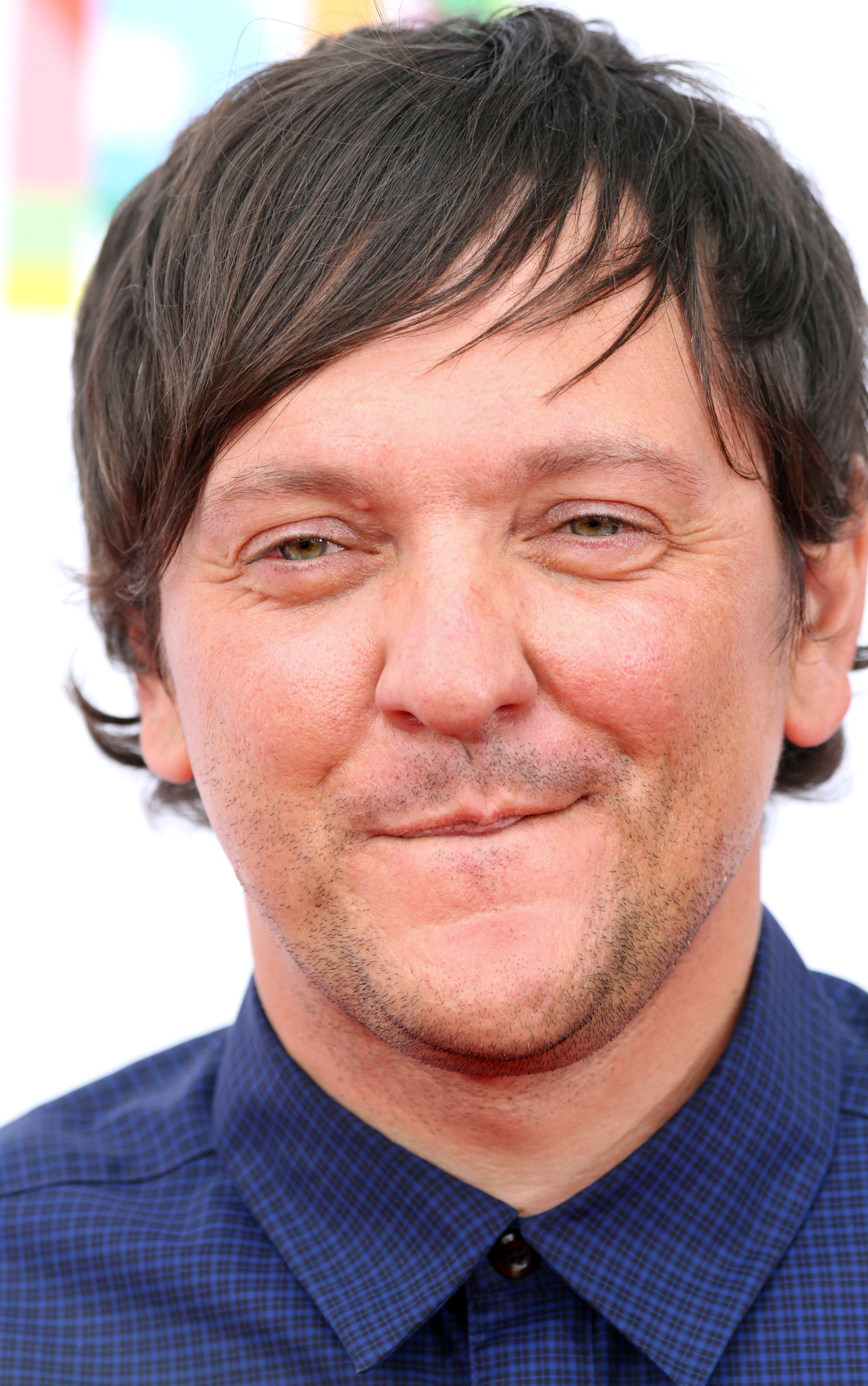
- Lilley at the 2014 ARIA Music Awards in Sydney
- Born: Christopher Daniel Lilley; 10 November 1974 (age 52); Turramurra, New South Wales, Australia
- Education: Barker College; Macquarie University

Comedy career
- Years active: 2003–present
- Medium: Television; music; podcast
- Genres: Mockumentary; sitcom; character comedy

Christopher Daniel Lilley (born 10 November 1974) is an Australian comedian, actor, writer, and musician. He is known for his creation and portrayal of several characters in the mockumentary television series We Can Be Heroes: Finding The Australian of the Year (2005), Summer Heights High (2007), Angry Boys (2011), Ja'mie: Private School Girl (2013), Jonah from Tonga (2014), and Lunatics (2019). He is a two-time winner of the Logie Award for Most Popular Actor.

== Career ==
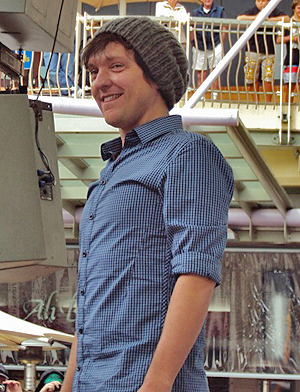
Lilley in 2009

He began his career in his twenties as a stand-up comedian while also working as a childcare worker at Turramurra North Public School and a shop assistant. In 2003, Lilley made his debut in Big Bite, a Seven Network comedy programme, in which he portrayed extreme sports enthusiast Extreme Darren and the high-school drama teacher Mr G, a character that he continued in Summer Heights High. Big Bite was nominated for Best Television Comedy Series at the 2003 Australian Film Institute Awards. It did not win. The producers co-credited Lilley; however, the show lasted only one series before being spun off into a comedy/variety programme. Lilley was a recurring guest on the programme, but it was cancelled after only a few episodes.

Lilley appeared in the film satire Ned, based on the Australian outlaw Ned Kelly. He appeared as the MSN Butterfly in a series of television advertisements and Cinema for MSN. He has also appeared on the Hamish & Andy radio show.

In 2015, Lilley was the main actor for The Stafford Brothers, Rick Ross and Jay Sean's When You Feel This music video.

=== We Can Be Heroes ===
After the cancellation of Big Bite, Lilley created We Can Be Heroes: Finding The Australian of the Year, a six-part series on the ABC, in which he portrayed various characters nominated for the Australian of the Year Award. The series was co-written with Ryan Shelton.

Lilley portrayed several characters in the series: Phil Olivetti, a self-obsessed police officer; Ricky Wong, a Chinese Australian university physics student from Melbourne; Pat Mullins, a 47-year-old housewife with a dream to roll on her side from Perth, Western Australia to Uluru, Northern Territory; Daniel Sims, a teenage boy who donates an eardrum to his deaf twin brother, Nathan (both Daniel and Nathan later appeared in Angry Boys); and Ja'mie King, a narcissistic girl attending a private high school in Sydney (Ja'mie later appeared in Summer Heights High and Ja'mie: Private School Girl).

Lilley was nominated for Best Comedy Series and Best Lead Actor in Television at the 2006 Australian Film Institute Awards, and won the Best New Talent and Most Outstanding Comedy Program awards at the Logie Awards of 2006. He also received a Rose d'Or award in Switzerland for Best Male Comedy Performance. Following the series' success, it was sold to other countries under the new name The Nominees.

=== Summer Heights High ===
Lilley's second mockumentary series, Summer Heights High, aired on ABC TV in 2007.

In the series, Lilley played the series' three main characters at a public school: Ja'mie King, Mr G and Jonah Takalua. In March 2008, Lilley released a single, Naughty Girl, based on the series, and performed in character as drama teacher Mr G.

At the 2008 Logie Awards he was nominated for four awards including Most Outstanding Actor and Gold Logie for Most Popular Personality on Television, and won the Silver Logie for Most Popular Actor and the Logie Award for Most Outstanding Comedy Program.

The series was sold to the United States, Canada, and the United Kingdom. Lilley embarked on a promotional tour of the United States in October 2008 to promote the U.S. broadcast of the series, which began airing on HBO on 9 November 2008. The BBC began showing the programme on BBC Three in June 2008.

When asked whether there would be a second series, Lilley stated, "I never thought about it in the beginning because it was always a one-off thing. I'm not into just cashing in and rolling off into a second series that is not as good. I really enjoyed making the show, so the thought of writing and going back there again is really fun and exciting, but I haven't made a decision on what to do next."

=== Angry Boys ===
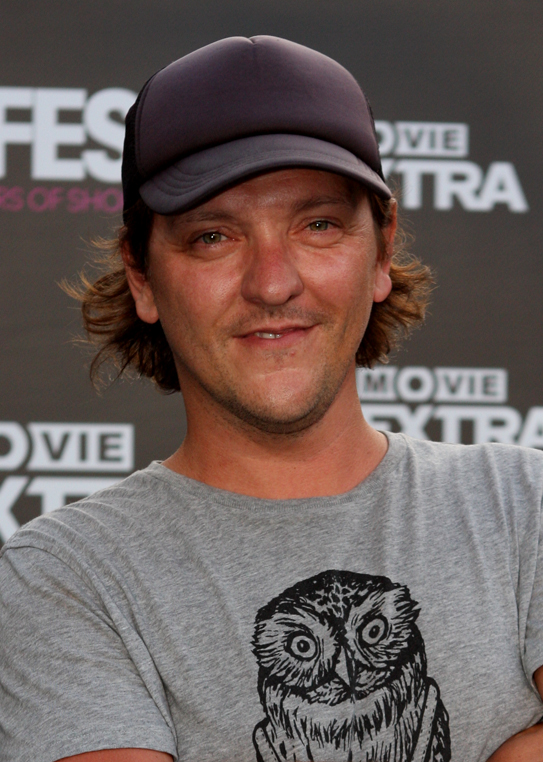
Lilley in 2012

Angry Boys, Lilley's third mockumentary series, aired on ABC in Australia and BBC in the UK in 2011, and HBO in the US in 2012. The 12-part comedy series features six vastly different new characters played by Lilley. The show introduces S.mouse!, a US rapper; Jen Okazaki, manipulative Japanese mother; Blake Oakfield, a champion surfer; Ruth "Gran" Sims, a guard at a juvenile detention facility; and her grandchildren, South Australian twins Daniel and Nathan Sims (who also featured in We Can Be Heroes: Finding the Australian of the Year).

Lilley won the inaugural AACTA Award in 2012 for Best Comedy Performance in Television for Angry Boys.

=== Ja'mie: Private School Girl ===
Ja'mie: Private School Girl, which aired in 2013, is a six-part half-hour comedy series. It was produced by Melbourne-based production company Princess Pictures and Chris Lilley, and was a co-production between the ABC in Australia and HBO in the US. It was pre-sold to BBC Three in the UK.

On 8 September 2013, Lilley revealed that the returning character to the series was Ja'mie King, from We Can Be Heroes and Summer Heights High; he also revealed the title of the show.

Lilley won the 2014 Silver Logie for Most Popular Actor for his performance in Ja'mie: Private School Girl.

=== Jonah from Tonga ===
On 26 November 2013, Lilley confirmed that he would be reviving Jonah Takalua for a new show in 2014, titled Jonah From Tonga. Jonah had been introduced in Lilley's 2007 series Summer Heights High. At the conclusion of that series, Jonah was expelled from Summer Heights High School. In the new series, his father, Rocky Takalua, has sent him back to his homeland of Tonga to live with his uncle and their family in order to get Jonah's life back on track.

The six-part series was produced by Princess Pictures and Chris Lilley in conjunction with the Australian Broadcasting Corporation. The show was originally posted online on the ABC iView service, available for viewing by Australian residents, and on BBC iPlayer in the United Kingdom, from 2–4 May 2014, before airing on ABC1 from 7 May 2014 and BBC Three from 8 May 2014. In New Zealand Māori Television screened the first episode on 29 July 2017, but then withdrew later episodes.

=== Lunatics ===
In March 2018, it was announced that Lilley had been signed by Netflix to create a 10-part series, with the titular character not yet disclosed. Filming began at the Bond University campus on the Gold Coast, Queensland.

On 10 April 2019, a trailer surfaced online showing a number of new characters. The show is called Lunatics and features a group of eccentric characters with different talents or oddities. Alongside the series order announcement, it was confirmed that Lilley would star in the lead role. Lunatics was released on 19 April 2019 exclusively on Netflix.

Lunatics features six different characters, all played by Lilley, which include fashion retailer Keith Dick; estate agent Quentin Cook; 7-foot college student Becky Douglas; 12-year-old Gavin McGregor, who is an heir to an earldom; ex-pornstar Joyce Jeffries; and South African Jana Melhoopen-Jonks, a celebrity pet psychic who is also a lesbian.

Lilley collaborated with The Jonas Brothers and Paris Hilton with his Lunatics characters Keith Dick and Jana Melhoopen-Jonks.

== Personal life ==
Lilley has been a vegetarian since the age of five.

He dated Milly Gattegno, one half of the Australian DJ duo The Faders_{,} from 2014 to 2016.

== Controversies ==
Lilley's series Summer Heights High gained significant controversy, criticism and media scrutiny for its portrayal of such issues as mental disabilities, homosexuality, sexual abuse, and racism. Even before the series aired, some community groups complained about a rape joke and Mr G's inappropriate touching of a boy with Down syndrome. The Herald Sun reported that parents and some teachers have considered the possibility that the show is influencing children to misbehave at school. Students were reportedly imitating Jonah and Ja'mie, repeating lines that were bullying, racist, and homophobic. Education Union branch president Mary Bluett stated in response that the show was "clearly tongue-in-cheek". After episode three, in which a character called Annabel dies after taking ecstasy, the family of Annabel Catt, a 20-year-old woman who died taking drugs at the 2007 Good Vibrations Festival in Sydney, complained that the program had been lampooning Annabel's death. ABC apologised to the family, stating that the situation was purely coincidental and assured them that the filming of the episode in question had been completed eleven days before her daughter's death. ABC thereafter began to display a message before each episode stating that there is no link between the series' characters and people in real life.

On 29 July 2017, Lilley was the subject of criticism after posting a remix on his Instagram account of a music clip entitled Squashed Nigga, starring the character S.mouse from Lilley's 2011 TV show, Angry Boys. The music video featured an Indigenous boy lying on the ground with his arms splayed. On 24 July 2017, the court case based on the death of Elijah Doughty had ended in controversy and was the subject of pro-Aboriginal protests. Just like the real case, Lilley's music video described an Aboriginal boy being run over and killed. It was reported that many who criticised Lilley's inopportune timing were blocked from his Twitter account, with Lilley later deleting his social media accounts.

Lilley's series Jonah from Tonga was called racist and resulted in protests from academics and Tongan youth concerned at the inaccurate and demeaning portrayals of Tongan culture. The show received criticism for Lilley's imitation of a non-White person, which was dubbed by certain media commentators as brownface, an act they have compared to blackface minstrel shows of the 19th century and early 20th century. The creators of the 2004 ABC TV documentary series Our Boys stated that Lilley drew inspiration for the Jonah character from their work. The subject of Our Boys recalled being "absolutely embarrassed, full of hate, angry and exploited" after viewing Summer Heights High, saying "I knew from that episode Jonah was me". The series' director, as well as a teacher at Canterbury Boys High School also felt that the character exploited the Tongan students who Lilley had met while visiting the school after seeing Our Boys on television in 2004.

Major US civil rights organizations wrote to HBO expressing their "deep concern" over Jonah From Tonga. These included the NAACP, National Hispanic Media Coalition, American Indians in Film/TV, Empowering Pacific Islander Communities and The Asian Pacific American Media Coalition (which itself includes the Asian American Justice Center, Asian Pacific American Advocates, Japanese American Citizens League, Media Action Network for Asian Americans, National Federation of Filipino American Associations, and more).

In 2019, Lilley was again accused of blackface by journalists for his Lunatics character Jana Melhoopen-Jonks, a South African woman. This accusation was later acknowledged to have been unfounded, as the character is White.

Following the 2020 Black Lives Matter protests, BBC iPlayer removed Jonah from Tonga from its online streaming service. On 11 June 2020, Netflix confirmed it had removed four of Lilley's series from its streaming service, also in response to the Black Lives Matter protests and movement. In the weeks following these events, Lilley posted multiple videos of content involving the Jonah character to his YouTube channel.

== Filmography ==
Year	Title	Role	Notes
2001	The Monday Dump	Army Reserve Guy	1 episode
2002	Young Lions	Mick Dwyer	1 episode: "Grand Prix"
2003	Ned	Customer 1 / Klansman	Film
2003–2004	Big Bite	Various	Also co-writer
2004	Hamish & Andy	Various	Also co-writer
2005	We Can Be Heroes: Finding the Australian of the Year	Various	Also writer
2007	Summer Heights High	Ja'mie King / Mr G / Jonah Takalua	Also writer and composer
2009	The Spearman Experiment	Himself	1 episode
2011	Angry Boys	Various	Also writer, director, producer, and composer
2013	Ja'mie: Private School Girl	Ja'mie King	Also writer, director, producer, and composer
2014	Jonah from Tonga	Jonah Takalua	Also writer, director, producer, and composer
2015	Stop Laughing...This Is Serious	Himself	Guest; 1 episode
2019	Lunatics	Various	Netflix original series; also writer, director, producer, and composer

== Discography ==
=== Albums ===
List of compilation albums, with selected details
Title	Album details	Peak chart positions
Title	Album details	AUS
Summer Heights High	Released: 2007; Label: ABC Records; Format: CD	—
Angry Boys	Released: 2012; Label: ABC Records; Format: CD	75
Chris Lilley Theme Songs	Released: October 2014; Label: Chris Lilley; Format: Digital; Compilation	—
Lunatics	Released: July 2019; Label: Chris Lilley; Format: Digital	—

=== Singles ===
List of singles, with selected chart positions
Title	Year	Peak chart positions
Title	Year	AUS
"Naughty Girl" (as Mr G)	2007	7
"Slap My Elbow" (as S.mouse)	2011	37
"Squashed Nigga" (as S.mouse/Shwayne Jnr.)	2012	70
"Learning to Be Me" (as Ja'mie King)	2013	—
"Don't Be a Bully" (as Jonah)	2014	—

== Podcasts ==
- Ja'miezing (2021) (as Ja'mie King)
- Jana's Yard (2020) (as Jana Melhoopen-Jonks)
- Mr G's Room (2025) (as Mr. G)

== Awards and nominations ==
=== ARIA Music Awards ===
The ARIA Music Awards are a set of annual ceremonies presented by Australian Recording Industry Association (ARIA), which recognise excellence, innovation, and achievement across all genres of the music of Australia. They commenced in 1987.

Year	Nominee / work	Award	Result	Ref.
2008	Summer Heights High soundtrack	Best Original Soundtrack, Cast or Show Album	Won	
2011	Angry Boys – Official Soundtrack Album	Best Original Soundtrack, Cast or Show Album	Won	
2014	"Learning to Be Me" (as Ja'mie)	Best Comedy Release	Nominated	
2019	Lunatics	Best Comedy Release	Nominated	

Awards
Logie Awards
Preceded by No previous award in this category	Graham Kennedy Award for Most Outstanding New Talent; 2006 for We Can Be Heroes	Succeeded by Tammy Clarkson for The Circuit
Preceded by The Chaser for The Chaser Decides	Most Outstanding Comedy Program; 2006 for We Can Be Heroes (with Laura Waters)	Succeeded by Working Dog Productions for Thank God You're Here
Preceded by Aaron Jeffery for McLeod's Daughters	Most Popular Actor; 2008 for Summer Heights High	Succeeded by Todd Lasance for Home and Away
Preceded by Working Dog Productions for Thank God You're Here	Most Outstanding Comedy Program; 2008 for Summer Heights High (with Laura Waters)	Succeeded by Working Dog Productions for The Hollowmen
Preceded by Steve Peacocke for Home and Away	Most Popular Actor; 2014 for Ja'mie: Private School Girl	Succeeded by Steve Peacocke; Home and Away
Rose d'Or
Preceded by David Walliams with Matt Lucas for Little Britain	Best Male Comedy Performance; 2006 for We Can Be Heroes	Succeeded by Tiger Aspect Productions for The Vicar of Dibley
