= Danny Alsabbagh =

Australian actor

Danny Alsabbagh is an Australian actor who played Toby Alsabbagh in the 2007 Australian Broadcasting Corporation TV series Summer Heights High. He later appeared in the music video "Naughty Girl".

Alsabbagh, who has Down syndrome, is part of the City Council's 'Be Yourself' program, a support program for young people with mild to moderate disabilities. He was the joint City of Hobsons Bay Young Citizen of the Year in 2008.

Alsabbagh attended Yarraville SDS.

He is mentioned in the book Neurodiversity: Discovering the Extraordinary Gifts of Autism, ADHD, Dyslexia, and Other Brain Differences for being able to act and for finding "a special niche as an artist." Alsabbagh also secured an internship with Red Stitch Actors Theatre, where he focuses on painting and set building.
