= Ja'mie King =

- 'We Can Be Heroes, Summer Heights High, Ja'mie: Private School Girl' character
- First appearance: We Can Be Heroes (2005)
- Last appearance: Ja'mie: Private School Girl (2013)
- Created by: Chris Lilley
- Portrayed by: Chris Lilley

In-universe information
- Full name: Jamie Louise King
- Gender: Female
- Occupation: Student
- Family: Marcus King (father); Jhyll King (mother); Courtney Eliza King (sister)

Jamie Louise "Ja'mie" King (/dʒəˈmeɪ/ jə-MAY) is a fictional character portrayed by actor Chris Lilley in the Australian comedy series We Can Be Heroes: Finding the Australian of the Year (2005), Summer Heights High (2007), Ja'mie: Private School Girl (2013), and the podcast series Ja'miezing (2021). Ja'mie was born in South Africa but lives in Kirribilli in the upper class North Shore region of Sydney, New South Wales.

Ja'mie is a student in Year 11 at Hillford Girls' Grammar School—a fictional private school on Sydney's affluent North Shore—who is highly driven, charismatic, and accomplished but also narcissistic, neurotic, manipulative, and callous. In addition, she frequently exhibits a racist attitude towards Asian people. The character was developed by Lilley with the assistance of comedian Ryan Shelton. Lilley developed the character's mannerisms by using recorded interviews with private schoolgirls and also eavesdropping. Lilley stated that he did not want teenage girls to watch it and think "that's such an older guy's view of teenagers".

== Appearances ==
=== We Can Be Heroes ===
King was first introduced in We Can Be Heroes as a 16-year-old student in Sydney who attends Hillford Girls' Grammar and is one of several nominees for the Australian of the Year Award. Ja'mie has sponsored 85 Sudanese children for Global Vision (a fictional organisation parodying World Vision International), which gave her the National Record. Despite her self-proclaimed altruism, her motives are not due to concern for the children's welfare; Ja'mie is shown as seeing it as a way of gaining approval and fame, as well as a chance to legitimately go on crash diets in the form of the 40 Hour Famine fundraising event every week.

Due to her work of raising money, Global Vision decided to make her the "face" of their organisation. King is then featured in a school assembly to promote the work of Global Vision where she scolds the school for misusing their money telling them that each dollar they do not donate equals one dead child, and that they should convert their school oval into a "mass grave" because of the money the school accumulated from food sales at the canteen. Two weeks before the Australian of the Year finals, Ja'mie is informed that a flood has hit "her" village, killing all but two of her sponsored children.

Sonali, one of the surviving Sudanese children Ja'mie has sponsored, eventually enters Australia illegally (being held at the Villawood Immigration Detention Centre) and writes a letter to Ja'mie asking to visit her. Ja'mie is sceptical at first but soon realises that this visit will bring her a lot of media attention, so she invites one of her friends along because she "is good at taking photos". The series ends with Ja'mie taking Sonali along to Canberra for the finals and lends Sonali her Year 10 formal dress to wear for the occasion.

=== Summer Heights High ===
King is re-introduced in the show Summer Heights High where she is on an exchange program to a state school called Summer Heights High. She swaps schools with another student from Summer Heights, Chantelle Kwong, who will be going to Ja'mie's school, Hillford. The aim of the program is to show students from public and private schools that the schools each other attend are no different from each other, and a good education can be received from both. However, upon arriving at Summer Heights, Ja'mie assumes that the school would be full of "bogans", "sluts", and the facilities would be "crap".

Ja'mie immediately makes friends with the most popular girls in Summer Heights High although her friendship is not genuine when her so-called friends discover a poster she has made of them calling them "povo skanks". Her manipulative character is enforced when she manages to convince her new friends that the poster was meant as a joke and that they need to "get a sense of humour". During the show, Ja'mie falls in love with Year 7 student named Sebastian and decides to go out with him. However, the relationship only lasts a short amount of time as Ja'mie steals Sebastian's mobile phone and finds out a girl called Madeline has been texting him to sit with him in English class. Ja'mie dumps him and claims he made her "question my hotness".

Later on in the show, Ja'mie and her friends form a student representative council, and decide to organise a Year 11 formal. Ja'mie plans to have it at a popular nightclub with an expensive DJ, but at $450 a ticket, the student council faces cancelling the event because the students cannot afford the tickets. Instead, Ja'mie arranges a day to raise money for AIDS in Africa, which covers the formal expenses. However, the Head of Senior School discovers the real reason for the fundraiser and as a compromise, Ja'mie is offered to hold the formal in the school's staff room, with no DJ and cheap, hand-made decorations.

Ja'mie invites Tamsin to the formal, a lesbian student, as she wants to make a big impression, but when Tamsin finds out that Ja'mie is not lesbian, she ditches her by SMS, forcing Ja'mie to instead take Sebastian, who she gets back together with just for the night. The series ends with her leaving the school after her term at Summer Heights High in the car with her mum and friend Brianna; she stands up through the car's sunroof and shouts, "Public schools rock!"

=== Ja'mie: Private School Girl and podcast ===
The show Ja'mie: Private School Girl is dedicated entirely to Ja'mie and depicts her final year of high school as she competes for the Hillford Medal. Ja'mie and all of her prefect friends are eventually expelled from Hillford Grammar, resulting in them not obtaining their Higher School Certificates. They then join a mixed state school, Blaxland College (where the students do not wear uniforms), to complete their education. Ja'mie decides to go through a "bisexual phase", starting a lesbian relationship with Astrid, who is also a student at Blaxland. However, despite proclaiming that she is "over the private school thing", Ja'mie finishes the show by stating that she "will always be a private school girl". In 2021, Ja'mie released a podcast on various platforms, including YouTube, titled Ja’miezing. In the synopsis for the podcast, Ja’mie reveals that she has since become an influencer, dubbing herself "Sydney's own Gen Z icon".

== Awards and nominations ==
=== ARIA Music Awards ===
Year	Nominee / work	Award	Result	Ref.
2014	"Learning to Be Me"	Best Comedy Release	Nominated	

=== Logie Awards ===
Year	Award	Category	Recipients and nominees	Result
2014	Most Popular Light Entertainment Program	Ja'mie: Private School Girl	Nominated	
2014	Most Popular Actor	Chris Lilley	Won	
2014	Most Outstanding Actor	Chris Lilley	Nominated	
