= Logie Awards of 2008 =

Australian television awards

50th Logie Awards
- Date: 4 May 2008
- Site: Crown Palladium, Melbourne, Victoria

Highlights
- Gold Logie: Kate Ritchie
- Hall of Fame: John Clarke
- Most awards: Home and Away (4)
- Most nominations: Home and Away (6)

Television coverage
- Network: Nine Network

The 50th Annual TV Week Logie Awards was held on Sunday 4 May 2008 at the Crown Palladium in Melbourne, and broadcast on the Nine Network. For the first time in the Logie Awards 50-year history, there was no host for the ceremony, but only a series of presenters. Also for the first time, the public were able to vote online for the "Most Popular" categories without needing to buy a copy of TV Week. The nominations were announced on 7 April 2008. Hamish Blake and Andy Lee were the backstage hosts, while Jules Lund, Livinia Nixon and Shelley Craft were the red carpet arrivals hosts.

== Winners and nominees ==
In the tables below, winners are listed first and highlighted in bold.

=== Gold Logie ===
Most Popular Personality on Australian Television
- **Kate Ritchie in Home and Away (Seven Network)**
  - Natalie Blair in Neighbours (Network Ten)
  - Andrew Denton in Enough Rope (ABC1)
  - Adam Hills in Spicks and Specks (ABC1)
  - John Howard in All Saints (Seven Network)
  - Chris Lilley in Summer Heights High (ABC1)
  - Lisa McCune in Sea Patrol (Nine Network)
  - Rove McManus in Rove and Are You Smarter Than a 5th Grader? (Network Ten)

=== Acting/Presenting ===
| Most Popular Actor | Most Popular Actress |
|---|---|
| **Chris Lilley in Summer Heights High (ABC1)**; Mark Furze in Home and Away (Seven Network); John Howard in All Saints (Seven Network); Paul O'Brien in Home and Away (Seven Network); Glenn Robbins in Kath & Kim (Seven Network) | **Kate Ritchie in Home and Away (Seven Network)**; Natalie Blair in Neighbours (Network Ten); Simmone Jade Mackinnon in McLeod's Daughters (Nine Network); Lisa McCune in Sea Patrol (Nine Network); Magda Szubanski in Kath & Kim (Seven Network) |
| Most Outstanding Actor in a Series | Most Outstanding Actress in a Series |
| **Stephen Curry in The King (TV1)**; Don Hany in East West 101 (SBS); Chris Lilley in Summer Heights High (ABC1); William McInnes in Curtin (ABC1) and East West 101 (SBS) | **Alison Whyte in Satisfaction (Showcase)**; Diana Glenn in Satisfaction (Showcase); Claudia Karvan in Love My Way (Showtime); Asher Keddie in Love My Way (Showtime); Victoria Thaine in Rain Shadow (ABC1) |
| Most Popular New Male Talent | Most Popular New Female Talent |
| **Lincoln Lewis in Home and Away (Seven Network)**; Jack Campbell in All Saints (Seven Network); Sam Clark in Neighbours (Network Ten); David Lyons in Sea Patrol (Nine Network); Stuart MacGill in Stuart MacGill Uncorked (The LifeStyle Channel) | **Bindi Irwin in Bindi: The Jungle Girl (ABC1)**; Charlotte Best in Home and Away (Seven Network); Tammy Clarkson in The Circuit (SBS); Adelaide Kane in Neighbours (Network Ten); Zoe Ventoura in Kick (SBS) |
| Most Outstanding New Talent | Most Popular Presenter |
| **Tammy Clarkson in The Circuit (SBS)**; Adelaide Clemens in Love My Way (Showtime); Nicole da Silva in Dangerous (Fox8); Sean Keenan in Lockie Leonard (Nine Network); Zoe Ventoura in Kick (SBS); Jacob Francis Worrall in So You Think You Can Dance | **Rove McManus in Rove and Are You Smarter Than a 5th Grader? (Network Ten)**; Andrew Denton in Enough Rope (ABC1); Grant Denyer in It Takes Two (Seven Network); Melissa Doyle in Sunrise and Where Are They Now? (Seven Network); Adam Hills in Spicks and Specks (ABC1) |

=== Most Popular Programs ===
| Most Popular Australian Drama Series | Most Popular Light Entertainment Program |
|---|---|
| **Home and Away (Seven Network)**; All Saints (Seven Network); City Homicide (Seven Network); McLeod's Daughters (Nine Network); Neighbours (Network Ten) | **Kath & Kim (Seven Network)**; The Chaser's War on Everything (ABC1); Spicks and Specks (ABC1); Summer Heights High (ABC1); Thank God You're Here (Network Ten) |
| Most Popular Lifestyle Program | Most Popular Factual Program |
| **Better Homes and Gardens (Seven Network)**; Getaway (Nine Network); The Great Outdoors (Seven Network); Things To Try Before You Die (Nine Network); What's Good For You (Nine Network) | **Bondi Rescue (Network Ten)**; Border Security (Seven Network); The Choir of Hard Knocks (ABC1); RPA (Nine Network); RSPCA Animal Rescue (Seven Network) |
| Most Popular Sports Program | Most Popular Reality Program |
| **The AFL Footy Show (Nine Network)**; Inside Cricket (Fox Sports 1); The NRL Footy Show (Nine Network); Sports Tonight (Network Ten); The World Game (SBS) | **Dancing with the Stars (Seven Network)**; Australian Idol (Network Ten); Big Brother (Network Ten); The Biggest Loser (Network Ten); It Takes Two (Seven Network) |

=== Most Outstanding Programs ===
| Most Outstanding Drama Series, Miniseries or Telemovie | Most Outstanding Comedy Program |
|---|---|
| **Curtin (ABC1)**; City Homicide (Seven Network); East West 101 (SBS); The King (TV1); Satisfaction (Showcase) | **Summer Heights High (ABC1)**; Kath & Kim (Seven Network); Thank God You're Here (Network Ten); The Chaser's War on Everything (ABC1); Wilfred (SBS) |
| Most Outstanding Sports Coverage | Most Outstanding News Coverage |
| **Supercheap Auto Bathurst 1000 (Seven Network)**; AFL Grand Final (Network Ten); 3 Mobile Ashes Series, Fifth Test (Nine Network); Australian Open Tennis Championships (Seven Network); FINA World Swimming Championships (Nine Network) | **"Garuda Plane Crash", Seven News (Seven Network)**; "East Timor: Finding Alfredo", Foreign Correspondent (ABC1); "Federal Election" (Sky News); "Pasha Bulker", National Nine News (Nine Network); "Timor Baucau", SBS World News (SBS) |
| Most Outstanding Children's Program | Most Outstanding Public Affairs Report |
| **Lockie Leonard (Nine Network)**; Animalia (Network Ten); Hi-5 (Nine Network); H_{2}O: Just Add Water (Network Ten); Totally Wild: Antarctica Special (Network Ten) | **"Some Meaning in This Life: Belinda Emmett", Australian Story (ABC1)**; "The Big Sting", 60 Minutes (Nine Network); "Final Call", Four Corners (ABC1); "Hicks On Trial", Insight (SBS); "Rwanda: Questions of Murder", Dateline (SBS) |
| Most Outstanding Documentary or Documentary Series | Most Outstanding Factual Series |
| **Constructing Australia: The Bridge (ABC1)**; Captain Cook: Obsession and Discovery (ABC1); Inside Australia: My Brother Vinnie (SBS); The Sounds of Aus (ABC1); The Ultimate Donation (Network Ten) | **The Choir of Hard Knocks (ABC1)**; Bondi Rescue (Network Ten); Border Security (Seven Network); The Force: Behind the Line (Seven Network); The Gift (Nine Network) |

== Performers ==
- Top 10 finalists from So You Think You Can Dance Australia
- The Last Goodnight – "Pictures of You"
- Westlife – "Something Right"
- Vanessa Amorosi – "Perfect"
- Chris Lilley as Mr G – "Naughty Girl"

== Hall of Fame ==
John Clarke became the 25th inductee into the TV Week Logies Hall of Fame.
