= Ja'mie: Private School Girl =

- Genre: Sitcom; Mockumentary; Comedy
- Created by: Chris Lilley
- Written by: Chris Lilley
- Directed by: Chris Lilley; Stuart McDonald
- Starring: Chris Lilley
- Narrated by: Chris Lilley
- Theme music composer: Chris Lilley
- Composer: John Foreman
- Country of origin: Australia
- Original language: English
- No. of seasons: 1
- No. of episodes: 6

Production
- Executive producers: Laura Waters; Chris Lilley
- Producers: Laura Waters; Chris Lilley
- Production location: Melbourne
- Cinematography: Nick Gregoric
- Editor: Ian Carmichael
- Camera setup: Multi-camera
- Running time: 25–27 minutes
- Production companies: Princess Pictures; ABC; HBO

Original release
- Network: ABC1; HBO
- Release: 23 October – 27 November 2013

Related
- Angry Boys; Jonah from Tonga; We Can Be Heroes Summer Heights High

Ja'mie: Private School Girl is an Australian television mockumentary sitcom miniseries. It is set at an exclusive private girls' grammar school in Sydney's affluent North Shore. It is written by and stars male comedian Chris Lilley as the titular character, Ja’mie King. Continuing the mockumentary style of Lilley's previous series, Ja'mie: Private School Girl follows Ja'mie King, a character who previously appeared in Lilley's series We Can Be Heroes and Summer Heights High, during her final weeks of high school.

The series is co-produced by Chris Lilley and Princess Pictures in association with ABC and HBO. The Australian Broadcasting Corporation (ABC) broadcast the show in Australia from 23 October to 27 November 2013. HBO began broadcasting the show in the United States on 24 November 2013.

== Development ==
Lilley announced that he was working on a new show on his Facebook page. The ABC confirmed that Lilley's six-part half-hour comedy series would screen in 2013. On 8 September 2013, Lilley revealed the title of the show and that the returning character to the series is Ja'mie King.

== Production ==
Melbourne-based production company Princess Pictures and Chris Lilley produced the series with Australian Broadcasting Corporation and HBO. The show was shot at Haileybury College, Melbourne.

== Broadcast and reception ==
Private School Girl debuted on ABC1 in Australia on 23 October 2013, and on HBO in North America on 24 November 2013. BBC Three began broadcasting the series in the UK on 6 February 2014 at 10pm.

Viewing figures on ABC were initially high at 924,000 viewers, but had dropped to 575,000 by the fourth episode. The series was, however, a success on ABC iview, beating earlier records set by Doctor Who.

Critical reaction has been mixed for the series. Laurence Barber of The Guardian blamed a lack of character development for its drop in popularity in Australia, believing "Lilley has made it almost impossible for us to care." Reviewing the shows broadcast on HBO, Tim Goodman of The Hollywood Reporter criticised the transition from sketch to series saying: "You'd have to be the biggest of Ja'mie fans to want to watch her talking nonstop for 30 minutes." After the show's premiere in the United Kingdom, Rebecca Smith of The Daily Telegraph praised the comedy of the first episode as well as Lilley's performance, yet believed it was "in danger of becoming one-dimensional."

== Characters ==
=== Ja'mie King ===
Ja'mie King, portrayed by Chris Lilley, is the main character of the show. She was also a main character in two of Lilley's previous shows, We Can Be Heroes and Summer Heights High. Ja'mie: Private School Girl follows Ja'mie in her final year of school, having left Summer Heights High and returned to Hillford Girls Grammar School.

=== Mitchell ===
Mitchell Ward, portrayed by Lester Ellis Jr., is Ja'mie's love interest. A new Year 10 student on a rugby scholarship who Ja'mie calls "totally quiche", at the boys' school Kelton Boys Grammar down the road.

=== Prefects ===
The Prefects are Ja'mie's friend group at school and the most popular clique at Hilford. They are self-described as the quichest girls at the school, "quiche" being a term made up by Ja'mie herself, meaning "a step above hot". All the girls are expelled at the end of episode 6 after they give a raunchy performance at the Hilford Presentation evening. They all enroll with Ja'mie at Blaxland College, shown in the 6-month skip.

- Madison Cartwright portrayed by Georgie Jennings; The most perfect prefect, is Ja'mie's best friend until episode 4. She falls out with her after Ja'mie learns she spent a free period with Mitchell which also led to a break-up between him and Ja'mie. Ja'mie tries to take back her prefect status and the two engage in a cat fight. In episode 5, she and Ja'mie make up after Mitchell sends a dick pic to Ja'mie and she lies to Madison about all these horrible things Mitchell said about her, leading to her dumping him.
- Olivia Harrington portrayed by Georgia Treu
- Imogen "Immy" Gallagher portrayed by Laura Grady
- Morgan Courtier portrayed by Phoebe Roberts
- Alexandria "Alex" Lupinski portrayed by D'arci Buckerfield
- Isabella "Bella" Mansouri portrayed by Tayla Duyal

=== Courtney King ===
Courtney, portrayed by Madelyn Warrell, is Ja'mie's younger sister who also attends Hilford. She is the subject of a lot of Ja'mie's abuse, particularly over her singing in the school choir. She and her friend Selena (Thi Reynolds) film Ja'mie's risqué dance performance with Mitchell. Courtney is in year 11

=== Cody ===
Cody Bomhoff, portrayed by Alex Cooper, is Ja'mie's "GBF" (Gay Best Friend). He attends Kelton Boys Grammar and is the first to inform Ja'mie about the arrival of Mitchell. He takes dance class at Hilford with Ja'mie due to Kelton not having a class. He is responsible for Ja'mie's rebel makeover in episode 5 and he also accompanies her to visit Kwami for the last time.

=== Other characters ===
- Jhyll King, portrayed by Jhyll Teplin, is Ja'mie's mother (previously seen in We Can Be Heroes and Summer Heights High). She is still abused regularly by Ja'mie.
- Marcus King, portrayed by Brad Brivik, is Ja'mie's father, whom she often manipulates for her own gain.
- Mandy Bryant, portrayed by Monique Max, is Marcus' assistant who Ja'mie likes due to her being young and agreeing with Ja'mie's idea for a party. It's implied that Marcus is having an affair with her.
- Mr. Hayes, portrayed by Wayne Perkins, is the deputy principal of Hilford Girls Grammar. He may appear blind to Ja'mie ongoing nastiness however he isn't always completely oblivious. After threatening to expel Ja'mie in episode 5, he finally does so at the end of episode 6. After stopping Ja'mie's rant about the Hilford Medal, he is forced to intervene when Ja'mie plays the video of her and Kwami. He and Ms. Welham expel Ja'mie and the Prefects following their raunchy performance at the presentation evening.
- Ms. Welham, portrayed by Lise Rodgers, is one of the principals of Hilford Girls Grammar (previously seen in We Can Be Heroes and Summer Heights High). Unlike We Can Be Heroes and Summer Heights High where she appears to think highly of Ja'mie, she seems to have a very poor opinion on her. In episode 5, she is forwarded the raunchy video of Ja'mie and Kwami, which infuriates her and worries about the schools high reputation being damaged by the video. When Ja'mie and the Prefects do their raunchy performance at the Hilford presentation evening, Ms. Welham is last seen glaring at Ja'mie with fury from the audience. Both her and Mr. Hayes expel Ja'mie and the Prefects at the conclusion of the presentation evening.
- Lauren Nikolov, portrayed by Rose Flanagan is one of the "Boarders", a group of girls that Ja'mie refers to as fat girls and lesbians. She and Ja'mie have a mutual dislike of each other. In episode 3 she turns up at Ja'mie's party, and when denied access, insists that Ja'mie is fat herself causing her to have a brief meltdown.
- Erin Walker, portrayed by Brodie Dare, is another "Boarder". She is in Ja'mie's dance class and like Ja'mie she does charity work, a fact Ja'mie resents. In episode 5 it is revealed that she has won the Hilford medal causing Ja'mie much distress. In episode 6, she wins the medal and performs her dance at Speech Night, much to Ja'mie's disgust. It is mentioned after the 6-month skip that Erin has a boyfriend and she is supposedly getting married so she can have sex, due to her Christian values.
- Kwami Onwuatuegwu, portrayed by Albert Mambo, is a Ugandan boy who Ja'mie Skype-chats with every night. In episode 2 he sends a photo of his penis to Ja'mie. He moves in with the Kings in episode 3 and attends Ja'mie's party. In episode 5 he is kicked out of the King's home after Mr King discovers that he was showing his penis on Skype to Ja'mie as she was showing him her breasts. Ja'mie later visits him to explain why he was kicked out, revealing that she only used him to help her cause for the Hilford Medal. He claims that he loves her, however she rejects him and leaves. In episode 6, Ja'mie shows the video of her and Kwami at the Speech Night leading to her being expelled.
- Astrid O'Hara is Ja'mie's girlfriend. After Ja'mie gets expelled from Hilford Girls Grammar she starts going to a new school Blaxland College and goes through her "bisexual phase", and it is shown that Ja'mie often starts fights with Astrid and threatens to break up with her.
- Brianna, portrayed by Emma Hawkins, she was best friends with Ja'mie in We Can Be Heroes and Summer Heights High. Ja'mie states that she is no longer her friend because she became 'fat' and 'sorta indie'. In episode 5, Madison begins to hang out with her and her friends after she argued with the Prefects as well as to get back at Ja'mie.
- Emma, portrayed by Sharley White, is a part of Ja'mie's former best friend group. Even though Ja'mie no longer hangs out with them in this season, Madison soon joins the group to get revenge.
- Mel, played by Alice Stewart, like Emma is a part of Ja'mie's ex-friends group. Madison also befriends Mel to get back at Ja'mie.

== Episodes ==
| No. | Title | Directed by | Written by | Original release date | Australian viewers |
|---|---|---|---|---|---|
| 1 | "Episode 1" | Chris Lilley and Stuart McDonald | Chris Lilley | 23 October 2013 | 920,000 |
Ja'mie is 17 and in the last few months of her schooling at Hillford Girls Grammar. As school captain, she and her prefects perform a dance at assembly to honour some elderly Hillford Girls alumni who are visiting as part of centenary celebrations. However, they are reprimanded by Mr Hayes for their risqué dance moves and the fact their bras are showing. Ja'mie reveals that she has ditched her friends Brianna, Emma & Mel (previously seen in We Can Be Heroes and Summer Heights High), as she has gained weight. Ja'mie now has a new group of friends whom she describes as all being 'quiche', a word she made up, meaning hotter than hot. Ja'mie also reveals that she is still working in the community, visiting the African refugees and reading to her teenage Ugandan friend Kwami over Skype, who lives in Western Sydney. She believes herself to be the ideal Hillford Girl, and thus deserving of the Hillford Medal, awarded to the student who is considered the best student in Year 12. The girls discuss the erecting of a statue of this year's Hillford Medal winner, all believing that Ja'mie will win. Later at the bus stop in front of Kelton Boys Grammar, Ja'mie's talks to her gay BFF Cody. He informs her of the arrival of Mitchell, a hot rugby scholarship student in Year 10 of whom Ja'mie immediately becomes infatuated with. She drives home with her mother and sister, almost crashing the car due to arguing with her sister and mother whilst texting. At home, Ja'mie and her friends manage to persuade Ja'mie's father to agree to let Ja'mie throw a party at their house. She invites Mitchell.
| 2 | "Episode 2" | Chris Lilley and Stuart McDonald | Chris Lilley | 30 October 2013 | 880,000 |
After Kwami sends Ja'mie a dick pic, she talks about it at school with her friends. The girls then talk about Mitchell. She names her upcoming party "The Perfect Prefect Party" and invites all the Year 12 students except all the boarders and most of the Asians. Ja'mie practises her HSC dance solo and competes against her rival, Erin, a boarder whom Ja'mie is convinced is a lesbian. In a ploy to get more attention from Mitchell, Ja'mie does a solo dance for him at school, which is interrupted by a teacher who sends him off the premises because boys are not allowed in the school.
| 3 | "Episode 3" | Chris Lilley and Stuart McDonald | Chris Lilley | 6 November 2013 | 590,000 |
Ja'mie takes in Kwami, as her "project." She brings him to Hillford, where she makes a speech and introduces him. He performs a dance, then she shows him around the school. She brings him to her house, to live there for a month. The boarders try to crash the Perfect Prefect Party, but are kept out and they trade insults with Ja'mie at her front gate. While she is sitting next to Mitchell, she falsely claims that they hooked up and are now an item. She changes her Facebook status accordingly.
| 4 | "Episode 4" | Chris Lilley and Stuart McDonald | Chris Lilley | 13 November 2013 | 580,000 |
Ja'mie claims that she is now officially 'dating' Mitchell. One day, Mitchell's Facebook relationship status reads "single," along with an update saying he was hanging out with Ja'mie's best friend, Madison. Ja'mie confronts Madison, who says that she and he kissed, and that he and Ja'mie were never an item. The two girls fight verbally and physically, and Ja'mie falls into a depression. She asks Mitchell if he kissed Madison; he says yes, and that and that he did not think that they were exclusive. Madison and Mitchell become a couple. Ja'mie says that she tried her mother's antidepressants, but they did not work. Cody tells Ja'mie that she needs a makeover to make her feel better. She agrees and decides that a slutty, rebellious look and attitude will suit her.
| 5 | "Episode 5" | Chris Lilley and Stuart McDonald | Chris Lilley | 20 November 2013 | 640,000 |
Ja'mie is in trouble with the school and her father after an illicit Skype video is made public, wherein she shows her breasts to Kwami while wearing the school uniform and singing the school song. Kwami is kicked out of the King household. He tells Ja'mie that he loves her and he makes it clear that he wants to have sex with her. She rejects him and tells him that the only reason that she invited him to stay at her house was to improve her chances of winning the Hillford Medal. Mitchell texts Ja'mie a dick pic. Ja'mie tells Madison, and shows her the pic. Ja'mie falsely claims that he said several insulting things about Madison to her. Ja'mie suggests to Madison that she dump him, which she says that she will do. Ja'mie tells Madison that she wants to be best friends with Madison again, which she agrees to. Erin tells Ja'mie that she is being awarded the Hillford Medal, which Ja'mie is furious about.
| 6 | "Episode 6" | Chris Lilley and Stuart McDonald | Chris Lilley | 27 November 2013 | 620,000 |
Unhappy with the decision to award the Hillford Medal to Erin rather than her, Ja'mie makes a scene on stage at presentation night by claiming that she should have received it instead, and that she was denied it because she had an interracial relationship. She arranges for Madison to show on a large screen the video of Ja'mie exposing her breasts. Ja'mie is joined onstage by the prefects. All the girls take their dresses off, and Ja'mie also takes her bra off. Ja'mie and all the prefects are expelled, so they did not get their HSCs. Ja'mie lands at Kelton in a helicopter and kisses Mitchell. She later dumps him for grinding against her and sending her dick pics. She does aid work in Uganda. Ja'mie and all the prefects join a mixed state school, Blaxland College (where the students do not wear uniforms), to re-do their HSCs. Ja'mie is in a lesbian relationship with Astrid, who is also a student at Blaxland.

== Awards and nominations ==
| Year | Award | Category | Recipients and nominees | Result |
|---|---|---|---|---|
| 2014 | Logie Awards | Most Popular Light Entertainment Program | Ja'mie: Private School Girl | Nominated |
| 2014 | Logie Awards | Most Popular Actor | Chris Lilley | Won |
| 2014 | Logie Awards | Most Outstanding Actor | Chris Lilley | Nominated |

== Home video releases ==
| Series | Set details | DVD release dates | | | Special features |
| Series | Set details | Region 1 | Region 2 | Region 4 | Special features |
|---|---|---|---|---|---|
| Ja'mie: Private School Girl | 2 discs; 6 episodes | 5 August 2014 | 16 June 2014 | 28 November 2013 | Deleted scenes; Bloopers; Behind-the scenes featurettes |
