= Summer Heights High =

2007 Australian television mockumentary series

- Genre: Sitcom; Mockumentary; Comedy
- Created by: Chris Lilley
- Written by: Chris Lilley
- Directed by: Stuart McDonald
- Starring: Chris Lilley
- Composer: Bryony Marks
- Country of origin: Australia
- Original language: English
- No. of seasons: 1
- No. of episodes: 8

Production
- Producer: Laura Waters
- Running time: 27 minutes
- Production companies: Princess Pictures; ABC

Original release
- Network: ABC TV
- Release: 5 September – 24 October 2007

Related
- Ja'mie: Private School Girl; Jonah from Tonga

Summer Heights High is an Australian television mockumentary sitcom written by and starring Chris Lilley. Set in the fictional Summer Heights High School in an outer suburb of Sydney (based on Summer Hill), it revolves around high-school experiences from the viewpoints of three individuals: the "Director of Performing Arts", Mr G; private-school exchange student Ja'mie King; and disobedient, vulgar Tongan-Australian student Jonah Takalua. The series lampoons Australian high-school life and many aspects of the human condition and is filmed as a documentary with non-actors playing supporting characters. As he did in a previous series, We Can Be Heroes: Finding the Australian of the Year, Lilley plays multiple characters, including the aforementioned Mr G, Ja'mie and Jonah. The series premiered on 5 September 2007 at 9:30 pm on ABC TV and ended on 24 October 2007, only lasting eight episodes.

Summer Heights High was a massive ratings success for the Australian Broadcasting Corporation, and was met with mostly positive critical reaction. In 2008, the series won a Logie Award for Most Popular Light Entertainment/Comedy Program. On 26 March 2008, it was announced that the show had been sold for international distribution to BBC Three in the United Kingdom, HBO in the United States, and The Comedy Network in Canada. Following the success of Summer Heights High, Lilley has developed two spin-off shows: Ja'mie: Private School Girl (2013) and Jonah from Tonga (2014).

== Format ==
According to the prologue, a production and filming team travelled to an Australian public high school and followed the daily life of the students and staff for one term. The team would film a documentary from the opinions of the students and staff, especially the three main characters: Ja'mie King, a Mean Girl–type perfectionist exchanged from a private school; Mr G, a drama teacher with an inflated sense of his talent; and Jonah Takalua, a stereotypical Tongan delinquent, all played by the series' writer, Chris Lilley.

The series is filmed in a documentary style, with the supporting cast drawn from the real-life students and staff of the school where the series was filmed. The program explored the facets of a typical Australian public high school such as social problems, bullying, teenage slang, stereotyping, sexism, racism, and homophobia by showcasing three different individuals: the bully; the rich private school girl; and the teacher. The three main characters' storylines never intersect, though the school principal Margaret Murray appears in all of their stories.

== Cast and characters ==
The series focuses on three primary characters, all portrayed by Chris Lilley, at Summer Heights High:

- Ja'mie King, a 16-year-old private-school exchange student who immediately makes friends with the four most popular girls in Year 11. She badmouths her new friends behind their backs, and plans an extravagant school formal. Ja'mie is manipulative, snobbish, unkind, and exhibits a racist attitude towards Asian students. The character first featured on Lilley's previous series We Can Be Heroes.
- Jonah Takalua, a 13-year-old schoolboy of Tongan descent in Year 8. Having previously been expelled from two other schools, Jonah exhibits behavioral issues and is continually in conflict with classmates and teachers that places him at serious risk of expulsion. Jonah also has learning difficulties and attends a remedial English class at "Gumnut Cottage".
- Mr G, an egomaniacal 37-year-old drama teacher who believes that he is an incredibly talented, well-liked teacher whose students share his intense passion for drama and performance; his narcissism places him in constant conflict with other staff members and the school's principal. Mr G is directing his latest school musical, which is based on the death of a student at the school who overdosed on ecstasy. The character was previously featured on the Seven Network sketch series Big Bite.

There are also a number of supporting characters:

- Margaret Murray (Elida Brereton), the principal of Summer Heights High. Brereton was a real-life principal at Camberwell High School.
- Rodney Parsons (Stan Roach), a science teacher at the school who is also Mr G's officemate and close friend.
- Doug Peterson (David Lennie), the student welfare officer who is determined to help Jonah and keep him from getting expelled; he also runs the "Polynesian Pathways" course.
- Ms Wheatley (Kristy Barnes Cullen), Jonah's language teacher who is constantly aggravated by Jonah and his friends.
- Ms Palmer (Maude Davey), teaches students with reading difficulties at Gumnut Cottage which both Jonah and Leon attend; she is Jonah's favourite teacher.
- Leon Pullami (Asolima Tauati), Jonah's best friend and partner in crime.
- Holly (Jessica Featherby), Bec (Nicole Joy Tan), Jess (Kristie Coade), and Kaitlyn (Alicia Banit) are the popular girls in Year 11 who Ja'mie befriends.
- Ashley, a less-popular Year 11 girl who Ja'mie harasses and calls "fugly" on numerous occasions.
- Candice Coxmurray (Kelly Dingledei), the star of Mr G's musical.
- Keiran McKenna (Ashley McLerie), Jonah's nemesis who is a Year 7 student and very talented breakdancer.
- Toby (Danny Alsabbagh), a Year 10 boy who has Down syndrome. He is originally Mr G's backstage assistant, but then plays the character of Mr G in the musical.
- Rocky Takalua (Tovia Matiasi), Jonah's no-nonsense father, who constantly threatens to send Jonah back to Tonga if he misbehaves.
- Ofa (Ofa Palu), the only girl in Jonah's friendship group.
- Annabel Dickson (Coby Ramsden), the inspiration for Mr G's initial musical. In the series her only appearance is in a photograph, but she's featured in a deleted scene on the DVD release.
- Stuart (Vincent Chiang), a student at the school.

Mrs. Murray, the principal, is the only character mentioned or acknowledged in all three of the main characters' lives. The main characters do not interact with each other, however:

- Doug Peterson, the head of student welfare, is mentioned in Ja'mie's storyline in Episode 5 when she tells Mr. Cameron, the upper school head, that she's been cutting her wrists because he wouldn't let them have a formal.
- One of the students who attends Gumnut Cottage with Jonah and Leon also appears in Mr G's musical
- Miss Wheatley is acted out in Mr. G's musical, but her name is not mentioned.
- When Mr. G was pointing to the 1999 staff photo in Episode 1, Mr. Cameron's picture is seen beside one of Mr. G.
- A teacher named Mr. James makes two short appearances – once in Jonah's storyline in Episode 1, and once in Mr. G's storyline in Episode 3.

== Background and production ==
Summer Heights High was created and written by Chris Lilley, with all eight episodes directed by Stuart McDonald. Princess Pictures produced the series, with Laura Waters and Bruce Kane serving as executive producers. The series was filmed in Melbourne at Brighton Secondary College.

== Episodes ==
No.	Title	Original release date	Australia viewers (millions)
1	"Episode 1"	5 September 2007	1.22
Ja'mie King: Ja'mie arrives at Summer Heights High for an orientation day ahead of her first day of the student exchange program. After a tour by principal Ms Margaret Murray, Ja'mie introduces herself at school assembly, bragging about her rich and lavish lifestyle from "one of the most expensive private girls' schools in the state". She talks down to the students, saying that they are all povo bogans and "really dumb". Mr G: Mr G is supporting Head of Drama Mrs Meredith Cotton with the upcoming school production of Anything Goes. He then brags about his life story in performing arts and discusses a typical drama class, where he incorporates his unique teaching style. He sees his role at the school to teach drama and dance to change lives, inspire students, and to encourage the students to dare to dream. Along with his loyal sidekick, science teacher, Mr Rodney Parsons, Mr G criticises and is frustrated by his superior Mrs Cotton, as well as complaining about the lack of funding and support given by the school's principal. Jonah Takalua: Jonah first appears in the office of the student welfare officer, Mr Doug Peterson, after Jonah and his friends Leon and Joseph bullied a Year 7 ginger-haired student named Ben at the train station. Mr Peterson later on describes Jonah's family, his school history, his erratic and aggressive behaviour, and his ADD. In his English class, Jonah is disruptive and rude to others in the class, including to the English teacher, Ms Sarah Wheatley. He claims that he gets into trouble because the teachers are racist. Jonah tells of his life ambition to be a professional breakdancer when he is older, and that he is only stupid because he chooses not to be smart.
2	"Episode 2"	12 September 2007	1.38
Ja'mie King: At Ja'mie's first day at Summer Heights High, she is paired with fellow student, Ashley, whom Ja'mie describes as "the fugliest girl I have ever met in my life". Ja'mie is taken to classes and shown around the school by Ashley, and tries to fit in with Ashley and her friends during lunch. After uncomfortable silences caused by the lack of similarities while trying to get to know each other, Ja'mie asks Ashley who the "hot" and "popular" girls of Year 11 are, and promptly asks to be introduced to them. This introduction sees Ja'mie fitting in well with this group of girls and abandons Ashley, however later Ja'mie has an emotional breakdown while remembering the school and friends she left behind while having to deal with the dramatic changes thanks to the exchange program. Mr G: The Head of Drama, Mrs Cotton, has gone to New Zealand due to her mother suddenly falling very ill, and therefore Mr G has been promoted to Acting Head of Drama, renaming his title as "Director of Performing Arts". Thrilled with the temporary promotion, he makes a few changes such as clearing-out Mrs Cotton's desk and moving himself in, and walking around the school to pass on the news to students of his new role. He also gets support staff to do work for him, complains about noise from the gym, and requests teachers "under the umbrella of Performing Arts" to fill-in classes and duties he is too busy for; fellow teaching staff complain to the Principal about his now selfish and bossy demeanour. He also unveils plans for a new performing arts centre with a 10,000-seat theatre complex that will require the demolition of demountable classrooms used by the special education students. Mr G then cancels the school production Anything Goes with plans to write his own "better show". Jonah Takalua: Jonah and his friends participate in an ethnic acceptance program created by the school's student welfare officer, Mr Doug Peterson, called "Polynesian Pathways", and enrolls Jonah into 'a contract' to get Jonah to improve his behaviour and academic levels. With his best friend, Leon, Jonah is also enrolled at Gumnut Cottage for remedial reading lessons five periods a week with Ms Jan Palmer, who seems to understand Jonah better than her fellow teachers and begins to form a connection with him. Jonah is reading at an eight-year-old level, however he becomes angry at having to read children's books and continues his disruptive behaviour as he did in other classes. Despite his rude and disrespectful behavior towards her at times, Jonah thinks that Ms Palmer is one of the 'maddest' (best) teachers in the world, and Jonah does a little breakdance in front of her at the end of class, which seems to impress her.
3	"Episode 3"	19 September 2007	1.28
Ja'mie King: Ja'mie decides that it would be a good idea if she dates a younger guy. She therefore targets a Year 7 student, Sebastian – to the shock of her Year 11 friends. However Ja'mie is shocked to discover messages from Sebastian to another girl Year 7 student on his mobile phone but exaggerates the meaning of the texts because they only talk about "saving each other a seat in English". The relationship ends with an emotional confrontation at the school gate. Mr G: After learning of the death of a Year 11 student, Annabelle Dickson, due to an overdose of ecstasy, Mr G uses the event as his inspiration for the school's new production. Jonah Takalua: On the day of the junior school dance, Jonah wears pants stained with “semen” to the school, making his friends embarrassed and encouraging him to show it to his English teacher, Miss Wheatley. He is counselled by Mr Peterson from Miss Wheatley; Mr Peterson thinks that Jonah had provoked her by showing her the stains on Jonah's pants and telling her what they were; and orders Jonah to change clothes before the event into clothes which are rather embarrassing for him. He is then sent to the sick bay to have a chat to the school nurse. During the dance, he becomes involved in a fight with Kieran, a talented Year 7 breakdancer, and is subsequently removed from the event and sent home.
4	"Episode 4"	26 September 2007	1.24
Ja'mie King: Ja'mie's friends discover that she has been badmouthing them to her old friends behind their backs, with posters containing phrases such as "Bogan Alert! Public School Skank Society". They have a falling out, resulting in Ja'mie getting shunned in the school yard as the bad word spreads. Ja'mie has an emotional breakdown, leading to a fiery confrontation between her and the girls. Ja'mie convinces the girls to see the situation from her perspective, which leads them to forget their tiff and all become friends once again. Mr G: The rigorous auditions for "Annabelle Dickson" The Musical" have begun, with Mr G "casting the net wide. He conducts psychological evaluations on the interested students before traditional auditions and later excludes all of the special-ed students. After call-backs, Mr G splits the students into two groups to deliver the news of who is through. Jonah Takalua: Jonah attends another remedial English class at Gumnut Cottage, where his drawing skills are encouraged by Ms Palmer. As he does not want to do a class presentation on The Outsiders, he shows Ms Palmer a drawing of his father touching his genitals, leading to a serious meeting between himself, his father, Mr Peterson and Ms Palmer. Jonah is finally pressured into revealing that he made up the allegation to get out of doing his English assignment.
5	"Episode 5"	3 October 2007	1.16
Ja'mie King: Ja'mie asks Head of Senior School Mr Cameron for a Year 11 formal who refuses because it will be disruptive. Ja'mie and her friends decide to go on a protest by starving themselves but it is not successful. Ja'mie then thinks she can fake her way into getting the formal approved if she pretends to be cutting her wrists. Her persuasion causes Mr Cameron to reconsider and allows them to explain why there should be a formal during the school assembly. Ja'mie finally gets her formal. Mr G: Mr G and his cast are rehearsing for "Annabelle Dickson: The Musical". But the principal, Ms Murray thinks that he's been excluding some of the special-ed students from the musical. Mr G doesn't like the idea and is intrigued when Rodney explains a story about a school that had a mother find human feces in one of the special-ed rooms therefore making the health department kicking the special-ed students out. Mr G tries this but fails as the school cleaner steam cleans the room in the morning. Jonah Takalua: Jonah is up to his insulting antics once more. After misbehaving again, Mr Peterson issues him and his gang a group of Year 7 boys who are struggling socially. If they succeed in helping the Year 7 boys adjust, they get to perform their breakdancing demo on assembly. However, Jonah and his friends end up bullying them. Mr Peterson finds out about the incident and was about to ban them from breakdancing, but Jonah and his friends apologise to the Year 7 boys they've bullied, making Mr Peterson give them a second chance at the school swimming carnival. However, Jonah decides to misbehave again by sending a photograph of his bare buttocks to all the teacher's mobile phones, causing Mr Peterson to tell Jonah that the breakdancing demo in assembly is cancelled.
6	"Episode 6"	10 October 2007	1.19
Ja'mie King: Ja'mie and the girls begin plans for the Year 11 formal. Due to their extravagant plans, however, tickets cost $450 and no one in the school will buy them. When one of the girls decides to bring a disabled hot guy to the formal, Ja'mie decides to get even better 'cred' by inviting Tamsin Walker, a lesbian. Ja'mie asks Tamsin to the formal, insisting that she too is lesbian. Mr G: "Annabelle Dickson: The Musical" is falling apart just 10 days before opening night; Annabelle Dickson's parents refuse to have the musical focus on their daughter, resulting in Mr G re-working it into "Mr G: The Musical" to tell his life story with a later reference to an Annabelle-like character; the school can't afford his arena seating; his lead actor quits and is replaced by Toby, a child with Down syndrome; and then Mr G's dog, Celine, is hit and apparently killed by a car. Jonah Takalua: Jonah gets in a fight with his breakdancing nemesis Kieran after an argument this morning and is subsequently banned from the "amphitheatre" in the playground where the Polynesian kids traditionally hang out. In retaliation, they vandalise the Year 7 lockers, and Jonah is subsequently suspended for 3 days.
7	"Episode 7"	17 October 2007	1.31
Ja'mie King: Ja'mie and her friends need $5000 to pay the formal DJ upfront, otherwise he will not perform at the formal. Ja'mie suggests a themed dress-up day and fashion parade to raise the money. She presents to the school at assembly, saying that the money will go to AIDS charities in Africa when the funds are really going to finance the formal. The charity days seems to be going well, until Ja'mie is pulled into Mr Cameron's office after Ashley told him the truth; the money will need to go to a real AIDS charity, the formal is at risk of being cancelled, and Ja'mie faces going back to her own school early. Ja'mie brings in her mum to pay for the DJ and the venue for the formal, but Mr Cameron refuses; the formal will be held in the staff room with stereo music and standard decorations, upsetting Ja'mie before being told it's either that or no formal at all. Mr G: Ms Murray tells Mr G that Mrs Cotton is returning to the school as Head of Drama. She further aggravates him by saying that drama is a "small department" and she cannot afford the arena seating for the musical. He sees himself as undervalued by the school and insults Ms Murray before handing in his letter of resignation and storming out of her office. He uses the PA system to force his views on the school, organises his own farewell card and cancels the musical before making his drama students perform a guard of honour as he walks out of the school gate for the last time. Mr G is then later shown driving outside the school repeatedly in his car, asking students from his car window if his resignation is impacting the school. Margaret sees him from her office and comes out to speak with him in his car, where she asks him to reconsider his resignation and offers him the title of 'Creative Coordinator of the Drama Department' which he calls insulting. When Margaret tells him the musical is still going ahead with Meredith directing, Mr G decides to return to Summer Heights to solely focus on directing the show (and not teach). Jonah Takalua: Jonah and his father return to Summer Heights High after his three-day suspension, discussing behavioural changes that will be made. Jonah is later banned from breakdancing on school premises as it encourages fights with other students, with his father threatening to send him back to his home country of Tonga. At his remedial English class at Gumnut Cottage, Ms Palmer announces an upcoming "story day" where the students will dress smartly and bring in their parents on the last day of term. Jonah and his friends are pressured into a breakdancing battle after school by Kieran via text message. In his final class for the day, Jonah is being disruptive and results in Ms Wheatley losing her temper and shouting insults at him, mocking him for not being able to read, which provokes Jonah to say to her, "Don't fuck with me Miss, you'll regret it," finally making her overreact by screaming at him and telling him off that, "I've had just had about enough of you in this class", before she orders him to grab his belongings and go to the principal's office, causing his friends to passionately stick up for him to no avail and tell her to calm down – Leon was going to tell Miss Wheatley to calm down and that it was actually her who provoked Jonah first and made him angry, upset, hurt his feelings, and made fun of him, especially his inability to read, and swore and threaten her back for a reason, while Joseph tells Miss Wheatley that, "Jonah's going back to Tonga" – but Jonah responds and grabs his belongings and goes straight away to the principal's office before he can leave after the last bell.
8	"Episode 8"	24 October 2007	1.51
Ja'mie King: Ja'mie and her friends begin excitedly decorating the staff room for the formal after accepting Mr Cameron's compromise, with Ja'mie's mum purchasing an ice sculpture. After not returning Ja'mie's texts, Tasmin finally says that she won't go to formal with Ja'mie as she found out that she's not a real lesbian; Jamie instead brings Sebastian as a replacement. Ja'mie complains about people sucking up to her and the less popular girls trying to hook up with other guys. The formal awards then begin with Ja'mie winning the "hottest exchange student" award, and manages to incorporate "povo school student" remarks into her acceptance speech, before grabbing Sebastian and heads off to dance with her friends to "Everybody (Backstreet's Back)". Three weeks later on the last day of term, Ja'mie is celebrating with her friends. She decides to have a long-distance relationship with Sebastian via text message, making Tasmin jealous. Ja'mie's friends want to keep in contact over the holidays, with Ja'mie giving a mixed response. Her friend from Hilford, Brianna, arrives by car to pick her up and Ja'mie tells her friends to stay at the gate to avoid being seen with her. She shouts "Public Schools Rock!" from the car's sunroof before discarding her Summer Heights High jumper on the road. Mr G: Mr G announces the opening night of "Mr G: The Musical" over the PA system and gives Toby extra rehearsals for his role as Mr G. Rodney shows up with his German shepherd, Arnold, to replace Celine in the show. On opening night, Toby is dubbed over by Mr G. Jessica and Celine's death scene then performed with Mr G publicly shaming Rodney as causing Celine's death. Mr G then appears on stage to make an announcement before the finale that he will stay at the school after all and continuing teaching. He then tells Tony to leave the stage, taking his place for the finale number "The Smell of Life". During the song, a pre-planned banner appears behind announcing his comeback to teaching. Three weeks later on the last day of term, Mr G declared the musical a "hit" despite poor ticket sales leading to only one show being performed. He took the offer of the 'Creative Coordinator of the Drama Department' title and has moved his office and drama room to one of the former special education portable classrooms, which he calls his 'Gregson Performing Arts Centre', after most of the special education students were removed from the school because Mr G again put faeces on the floor of the classroom. Toby remains at the school on an integration program. Mr G is then shown preparing a time capsule, containing mostly items about himself, which will buried near the classroom and dug up in 100 years time. The capsule is then shown being buried, with staff and students looking on. Celine is then revealed to be still alive after being hit by the car, but is now forced to use a wheelchair for her back legs. He kept it a secret until now because he didn't want the disabled dog in the musical. At the school gate, Mr G can't control Celine on the footpath near the road and wishes goodbye to students over a portable amplifier. Jonah Takalua: Jonah and his father are shown having a meeting with Margaret, Doug and his teacher Ms Wheatley, which Jonah threatened in English class yesterday. Jonah is told by the staff that he is being expelled and is no longer welcome at Summer Heights High, despite Jonah's father's pleas. Jonah will now be sent back to Tonga as per his father's wishes and depressingly walks to his locker to empty it out. He then decides to attend his remedial English class instead, with Jan un-aware of his expulsion. Doug eventually finds Jonah and speaks briefly to Jan about the situation before asking Jonah to come with him. Jonah doesn't respond, which forces Doug to grab him and forcibly drag him out of the classroom, causing his friends to passionately stick up for him to no avail as for the very same thing as they did with the conflict between Jonah and Miss Wheatley during the last period of his English class yesterday. Three weeks later on the last day of term, it is Gumnut Cottage's story day and Jonah's friend Leon is shown finishing reading his story. Leon and his friends then notice Jonah all dressed up outside the classroom and one of them tells Jan. Jan tells him to let Jonah in the classroom on the sly. Jonah is then invited to read his story in front of the class, which he receives applause for at the end, making Jan proud. At the school gate, Doug has a quick word with Jonah and wishes him luck in Tonga. Jonah's friends suggest bullying Kieran but Jonah declines. Ms Wheatley says a quick goodbye before they walk out onto the street, where Jonah and Leon start break dancing on the road. Scenes are then shown of Jonah's last vandalism attack at the school, which he defaced Kieran and his friend's backpacks, Ms Wheatley's office door, staff member's cars, and the roof of one of the school buildings with his 'dick-tation' graffiti tag.

== Release ==
=== Broadcast ===
The series premiered on 5 September 2007 at 9:30 pm on ABC TV and continued for eight weekly episodes until 24 October 2007. Each episode was also made available for download as a vodcast directly after its screening via the ABC website and iTunes. The third episode was accidentally made available to the ABC website a week early, leading to it also being uploaded to YouTube prior to its television broadcast.

The series was sold overseas, with Lilley embarking on a promotional tour of the United States to promote the U.S. broadcast of the series, which began to air on HBO on 9 November 2008. Lilley had previously declined proposals to remake the series for American audiences. The series also aired on BBC Three in June 2008.

=== Home media ===
Summer Heights High was released on DVD in Australia on 25 October 2007, and was accompanied by a signing appearance by Lilley at an ABC Shop in Melbourne's CBD. It was a new first-day sales record for an ABC release, with 3,475 copies sold. Overall, Summer Heights High is the highest-selling Australian comedy television series on DVD.

== Soundtrack ==
A soundtrack was released through ABC Shops and the Australian iTunes Store, the latter also containing audio extracts from songs in the series including Mr G's "Bummer Heights High", "Naughty Girl", "She's a Slut" and Jonah's "Being a Poly". Part 2 of the soundtrack of the Summer Heights High album contained songs such as "My Name Is Mr G", "This Time You're Dead" and the Summer Heights High theme. Most of the songs from Part 2 are from the final musical.

"Naughty Girl" was released as a single on 8 March 2008 with remixes by Paul Mac, John Paul Talbot and Stylaz Fuego, peaking at number seven on the Australian ARIA Singles Chart. There was also a new music video clip to go with the song.

== Reception ==
=== Critical response ===
When Summer Heights High aired in Australia, reviewers generally praised Chris Lilley's humour. Writing for TV Tonight, David Knox called the series "a treat" and stated "Lilley is the best comic to emerge from the ABC since Kath & Kim came into their own". The Daily Telegraph published a review calling the series "astonishing work that will be long remembered".

Summer Heights High received generally favourable reviews from American critics; it holds a Metacritic score of 67 out of 100. Robert Lloyd of the Los Angeles Times praised Lilley's performance of Jonah, saying the character "gives the series the heart without which it would otherwise expire". Some critics noted the humour may not translate to American audiences; David Hinckley of the New York Daily News said "while its outrageous characters are often amusing, their palate of jokes runs thin".

=== Ratings ===
View count for Summer Heights High (five capital cities) View source data.

The premiere episode of Summer Heights High did well in the ratings as a strong lead-in from the return of The Chaser's War on Everything. It peaked at 1.6 million viewers (5 capital cities) with an average of 1.22 million. Along with Spicks and Specks, Summer Heights High helped ABC TV to achieve its strongest midweek ratings for 2007. The second episode rated stronger than the premiere with an average of 1.375 million viewers tuning in.

The third episode managed to rate very well with 1.275 million viewers while the fourth episode fared well with 1.235 against the season premiere of Prison Break. The fifth episode only managed 1.156 million viewers, the lowest ratings for an episode of the show, although the program remained the highest-rating show in its timeslot. The sixth episode picked up slightly in viewers from the previous week with 1.192 million tuning in. The seventh episode grew in ratings as the penultimate episode, picking up to average 1.307 million viewers for the night. The eighth and final episode achieved the highest ratings for Summer Heights High with a total of 1.512 million viewers watching the concluding episode to the series.

Summer Heights High was the third most-downloaded ABC vodcast in 2007, with 1.2 million downloads in total.

=== Accolades ===
The series was nominated for both Most Outstanding Comedy Program and Most Popular Light Entertainment Program at the Logie Awards of 2008, winning the former. Lilley also won Most Popular Actor, and received nominations for Most Outstanding Actor and the Gold Logie Award for Most Popular Personality on Australian Television for his work on the series. Summer Heights High won the award for Best Television Comedy at the 2008 Australian Film Institute Awards, with Lilley also winning Best Performance in a Television Comedy and the Byron Kennedy Award for outstanding creative enterprise. Stuart McDonald won Best Direction in a TV Comedy Series at the Australian Directors Awards in 2008.

Summer Heights High was nominated for Best Television Theme, as well as Best Music for a Television Series, at the 2008 Screen Music Awards; it lost in both categories to Underbelly. The first episode of Summer Heights High was nominated for the Best Comedy award at the Banff World Television Festival in 2008, losing to Extras.

=== Controversies ===
The series is renowned for its controversial portrayal of such issues as mental disabilities, homophobia, sexual abuse, and racism.

The Herald Sun reported that parents and some teachers have considered the possibility that the show is influencing children to misbehave at school. Students were reportedly imitating Jonah and Ja'mie, repeating lines that were bullying, racist, and homophobic. Education Union branch president Mary Bluett stated in response that the show was "clearly tongue-in-cheek".

After episode three, in which a character called Annabel dies after taking ecstasy, the family of Annabel Catt, a girl who died taking drugs at the 2007 Good Vibrations Festival in Sydney, complained that the program had been lampooning Annabel's death. ABC apologised to the family, stating that the situation was purely coincidental and assured them that the filming of the episode in question had been completed eleven days before her daughter's death. ABC thereafter began to display a message before each episode stating that there is no link between the series' characters and people in real life.

A writer for the 2000 Network Ten series Sit Down, Shut Up claimed that Lilley had borrowed ideas for characters and plots from the series including the school name and aspects of the Mr G character.

In response to the George Floyd protests, Summer Heights High was one of several of Lilley's series that Netflix removed from its streaming service due to the use of blackface and brownface in the portrayal of characters. Writing for The Guardian, Seini F. Taumoepeau called Lilley's Jonah character a "racist construct" who did not accurately represent Tongans. The creators of the 2004 ABC TV documentary series Our Boys stated that Lilley drew inspiration for the Jonah character from their work. The subject of Our Boys recalled being "absolutely embarrassed, full of hate, angry and exploited" by the "racist" Jonah character that was based on him. The series' director, as well as a teacher at Canterbury Boys High School also felt that the character "exploited" the Tongan students who Lilley had met while visiting the school after seeing Our Boys on television in 2004.

=== Cultural impact ===
Responding to suggestions there could be a second series, Lilley said in June 2008 that he had yet to decide what to do next as he had not considered writing further episodes: "it was always a one-off thing". Lilley has since developed two spin-offs from Summer Heights High: Ja'mie: Private School Girl, which premiered in 2013 and focused on the character of Ja'mie King, and Jonah from Tonga, which continued the story of Jonah Takalua and premiered in 2014.
