= Big Bite =

- Genre: Sketch comedy
- Directed by: Adam Brannigan
- Starring: Chris Lilley; Andrew O'Keefe; Andrew Dyer; Jo Gill; Richard Pyros; Rebecca De Unamuno; Melissa Madden-Gray; Kate McCartney; Jake Stone
- Country of origin: Australia
- Original language: English
- No. of seasons: 1
- No. of episodes: 13

Production
- Running time: 22 minutes

Original release
- Network: Seven Network
- Release: 8 May 2003 – 4 March 2004

Big Bite is an Australian sketch comedy television series which ran on the Seven Network from 8 May 2003 to 4 March 2004 in a prime time timeslot on Thursdays. Since the end of the series, episodes have been repeated on the Foxtel cable channel, The Comedy Channel and 7Two.

== Overview ==
Only moderately successful on its initial broadcast and despite an initially mixed reception, the show has gradually developed something of a cult following, due to having begun the careers of a number of now prominent performers, directors and writers. Andrew O'Keefe started his television career on the show and went on to host Deal or No Deal, Dragons' Den, The Rich List, Weekend Sunrise and The Chase Australia. Chris Lilley's character Mr G first appeared here; he subsequently appeared in Summer Heights High and released a novelty single.

Other performers on the show included improvisational comedian Rebecca De Unamuno, experimental theatre star Melissa Madden Gray (now known for her cabaret character 'Meow Meow'), Kate McCartney (who would go on to star in The Katering Show and Get Krack!n), Richard Pyros (today a member of The Sydney Theatre Company's 'Residents' acting ensemble) and Jake Stone, former lead singer of popular Australian funk pop rock band Bluejuice. Other television personalities associated with the show included The Comedy Channel presenter Cameron Knight, comedian Charlie Pickering and actor Charlie Clausen. Many of the actors from this series would later appear on The Hamish and Andy Show.

Regular cast member Tristan Jepson, who wrote and played Tom Gleisner in the show's acclaimed parody of The Panel, committed suicide at the age of 26 in late 2004 after suffering from clinical depression. During the television broadcast of the 2005 Australian Film Institute Awards, he was honoured among the roll call of performers to have died in the previous year.

The show's co-creators included Andrew Jones and head writer Rick Kalowski, who have gone to success as a sought-after writing team. The show's directors included Ted Emery (Fast Forward, The Micallef Program, Kath & Kim) and Matthew Saville (Noise, We Can Be Heroes, The King).

Big Bite was nominated for Best Television Comedy Series at the 2003 Australian Film Institute Awards.

== Media release ==
A two-DVD set of the entire series (thirteen half-hour episodes) was released in Australia on 6 November 2006. This included the so-called 'lost' final episode of the series, which had not aired on Australian television during the series' original run.

== See also ==
- List of Australian television series
