= Richard Pyros =

British-Australian actor (born 1987)

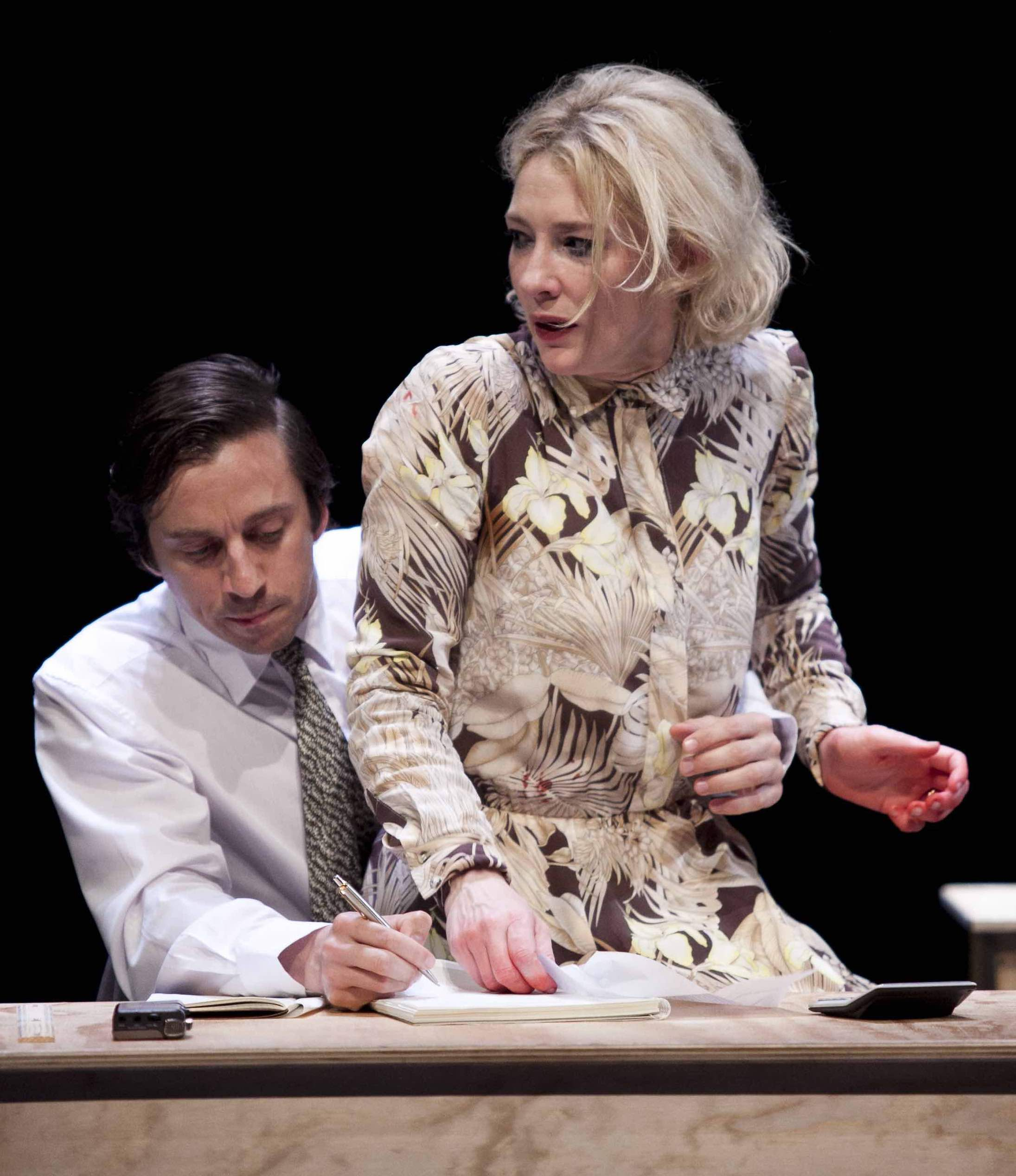
Pyros and Cate Blanchett in Big and Small at Théâtre de la Ville, Paris

Richard Pyros (born 7 April 1987) is a British-Australian actor, who first achieved fame in the hit Australian Channel Seven TV show, Big Bite (which was nominated for two AFI Awards) whilst still studying at drama school. Pyros was selected to create an array of characters including the memorably disheveled newsreader, 'Tee Pee Moses', and for his impersonation of personalities such as Rob Sitch, Michael Caton, Harry Potter and Detective Lennie Briscoe from Law & Order.

== Early life ==
Pyros was born in Liverpool, England, where he attended Dovedale Junior School and sang at Liverpool Cathedral as a chorister. After moving to Australia at age eleven, he attended Trinity Grammar School (Victoria) and became Head Chorister at St Paul's Cathedral, Melbourne. He then studied at the University of Melbourne where he graduated with a Bachelor of Arts (Criminology) and Bachelor of Music and went on to study acting (Bachelor of Dramatic Arts) at Victorian College of the Arts Drama School under Lindy Davies.

He was awarded The Irene Mitchell Award for Acting, VCA Drama School.

== Career ==
=== Film ===
Pyros appeared in the film Hacksaw Ridge (2016), directed by Mel Gibson, in the major role of Randall 'Teach' Fuller, alongside Andrew Garfield, Teresa Palmer, Sam Worthington, Vince Vaughn, Hugo Weaving, and Rachel Griffiths. He attended its world premiere at Venice International Film Festival in September 2016.

He starred in a feature film version of Hamlet (with Pyros playing the eponymous lead, Prince Hamlet), directed by Oscar Redding which had its world premiere at the Melbourne International Film Festival. His performance was critically acclaimed. Alison Croggon, writing in The Australian Newspaper said, 'crucially, Redding has a brilliant Hamlet in Richard Pyros. There are times when his performance lifts the hair on the back of your neck: this Hamlet might be mad, but the method in it has a profound legibility, and his corrosive intelligence shines through every gesture.'

His other film credits include No Budget by Christopher Stollery (official selection, Palm Springs International Film Festival 2012), Noise by Matthew Saville (official selection, Sundance Film Festival 2007), In Your Dreams (Tropfest) by Greg Williams, and Is God a DJ by Ben Chessell.

=== Television ===
Pyros' TV appearances include the BBC Two/Netflix drama, Giri/Haji, ABC Television comedy, Fisk and as a regular in the Hulu historical comedy-drama series, The Great with Elle Fanning and Nicholas Hoult.

Pyros is an accomplished comedian and writer. Prior to attending drama school, he was a member of the comedy troupe 'Enter The Datsun' with Charlie Pickering, Michael Chamberlin and Charlie Clausen, writing and producing several television pilots and featuring in a number of Melbourne International Comedy Festivals.

Pyros' TV writing credits include BackBerner, Big Bite and Stand Up Australia! (Foxtel) writing material for host, Cameron Knight. He was also recently co-writer on the Seven Network show, Fam Time and created the series, Lessons for Life with Alan Mercedes with Charlie Clausen.

=== Theatre ===
Pyros has performed extensively in theatre, including Ivo van Hove's lauded Hedda Gabler for the Royal National Theatre, opposite Matt Smith in the world premiere of Anthony Neilson's play, Unreachable at London's Royal Court Theatre and with Michelle Terry in Three Sisters in the Sam Wanamaker Playhouse at Shakespeare's Globe.

He has performed with leading Australian theatre companies (including the Sydney Theatre Company, Belvoir, Bell Shakespeare Company and Malthouse Theatre), and around the world in countries such as England, Scotland, Ireland, Italy, France, Austria, Germany and China.

In 2007, Pyros toured his show, Gilgamesh to the Barbican Theatre, London for the world-renowned 'Bite' season, as well as to The Beijing Oriental Pioneer Theatre, The Shanghai Dramatic Arts Centre and the Sydney Opera House.

In 2012, Pyros was nominated for a Green Room Award for Best Actor, for his portrayal of Oedipus in Malthouse Theatre's version of Oedipus Rex, On the Misconception of Oedipus, directed by Matthew Lutton. He was beaten by acclaimed actor, Colin Friels. He appeared in the Belvoir production of Summerfolk by Maxim Gorky in November 2020, and in 2022 sang the role of Hannibal in Victorian Opera (Melbourne)'s production of Kurt Weill and Bertolt Brecht's Happy End, also directed by Matthew Lutton.

Pyros was recently seen as Oberon/Theseus in Bell Shakespeare's, A Midsummer Night's Dream at Sydney Opera House, directed by Peter Evans and his performance was critically acclaimed, the Sydney Morning Herald noting, 'Pyros flourishes, casting spells with the rapture of the “little western flower/Before milk-white, now purple with love’s wound” and “I know a bank where the wild thyme blows” speeches. These are like moments when a violin soars above an orchestra in a concerto.'

=== Opera ===
Pyros has directed two operas, an immersive Hänsel und Gretel by Engelbert Humperdinck at the Bussey Building, Peckham (South London) and Henry Purcell's Dido and Aeneas at Kings Place, London. In 2023, he directed 'Chopin's Piano', for which he was also co-writer, adapting from the book of the same name by Paul Kildea. 'Chopin's Piano' toured to all the major concert halls around Australia.

== Career highlights ==
From 2009–2012, Pyros was a member of the resident acting ensemble at Sydney Theatre Company, selected by then Co-Artistic Directors, Cate Blanchett and Andrew Upton. In 2012, Pyros performed as Cate Blanchett's boyfriend, Alf in the award-winning production, Gross und Klein (Big and Small) by Botho Strauss adapted by Martin Crimp and directed by Benedict Andrews, which toured from Sydney to Paris, London, Vienna and Recklinghausen. His performance was described as, 'Pyros matched Blanchett blow-for-blow, in a scintillating, tour de force, acting matchup of heavyweight champions.'

== Selected Filmography ==
=== Film ===
- Noise (2007) as Carter
- Hamlet (aka The Tragedy of Hamlet, Prince of Denmark) (2007) as Hamlet
- In Your Dreams (2008) as Jim
- No Budget (2013) as Richard
- Is God a DJ as DJ God
- Hacksaw Ridge (2016) as Randall 'Teach' Fuller
- The Big Fix (upcoming film) (2027) (Netflix - Forthcoming) as Edward

=== Television ===
- Big Bite as 'Tee Pee Moses & various characters
- Giri/Haji (2019)
- The Yearly with Charlie Pickering (2020)
- The Weekly with Charlie Pickering (2021)
- Fisk (2021)
- The Great (2020-23) as Count Raskolnikov
- Kangaroo Beach (2024)
- Gnomes (2026)
