= Jonah from Tonga =

Australian television series

- Genre: Sitcom; Mockumentary; Comedy
- Created by: Chris Lilley
- Written by: Chris Lilley
- Directed by: Chris Lilley; Stuart McDonald
- Starring: Chris Lilley
- Theme music composer: Chris Lilley
- Composer: John Foreman
- Country of origin: Australia
- Original language: English
- No. of seasons: 1
- No. of episodes: 6

Production
- Executive producers: Laura Waters; Chris Lilley
- Producers: Laura Waters; Chris Lilley
- Production locations: The Grange P-12 College, Hoppers Crossing, Melbourne, Australia
- Cinematography: Nick Gregoric
- Editor: Ian Carmichael
- Running time: 26–27 minutes
- Production companies: Princess Pictures; ABC; HBO

Original release
- Network: ABC iview
- Release: 2 May – 4 May 2014
- Network: ABC1
- Release: 7 May – 11 June 2014

Related
- Summer Heights High

Jonah from Tonga (Tongan: Siōnā pe Tonga) is an Australian television mockumentary sitcom miniseries written by and starring comedian Chris Lilley. The mockumentary series follows Jonah Takalua, a rebellious 14-year-old Australian boy of Tongan descent portrayed by Lilley. The character had been introduced in Lilley's 2007 series Summer Heights High. At the conclusion of that series, Jonah was expelled from Summer Heights High School. In this series, his father, Rocky Takalua, has sent him back to his homeland of Tonga to live with his uncle and their family in order to get Jonah's life back on track. The series was highly controversial for its use of brownface and ethnic stereotypes.

The six-part series was produced by Princess Pictures and Chris Lilley in conjunction with the Australian Broadcasting Corporation, and screened on ABC1 in Australia, HBO in America, and BBC Three in the UK. In New Zealand Māori Television screened the first episode on 29 July 2017, but then withdrew later episodes due to protests. The entire series was available for streaming online for one weekend from 2 May to 4 May on BBC iPlayer and ABC iview, before starting a six-week run on ABC1 on 7 May 2014 and from 8 May on BBC Three. This was a first for a major Australian TV production. The series itself was a "ratings disaster" for both the ABC and BBC. It was later announced that the entire series would screen at select cinemas in several Australian cities followed by a Q and A with Chris Lilley. These events were subsequently cancelled, with refunds given and the website created to promote them removed.

== Production ==
On 27 November 2013, Lilley confirmed that he would be bringing back Jonah Takalua (Summer Heights High) for a new show titled Jonah from Tonga in 2014.

Melbourne-based production company Princess Pictures and Chris Lilley produced the series with Australian Broadcasting Corporation and HBO. Parts of the show are filmed at The Grange P-12 College, a western suburbs school in Melbourne.

== Characters ==
Jonah's family

- Chris Lilley as Jonah Takalua, the main character of the show. He previously appeared in Summer Heights High.
- Tama Tauali'i as Moses Takalua, Jonah's younger brother who has a talent for singing. Along with Jonah, he is a member of Fobba-licious.
- Isaia Noa as Rocky Takalua, Jonah's father. Rocky was previously portrayed by Tovia Matiasi in Summer Heights High.
- Linda Horan as Aunty Grace, Jonah's aunt, who he shows affection for.
- Jane Reupena-Niko as Melody, Jonah's cousin, whom he finds attractive and attempts to date.
- Eigawe Hunt as Mary Takalua, Jonah's sister whom he does not get along with, and frequently mocks her for being overweight.
- Tevita Manu as Uncle Mamafu, Jonah's uncle, who decides that Jonah can no longer live with him on Tonga.

Holy Cross High School staff

- Doug Bowles as Mr Joseph, the teacher in charge of Lazarus House. He has difficulty teaching Jonah, which often leads to violence. He later retires due to the Catholic Education Office deeming that Lazarus House is unsatisfactory.
- Uli Latukefu as Mr Fonua aka "Kool Kris", a youth worker who encourages the Fobba-licious crew to enter the Feel Da Beat competition.
- Meaghan Butler as Miss Hunt, a young teacher at Holy Cross High School whom all the boys find attractive.
- Dorothy Adams as Sister Monica, a naive but kindly administration officer at the school in charge of the sick bay.

Other school students

- Jason Moleli as Manu, Fobba-licious member.
- Lafaele Tauali'i as Israel, Fobba-licious member.
- Tana Laasia as Sonny, Fobba-licious member.
- Ilanna and Peggy, Fobba-licious members.
- Bryce Padovan as Graydon, Redhead student (“ranga”), Mary's boyfriend, the school captain and intense enemy of Jonah. The two of whom frequently get into fights.

Garingal Juvenile Justice Centre

- Belinda Sharp as Therese Cooper, an officer at the Juvenile Centre.
- Mose Mose as Kevin, Jonah's fat cell mate at the Juvenile Centre whom he finds boring.
- Braydan Pittman (now widely known as rapper 'SESK') as Jarrod, one of the Aboriginal boys at the prison that disrespects Jonah. Jonah says that he is a cockhead and always goes into arguments.

== Reception ==
The series received mixed reviews, attracting criticism both for its portrayal of Tongans and for Lilley's use of brownface make-up. The series was poorly received by Tongans in Australia, and several organisations in the United States criticised HBO's decision to air it. Morgan Godfery, writing in The Guardian, described Takalua as Lilley's "most endearing character", but said that he had made Polynesians "collateral damage on [his] quest to critique racism". Godfery also suggested that because not all viewers could "identify Lilley's purpose", he was "in essence, acting out a modern minstrel show". Giles Hardie, writing for The New Daily, described the show as "quite blatantly racist – playing on the cultural traits and responses to an ethnic community", but "hitting a variety of ethnicities and in doing so lumping us all in together". However, Hardie also noted that Lilley was "one of a handful of comedians in the world" who "force society to laugh in recognition at an unacknowledged reality and, while it laughs, to engage in some healthy introspection", and concluded that the series was not "creating the stereotype", but "challenging an existing one that is found in society".

In 2017, the series was scheduled to air on Māori Television in New Zealand, however the board of the station cancelled the broadcast, saying the show perpetuated negative stereotypes of Pacific people. The creators of the 2004 ABC TV documentary series Our Boys stated that Lilley drew inspiration for the Jonah character from their work. The subject of Our Boys recalled being "absolutely embarrassed, full of hate, angry and exploited" by the "racist" Jonah character that was based on him. The series' director, as well as a teacher at Canterbury Boys High School, also felt that the character "exploited" the Tongan students who Lilley had met while visiting the school after seeing Our Boys on television in 2004.

== Episodes ==
| No. | Title | Directed by | Written by | Original release date | Australian viewers |
|---|---|---|---|---|---|
| 1 | "Episode 1" | Chris Lilley and Stuart McDonald | Chris Lilley | 7 May 2014 | 414,000 |
Jonah was expelled from Summer Heights High School during Year 8 and is sent back to Tonga to live with his uncle. No-one likes him there because he is violent, swears, tells lies and graffitis. Months later, his father Rocky and Aunty Grace visit and take 14-year-old Jonah back to Australia to live with his family in Sydney. He is pleased, because he was bored in Tonga. Jonah becomes a Year 9 student at the Catholic Holy Cross High School in suburban Sydney. He quickly forms a new Pacific Islander school gang, Fobba-licious, and causes trouble for many students and teachers. He has a particular disliking for ginger kids, whom he calls rangas. He has to attend classes at Lazarus House, a unit at the school for students who have behavioural problems.
| 2 | "Episode 2" | Chris Lilley and Stuart McDonald | Chris Lilley | 14 May 2014 | 287,000 |
Jonah and the Fobba-licious boys are forced to meet with youth worker Kool Kris after the gang made videos of themselves bullying younger kids and uploaded them to YouTube. Several of the male students, including Jonah, dance individually in front of the rest of the students - and he trades insults with a ginger student, Graydon. Fobba-licious weld Graydon's locker shut, then he grabs Jonah's younger brother, Moses. Fobba-licious gather Year 7 ginger kids from different classrooms under false pretences. They enclose them within two goals and film them while trying to make one of them eat dog feces. A teacher sees what they are doing and stops them.
| 3 | "Episode 3" | Chris Lilley and Stuart McDonald | Chris Lilley | 21 May 2014 | 348,000 |
Rocky grounds Jonah for bullying the ginger kids. However, Jonah and the 'Fobba-licious' boys escape and go to the ten-pin bowling alley. Jonah papier-machés his cousin Melody. Fobba-licious' counselling session with Kool Kris leads to the boys taking part in the 'Feel Da Beat' song competition. An older gang called the Soldierz lend Jonah and Moses a machete.
| 4 | "Episode 4" | Chris Lilley and Stuart McDonald | Chris Lilley | 28 May 2014 | 240,000 |
Jonah humiliates Mr Joseph in front of the school inspectors. Moses gets the machete out of his locker and shows it to the rest of Fobba-licious. Fobba-licious go to the bowling alley. They try to steal the alley's golden bowling ball (which they believe is worth $10,000) by threatening the receptionist with the machete. Security guards seize Jonah and Moses. All five are arrested and taken to a youth detention center. Jonah is kept in, while the others are bailed.
| 5 | "Episode 5" | Chris Lilley and Stuart McDonald | Chris Lilley | 4 June 2014 | 289,000 |
Jonah's imprisonment bring new opponents, including Aboriginal inmates - as well as some unexpected allies, including correctional officer Therese. He forms a prison gang called Juve-licious. Rocky, Kool Kris and Mr Joseph visit Jonah.
| 6 | "Episode 6" | Chris Lilley and Stuart McDonald | Chris Lilley | 11 June 2014 | 246,000 |
Jonah entertains his mates with all his stories of prison life but will Jonah still find himself behind bars with other bad boys or will he prove he can be a real man?

== Home video releases ==
| Series | Set details | DVD release dates | | Special features |
| Series | Set details | Region 2 | Region 4 | Special features |
|---|---|---|---|---|
| Jonah from Tonga | 2 discs; 6 episodes | 16 June 2014 | 28 May 2014 | Deleted scenes; Bloopers; Behind-the scenes featurettes |

== Awards and nominations ==
| Year | Award | Category | Recipients and nominees | Result |
|---|---|---|---|---|
| 2015 | Logie Awards | Most Popular Actor | Chris Lilley | Nominated |
