= Logie Award for Most Popular Actor =

- Country: Australia
- Presented by: TV Week
- First award: 1977
- Currently held by: Sam Neill (2023)

Highlights
- Most awards: Paul Cronin and Martin Sacks (5)
- Website: www.tvweeklogieawards.com.au

The Silver Logie for Most Popular Actor is an award presented annually at the Australian TV Week Logie Awards. The award recognises the popularity of an actor in an Australian program.

It was first awarded at the 19th Annual TV Week Logie Awards, held in 1977 when the award category was originally called Most Popular Australian Lead Actor. It was later renamed Most Popular Actor and briefly Best Actor (2016–2017). For the 2018 ceremony, the award category name was reverted to Most Popular Actor.

The winner and nominees of Most Popular Actor are chosen by the public through an online voting survey on the TV Week website. Paul Cronin and Martin Sacks hold the record for the most wins, with five each, followed by Grant Dodwell, Craig McLachlan and Hugh Sheridan with three wins each.

== Winners and nominees ==
Key	Meaning
‡	Indicates the winning actor

Year	Nominees	Program(s)	Network	Ref
1977	Martin Vaughan‡	Power Without Glory	ABC	
1978	Paul Cronin‡	The Sullivans	Nine Network	
1979	Paul Cronin‡	The Sullivans	Nine Network	
1980	Paul Cronin‡	The Sullivans	Nine Network	
1981	Peter Adams‡	Cop Shop	Seven Network	
1982	Paul Cronin‡	The Sullivans	Nine Network	
1983	Paul Cronin‡	The Sullivans	Nine Network	
1984	Grant Dodwell‡	A Country Practice	Seven Network	
1985	Grant Dodwell‡	A Country Practice	Seven Network	
1986	Grant Dodwell‡	A Country Practice	Seven Network	
1987	Peter O'Brien‡	Neighbours	Network Ten	
1988	Jason Donovan‡	Neighbours	Network Ten	
1989	Craig McLachlan‡	Neighbours	Network Ten	
1990	Craig McLachlan‡	Neighbours	Network Ten	
1991	Craig McLachlan‡	Home and Away	Seven Network	
1992	Bruce Samazan‡	E Street	Network Ten	
1993	Gary Sweet‡	Police Rescue	ABC TV	
1994	Gary Sweet‡	Police Rescue	ABC TV	
1995	Dieter Brummer‡	Home and Away	Seven Network	
1996	Dieter Brummer‡	Home and Away	Seven Network	
1997	Martin Sacks‡	Blue Heelers	Seven Network	
1998	Martin Sacks‡	Blue Heelers	Seven Network	
1998	Colin Friels	Water Rats	Nine Network	
1998	Jesse Spencer	Neighbours	Network Ten	
1998	Nic Testoni	Home and Away	Seven Network	
1998	John Wood	Blue Heelers	Seven Network	
1999	Martin Sacks‡	Blue Heelers	Seven Network	
1999	Colin Friels	Water Rats	Nine Network	
1999	Jesse Spencer	Neighbours	Network Ten	
1999	John Wood	Blue Heelers	Seven Network	
2000	Martin Sacks‡	Blue Heelers	Seven Network	
2000	Colin Friels	Water Rats	Nine Network	
2000	Peter Phelps	Stingers	Nine Network	
2000	John Wood	Blue Heelers	Seven Network	
2001	Martin Sacks‡	Blue Heelers	Seven Network	
2001	Daniel MacPherson	Neighbours	Network Ten	
2001	William McInnes	SeaChange	ABC TV	
2001	John Wood	Blue Heelers	Seven Network	
2002	Peter Phelps‡	Stingers	Nine Network	
2002	Samuel Johnson	The Secret Life of Us	Network Ten	
2002	Ryan Kwanten	Home and Away	Seven Network	
2002	Erik Thomson	All Saints	Seven Network	
2002	John Wood	Blue Heelers	Seven Network	
2003	Erik Thomson‡	All Saints	Seven Network	
2003	Beau Brady	Home and Away	Seven Network	
2003	Samuel Johnson	The Secret Life of Us	Network Ten	
2003	Myles Pollard	McLeod's Daughters	Nine Network	
2003	John Wood	Blue Heelers	Seven Network	
2004	Aaron Jeffery‡	McLeod's Daughters	Nine Network	
2004	Beau Brady	Home and Away	Seven Network	
2004	Myles Pollard	McLeod's Daughters	Nine Network	
2004	Glenn Robbins	Kath & Kim	ABC TV	
2004	Erik Thomson	All Saints	Seven Network	
2005	John Wood‡	Blue Heelers	Seven Network	
2005	Beau Brady	Home and Away	Seven Network	
2005	Chris Hemsworth	Home and Away	Seven Network	
2005	Aaron Jeffery	McLeod's Daughters	Nine Network	
2005	Glenn Robbins	Kath & Kim	ABC TV	
2006	John Wood‡	Blue Heelers	Seven Network	
2006	Chris Hemsworth	Home and Away	Seven Network	
2006	Aaron Jeffery	McLeod's Daughters	Nine Network	
2006	Joel McIlroy	Home and Away	Seven Network	
2006	Glenn Robbins	Da Kath and Kim Code	ABC TV	
2007	Aaron Jeffery‡	McLeod's Daughters	Nine Network	
2007	Brendan Cowell	Love My Way	W. Channel	
2007	Mark Furze	Home and Away	Seven Network	
2007	John Howard	All Saints	Seven Network	
2007	Paul O'Brien	Home and Away	Seven Network	
2008	Chris Lilley‡	Summer Heights High	ABC1	
2008	Mark Furze	Home and Away	Seven Network	
2008	John Howard	All Saints	Seven Network	
2008	Paul O'Brien	Home and Away	Seven Network	
2008	Glenn Robbins	Kath & Kim	Seven Network	
2009	Todd Lasance‡	Home and Away	Seven Network	
2009	Gyton Grantley	Underbelly	Nine Network	
2009	Mark Priestley	All Saints	Seven Network	
2009	Ian Smith	Neighbours	Network Ten	
2009	Erik Thomson	Packed to the Rafters	Seven Network	
2010	Hugh Sheridan‡	Packed to the Rafters	Seven Network	
2010	Luke Jacobz	Home and Away	Seven Network	
2010	Todd Lasance	Home and Away	Seven Network	
2010	Ray Meagher	Home and Away	Seven Network	
2010	Erik Thomson	Packed to the Rafters	Seven Network	
2011	Hugh Sheridan‡	Packed to the Rafters	Seven Network	
2011	Michael Caton	Packed to the Rafters	Seven Network	
2011	Don Hany	Offspring	Network Ten	
2011	Don Hany	Tangle	Showcase	
2011	Callan Mulvey	Rush	Network Ten	
2011	Erik Thomson	Packed to the Rafters	Seven Network	
2012	Hugh Sheridan‡	Packed to the Rafters	Seven Network	
2012	Daniel MacPherson	Wild Boys	Seven Network	
2012	Ray Meagher	Home and Away	Seven Network	
2012	Eddie Perfect	Offspring	Network Ten	
2012	Erik Thomson	Packed to the Rafters	Seven Network	
2013	Steve Peacocke‡	Home and Away	Seven Network	
2013	Firass Dirani	House Husbands	Nine Network	
2013	Firass Dirani	The Straits	ABC1	
2013	Hugh Sheridan	Packed to the Rafters	Seven Network	
2013	Lachy Hulme	Howzat! Kerry Packer's War	Nine Network	
2013	Lachy Hulme	Beaconsfield	Nine Network	
2013	Lachy Hulme	Offspring	Network Ten	
2013	Matthew Le Nevez	Offspring	Network Ten	
2014	Chris Lilley‡	Ja'mie: Private School Girl	ABC1	
2014	Dan Ewing	Home and Away	Seven Network	
2014	Matthew Le Nevez	Offspring	Network Ten	
2014	Steve Peacocke	Home and Away	Seven Network	
2014	Hugh Sheridan	Packed to the Rafters	Seven Network	
2015	Steve Peacocke‡	Home and Away	Seven Network	
2015	Luke Arnold	INXS: Never Tear Us Apart	Seven Network	
2015	Chris Lilley	Jonah from Tonga	ABC	
2015	Craig McLachlan	The Doctor Blake Mysteries	ABC	
2015	Josh Thomas	Please Like Me	ABC2	
2016	Erik Thomson‡	800 Words	Seven Network	
2016	Firass Dirani	House Husbands	Nine Network	
2016	Craig McLachlan	The Doctor Blake Mysteries	ABC	
2016	Steve Peacocke	Home and Away	Seven Network	
2016	Josh Thomas	Please Like Me	ABC	
2017	Samuel Johnson‡	Molly	Seven Network	
2017	Erik Thomson	800 Words	Seven Network	
2017	Craig McLachlan	Deep Water	SBS	
2017	Craig McLachlan	The Doctor Blake Mysteries	ABC	
2017	Craig McLachlan	The Wrong Girl	Network Ten	
2017	Richard Roxburgh	Rake	ABC	
2017	Rodger Corser	Doctor Doctor	Nine Network	
2017	Rodger Corser	The Doctor Blake Mysteries	ABC	
2018	Ray Meagher‡	Home and Away	Seven Network	
2018	Aaron Jeffery	Underbelly Files: Chopper	Nine Network	
2018	Erik Thomson	800 Words	Seven Network	
2018	Luke McGregor	Rosehaven	ABC	
2018	Rodger Corser	Doctor Doctor	Nine Network	
2019	Luke McGregor‡	Rosehaven	ABC	
2019	Aaron Pedersen	Mystery Road	ABC	
2019	Guy Pearce	Jack Irish	ABC	
2019	Ray Meagher	Home and Away	Seven Network	
2019	Rodger Corser	Doctor Doctor	Nine Network	
2019	Ryan Moloney	Neighbours	Network Ten	
2022	Guy Pearce‡	Jack Irish	ABC	
2022	Bernard Curry	Wentworth - The Final Sentence	Foxtel	
2022	Hugo Weaving	Love Me	Binge/Foxtel	
2022	Ray Meagher	Home and Away	Seven Network	
2022	Rodger Corser	Doctor Doctor	Nine Network	
2022	Stephen Peacocke	RFDS	Seven Network	
2023	Sam Neill	The Twelve	Binge/Foxtel	
2023	James Stewart	Home and Away	Seven Network	
2023	Lincoln Younes	After the Verdict	Nine Network	
2023	Lincoln Younes	Last King of the Cross	Paramount+	
2023	Lincoln Younes	Barons	ABC	
2023	Mark Coles Smith	Mystery Road: Origin	ABC	
2023	Patrick Brammall	Colin From Accounts	Binge	
2023	Patrick Brammall	Summer Love	ABC	
2023	Ray Meagher	Home and Away	Seven Network	

== Multiple wins ==
Number	Actor
Wins
5	Paul Cronin
5	Martin Sacks
3	Grant Dodwell
3	Craig McLachlan
3	Hugh Sheridan
2	Gary Sweet
2	Dieter Brummer
2	Aaron Jeffery
2	John Wood
2	Chris Lilley
2	Steve Peacocke

== Programs with most awards ==
Wins	Program
7	Blue Heelers
5	The Sullivans
5	Home and Away
4	Neighbours
3	A Country Practice
3	Packed to the Rafters
