= Naughty Girl (Mr G song) =

Single by Mr G

from the album Summer Heights High (OST)
- Released: 1 March 2008 (Australia); 17 March 2008 (International)
- Recorded: 2007
- Length: 3:21
- Label: Virgin
- Songwriter(s): Chris Lilley
- Producer(s): Paul Mac

"Naughty Girl" is the first single from the 2007 television series Summer Heights High. It is performed by one of the show's leads, Mr G, portrayed by Chris Lilley as well as Kelly Dingledei, who plays Candice/Jessica in the show. The song appears on the musical's soundtrack, available from ABC Shops and iTunes.

== Background ==
The song featured in the Australian mockumentary school series Summer Heights High, following the death of one of the students at the school. The song is sung by Chris Lilley (Mr G), who starred as the three main characters in the programme.

== Track listing ==
CD single
Virgin (EMI) #5218992

1. "Naughty Girl"
2. "Naughty Girl" (Jessica's Addiction Remix)
3. "Naughty Girl" (Styalz Fuego Remix)
4. "Naughty Girl" (Paul Mac's Extended 12")
5. "Naughty Girl" (Cloud Club Remix)
6. "Naughty Girl" (a cappella)

== Music video ==
The music video for "Naughty Girl" was released on 17 March 2008. The video shows various people from Australia (including some of the cast of Summer Heights High) dancing and lip syncing to the words of the song.

== Charts ==
=== Weekly charts ===
Chart (2008)	Peak position
Australian ARIA Singles Chart	7
Australian ARIA Physical Singles Chart	1
Australian ARIA Australian Singles	1

=== Year-end charts ===
Chart (2008)	Position
Australian ARIA Year-End 100	76
