= Mr G =

- Big Bite / Summer Heights High character
- Chris Lilley as "Mr G" (2007)
- First appearance: "Episode 1" (Big Bite); 8 May 2003
- Last appearance: "Episode 8" (Summer Heights High); 24 October 2007
- Created by: Chris Lilley
- Portrayed by: Chris Lilley
- Spin-off(s): Logies (2008)

In-universe information
- Full name: Hellen Gregson
- Aliases: Mr G Greg; Mr Gregson
- Nickname: Mr G
- Gender: Male
- Occupation: Drama Teacher at Summer Heights High School
- Nationality: Australian
- Pet(s): Celine (Pet Chihuahua)

Hellen "Greg" Gregson, best known as Mr G, is a fictional character portrayed by Chris Lilley in the Australian mockumentary series Summer Heights High. The character also appeared in the sketch comedy series Big Bite.

== Storylines ==
Sometime prior to 1998, Mr G graduated from the Teachers' College of Macquarie University in Sydney, where he completed a Bachelor of Arts, majoring in the performing arts (music, drama and dance), and a Diploma of Education.

Mr G became a drama teacher at Summer Heights High in 1998, 9 years prior to 2007.

He first appears in Big Bite set in 2003 as a Drama Teacher, in which Mr G hosts the annual Rock Eisteddfod Challenge; he calls the show 'Vietwow' which is based around Australia's involvement in The Vietnam War and brings home an award for the performance.

Later on Mr G is asked to host a performance for the opening of the new school pool, which is being opened by Olympic swimmer Ian Thorpe. After being denied several ideas he settles on a performance on the Sinking of the Titanic.

Some years later in 2007 on Summer Heights High, Mr G is supporting Head of Drama Mrs Meredith Cotton with the upcoming school production of Anything Goes. He then brags about his life story in performing arts and discusses a typical drama class, where he incorporates his unique teaching style. He sees his role at the school to teach drama and dance to change lives, inspire students, and to encourage the students to dare to dream. Along with his loyal sidekick, science teacher, Mr Rodney Parsons, Mr G criticises and is frustrated by his superior Mrs Meredith Cotton, as well as complaining about the lack of funding and support given by the school's principal.

The Head of Drama, Mrs Meredith Cotton, had to go to New Zealand due to her mother suddenly falling very ill, and therefore Mr G was promoted to Acting Head of Drama, renaming his title as "Director of Performing Arts". Thrilled with the temporary promotion, he makes a few changes such as clearing-out Ms Cotton's desk and moving himself in, and walking around the school to pass on the news to students of his new role. He also gets support staff to do work for him, complains about noise from the gym, and requests teachers "under the umbrella of Performing Arts" to fill-in classes and duties he is too busy for; fellow teaching staff complain to the Principal about his now selfish and bossy demeanour. He also unveils plans for a new performing arts centre with a 10,000-seat theatre complex that will require the demolition of demountable classrooms used by the special education students. Mr G then cancels the school production Anything Goes with plans to write his own "better show".

After learning of the death of a Year 11 student, Annabelle Dickson, due to an overdose of ecstasy, Mr G uses the event as his inspiration for the school's new production.

The rigorous auditions for "Annabelle Dickson: The Musical" began, with Mr G casting the net wide. He conducts psychological evaluations on the interested students before traditional auditions and later excludes all of the special-ed students. After call-backs, Mr G splits the students into two groups to deliver the news of who is through.

Mr G and his cast are rehearsing for "Annabelle Dickson: The Musical". But the principal, Ms Murray thinks that he's been excluding some of the special-ed students from the musical. Mr G doesn't like the idea and is intrigued when Rodney explains a story about a school that had a mother find human faeces in one of the special-ed rooms therefore making the health department kicking the special-ed students out. Mr G tries this but fails as the school cleaner steam cleans the room in the morning.

"Annabelle Dickson: The Musical" is falling apart just 10 days before opening night; Annabelle Dickson's parents refuse to have the musical focus on their daughter, resulting in Mr G re-working it into "Mr G: The Musical" to tell his life story with a later reference to an Annabelle-like character; the school can't afford his arena seating; his lead actor quits and is replaced by Toby, a child with Down syndrome; and then Mr G's dog, Celine, is hit and by a car. It is later revealed that Celine survived the car crash, and life returns to normal for Mr G.

Ms Murray tells Mr G that Mrs Cotton is returning to the school as Head of Drama. She further aggravates him by saying that drama is a "small department" and she cannot afford the arena seating for the musical. He sees himself as undervalued by the school and insults Ms Murray before handing in his letter of resignation and storming out of her office. He uses the PA system to force his views on the school, organises his own farewell card and cancels the musical before making his drama students perform a guard of honour as he walks out of the school gate for the last time. Mr G is then later shown driving outside the school repeatedly in his car, asking students from his car window if his resignation is impacting the school. Margaret sees him from her office and comes out to speak with him in his car, where she asks him to reconsider his resignation and offers him the title of 'Creative Coordinator of the Drama Department' which he calls insulting. When Margaret tells him the musical is still going ahead with Meredith directing, Mr G decides to return to Summer Heights to solely focus on directing the show (and not teach).

Mr G announces the opening night of "Mr G: The Musical" over the PA system and gives Toby extra rehearsals for his role as Mr G. Rodney shows up with his German shepherd, Arnold, to replace Celine in the show. On opening night, Toby is dubbed over by Mr G. Jessica and Celine's death scene then performed with Mr G publicly shaming Rodney as causing Celine's death. Mr G then appears on stage to make an announcement before the finale that he will stay at the school after all and continuing teaching. He then tells Toby to leave the stage, taking his place for the finale number "The Smell of Life". During the song, a pre-planned banner appears behind announcing his comeback to teaching.

Three weeks later on the last day of term, Mr G declared the musical a "hit" despite poor ticket sales leading to only one show being performed. He took the offer of the 'Creative Coordinator of the Drama Department' title and has moved his office and drama room to one of the former special education portable classrooms, which he calls his 'Gregson Performing Arts Centre', after most of the special education students were removed from the school because Mr G again put faeces on the floor of the classroom. Toby remains at the school on an integration program. Mr G is then shown preparing a time capsule, containing mostly items about himself, which will buried near the classroom and dug up in 100 years time. The capsule is then shown being buried, with staff and students looking on. Celine is then revealed to be still alive after being hit by the car, but is now forced to use a wheelchair for her back legs. He kept it a secret until now because he didn't want the disabled dog in the musical. At the school gate, Mr G can't control Celine on the footpath near the road and wishes goodbye to students over a portable amplifier.

Mr G appeared at the 50th Annual 2008 TV Week Logie Awards performing songs from "Mr G the Musical" along with other characters from the series.

== Biography ==
Mr G is an effeminate thirty-six-year-old drama teacher at Summer Heights High. Like his creator, Mr G mentions that he graduated from the Teachers' College of Macquarie University in Sydney, where he completed a Bachelor of Arts, where he mentions majoring in the performing arts (music, drama and dance), and a Diploma of Education. Mr G not only believes that he is an incredibly talented and well-liked teacher, but that his students also share his intense passion for drama and performance. He is in constant conflict with himself and other members of staff, particularly the school principal. His self-centred attitude causes him to frequently lose his temper with the students, and he is hostile to the disabled students being involved, under the belief that they will damage the quality of his musical. It is clear that he is unaware that his own perception of his teaching abilities is not shared by most students. He has written several musicals for the school, including "Tsunamarama", based on the events of the 2004 Asian tsunami, set to the music of Bananarama. The character regularly featured on the Australian television series Big Bite.

On the show Summer Heights High, Mr G wrote a musical based on the death of a student, Annabel Dickson, from a drug overdose. The musical was originally called Annabel Dickson: The Musical and portrayed Annabel as a promiscuous drug addict. However, it is established early on that Mr G had no direct dealings with Annabel. Due to Annabel's parents being unhappy with the script, the focus of the musical changes from being about Annabel to Mr G and how he deals with Annabel's demise. As the show progresses, the musical ultimately becomes the story of how Mr G tried to help Annabel with her drug habit, with the character of Mr G being a 'Jesus-like figure'.

One of the main songs from the musical was "Naughty Girl", a song told through the voice of Mr G, which describes Annabel's plight. Other songs include "She's a Slut and She Knows It", "My Name is Mr G" and "Bummer Heights High". In the performance as well as in the official CD single release, Annabel's name was changed to Jessica.

One of Mr. G's desires is to construct a lavish performing arts centre named after himself. Since he has trouble convincing the administration to fund this endeavour, he decides that proceeds from "Mr. G: The Musical" are to be directed toward its construction. The enormous building which would likely eclipse the school in height would be able to host arena spectaculars. Despite the loyalty of his friend, science teacher Rodney Parsons, there will not be a room for dramatic sciences.

Greg is also in charge of school evacuations. He states that "I like to use my acting skills to create the drama of the situation". Another useful fact is that he has an above average-sense of smell, which enables him to control certain behaviours amongst the students. He regularly "smells" pupils to detect alcohol, graffiti pens, and cannabis.

Mr G's attitude towards his fellow staff members and to his students is often controlling; he enjoys taking authority as (temporary) Director of Performing Arts. He is sensitive about his colleagues touching his property and has frequently used a label maker to emphasise this. His apparent excitement in the mornings contrasts that of his colleagues—"Coffee, coffee, coffee before we teachy, teachy!". His constant excitement for the subject of drama has been a frequent comic point of Summer Heights High as well as his undying love for Celine, his pet dog, and his never ending commitment to his musicals—"It's G time, not free time!".

== Discography ==
=== Singles ===
List of singles, with selected chart positions
Title	Year	Chart positions	Certification
Title	Year	AUS	Certification
"Naughty Girl"	2008	7	ARIA: Gold
