= Mary Bluett =

Australian trade unionist

- Born: 12 March 1951 (age 75); Paddington, New South Wales
- Occupations: Teacher and trade unionist

Mary Bluett (born 12 March 1951) is an Australian trade unionist and the former president of the Victorian branch of the Australian Education Union (AEU). In 1974, Bluett became a branch representative of the Victorian Secondary Teachers Association (VSTA). The next year, she became a member of the VSTA's Central Committee. In 1982, she became the vice president of the VSTA, before being elected as the president of the VSTA in 1994. The VSTA ultimately merged with two other Victorian teachers unions to become the Victorian branch of the AEU. Bluett became the Victorian AEU's first vice president. She became the president of the AEU's Victorian Branch in 1998.

On 19 July 2012, Fair Work Australia allowed the AEU to ballot teachers' aides and other support staff as to whether they would join a planned strike in September 2012 surrounding pay claims by the government of Ted Baillieu. Bluett called the decision historic, saying that "we have negotiated in the case of teachers for over nine months, and it's not unreasonable to take the action that we're forced to". The ballot passed with over 97% approval, with Bluett remarking that "education support staff remain the lowest paid in Victorian schools and receive little or no recognition of their skills, experience and the crucial role they play".

The planned strike took place on 5 September 2012. Bluett said that negotiations with the Victorian government broke down on 9 April, and called a proposed 2.5% pay rise insulting. She also said that government proposals included deliberately provocative ideas such as sacking the bottom five percent of teachers and making teachers undergo professional development during school holidays, among other things. Six days later, Bluett announced her intention to step down as AEU Victoria president on 31 December 2012, the end of her term, saying that "the union has grown enormously in strength, which is something I'm really proud of".
