= We Can Be Heroes: Finding the Australian of the Year =

2005 Australian television mockumentary series

- Genre: Mockumentary; Sitcom
- Created by: Chris Lilley
- Starring: Chris Lilley
- Narrated by: Jennifer Byrne
- Theme music composer: Bryony Marks
- Country of origin: Australia
- Original language: English
- No. of episodes: 6

Production
- Executive producer: Bruce Kane
- Producer: Laura Waters
- Running time: 30 minutes
- Production company: Princess Pictures

Original release
- Network: ABC
- Release: 27 July – 31 August 2005

Related
- Summer Heights High; Ja'mie: Private School Girl; Angry Boys

We Can Be Heroes: Finding the Australian of the Year (mostly known as The Nominees outside of Australia) is an Australian mockumentary miniseries starring and created and co-written by Chris Lilley and Ryan Shelton and directed by Matthew Saville.

It follows the story of five unique Australians (all portrayed by Lilley), who have each made a significant achievement and been nominated by friends and family for the Australian of the Year award.

It premiered on 27 July 2005, and concluded on 31 August 2005. It was shown on the ABC on Wednesday nights at 9:00pm. There are six episodes, with each episode running for 30 minutes. The show was broadcast in the United Kingdom on FX, in the United States on the Sundance Channel, and in Canada on The Comedy Network. In Australia, The Comedy Channel aired the series as part of their Aussie Gold block hosted by Frank Woodley.

The show won a Logie Award for most outstanding comedy and Chris Lilley won the Best New Talent Logie for his performance in the show.

== Characters ==
All of the Australian of the Year nominees are played by Chris Lilley.

=== Daniel Sims ===
Daniel Sims lives in Dunt, South Australia, which is the only fictional location in We Can Be Heroes and is based on the town of Lara, Victoria. He is 17 years old, and largely a parody of rural, country people. He lives with his mother; his hearing-impaired twin brother, Nathan; and his two younger brothers and a sister. His father died in a car crash many years ago.

Daniel was nominated for Australian of the Year for donating one of his eardrums to his near-deaf brother, Nathan (also played by Lilley). As he does not know sign language, Daniel uses different methods to talk to Nathan, such as screaming at him, or using coloured cards. These cards have different meanings, including "change the Xbox game" or "piss off".

Both Daniel and Nathan, as well as their friends, enjoy rapping and beatboxing. After his hearing was partially restored, Nathan's beatboxing skills improved greatly.

Daniel was a winner for the state finals, but he did not want to wear a suit or make a speech. However, he later changed his mind when he discovered he would be able to legally buy porn and fireworks in Canberra.

Daniel and his family, along with his mother's boyfriend, regularly feature in Lilley's series Angry Boys, which highlights the lives of the twins.

=== Ja'mie King ===
Ja'mie King lives in the North Shore of Sydney, New South Wales, but was born in South Africa. Ja'mie is a 16-year-old girl and has sponsored 85 Sudanese children for Global Vision (a fictional organisation parodying World Vision International), which gave her the National Record. Due to her work of raising money, Global Vision decided to make her the 'face' of their organisation. Ja'mie also does the 40 Hour Famine twice a week which she says not only helps raise money but "keeps [her] looking hot".

Ja'mie is the 'popular' girl in Year 11 at Hilford Girls' Grammar School, a private school on Sydney's North Shore. She and her group of three friends are very superficial, caring only about their looks. Ja'mie's friends all support her claims to have been in the finals of "Dolly Covergirl of the Year". Ja'mie serves as a parody of the stereotypical wealthy and snobby North Shore private school girl. Ja'mie and her friends enjoy sleepovers and gossiping, as well as modelling and the arts.

She is even featured in a school assembly to promote the work of Global Vision where she makes the school repeat after her in the Sudanese language what Sonali told her when they parted at the Detention centre where Sonali is staying. "Balumbo Shamanaka" when translated in English says 'You are very beautiful girl'. She scolds the school for misusing their money telling them that each dollar they do not donate equals one dead child, and that they should convert their school oval into a "mass grave" because of the money the school accumulated from food sales at the canteen.

Two weeks before the Australian of the Year finals, Ja'mie is informed that a flood has hit 'her' village, killing all but two of her Sudanese children. She displays apparent displeasure and is shown to have a very short temper when she argues with the manager of Global Vision and then accuses her mother of not offering her support.

In the episodes, we are shown one of the Sudanese children she sponsored named Sonali. Sonali apparently has illegally entered Australia and is held at the Villawood Immigration Detention Centre. In one episode, Sonali apparently writes a letter to Ja'mie telling her that she is in Australia and asking Ja'mie to visit her. Ja'mie is sceptical at first but soon realises that this visit will bring a lot of media attention, so she invites one of her friends along because she 'is good at taking photos'. Ja'mie even takes Sonali along to Canberra for the finals and lends Sonali her Year 10 Formal dress to wear for the occasion.

Ja'mie appears in Chris Lilley's subsequent TV series Summer Heights High and Ja'mie: Private School Girl.

=== Pat Mullins ===
Pat Mullins lived in the suburb of Nollamara in Perth, Western Australia, was 47 years old, was married to Terry and was the mother of two children. As an adolescent, she developed skeletal dysplasia of the femur resulting in one leg being shorter than the other. In order to move around more quickly, she developed the ability to roll along the ground at high speeds.

Terry built Pat a training course, featuring various terrains and obstacles for her rolling. Her ambition was to roll from Perth to Uluru, although she experienced some injuries and setbacks during training, including having a gumnut lodged up her nose.

In the last episode, it was revealed that Pat died of liver cancer on 12 January 2006, 23 days after the announcement of Australian of the Year. She never completed her roll to Uluru.

=== Phil Olivetti ===
Phil Olivetti is the Queensland nominee, who in fact nominated himself for the award; he is a self-obsessed 37-year-old, from Bray Park in Brisbane. He used to work for the police force until he saved 9 children from an unsecured jumping castle that was about to crash into power lines. After that, he quit his job and tried to start a career in motivational speaking. He had plans to write an autobiography and sell merchandise. He soon became obsessive about winning the prestigious award, inviting a man on the judging panel to a barbecue to flaunt his Australian spirit and later attempt to bribe him unsuccessfully.

In the midst of his attempts to secure the award, he also tried to become involved in his son's Scouting troop through his motivational speaking course, which was based on how to deal with (unrealistic) emergency situations, such as escaping from Al Qaeda snipers. In his first and only demonstration, Phil attempted to show the troop what to do if stuck underneath a tree through the efforts of terrorists. A young boy named Jeremy volunteered to help Phil, but quickly regretted it when the tree's safety rope snapped, leaving him trapped and suffocating under the huge object. Phil tried to violently remove the tree only to inflict more pain on the scout and necessitate medical assistance. He then lamely comments that Jeremy was 'a wuss'.

Despite his enthusiasm, Phil was eventually informed that he had not made it into the state finals. In a fit of anger, embarrassment and possible denial, Phil lied about the situation to his family, leading to their going to Canberra regardless. When he tried to enter the finals, however, he was firmly asked to leave by security. His attempts to bribe the guards with a thousand dollars simply created an incident, causing his wife to expose his deceit. A bitter argument ensued ending with his family deserting him, leaving Phil to watch with utter contempt as the Queensland finalist was announced.

Three months after the announcement of Australian of the Year, Phil is still married and decided to quit motivational speaking and rejoined the police, but is also working on a miniseries about the jumping castle incident and other "situations" he got into, in which he will be played by Vince Colosimo.

As a reference to the film Chopper, Phil constantly compares Vince Colosimo to Eric Bana who was his on-screen rival in the film.

=== Ricky Wong ===
Ricky Wong is a 23-year-old Chinese physics student who lives in the suburb of Wheelers Hill, Melbourne, Victoria. He is often exuberant and tells his colleagues that "Physics is Phun" and that they are in the "Wong" laboratory. This is largely a vehicle for parodying the stereotypical "Chinese overachiever", or model migrant. He has achieved fame for his work in solar energy by developing a highly efficient solar energy panel, but his passion lies in acting. Ricky's dream is to become a professional actor. His father, however, does not want him acting and says that he should complete his physics degree after he finishes "Indigeridoo", a musical about indigenous Australians in which Ricky plays the main role: Walkabout Man. The production portrays many famous and well-known indigenous people, including Cathy Freeman, Deborah Mailman and Lionel Rose.

Once Ricky completed his PhD, he went to work for the CSIRO – his father had already secured him a job there. However, he soon became depressed, and much to his father's anger announced he was going to act full-time,

== Episodes ==
No.	Title	Written by	Original release date
1	"Episode 1"	Chris Lilley	27 July 2005
An introduction to five unique Australians who have been nominated for the Australian of the Year Award. Phil, a rescue hero who saved nine children in a jumping castle accident, Ricky, a Chinese physics genius and aspiring actor, Ja’mie, a charity-minded schoolgirl who sponsors 85 Sudanese children, Daniel and Nathan, hearing impaired teenage twin farm boys embarking on a world first eardrum transplant, and Pat, a disabled suburban housewife turned elite athlete.
2	"Episode 2"	Chris Lilley	3 August 2005
Meet the friends and family of the five Australian of the Year nominees. Phil grapples with his newfound fame. Ja’mie has a sleepover with her friends. Ricky auditions for 'Indigeridoo'. Daniel and Nathan spend a day in Dunt. Pat begins planning her roll to Uluru.
3	"Episode 3"	Chris Lilley	10 August 2005
The nominees get a chance to demonstrate why they should be the Australian of the Year. Phil teaches rescue techniques to a scout group. Ja’mie goes to a detention centre to visit one of the girls she sponsors, who has moved to Australia. Ricky begins rehearsals for 'Indigeridoo'. Daniel shows a magazine journalist around the farm. Pat gets a gumnut wedged up her nose.
4	"Episode 4"	Chris Lilley	17 August 2005
The nominees face obstacles on their journey towards the Australian of the Year finals. Phil tries to bribe a judge on the selection committee. Ja’mie performs in a shock assembly presentation. Ricky tells his father that he intends to become an actor. Nathan refuses to thank Daniel for giving up his eardrum. Pat and Terry construct a protective dingo cage.
5	"Episode 5"	Chris Lilley	24 August 2005
State finalists are notified and the nominees wait for the important call. Ja’mie receives news that all her sponsor children have died. Phil is rejected as a finalist, but lies to his family about the result. Ricky has a teary farewell as he takes to the stage for the last time. Daniel refuses to go to Canberra, while Nathan joyfully tests his new hearing. Pat’s party is interrupted with devastating news from her doctor.
6	"Episode 6"	Chris Lilley	31 August 2005
The nominees head to Canberra for the Australian of the Year state finals. Ja’mie brings the Sudanese girl who moved to Australia to the awards. Daniel and Nathan are more interested in fireworks than the awards. Pat puts her illness aside and rubs shoulders with celebrities. Ricky gets the chance to meet Cathy Freeman. Phil has no invitation and tries to bribe his way into the awards. None of the five won the title. Three months later, we revisit the lives of our five nominees: Pat has died, Phil has rejoined the police.

== Reception ==
The series was watched by an average of 749,000 per episode.

== Outside of the show ==
- Some of the characters were interviewed on Triple J's Today Today show, by Chris Taylor and Craig Reucassel, portrayed as actual Australian of the Year candidates. Despite the fact they are obviously parodies, several listeners called in to complain about their attitudes, especially that of Ja'mie King.
- Ja'mie King presented an ARIA Award for 'Highest Selling Single' to Anthony Callea with James Mathison in 2005.
- Ricky Wong made an appearance at the Logie Awards in 2006. He sang a song from Indigeridoo with Cathy Freeman.

== DVD release ==
We Can Be Heroes
Set details	Special features
6 episodes; 1 disc set; 16:9 aspect ratio; Subtitles: yes; English (2.0 stereo); Total running time: 164 minutes	42 minutes of deleted scenes, bloopers and outtakes
Release dates
Region 4 – 1 September 2005; Region 2 – 1 November 2006

We Can Be Heroes Special Edition
Set details	Special features
6 episodes; 2 disc set; 16:9 aspect ratio; Subtitles: yes; English (2.0 stereo); Total running time: approx. 300 minutes	Features over 2 hours of bloopers and deleted scenes for each character; Behind-the-scenes documentary; Extended episodes; Cast audition tapes; Ricky's performance of "Indigeridoo" at the Logies
Release dates
Region 4 – 1 November 2006 (contains 28-page booklet); Region 4 – 5 May 2011 (steelbook packaging; minus booklet); Region 2 – 6 October 2008 (available in the Chris Lilley Series Collection box set, individual release Amazon.co.uk exclusive); Region 1 – 4 December 2012 (HBO Home Entertainment)

== See also ==
- List of Australian television series
