= Agro (puppet) =

Australian puppet and media personality

Agro, as he appears in Agro's Cartoon Connection.

Agro is an Australian puppet and media personality, created by Gary Rhodes in 1981. His best known and longest serving performer was entertainer Jamie Dunn, who voiced and operated the puppet from 1982 until his death in 2026. Dunn also voiced the character on radio.

Agro was especially prominent on Australian television in the 1990s due to Agro's Cartoon Connection, a children's program that aired from 1990 to 1997 on weekday mornings on the Seven Network. His co-hosts were Ann-Maree Biggar and Terasa Livingstone.

== Characteristics ==
=== Description ===
Although it is often joked that he is made from a bathmat (Agro frequently describes himself as a "talking bathmat"), the original Agro puppet was an altered vintage 1978 Fisher-Price puppet of Animal from The Muppet Show. Later, the producer of Agro's Cartoon Connection claimed that Agro had been "altered by the Red Cross", after Jim Henson's Muppets made a claim regarding copyright. The original Agro puppet was unusual in its construction; the puppeteer could open and close the mouth, and could also manipulate the eyebrows via a plastic lever in the head: this allowed Dunn to create a sexually-suggestive leering expression, which he often used. The eyes and limbs do not move.

In 2001 Channel Seven enlisted puppeteer and puppet builder Warren Duxbury to rebuild Agro because the original Agro had deteriorated beyond repair. The new puppet was built for use on the short-lived revival of dating show Perfect Match that aired the following year. The nose of the new puppet was noticeably different from the old one.

=== Name and personality ===
The word "agro" (also spelled "aggro") is Australian slang for "aggression" or "aggravation". Agro is sometimes said to have the surname Vation, though the puppet is rarely credited with a surname.

Agro's humour tends to be adult, with much sexual suggestion, cursing and uninhibited behaviour. He has often appeared with an innocent-acting female offsider, who is subjected to mocking and innuendo. His pre-taped performances in shows intended for a juvenile or family audience were vetted before broadcast, but in the adult-oriented shows (and in the Christmas tapes of Agro's Cartoon Connection) his largely uncensored antics were given full rein. Unlike many characters, particularly children's puppets, Agro often broke the fourth wall, making reference, for example, to the facts that he was a puppet, that his limbs did not move, and that a hand was up his back.

Agro is a fan of the Australian rugby league footballer Wally Lewis, writing and singing many songs about him. He is a patron of the Shandar Smith Foundation, a charity for children with cancer.

== History ==
=== Television ===
The original Agro puppet was created in 1981 by BTQ-7 employee Gary Rhodes, who was a floor manager at the time. It was Rhodes who coined the concept of "eating flies" and other naughty quirks that later continued as part of the puppet's character.

After a falling out with Seven led to Rhodes' resignation, several different operators were involved in working the puppet. Struggling songwriter Jamie Dunn was eventually hired by Seven in 1982 as a permanent replacement after they received a song demo recorded by Dunn about Agro which included an impression of the character. It was Dunn who took the character to greater heights and created an iconic part of Australian television history. Dunn's marketing prowess resulted in the Agro concept becoming a lucrative career for him. However, Dunn has never appeared alongside Agro, as a typical ventriloquist might. When Agro appears on camera or on stage, Dunn is always hidden, often by furniture.

Agro initially appeared on the children's television shows Boris' Breakfast Club and Wombat, which later was spun off into the Super Sunday Show, and the Super Saturday Show on Seven. When the Saturday morning timeslot was replaced by Saturday Disney, Seven created the daily morning children's programme Agro's Cartoon Connection in 1990, hosted by Agro and Ann-Maree Biggar. Agro's Cartoon Connection would continue until its cancellation in 1997. Throughout the early 1990s Agro became increasingly popular, appearing on Tonight Live with Steve Vizard, the Logie Awards, advertisements for Queensland Transport, and contending on Family Feud with his extended puppet family. Agro also appeared in a wide range of merchandise including his own showbag at the Brisbane Ekka, an arcade video game, and numerous novelty albums.

After Agro's rise to fame there was some dispute between Rhodes and Jamie Dunn because Dunn attempted to claim creative ownership of the puppet. A court case loomed, but BTQ-7 and the parties involved reached a settlement that allowed Jamie Dunn to retain the rights. However, Agro officially belongs to Channel Seven. Dunn also owned the merchandising rights to the character, and had personal possession of the puppet.

Agro's on-camera roles became less frequent in the late 1990s and into the 2000s as Dunn's radio commitments grew and the novelty of the character had worn off, though Agro would become a co-host on Seven's short-lived revival of Perfect Match in 2002. The puppet itself was seldom seen during the 2000s. Dunn said at one point that Agro was "in a suitcase somewhere", and in 2019 joked that he was in an overnight bag in a closet. In 2008 Agro appeared in promotional material for Zinc 96.

In March 2009, Agro returned to television screens in South East Queensland to promote a $7,000 cash giveaway on radio station 4BC. From August 2013, Agro started appearing on the Channel 7 program The Daily Edition, interacting with the panel and answering viewer questions. In 2017, Agro appeared in several ads for "sellmycar.com.au", and has continued as the voice of the radio advertisement. In 2020 he appeared in several ads for Uber Eats. In 2021 Agro made a cameo appearance on the second episode of Holey Moley.

As of 2024, Jamie Dunn regularly did public appearances with Agro, sometimes with former Agro's Cartoon Connection co-hosts like Ranger Stacey. In December 2025, Dunn claimed that he was in discussions with Seven to produce an Agro Up Late special to air in 2026.

Dunn died on 7 March 2026, aged 76. Following Dunn's death, the Agro puppet was donated to the National Film and Sound Archive by Dunn's widow.

=== Radio ===
From 1990, Agro appeared in the morning radio segment for Brisbane station B105 FM, The Morning Crew. One notable segment was Agro to the Rescue, where Jamie Dunn in the Agro character would perform fundraising and charitable events for Queensland residents in need.

When Agro performed on radio Jamie Dunn would sit in the studio and provide the Agro voice without actually operating the puppet. Often Dunn would perform dual roles as himself or Agro, and it was often implied through the use of soundboard noises that Agro would "enter" the studio to talk to him. Dunn aspired to become a show-business personality in his own right, and so in time he appeared in promotional material for the B105 FM Morning Crew as himself. He used the Agro character as a kind of alternative, more uninhibited personality (for example, when making prank telephone calls).

== Career ==
=== Television host ===
Agro hosted the following Australian television shows:

- Boris' Breakfast Club (? – 1989)
- Wombat (1983–1990)
- Agro's Cartoon Connection (1990–1997)
- Super Sunday Show (aka Super Saturday Show & Seven's Super Saturday)
- Perfect Match (2002 revival)

Agro was a guest host for Tonight Live with Steve Vizard on four occasions. He also appeared many times as a guest on Tonight Live.

=== Television appearances ===
Agro has also appeared as a guest on the following television shows:

- The Don Lane Show
- Everybody
- Hey Dad..!
- Home And Away
- Hey Hey It's Saturday
- Wheel of Fortune (often appearing as the partner and mouthpiece for Fat Cat on Celebrity Wheel of Fortune)
- Family Feud (with his "family" father Star, mother Ellie and younger brother Neville)
- The Main Event
- Talk With the Animals
- Concentration
- The Daily Edition

Agro has also appeared on a number of Australian telethons, particularly those that raise money for the Royal Children's Hospital, Brisbane. Agro has also occasionally appeared as a panel member on the Channel Seven Perth Telethon, but usually after 10 p.m.

=== Pantomimes ===
Agro appeared in the following televised pantomimes which were written and produced by Dunn with Brett Davidson:

- Agro's Christmas Story (1987)
- A Very Agro Christmas (1989)

=== Radio host ===
Agro's radio credits include:

- The Morning Crew (1990–2005), B105 FM's breakfast show. Agro performed prank telephone calls and also presented a segment Agro to the Rescue, in which he would provide money or resources to a family or individual in trouble. Eventually the Agro performances were credited to Jamie Dunn, and the Agro character was marginalised.
- The Zinc Morning Zoo (2006–), with Ian Calder and Courtney Burns on Sunshine Coast FM radio station Zinc 96.

== Merchandising ==
At his height of popularity extensive Agro merchandising included four recorded studio albums (of which three were nominated for ARIA Awards), a Game Boy game (Agro Soar), an arcade game (Agro's Fantastic Video Game), and a range of other merchandise including action figures, snap cards, stickers, lunchboxes, and children's clothing, and annual showbags at various Australian agricultural shows.

For a period of time, an Agro ice cream similar to Bubble O' Bill was produced by Pauls. In a similar vein, Australian ice cream parlour Wendy's used to offer an Agro cone; this was a scoop of chocolate ice cream with various lollies to create a face. The Agro cone briefly returned to Wendy's stores in May 2026 as a tribute to Jamie Dunn following his death.

== Discography ==
=== Studio albums ===
List of albums, with selected details and chart positions
| Title | Album details | Peak chart positions |
| Title | Album details | AUS |
|---|---|---|
| The Agro Album | Released: November 1990; Label: CBS (467566 2) | 44 |
| Agro Too | Released: December 1991; Label: CBS (469273 2) | 100 |
| Agro Kids' Dance Party | Released: 1992; Label: CBS (472731 2) | — |
| Shaddap You Face Agro and Friends | Released: Label: J&B (JB541CD) | — |

=== Singles ===
List of singles, with selected chart positions
| Title | Year | Peak chart positions | Album |
| Title | Year | AUS | Album |
|---|---|---|---|
| "Living in a Child's Dream" | 1990 | 150 | The Agro Album |
| "Gimme Little Sign" | 1991 | — | Agro Too |
| "Don't Go in the Dunny" | 2002 | 88 | Non-album single |

== Awards and nominations ==
=== ARIA Music Awards ===
| Year | Nominated works | Award | Result |
|---|---|---|---|
| 1991 | The Agro Album | Best Children's Album | Nominated |
| 1992 | Agro Too | Best Children's Album | Nominated |
| 1992 | Agro Too | Best Comedy Release | Nominated |
| 1993 | Agro Kids Dance Album | Best Comedy Release | Nominated |

=== Logie Awards ===
| Year | Nominated works | Award | Result |
|---|---|---|---|
| 1987 | Wombat | Most Popular Children's Program | Won |
| 1988 | Wombat | Most Popular Children's Program | Won |
| 1989 | Wombat | Most Popular Children's Program | Won |
| 1990 | Wombat | Most Popular Children's Program | Won |
| 1991 | Agro's Cartoon Connection | Most Popular Children's Program | Won |
| 1992 | Agro's Cartoon Connection | Most Popular Children's Program | Won |
| 1993 | Agro's Cartoon Connection | Most Popular Children's Program | Won |
| 1994 | Agro's Cartoon Connection | Most Popular Children's Program | Won |
| 1995 | Agro's Cartoon Connection | Most Popular Children's Program | Won |
| 1996 | Agro's Cartoon Connection | Most Popular Children's Program | Won |
| 1997 | Agro's Cartoon Connection | Most Popular Children's Program | Won |

He also received a Penguin Award for "Best Presenter of Light Entertainment".
