= Logie Awards of 2006 =

Australian television awards ceremony

48th Logie Awards
- Date: 7 May 2006
- Site: Crown Palladium, Melbourne, Victoria
- Hosted by: Bert Newton; Ray Martin; Daryl Somers; Lisa McCune; Georgie Parker

Highlights
- Gold Logie: John Wood
- Hall of Fame: Play School
- Most awards: Home and Away (4)
- Most nominations: Home and Away (13)

Television coverage
- Network: Nine Network

The 48th Annual TV Week Logie Awards was held on Sunday 7 May 2006 at the Crown Palladium in Melbourne, and broadcast on the Nine Network. The ceremony was hosted by Bert Newton, Ray Martin, Daryl Somers, Lisa McCune and Georgie Parker. The nominations were announced at the 50 Years of Television Exhibition at the Powerhouse Museum in Sydney on 3 April 2006. In an historic first, the public then voted for their choice of the eight nominees (instead of five) for the Gold Logie via SMS or a 1900 number, right up until the awards night. Special guests included Chris Noth, George Eads and Joan Rivers.

== Winners and nominees ==
In the tables below, winners are listed first and highlighted in bold.

=== Gold Logie ===
Most Popular Personality on Australian Television
- **John Wood in Blue Heelers (Seven Network)**
  - Natalie Bassingthwaighte in Neighbours (Network Ten)
  - Bridie Carter in McLeod's Daughters (Nine Network)
  - Bec Hewitt in Home and Away (Seven Network)
  - Rove McManus in Rove Live (Network Ten)
  - Bert Newton in Good Morning Australia (Network Ten)
  - Ada Nicodemou in Home and Away (Seven Network)
  - Kate Ritchie in Home and Away (Seven Network)

=== Acting/Presenting ===
Most Popular Actor	Most Popular Actress
**John Wood in Blue Heelers (Seven Network)**; Chris Hemsworth in Home and Away (Seven Network); Aaron Jeffery in McLeod's Daughters (Nine Network); Joel McIlroy in Home and Away (Seven Network); Glenn Robbins in Da Kath & Kim Code (ABC TV)	**Kate Ritchie in Home and Away (Seven Network)**; Natalie Bassingthwaighte in Neighbours (Network Ten); Bridie Carter in McLeod's Daughters (Nine Network); Bec Hewitt in Home and Away (Seven Network); Ada Nicodemou in Home and Away (Seven Network)
Most Outstanding Actor in a Series	Most Outstanding Actress in a Series
**Dan Wyllie in Love My Way (Fox8)**; Brendan Cowell in Love My Way (Fox8); John Howard in All Saints (Seven Network); Alex O'Loughlin in The Incredible Journey of Mary Bryant (Network Ten); John Wood in Blue Heelers (Seven Network)	**Claudia Karvan in Love My Way (Fox8)**; Justine Clarke in The Surgeon (Network Ten); Romola Garai in The Incredible Journey of Mary Bryant (Network Ten); Asher Keddie in Love My Way (Fox8); Lisa McCune in Hell Has Harbour Views (ABC TV)
Most Popular New Male Talent	Most Popular New Female Talent
**Paul O'Brien in Home and Away (Seven Network)**; Adam Hills in Spicks and Specks (ABC TV); Dan O'Connor in Neighbours (Network Ten); Jonny Pasvolsky in McLeod's Daughters (Nine Network); Rhys Wakefield in Home and Away (Seven Network)	**Jodi Gordon in Home and Away (Seven Network)**; Pippa Black in Neighbours (Network Ten); Jennifer Hawkins in The Great Outdoors (Seven Network); Rachael Taylor in headLand (Seven Network); Sharni Vinson in Home and Away (Seven Network)
Most Outstanding New Talent	Most Popular TV Presenter
**Chris Lilley in We Can Be Heroes: Finding The Australian of the Year (ABC TV)**; Heath Franklin in The Ronnie Johns Half Hour (Network Ten); Adam Hills in Spicks and Specks (ABC TV); Matt Shirvington in Beyond Tomorrow (Seven Network); Kat Stewart in Supernova (UK.TV)	**Rove McManus in Rove Live (Network Ten)**; Melissa Doyle in Sunrise (Seven Network); David Koch in Sunrise (Seven Network); Andrew O'Keefe in Deal or No Deal (Seven Network); Tom Williams in The Great Outdoors and The Mole (Seven Network)

=== Most Popular Programs ===
Most Popular Australian Drama Series	Most Popular Light Entertainment or Comedy Program
**Home and Away (Seven Network)**; All Saints (Seven Network); Blue Heelers (Seven Network); McLeod's Daughters (Nine Network); Neighbours (Network Ten)	**Dancing with the Stars (Seven Network)**; Deal or No Deal (Seven Network); The Glass House (ABC TV); Rove Live (Network Ten); Spicks and Specks (ABC TV)
Most Popular Sports Program	Most Popular Lifestyle Program
**The NRL Footy Show (Nine Network)**; The AFL Footy Show (Nine Network); Before the Game (Network Ten); RPM (Network Ten); Sports Tonight (Network Ten)	**Backyard Blitz (Nine Network)**; Better Homes and Gardens (Seven Network); Getaway (Nine Network); The Great Outdoors (Seven Network); Renovation Rescue (Nine Network)
Most Popular Reality Program
**Australian Idol (Network Ten)**; Big Brother 5 (Network Ten); Border Security (Seven Network); The Mole (Seven Network); RPA (Nine Network)

=== Most Outstanding Programs ===
Most Outstanding Drama Series	Most Outstanding Mini Series or Telemovie
**Love My Way (Fox8)**; All Saints (Seven Network); McLeod's Daughters (Nine Network); MDA (ABC TV); The Surgeon (Network Ten)	**The Incredible Journey of Mary Bryant (Network Ten)**; Da Kath & Kim Code (ABC TV); Hell Has Harbour Views (ABC TV); Little Oberon (Nine Network); Small Claims: White Wedding (Network Ten)
Most Outstanding Comedy Program	Most Outstanding Sports Coverage
**We Can Be Heroes: Finding The Australian of the Year (ABC TV)**; Comedy Inc - The Late Shift (Nine Network); The Glass House (ABC TV); The Ronnie Johns Half Hour (Network Ten); Spicks and Specks (ABC TV)	**Super Cheap Auto 1000 (Network Ten)**; AFL Grand Final (Network Ten); Australian Tennis Open (Seven Network); Emirates Melbourne Cup Day (Seven Network); Lexmark Indy 300 (Network Ten)
Most Outstanding Children's Program	Most Outstanding News Coverage
**Blue Water High (ABC TV)**; Camp Orange (Nickelodeon); Hi-5 (Nine Network); Scope (Network Ten); Wicked Science (Network Ten)	**"Aceh: Last Man Standing", ABC News (ABC TV)**; "The Bali Nine", Ten News (Network Ten); "New Orleans Rescue", Seven News (Seven Network); "Schapelle Corby Verdict", Seven News (Seven Network); "Vivian Solon", Lateline (ABC TV)
Most Outstanding Public Affairs Report	Most Outstanding Documentary Series
**"The Gathering Storm", Australian Story (ABC TV)**; "After the Waves: Asia's Tsunami, One Year On", The 7.30 Report (ABC TV); "Inside Indonesia's Sex Trade", Dateline (SBS TV); "Hands Off", 60 Minutes (Nine Network); "Melbourne Confidential", Four Corners (ABC TV)	**He's Coming South: The Attack on Sydney Harbour (The History Channel)**; The Colony (SBS TV); Divorce Stories (SBS TV); Frank Hurley: The Man who Made History (ABC TV); Revealing Gallipoli (ABC TV)

== Performers ==
- Pink
- David Campbell
- Chris Lilley (as Ricky Wong) with Cathy Freeman
- Sherbet
- Cirque du Soleil
- Bert Newton (Tribute to Graham Kennedy)

== Hall of Fame ==
Play School became the 23rd induction into the TV Week Logies Hall of Fame (the third television programme to do so).
