= Logie Awards of 2004 =

Australian television awards ceremony

46th Logie Awards
- Date: 18 April 2004
- Site: Crown Palladium, Melbourne, Victoria
- Hosted by: Eddie McGuire

Highlights
- Gold Logie: Rove McManus
- Hall of Fame: Sam Chisholm
- Most awards: McLeod's Daughters (4)
- Most nominations: McLeod's Daughters (10)

Television coverage
- Network: Nine Network

The 46th Annual TV Week Logie Awards was held on Sunday 18 April 2004 at the Crown Palladium in Melbourne, and broadcast on the Nine Network. The ceremony was hosted by Eddie McGuire, and guests included Mel Brooks and Ronn Moss.

== Winners and nominees ==
In the tables below, winners are listed first and highlighted in bold.

=== Gold Logie ===
Most Popular Personality on Australian Television
- **Rove McManus in Rove (Live) (Network Ten)**
  - Lisa Chappell in McLeod's Daughters (Nine Network)
  - Delta Goodrem in Neighbours (Network Ten)
  - Georgie Parker in All Saints (Seven Network)
  - John Wood in Blue Heelers (Seven Network)

=== Acting/Presenting ===
Most Popular Actor	Most Popular Actress
**Aaron Jeffery in McLeod's Daughters (Nine Network)**; Beau Brady in Home and Away (Seven Network); Myles Pollard in McLeod's Daughters (Nine Network); Glenn Robbins in Kath & Kim (ABC TV); Erik Thomson in All Saints (Seven Network)	**Lisa Chappell in McLeod's Daughters (Nine Network)**; Bridie Carter in McLeod's Daughters (Nine Network); Bec Cartwright in Home and Away (Seven Network); Delta Goodrem in Neighbours (Network Ten); Tammin Sursok in Home and Away (Seven Network)
Most Outstanding Actor in a Series	Most Outstanding Actress in a Series
**Ray Barrett in After the Deluge (Network Ten)**; Tim Draxl in The Shark Net (ABC TV); Abe Forsythe in Marking Time (ABC TV); William McInnes in The Shark Net (ABC TV); Gary Sweet in Stingers (Nine Network); David Wenham in After the Deluge (Network Ten)	**Deborah Mailman in The Secret Life of Us (Network Ten)**; Bridie Carter in McLeod's Daughters (Nine Network); Claudia Karvan in The Secret Life of Us (Network Ten); Kate Kendall in Stingers (Nine Network); Angie Milliken in The Shark Net (ABC TV)
Most Popular New Male Talent	Most Popular New Female Talent
**Kip Gamblin in Home and Away (Seven Network)**; Dr. Chris Brown in Harry's Practice (Seven Network); Daniel Frederiksen in Stingers (Nine Network); Andrew O'Keefe in Deal or No Deal (Seven Network); Luke van Dyck in DIY Rescue and Renovation Rescue (Nine Network)	**Isabel Lucas in Home and Away (Seven Network)**; Simmone Jade Mackinnon in McLeod's Daughters (Nine Network); Stephanie McIntosh in Neighbours (Network Ten); Katrina Milosevic in Stingers (Nine Network); Amy Mizzi in Home and Away (Seven Network)
Most Popular TV Presenter	Most Popular Overseas TV Star
**Rove McManus in Rove (Live) (Network Ten)**; Ernie Dingo in The Great Outdoors (Seven Network); Jamie Durie in Backyard Blitz (Nine Network); Andrew G in Australian Idol (Network Ten) and Channel V Australia; David Koch in Sunrise (Seven Network)	**Jennifer Aniston in Friends (Nine Network)**; Simon Baker in The Guardian (Network Ten); Jennifer Garner in Alias (Seven Network); Ray Romano in Everybody Loves Raymond (Network Ten); Kiefer Sutherland in 24 (Seven Network)

=== Most Popular Programs ===
Most Popular Australian Drama Series	Most Popular Light Entertainment or Comedy Program
**McLeod's Daughters (Nine Network)**; All Saints (Seven Network); Blue Heelers (Seven Network); Home and Away (Seven Network); Neighbours (Network Ten)	**Rove (Live) (Network Ten)**; Australia's Funniest Home Video Show (Nine Network); Kath & Kim (ABC TV); Merrick and Rosso: Unplanned (Nine Network); Who Wants to Be a Millionaire? (Nine Network)
Most Popular Reality Program	Most Popular Sports Program
**Australian Idol (Network Ten)**; Big Brother (Network Ten); The Block (Nine Network); The Mole in Paradise (Seven Network); RPA (Nine Network)	**The AFL Footy Show (Nine Network)**; The Cream with Roy and HG (Seven Network); The Fat (ABC TV); The NRL Footy Show (Nine Network); Sports Tonight (Network Ten)
Most Popular Lifestyle Program	Most Popular Australian Program
**Backyard Blitz (Nine Network)**; DIY Rescue (Nine Network); Getaway (Nine Network); The Great Outdoors (Seven Network); Harry's Practice (Seven Network)	**McLeod's Daughters (Nine Network)**; All Saints (Seven Network); Australian Idol (Network Ten); Blue Heelers (Seven Network); Home and Away (Seven Network); Neighbours (Network Ten); Rove (Live) (Network Ten)
Most Popular Overseas Comedy	Most Popular Overseas Drama
**Friends (Nine Network)**; Everybody Loves Raymond (Network Ten); My Wife and Kids (Seven Network); The Simpsons (Network Ten); Will & Grace (Seven Network)	**CSI: Crime Scene Investigation (Nine Network)**; 24 (Seven Network); Alias (Seven Network); The Bill (ABC TV); ER (Nine Network)

=== Most Outstanding Programs ===
Most Outstanding Drama Series	Most Outstanding Mini Series or Telemovie
**The Secret Life of Us (Network Ten)**; All Saints (Seven Network); Always Greener (Seven Network); Grass Roots (ABC TV); McLeod's Daughters (Nine Network)	**After the Deluge (Network Ten)**; BlackJack (Network Ten); Marking Time (ABC TV); The Postcard Bandit (Nine Network); The Shark Net (ABC TV)
Most Outstanding Comedy Program	Most Outstanding Sports Coverage
**CNNNN and Kath & Kim (ABC TV)**; The Glass House (ABC TV); Pizza (SBS TV); An Audience with Dame Edna (The Comedy Channel)	**Bob Jane T-Mart 1000 (Network Ten)**; AFL: Friday Night Football (Nine Network); Foster's Australian Grand Prix (Network Ten); Nine's Summer of Test Cricket (Nine Network); Rugby League State of Origin (Nine Network); Rugby World Cup (Seven Network)
Most Outstanding Children's Preschool Program	Most Outstanding Children's Program
**Hi-5 (Nine Network)**; Bambaloo (Seven Network); Playhouse Disney (Seven Network/Disney Channel); Play School (ABC TV); The Pop Pups (ABC TV)	**Bootleg (ABC TV)**; The Big Arvo (Seven Network); Ocean Star (Network Ten); Out There (ABC TV); Pirate Islands (Network Ten)
Most Outstanding News Coverage	Most Outstanding Public Affairs Report
**"Marine's fire", ABC News (ABC TV)**; "Canberra bushfires", National Nine News (Nine Network); "Waterfall disaster", Seven News (Seven Network)	**"The Big A (Hazel Hawke Story)", Australian Story (ABC TV)**; "Aceh (In Bed With The TNI)", Dateline (SBS); "Inside Nauru (Pacific Despair)", Dateline (SBS); "The Jesuits", The 7.30 Report (ABC TV); "Making a Killing", 60 Minutes (Nine Network)
Most Outstanding Documentary Series
**Dying to Leave (SBS)**; Beyond Bronte (Nine Network); From Korea with Love (SBS); Love is in the Air (ABC TV); Man Made: The Story of Two Men and a Baby (SBS); Plumpton High Babies (ABC TV)

== Performers ==
- Anastacia
- Michael Bublé – "Moondance"
- Shannon Noll
- Guy Sebastian
- Jane Turner (Kath) and Gina Riley (Kim) – "Lady Bump"
- Cirque du Soleil

== Hall of Fame ==
After a lifetime in the television industry, Sam Chisholm became the 21st inductee into the TV Week Logies Hall of Fame.
