= Logie Awards of 2005 =

Australian television awards ceremony

47th Logie Awards
- Date: 1 May 2005
- Site: Crown Palladium, Melbourne, Victoria
- Hosted by: Eddie McGuire; Andrew O'Keefe; Rove McManus

Highlights
- Gold Logie: Rove McManus
- Hall of Fame: Neighbours
- Most awards: Rove (Live) (3)
- Most nominations: Home and Away (8)

Television coverage
- Network: Nine Network

The 47th Annual TV Week Logie Awards was held on Sunday 1 May 2005 at the Crown Palladium in Melbourne, and broadcast on the Nine Network. In an historic first, the ceremony was hosted by Eddie McGuire, Andrew O'Keefe and Rove McManus. Special guests included Kathryn Morris and Adam Rodríguez.

== Winners and nominees ==
In the tables below, winners are listed first and highlighted in bold.

=== Gold Logie ===
Most Popular Personality on Australian Television
- **Rove McManus in Rove (Live) (Network Ten)**
  - Bridie Carter in McLeod's Daughters (Nine Network)
  - Bec Cartwright in Home and Away (Seven Network)
  - Georgie Parker in All Saints (Seven Network)
  - John Wood in Blue Heelers (Seven Network)

=== Acting/Presenting ===
Most Popular Actor	Most Popular Actress
**John Wood in Blue Heelers (Seven Network)**; Beau Brady in Home and Away (Seven Network); Chris Hemsworth in Home and Away (Seven Network); Aaron Jeffery in McLeod's Daughters (Nine Network); Glenn Robbins in Kath & Kim (ABC TV)	**Bec Cartwright in Home and Away (Seven Network)**; Jane Allsop in Blue Heelers (Seven Network); Bridie Carter in McLeod's Daughters (Nine Network); Gina Riley in Kath & Kim (ABC TV); Magda Szubanski in Kath & Kim (ABC TV)
Most Outstanding Actor in a Series	Most Outstanding Actress in a Series
**Sam Neill in Jessica (Network Ten)**; Brendan Cowell in Love My Way (Fox8); Abe Forsythe in Fireflies (ABC TV); Tony Martin in Jessica (Network Ten); Dan Wyllie in Love My Way (Fox8)	**Miranda Otto in Through My Eyes: The Lindy Chamberlain Story (Seven Network)**; Rebecca Gibney in Small Claims (Network Ten); Claudia Karvan in Love My Way (Fox8); Asher Keddie in Love My Way (Fox8); Leeanna Walsman in Jessica (Network Ten)
Most Popular New Male Talent	Most Popular New Female Talent
**Chris Hemsworth in Home and Away (Seven Network)**; Ben Nicholas in Neighbours (Network Ten); Dean O'Gorman in McLeod's Daughters (Nine Network); Jason Smith in Home and Away (Seven Network); Wil Traval in All Saints (Seven Network)	**Natalie Blair in Neighbours (Network Ten)**; Indiana Evans in Home and Away (Seven Network); Rachel Gordon in Blue Heelers (Seven Network); Natalie Saleeba in All Saints (Seven Network); Samantha Tolj in Blue Heelers (Seven Network)
Most Popular TV Presenter
**Rove McManus in Rove (Live) (Network Ten)**; Andrew Denton in Enough Rope with Andrew Denton (ABC TV); Jamie Durie in Backyard Blitz (Nine Network); David Koch in Sunrise (Seven Network); Andrew O'Keefe in Deal or No Deal (Seven Network)

=== Most Popular Programs ===
Most Popular Australian Drama Series	Most Popular Light Entertainment or Comedy Program
**McLeod's Daughters (Nine Network)**; All Saints (Seven Network); Blue Heelers (Seven Network); Home and Away (Seven Network); Neighbours (Network Ten)	**Rove (Live) (Network Ten)**; Dancing with the Stars (Seven Network); Deal or No Deal (Seven Network); Kath & Kim (ABC TV); Merrick and Rosso Unplanned (Nine Network)
Most Popular Sports Program	Most Popular Lifestyle Program
**The NRL Footy Show (Nine Network)**; The AFL Footy Show (Nine Network); Before The Game (Network Ten); The Dream in Athens with Roy and HG (Seven Network); Sports Tonight (Network Ten)	**Backyard Blitz (Nine Network)**; Burke's Backyard (Nine Network); Getaway (Nine Network); The Great Outdoors (Seven Network); Renovation Rescue (Nine Network)
Most Popular Reality Program	Most Popular Overseas Program
**Australian Idol (Network Ten)**; Big Brother 4 (Network Ten); The Block (Nine Network); My Restaurant Rules (Seven Network); RPA (Nine Network)	**The O.C. (Network Ten)**; The Bill (ABC TV); CSI: Crime Scene Investigation (Nine Network); ER (Nine Network); Friends (Nine Network)

=== Most Outstanding Programs ===
Most Outstanding Drama Series	Most Outstanding Mini Series or Telemovie
**Love My Way (Fox8)**; Love Bytes (Fox8); Fireflies (ABC TV); Stingers (Nine Network); The Secret Life of Us (Network Ten)	**Jessica (Network Ten)**; The Alice (Nine Network); The Brush Off, Murray Whelan Series (Seven Network); Small Claims (Network Ten); Through My Eyes: The Lindy Chamberlain Story (Seven Network)
Most Outstanding Comedy Program	Most Outstanding Sports Coverage
**The Chaser Decides (ABC TV)**; Derrick, Episode 2 (The Comedy Channel); John Safran vs God (SBS TV); Kath & Kim (ABC TV); Bobo and Pauly: The Early Years (SBS TV)	**Bob Jane T-Mart 1000 (Network Ten)**; AFL Grand Final (Network Ten); Athens Olympic Games (Seven Network); The Melbourne Cup (Seven Network); NRL State of Origin 2: Qld vs NSW (Nine Network)
Most Outstanding Children's Program	Most Outstanding News Coverage
**Out There: Series 2 (ABC TV)**; Bambaloo (Seven Network); Hi-5 (Nine Network); Noah & Saskia (ABC TV); Wicked Science (Network Ten)	**"Tsunami: 30 December 2004", National Nine News (Nine Network)**; "Beslan", National Nine News (Nine Network); "Iraq Hostage", ABC News (ABC TV); "Victoria Ganglands", ABC News (ABC TV); "Tsunami Disaster", Ten News (Network Ten)
Most Outstanding Public Affairs Report	Most Outstanding Documentary Series
**"Into the Forest (Ivan Milat) Part 1", Australian Story (ABC TV)**; "Beslan Prepares for a Funeral", The 7:30 Report (ABC TV); "Coming Clean: Drugs and Cycling", 60 Minutes (Nine Network); "The Trials of Mamdouh Habib", Dateline (SBS TV); "Taliban Country", Dateline (SBS TV)	**The President vs David Hicks (SBS TV)**; The Last Voices From Heaven Parts 1 & 2 (Foxtel); Moulin Rouge Girls (ABC TV); Stories From a Children's Hospital: Chloe's Story (ABC TV); Tug of Love (SBS TV)

== Performers ==
- Mario
- The cast of Neighbours
- The cast of Grease: The Arena Spectacular
- Il Divo
- Michael Bublé

== Hall of Fame ==
After 20 years on Australian television, Neighbours became the 22nd inductee into the TV Week Logies Hall of Fame.
