= Logie Awards of 2003 =

Australian television awards ceremony

45th Logie Awards
- Date: 11 May 2003
- Site: Crown Palladium, Melbourne, Victoria
- Hosted by: Eddie McGuire

Highlights
- Gold Logie: Rove McManus
- Hall of Fame: Don Lane
- Most awards: All Saints and Rove (Live) (3)
- Most nominations: All Saints and The Secret Life of Us (7)

Television coverage
- Network: Nine Network

The 45th Annual TV Week Logie Awards was held on Sunday 11 May 2003 at the Crown Palladium in Melbourne, and broadcast on the Nine Network. The ceremony was hosted by Eddie McGuire, and guests included Simon Baker and Dennis Haysbert.

== Winners and nominees ==
In the tables below, winners are listed first and highlighted in bold.

=== Gold Logie ===
Most Popular Personality on Australian Television
- **Rove McManus in Rove (Live) (Network Ten)**
  - Lisa Chappell in McLeod's Daughters (Nine Network)
  - Georgie Parker in All Saints (Seven Network)
  - Libby Tanner in All Saints (Seven Network)
  - John Wood in Blue Heelers (Seven Network)

=== Acting/Presenting ===
Most Popular Actor	Most Popular Actress
**Erik Thomson in All Saints (Seven Network)**; Beau Brady in Home and Away (Seven Network); Samuel Johnson in The Secret Life of Us (Network Ten); Myles Pollard in McLeod's Daughters (Nine Network); John Wood in Blue Heelers (Seven Network)	**Libby Tanner in All Saints (Seven Network)**; Bridie Carter in McLeod's Daughters (Nine Network); Lisa Chappell in McLeod's Daughters (Nine Network); Claudia Karvan in The Secret Life of Us (Network Ten); Georgie Parker in All Saints (Seven Network)
Most Outstanding Actor in a Series	Most Outstanding Actress in a Series
**Peter O'Brien in White Collar Blue (Network Ten)**; Shane Bourne in MDA (ABC TV); John Howard in Always Greener (Seven Network); Samuel Johnson in The Secret Life of Us (Network Ten); Gary Sweet in Stingers (Nine Network)	**Claudia Karvan in The Secret Life of Us (Network Ten)**; Kerry Armstrong in MDA (ABC TV); Deborah Mailman in The Secret Life of Us (Network Ten); Freya Stafford in White Collar Blue (Network Ten); Juliet Stevenson in The Road From Coorain (ABC TV)
Most Popular New Male Talent	Most Popular New Female Talent
**Patrick Harvey in Neighbours (Network Ten)**; Jay Bunyan in Neighbours (Network Ten); Daniel Collopy in Home and Away (Seven Network); Michael Dorman in The Secret Life of Us (Network Ten); Ben Mortley in McLeod's Daughters (Nine Network)	**Delta Goodrem in Neighbours (Network Ten)**; Michelle Ang in Neighbours (Network Ten); Mieke Buchan (Fox8, SBS World Sports, National Geographic Channel); Alexandra Davies in Young Lions (Nine Network); Jodie Dry in White Collar Blue (Network Ten)
Most Popular TV Presenter
**Rove McManus in Rove (Live) (Network Ten)**; Dr. Harry Cooper in Harry's Practice (Seven Network); Ernie Dingo in The Great Outdoors (Seven Network); Jamie Durie in Backyard Blitz (Nine Network); Eddie McGuire in Who Wants to Be a Millionaire? (Nine Network)

=== Most Popular Programs ===
Most Popular Australian Program	Most Popular Light Entertainment or Comedy Program
**All Saints (Seven Network)**; Blue Heelers (Seven Network); Home and Away (Seven Network); McLeod's Daughters (Nine Network); The Secret Life Of Us (Network Ten)	**Rove (Live) (Network Ten)**; The Crocodile Hunter (Network Ten); Kath & Kim (ABC TV); Russell Coight's All Aussie Adventures (Network Ten); Who Wants to Be a Millionaire? (Nine Network)
Most Popular Lifestyle Program	Most Popular Sports Program
**Backyard Blitz (Nine Network)**; Better Homes and Gardens (Seven Network); Getaway (Nine Network); The Great Outdoors (Seven Network); Harry's Practice (Seven Network)	**The AFL Footy Show (Nine Network)**; The Fat (ABC TV); The NRL Footy Show (Nine Network); The Monday Dump with Roy and H.G. (Seven Network); Sports Tonight (Network Ten)
Most Popular Reality Program	Most Popular Overseas Program
**RPA (Nine Network)**; Australian Survivor (Nine Network); Big Brother 2 (Network Ten); Celebrity Big Brother (Network Ten); The Mole 3 (Seven Network)	**Friends (Nine Network)**; 24 (Seven Network); The Bill (ABC TV); ER (Nine Network); Everybody Loves Raymond (Network Ten)

=== Most Outstanding Programs ===
Most Outstanding Drama Series	Most Outstanding Mini Series or Telemovie
**The Secret Life of Us (Network Ten)**; All Saints (Seven Network); Always Greener (Seven Network); MDA (ABC TV); Stingers (Nine Network); White Collar Blue (Network Ten)	**The Road From Coorain (ABC TV)**; Heroes' Mountain (Network Ten); Secret Bridesmaids' Business (ABC TV)
Most Outstanding Comedy Program	Most Outstanding Children's Program
**Kath & Kim (ABC TV)**; CNNNN (ABC TV); The Ice Dream with Roy and H.G. (Seven Network); John Safran's Music Jamboree (SBS TV); Russell Coight's All Aussie Adventures (Network Ten)	**Tracey McBean (ABC TV)**; Hi-5 (Nine Network); Horace and Tina (Network Ten); Lights, Camera, Action, Wiggles! (ABC TV); Totally Wild (Network Ten)
Most Outstanding Sports Coverage	Most Outstanding News Coverage
**Ashes Test Series 2002-03 (Nine Network)**; Australian Formula One Grand Prix (Network Ten); FIFA World Cup 2002 (SBS and Nine Network); The XIX Winter Olympic Games – Salt Lake City (Seven Network); The XVII Commonwealth Games – Manchester (Seven Network)	**"The al-Qaeda Tapes", ABC News (ABC TV)**; "Bali Bombing", ABC News (ABC TV); "Bali Explosion", National Nine News (Nine Network); "Bushfires", Seven News (Seven Network); "The New Kurdistan", Dateline (SBS TV)
Most Outstanding Public Affairs Program	Most Outstanding Documentary Series
**Sunday (Nine Network)**; The 7.30 Report (ABC TV); Dateline (SBS TV); Foreign Correspondent (ABC TV); Lateline (ABC TV)	**Australian Story (ABC TV)**; Black Chicks Talking (ABC TV); Gough Whitlam: In His Own Words (SBS TV); Gulpilil: One Red Blood (ABC TV); Rainbow Bird and Monster Man (SBS TV)

== Performers ==
- Steve Irwin
- Delta Goodrem
- Bec Cartwright
- Sophie Monk
- Dannii Minogue

== Hall of Fame ==
After several years on Australian television, Don Lane became the 20th inductee into the TV Week Logies Hall of Fame.
