= Logie Awards of 1993 =

35th Logie Awards
- Date: 19 March 1993
- Site: Grand Hyatt, Melbourne, Victoria
- Hosted by: Bert Newton

Highlights
- Gold Logie: Ray Martin
- Hall of Fame: Reg Grundy
- Most awards: Hey Hey It's Saturday, Police Rescue and Tracks of Glory (2)

Television coverage
- Network: Network Ten

The 35th Annual TV Week Logie Awards was held on Friday 19 March 1993 at the Grand Hyatt in Melbourne, and broadcast on Network Ten. The ceremony was hosted by Bert Newton and guests included John Spencer, Vanessa Williams, Tom Jones, Pamela Stephenson, Juliet Mills, Hayley Mills, Yahoo Serious and Dame Edna.

== Nominees and winners ==
Winners are listed first and highlighted in bold.

=== Gold Logie ===
Most Popular Personality on Australian Television
- **Ray Martin for The Midday Show (Nine Network)**
  - Georgie Parker for A Country Practice (Seven Network)
  - Bruce Samazan for E Street (Network Ten)
  - Daryl Somers for Hey Hey It's Saturday (Nine Network)

=== Acting/Presenting ===
Most Popular Actor	Most Popular Actress
**Gary Sweet for Police Rescue (ABC TV)**; Cameron Daddo for Boney (Seven Network); Scott Michaelson for Neighbours (Network Ten); Bruce Samazan for E Street (Network Ten)	**Georgie Parker for A Country Practice (Seven Network)**; Rebekah Elmaloglou for Home and Away (Seven Network); Toni Pearen for E Street (Network Ten); Kym Wilson for A Country Practice (Seven Network)
Most Outstanding Actor	Most Outstanding Actress
**Gary Sweet for Police Rescue (ABC TV)**	**Ruth Cracknell for Mother and Son (ABC TV)**
Most Popular Actor in a Telemovie or Miniseries	Most Popular Actress in a Telemovie or Miniseries
**Cameron Daddo for Tracks of Glory (Seven Network)**; Garry McDonald for The Other Side of Paradise (Network Ten); Craig McLachlan for Heroes II: The Return (Seven Network); Gary Sweet for Children of the Dragon (ABC TV)	**Josephine Byrnes for The Man From Snowy River (Seven Network)**; Justine Clarke for Tracks of Glory (Seven Network); Marg Downey for The Making of Nothing; Judy Morris for The Other Side of Paradise (Network Ten)
Most Popular New Talent	Most Popular Light Entertainment Personality
**Simon Baker for E Street (Network Ten)**; Dieter Brummer for Home and Away (Seven Network); Natalie Imbruglia for Neighbours (Network Ten); Matthew Krok for Hey Dad..! (Seven Network)	**Daryl Somers for Hey Hey It's Saturday (Nine Network)**; Ray Martin for Midday (Nine Network); Bert Newton for Good Morning Australia (Network Ten); Steve Vizard for Tonight Live (Seven Network)
Most Popular Comedy Personality
**Mary Coustas for Acropolis Now (Seven Network)**; Ruth Cracknell for Mother and Son (ABC TV); Jon English for All Together Now (Nine Network); Magda Szubanski for Fast Forward (Seven Network)

=== Most Popular Programs/Videos ===
Most Popular Series	Most Popular Comedy Program
**Home and Away** **(Seven Network)**; A Country Practice (Seven Network); E Street (Network Ten); Police Rescue (ABC TV)	**Fast Forward** **(Seven Network)**; All Together Now (Nine Network); Hey Dad..! (Seven Network); Mother and Son (ABC TV)
Most Popular Light Entertainment Program	Most Popular Public Affairs Program
**Hey Hey It's Saturday** **(Nine Network)**; Australia's Funniest Home Videos (Nine Network); The Main Event (Seven Network); Midday (Nine Network)	**A Current Affair** **(Nine Network)**; Hinch (Network Ten); Real Life (Seven Network); 60 Minutes (Nine Network)
Most Popular Lifestyle Information Program	Most Popular Telemovie or Miniseries
**Burke's Backyard** **(Nine Network)**; Beyond 2000 (Seven Network); Getaway (Nine Network); Healthy, Wealthy and Wise (Network Ten)	**Tracks of Glory** **(Seven Network)**; Heroes II: The Return (Seven Network); The Leaving of Liverpool (ABC TV); The Other Side of Paradise (Network Ten)
Most Popular Sports Coverage	Most Popular Children's Program
**Barcelona Olympic Games (Seven Network)**; AFL Grand Final (Seven Network); World Cup Cricket (Nine Network); Australian Open Tennis (Seven Network)	**Agro's Cartoon Connection** **(Seven Network)**; Play School (ABC TV); Saturday Disney (Seven Network); Vidiot (ABC TV)
Most Popular Music Video
"**Everything's Alright**" **by John Farnham, Kate Ceberano and Jon Stevens**; "Accidentally Kelly Street" by Frente!; "The Day You Went Away" by Wendy Matthews; "In Your Room" by Toni Pearen

=== Most Outstanding Programs ===
Most Outstanding Miniseries or Telemovie	Most Outstanding Drama Series
**The Leaving of Liverpool (ABC TV)**	**Phoenix (ABC TV)**
Most Outstanding Achievement in News	Most Outstanding Achievement in Public Affairs
"**Bangkok Riots**" (ABC TV)	**The Investigators (ABC TV)**
Most Outstanding Achievement by Regional Television	Most Outstanding Single Documentary or Series
**Stranded (Prime Television)**	**Cop it Sweet (ABC TV)**; **Faces in the Mob (ABC TV)**

== Performers ==
- Tom Jones and John Farnham
- Hot Shoe Shuffle
- Jean Kittson and Mary-Anne Fahey
- Julie McGregor
- Rachael Beck
- Kelley Abbey
- Todd McKenney
- Nathan Cavaleri

== Hall of Fame ==
After a lifetime in Australian television, Reg Grundy became the 10th inductee into the TV Week Logies Hall of Fame.
