= Logie Award for Most Popular New Female Talent =

- Country: Australia
- Presented by: TV Week
- First award: 1999
- Final award: 2013
- Website: www.tvweeklogieawards.com.au

The Silver Logie for Most Popular New Female Talent was an award presented at the Australian TV Week Logie Awards. It was first awarded at the 41st Annual TV Week Logie Awards ceremony, held in 1999. The award is given to honour a standout performance of a new female talent on an Australian program. It may or may not be her first television appearance, however it is her first major television role. The winner and nominees of Most Popular New Female Talent were chosen by the public through an online voting survey on the TV Week website. This award category was eliminated in 2014 and replaced by the gender non-specific category, Most Popular New Talent. Home and Away has the most recipients of this award, with a total of five wins, followed by Neighbours with two wins.

== Winners and nominees ==
Key	Meaning
‡	Indicates the winner

Year	Nominees	Program	Network(s)	Ref
1999	Kimberley Cooper‡	Home and Away	Seven Network	
1999	Rebecca Cartwright	Home and Away	Seven Network	
1999	Libby Tanner	All Saints	Seven Network	
1999	Dr. Katrina Warren	Harry's Practice	Seven Network	
2000	Jane Allsop‡	Blue Heelers	Seven Network	
2000	Holly Valance	Neighbours	Network Ten	
2000	Kylie Watson	Home and Away	Seven Network	
2000	Aleetza Wood	Home and Away	Seven Network	
2001	Tammin Sursok‡	Home and Away	Seven Network	
2001	Caroline Craig	Blue Heelers	Seven Network	
2001	Madeleine West	Neighbours	Network Ten	
2001	Karina Brown	Sale of the Century	Nine Network	
2002	Lisa Chappell‡	McLeod's Daughters	Nine Network	
2002	Michala Banas	Always Greener	Seven Network	
2002	Sibylla Budd	The Secret Life of Us	Network Ten	
2002	Stephanie Chaves-Jacobsen	Home and Away	Seven Network	
2002	Jessica Gower	The Secret Life of Us	Network Ten	
2003	Delta Goodrem‡	Neighbours	Network Ten	
2003	Michelle Ang	Neighbours	Network Ten	
2003	Mieke Buchan	—N/a	Fox8	
2003	Mieke Buchan	—N/a	SBS World Sports	
2003	Mieke Buchan	—N/a	National Geographic Channel	
2003	Alexandra Davies	Young Lions	Nine Network	
2003	Jodie Dry	White Collar Blue	Network Ten	
2004	Isabel Lucas‡	Home and Away	Seven Network	
2004	Simmone Jade Mackinnon	McLeod's Daughters	Nine Network	
2004	Stephanie McIntosh	Neighbours	Network Ten	
2004	Katrina Milosevic	Stingers	Nine Network	
2004	Amy Mizzi	Home and Away	Seven Network	
2005	Natalie Blair‡	Neighbours	Network Ten	
2005	Indiana Evans	Home and Away	Seven Network	
2005	Rachel Gordon	Blue Heelers	Seven Network	
2005	Natalie Saleeba	All Saints	Seven Network	
2005	Samantha Tolj	Blue Heelers	Seven Network	
2006	Jodi Gordon‡	Home and Away	Seven Network	
2006	Pippa Black	Neighbours	Network Ten	
2006	Jennifer Hawkins	The Great Outdoors	Seven Network	
2006	Rachael Taylor	headland	Seven Network	
2006	Sharni Vinson	Home and Away	Seven Network	
2007	Amy Mathews‡	Home and Away	Seven Network	
2007	Jolene Anderson	All Saints	Seven Network	
2007	Brooke Hanson	What's Good For You	Nine Network	
2007	Michelle Langstone	McLeod's Daughters	Nine Network	
2007	Jessica Tovey	Home and Away	Seven Network	
2008	Bindi Irwin‡	Bindi the Jungle Girl	ABC1	
2008	Charlotte Best	Home and Away	Seven Network	
2008	Tammy Clarkson	The Circuit	SBS	
2008	Adelaide Kane	Neighbours	Network Ten	
2008	Zoe Ventoura	Kick	SBS	
2009	Jessica Marais‡	Packed to the Rafters	Seven Network	
2009	Kirsty Lee Allan	Sea Patrol	Nine Network	
2009	Rebecca Breeds	Home and Away	Seven Network	
2009	Ricki-Lee Coulter	Australian Idol	Network Ten	
2009	Margot Robbie	Neighbours	Network Ten	
2010	Carrie Bickmore‡	The 7pm Project	Network Ten	
2010	Kate Bell	Home and Away	Seven Network	
2010	Ashleigh Brewer	Neighbours	Network Ten	
2010	Mirrah Foulkes	All Saints: Medical Response Unit	Seven Network	
2010	Katherine Hicks	Rescue: Special Ops	Nine Network	
2011	Chrissie Swan‡	The Circle	Network Ten	
2011	Emma Booth	Underbelly: The Golden Mile	Nine Network	
2011	Julie Goodwin	Home Cooked! with Julie Goodwin	Nine Network	
2011	Poh Ling Yeow	Poh's Kitchen	ABC1	
2011	Hannah Marshall	Packed to the Rafters	Seven Network	
2012	Melissa Bergland‡	Winners & Losers	Seven Network	
2012	Anna McGahan	Underbelly: Razor	Nine Network	
2012	Chelsie Preston Crayford	Underbelly: Razor	Nine Network	
2012	Demi Harman	Home and Away	Seven Network	
2012	Tiffiny Hall	The Biggest Loser Australia	Network Ten	
2013	Brenna Harding‡	Puberty Blues	Network Ten	
2013	Clare Bowditch	Offspring	Network Ten	
2013	Annabel Crabb	Kitchen Cabinet	ABC2	
2013	Catherine Mack	Home and Away	Seven Network	
2013	Edwina Royce	House Husbands	Nine Network	

== Multiple wins/nominations ==
Number	Program
Wins
5	Home and Away
2	Neighbours
Number	Program
Nominations
18	Home and Away
10	Neighbours
4	All Saints
4	Blue Heelers
3	McLeod's Daughters
3	Underbelly
2	The Secret Life of Us
2	Packed to the Rafters

== See also ==
- George Wallace Memorial Logie for Best New Talent
- Graham Kennedy Award for Most Outstanding Newcomer
- Logie Award for Most Popular New Male Talent
- Logie Award for Most Popular New Talent
