= Logie Awards of 2009 =

Australian television awards

51st Logie Awards
- Date: 3 May 2009
- Site: Crown Palladium, Melbourne, Victoria
- Hosted by: Gretel Killeen

Highlights
- Gold Logie: Rebecca Gibney
- Hall of Fame: Bill Collins
- Most awards: Packed to the Rafters (6)
- Most nominations: Packed to the Rafters (11)

The 51st Annual TV Week Logie Awards was held on Sunday 3 May 2009 at the Crown Palladium in Melbourne, and broadcast on the Nine Network. The ceremony was hosted by Gretel Killeen, while the red carpet arrivals was hosted by Jules Lund, Shelley Craft, Lyndsey Rodrigues and Carson Kressley. The red carpet arrivals was watched by 1.7 million viewers, while the ceremony was watched by 1.57 million viewers.

== Winners and nominees ==
In the tables below, winners are listed first and highlighted in bold.

=== Gold Logie ===
Most Popular Personality on Australian Television
- **Rebecca Gibney in Packed to the Rafters (Seven Network)**
  - Natalie Bassingthwaighte in So You Think You Can Dance Australia (Network Ten)
  - Andrew Denton in Enough Rope (ABC1)
  - Adam Hills in Spicks and Specks (ABC1)
  - Simmone Jade Mackinnon in McLeod's Daughters (Nine Network)
  - Rove McManus in Rove and Are You Smarter Than a 5th Grader? (Network Ten)
  - Kate Ritchie in Home and Away (Seven Network)
  - Ian Smith in Neighbours (Network Ten)

=== Acting/Presenting ===
Most Popular Actor	Most Popular Actress
**Todd Lasance in Home and Away (Seven Network)**; Gyton Grantley in Underbelly (Nine Network); Mark Priestley in All Saints (Seven Network); Ian Smith in Neighbours (Network Ten); Erik Thomson in Packed to the Rafters (Seven Network)	**Rebecca Gibney in Packed to the Rafters (Seven Network)**; Jodi Gordon in Home and Away (Seven Network); Simmone Jade Mackinnon in McLeod's Daughters (Nine Network); Kate Ritchie in Home and Away (Seven Network); Kat Stewart in Underbelly (Nine Network)
Most Outstanding Actor in a Series	Most Outstanding Actress in a Series
**Gyton Grantley in Underbelly (Nine Network)**; Dustin Clare in Satisfaction (Showcase); Vince Colosimo in Underbelly (Nine Network); Callan Mulvey in Rush (Network Ten); Damian Walshe-Howling in Underbelly (Nine Network)	**Kat Stewart in Underbelly (Nine Network)**; Julia Blake in Bed of Roses (ABC1); Rebecca Gibney in Packed to the Rafters (Seven Network); Claire van der Boom in Rush (Network Ten); Madeleine West in Satisfaction (Showcase)
Most Popular New Male Talent	Most Popular New Female Talent
**Hugh Sheridan in Packed to the Rafters (Seven Network)**; Dean Geyer in Neighbours (Network Ten); George Houvardas in Packed to the Rafters (Seven Network); Matt Lee in So You Think You Can Dance Australia (Network Ten); Jordan Rodrigues in Home and Away (Seven Network)	**Jessica Marais in Packed to the Rafters (Seven Network)**; Kirsty Lee Allan in Sea Patrol (Nine Network); Rebecca Breeds in Home and Away (Seven Network); Ricki-Lee Coulter in Australian Idol (Network Ten); Margot Robbie in Neighbours (Network Ten)
Most Outstanding New Talent	Most Popular Presenter
**Jessica Marais in Packed to the Rafters (Seven Network)**; Lauren Clair in Underbelly (Nine Network); Hanna Mangan-Lawrence in Bed of Roses (ABC1); Hugh Sheridan in Packed to the Rafters (Seven Network); Ashley Zukerman in Rush (Network Ten)	**Rove McManus in Rove and Are You Smarter Than a 5th Grader? (Network Ten)**; Natalie Bassingthwaighte in So You Think You Can Dance Australia (Network Ten); Andrew Denton in Enough Rope (ABC1); Grant Denyer in It Takes Two and Australia's Got Talent (Seven Network); Adam Hills in Spicks and Specks (ABC1)

=== Most Popular Programs ===
Most Popular Drama Series	Most Popular Light Entertainment Program
**Packed to the Rafters (Seven Network)**; Home and Away (Seven Network); McLeod's Daughters (Nine Network); Neighbours (Network Ten); Underbelly (Nine Network)	**Rove (Network Ten)**; Australia's Got Talent (Seven Network); Deal or No Deal (Seven Network); Spicks and Specks (ABC1); Sunrise (Seven Network)
Most Popular Lifestyle Program	Most Popular Factual Program
**Better Homes and Gardens (Seven Network)**; Domestic Blitz (Nine Network); Getaway (Nine Network); Ready Steady Cook (Network Ten); Top Gear Australia (SBS)	**Bondi Rescue (Network Ten)**; Border Security (Seven Network); Find My Family (Seven Network); RPA (Nine Network); RSPCA Animal Rescue (Seven Network)
Most Popular Sports Program	Most Popular Reality Program
**The NRL Footy Show (Nine Network)**; The AFL Footy Show (Nine Network); Before the Game (Network Ten); Sports Tonight (Network Ten); Wide World of Sports (Nine Network)	**So You Think You Can Dance Australia (Network Ten)**; Australian Idol (Network Ten); The Biggest Loser (Network Ten); Dancing with the Stars (Seven Network); The Farmer Wants a Wife (Nine Network)

=== Most Outstanding Programs ===
Most Outstanding Drama Series, Miniseries or Telemovie	Most Outstanding Comedy Program
**Underbelly (Nine Network)**; Bed of Roses (ABC1); Packed to the Rafters (Seven Network); Rush (Network Ten); Scorched (Nine Network)	**The Hollowmen (ABC1)**; Mark Loves Sharon (Network Ten); Mr. Firth Goes to Washington (SBS); Review with Myles Barlow (ABC1); Very Small Business (ABC1)
Most Outstanding Sports Coverage	Most Outstanding News Coverage
**Beijing Olympics (Seven Network)**; AFL Grand Final (Seven Network); Beijing Paralympics (ABC1); Supercheap Auto Bathurst 1000 (Seven Network); Tour de France (SBS)	**"China Earthquake", ABC News (ABC1)**; "Brisbane Storms", Seven News (Seven Network); "China Earthquake", Nine News Sydney (Nine Network); "Financial Crisis" (Sky News Business); "Nike Human Rights Investigation", Seven News (Seven Network)
Most Outstanding Children's Program	Most Outstanding Public Affairs Report
**H_{2}O: Just Add Water (Network Ten)**; As the Bell Rings (Disney Channel); Dogstar (Nine Network); Figaro Pho (ABC1); Nickelodeon Australian Kids' Choice Awards (Nickelodeon)	**"Afghanistan: A Survivor's Tale", Foreign Correspondent (ABC1)**; "Friday's Child", Australian Story (ABC1); "Mugabe's Calling Card", Dateline (SBS); "Out of Control", 60 Minutes (Nine Network); "Timor War Criminal", Today Tonight (Seven Network)
Most Outstanding Documentary	Most Outstanding Factual Program
**First Australians (SBS)**; Beyond Kokoda (The History Channel); The Oasis: Australia's Homeless Youth (ABC1); Schapelle Corby: The Hidden Truth (Nine Network); The Howard Years (ABC1)	**Border Security (Seven Network)**; Family Fortunes (ABC1); RPA (Nine Network); Two in the Top End (ABC1); Who Do You Think You Are? (SBS)

== Performers ==
- Jessica Mauboy – "Been Waiting"
- Natalie Bassingthwaighte – "1000 Stars"
- Tom Burlinson – "Unforgettable"
- Annie Lennox – "There Must Be an Angel (Playing with My Heart)"

== Hall of Fame ==
Bill Collins became the 26th inductee into the TV Week Logies Hall of Fame.

== Multiple nominations and awards ==
The following shows received multiple nominations.

- 11 nominations: Packed to the Rafters
- 9 nominations: Underbelly
- 7 nominations: Home and Away
- 5 nominations: Neighbours
- 3 nominations: McLeod's Daughters and Rove
- 2 nominations: All Saints

The following shows received multiple awards.

- 6 awards: Packed to the Rafters
- 3 awards: Underbelly
- 2 awards: Rove
