= Logie Awards of 1995 =

37th Logie Awards
- Date: 28 April 1995
- Site: Melbourne Concert Hall, Melbourne, Victoria
- Hosted by: Andrew Daddo and Noni Hazelhurst

Highlights
- Gold Logie: Ray Martin
- Hall of Fame: Jack Thompson
- Most awards: Home and Away and Hey Hey It's Saturday (3)
- Most nominations: Home and Away and Hey Hey It's Saturday (6)

Television coverage
- Network: Seven Network

The 37th Annual TV Week Logie Awards were held on 28 April 1995 at the Melbourne Concert Hall in Melbourne, and broadcast on the Seven Network. The ceremony was hosted by Andrew Daddo and Noni Hazelhurst. Guests included Dean Cain, Mark Curry, Holly Robinson and Big Bird.

== Nominees and winners ==
Winners are listed first and highlighted in bold. The nominees were confirmed in the 15 April 1995 issue of TV Week.

=== Gold Logie ===
Most Popular Personality on Australian Television
- **Ray Martin for A Current Affair (Nine Network)**
  - Melissa George for Home and Away (Seven Network)
  - Daryl Somers for Hey Hey It's Saturday (Nine Network)
  - Gary Sweet for Police Rescue (ABC TV)

=== Acting/Presenting ===
Most Popular Actor	Most Popular Actress
**Dieter Brummer for Home and Away (Seven Network)**; Gary Sweet for Police Rescue (ABC TV); John Wood for Blue Heelers (Seven Network)	**Melissa George for Home and Away (Seven Network)**; Lisa Hensley for Law of the Land (Nine Network); Lisa McCune for Blue Heelers (Seven Network)
Most Outstanding Actor	Most Outstanding Actress
**Chris Haywood for Janus (ABC TV)**	**Monica Maughan for The Damnation of Harvey McHugh (ABC TV)**
Most Popular Comedy Personality	Most Popular Light Entertainment Personality
**Daryl Somers for Hey Hey It's Saturday (Nine Network)**; Russell Gilbert for Hey Hey It's Saturday (Nine Network); Magda Szubanski for Big Girl's Blouse (Seven Network)	**Daryl Somers for Hey Hey It's Saturday (Nine Network)**; Andrew Denton for Denton (Seven Network); Larry Emdur for The Price Is Right (Nine Network)
Most Popular New Talent
**Lisa McCune for Blue Heelers (Seven Network)**; Daniel Amalm for Home and Away (Seven Network); Isla Fisher for Home and Away (Seven Network)

=== Most Popular Programs ===
Most Popular Series	Most Popular Drama
**Home and Away** **(Seven Network)**; Banjo Paterson's The Man From Snowy River (Nine Network); Blue Heelers (Seven Network)	**The Battlers** **(Seven Network)**; Heartland (ABC TV); Janus (ABC TV)
Most Popular Light Entertainment Program	Most Popular Comedy Program
**Hey Hey It's Saturday** **(Nine Network)**; Just Kidding (Nine Network); Man O Man (Seven Network)	**Full Frontal** **(Seven Network)**; Hey Hey It's Saturday (Nine Network); Mother and Son (ABC TV)
Most Popular Public Affairs Program	Most Popular Lifestyle/Information Program
**A Current Affair** **(Nine Network)**; 60 Minutes (Nine Network); The 7.30 Report (ABC TV)	**Burke's Backyard** **(Nine Network)**; Getaway (Nine Network); The Great Outdoors (Seven Network)
Most Popular Sports Program	Most Popular Children's Program
**1994 Commonwealth Games** **(Network Ten)**; The Footy Show (Nine Network); Rugby League State of Origin (Nine Network)	**Agro's Cartoon Connection** **(Seven Network)**; A*mazing (Seven Network); Totally Wild (Network Ten)

=== Most Outstanding Programs ===
Most Outstanding Achievement in Drama Production	Most Outstanding Achievement in Comedy
**Janus (ABC TV)**; The Damnation of Harvey McHugh (ABC TV); Halifax f.p. (Nine Network)	**Frontline (ABC TV)**
Most Outstanding Achievement in News	Most Outstanding Achievement by a Regional Network
"**Rwanda Refugee Crisis**" **(ABC TV)**	**Sandakan: The Untold Story (NBN)**
Most Outstanding Achievement in Public Affairs	Most Outstanding Single Documentary or Series
"**Inside a Holocaust**", **Four Corners (ABC TV)**	**Fifty Years of Silence (ABC TV)**

== Performers ==
- Hot Taps
- Alyssa-Jane Cook
- Mental As Anything

== Hall of Fame ==
After a lifetime in Australian television, Jack Thompson became the 12th inductee into the TV Week Logie Hall of Fame.
