= Vation =

Vation may refer to:

- The putative surname of Agro (puppet), Australian puppet and media personality
- Man-O-Vations, a recurring concept in The Man Show
