= Logie Awards of 1994 =

36th Logie Awards
- Date: 17 April 1994
- Site: World Congress Centre, Melbourne, Victoria
- Hosted by: Ray Martin

Highlights
- Gold Logie: Ray Martin
- Hall of Fame: Charles "Bud" Tingwell
- Most awards: Police Rescue and Mother and Son (3)

Television coverage
- Network: Nine Network

The 36th Annual TV Week Logie Awards was held on Sunday 17 April 1994 at the World Congress Centre in Melbourne, and broadcast on the Nine Network. The ceremony was hosted by Ray Martin and guests included Michael Crawford and Grant Shaud.

== Winners ==
=== Gold Logie ===
Most Popular Personality on Australian Television
Winner: Ray Martin in Midday (Nine Network)

Other Nominees: Gary Sweet, Dieter Brummer, Daryl Somers

=== Acting/Presenting ===
Most Popular Actor
Winner: Gary Sweet in Police Rescue (ABC TV)

Other Nominees: Shane Porteous in A Country Practice, Dieter Brummer in Home and Away

Most Popular Actress
Winner: Sonia Todd in Police Rescue (ABC TV)

Other Nominees: Rebecca Gibney in All Together Now, Melissa George in Home and Away

Most Outstanding Actor
Winner: Garry McDonald in Mother and Son (ABC TV)

Most Outstanding Actress
Winner: Ruth Cracknell in Mother and Son (ABC TV)

Other Nominees: Denise Roberts in G.P. (ABC TV), Jacqueline McKenzie in Stark (ABC TV)

Most Popular Comedy Personality
Winner: Ruth Cracknell in Mother and Son (ABC TV)

Most Popular Light Entertainment Personality
Winner: Ray Martin in Midday (Nine Network)

Most Popular New Talent
Winner: Melissa George in Home and Away (Seven Network)

=== Most Popular Programs ===
Most Popular Series
Winner: Home and Away (Seven Network)

Other Nominees: A Country Practice, G.P.

Most Popular Drama
Winner: Police Rescue (ABC TV)

Other Nominees: Law of the Land, Snowy

Most Popular Light Entertainment Program
Winner: Hey Hey It's Saturday (Nine Network)

Other Nominees: The Late Show, Ray Martin at Midday

Most Popular Comedy Program
Winner: The Late Show (ABC TV)

Other Nominees: Hey Hey It's Saturday (Nine Network), Mother and Son (ABC TV)

Most Popular Public Affairs Program
Winner: Real Life (Seven Network)

Other Nominees: A Current Affair, Hinch

Most Popular Lifestyle or Information Program
Winner: Burke's Backyard (Nine Network)

Most Popular Sports Program
Winner: AFL Grand Final (Seven Network)

Most Popular Children's Program
Winner: Agro's Cartoon Connection (Seven Network)

=== Most Outstanding Programs ===
Most Outstanding Achievement in Drama Production
Winner: Phoenix II (ABC TV)

Most Outstanding Achievement in Comedy
Winner: The Late Show (ABC TV)

Other Nominees: Mother and Son (ABC TV), Full Frontal (Seven Network)

Most Outstanding Achievement in News
Winner: "Sydney 2000 Announcement" (Nine Network)

Most Outstanding Achievement in Public Affairs
Winner: "Ships of Shame", Sunday (Nine Network)

Most Outstanding Documentary Single or Series
Winner: Labor in Power (ABC TV)

Most Outstanding Achievement by a Regional Network
Winner: Rest in Peace (Prime Television)

== Performers ==
- David Dixon
- Caroline O'Connor
- Abi Tucker
- Randy Crawford
- Gary Sweet
- Jon English
- Larry Emdur
- Steady Eddy
- Matthew Krok
- Rebecca Gibney
- Kimberley Davies
- Shirley Strachan
- Ronnie Burns
- Derryn Hinch
- Jane Hall
- Mark Mitchell
- Stan Grant
- Ann-Maree Biggar

== Hall of Fame ==
After a lifetime in Australian television, Charles "Bud" Tingwell became the 11th inductee into the TV Week Logies Hall of Fame.
