= Logie Award for Most Popular Entertainment Program =

Australian TV Award

- Country: Australia
- Presented by: TV Week
- First award: 1986
- Currently held by: The Voice (2025)

Highlights
- Most awards: Hey Hey It's Saturday (9)
- Website: www.tvweeklogieawards.com.au

The Logie for Most Popular Entertainment Program is an award presented annually at the Australian TV Week Logie Awards. It recognises the popularity of an Australian light entertainment program from various formats including comedy, talent, variety, music, talk, and traditional game shows.

It was first awarded at the 28th Annual TV Week Logie Awards, held in 1986 when the award was originally called Most Popular Australian Light Entertainment Program. Over the years, it has been known as Most Popular Light Entertainment Program (1987–1988, 1993–2014), Most Popular Light Entertainment or Comedy Program (1989–1992), Most Popular Entertainment Program (2015) and Best Entertainment Program (2016-2017). From 2018, the award category name was reverted to Most Popular Light Entertainment Program.

The winner and nominees of this category are chosen by the public through an online voting survey on the TV Week website. Hey Hey It's Saturday holds the record for the most wins, with nine, followed by Rove with six wins.

== Winners and nominees ==
Key	Meaning
‡	Indicates the winning program

Year	Program	Network	Ref
1986	Perfect Match‡	Network Ten	
1987	Hey Hey It's Saturday‡	Nine Network	
1988	Hey Hey It's Saturday‡	Nine Network	
1989	The Comedy Company‡	Network Ten	
1990	The Comedy Company‡	Network Ten	
1991	Fast Forward‡	Seven Network	
1992	Fast Forward‡	Seven Network	
1993	Hey Hey It's Saturday‡	Nine Network	
1994	Hey Hey It's Saturday‡	Nine Network	
1995	Hey Hey It's Saturday‡	Nine Network	
1996	Don't Forget Your Toothbrush‡	Nine Network	
1997	Hey Hey It's Saturday‡	Nine Network	
1998	Hey Hey It's Saturday‡	Nine Network	
1999	Hey Hey It's Saturday‡	Nine Network	
1999	Battle of the Sexes	Network Ten	
1999	Midday with Kerri-Anne	Nine Network	
1999	The Panel	Network Ten	
2000	Hey Hey It's Saturday‡	Nine Network	
2000	Australia's Funniest Home Video Show	Nine Network	
2000	The Panel	Network Ten	
2000	Rove	Nine Network	
2001	The Panel‡	Network Ten	
2001	Rove (Live)	Network Ten	
2001	Surprise Surprise	Nine Network	
2001	Who Wants to Be a Millionaire?	Nine Network	
2002	Rove (Live)‡	Network Ten	
2002	Australia's Funniest Home Videos	Nine Network	
2002	The Crocodile Hunter	Network Ten	
2002	The Panel	Network Ten	
2002	This Is Your Life	Nine Network	
2003	Rove (Live)‡	Network Ten	
2003	The Crocodile Hunter	Network Ten	
2003	Kath & Kim	ABC TV	
2003	Russell Coight's All Aussie Adventures	Network Ten	
2003	Who Wants to Be a Millionaire?	Nine Network	
2004	Rove (Live)‡	Network Ten	
2004	Australia's Funniest Home Video Show	Nine Network	
2004	Kath & Kim	ABC TV	
2004	Merrick and Rosso Unplanned	Nine Network	
2004	Who Wants to Be a Millionaire?	Nine Network	
2005	Rove (Live)‡	Network Ten	
2005	Dancing with the Stars	Seven Network	
2005	Deal or No Deal	Seven Network	
2005	Kath & Kim	ABC TV	
2005	Merrick and Rosso Unplanned	Nine Network	
2006	Dancing with the Stars‡	Seven Network	
2006	Deal or No Deal	Seven Network	
2006	The Glass House	ABC TV	
2006	Rove Live	Network Ten	
2006	Spicks and Specks	ABC TV	
2007	Rove Live‡	Network Ten	
2007	20 to 1	Nine Network	
2007	Bert's Family Feud	Nine Network	
2007	Deal or No Deal	Seven Network	
2007	Thank God You're Here	Network Ten	
2008	Kath & Kim ‡	Seven Network	
2008	The Chaser's War on Everything	ABC1	
2008	Spicks and Specks	ABC1	
2008	Summer Heights High	ABC1	
2008	Thank God You're Here	Network Ten	
2009	Rove‡	Network Ten	
2009	Australia's Got Talent	Seven Network	
2009	Deal or No Deal	Seven Network	
2009	Spicks and Specks	ABC1	
2009	Sunrise	Seven Network	
2010	Talkin' 'Bout Your Generation‡	Network Ten	
2010	Deal or No Deal	Seven Network	
2010	Hey Hey It's Saturday: The Reunion	Nine Network	
2010	Spicks and Specks	ABC1	
2010	Sunrise	Seven Network	
2011	The Circle‡	Network Ten	
2011	Good News Week	Network Ten	
2011	Hey Hey It's Saturday	Nine Network	
2011	Sunrise	Seven Network	
2011	Talkin' 'Bout Your Generation	Network Ten	
2012	Hamish and Andy's Gap Year‡	Nine Network	
2012	Australia's Got Talent	Seven Network	
2012	The Project	Network Ten	
2012	Spicks and Specks	ABC1	
2012	Sunrise	Seven Network	
2013	The Voice‡	Nine Network	
2013	Gruen Planet	ABC1	
2013	Hamish & Andy's Euro Gap Year	Nine Network	
2013	The Project	Network Ten	
2013	The X Factor	Seven Network	
2014	Hamish & Andy's Gap Year Asia‡	Nine Network	
2014	Ja'mie: Private School Girl	ABC1	
2014	The Project	Network Ten	
2014	The Voice	Nine Network	
2014	The X Factor	Seven Network	
2015	Hamish & Andy's Gap Year South America‡	Nine Network	
2015	Family Feud	Network Ten	
2015	The Project	Network Ten	
2015	Sunrise	Seven Network	
2015	The Voice	Nine Network	
2016	Family Feud‡	Network Ten	
2016	Gruen	ABC	
2016	Have You Been Paying Attention?	Network Ten	
2016	The Voice	Nine Network	
2016	The X Factor Australia	Seven Network	
2017	Have You Been Paying Attention?‡	Network Ten	
2017	Anh's Brush with Fame	ABC	
2017	Family Feud	Network Ten	
2017	The Voice	Nine Network	
2017	Upper Middle Bogan	ABC	
2018	Gogglebox Australia‡	Network Ten; Foxtel	
2018	Anh's Brush with Fame	ABC	
2018	Family Feud	Network Ten	
2018	Hard Quiz	ABC	
2018	The Project	Network Ten	
2019	Gogglebox Australia‡	Network Ten; Foxtel	
2019	Anh's Brush with Fame	ABC	
2019	Dancing with the Stars	Network Ten	
2019	Gruen	ABC	
2019	Hard Quiz	ABC	
2019	The Voice	Nine Network	
2022	Gogglebox Australia‡	Network Ten; Foxtel	
2022	Anh's Brush with Fame	ABC	
2022	Hard Quiz	ABC	
2022	Lego Masters	Nine Network	
2022	The Masked Singer Australia	Network Ten	
2022	The Voice	Seven Network	
2023	Gogglebox Australia‡	Network Ten; Foxtel	
2023	Australia's Got Talent	Seven Network	
2023	Gruen	ABC	
2023	Hard Quiz	ABC	
2023	Lego Masters	Nine Network	
2023	The Voice	Seven Network	
2024	The Voice‡	Seven Network	
2024	ABC New Year's Eve	ABC	
2024	Australian Idol	Seven Network	
2024	Dancing with the Stars	Seven Network	
2024	Take 5 with Zan Rowe	ABC	
2024	Vision Australia's Carols by Candlelight	Nine Network	
2025	The Voice‡	Seven Network	
2025	ABC New Year's Eve	ABC	
2025	Australian Idol	Seven Network	
2025	Countdown 50 Years On	ABC	
2025	Dancing with the Stars	Seven Network	
2025	Vision Australia's Carols by Candlelight	Nine Network	

== Multiple wins ==
Number	Program
Wins
9	Hey Hey It's Saturday
6	Rove
4	Gogglebox Australia
3	Hamish and Andy's Gap Year
3	The Voice
2	The Comedy Company
2	Fast Forward

== See also ==
- Logie Award for Most Popular Comedy Program
