= Logie Award for Most Popular Drama Program =

- Country: Australia
- Presented by: TV Week
- First award: 1977
- Currently held by: Home and Away (2023)

Highlights
- Most awards: Home and Away (9)
- Website: www.tvweeklogieawards.com.au

The Silver Logie Most Popular Drama Program is an award presented annually at the Australian TV Week Logie Awards. It recognises the popularity of an Australian drama production.

It was first awarded at the 19th Annual TV Week Logie Awards, held in 1977 when it was originally called Most Popular Australian Drama. This award category was eliminated in 1989 when the category Most Popular Series replaced it, but was reintroduced in 1991, only to be eliminated again the following year for that alternative category name. It returned in 1994 for three years alongside that other category. After a seven-year absence, the category was reintroduced in 2004.

Over the years, it has been known as Most Popular Drama (1978, 1986, 1988), Most Popular Drama Series (1979–1984, 1987, 1991, 2008–2013), Most Popular Drama Program (1985, 2014–15), Most Popular Australian Drama Series (2004–2005) and Best Drama Program (2016–2017). In 2018, the award category name was reverted to Most Popular Drama Program. In 2023, the award category was renamed to Most Popular Drama Series, Miniseries or Telemovie.

The winner and nominees of Most Popular Drama Program are chosen by the public through an online voting survey on the TV Week website. Home and Away holds the record for the most wins, with eight, followed by Packed to the Rafters with four wins.

== Winners and nominees ==
Key	Meaning
‡	Indicates the winning program

Year	Program	Network	Ref
1977	Power Without Glory‡	ABC	
1978	The Sullivans‡	Nine Network	
1979	The Sullivans‡	Nine Network	
1980	The Sullivans‡	Nine Network	
1981	Prisoner‡	Network Ten	
1982	Prisoner‡	Network Ten	
1983	Sons and Daughters‡	Seven Network	
1984	A Country Practice‡	Seven Network	
1985	A Country Practice‡	Seven Network	
1986	A Country Practice‡	Seven Network	
1987	Neighbours‡	Network Ten	
1988	Neighbours‡	Network Ten	
1991	Home and Away‡	Seven Network	
1994	Police Rescue‡	ABC	
1995	The Battlers‡	Seven Network	
1996	Police Rescue‡	ABC	
2004	McLeod's Daughters‡	Nine Network	
2004	All Saints	Seven Network	
2004	Blue Heelers	Seven Network	
2004	Home and Away	Seven Network	
2004	Neighbours	Network Ten	
2005	McLeod's Daughters‡	Nine Network	
2005	All Saints	Seven Network	
2005	Blue Heelers	Seven Network	
2005	Home and Away	Seven Network	
2005	Neighbours	Network Ten	
2006	Home and Away‡	Seven Network	
2006	All Saints	Seven Network	
2006	Blue Heelers	Seven Network	
2006	McLeod's Daughters	Nine Network	
2006	Neighbours	Network Ten	
2007	Home and Away‡	Seven Network	
2007	All Saints	Seven Network	
2007	Blue Heelers	Seven Network	
2007	McLeod's Daughters	Nine Network	
2007	Neighbours	Network Ten	
2008	Home and Away‡	Seven Network	
2008	All Saints	Seven Network	
2008	City Homicide	Seven Network	
2008	McLeod's Daughters	Nine Network	
2008	Neighbours	Network Ten	
2009	Packed to the Rafters‡	Seven Network	
2009	Home and Away	Seven Network	
2009	McLeod's Daughters	Nine Network	
2009	Neighbours	Network Ten	
2009	Underbelly	Nine Network	
2010	Packed to the Rafters‡	Seven Network	
2010	All Saints: Medical Response Unit	Seven Network	
2010	Home and Away	Seven Network	
2010	Neighbours	Network Ten	
2010	Underbelly: A Tale of Two Cities	Nine Network	
2011	Packed to the Rafters‡	Seven Network	
2011	Home and Away	Seven Network	
2011	Neighbours	Network Ten	
2011	Offspring	Network Ten	
2011	Rush	Network Ten	
2011	Underbelly: A Tale of Two Cities	Nine Network	
2012	Packed to the Rafters‡	Seven Network	
2012	Home and Away	Seven Network	
2012	Offspring	Network Ten	
2012	Underbelly: Razor	Nine Network	
2012	Winners & Losers	Seven Network	
2013	House Husbands‡	Nine Network	
2013	Home and Away	Seven Network	
2013	Offspring	Network Ten	
2013	Packed to the Rafters	Seven Network	
2013	Puberty Blues	Network Ten	
2014	Home and Away‡	Seven Network	
2014	House Husbands	Nine Network	
2014	Miss Fisher's Murder Mysteries	ABC1	
2014	Offspring	Network Ten	
2014	Winners & Losers	Seven Network	
2015	Home and Away‡	Seven Network	
2015	House Husbands	Nine Network	
2015	INXS: Never Tear Us Apart	Seven Network	
2015	Love Child	Nine Network	
2015	Offspring	Network Ten	
2016	Home and Away‡	Seven Network	
2016	800 Words	Seven Network	
2016	A Place to Call Home	Soho	
2016	House Husbands	Nine Network	
2016	Love Child	Nine Network	
2017	Molly‡	Seven Network	
2017	800 Words	Seven Network	
2017	Doctor Doctor	Nine Network	
2017	Home and Away	Seven Network	
2017	Offspring	Network Ten	
2017	Wentworth	Showcase	
2018	Wentworth‡	Showcase	
2018	Doctor Doctor	Nine Network	
2018	Home and Away	Seven Network	
2018	Love Child	Nine Network	
2018	Offspring	Network Ten	
2019	Mystery Road‡	ABC	
2019	Doctor Doctor	Nine Network	
2019	Home and Away	Seven Network	
2019	Neighbours	Network Ten	
2019	The Cry	ABC	
2019	Wentworth	Foxtel	
2022	Home and Away‡	Seven Network	
2022	Doctor Doctor	Nine Network	
2022	Love Me	Binge/Foxtel	
2022	RFDS	Seven Network	
2022	The Newsreader	ABC	
2022	Total Control	ABC	
2023	Home and Away‡	Seven Network	
2023	Heartbreak High	Netflix	
2023	Mystery Road: Origin	ABC	
2023	Savage River	ABC	
2023	The Twelve	Binge/Foxtel	
2023	Underbelly: Vanishing Act	Nine Network	

== Multiple wins ==
Number	Program
Wins
9	Home and Away
4	Packed to the Rafters
3	The Sullivans
3	A Country Practice
2	Neighbours
2	Prisoner
2	Police Rescue
2	McLeod's Daughters

== See also ==
- Logie Award for Most Popular Australian Program
