= Agro's Cartoon Connection =

1990–1997 Australian TV series

- Genre: Children's; Variety
- Presented by: Agro; Ann-Maree Biggar (1990–1995); Terasa Livingstone (1995–1997)
- Country of origin: Australia
- Original language: English
- No. of seasons: 9

Production
- Production locations: Brisbane, Queensland (1990–1996); Sydney, New South Wales (1997)
- Running time: 180 minutes (1990–1993); 150 minutes (1994–1996); 90 minutes (1996-1997)

Original release
- Network: Seven Network
- Release: 22 January 1990 – 19 December 1997

Agro's Cartoon Connection is an Australian children's television show that aired on the Seven Network from 1990 to 1997. Shown on weekday mornings, it was primarily hosted by Agro, a puppet played by entertainer Jamie Dunn. It was originally filmed at BTQ7 from 1990 to 1996, after which it moved to ATN7 in 1997.

== History ==
The show's origins can be traced back to Seven's Super Saturday, later becoming The Super Saturday Show in 1989, which only aired on Saturday mornings and was originally only broadcast in Brisbane. It followed on from a show called The Cartoon Connection which had been hosted for many years previously by Michael Horrocks and Alex Wileman, Wileman went on to do New South Wales lottery broadcasts.

The show consisted of playing a variety of cartoons while including small editorials presented between the cartoons in a variety of segments. One such example included Ian Calder appearing in a regular segment acting as a character, one of his more popular being Crikey the Clown where he would walk around the streets of Brisbane in an aggressive manner asking questions to anyone he met. Notably the show's humour was sometimes provocative but always done in a way that would escape the notice of the show's primary audience of children. The program was also criticised in a Federal Parliament committee for including product sponsorship within the program itself.

Over the years the show had a number of co-hosts including Ann-Maree Biggar, Terasa Livingstone, Holly Brisley, Michael R Gibson (who was known to the audience by the nickname "Gibbo") and guest hosts Ian Calder, Trudy Smith and Stacey Thomson.

From 1995, the show fiercely competed with Cheez TV on Network Ten. In an attempt to boost ratings against Cheez TV, Seven replaced Gibson and Thomson with Brad Hills in 1997. In December of that year, Agro and all of the show's hosts were removed, with the programme rebranded simply to Cartoon Connection and only showing cartoons. Cartoon Connection was eventually cancelled in 1999.

Following the show's cancellation, Seven attempted several experiments to revive its breakfast programming for children. Eventually in 2000 Seven shifted the timeslot's focus towards early morning news, occupied by the Sunrise programme instead.

Co-host Michael 'Gibbo' Gibson died on 10 June 2024. Agro performer Jamie Dunn died on 7 March 2026, aged 76.

=== Programming ===
Shows presented during the series' run included G.I. Joe Extreme, The Bots Master, Bob in a Bottle, Mega Man: The Animated Series, Sailor Moon (TV series), Mighty Max (TV series), ThunderCats (1985 TV series), The Jetsons, Toxic Crusaders, James Bond Jr., The Magical Adventures of Quasimodo The New Pink Panther Show Ring Raiders, Hello Kitty's Furry Tale Theater,Scooby-Doo, Magilla Gorilla, Speed Buggy, Space Ghost (TV series), The Smurfs (1981 TV series), Teenage Mutant Ninja Turtles (1987 TV series), Robotech (TV series), A Pup Named Scooby-Doo, ALF Tales, Power Rangers Zeo, The New Yogi Bear Show, Journey to the Heart of the World, Snorks, She-Ra: Princess of Power, Secret Squirrel, The Little Rascals (animated TV series), Huckleberry Hound, The Legend of Prince Valiant, The Brave Frog, Josie and the Pussycats in Outer Space, Gargoyles (TV series), Yogi's Gang, The Adventures of the Galaxy Rangers, Quick Draw McGraw, The Scooby-Doo Show, Scooby-Doo and Scrappy-Doo (1979 TV series), The Little Rascals (animated TV series), The New Fred and Barney Show, The Bots Master, Jin Jin and the Panda Patrol, Casper and the Angels, Captain N: The Game Master, Phantom 2040, Richie Rich (1980 TV series), Tom & Jerry Kids, Tom and Jerry, Bumpety Boo, Top Cat, Galtar and the Golden Lance, The Thirteen Ghosts of Scooby-Doo, SilverHawks, Shirt Tales, The Adventures of Don Coyote and Sancho Panda, Pound Puppies (1986 TV series), The Pebbles and Bamm-Bamm Show, Pancho and Rancho, Robotech (TV series), Mighty Morphin Power Rangers, Bill and Ted: Excellent Adventures, The Perils of Penelope Pitstop, Wacky Races (1968 TV series), The Mask: Animated Series,, Space Strikers,and The Flintstones.

The show also featured many children's movies including Dot Goes to Hollywood, Dennis the Menace in Mayday for Mother, The Little Troll Prince, Race for Your Life, Charlie Brown, Yogi and the Invasion of the Space Bears, The Adventures of the American Rabbit, The Good, the Bad, and Huckleberry Hound, Yabba Dabba Doo! The Happy World of Hanna-Barbera, Top Cat and the Beverly Hills Cats and Scooby-Doo Meets the Boo Brothers.

Christmas specials aired by the show included The Greatest Adventure: Stories from the Bible,Silent Night, Holy Night, Mole's Christmas, and Silent Night, Holy Night (film).

== Cast ==
| Name | Role | Duration |
|---|---|---|
| Jamie Dunn | Agro/Host | 1990–1997 |
| Ann-Maree Biggar | Co-host | 1990–1994 |
| Terasa Livingstone | Reporter | 1994 |
| Terasa Livingstone | Co-host | 1995–1997 |
| Holly Brisley | Reporter | 1995–1997 |
| Ian Calder | Various characters | 1990–1992 |
| Ian Calder | Crikey The Clown | 1991–1997 |
| Michael R Gibson | Gibbo | 1990–1996 |
| Stacey Thomson | Ranger Stacey | 1990–1996 |
| Brad Hills | Reporter | 1997 |

== Awards ==
Awards and nominations for Agro's Cartoon Connection
| Year | Award | Category | Nominee(s) | Result | Ref. |
|---|---|---|---|---|---|
| 1991 | Logie Awards | Most Popular Children's Program | Agro's Cartoon Connection | Won | |
| 1992 | Logie Awards | Most Popular Children's Program | Agro's Cartoon Connection | Won | |
| 1993 | Logie Awards | Most Popular Children's Program | Agro's Cartoon Connection | Won | |
| 1994 | Logie Awards | Most Popular Children's Program | Agro's Cartoon Connection | Won | |
| 1995 | Logie Awards | Most Popular Children's Program | Agro's Cartoon Connection | Won | |
| 1996 | Logie Awards | Most Popular Children's Program | Agro's Cartoon Connection | Won | |
| 1997 | Logie Awards | Most Popular Children's Program | Agro's Cartoon Connection | Won | |

== See also ==
- List of Australian television series
