= The Colony (2005 TV series) =

- Genre: Reality show
- Created by: Chris Hilton
- Directed by: Malcolm Mcdonald
- Narrated by: Jack Thompson
- Composer: James K. Lee
- Country of origin: Australia
- Original language: English

Production
- Producer: Chris Hilton
- Production locations: New South Wales, Australia

Original release
- Network: SBS TV, RTÉ Ireland, History Channel UK
- Release: 26 January 2005

The Colony is a reality television program in which two modern families from Britain and Ireland try to survive in the conditions of New South Wales, Australia, 200 years ago, when it was a penal colony (of the period 1795 to 1815). Together with an Australian family and Aboriginal Australians, they learn just how tough you needed to be to survive.

The series was nominated for the "Most Outstanding Documentary or Documentary Series" in the Logie Awards of 2006.

== Cast ==
=== The English ===
- John Stephenson (41)
- Liz Stephenson (37)
- Carina Stephenson (16)
- Tyler Stephenson (12)

=== The Irish ===
- Maurice Hurley (48)
- Patricia Hurley (45)
- Susan Hurley (18)
- Declan Hurley (18)
- Deirdre Hurley (14)
- Kate Hurley (10)

=== The Australians ===
- Kerry Hohnke (42)
- Tracy Hohnke (37)
- Kashire Hohnke (15)
- Eli Hohnkes (9)
- Linkan Hohnke (5)
- Jakob Hohnke (12)

=== Aboriginal families ===
- Anto Donovan
- Lorna Donovan
- Amber Donovan (9)
- Sharon Costelloe
- Clayton Costelloe (30)
- Kim Costelloe (20)
- Luana Walker (16)
- Jahlow Walker (15)
