= Logie Hall of Fame =

Australian industry-voted TV award

- Country: Australia
- Presented by: TV Week
- First award: 1984; 42 years ago
- Website: www.tvweeklogieawards.com.au

The Logie Hall of Fame is a specialised industry-voted award presented annually at the Australian TV Week Logie Awards. It was first awarded at the 26th Annual TV Week Logie Awards held in 1984. The award is given to recognise the outstanding contribution and achievements of individuals to the Australian television industry such as actors, producers, directors and writers, as well as iconic television programs. The Hall of Fame was revamped in 2026 and expanded to three inductees, which included the first Indigenous person, actress Deborah Mailman, to be inducted. Below is the list of all who have been inducted into the Hall of Fame.

== Recipients ==
Year	Recipient	Reference
1984	Hector Crawford	
1985	Ken G. Hall	
1986	Neil Davis (posthumous)	
1987	Paul Hogan	
1988	Bert Newton	
1989	Bryan Brown	
1990	Johnny Young	
1991	James Davern	
1992	Four Corners	
1993	Reg Grundy	
1994	Bud Tingwell	
1995	Jack Thompson	
1996	Maurie Fields (posthumous)	
1997	Garry McDonald	
1998	Graham Kennedy	
1999	Mike Walsh	
2000	Bruce Gyngell	
2001	Ruth Cracknell	
2002	Mike Willesee	
2003	Don Lane	
2004	Sam Chisholm	
2005	Neighbours	
2006	Play School	
2007	Steve Irwin (posthumous)	
2008	John Clarke	
2009	Bill Collins	
2010	Brian Naylor (posthumous)	
2011	Laurie Oakes	
2012	Molly Meldrum	
2013	Brian Henderson	
2014	Peter Harvey (posthumous)	
2015	Home and Away	
2016	Noni Hazlehurst	
2017	Kerri-Anne Kennerley	
2018	60 Minutes	
2019	Kerry O'Brien	
2022	Bruce McAvaney	
2023	Brian Walsh (posthumous)	
2024	Rebecca Gibney	
2025	Magda Szubanski	
2026	Deborah Mailman	
2026	A Country Practice	
2026	Andrew Denton	

== See also ==
- List of television awards
