= Logie Awards of 1997 =

39th Logie Awards
- Date: 18 May 1997
- Site: Crown Palladium, Melbourne, Victoria
- Hosted by: Daryl Somers

Highlights
- Gold Logie: Lisa McCune
- Hall of Fame: Garry McDonald
- Most awards: Blue Heelers (5)
- Most nominations: Blue Heelers and Home and Away (7)

Television coverage
- Network: Nine Network

The 39th Annual TV Week Logie Awards were presented on 18 May 1997, in a ceremony hosted by Daryl Somers at the Crown Palladium in Melbourne. The ceremony was broadcast on the Nine Network. Guests included Patrick Stewart, Daniel Davis, Laura Innes, David James Elliott, Michael T. Weiss and Ben Elton. Serial dramas Blue Heelers and Home and Away received the most nominations (7), with Blue Heelers winning five of the awards it was nominated for, including the Gold Logie and Most Popular Actress for Lisa McCune. Hey Hey It's Saturday received six nominations and was named Most Popular Light Entertainment Program. Garry McDonald was inducted into the Hall of Fame.

== Nominees and winners ==
The nominations were published in the 26 April 1997 issue of TV Week. Winners are listed first and highlighted in bold.

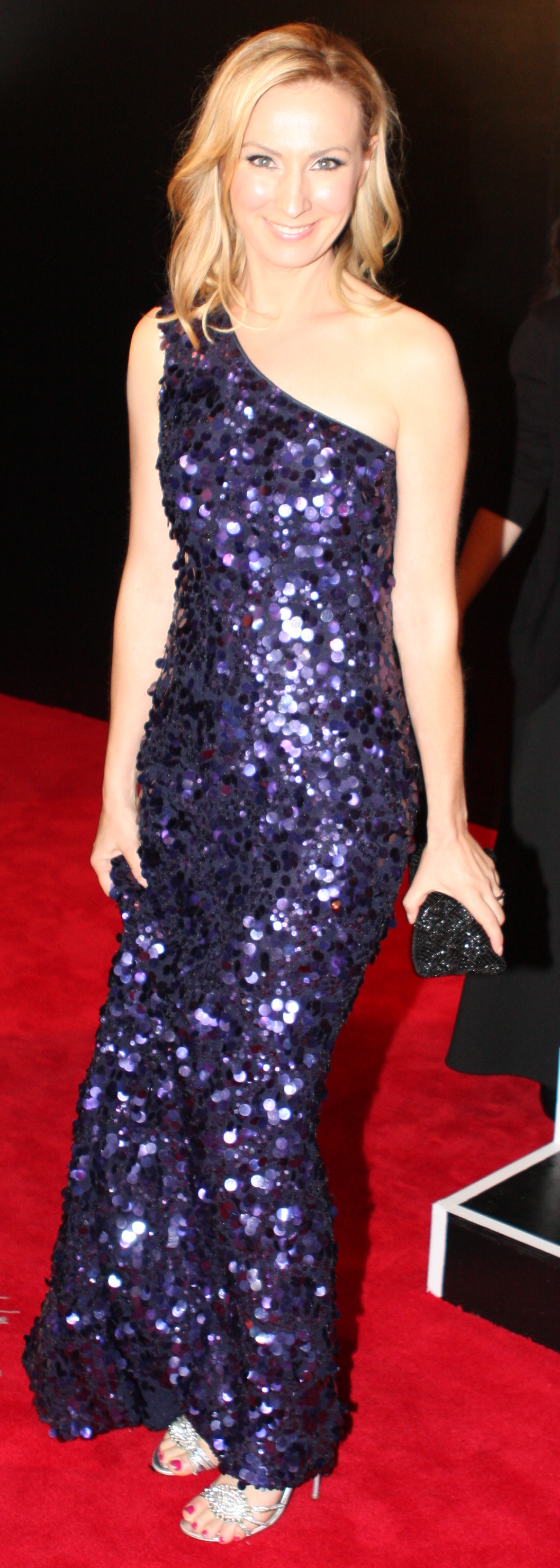
Lisa McCune, Gold Logie and Most Popular Actress winner

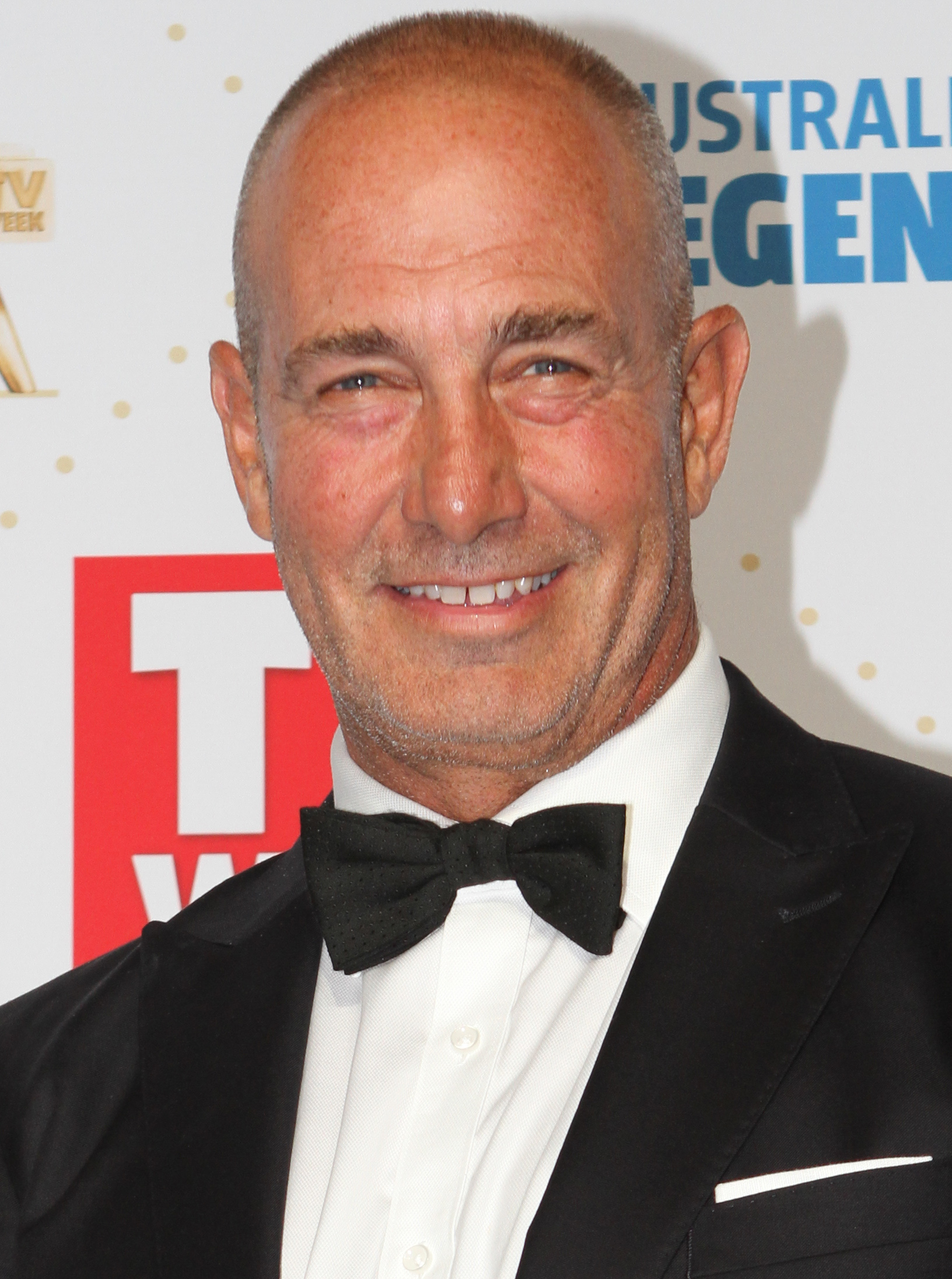
Martin Sacks, Most Popular Actor winner

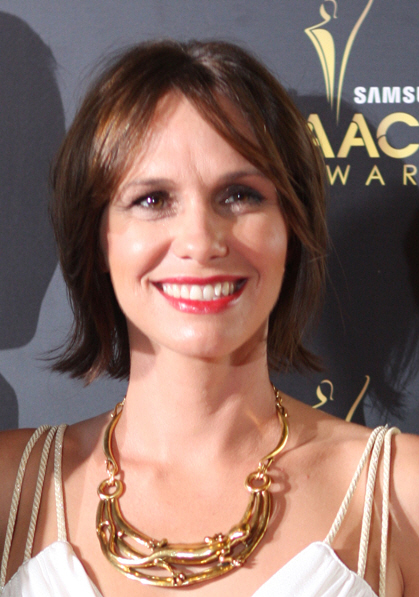
Tasma Walton, Most Popular New Talent winner

=== Gold Logie ===
Gold Logie
**Most Popular Personality on Australian Television**
- **Lisa McCune for Blue Heelers (Seven Network)**
  - Kerri-Anne Kennerley for Midday (Nine Network)
  - Ray Martin for A Current Affair (Nine Network)
  - Daryl Somers for Hey Hey It's Saturday (Nine Network)
  - John Wood for Blue Heelers (Seven Network)

=== Acting and presenting ===
Acting and presenting
**Most Popular Actor**: **Martin Sacks for Blue Heelers (Seven Network)**; Colin Friels for Water Rats (Nine Network); Gary Sweet for Big Sky (Network Ten); Nic Testoni for Home and Away (Seven Network); John Wood for Blue Heelers (Seven Network)	**Most Popular Actress**: **Lisa McCune for Blue Heelers (Seven Network)**; Tempany Deckert for Home and Away (Seven Network); Isla Fisher for Home and Away (Seven Network); Melissa George for Home and Away (Seven Network); Rebecca Gibney Halifax f.p. (Nine Network)
**Most Popular Comedy Personality**: **Eric Bana for Full Frontal (Seven Network)**; Plucka Duck for Hey Hey It's Saturday (Nine Network); Daryl Somers for Hey Hey It's Saturday (Nine Network); Julia Morris for In Melbourne Tonight (Nine Network)	**Most Popular Light Entertainment Personality**: **Daryl Somers for Hey Hey It's Saturday (Nine Network)**; Ernie Dingo for The Great Outdoors (Seven Network); Kerri-Anne Kennerley for Midday (Nine Network); Sam Newman for The Footy Show (Nine Network)
**Most Outstanding Actor**: **Colin Friels for Water Rats (Nine Network)**	**Most Outstanding Actress**: **Alison Whyte for Frontline (ABC TV)**
**Most Popular New Talent In Australia**: **Tasma Walton for Blue Heelers (Seven Network)**; Belinda Emmett for Home and Away (Seven Network); Ben Unwin for Home and Away (Seven Network); Tania Zaetta for Who Dares Wins (Seven Network)

=== Most Popular programs ===
Acting and presenting
**Most Popular Series**: **Blue Heelers (Seven Network)**; Home and Away (Seven Network); Halifax f.p. (Nine Network); Water Rats (Nine Network)	**Most Popular Light Entertainment Program**: **Hey Hey It's Saturday (Nine Network)**; Midday with Kerri-Anne (Nine Network); This Is Your Life (Nine Network); Who Dares Wins (Seven Network)
**Most Popular Comedy Program**: **Full Frontal (Seven Network)**; Australia's Funniest Home Videos (Nine Network); Club Buggery (ABC TV); Hey Hey It's Saturday (Nine Network)	**Most Popular Public Affairs Program**: **A Current Affair (Nine Network)**; 60 Minutes (Nine Network); Today (Nine Network); Today Tonight (Seven Network)
**Most Popular Lifestyle or Information Program**: **Better Homes and Gardens (Seven Network)**; Animal Hospital (Nine Network); Burke's Backyard (Nine Network); The Great Outdoors (Seven Network)	**Most Popular Sports Program**: **The AFL Footy Show (Nine Network)**
**Most Popular Sports Event**: **1996 Atlanta Olympic Games (Seven Network)**	**Most Popular Children's Program**: **Agro's Cartoon Connection (Seven Network)**

=== Most Outstanding Programs ===
Most Outstanding Programs
**Most Outstanding Achievement in Drama Production**: **Water Rats (Nine Network)**	**Most Outstanding Achievement in Public Affairs**: "**The Prisoners Who Waited**", **Sunday (Nine Network)**
**Most Outstanding Documentary**: **Somebody Now – Nobody's Children Seven Years On (ABC TV)**	**Most Outstanding Achievement in News**: "**Port Arthur Massacre**", **ABC News (ABC TV)**
**Most Outstanding Achievement in Comedy**: **Club Buggery (ABC TV)**	**Most Outstanding Achievement in Sport**: **1996 Atlanta Olympic Games – Kieren Perkins 1500m Victory (Seven Network)**

== Performers ==
- Human Nature

== Hall of Fame ==
After a lifetime in Australian television, Garry McDonald became the 14th inductee into the TV Week Logies Hall of Fame.
