= It Takes Two (Australian TV series) =

2006–2008 Australian TV series

- Presented by: Grant Denyer; Terasa Livingstone (Season 1); Kate Ritchie (Season 2); Erika Heynatz (Season 3)
- Opening theme: "It Takes Two" by Marvin Gaye and Kim Weston
- Country of origin: Australia
- Original language: English
- No. of seasons: 3
- No. of episodes: 30

Production
- Running time: approx 90 to 120 minutes per episode (including commercials)

Original release
- Network: Seven Network
- Release: 28 May 2006 – 22 April 2008

It Takes Two was an Australian music talent show, which ran for three seasons from May 2006 to April 2008. It was based on the original UK programme Just the Two of Us.

== Concept ==
The show paired celebrities with professional singers who each week competed against each other in a sing-off to impress a panel of judges and ultimately the viewing public in order to survive potential elimination.

Through both telephone and SMS voting, viewers voted for the duo they thought should remain in the competition. Judges' scores were also taken into account and were combined with the viewer votes when determining which duos stayed and went each week. In all cases, the home viewers always had the final say.

The show was originally referred to in the media as Singing with the Stars, partly because of the similarity in concept to Dancing with the Stars.

Grant Denyer hosted It Takes Two between 2006 and 2008 with a various of female co-hosts such as Terasa Livingstone, Kate Ritchie and the most recent host from the 2008 season Erika Heynatz.

Every season finale ended with all contestants, judges and hosts singing the show's theme song "It Takes Two", originally performed by Marvin Gaye and Kim Weston, and the studio audience and home viewers were encouraged to join in the singing too. By the end of 2008, Seven Network announced that they had no plans for a fourth season.

== On air ==
=== Regular judges ===
- Marina Prior
- James Valentine
- Ross Wilson
- Amanda Pelman

=== Music director ===
- Chong Lim

=== Guest judge ===
- Daryl Braithwaite (Guest judge in season 2)
- Dannii Minogue (Guest judge in season 3)

=== Co-hosts ===
- Erika Heynatz (2008)
- Kate Ritchie (2007)
- Terasa Livingstone (2006)

== Season One (2006) ==
The first season premiered on Sunday 28 May 2006 and concluded on Sunday 6 August 2006. It featured the following celebrities:

Celebrity	Occupation	Professional singer	Genre/s eliminated on	Song/s eliminated on	Placing
Erika Heynatz	Model & television presenter	David Hobson	–	–	Winners on 6 August
Sarah Ryan	Former Olympic swimmer	Guy Sebastian	R&B Pop song	"I Want You Back" by The Jackson 5 "Angels Brought Me Here" by Guy Sebastian	Runners-up on 6 August
Mark Furze	Home and Away cast members	Rachael Beck	Swing Musical	"Can't Take My Eyes Off You" by Frankie Valli "Beauty and the Beast" by Peabo Bryson and Celine Dion	Eliminated 8th on 30 July
Kate Ritchie	Home and Away cast members	Troy Cassar-Daley	Swing	"Route 66" by Sammy Davis, Jr.	Eliminated 7th on 23 July
Richard Champion	Former AFL player	Wendy Matthews	–	"The Power of Love" by Huey Lewis and the News	Eliminated 6th on 16 July
Simon Reeve	Television presenter	Paulini Curuenavuli	Ballad	"Reminiscing" by Little River Band	Eliminated 5th on 9 July
Michael Bevan	Cricketer	Jade MacRae	–	"With or Without You" by U2	Eliminated 4th on 2 July
Kate Fischer	Model & actress	Dave Gleeson	Rock & Roll	"Suspicious Minds" by Elvis Presley	Eliminated 3rd on 25 June
Judy Nunn	Actress & author	Glenn Shorrock	Musicals	"Luck Be a Lady" from Guys and Dolls	Eliminated 2nd on 18 June
Richard Zachariah	Journalist & television presenter	Karen Knowles	Rock	"Gloria" by Van Morrison	Eliminated 1st on 4 June

=== Judges' scores ===
Scorecard
Red numbers indicate the couples with the lowest score for each week.
Green numbers indicate the couples with the highest score for each week.
indicates the couples eliminated that week
indicates the winning couple.
indicates the runner-up couple

EP = Episode
S = Swing, P = Pop, R = Rock, M = Movies/Musicals, R&R = Rock & Roll, N1 = Number Ones, B = Ballad, D = Disco, C = Country, PR = Professional Hit, R&B = R&B, FA = Fast, SL = Slow, J = Journey.

Couple	EP 1	EP 2	EP 3	EP 4	EP 5	EP 6	EP 7	EP 8	EP 9	EP 10
Erika/David	26; P	30; M	31; R&R	34; N1	30; B	32; C	34; R	73; S, R&B	73; PR, D	112; FA, SL, J
Sarah/Guy	25; P	28; M	26; R&R	27; N1	30; D	28; C	33; S	68; R, B	61; PR, R&B	101; FA, SL, J
Mark/Rachael	30; P	23; M	28; R&R	32; N1	31; B	35; D	33; R	71; S, R&B	64; PR, C	
Kate/Troy	24; P	26; M	30; R&B	27; N1	24; B	36; R&R	35; R	66; C, SW		
Richard/Wendy	29; P	23; M	21; R&B	25; N1	25; D	32; R&R	28; C			
Simon/Paulini	25; S	30; R	29; R&B	22; N1	30; D	25; B				
Michael/Jade	25; S	23; R	28; R&B	24; N1	29; C					
Kate/Dave	20; S	22; R	24; R&R	22; N1						
Judy/Glenn	27; P	27; M	23; R&B							
Richard/Karen	16; S	18; R								

Erika Heynatz and her partner David Hobson were eventually declared the winners, defeating Sarah Ryan and her partner, Guy Sebastian.

=== Average chart ===
This chart is based on the celebrities averages and not their place in the competition.

Rank by average	Competition finish	Couple	Total	Number of performances	Average
1	1	Erika & David	475	14	33.9
2	2	Sarah & Guy	427	14	30.5
3	4	Kate & Troy	269	9	29.9
4	3	Mark & Rachael	314	11	28.5
5	6	Simon & Paulini	161	6	26.8
6	5	Richard & Wendy	183	8	26.1
7	7	Michael & Jade	129	5	25.8
8	9	Judy & Glenn	77	3	25.7
9	8	Kate & David	88	4	22.0
10	10	Richard & Karen	34	2	17.0

=== Season summary ===
- There was no episode broadcast on 11 June due to the Seven Network's coverage of a rugby union international between Australia and England, therefore there were no contestant eliminations for that week.
- On 23 July, Larry Emdur was the fill-in host for Grant Denyer. This was due to Denyer's commitments in the second tier of the V8 Supercars series.
- Nick Lachey was a special guest in the grand finale on 6 August, who performed "What's Left of Me".

== Season Two (2007) ==
The second season premiered on Tuesday, 8 May 2007 and concluded on Tuesday, 10 July 2007. It featured the following celebrities:

Celebrity	Occupation	Professional singer	Genre/s eliminated on	Song/s eliminated on	Placing
Jolene Anderson	All Saints actress	David Campbell	–	–	Winners on 10 July
Jo Stanley	Radio broadcaster	Anthony Callea	Rock 'n' Roll; Professional Hit	"Johnny B. Goode" by Chuck Berry "The Prayer" by Celine Dion and Andrea Bocelli	Runners-up on 10 July
Mimi Macpherson	Environmentalist & television presenter	David Hobson	Swing; Movies	"My Baby Just Cares for Me" by Nina Simone "Hanky Panky" by Madonna	Eliminated 8th on 3 July
Ernie Dingo	The Great Outdoors presenter	Rachael Beck	Rock	"Solid Rock" by Goanna	Eliminated 7th on 26 June
Daniel Kowalski	Former Olympic swimmer	Kate Ceberano	The 80s	"Walking on Sunshine" by Eddy Grant	Eliminated 6th on 19 June
Bob Morley	Home and Away & The 100 actor	Jade MacRae	70s & 80s	"Hold the Line" by Toto	Eliminated 5th on 12 June
Julia Zemiro	Comedian & television presenter	Dave Gleeson	Rock & Roll	"Jailhouse Rock" by Elvis Presley	Eliminated 4th on 5 June
Russell Gilbert	Comedian	Wendy Matthews	Number One Hits	"Play That Funky Music" by Wild Cherry	Eliminated 3rd on 29 May
Krystal Forscutt	Zoo Weekly columnist & model	Troy Cassar-Daley	Ballad	"Heaven" by Bryan Adams	Eliminated 2nd on 22 May
Lochie Daddo	Actor & television presenter	Paulini Curuenavuli	Swing	"Come Fly with Me" by Frank Sinatra	Eliminated 1st on 15 May

=== Judges' scores ===
Celebrity/Singing partners	Week 1	Week 2	Week 3	Week 4	Week 5	Week 6^{1}	Week 7	Week 8^{2}	Week 9^{2}	Week 10^{3}
Jolene Anderson/David Campbell	32	30	33	36	37	45	40	78	75	115
Jo Stanley/Anthony Callea	30	28	33	30	33	40	28	63	74	105
Mimi Macpherson/David Hobson	28	19	26	23	24	35	28	61	69	
Ernie Dingo/Rachael Beck	26	26	28	27	22	37	33	61		
Daniel Kowalski/Kate Ceberano	20	28	30	33	28	40	31			
Bobby Morley/Jade MacRae	26	26	24	30	28	37				
Julia Zemiro/Dave Gleeson	22	27	28	33	31					
Russell Gilbert/Wendy Matthews	27	31	31	27						
Krystal Forscutt/Troy Cassar-Daley	23	30	26							
Lochie Daddo/Paulini Curuenavuli	22	20								

^{1}Week 6 featured a guest judge (Daryl Braithwaite), and scores were out of 50.
^{2}Contestants in weeks 8 & 9 performed two songs, resulting with two scores out of 40, and added to out of 80.
^{3}Contestants in the grand finale performed three songs, with three scores out of 40, and added out of 120.

=== Average chart ===
This chart is based on the celebrities averages and not their place in the competition.

Rank by average	Competition finish	Couple	Total	Number of performances	Average
1	1	Jolene & David	512	14	36.6
2	2	Jo & Anthony	456	14	32.3
3	8	Russell & Wendy	116	4	29.0
4	5	Daniel & Kate	202	7	28.9
5	7	Julia & David	141	5	28.2
6	4	Ernie & Rachael	253	9	28.1
7	3	Mimi & David	306	11	27.8
8	6	Bobby & Jade	164	6	27.3
9	9	Krystal & Troy	79	3	26.3
10	10	Lochie & Paulini	42	2	21.0

=== Season summary ===
- It was reported that celebrities Laura Csortan and Candice Falzon also auditioned, but were turned down for a "lack of basic singing ability".
- Kate Ritchie, a contestant in season one, also replaced Terasa Livingstone as co-host for this season.
- New singing partners included Anthony Callea, David Campbell and Kate Ceberano, replacing Guy Sebastian, Glenn Shorrock and Karen Knowles.
- On 15 May, Larry Emdur was the fill-in host for Grant Denyer. In this episode, Kate Ritchie made a comment that when he was the host last time, she got voted out from last season.
- On 12 June, the show featured a guest judge, Daryl Braithwaite.
- On 26 June, the show featured a special guest, Canadian singer Michael Bublé who sang a few songs from his new album, Call Me Irresponsible.

== Season Three (2008) ==
The third and final season of It Takes Two commenced on Tuesday, 12 February 2008 and concluded on Tuesday, 22 April 2008. Erika Heynatz, winner of the show's first season was the new co-host alongside Grant Denyer. Here's all the celebrities featured in the final season:

Celebrity	Occupation	Professional singer	Genre/s eliminated on	Song/s eliminated on	Placing
Julia Morris	Television presenter	David Hobson	–	–	Winners on 22 April
Russell Robertson	AFL player	Kate Ceberano	Fast; Slow; Journey	"Can't Buy Me Love" by The Beatles "Don't Let the Sun Go Down on Me" by Elton John "Home" by Michael Bublé	Runner Up on 22 April
Virginia Gay	All Saints actress	Ian Moss	Rock; Professional Hit	"One" by U2 "Tucker's Daughter" by Ian Moss	Eliminated 8th on 15 April
Paul O'Brien	Home and Away actor	Jade MacRae	Swing	"Mack the Knife" by Bobby Darin	Eliminated 7th on 8 April
Candice Falzon	Ironwoman	Anthony Callea	Rock	"Hook Me Up" by The Veronicas	Eliminated 6th on 1 April
Sara Groen	Seven News weather presenter	Adam Harvey	Disco	"Can't Get Enough of Your Love, Babe" by Barry White	Eliminated 5th on 25 March
Chloe Maxwell	Television presenter	David Campbell	80s	"Crazy For You" by Madonna	Eliminated 4th on 11 March
Scott Draper	Professional tennis player & golfer	Ricki-Lee Coulter	Ballad	"How Am I Supposed to Live Without You" by Michael Bolton	Eliminated 3rd on 4 March
Mark Wilson	Dancing with the Stars judge	Rachael Beck	Country	"9 to 5" by Dolly Parton	Eliminated 2nd on 26 February
John Mangos	Sky News Australia anchor	Wendy Matthews	Pop	"You Are the Sunshine of My Life" by Stevie Wonder	Eliminated 1st on 19 February

=== Judges' scores ===
Celebrity/Singing partners	Week 1	Week 2	Week 3	Week 4	Week 5^{1}	Week 6	Week 7	Week 8^{2}	Week 9^{2}	Week 10^{3}
Julia Morris/David Hobson	29	32	35	33	38	32	35	67	69	117
Russell Robertson/Kate Ceberano	31	32	33	33	36	36	33	70	72	109
Virginia Gay/Ian Moss	35	32	34	31	32	33	38	75	69	
Paul O'Brien/Jade MacRae	22	25	19	22	23	19	30	59		
Candice Falzon/Anthony Callea	24	28	28	29	33	29	28			
Sara Groen/Adam Harvey	30	27	23	30	27	31				
Chloe Maxwell/David Campbell	29	29	29	32	28					
Scott Draper/Ricki-Lee Coulter	28	31	30	27						
Mark Wilson/Rachael Beck	27	31	22							
John Mangos/Wendy Matthews	21	24								

^{1}Week 5 featured a guest judge (Dannii Minogue), and scores were still out of 40. She replaced Ross Wilson for the week, as he was unable to attend.
^{2}Contestants in weeks 8 & 9 performed two songs, resulting with two scores out of 40, and added to out of 80.
^{3}Contestants in the grand finale will perform three songs, with three scores out of 40, and added out of 120.

=== Average chart ===
This chart is based on the celebrities averages and not their place in the competition.

Rank by average	Competition finish	Couple	Total	Number of performances	Average
1	1	Julia & David	487	14	34.8
2	2	Russell & Kate	485	14	34.6
3	3	Virginia & Ian	379	11	34.5
4	7	Chloe & David	147	5	29.4
5	8	Scott & Ricki Lee	116	4	29.0
6	5	Candice & Anthony	199	7	28.4
7	6	Sara & Adam	168	6	28.0
8	9	Mark & Rachael	80	3	26.7
9	4	Paul & Jade	219	9	24.3
10	10	John & Wendy	45	2	22.5

=== Season summary ===
- Despite being turned down for a lack of basic singing ability in Season 2, ironwoman Candice Falzon is one of the contestants in Season 3.
- New singing partners in this season are Ricki-Lee Coulter, Ian Moss and Adam Harvey, replacing Paulini Curuenavuli, Dave Gleeson and Troy Cassar-Daley.
- Kate Ritchie declined to return for the third season of the show.
- Scott Draper, Mark Wilson, Julia Morris, John Mangos, and Russell Robertson appeared on the Deal or No Deal – It Takes Two special, which also aired on the Seven Network during the week of 3 February 2008.
- On 18 March 2008, a countdown special of It Takes Two aired for one hour highlighting each singing duos journey the final six have had throughout their stint in Season 3. Hence, no live performances were aired, therefore no contestant was eliminated that week.
- Dannii Minogue performed her version of disco track Xanadu (Olivia Newton-John and Electric Light Orchestra song) on an episode of this season.

== Ratings ==
Season 1 was a hit for the Seven Network, providing them with solid numbers post 7:30 pm, where on a Sunday; Seven had little success up against the Nine Network's 60 Minutes, and Big Brother and Australian Idol on Network Ten.

Season 2 moved to a new night and time in 2007: 7:30 pm Tuesdays, airing in the slot usually occupied by the highly successful Dancing with the Stars. The premiere ranked third for the night, averaging 1.5 million viewers, behind Seven's news programming and ahead of a special extended edition of Nine's 20 to 1 episode "Great Movie One-Liners". The show managed to stay in the top 3 of the rating, and proved to be very successful for the Seven Network.

In Season 3, with only one season of Dancing with the Stars to air later in 2008, It Takes Two was moved to February, however retained the highly successful timeslot of 7:30 pm on Tuesdays.
