= Real Life (TV program) =

Australian current affairs television program

- Genre: Current affairs
- Presented by: Stan Grant
- Starring: Eric Walters, Jane Hansen, David White, Peter Charley, Edwina Gatenby
- Country of origin: Australia
- Original language: English
- No. of seasons: 3

Production
- Running time: 23 minutes

Original release
- Network: Seven Network
- Release: 20 January 1992 – 1 December 1994

Related
- Today Tonight (1995–2019)

Real Life is an Australian current affairs television program that aired on the Seven Network from 20 January 1992 to 1 December 1994.

Its format was similar to other tabloid current affairs shows airing at the time, these being A Current Affair and Hinch, which had recently been axed by the Seven Network and picked up by Network Ten. It was mainly presented by Stan Grant and the reporters included former Network Ten newsreader Eric Walters and Edwina Gatenby.

While generally not being as successful as its Nine competitor, it was popular enough for Nine to install Ray Martin as the host of A Current Affair in 1994 and it did win the Logie Award for Most Popular Current Affairs Program in that year. In 1995, the show was replaced with Today Tonight, a state-based current affairs program as opposed to Real Life which was a nationally airing show.
