= Stacey Thomson =

Australian television presenter (born 1964)

- Born: 27 August 1964 (age 62); Brisbane, Queensland, Australia
- Other name: Ranger Stacey
- Occupations: Television presenter, veterinarian
- Years active: 1992-present
- Television: Totally Wild
- Spouse: Rob McCall
- Children: 2

Stacey Thomson (born 27 August 1964) is an Australian television presenter.

== Career ==
Thomson is a host on the long-running nature and science themed series Totally Wild and has been with the show since its premiere in 1992. She is often introduced as Ranger Stacey.

Formerly a ranger and spokeswoman for the Queensland Parks and Wildlife Service, Thomson has also appeared on Celebrity Big Brother, Wombat, Agro's Cartoon Connection, Rove Live and Celebrity Name Game.

In 2017, Stacey celebrated 25 years of Totally Wild.
