= Terasa Livingstone =

Australian actress

- Born: 9 April 1975 (age 51); Benowa, Queensland, Australia
- Occupations: Film and television actress; theatre performer; television presenter; children's host; reporter
- Years active: 1993−present
- Known for: Agro's Cartoon Connection; Reporter on The Great Outdoors

Terasa Livingstone (born 9 April 1975) is an Australian theatre, film and television actress, TV presenter and children's host. She lives in Los Angeles with her husband, fellow Australian actor Wil Traval.

== Career ==
She began her career as a roving reporter for Agro's Cartoon Connection on the Seven Network, eventually taking over the role of co-host from Ann-Maree Biggar in 1995. She also served as a reporter for Seven's The Great Outdoors. In the late 1990s she moved to the United States, appearing in several minor roles including the 2005 film Circadian Rhythm and a part on the first season finale of Lost. She has also posed for the men's magazines FHM, Inside Sport, and in 1998 appeared nude for the art magazine Black+White alongside former fiancée Jamie Durie.

In 2006 she hosted the Australian celebrity singing competition It Takes Two with Grant Denyer.
