= Tonight Live with Steve Vizard =

Nightly Australian television comedy chat show

- Created by: Artist Services
- Starring: Steve Vizard
- Country of origin: Australia
- No. of episodes: Approx 1,000

Production
- Running time: 60 minutes
- Production company: Artist Services

Original release
- Network: Seven Network
- Release: 29 January 1990 – 26 November 1993

Tonight Live with Steve Vizard was a nightly Australian comedy chat show broadcast on Seven Network in Australia, featuring live musical performances.

== Synopsis ==
Tonight Live was an hourlong studio-based program broadcast nationally five nights a week from 29 January 1990 to 26 November 1993, usually commencing at 10:30 pm every weeknight. Presented by Australian lawyer turned comedian and writer Steve Vizard, the show's format was an eclectic mix of a traditional late night talk show, in the vein of US programs The Tonight Show or The Late Show, with more off-beat, often deconstructionist elements, such as broadcasting a rehearsal of the show, a rained out show, a parallel Tonight Show, using the floor manager and cameramen as on air talent, using the studio audience to replace high-profile guests and the like.

== Awards ==
The show won the late night ratings around Australia and won several awards, Television Society Awards, and Logie Awards, including the 1991 Gold Logie for host Steve Vizard as Most Popular Person on Australian Television, Vizard was also nominated on three other occasions.

== Guest star appearances ==
One of the main features or fixtures of the show was the diversity of its guest stars, with both local and international personalities featuring. An average show featured at least three interviews with often unexpected disclosures. Over the show's history, in excess of 2,000 guests appeared on Tonight Live With Steve Vizard.

Some of the best known guests included Peter Allen, Steve Allen, Jeffrey Archer, Michael Aspel, Neil Aspinall, Anita Baker, Kathy Bates, David Bellamy, George Benson, Cilla Black, Deborah Blando, Lothaire Bluteau, John Bluthal, Victor Borge, Daryl Braithwaite, Marlon Brando, Michael Caine, Chevy Chase, Julian Clary, Jackie Collins, Pauline Collins, Phil Collins, Harry Connick Jr., Alice Cooper, Cindy Crawford, Russell Crowe, Billy Crystal, Macaulay Culkin, Jamie Lee Curtis, Charles Dance, Edward de Bono, Gérard Depardieu, Phyllis Diller, Kirk Douglas, Michael Douglas, Robert Downey Jr., Duran Duran, Sheena Easton, Clint Eastwood, Britt Ekland, Ben Elton, Gloria Estefan, Emilio Estevez, John Farnham, Sally Field, Joe Frazier, Bob Geldof, Mel Gibson, Whoopi Goldberg, Jill Goodacre, Elliott Gould, Jerry Hall, Daryl Hannah, Rolf Harris, Debbie Harry, Goldie Hawn, Audrey Hepburn, Bob Hope, Whitney Houston, Barry Humphries, Natalie Imbruglia, Jeremy Irons, Billy Joel, Elton John, Quincy Jones, Tom Jones, B. B. King, Kris Kristofferson, Cleo Laine, Don Lane, k.d. lang, Angela Lansbury, Rob Lowe, Robert Ludlum, Shirley MacLaine, Elle Macpherson, George Martin, Colleen McCullough, Malcolm McDowell, MC Hammer, Leo McKern, Craig McLachlan, Bette Midler, Kylie Minogue, Mark Mitchell, Rex Mossop, Sam Neill, Bert Newton, Olivia Newton-John, Brigitte Nielsen, Nick Nolte, Peter O'Toole, Guy Pearce, Gregory Peck, Priscilla Presley, Bonnie Raitt, Lou Rawls, Lynn Redgrave, Oliver Reed, Burt Reynolds, Debbie Reynolds, Denise Richards, Tim Robbins, Mickey Rooney, Diana Ross, Kurt Russell, Bob Saget, Alexei Sayle, Fred Schepisi, Harry Secombe, Bob Seger, Jane Seymour, Martin Sheen, Spinal Tap, Stevie Starr, Oliver Stone, Patrick Swayze, John Thaw, Frank Thring, Tiny Tim, Sir Peter Ustinov, Dionne Warwick, Peter Weir, Kim Wilde, Robin Williams, John Williamson, Stevie Wonder, John Paul Young, ZZ Top, and various prime ministers and politicians.

The first major guest on the first show was Peter Allen.

On the third night, Kylie Minogue was on the show. She mentioned that she thought it was a dream because everything looked like Letterman, but there was no Dave.

In 1990, Milli Vanilli, later to be embroiled in a lip-synching scandal, appeared and appeared to sing and Vizard complimented them on how well they had "sung". The miming scandal broke the next day.

Occasionally, Vizard fell asleep on the show, most memorably during his interview with Australian fashion designer Pru Acton. Vizard asked Acton a question requiring a considerable answer, during which he nodded off only to be woken by the band played off to a commercial break.

Vizard often entertained his guest before the show at a nearby restaurant in Melbourne, Lynch's, and often a member of the crew had to race to the restaurant to retrieve Vizard and his guests so that they would not miss the start of the show. On several occasions the show was starting as Vizard entered the studio.

In a 1991 episode, Vizard, actor Gérard Depardieu and film director Peter Weir were dining at Lynch's before the show. After sampling the local wines they raced back for the show, and on air, Gérard Depardieu, insisted on opening bottles of Grange, which he and Vizard drank on air.

Agro, a puppet who frequently uses sexual innuendo and adult humor, was one of the most popular guests and guest hosts with both the audience and Vizard himself.

Eric Bana was given his first break on Tonight Live.

In 1992, Paula Yates stood in as guest host. The same night her husband Bob Geldof was the surprise guest and conducted a surreal interview over satellite.

== Music ==
Tonight Live featured its own in house band, for the first three years, The Groovematics, a jazz band led by renowned jazz pianist and composer Paul Grabowsky. Vizard and Grabowsky had been friends since their studies at University of Melbourne and Vizard referred to Grabowsky as "the Count". Every episode featured at least one live performance of local and internationally acclaimed musicians generally accompanied by the Count and the Groovematics. Some of the musicians who appeared on the show included Stephan Grappelli, Harry Connick Jr. and his Big Band, George Benson, ZZ Top, Rory Gallagher, Randy Crawford, Spinal Tap, Buddy Guy, Duran Duran, Cilla Black, Tom Jones, Lou Rawls, Cleo Laine, Alice Cooper, Dionne Warwick, John Williamson, B. B. King, Phil Collins, John Farnham, Kylie Minogue and Southern Sons.

== News and weather ==
One of the Seven Network's requirement for the show was that it contain a small news update. This was presented by Jennifer Keyte in the first three years, who Vizard called the "Hostess with the Mostess". Naomi Robson was the newsreader in later years. The news also included a weather segment, traditionally not the most compelling television. On Tonight Live, high-profile guests were used to present the weather including Bob Geldof, Ben Elton, Kylie Minogue, The Georgian Knife Throwers, and Australian businessman and entrepreneur Dick Smith.

== Stunts, pranks and mishaps ==
Some of the most memorable moments on Tonight Live were those that were unscripted and unexpected, many of which may not have gone to air except that the show was live.

• In 1991 Tonight Live was "rained out". Wimbledon, the tennis tournament, was broadcast live on a competing network had been rained out again. Vizard claimed that his Tonight Show had been rained out too, and using special effects, created the effects of rain in the studio, the crew wandering around in wet weather gear sweeping water from the covers, and guests in the control room looking forward to the rain easing so they could get out there.

• In 1991, Mr Lifto, from the freakish Jim Rose Circus Sideshow, had multiple piercings and hung concrete blocks from his nipples, suitcases from his ears, and an iron from his penis. The modesty screen erected around Mr Lifto could not hide his elongated member as he started swinging the iron, which was accidentally broadcast live to a national TV audience. The network demanded the nude segment be removed before the show was telecast in the western states. Vizard, always looking to cause sensation, replayed the Mr Liftos nudity again the following night, and once more in slow motion.

• In the 1990 Australian Federal election Vizard nominated one of the show's writers, Mitchell Faircloth, (a.k.a. Slim Whittle from the Whittle Family) as a Senate candidate in Western Australia. Mitchell used the show to make policy speeches and a camera followed him on the hustings.

• On one show Vizard asked the studio audience if any of them had tattoos and a large man took off his shirt and revealed a back covered in ink. A member of the Victorian Police Major Crime Squad was watching the show at home and recognized the tattooed man from his tattoos as a wanted criminal, and arrived at the studio and arrested the criminal before the show was over.

• One night the show consisted entirely of footage that had obviously been recorded during a rehearsal. This resulted in many unrefined moments being put to air, including liberal use of swear words. The broadcast ended with the countdown that usually heralded the moments immediately preceding a live broadcast.

• During a filmed visit to London, Vizard boards a randomly selected London taxi to interview the driver. The driver reveals himself as Tony Walker, one of the original Seven Up participants who since their childhood were interviewed every seven years about the progress of their lives.

• Vizard had a television set installed on the host set so that he could turn over at any time and see what Tonight Live was up against on the other stations. When Tonight Live found itself up against a good match from Wimbledon, he would swing over the TV on his set to let the viewers watch the match and know the score.

• To celebrate his 100th episode Vizard hosted a dinner party in which he invited stars and Seven Network executives to the Studio and broadcast it live.

• A lottery show, in which all of the guests and segments in the show were allocated different numbers; a machine was used to randomly select the order and elements of the show.

• One stunt that caused immense trouble with the network and their star current affair host, Derryn Hinch, was when Vizard incited Terry Willesee, a guest, to brick up the door to Derryn Hinch's dressing room.

• In an episode that confused the audience and angered the network, Vizard broadcast in its entirety for one hour the amateur uncut wedding video of one of the members of the crew who had recently been married.

• The show purchased and trained its own greyhound which it raced under the name Tonight Live.

• On one episode a genuine wedding of an audience member including a stag party and reception was squeezed into one hour.

• For one week, Vizard ran a segment called Nudie Hobbies, in which actors demonstrated different hobbies such as stamp collecting and scrabble in the nude. The public outrage was reflected in warnings from the network. Unbeknownst to the network, Vizard had a bet to get the ratings up to 20 and Nudie Hobbies won his bet.

• The show included an on-set fax machine (at the time the show ran these were just becoming popular) and Vizard regularly read out viewer faxes and rang viewers from the phone on his desk. Occasionally he asked viewers to come into the studio, on several occasions asking for pizzas to be delivered to the studio audience, for takeaway Chinese to be delivered and even for a masseur to attend to massage one of his guests.

• When the set was renovated in 1991, Vizard replaced the guest chairs with different chairs each night. One night, a dentists chair was used for guests and Eddie Fisher, the singer and Father of Carrie Fisher, was interviewed in the dentists chair and given a free dental check up at the same time.

• On the week of the first show, Channel 7's parent company Qintex had just been placed in receivership and Vizard joked in that maiden show "Welcome to Tonight Live, or item number 731 in the Qintex catalogue."

• When guest hosts appeared, Vizard's voice would announce that they would be 'playing the role of Mister Stephen Vizard', reinforcing a concept that he had mentioned at the time, that he saw his on-screen persona as a character.

== Outside broadcasts and non-studio shows ==
Tonight Live often left the studio, sometimes without any planning, and broadcast from the street, suburbs and often bizarre locations. The show was often broadcast for a week at a time from remote locations such as London, New York, Spain, Sydney, the Great Barrier Reef, a bowling alley, an aircraft carrier, Vizard's home and an Italian viewers backyard barbecue.

One show was broadcast from an open top convertible driving around St. Kilda. Prostitutes were picked up. Japanese Tourists were given a guided tour of the city.

Another show was hosted by Vizard on the back of a motorcycle being ridden through the city by World Motorcycle champion Mick Doohan.

Another show was broadcast from on board a tram as it trundled around Melbourne.

Against expert advice, Tonight Live broadcast one episode in 1992 from maximum security of Pentridge Prison in the inner northern Melbourne suburb of Coburg. The show was broadcast from the notorious H-Division, the area of the jail where the hard men were housed and featured attractive women including Dannii Minogue and Ally Fowler, performing before the many convicted murderers in the 70 person prison audience.

In 1992, Tonight Live broadcast from London for a week, each show from a different location. One London episode from the dining room at London's Ritz Hotel starred UK talk show hosts Terry Wogan, Michael Parkinson, Ben Elton, Alexi Sayle, Joanna Lumley, Kylie Minogue, Michael Caine and Jane Seymour.

Another UK episode was broadcast from a Village in the Cotswolds and featured Oliver Reed who arrived drunk and dishevelled, went on camera and began to tell X-rated stories of his time in the British SAS, including one about the eagle that was tattooed on his penis.

Another episode from the Duke of Malboroughs ancestral home, Blenheim Palace, featured Spike Milligan and Gary Glitter. The show broadcast the near- death of show regular Glenn Robbins who was flying overhead in a two-seater ultra light aircraft at about 2000 feet, when his scarf became caught in the single propeller. The resulting crash landing in the Blenheim lake was broadcast live across Australia.

In a 1992 show from Barcelona, Spain, Vizard's crew surprised him by arranging for him to fight a bull. Vizard dressed in his matador outfit which had been rented from The State Opera's production of Carmen, and was bright red. The bull took one look at Vizard and attacked him and Vizard ran.

== On-air family and regulars ==
Tonight Live established an "on-air family" which included Dutchman Jack Degenkamp, the world's oldest cameraman. Jack gave tips on clog dancing, demonstrated levitation and even delivered a Christmas message on the last show of the year. In 1993 he was the subject of a Tonight Live special : Jack Degekamp, This Is Your Life.

Merv Ford, the floor manager, was also used on air. Merv's popularity was such that when he was working as floor manager for Seven's coverage of the Australian Open Tennis he was recognised by the crowd more often than some of the players. Ford suffered a minor on-air injury when Vizard threw a dart at a street directory he was holding, inadvertently going into Merv's finger.

Other on air regulars included Paul Grabowsky the band leader. Later, a young red-headed floor manager named Dane Clarke would fill in for Merv and feature in stunts.

Another on air regular was a member of the production staff, Leanne Rollins (AKA Leanne from Yarck) who worked in the Tonight Live office. On the second show a guest pulled out at the last minute, so Leanne was roped in show and told stories and showed pictures of her father's donkey, which happened to be in a state or arousal when the photo was taken.

Tonight Live always had a stand-by guest in case someone failed to turn up who for the first three months of the show was historian Magnus Clarke who was an expert in international affairs and who got made up and sat in the green room every night for months on the off chance that a guest did not show.

Other regulars included Philip Brady, a great Australian entertainer and one of the pioneers of Australian television, appeared on Tonight Live almost weekly in the first year because he made Vizard laugh. Glenn Robbins, Steve Bedwell and many others appeared regularly.

== Impact and controversy ==
Tonight Live was a substantial ratings and revenue success for the Seven Network at a time when the network was in difficulty and had just gone into receivership. The show extended prime time revenues into late night and generated substantial revenues for the network.Tonight Live dominated the ratings around Australia in every year of its broadcast. For the year 1990, the Nielsen ratings surveys reported that Tonight Live gained an average viewer share of 42.6% of viewers in all households in Australia (nearly double Channel 9 at 26% and Network 10 at 20%). In 1991 it won with an average share of 35%. In 1992, it won with an average share of 32.24%. In 1993, it won with an average share of 31.22%.

Tonight Live was originally commissioned to take on the dominating late night show on its competitor Nine Network, Graham Kennedy's Coast to Coast at 10.30pm Monday to Friday. Coast to Coast was co-hosted by journalist John Mangos who had replaced previous co-host Ken Sutcliffe. When Seven announced they were putting up Tonight Live against Coast to Coast, Kennedy announced that he would not be continuing the next year.

In later years, Tonight Live featured a Friday night guest host, usually Richard Stubbs. Vizard enjoyed taking nights off and more than 100 guest hosts were tried including Agro, Ben Elton, Bob Geldof, Paula Yates, Ronnie Corbett, Glenn Robbins and John Singleton.

In the last two years of the show, up to two nights per week were pretaped. This became the subject of complaints (similar claims about broadcast such as sports events being 'live' despite being taped and broadcast hours later are often made on Australian television). At one point the show's broadcast carried a message disclaiming that the show was 'live'.

Tonight Live was broadcast live from the Seven studios on Dorcas Street, South Melbourne, Victoria, Studios numbered 7 and 8. Shows produced from there include, Dancing with the Stars, Rove, The Bert Newton Show and Blue Heelers. After Tonight Live finished, the set from Tonight Live was donated to RMITV with which to produce television shows for C31. Owing to a critical lack of resources at C31, the set elements have been reused and repainted for many shows over many years and are still in frequent use many years after Tonight Live went off the air.
