= Ann-Maree Biggar =

Australian television presenter

- Born: 19 June 1967 (age 59); Brisbane, Queensland, Australia
- Occupation: television presenter
- Years active: 1988–present
- Known for: Agro's Cartoon Connection

Ann-Maree Biggar (born 19 June 1967) is an Australian television presenter.

== Career ==
Biggar's career began in 1988 at World Expo 88 on a show called The Breaky Bash with Sean James as commander Super K and his robot dog K9 and Brett.

In 1989, Biggar began hosting the children's morning program Agro's Cartoon Connection. She remained on the show for a number of years, finishing up at the end of the 1995 season, before being replaced by Terasa Livingstone

In 1994 and 1995, she became a reporter on the travel show The Great Outdoors. This was followed by a move to the Nine Network as a regular on a relaunched version of In Melbourne Tonight with Frankie J. Holden.

In 2000, she became a reporter on Network Ten's morning show Good Morning Australia. After the program ended at the end of 2005, she joined the replacement show 9am with David & Kim, where she was also a reporter. She remained on the show until 2009.
