= Harry's Practice =

- Genre: Lifestyle
- Presented by: Harry Cooper (host); Katrina Warren; Chris Brown
- Country of origin: Australia
- Original language: English
- No. of seasons: 7

Production
- Camera setup: Video (1997–2003); HD video (filmized) (2003)
- Running time: 30 minutes (including commercials)
- Production company: Red Heart Entertainment (2001)

Original release
- Network: Seven Network
- Release: 2 December 1997 – 23 August 2003

Harry's Practice is an Australian lifestyle television program that was broadcast on the Seven Network between 1997 and 2003.

The show was hosted by Harry Cooper, who provided advice for pet care. The show also featured Katrina Warren and Chris Brown as presenters. Cooper currently is involved with Better Homes and Gardens, a television program, in which he performs similar show segments as to that previously seen on Harry's Practice.

The show is commonly repeated during the late night, early morning hours on the Seven Network and 7two.

== See also ==
- List of Seven Network programs
- List of Australian television series
