= Renovation Rescue =

- Country of origin: Australia
- No. of episodes: 13

Original release
- Network: Nine Network
- Release: 2004 – 2006

Renovation Rescue is an Australian home renovation television series which screened on the Nine Network in 2004. It was loosely based on the American television series Extreme Makeover: Home Edition, with some differences such as time and the extent of renovation.

Renovation Rescue featured a group of tradespeople renovating a house in just two days. It was hosted by Rebecca Harris, Scott Cam and Peter Everett.

== See also ==
- Backyard Blitz
