= Getaway (TV series) =

Australian travel TV series

- Getaway logo
- Genre: Travel
- Presented by: Current; Catriona Rowntree; David Reyne; Charli Robinson; Jason Dundas; Tim Blackwell; Livinia Nixon
- Composer: Neil Sutherland
- Country of origin: Australia
- Original language: English
- No. of seasons: 32 (as of 2023)

Production
- Executive producer: John Walsh
- Producers: Scott Sinclair; Tim Thatcher; Anita Lane; Josh Martin; Rochell Martin; Nia Pericles; Majella Wiemers; Jason Sintome
- Production locations: International & Domestic
- Camera setup: Steve Davis, Jamie Hamill, Chris Miller, Gilbert Farkas, Max Polley, Stuart Bruce
- Running time: 30 minutes (including commercials)

Original release
- Network: Nine Network
- Release: 14 May 1992 – present

Getaway is Australia's longest-running travel and lifestyle television program. Debuting on 14 May 1992 in a Thursday 7:30 pm time slot, it is broadcast on the Nine Network and TLC. Its main competitor was The Great Outdoors on the Seven Network until 2009.

The first season looked at only tourism locally, including resorts and locations, but on 18 March 1993, it had expanded to look at international travel and tourism destinations.

In 2011, the program was reduced to a 30-minute format and moved to Saturday afternoons at 5:30 pm.

== Presenters ==
=== Current presenters ===
- Catriona Rowntree (1996–present)
- David Reyne (1992–2005, 2013–present)
- Charli Robinson (2003–present)
- Jason Dundas (2006–present)
- Tim Blackwell (2015–present)
- Livinia Nixon (2012–present)

=== Guest presenters ===
- Amber Lawrence
- Lauren Phillips
- Samantha McClymont
- Anna Gare
- Ian 'Dicko' Dickson
- Jesinta Franklin
- Ray Martin
- David Genat
- Renee Bargh and Sussan Mourad
- Nicky Buckley
- Caroline Pemberton
- David Adams
- Rebecca Johns
- Darren Capewell
- Kathy Lette and Jane Turner
- David Whitehill
- Lincoln Lewis
- Charlie Clausen
- Evelyn Ellis and Duncan James
- Poh Ling Yeow
- Lizzy Hoo

=== Former presenters ===
- Kelly Landry (2008–2011)
- Natalie Gruzlewski (2004–2014)
- Sophie Monk (2010–2011)
- Kate Ceberano (2011–2021)
- Jennifer Hawkins (2011–2019)
- Dermott Brereton (2007–2011)
- Giaan Rooney (2008–2012)
- Jules Lund (2004–2012)
- Henry Azaris (2003–2007)
- Ben Dark (1999–2010)
- Erik Thomson (2006–2007)
- Jodhi Meares (2006)
- Megan Gale (2005–2006)
- Brendon Julian (2004–2005)
- Sorrel Wilby (1996–2005)
- Lochie Daddo (1994–1999)
- Jeff Watson (1992–1998)
- Rebecca Harris (1992–1997)
- Chrissy Morrisey (1995)
- Jane Rutter (1994)
- Tina Dalton (1992–1993) (Note: Dalton returned to Getaway in 2023 for a guest appearance.)
- Anna McMahon (1992–1993)

== Awards ==
Getaway won an Australian Tourism Award for Excellence in the Media in 1995.

Getaway has also been nominated for the Most Popular Lifestyle Program Logie Award at the Logie Awards of 2003, 2004 and 2005, each time being beaten by Backyard Blitz. It was also nominated at the Logie Awards of 1999 and nominated as the Favourite Lifestyle Program at the Australian People Choice Awards of 1999.

== "Seven Wonders of the World" ==
In an episode broadcast in May 2006, Getaway viewers were asked to choose a new Seven Wonders of the World based on several destinations which had been pre-selected by the show's producers.

The destinations were (winners are shown in bold):

Natural wonders:

- Milford Sound
- Mount Everest
- **Grand Canyon**

Ancient: one wonder

- Machu Picchu
- **Pyramids of Giza**
- Petra

Ancient: two wonders

- Angkor Wat
- **Great Wall of China**
- Easter Island

Waterfall wonders

- **Niagara Falls**
- Victoria Falls
- Iguazu Falls

Modern wonders

- **Eiffel Tower**
- Taj Mahal
- Sydney Opera House

City wonders

- **Rome**
- New York City
- Shanghai

Island wonders

- Bora Bora
- Aitutaki
- **Santorini**

== New Zealand version ==
A New Zealand version of the program, with some local content, titled United Travel Getaway and later Getaway, was broadcast on TV One from 1997 until 2004 and Prime TV from 2004 until 2008.

=== Former presenters of the New Zealand version ===
- Margaret Urlich (1997–1998)
- Suzy Clarkson (1998–2001)
- Charlotte Dawson (2004–2007)
- Clarke Gayford (2007–2008)
- Lance Hipkins (2007)
- Renee Wright (2007)

== See also ==
- List of longest-running Australian television series
- List of Australian television series
- List of Nine Network programs
