= The Great Outdoors (Australian TV series) =

- Reboot logo
- Genre: Travel magazine
- Country of origin: Australia
- Original language: English
- No. of seasons: 19
- No. of episodes: 640

Production
- Camera setup: Video (1993–2003); HD video (filmized) (2003–2009; 2012)
- Running time: 30 minutes (including commercials)

Original release
- Network: Seven Network
- Release: 5 February 1993 – 15 August 2009
- Release: 6 October – 24 November 2012
- Release: 5 October 2024 – present

The Great Outdoors is an Australian travel magazine series broadcast on the Seven Network. It began in 1993 and was broadcast regularly until 2009, with a short-lived revival in 2012. It was again revived in 2024.

== History ==
Similar to its long time competitor Getaway on the Nine Network, the program features a team of reporters who travel around Australia and overseas, reporting on travel destinations, tourist attractions and accommodation.

The program premiered on 5 February 1993 in a 30-minute format and was broadcast on Tuesday evenings at 8:00 pm. In 2002, the show was expanded to 60 minutes and moved to the Monday 7:30 pm timeslot, where it had stayed until 2006.

After suffering a gradual decline in ratings, the show moved to a new timeslot of 6:30 pm Saturdays from the 2007 season. On 28 April 2007, the show celebrated 600 episodes, making it one of the longest-running programs on Australian television. However, after further decline in ratings, The Great Outdoors was cancelled in August 2009. The show did briefly return on 23 September 2012 for a revamped series with 8 episodes airing on a Saturday evening at 5pm, with the possibility of a new season in 2013 which did not eventuate.

The show returned on the Seven Network in the Saturday 7:00 pm timeslot from 5 October 2024.

== Presenters ==
=== Current ===
- James Tobin (2024–)
- Phil Burton (2024–)
- Teigan Nash (2024–)
- Kimberley Busteed (2024–)
- Lee Carseldine (2024–)
- Chris Parsons (2024–)

=== Former ===
- Bridget Adams (1994–2001)
- Ann-Maree Biggar (1994–1995)
- Adam Brand (2012)
- Penny Cook (1993–1996)
- Shelley Craft (2001–2007)
- Neil Crompton
- Laura Csortan (2000–2006)
- Andrew Daddo (1994), (2002–2008)
- Ernie Dingo (1993–2009)
- Andrew Dwyer (1994)
- Sophie Falkiner (1999–2005)
- Rachael Finch (2012)
- Sofie Formica (1993–1994)
- Jennifer Hawkins (2005–2009)
- Tony Johnston (1996, 1999–2001)
- Terasa Livingstone (1998–2001)
- Di Smith (1996–2006)
- Pete Wells (2012)
- Tom Williams (2001–2009, 2012)

== See also ==
- List of Australian television series
- List of programs broadcast by Seven Network
- List of longest-running Australian television series
