= Howard Elliott =

Howard Elliott may refer to:

- Howard Elliott (railroad executive) (1860–1928), president of Northern Pacific Railway, and president of New York, New Haven and Hartford Railroad
- Howard Elliott (Missouri politician) (1904–1985), lawyer and Republican politician from Missouri
- Howard Leslie Elliott (1877–1956), New Zealand Baptist minister, sectarian agitator and editor
- Howard R. Elliott, U.S. railroad executive and Administrator of the Pipeline and Hazardous Materials Safety Administration
