= Logie Award for Most Popular Lifestyle Program =

- Country: Australia
- Presented by: TV Week
- First award: 1990
- Currently held by: Travel Guides (2025)

Highlights
- Most awards: Better Homes and Gardens (12)
- Website: www.tvweeklogieawards.com.au

The Logie for Most Popular Lifestyle Program is a Silver Logie award presented annually at the annual Australian Logie Awards. The award recognises the popularity of an Australian lifestyle program or series giving expert advice on lifestyle matters.

It was first awarded at the 32nd Annual TV Week Logie Awards ceremony, held in 1990 and originally called Most Popular Lifestyle Program. It was briefly renamed Best Lifestyle Program. From 2018, the award category name was reverted to Most Popular Lifestyle Program.

The winner and nominees of Most Popular Lifestyle Program are chosen by the public through an online voting survey on the TV Week website. Better Homes and Gardens holds the record for the most wins, with twelve, followed by Burke's Backyard and Backyard Blitz with six wins each.

== Winners and nominees ==
Key	Meaning
‡	Indicates the winning program

Year	Program	Network	Ref
1990	Burke's Backyard‡	Nine Network	
1991	Burke's Backyard‡	Nine Network	
1992	Burke's Backyard‡	Nine Network	
1993	Burke's Backyard‡	Nine Network	
1994	Burke's Backyard‡	Nine Network	
1995	Burke's Backyard‡	Nine Network	
1996	Better Homes and Gardens‡	Seven Network	
1997	Better Homes and Gardens‡	Seven Network	
1998	Better Homes and Gardens‡	Seven Network	
1999	Better Homes and Gardens‡	Seven Network	
1999	Animal Hospital	Nine Network	
1999	Burke's Backyard	Nine Network	
1999	Getaway	Nine Network	
2000	Better Homes and Gardens‡	Seven Network	
2000	Burke's Backyard	Nine Network	
2000	Changing Rooms	Nine Network	
2000	Harry's Practice	Seven Network	
2001	Backyard Blitz‡	Nine Network	
2001	Better Homes and Gardens	Seven Network	
2001	Changing Rooms	Nine Network	
2001	Harry's Practice	Seven Network	
2002	Backyard Blitz‡	Nine Network	
2002	Changing Rooms	Nine Network	
2002	Ground Force	Seven Network	
2002	Harry's Practice	Seven Network	
2002	Surprise Chef	Seven Network	
2003	Backyard Blitz‡	Nine Network	
2003	Better Homes and Gardens	Seven Network	
2003	Getaway	Nine Network	
2003	The Great Outdoors	Seven Network	
2003	Harry's Practice	Seven Network	
2004	Backyard Blitz‡	Nine Network	
2004	DIY Rescue	Nine Network	
2004	Getaway	Nine Network	
2004	The Great Outdoors	Seven Network	
2004	Harry's Practice	Seven Network	
2005	Backyard Blitz‡	Nine Network	
2005	Burke's Backyard	Nine Network	
2005	Getaway	Nine Network	
2005	The Great Outdoors	Seven Network	
2005	Renovation Rescue	Nine Network	
2006	Backyard Blitz‡	Nine Network	
2006	Better Homes and Gardens	Seven Network	
2006	Getaway	Nine Network	
2006	The Great Outdoors	Seven Network	
2006	Renovation Rescue	Nine Network	
2007	What's Good For You‡	Nine Network	
2007	Backyard Blitz	Nine Network	
2007	Better Homes and Gardens	Seven Network	
2007	Getaway	Nine Network	
2007	The Great Outdoors	Seven Network	
2008	Better Homes and Gardens‡	Seven Network	
2008	Getaway	Nine Network	
2008	The Great Outdoors	Seven Network	
2008	Things To Try Before You Die	Nine Network	
2008	What's Good For You	Nine Network	
2009	Better Homes and Gardens‡	Seven Network	
2009	Domestic Blitz	Nine Network	
2009	Getaway	Nine Network	
2009	Ready Steady Cook	Network Ten	
2009	Top Gear Australia	SBS	
2010	Better Homes and Gardens‡	Seven Network	
2010	Domestic Blitz	Nine Network	
2010	Getaway	Nine Network	
2010	Ready Steady Cook	Network Ten	
2010	Top Gear Australia	SBS	
2011	Better Homes and Gardens‡	Seven Network	
2011	Domestic Blitz	Nine Network	
2011	Getaway	Nine Network	
2011	Grand Designs Australia	The LifeStyle Channel	
2011	Ready Steady Cook	Network Ten	
2012	Better Homes and Gardens‡	Seven Network	
2012	Getaway	Nine Network	
2012	IFISH	Network Ten	
2012	Ready Steady Cook	Network Ten	
2012	Selling Houses Australia Extreme	The LifeStyle Channel	
2013	Better Homes and Gardens‡	Seven Network	
2013	Getaway	Nine Network	
2013	Grand Designs Australia	The LifeStyle Channel	
2013	The Living Room	Network Ten	
2013	Selling Houses Australia	The LifeStyle Channel	
2014	Better Homes and Gardens‡	Seven Network	
2014	Domestic Blitz: The Block to the Rescue	Nine Network	
2014	Embarrassing Bodies Down Under	LifeStyle You	
2014	The Living Room	Network Ten	
2014	Selling Houses Australia	The LifeStyle Channel	
2015	The Living Room‡	Network Ten	
2015	Better Homes and Gardens	Seven Network	
2015	Getaway	Nine Network	
2015	Grand Designs Australia	The LifeStyle Channel	
2015	Selling Houses Australia	The LifeStyle Channel	
2016	The Living Room‡	Network Ten	
2016	Better Homes and Gardens	Seven Network	
2016	Gardening Australia	ABC	
2016	Getaway	Nine Network	
2016	Selling Houses Australia	The LifeStyle Channel	
2017	The Living Room‡	Network Ten	
2017	Better Homes and Gardens	Seven Network	
2017	Gardening Australia	ABC	
2017	Luke Warm Sex	ABC	
2017	Selling Houses Australia	The LifeStyle Channel	
2018	The Living Room‡	Network Ten	
2018	Better Homes and Gardens	Seven Network	
2018	Gardening Australia	ABC	
2018	Selling Houses Australia	The LifeStyle Channel	
2018	The Checkout	ABC	
2019	Gardening Australia‡	ABC	
2019	Back In Time For Dinner	ABC	
2019	Better Homes and Gardens	Seven Network	
2019	Selling Houses Australia	The LifeStyle Channel	
2019	The Living Room	Network Ten	
2019	Travel Guides	Nine Network	
2022	Travel Guides‡	Nine Network	
2022	Better Homes and Gardens	Seven Network	
2022	Bondi Rescue	Network Ten	
2022	Gardening Australia	ABC	
2022	Love It Or List It Australia	Foxtel	
2022	The Living Room	Network Ten	
2023	Travel Guides‡	Nine Network	
2023	A Dog’s World With Tony Armstrong	ABC	
2023	Back Roads	ABC	
2023	Better Homes and Gardens	Seven Network	
2023	Gardening Australia	ABC	
2023	Selling Houses Australia	Foxtel	
2024	Travel Guides‡	Nine Network	
2024	Better Homes and Gardens	Seven Network	
2024	Gardening Australia	ABC	
2024	Love it or List it Australia	Foxtel	
2024	Restoration Australia	ABC	
2024	Selling Houses Australia	Foxtel	
2025	Travel Guides‡	Nine Network	
2025	Better Homes and Gardens	Seven Network	
2025	Do You Want to Live Forever?	Nine Network	
2025	Gardening Australia	ABC	
2025	Grand Designs Australia	Foxtel	
2025	Restoration Australia	ABC	

== Multiple wins ==
Number	Program
Wins
12	Better Homes and Gardens
6	Burke's Backyard
6	Backyard Blitz
4	The Living Room
4	Travel Guides
