= Travel Guides (TV series) =

Australian television series

- Genre: Travel
- Narrated by: Denise Scott
- Country of origin: Australia
- Original language: English
- No. of series: 9
- No. of episodes: 81

Production
- Running time: 60 mins (including ads)

Original release
- Network: Nine Network
- Release: 14 February 2017 – present

Travel Guides is an Australian travel series which premiered on the Nine Network on 14 February 2017. The series follows groups of ordinary Australians who take on the job of travel critics who experience the same week-long international and domestic holidays, and review the same accommodation, cuisine, and local sights.

The series is based on a similar programme of the same name made by UK production company Studio Lambert in 2015.

In May 2017, the series was renewed for a second season. In October 2017, the series second season was officially confirmed at Nine's upfronts with three travel guide groups from the first season set to return. The second season premiered on 29 January 2018.

In March 2018, a casting call went out for new groups to become part of the third season for 2019. The third season premiered on 5 February 2019.

In October 2019, the series was officially renewed for a fourth season at Nine's upfronts. The fourth season was set to air in early 2020, however due to the COVID-19 pandemic, the season was delayed and aired on 26 January 2021.

In September 2021, the series was officially renewed for a fifth season at Nine's upfronts. The fifth season premiered on 30 March 2022.

Travel Guides, won the Logie Award for Most Popular Lifestyle Program in 2022 and 2023.

The sixth season premiered on 19 April 2023. The final two episodes of season six began airing in November 2023. The seventh season premiered on 19 May 2024. The eighth season premiered on 21 April 2025 (Easter Monday)

In October 2025, the series was renewed for a ninth season to premiere in 2026, with returning and new travellers seen in past Nine tv shows.

== Travellers ==
Traveller/Group	Series Duration	Occupation(s)	Hometown
Mark, Cathy, Victoria & Jonathan (Fren Family)	Season 1–present	Restaurateurs (parents and children)	Newcastle, NSW
Kevin & Janetta	Season 1–present	Retired couple	Maldon, Vic
Kev, Dorian & Teng	Season 2–present	Three best friends	Melbourne, Vic
Matt & Brett	Season 4–present	Couple	Newcastle, NSW
Karly & Bri	Season 7–present	Best friends	Unknown
Lucinda and Andie	Season 9-	MAFS stars	TBA
Eliza and Liberty	Season 9-	The Block stars	TBA
Callum and Mitch	Season 9-	Love Island stars	TBA
Brooke and Adam	Season 9-	Country singers	TBA
Tash and Meryl	Season 9-	Best mates	TBA
Nicky and Connie	Season 9-	Mum friends	Brisbane
Stack & Mel; Stack & Josh	Season 1–5 (Note: For five seasons, Mel would travel the world with her twin sister, Stack, however since Mel had a baby, their brother Josh replaced her.); Season 6	Twin sisters Sister & brother	Baddaginnie, Vic; Gunnedah, NSW
Deepesh & Sage	Season 3	Married couple	Melbourne, Vic
Taash & Mads	Season 2	Friends	Melbourne, Vic
Chrissy, Mon & Cath	Season 1	Flight attendants	Unknown (Various)
Matt & Monni	Season 1	Backpackers	Sunshine Coast, Qld
Sam, Jo, Dean & Robbie (Rifai Family)	Season 1	Business owners (parents and children)	Sydney, NSW

== Episodes ==
=== Series overview ===
Series	Episodes	Originally released	
Series	Episodes	First released	Last released
1	7	14 February 2017	28 March 2017
2	8	29 January 2018	26 March 2018
3	9	5 February 2019	2 April 2019
4	12	26 January 2021	23 June 2021
5	8	30 March 2022	18 May 2022
6	10	19 April 2023	28 November 2023
7	10	19 May 2024	21 July 2024
8	10	21 April 2025	20 July 2025
9	TBA	21 April 2026	TBA

=== Season 1 (2017) ===
No. overall	No. in season	Title	Original release date	AUS viewers
1	1	"Tokyo"	14 February 2017	625,000
Destination Experience Rating (out of 5): Chrissy, Mon & Cath: Fren Family: Kevin & Janetta: Matt & Monni: Mel & Stack: Rifai Family:
2	2	"Phuket"	21 February 2017	642,000
Destination Experience Rating (out of 5): Chrissy, Mon & Cath: Fren Family: Kevin & Janetta: Matt & Monni: Mel & Stack: Rifai Family:
3	3	"Queenstown, New Zealand"	28 February 2017	621,000
Destination Experience Rating (out of 5): Chrissy, Mon & Cath: Fren Family: Kevin & Janetta: Matt & Monni: Mel & Stack: Rifai Family:
4	4	"Oman"	7 March 2017	665,000
Destination Experience Rating (out of 5): Chrissy, Mon & Cath: Fren Family: Kevin & Janetta: Matt & Monni: Mel & Stack: Rifai Family:
5	5	"Top End"	14 March 2017	706,000
Destination Experience Rating (out of 5): Chrissy, Mon & Cath: Fren Family: Kevin & Janetta: Matt & Monni: Mel & Stack: Rifai Family:
6	6	"South Pacific Cruise"	21 March 2017	762,000
Destination Experience Rating (out of 5): Chrissy, Mon & Cath: Fren Family: Kevin & Janetta: Matt & Monni: Mel & Stack: Rifai Family:
7	7	"Gold Coast"	28 March 2017	760,000
Destination Experience Rating (out of 5): Chrissy, Mon & Cath: Fren Family: Kevin & Janetta: Matt & Monni: Mel & Stack: Rifai Family:

=== Season 2 (2018) ===
No. overall	No. in season	Title	Original release date	AUS viewers
8	1	"Bologna"	29 January 2018	709,000
Destination Experience Rating (out of 5): Fren Family: Kevin & Janetta: Mel & Stack: Kev, Dorian & Teng: Taash & Mads:
9	2	"Bali"	5 February 2018	703,000
Destination Experience Rating (out of 5): Fren Family: Kevin & Janetta: Mel & Stack: Kev, Dorian & Teng: Taash & Mads:
10	3	"Wanaka"	19 February 2018	705,000
Destination Experience Rating (out of 5): Fren Family: Kevin & Janetta: Mel & Stack: Kev, Dorian & Teng: Taash & Mads:
11	4	"South Africa"	26 February 2018	771,000
Destination Experience Rating (out of 5): Fren Family: Kevin & Janetta: Mel & Stack: Kev, Dorian & Teng: Taash & Mads:
12	5	"Vietnam"	5 March 2018	788,000
Destination Experience Rating (out of 5): Fren Family: Kevin & Janetta: Mel & Stack: Kev, Dorian & Teng: Taash & Mads:
13	6	"Tropical North Queensland"	12 March 2018	754,000
Destination Experience Rating (out of 5): Fren Family: Kevin & Janetta: Mel & Stack: Kev, Dorian & Teng: Taash & Mads:
14	7	"Sri Lanka"	19 March 2018	918,000
Destination Experience Rating (out of 5): Fren Family: Kevin & Janetta: Mel & Stack: Kev, Dorian & Teng: Taash & Mads:
15	8	"Western Australia"	26 March 2018	762,000
Destination Experience Rating (out of 5): Fren Family: Kevin & Janetta: Mel & Stack: Kev, Dorian & Teng: Taash & Mads:

=== Season 3 (2019) ===
No. overall	No. in season	Title	Original release date	AUS viewers
16	1	"Hawaii"	5 February 2019	828,000
Destination Experience Rating (out of 5): Fren Family: Kevin & Janetta: Mel & Stack: Kev, Dorian & Teng: Deepesh & Sage:
17	2	"European Cruise"	12 February 2019	777,000
Destination Experience Rating (out of 5): Fren Family: Kevin & Janetta: Mel & Stack: Kev, Dorian & Teng: Deepesh & Sage:
18	3	"Taiwan"	19 February 2019	842,000
Destination Experience Rating (out of 5): Fren Family: Kevin & Janetta: Mel & Stack: Kev, Dorian & Teng: Deepesh & Sage:
19	4	"Argentina"	26 February 2019	847,000
Destination Experience Rating (out of 5): Fren Family: Kevin & Janetta: Mel & Stack: Kev, Dorian & Teng: Deepesh & Sage:
20	5	"India"	5 March 2019	858,000
Destination Experience Rating (out of 5): Fren Family: Kevin & Janetta: Mel & Stack: Kev, Dorian & Teng: Deepesh & Sage:
21	6	"South Australia Foodie Tour"	12 March 2019	894,000
Destination Experience Rating (out of 5): Fren Family: Kevin & Janetta: Mel & Stack: Kev, Dorian & Teng: Deepesh & Sage:
22	7	"The Philippines"	19 March 2019	884,000
Destination Experience Rating (out of 5): Fren Family: Kevin & Janetta: Mel & Stack: Kev, Dorian & Teng: Deepesh & Sage:
23	8	"Israel"	26 March 2019	1,022,000
Destination Experience Rating (out of 5): Fren Family: Kevin & Janetta: Mel & Stack: Kev, Dorian & Teng: Deepesh & Sage:
24	9	"Canberra"	2 April 2019	970,000
Destination Experience Rating (out of 5): Fren Family: Kevin & Janetta: Mel & Stack: Kev, Dorian & Teng: Deepesh & Sage:

=== Season 4 (2021) ===
No. overall	No. in season	Title	Original release date	AUS viewers
25	1	"Byron Bay"	26 January 2021	666,000
Destination Experience Rating (out of 5): Fren Family: Kevin & Janetta: Mel & Stack: Kev, Dorian & Teng: Matt & Brett:
26	2	"Red Centre"	27 January 2021	742,000
Destination Experience Rating (out of 5): Fren Family: Kevin & Janetta: Mel & Stack: Kev, Dorian & Teng: Matt & Brett:
27	3	"Whitsundays"	2 February 2021	728,000
Destination Experience Rating (out of 5): Fren Family: Kevin & Janetta: Mel & Stack: Kev, Dorian & Teng: Matt & Brett:
28	4	"Tasmania"	3 February 2021	700,000
Destination Experience Rating (out of 5): Fren Family: Kevin & Janetta: Mel & Stack: Kev, Dorian & Teng: Matt & Brett:
29	5	"Greece"	28 April 2021	774,000
Destination Experience Rating (out of 5): Fren Family: Kevin & Janetta: Mel & Stack: Kev, Dorian & Teng: Matt & Brett:
30	6	"Mauritius"	3 May 2021	748,000
Destination Experience Rating (out of 5): Fren Family: Kevin & Janetta: Mel & Stack: Kev, Dorian & Teng: Matt & Brett:
31	7	"Vietnam"/"Cambodia"	12 May 2021	745,000
Destination Experience Rating (out of 5): Fren Family: Kevin & Janetta: Mel & Stack: Kev, Dorian & Teng: Matt & Brett:
32	8	"South Australia"	19 May 2021	717,000
Destination Experience Rating (out of 5): Fren Family: Kevin & Janetta: Mel & Stack: Kev, Dorian & Teng: Matt & Brett:
33	9	"Turkey"	26 May 2021	763,000
Destination Experience Rating (out of 5): Fren Family: Kevin & Janetta: Mel & Stack: Kev, Dorian & Teng: Matt & Brett:
34	10	"Mexico"	2 June 2021	770,000
Destination Experience Rating (out of 5): Fren Family: Kevin & Janetta: Kev, Dorian & Teng: Matt & Brett:
35	11	"Kimberley"	16 June 2021	741,000
Destination Experience Rating (out of 5): Fren Family: Kevin & Janetta: Mel & Stack: Kev, Dorian & Teng: Matt & Brett:
36	12	"South Korea"	23 June 2021	820,000
Destination Experience Rating (out of 5): Fren Family: Kevin & Janetta: Mel & Stack: Kev, Dorian & Teng: Matt & Brett:

=== Season 5 (2022) ===
No. overall	No. in season	Title	Original release date	AUS viewers
37	1	"Texas"	30 March 2022	626,000 (Note: This episode did not air until 5 April 2022 in Victoria, due to coverage of the Memorial Service of Shane Warne. The viewership number is the combination of both airings.)
Destination Experience Rating (out of 5): Fren Family: Kevin & Janetta: Mel & Stack: Kev, Dorian & Teng: Matt & Brett:
38	2	"Louisiana"	6 April 2022	727,000
Destination Experience Rating (out of 5): Fren Family: Kevin & Janetta: Mel & Stack: Kev, Dorian & Teng: Matt & Brett:
39	3	"Sunshine Coast"	13 April 2022	665,000
Destination Experience Rating (out of 5): Fren Family: Kevin & Janetta: Mel & Stack: Kev, Dorian & Teng: Matt & Brett:
40	4	"Perth"	27 April 2022	613,000
Destination Experience Rating (out of 5): Fren Family: Kevin & Janetta: Mel & Stack: Kev, Dorian & Teng: Matt & Brett:
41	5	"Flinders Ranges"	5 May 2022	578,000
Destination Experience Rating (out of 5): Fren Family: Kevin & Janetta: Mel & Stack: Kev, Dorian & Teng: Matt & Brett:
42	6	"Brisbane"	11 May 2022	618,000
Destination Experience Rating (out of 5): Fren Family: Kevin & Janetta: Mel & Stack: Kev, Dorian & Teng: Matt & Brett:
43	7	"Sydney"	17 May 2022	554,000
Destination Experience Rating (out of 5): Fren Family: Kevin & Janetta: Mel & Stack: Kev, Dorian & Teng: Matt & Brett:
44	8	"Great Ocean Road"	18 May 2022	593,000
Destination Experience Rating (out of 5): Fren Family: Kevin & Janetta: Mel & Stack: Kev, Dorian & Teng: Matt & Brett:

=== Season 6 (2023) ===
No. overall	No. in season	Title	Original release date	AUS viewers
45	1	"Morocco"	19 April 2023	582,000
Destination Experience Rating (out of 5): Fren Family: Kevin & Janetta: Stack & Josh: Kev, Dorian & Teng: Matt & Brett:
46	2	"Croatia"	26 April 2023	563,000
Destination Experience Rating (out of 5): Fren Family: Kevin & Janetta: Stack & Josh: Kev, Dorian & Teng: Matt & Brett:
47	3	"Malaysia"	3 May 2023	671,000
Destination Experience Rating (out of 5): Fren Family: Kevin & Janetta: Stack & Josh: Kev, Dorian & Teng: Matt & Brett:
48	4	"Vanuatu"	10 May 2023	534,000
Destination Experience Rating (out of 5): Fren Family: Kevin & Janetta: Stack & Josh: Kev, Dorian & Teng: Matt & Brett:
49	5	"Riverina"	17 May 2023	622,000
Destination Experience Rating (out of 5): Fren Family: Kevin & Janetta: Stack & Josh: Kev, Dorian & Teng: Matt & Brett:
50	6	"New Zealand"	24 May 2023	560,000
Destination Experience Rating (out of 5): Fren Family: Kevin & Janetta: Stack & Josh: Kev, Dorian & Teng: Matt & Brett:
51	7	"Finland"	7 June 2023	686,000
Destination Experience Rating (out of 5): Fren Family: Kevin & Janetta: Stack & Josh: Kev, Dorian & Teng: Matt & Brett:
52	8	"Melbourne"	14 June 2023	632,000
Destination Experience Rating (out of 5): Fren Family: Kevin & Janetta: Stack & Josh: Kev, Dorian & Teng: Matt & Brett:
53	9	"South Africa"	21 November 2023	640,000
Destination Experience Rating (out of 5): Fren Family: Kevin & Janetta: Stack & Josh: Kev, Dorian & Teng: Matt & Brett:
54	10	"Great Britain"	28 November 2023	645,000
Destination Experience Rating (out of 5): Fren Family: Kevin & Janetta: Stack & Josh: Kev, Dorian & Teng: Matt & Brett:

=== Season 7 (2024) ===
No. overall	No. in season	Title	Original release date	AUS viewers (Total)
55	1	"India & Nepal"	19 May 2024	986,000
Destination Experience Rating (out of 5): Fren Family: Kevin & Janetta: Karly & Bri: Kev, Dorian & Teng: Matt & Brett:
56	2	"Los Angeles & Vegas"	26 May 2024	1,100,000
Destination Experience Rating (out of 5): Fren Family: Kevin & Janetta: Karly & Bri: Kev, Dorian & Teng: Matt & Brett:
57	3	"Florida"	2 June 2024	1,175,000
Destination Experience Rating (out of 5): Fren Family: Kevin & Janetta: Karly & Bri: Kev, Dorian & Teng: Matt & Brett:
58	4	"Hong Kong"	16 June 2024	1,150,000
Destination Experience Rating (out of 5): Fren Family: Kevin & Janetta: Karly & Bri: Kev, Dorian & Teng: Matt & Brett:
59	5	"Canada"	23 June 2024	1,177,000
Destination Experience Rating (out of 5): Fren Family: Kevin & Janetta: Karly & Bri: Kev, Dorian & Teng: Matt & Brett:
60	6	"Cook Islands"	30 June 2024	530,000
Destination Experience Rating (out of 5): Fren Family: Kevin & Janetta: Karly & Bri: Kev, Dorian & Teng: Matt & Brett:
61	7	"Peru"	7 July 2024	1,191,000
Destination Experience Rating (out of 5): Fren Family: Kevin & Janetta: Karly & Bri: Kev, Dorian & Teng: Matt & Brett:
62	8	"Newcastle"	14 July 2024	1,257,000
Destination Experience Rating (out of 5): Fren Family: Kevin & Janetta: Karly & Bri: Kev, Dorian & Teng: Matt & Brett:
63	9	"Northern Tasmania"	15 July 2024	1,061,000
Destination Experience Rating (out of 5): Fren Family: Kevin & Janetta: Karly & Bri: Kev, Dorian & Teng: Matt & Brett:
64	10	"France"	21 July 2024	1,140,000
Destination Experience Rating (out of 5): Fren Family: Kevin & Janetta: Karly & Bri: Kev, Dorian & Teng: Matt & Brett:

=== Season 8 (2025) ===
No. overall	No. in season	Title	Original release date	AUS Viewers (Total)
65	1	"New York City"	21 April 2025	892,000
Destination Experience Rating (out of 5): Fren Family: Kevin & Janetta: Karly & Bri: Kev, Dorian & Teng: (Dorian stayed back in Australia for a wedding); Matt & Brett:
66	2	"Switzerland"	27 April 2025	1,178,000
Destination Experience Rating (out of 5): Fren Family: Kevin & Janetta: Karly & Bri: Kev, Dorian & Teng: Matt & Brett:
67	3	"Northern Territory"	4 May 2025	984,000
Destination Experience Rating (out of 5): Fren Family: Kevin & Janetta: Karly & Bri: Kev, Dorian & Teng: Matt & Brett:
68	4	“Tahiti”	11 May 2025	1,003,000
Destination Experience Rating (out of 5): Fren Family: Kevin & Janetta: Karly & Bri: Kev, Dorian & Teng: Matt & Brett:
69	5	“Spain & Portugal”	18 May 2025	1,048,000
Destination Experience Rating (out of 5): Fren Family: Kevin & Janetta: Karly & Bri: Kev, Dorian & Teng: Matt & Brett:
70	6	“New Zealand Cruise”	25 May 2025	1,299,000
Destination Experience Rating (out of 5): Fren Family: Kevin & Janetta: Karly & Bri: Kev, Dorian & Teng: Matt & Brett:
71	7	“Thailand”	29 June 2025	1,071,000
Destination Experience Rating (out of 5): Fren Family: Kevin & Janetta: Karly & Bri: Kev, Dorian & Teng: Matt & Brett:
72	8	“San Francisco & Yosemite National Park”	6 July 2025	1,152,000
Destination Experience Rating (out of 5): Fren Family: Kevin & Janetta: Karly & Bri: Kev, Dorian & Teng: Matt & Brett:
73	9	“Japan”	13 July 2025	1,158,000
Destination Experience Rating (out of 5): Fren Family: Kevin & Janetta: Karly & Bri: Kev, Dorian & Teng: Matt & Brett:
74	10	“Country New South Wales”	20 July 2025	1,253,000
Destination Experience Rating (out of 5): Fren Family: Kevin & Janetta: Karly & Bri: Kev, Dorian & Teng: Matt & Brett:

=== Season 9 (2026) ===
No. overall	No. in season	Title	Original release date	AUS Viewers (Total)
75	1	"Ireland"	21 April 2026	1,025,000
Destination Experience Rating (out of 5): Fren Family: Kevin & Janetta: Karly & Bri: Kev, Dorian & Teng: N/A; Matt & Brett: Lucinda & Andie:
76	2	"Chile"	22 June 2026	830,000
Destination Experience Rating (out of 5): Fren Family: Kevin & Janetta: Karly & Bri: N/A; Kev, Dorian & Teng: Matt & Brett: Eliza & Liberty:
77	3	"Tanzania"	29 June 2026	839,000
Destination Experience Rating (out of 5): Fren Family: Kevin & Janetta: N/A; Karly & Bri: Kev, Dorian & Teng: Matt & Brett: Brooke & Adam:
78	4	"Indonesia: Beyond Bali"	6 July 2026	891,000
Destination Experience Rating (out of 5): Fren Family: N/A; Kevin & Janetta: Karly & Bri: Kev, Dorian & Teng: Matt & Brett: Brooke & Adam:
79	5	"NSW South Coast"	13 July 2026	860,000
Destination Experience Rating (out of 5): Fren Family: Kevin & Janetta: N/A; Karly & Bri: Kev, Dorian & Teng: Matt & Brett: Callum & Mitch:
80	6	"Rio de Janeiro"	20 July 2026	898,000
Destination Experience Rating (out of 5): Fren Family: Kevin & Janetta: Karly & Bri: N/A; Kev, Dorian & Teng: Matt & Brett: Eliza & Liberty:
81	7	"Outback Queensland"	27 July 2026	867,000
Destination Experience Rating (out of 5): Fren Family: Kevin & Janetta: Karly & Bri: Kev, Dorian & Teng: Matt & Brett: N/A; Tash & Meryl:
82	8	"Dubai"	26 October 2026	865,000
Destination Experience Rating (out of 5): Calum & Mitch: Kevin & Janetta: Karly & Bri: Kev, Dorian & Teng:

== Awards ==
Year	Award	Category	Nominee(s)	Result	Ref.
2018	TV Week Logies	Most Popular Reality Program	Travel Guides	Nominated	
2024	TV Week Logies	Best Lifestyle Program	Travel Guides	Won	
2025	TV Week Logies	Best Lifestyle Program	Travel Guides	Won	
2026	TV Week Logies	Best Lifestyle Program	Travel Guides	Won	

== International broadcast ==
In Israel, the show is broadcast on Arutz HaTiyulim via both yes and HOT subscription television services.

In New Zealand, the show is broadcast on TVNZ 2, and is available via the TVNZ OnDemand streaming platform. TVNZ also broadcast a local version of the show, Travel Guides NZ, which featured New Zealanders travelling domestically in 2021.

== See also ==
- List of Australian television series
- List of programs broadcast by Nine Network
