= Paul Worsteling =

Australian sports fisherman

- Born: Paul Anthony Worsteling; 29 October 1973 (age 52); Victoria, Australia
- Occupations: Professional fisherman, television and radio host, writer
- Website: paulworsteling.com.au

Paul Anthony Worsteling (born 29 October 1973) is an Australian sports fisherman, television and radio host and entrepreneur.

== Career ==
Worsteling's television career started with guest appearances on Escape with ET (Nine Network) and Rex Hunt's Fishing Adventure (Seven Network). This led to a four-year experience as Rex Hunt's co-host, until the show ended and Worsteling started the IFISH program on Network Ten. IFISH with Tackleworld receiving Logie nominations in 2012 and 2013. Worsteling has filmed throughout the states and territories of Australia and various locations such as New Zealand, Fiji, Netherlands, Vanuatu, Malaysia, Mexico and the USA.

== Entrepreneurship ==
Worsteling's expertise in retail began as a 15-year-old working in the fishing department of Kmart and then as a staff member of Cranbourne Bait and Tackle. In 1996, at the age of twenty-two, Worsteling received the opportunity to purchase the whole store.

== Bibliography ==
- The Fisherman's Bucket List (2011)
- Baits, rigs and lures for Victorian fishing (2011)
- Fishing guide to Western Port (Edition one 2004, Edition two 2007, Edition three 2010)
