= Surprise Chef =

- Genre: Cooking
- Presented by: Aristos Papandroulakis
- Narrated by: Kosta Zorbas
- Country of origin: Australia
- Original language: English
- No. of seasons: 4
- No. of episodes: 52

Production
- Camera setup: Video (2001–2003); HD video (filmized) (2003)
- Running time: 30 minutes

Original release
- Network: Seven Network
- Release: 2001 – 2003

Surprise Chef is an Australian cooking television show that was broadcast on the Seven Network from 2001 to 2003.

The show revolved around chef Aristos Papandroulakis, who would surprise an unwitting Coles supermarket shopper with an offer to cook dinner for them in their own home. If taken up on the offer, Papandroulakis then set himself to cook a filling meal using only the ingredients available to him from their pantry, fridge or what groceries they had bought. He also set himself a "challenge ingredient"; in one episode this involved using a bottle of Coca-Cola as a marinade.

In bookending segments, Papandroulakis was also joined by co-presenters Ian "Herbie" Hemphill and Flip Shelton, who gave tips on food preparation and meal ideas. Later, Greg Duncan Powell, Jon Fitzgerald and Ben Canaider joined the cast, giving advice on choosing wines, while Cindy Sargon replaced Shelton in season 3.

== See also ==
- Take Home Chef, a similar American series
