= Ifish =

ifish
- Genre: Fishing; Lifestyle
- Presented by: Paul Worsteling
- Country of origin: Australia
- Original language: English
- No. of seasons: 18
- No. of episodes: 620

Production
- Running time: 30 minutes

Original release
- Network: Network Ten
- Release: 2006 – present

iFish is a fishing show hosted by Paul Worsteling. It airs on Network 10, YouTube and digital multi-channel 10 Bold. The program is sponsored by BCF.

In 2010 the program's crew visited Vanuatu and some other places in Australia. In 2012, during the Logie Awards of 2012, the program received a TV Week Logie Awards nomination for Logie Award for Most Popular Lifestyle Program. This was the first time that an Australian fishing show received an Logie award nomination. The program made it to the final five nominations, but lost out to Better Homes and Gardens. In 2013, the program received another Logie award nomination, but iFish did not make it to the final five nominations in 2013. In 2013 and 2014, the program's crew visited Mandurah and Fraser Island and filmed its 10th season, in 2016 the program's crew visited Noosa, and in 2021 the program's crew, including the executive producer Tom Hughes visited the Gold Coast, during a marlin run in January of that year.

== Reception ==
In a negative review, Brad Newsome of The Age noted, "Why would you start a series with clips from last season? It's cheap, I suppose. This episode has host Paul Worsteling catching snapper in South Australia (with Merv Hughes), barramundi in Queensland and the poor old elephant fish in Victoria." In a positive review, Robin Oliver of The Sydney Morning Herald noted, "This fast-moving series is supposedly for fisherfolk at all levels but really it is more for those who can afford to visit the top spots, hire the best boats and meet knowledgeable skippers. Paul Worsteling visits Runaway Bay on the Gold Coast and searches for blue-eye trevalla. Then it's off early to Port Phillip Bay, where the gummy sharks seem anxious to be on telly."

== See also ==
- Fishing television series
