= Aristos Papandroulakis =

Australian chef (born 1965)

Aaron "Aristos" Papandroulakis (born 1965 in Bunbury, Western Australia) is an Australian chef best known for hosting the Seven Network cooking show Surprise Chef. He also hosted BYO Chef, also for Seven.

Papandroulakis has authored two cookbooks, "Cooking with Aristos" and "Cooking with the Surprise Chef", and owns a fish and chip restaurant in his hometown called Aristos', which he established in 1992. He established a seafood restaurant and takeaway on Rottnest Island in May 2009, which has since changed ownership. In 2018 Aristos and his company were found guilty of multiple counts of possessing fish taken for a recreational purpose at his restaurant, and fined $10000.

Papandroulakis also operates a seafood processing business as well as his restaurant business.
