= Maldon, Victoria =

Maldon
- Town
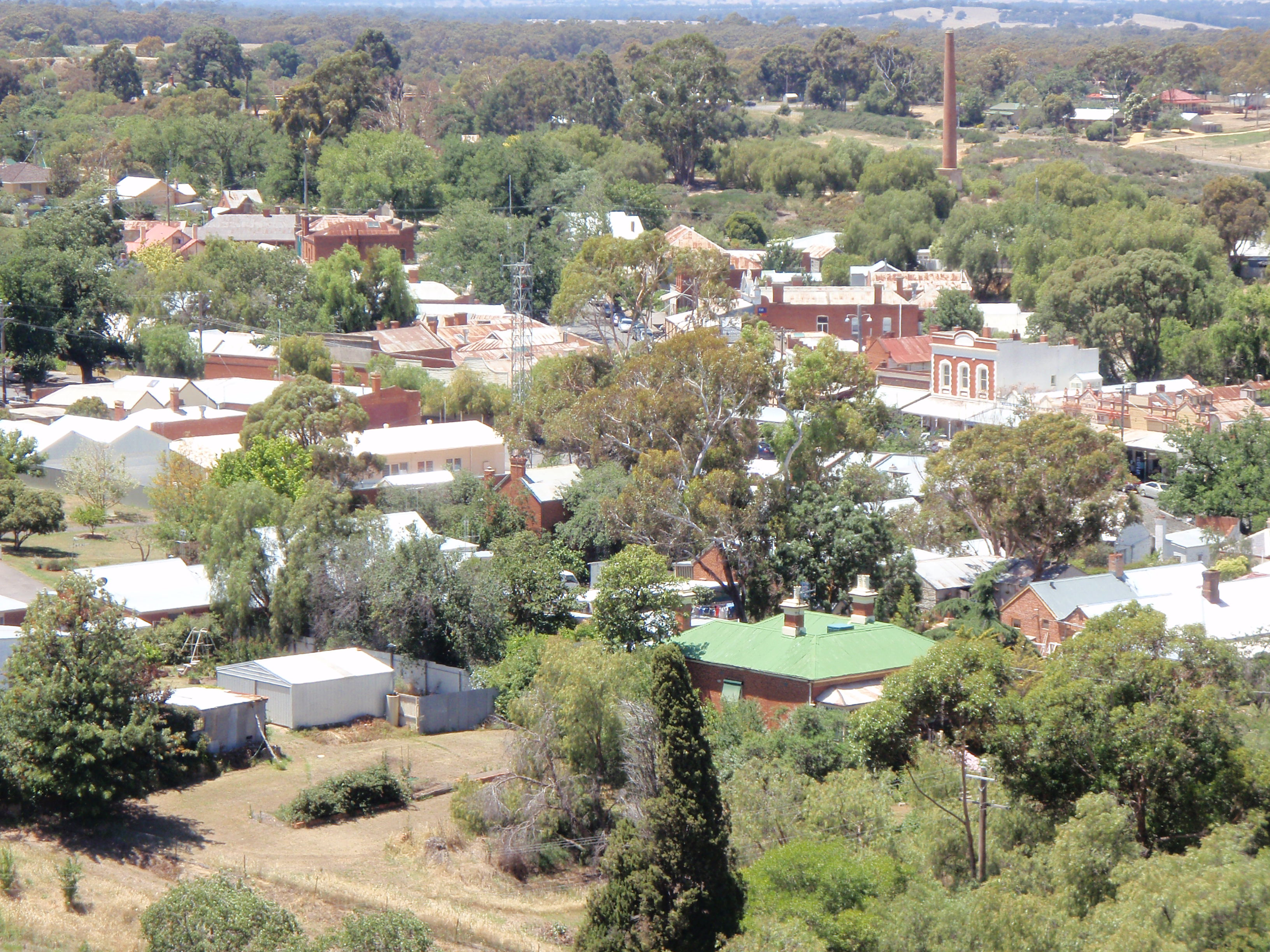
- View of Maldon from the south west, 2009

- Interactive map of Maldon
- Coordinates: 36°59′30″S 144°4′0″E
- Country: Australia
- State: Victoria
- LGA: Shire of Mount Alexander
- Location: 141 km (88 mi) from Melbourne; 39 km (24 mi) from Bendigo; 19 km (12 mi) from Castlemaine
- Established: 1853

Government
  - State electorate: Bendigo West, Northern Victoria
  - Federal division: Bendigo

Area
  - Total: 45.1 km^{2} (17.4 sq mi)
- Elevation: 358 m (1,175 ft)

Population
  - Total: 1,665 (2021 census)
  - Density: 36.92/km^{2} (95.62/sq mi)
- Postcode: 3463
- Mean max temp: 19.6 °C (67.3 °F)
- Mean min temp: 7.5 °C (45.5 °F)
- Annual rainfall: 598.9 mm (23.58 in)

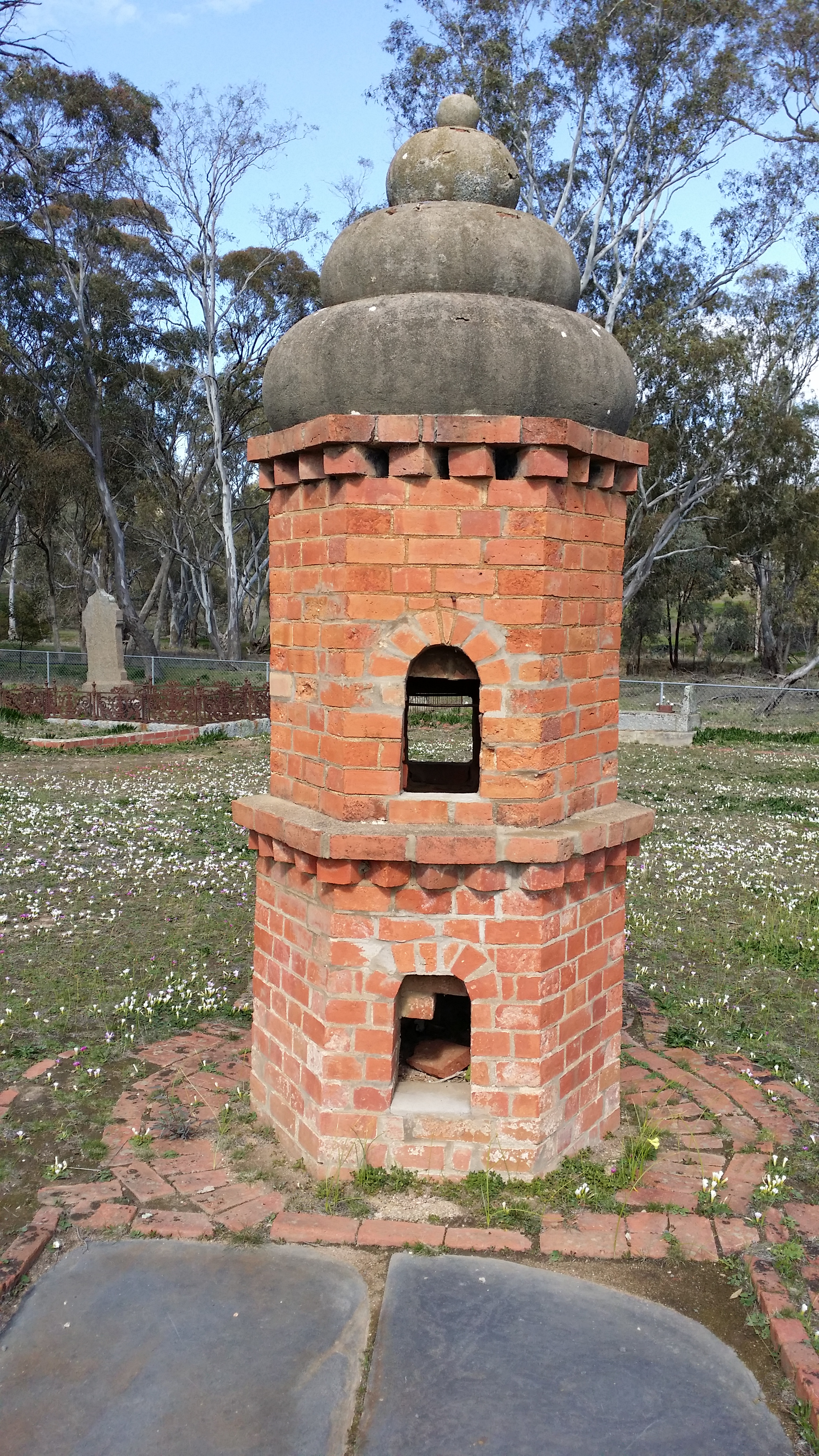
Chinese incense burner.

Maldon is a town in Victoria, Australia, in the Shire of Mount Alexander local government area. It has been designated "Australia's first notable town" and is notable for its 19th-century appearance, maintained since gold-rush days. At the 2021 census, Maldon had a population of 1,665.

== History ==
Prior to European colonisation the Maldon district was occupied by the indigenous Djadjawurrung people.

Major Thomas Mitchell's Victorian expedition of 1836 was the first European exploration of the Maldon district. It was colonised soon afterwards by pastoralists, and two sheep runs were established in the area, at the foot of nearby Mount Tarrengower. In December 1853, gold was discovered at Cairn Curran (one of the sheep runs), and Maldon became a part of the Victorian Gold Rush.

The goldfield which was named "Tarrangower Fields" after Mount Tarrangower (now usually referred to as Tarrengower), immediately attracted people eager to make their fortunes at the diggings. One month after gold was first discovered, the Chief Commissioner for Goldfields reported 3000 miners had arrived at the diggings. A month after that, a journalist for The Argus reported that the road from Castlemaine to Maldon was lined with the shops of people hoping to make a living of their own from the miners:

The road follows up the course of Long Gully, where the diggings were first opened, for a couple of miles, and is lined on either side by an almost continuous row of stores, refreshment tents, eating houses, doctors' tents, apothecaries' shops, and, in fact, shops of every description.

The same report noted that the goldfield's population had already grown to 18,000, though only about 1000 had taken out mining licences.

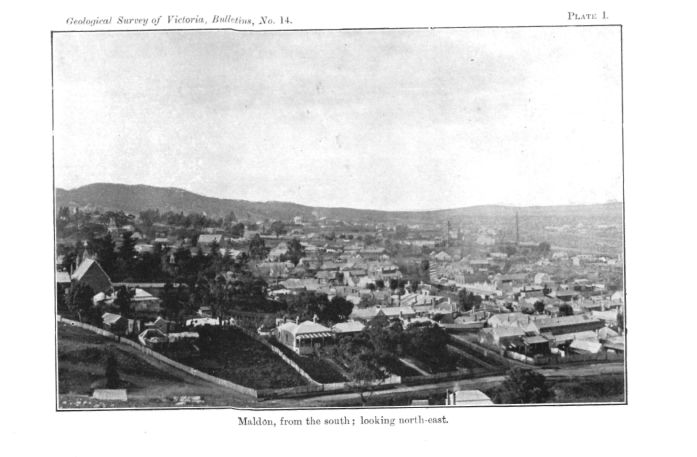
Maldon in 1904, seen from the south-west

In February 1854 the Victorian government arranged for the settlement to become a town, which was named Maldon. The post office had opened on 14 March 1854. The town's street plan is irregular and unlike more orderly subdivisions which relied on a gridiron pattern.

A market hall made of brick was erected in 1859 at a cost £1,250. It continued to serve as such till 1866 when it was converted into shire offices. A court house was built in 1861 and a new post and telegraph office in 1870.

In 1861, a government census declared the town's population to be 3341, servicing an additional 5,000-6,000 miners at the diggings. At that time it was the eighth-largest town in Victoria, and remained so for the next decade. However, as miners were forced to dig deeper to obtain usable specimens, or as mines ran dry completely, the population began to decline. By 1891, Maldon was reduced to 1,600 inhabitants. Mining of small claims continued through the 20th century, together with sluicing of gullies and tailings. In the 1980s, several new ventures commenced, including an open cut mine at Union Hill.

Maldon proved to be one of Victoria's richest quartz-mining centres, though with poorer alluvial results than others such as Castlemaine or Ballarat. Quartz mining extended southward through Sandy Creek to Newstead, along to Mia Mia and Muckleford, eastward to Fentimen's and Smith's Reefs, and even to near the peak of Mount Tarrangower. In all, over seventy reefs were proven to contain gold deposits. Maldon was known as a poor man's diggings, with many excellent yields from very small claims.

The Maldon Magistrates' Court closed on 1 November 1981, not having been visited by a Magistrate since 1972.

The Victorian Blue Light Youth Camp was established in 1987 and ran to September 2022.

== Modern times ==
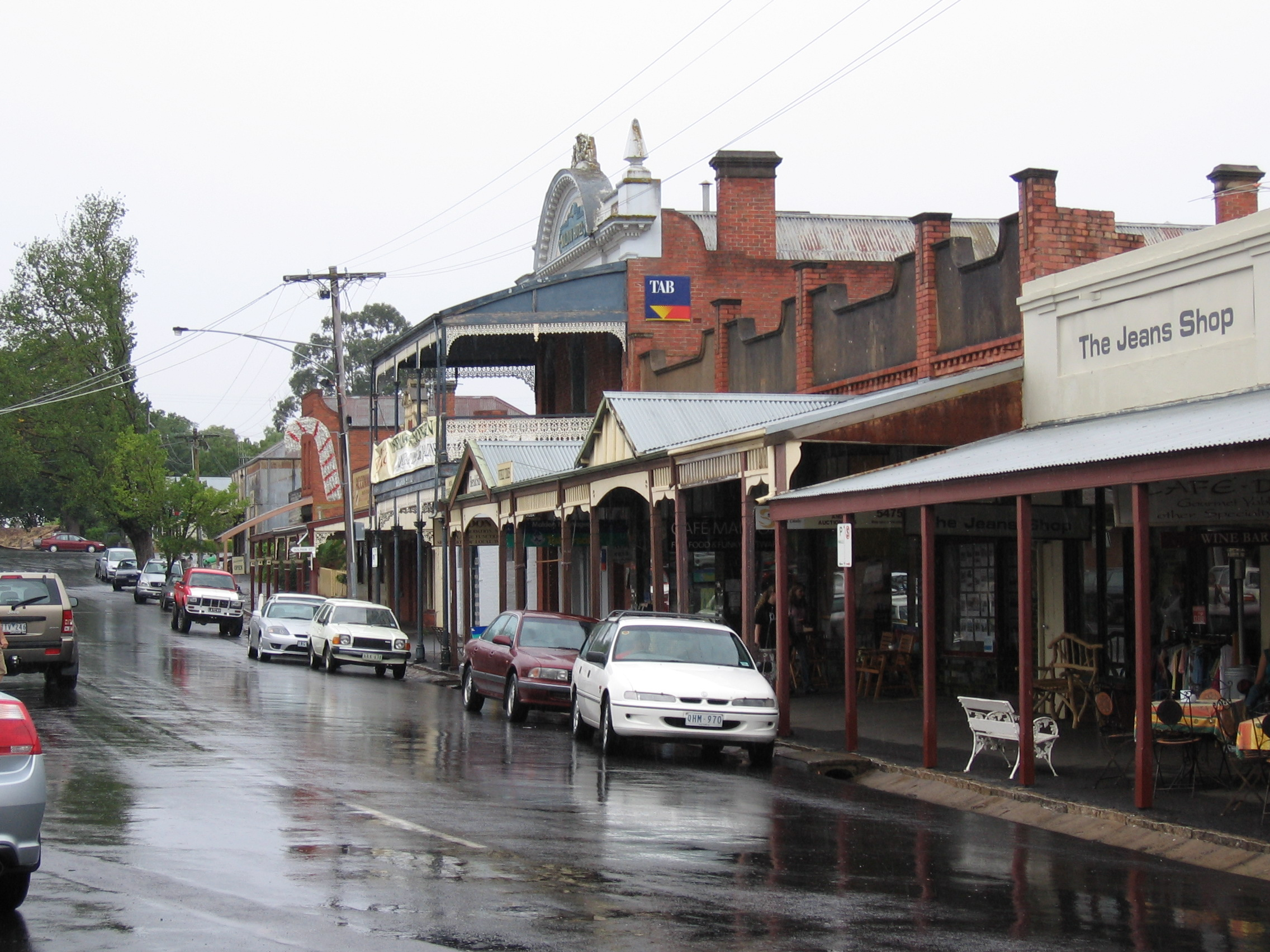
Historic streetscape at Maldon

Today, Maldon's population is more or less stable at around 1,500 people. The town was declared "Australia's first notable town" in 1966 by the National Trust of Victoria, who explained that:

The township displays overall historical and architectural importance, particularly in its gold town buildings. The significance lies in the variety of building styles, and the area of mining is of interest with one mine still open to the public. Maldon boasts that it is largely unchanged since the 1850s, and has attracted considerable interest from tourists for its 19th-century atmosphere.

Maldon is now sustained by its appeal as a retreat and retirement venue for artists and writers, as well as by the tourist trade. The town holds several annual fairs, including a Winter Fair, Easter Fair, Art Show, and Folk Festival. Notable landmarks include the Beehive Chimney, Mount Tarrengower and the fire tower, Lake Cairn Curran, and the Maldon railway station.

Maldon has its own newspaper, the Tarrangower Times, which was first published in 1858 and is the oldest continuously published newspaper in Victoria. The Maldon Museum and Archives Association displays a large collection of local artifacts and also operates a family-history research centre. The Museum is located in the former Maldon Shire Hall located in the Shire Gardens on High Street. The Maldon Vintage Machinery Museum houses stationary engines, farming implements, mining exhibits, fire pumps, and objects with links to Thompsons Foundry, Castlemaine.

The minimum-security female prison HM Prison Tarrengower is located to the near north of the township in the locality of Nuggety.

== Sport ==
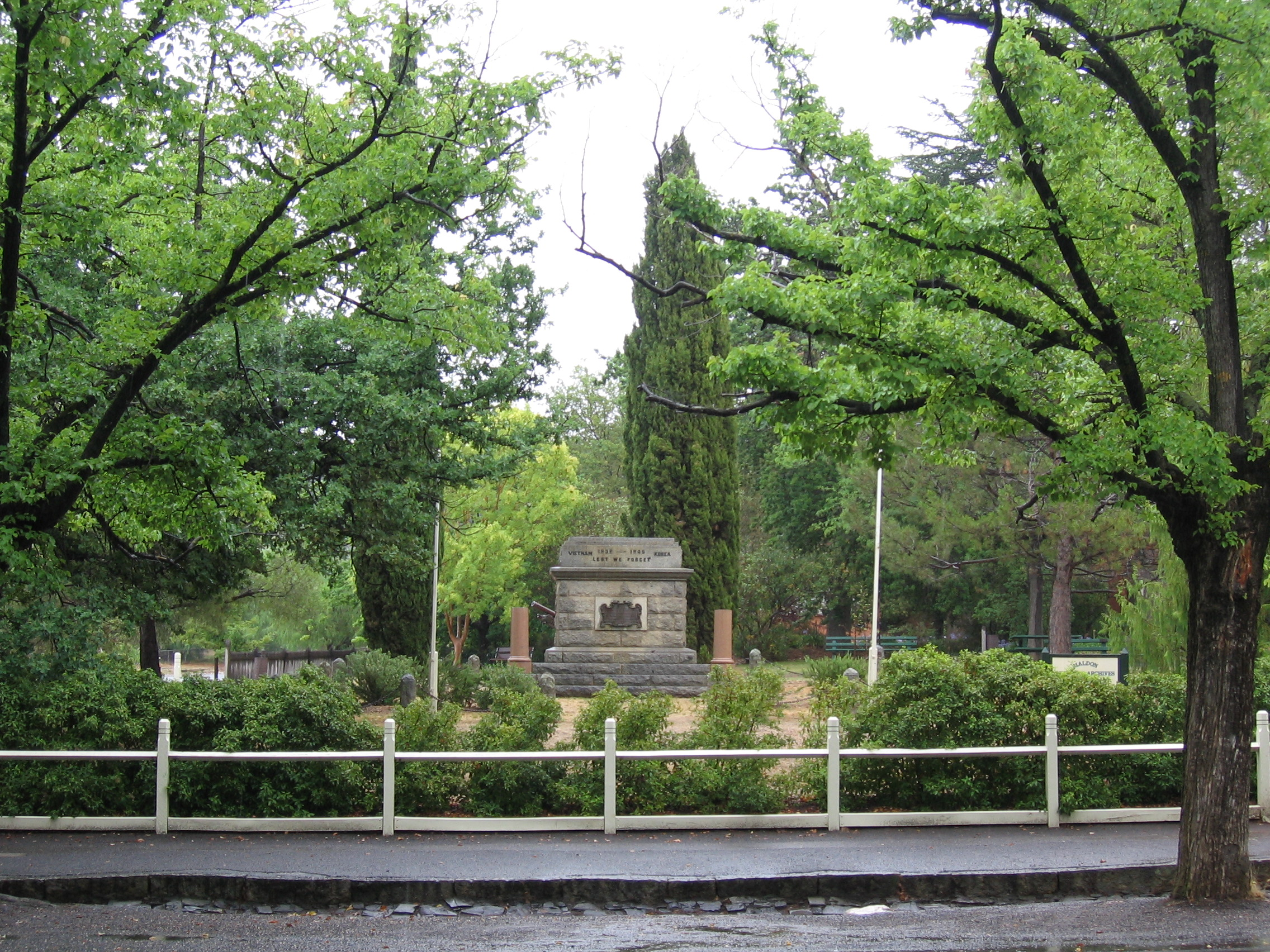
The memorial park at Maldon

Golfers play at the course of the Maldon Golf Club on Golf Links Road.

There is also a Croquet club, and a Lawn Bowls Club.

Maldon Football and Netball Club

The town has an Australian Rules football and netball club that has competed in the Maryborough Castlemaine District Football League since 1952.

Prior to 1952, Maldon competed in the Castlemaine District Football League from 1889 to 1951, winning 16 premierships in -

- 1894, 1896, 1898, 1899, 1900, 1901, 1902, 1904, 1905, 1906, 1908, 1914, 1920, 1923, 1933 and 1939.

== Events ==
The town has an annual Easter Fair which includes events such as billy-cart racing, dancing in the street, the Great Aussie Scone Bake, Torchlight Parade, Parade and the lighting of the Mount Tarrangower tower. The Maldon Folk Festival has been held annually since 1974, and now is always held the weekend before the Melbourne Cup.

== In popular culture ==
Much of the 2007 film Romulus, My Father, set in the 1950s and starring Eric Bana, was shot on location in Maldon. Romulus, My Father went on to win the Australian Film Institute award for Best Film. Maldon is also the location of the popular TV Series, the murder thriller: "Scrublands" released in 2023 and starring Luke Arnold, Bella Heathcote, Jay Ryan, Zane Ciarman

== Notable residents ==
- Bill Woodfull, former Australian cricket team captain, born in Maldon on 27 August 1897
- Joseph Jenkins, the Welsh Swagman, maintained Maldon's gutters and drains for one pound per week from 1885 to 1894
- Billy Robinson: 1914 Stawell Gift winner, 1915 Carlton VFL Premiership player.
- Henry Handel Richardson, the Australian author, spent some of her childhood in Maldon (1880–1886) when her mother was postmistress there, and wrote about the town in her memoir, Myself When Young, 1948
- Frank Arthur Nankivell, artist
- Louis Boldini, architect
- Howard Leslie Elliott, New Zealand Baptist minister, sectarian agitator and editor
- Kevin Moloney and Janetta Stones (Kevin & Janetta), tourists on travel TV series Travel Guides (2017–present)

== Gallery ==
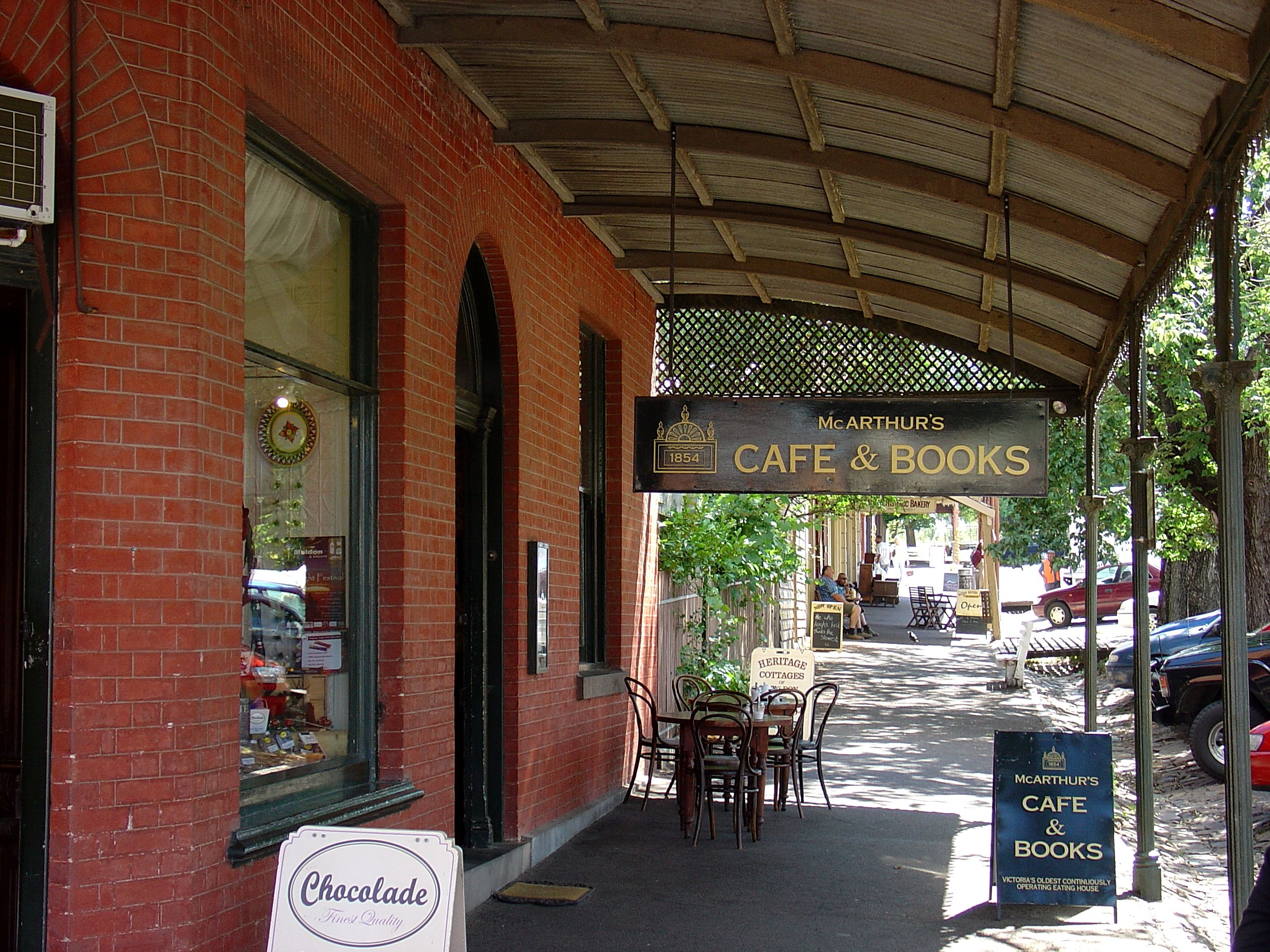
1900 McArthur's bakery shop

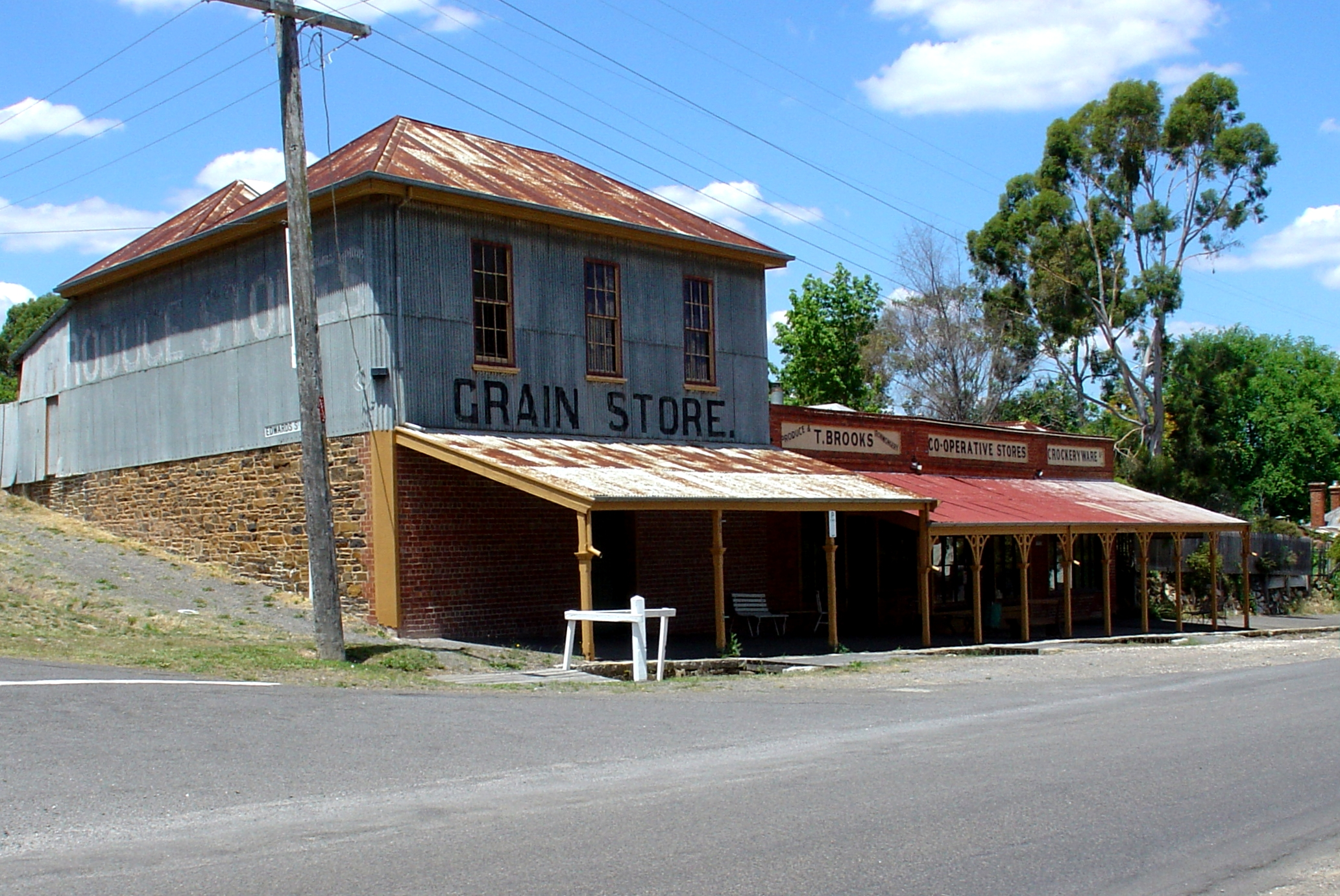
Old produce store and shops

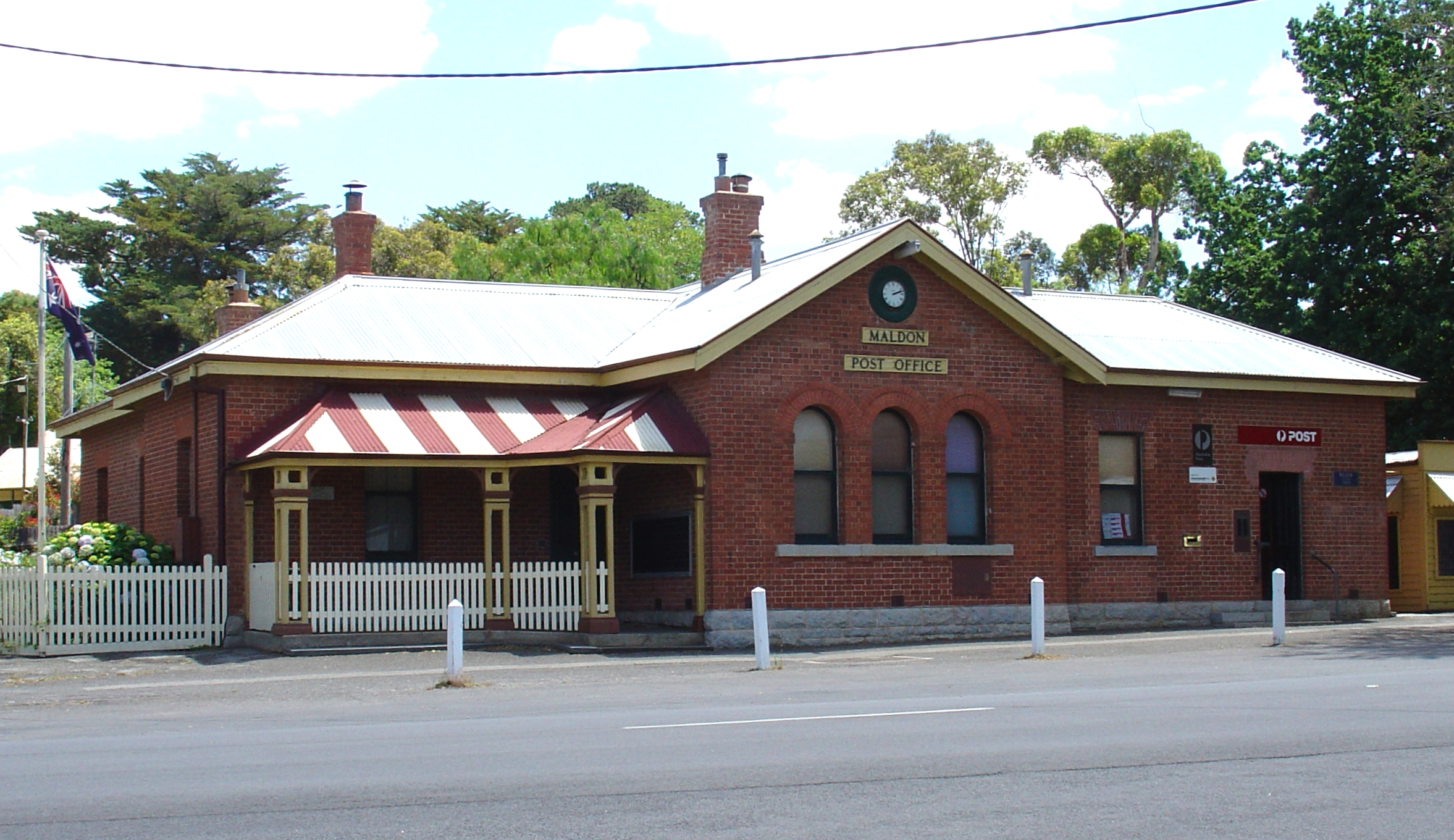
Maldon Post Office

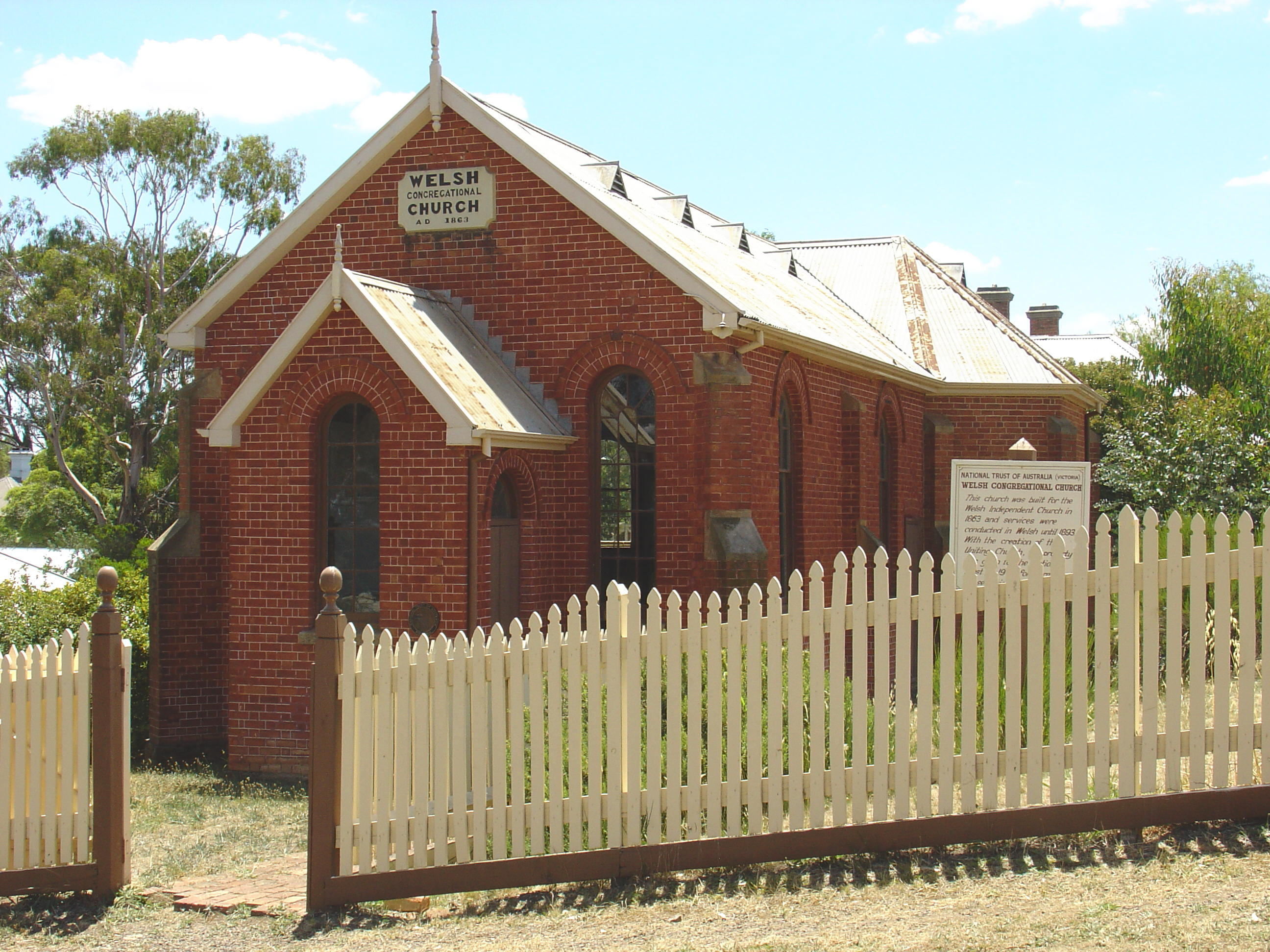
1863 Welsh Congregational Church

'Welsh Swagman' plaque at railway station

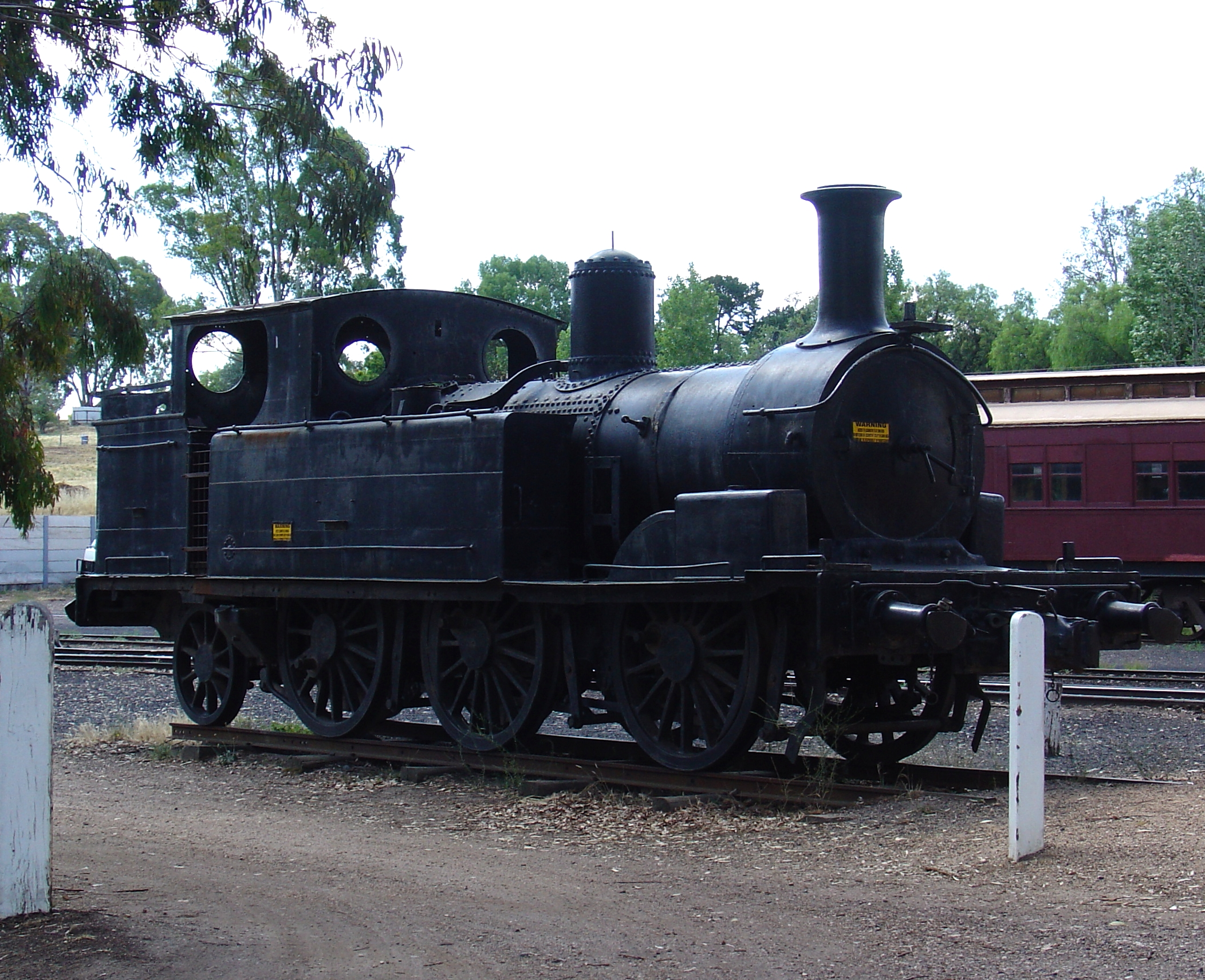
Historic railway engine

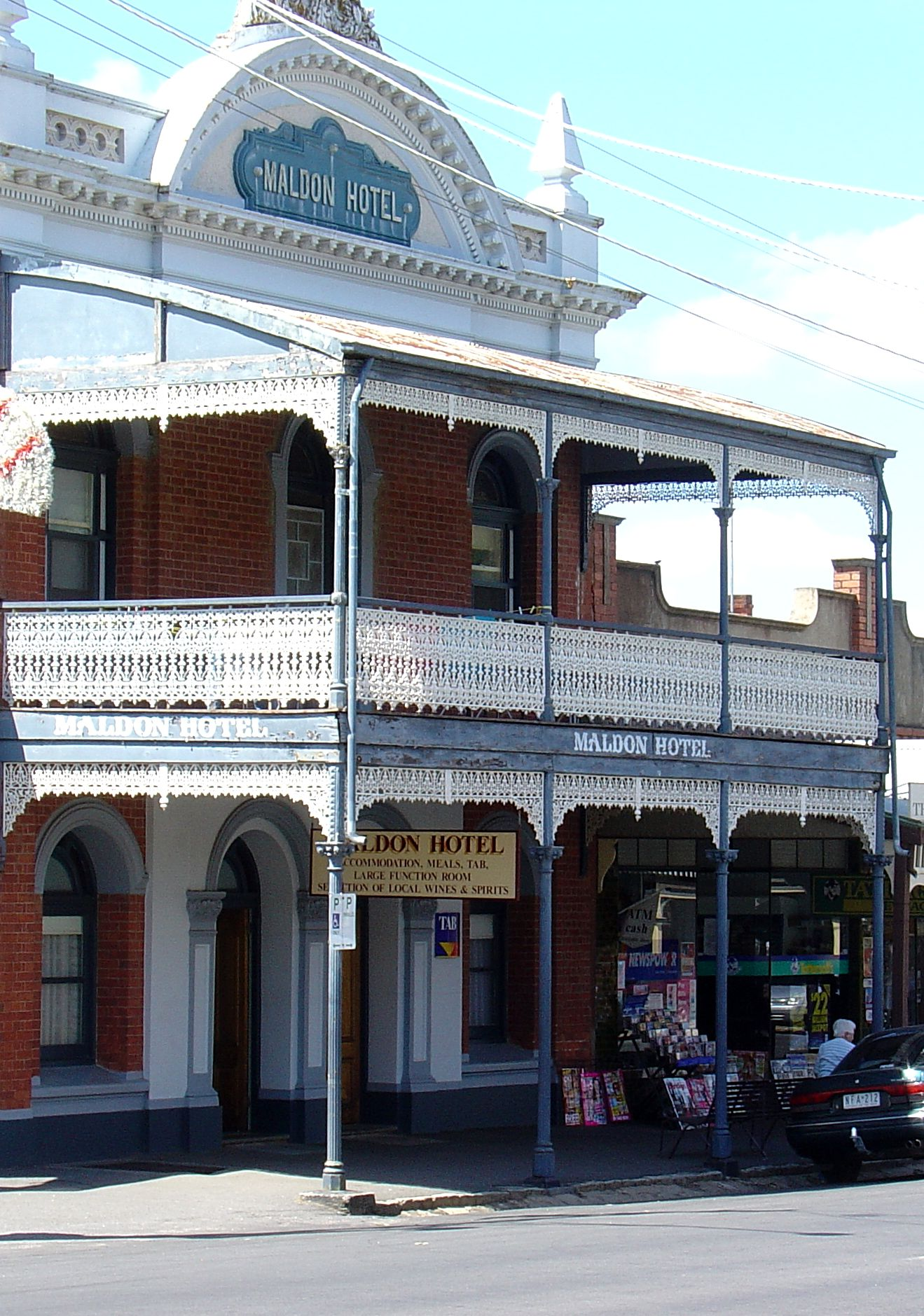
Maldon Hotel

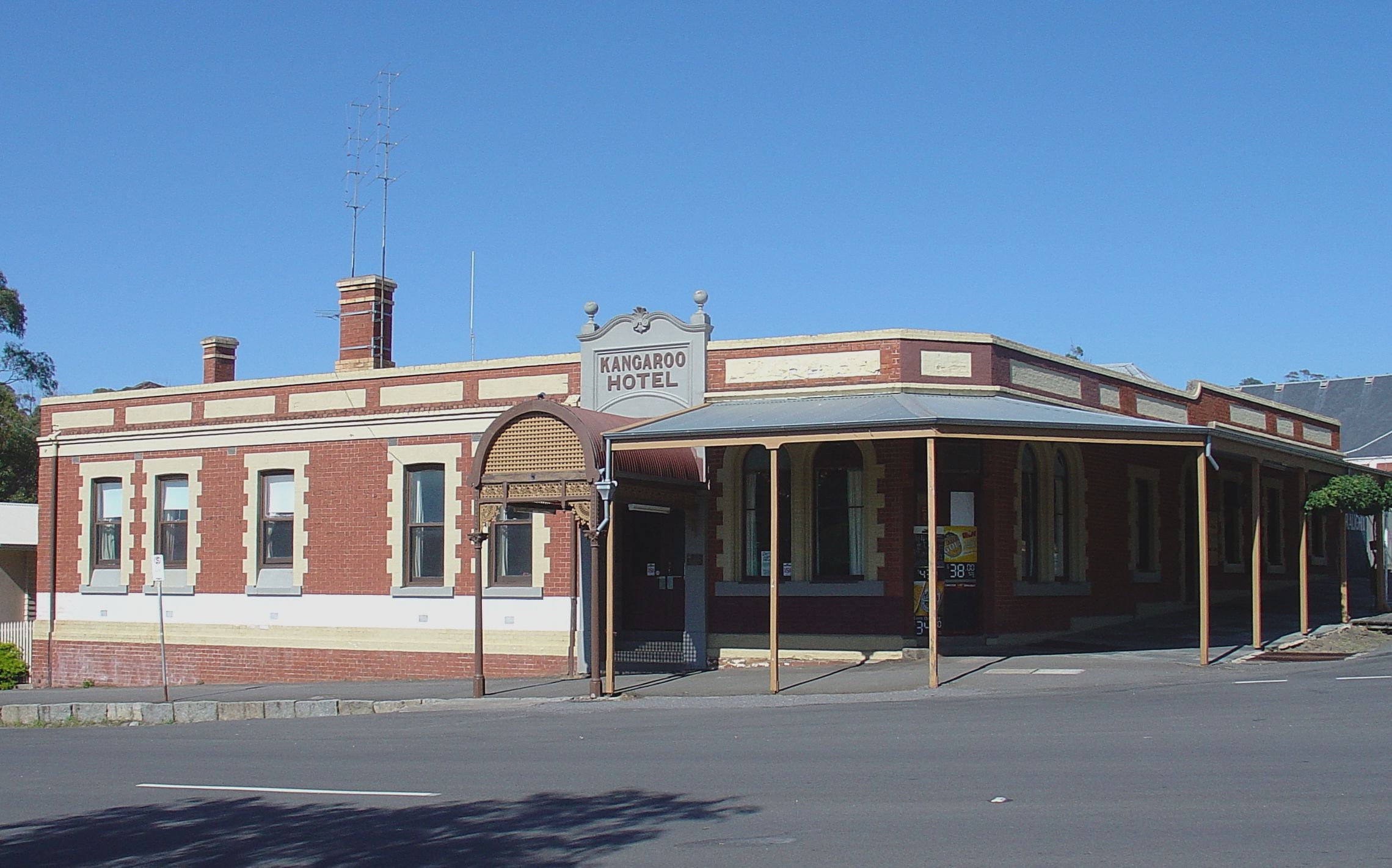
Kangaroo Hotel

Main Street, Maldon

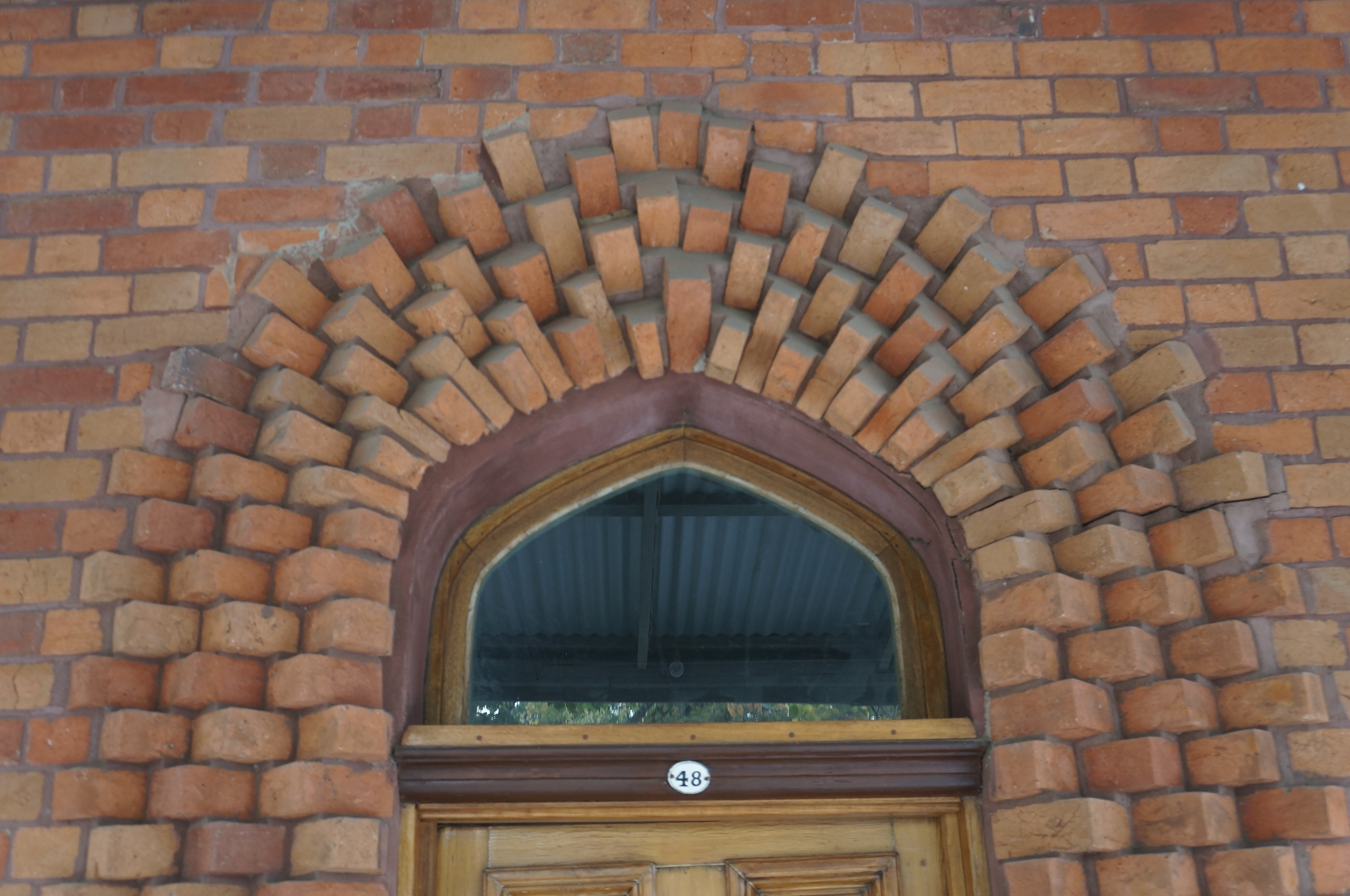
Maldon brickwork

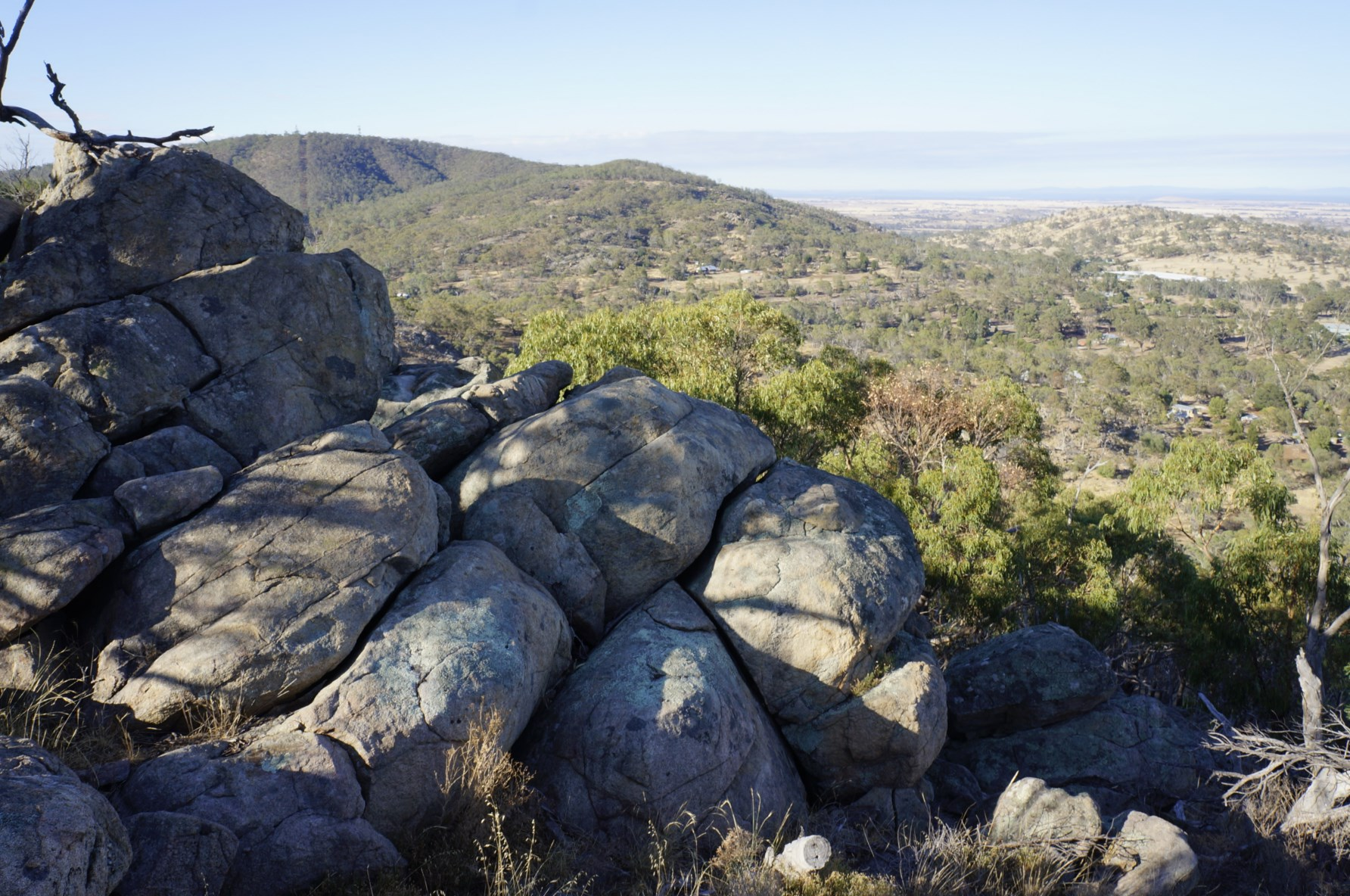
Rock of Ages lookout on Mount Mooral

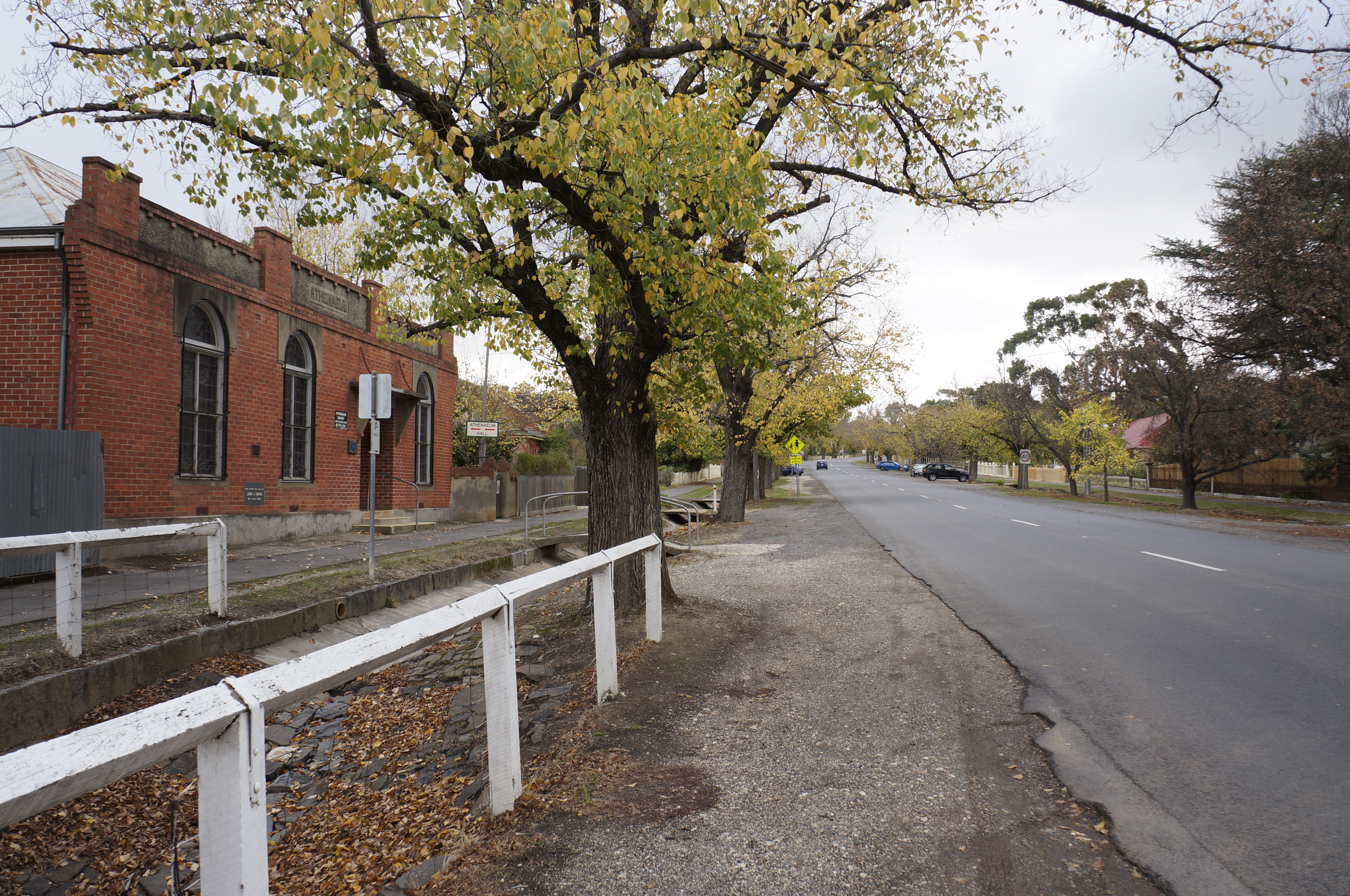
Maldon's Athenaeum library

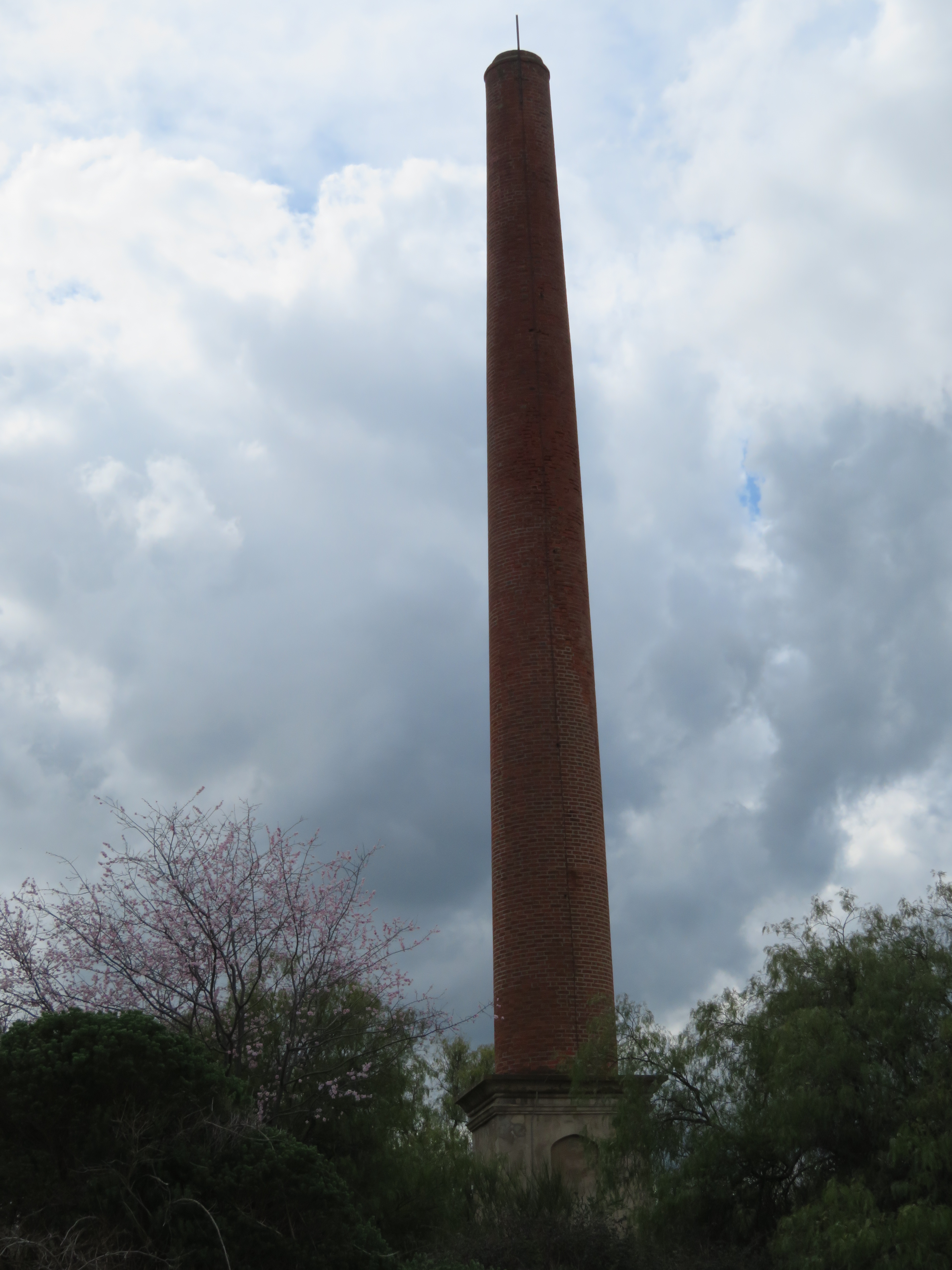
Maldon Beehive Mine Chimney in 2018

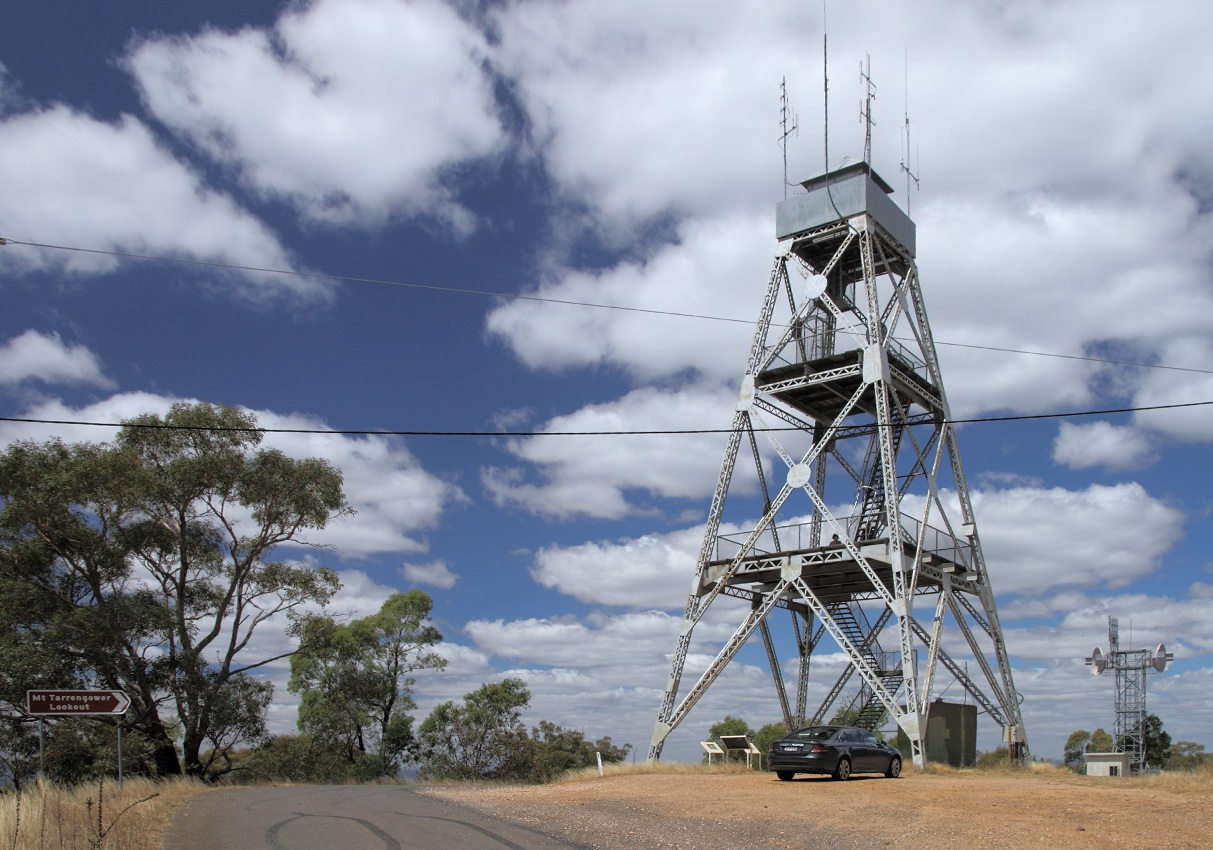
Mount Tarrengower Tower

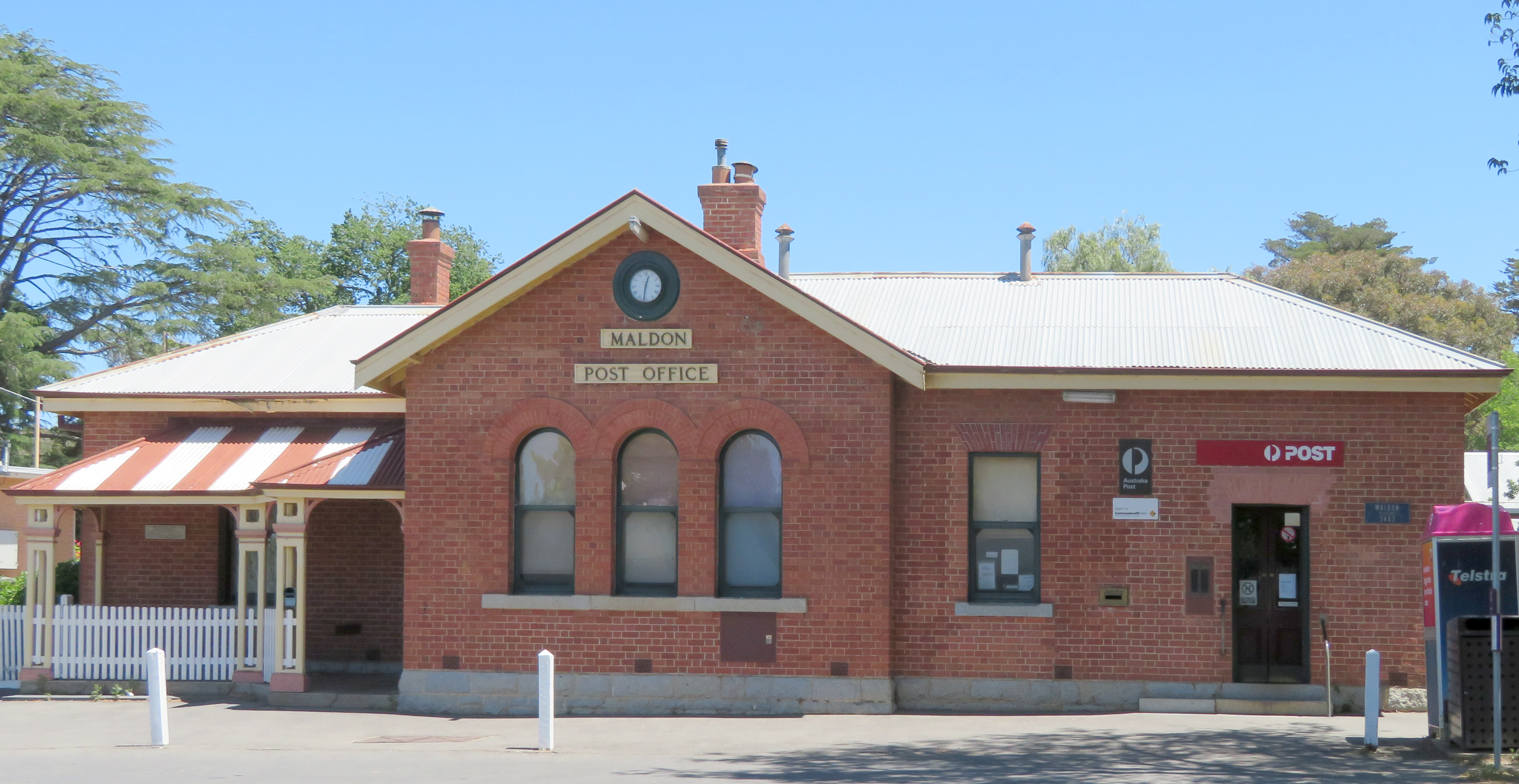
Maldon Post Office in 2018: home of HH Richardson 1880–86

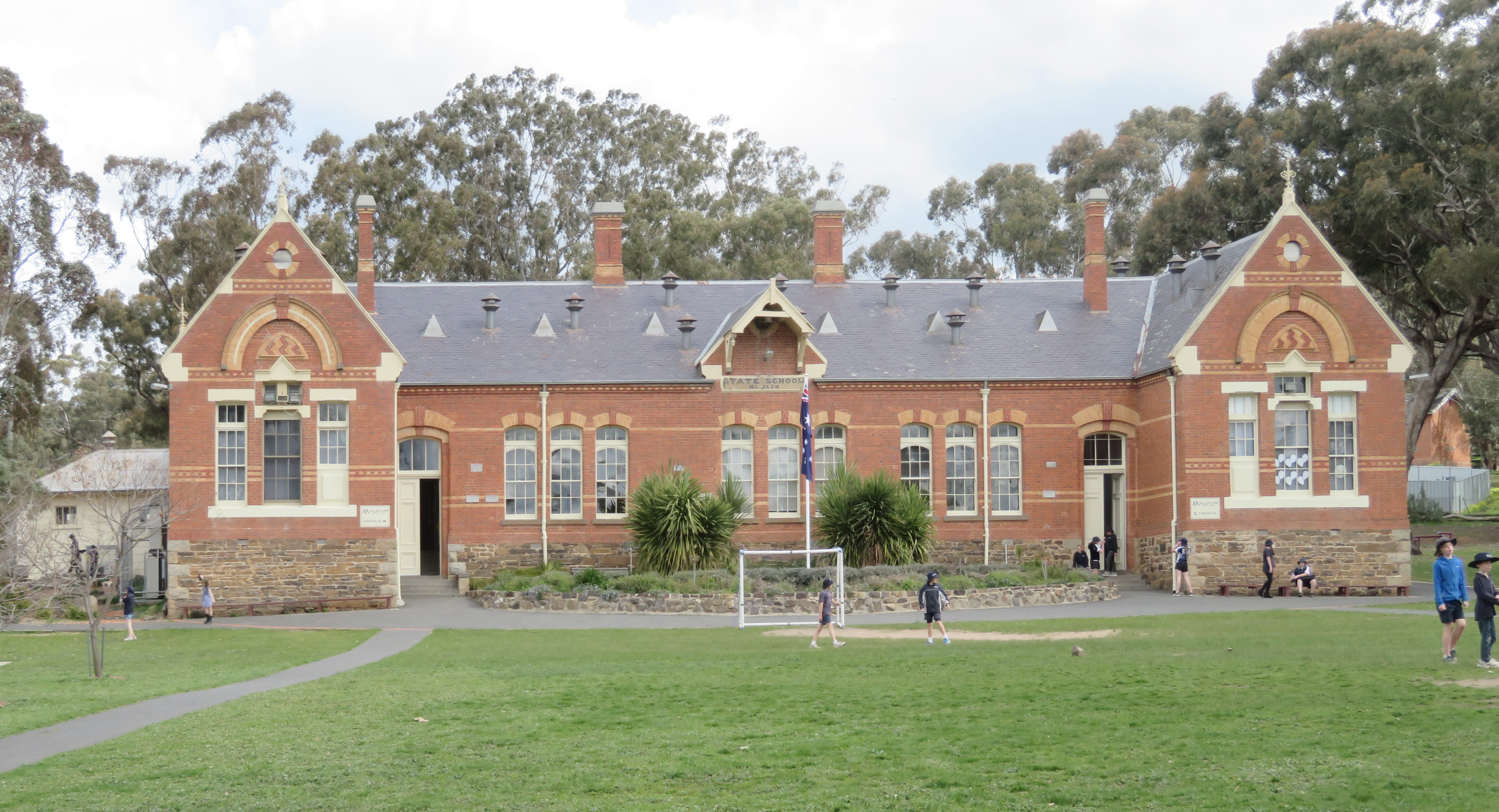
Maldon Primary School in 2018, in use since 1874

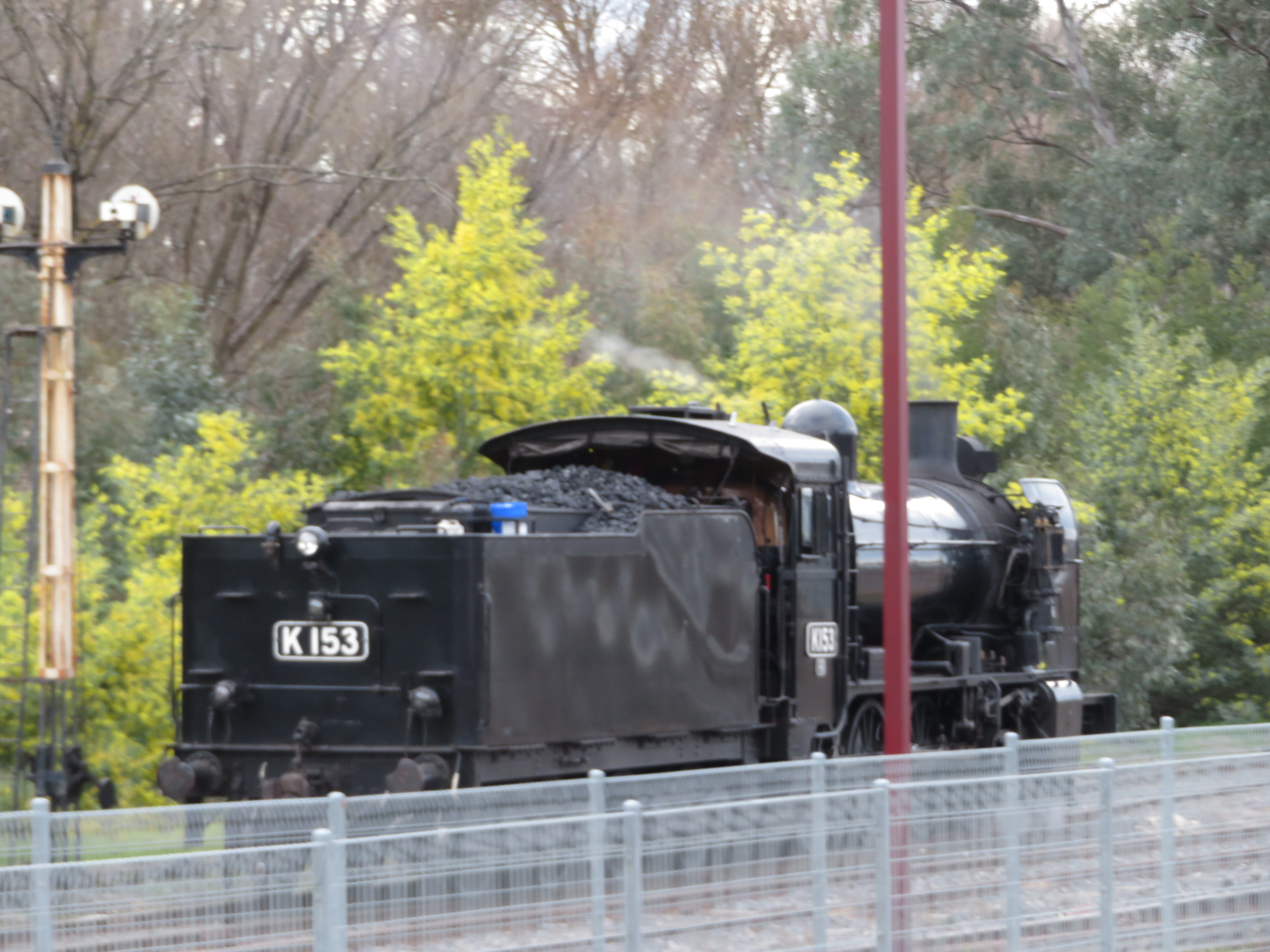
Maldon to Castlemaine Steam Train in 2018

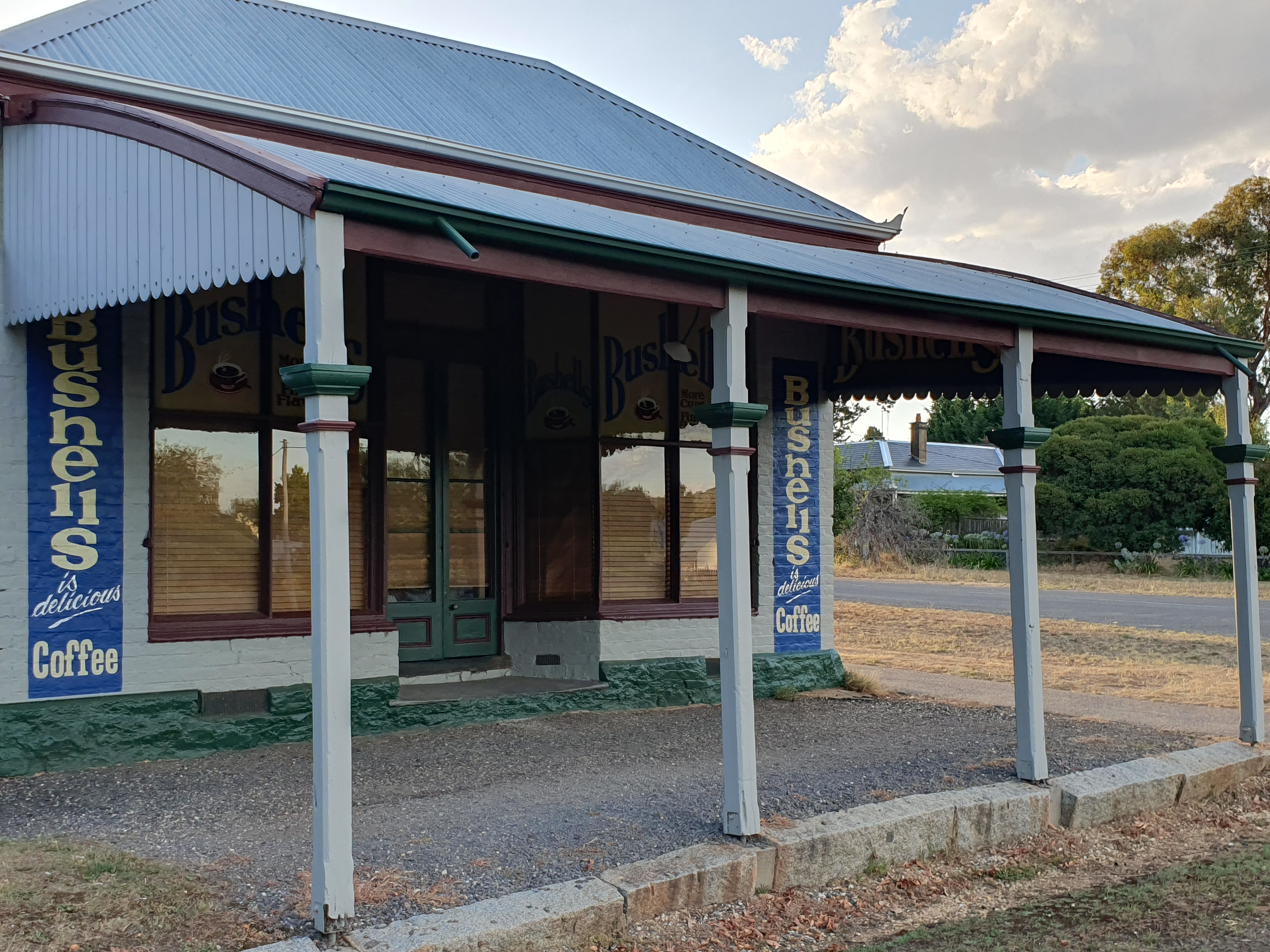
Bushells coffee house on Templeton St

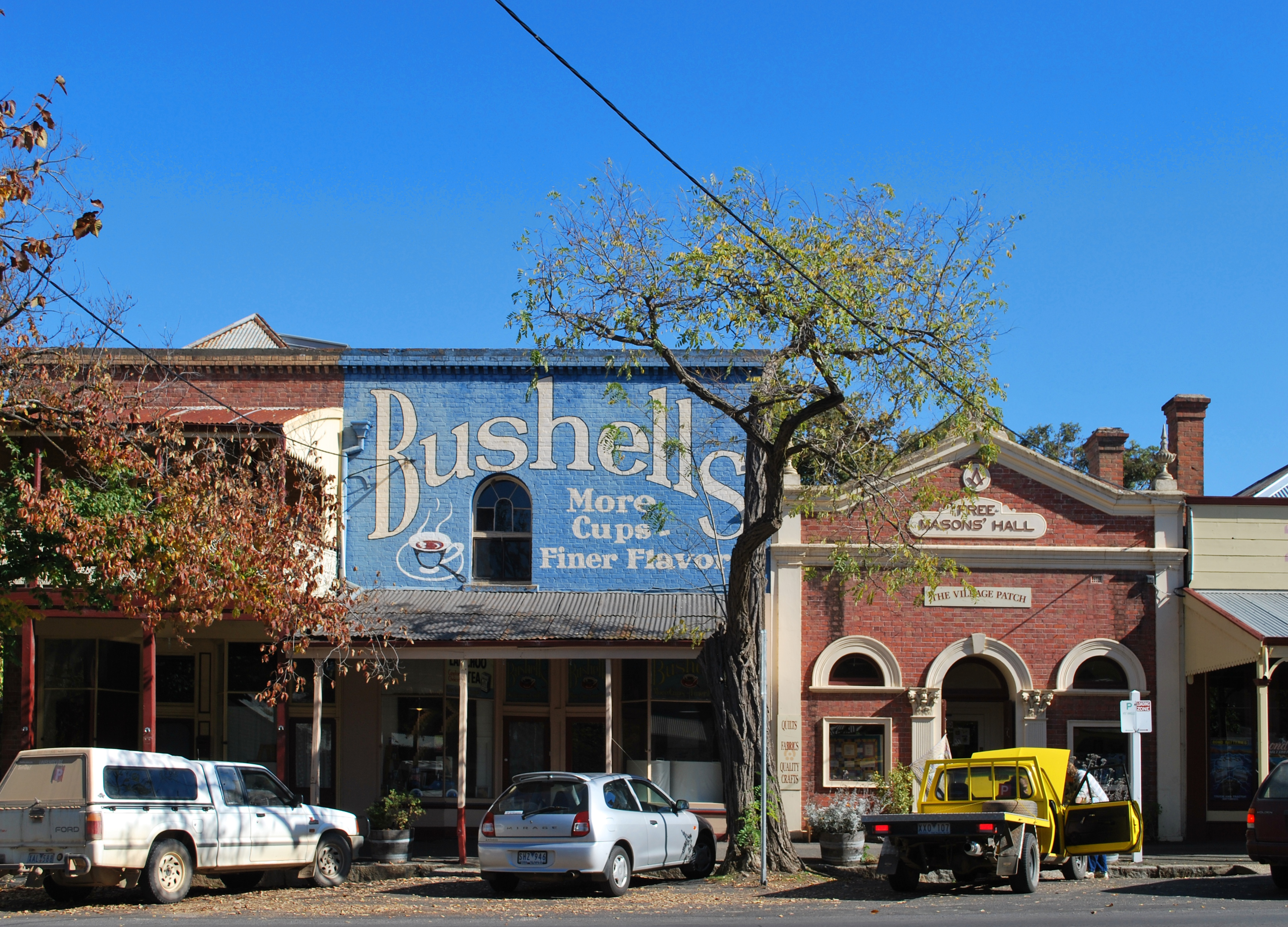
Bushells Tea advertisement painted on a shop. Next door is the Freemasons Hall.

== See also ==
- HM Prison Tarrengower
- Victorian Goldfields Railway
