= Ben Canaider =

Australian food writer

Ben Canaider (born in 1967) is an Australian writer specialising in drinks and alcoholic beverages - and their broader cultural and historical significance and meaning.

== Career ==
Canaider began writing about wine for newspapers and magazines at a time (c.2000) when Australia was embracing more liberal and relaxed attitudes to wine and food as a cultural touchstone. Speaking with an irreverent, everyman's voice, Canaider was soon published in real book form. His first book, The Perfect Glass of Wine, was an instant international best-seller, now published in three languages. He is the author of nine books, including the chef spoof, Cuisine du Moi: The Heart of My Passion, which is a fictional story about the "world's greatest chef," Gavin Canardeaux. He has also authored a cookbook - bringing fantasy back to reality - titled Cooking Under the Influence.

Canaider has also written for television, as well as appearing on Channel 7's hit lifestyle programme, Surprise Chef. He is a regular contributor to radio, and has worked for the ABC.

== Personal life ==
Canaider grew up in Sherbrooke, in the Dandenong Ranges to the east of Melbourne. He attended The University of Melbourne studying English, History, and Geography. His interests include meteorology and bicycles.
