= Howard Leslie Elliott =

New Zealand minister

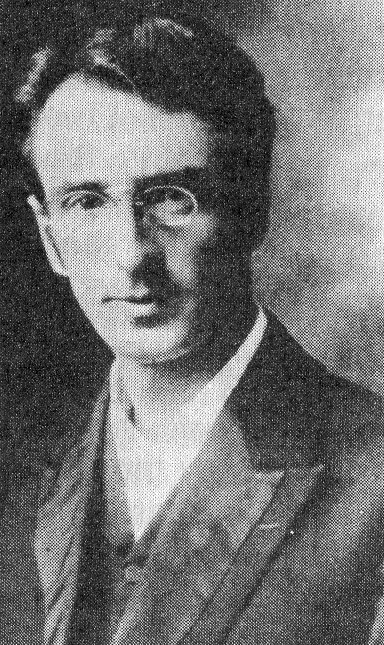
Howard Leslie Elliott, New Zealand Baptist minister, sectarian agitator and editor

Howard Leslie Elliott (10 March 1877 – 11 November 1956) was a New Zealand Baptist minister, sectarian agitator and editor. He was born in Maldon, Victoria, Australia on 10 March 1877.

He moved to New Zealand in 1909 where he was the pastor of the Mount Eden Baptist Church. In July 1917 he resigned his pastorate and founded the Protestant Political Association of New Zealand (PPA). He was also a member of the Orange Order. In the 1919 and 1922 elections the PPA endorsed most of the New Zealand Reform Party's candidates.

In 1930 he founded the New Zealand Financial Times. In the 1943 election he publicly endorsed John A. Lee's Democratic Labour Party.

Howard Elliott died in Te Awamutu on 11 November 1956.
