= Logie Award for Most Outstanding News Coverage or Public Affairs Report =

Australian television recognition

- Country: Australia
- Presented by: TV Week
- First award: 1970
- Currently held by: "Saving the Children" (Foreign Correspondent, ABC)
- Website: www.tvweeklogieawards.com.au

The Silver Logie for Most Outstanding News Coverage or Public Affairs Report is an award presented annually at the Australian TV Week Logie Awards. The award is given to recognise outstanding news or public affairs reporting.

The first award for news coverage was awarded at the 12th Annual TV Week Logie Awards ceremony, held in 1970 as Best News Reporting. In 1971, two awards were presented for Most Outstanding News Coverage and Most Outstanding Coverage Of Political Affairs with the latter changed to Outstanding Contribution To TV Journalism the following year. From 1973 they were Best News Coverage and Best Public Affairs Program. Over the years, these award categories have changed to recognise news reports, news or public affairs programs, special reports or public affairs reports.

At the 60th Annual TV Week Logie Awards in 2018, the industry voted awards for news and public affairs Most Outstanding News Coverage and Most Outstanding Public Affairs Report were combined to create the award for Most Outstanding News Coverage or Public Affairs Report.

== Winners and nominees ==
Key	Meaning
‡	Indicates the winner

=== Best News Reporting ===
Year	Winner	Network	Ref
1970	Steve Raymond, for stories on Marianne Faithfull and a mass teenage funeral at Warren in NSW‡	Network Ten	

=== Most Outstanding News Coverage ===
Year	Winner	Network	Ref
1971	Heinz Voelzer‡	ABC	
1972	Victoria-Springbok rugby match‡	—N/a	

=== Most Outstanding Coverage Of Political Affairs ===
Year	Winner	Network	Ref
1971	This Day Tonight‡	ABC	

=== Outstanding Contribution To TV Journalism ===
Year	Winner	Network	Ref
1972	Dateline '71‡	Network Ten	
1973	Caroline Jones‡	ABC	
1974	Steve Raymond‡	Nine Network	
1975	Federal File‡	Nine Network	
1977	"Cedar Bay", This Day Tonight‡	ABC	
1978	"The Werribee Incident", A Current Affair‡	Nine Network	

=== Best News Coverage ===
Year	Winner	Network	Ref
1973	George Street bombings‡	Nine Network	
1974	Balsa rafts Chile/Australia trip‡	0-10 Network	
1975	Frank Sinatra in Australia‡	Seven Network	

=== Best Public Affairs Program ===
Year	Winner	Network	Ref
1973	A Current Affair‡	Nine Network	
1974	A Current Affair‡	Nine Network	
1975	A Current Affair‡	Nine Network	
1976	A Current Affair‡	Nine Network	
1977	A Current Affair‡	Nine Network	
1978	Willesee at Seven‡	Seven Network	

=== Best News Report ===
Year	Winner	Network	Ref
1976	Timor report‡	Nine Network	
1977	Ahmad fire‡	Nine Network	
1978	Blue Mountains bushfires‡	Network Ten	
1979	Bank siege and chase‡	Nine Network	
1980	Star Hotel Riot‡	NBN-3	
1981	"Moreton Bay Rescue", Seven News‡	Seven Network	
1982	Boy Down Well‡	Seven Network	
1984	Ash Wednesday coverage‡	—N/a	
1985	Bank Siege‡	Seven Network	
1986	Eagle Farm Siege‡	TVQ	

=== Outstanding Public Affairs Report ===
Year	Winner	Network	Ref
1980	"Child Prostitution", Four Corners‡	ABC	
1981	"The Chelmsford File", 60 Minutes‡	Nine Network	
1982	"Never Say Die", 60 Minutes‡	Nine Network	
1983	"Annie", 60 Minutes‡	Nine Network	
1985	"The Education of Stephen Lusher", 60 Minutes‡	Nine Network	
1985	"Tax Summit", Sunday‡	Nine Network	

=== Most Outstanding Achievement in News ===
Year	Winner	Network	Ref
1987	"Russell Street Bombing"‡	Network Ten	
1988	"Hoddle St Massacre"‡	Seven Network	
1989	"Walsh Street murders", Michael Venus‡	Nine Network	
1990	"Romanian Revolution", Mark Burrows‡	Nine Network	
1991	"John Lombard"‡	ABC	
1992	"Coode Island Fires", National Nine News‡	Nine Network	
1993	"Bangkok Riots"‡	ABC	
1994	"Sydney 2000 Announcement"‡	Nine Network	
1995	"Rwanda Refugee Crisis"‡	ABC	
1996	"Muraroa Protests", National Nine News‡	Nine Network	
1997	"Port Arthur Massacre", ABC News‡	ABC	
1998	"Thredbo Tragedy", Seven Nightly News‡	Seven Network	
1998	"Travel Rorts"	—N/a	
1998	"Thredbo Tragedy"	—N/a	

=== Most Outstanding Achievement in Public Affairs ===
Year	Winner	Network	Ref
1987	"Coup D'Etat", ABC News‡	ABC	
1988	Four Corners‡	ABC	
1989	Four Corners‡	ABC	
1990	"True Believers", Four Corners‡	ABC	
1991	"Other People's Money", Four Corners‡	ABC	
1992	"The Soviet Union", Lateline‡	ABC	
1993	The Investigators‡	ABC	
1994	"Ships of Shame", Sunday‡	Nine Network	
1995	"Inside a Holocaust", Four Corners‡	ABC	
1996	"Minor Surgery, Major Risk", Four Corners‡	ABC	
1997	"The Prisoners Who Waited", Sunday‡	Nine Network	
1998	"Where Does The Buck Stop?", Four Corners‡	ABC	
1998	"Showdown in Emerald", Sunday	Nine Network	
1998	"Valentine's Day", Australian Story	ABC	

=== Most Outstanding Public Affairs Program ===
Year	Program	Network	Ref
1999	"Balibo Five", Foreign Correspondent‡	ABC	
1999	"Dancing with Strangers", Australian Story	ABC	
1999	60 Minutes	Nine Network	
1999	Sunday	Nine Network	

=== Most Outstanding Documentary or Special Report in a Public Affairs Program ===
Year	Program	Network	Ref
2000	"Facing the Demons"‡	ABC	
2000	"A Race to Survive", Four Corners	ABC	
2000	"Sierra Leone", Dateline	SBS	
2000	"The Keating Millions", 60 Minutes	Nine Network	

=== Most Outstanding Special Report in a Public Affairs Program ===
Year	Program	Network	Ref
2001	"Fixing Cricket", Four Corners‡	ABC	
2001	"Balibo: The Simple Truth", Dateline	SBS	
2001	"On Life's Border: The Struggle of North Korea's Refugees", Dateline	SBS	
2001	"Sierra Leone", Foreign Correspondent	ABC	
2002	"See No Evil" and "The Dirty War", Dateline‡	SBS	
2002	"The Body Snatchers", Sunday	Nine Network	
2002	"Party Tricks", Four Corners	ABC	
2002	"Wahid—Inside the Palace Walls", Foreign Correspondent	ABC	

=== Most Outstanding News Coverage ===
Year	Program	Network	Ref
1999	"Indonesia Crisis", ABC News‡	ABC	
1999	"Papua New Guinea Tidal Wave", National Nine News	Nine Network	
1999	"Linton Bushfires (Victoria)", Seven Nightly News	Seven Network	
1999	"The Waterfront Dispute", National Nine News	Nine Network	
2000	"Timor", Seven Nightly News‡	Seven Network	
2000	"East Timor", ABC News	ABC	
2000	"Liberation Day in Kosovo"	Nine Network	
2000	"The East Timor Crisis"	SBS	
2001	"World Economic Forum/S11 Protests", National Nine News‡	Nine Network	
2001	"East Timor", ABC News	ABC	
2001	"Middle East", ABC News	ABC	
2001	"Shoot-out in Suva", National Nine News	Nine Network	
2002	"Afghanistan", ABC News‡	ABC	
2002	"September 12th", ABC News	ABC	
2002	"America Under Attack", National Nine News	Nine Network	
2002	"NSW Christmas Bushfires", Seven News	Seven Network	
2002	"Tampa Crisis", Seven News	Seven Network	
2003	"The al-Qaeda Tapes", ABC News‡	ABC	
2003	"Bali Bombing", ABC News	ABC	
2003	"Bali Explosion", National Nine News	Nine Network	
2003	"Bushfires", Seven News	Seven Network	
2003	"The New Kurdistan", Dateline	SBS	
2004	"Marine's fire", ABC News‡	ABC	
2004	"Canberra bushfires", National Nine News	Nine Network	
2004	"Waterfall disaster", Seven News	Seven Network	
2005	"Tsunami: 30 December 2004", National Nine News‡	Nine Network	
2005	"Beslan", National Nine News	Nine Network	
2005	"Iraq Hostage", ABC News	ABC	
2005	"Victoria Ganglands", ABC News	ABC	
2005	"Tsunami Disaster", Ten News	Network Ten	
2006	"Aceh: Last Man Standing", ABC News‡	ABC	
2006	"The Bali Nine", Ten News	Network Ten }	
2006	"New Orleans Rescue", Seven News	Seven Network	
2006	"Schapelle Corby Verdict", Seven News	Seven Network	
2006	"Vivian Solon", Lateline	ABC	
2007	"Sexual Abuse in Aboriginal Communities", Lateline‡	ABC	
2007	"Escaping the Border", ABC News	ABC }	
2007	"Escaping the Mine", Sunrise	Seven Network	
2007	"Scully Sacking", National Nine News	Nine Network	
2007	"Sexual Abuse of the Elderly", Lateline	ABC	
2008	"Garuda Plane Crash", Seven News‡	Seven Network	
2008	"East Timor: Finding Alfredo", Foreign Correspondent	ABC }	
2008	"Federal Election"	Sky News	
2008	"Pasha Bulker", National Nine News	Nine Network	
2008	"Timor Baucau", SBS World News	SBS	
2009	"China Earthquake", ABC News‡	ABC	
2009	"Brisbane Storms", Seven News	Seven Network	
2009	"China Earthquake", Nine News Sydney	Nine Network	
2009	"Financial Crisis"	Sky News Business	
2009	"Nike Human Rights Investigation", Seven News	Seven Network	
2010	"Victorian Bushfires", Seven News‡	Seven Network	
2010	"Bushfire Disaster", Ten News Victoria	Network Ten	
2010	"Godwin Grech", ABC News	ABC	
2010	"Samoan Tsunami", Nine News	Nine Network	
2010	"Victorian Bushfires", ABC News	ABC	
2011	"New Zealand Mine Disaster", Seven News‡	Seven Network	
2011	"Afghanistan Rocket Attack", Ten News	Network Ten	
2011	"Election 2010"	Sky News Australia	
2011	"Laurie Oakes Election Leaks", Nine News	Nine Network	
2011	"Pakistan Floods", ABC News	ABC	
2012	"The Queensland Floods", Nine News‡	Nine Network	
2012	"Lockyer Valley Flood", Seven News Brisbane	Seven Network	
2012	"Qantas Grounded", Sky News National	Sky News Australia	
2012	"Skype Scandal", Ten News at Five	Network Ten	
2012	"Unfinished Business", SBS World News Australia	SBS	
2013	"Catholic Church Allegedly Hid Crimes of Paedophile Priests", Lateline‡	ABC	
2013	"Baden-Clay", Nine News	Nine Network	
2013	"Cabinet Leaks", Seven News Sydney	Seven Network	
2013	"Fukushima", ABC News	ABC	
2013	"Rudd Vs Gillard Leadership Challenge", Sky News	—N/a	
2014	"NSW Bushfires", Nine News‡	Nine Network	
2014	"Crisis in Cairo" — Brett Mason, World News Australia	SBS	
2014	"Leadership Spill"	Sky News	
2014	"Missing the Boat" – Jaymes Diaz interview, Ten Eyewitness News	Network Ten	
2014	"The Dark Side of the Force", Seven News	Seven Network	
2015	"Lindt Café Siege", Seven News‡	Seven Network	
2015	"Moree", NITV News	NITV	
2015	"Peter Greste Trial", 7pm News	ABC	
2015	"Sydney Siege", Nine News	Nine Network	
2015	"What Is Metadata", Sky News	Foxtel	
2016	"Parramatta Shooting", Seven News‡	Seven Network	
2016	"Iraq-Syria War Coverage", ABC 7pm News	ABC	
2016	"Liberal Leadership Crisis: Abbott v Turnbull", Sky News	Foxtel	
2016	"Migrant Crisis - Special Report", ABC 7pm News	ABC	
2016	"Paris Attack", Seven News	Seven Network	
2017	"Sky News Election Coverage 2016" Sky News Live‡	Foxtel	
2017	"Bankstown Hospital", Nine News	Nine Network	
2017	"Federal Election 2016", Seven News	Seven Network	
2017	"Inside Syria", SBS World News	SBS	
2017	"S.A. Waste Dump", NITV News	NITV	

=== Most Outstanding Public Affairs Report ===
Year	Program	Network	Ref
2004	"The Big A (Hazel Hawke Story)", Australian Story‡	ABC	
2004	"Aceh (In Bed With The TNI)", Dateline	SBS	
2004	"Inside Nauru (Pacific Despair)", Dateline	SBS	
2004	"The Jesuits", The 7.30 Report	ABC	
2004	"Making a Killing", 60 Minutes	Nine Network	
2005	"Into the Forest (Ivan Milat) Part 1", Australian Story‡	ABC	
2005	"Beslan Prepares for a Funeral", The 7.30 Report	ABC	
2005	"Coming Clean: Drugs and Cycling", 60 Minutes	Nine Network	
2005	"The Trials of Mamdouh Habib", Dateline	SBS	
2005	"Taliban Country", Dateline	SBS	
2006	"The Gathering Storm", Australian Story‡	ABC	
2006	"After the Waves: Asia's Tsunami, One Year On", The 7.30 Report	ABC	
2006	"Inside Indonesia's Sex Trade", Dateline	SBS	
2006	"Hands Off", 60 Minutes	Nine Network	
2006	"Melbourne Confidential", Four Corners	ABC	
2007	"The Terri Irwin Interview"‡	Nine Network	
2007	"Abu Ghraib", Dateline	SBS	
2007	"Four Days in Dili", Dateline	SBS	
2007	"The Great Escape: Brant Webb and Todd Russell"	Nine Network	
2007	"The Mourning After", Australian Story	ABC	
2008	"Some Meaning in This Life: Belinda Emmett", Australian Story‡	ABC	
2008	"The Big Sting", 60 Minutes	Nine Network	
2008	"Final Call", Four Corners	ABC	
2008	"Hicks On Trial", Insight	SBS	
2008	"Rwanda: Questions of Murder", Dateline	SBS	
2009	"Afghanistan: A Survivor's Tale", Foreign Correspondent‡	ABC	
2009	"Friday's Child", Australian Story	ABC	
2009	"Mugabe's Calling Card", Dateline	SBS	
2009	"Out of Control", 60 Minutes	Nine Network	
2009	"Timor War Criminal", Today Tonight	Seven Network	
2010	"Code of Silence", Four Corners‡	ABC	
2010	"Liberal Leadership Meltdown"	Sky News Australia	
2010	"Matthew Johns Interview", A Current Affair	Nine Network	
2010	"Proof of Life", Australian Story	ABC	
2010	"Rising from the Ashes", 60 Minutes	Nine Network	
2011	"Smugglers' Paradise", Four Corners‡	ABC	
2011	"Brothers in Arms", Sunday Night	Seven Network	
2011	"The Condemned", Dateline	SBS	
2011	"Hey Dad..! Scandal", A Current Affair	Nine Network	
2011	"Iraq's Deadly Legacy", Dateline	SBS	
2012	"A Bloody Business", Four Corners‡	ABC	
2012	After The Deluge: The Valley	ABC	
2012	"Rescue 500", Sunday Night	Seven Network	
2012	"Salma in the Square", Foreign Correspondent	ABC	
2012	Tour of Duty: Australia's Secret War	Network Ten	
2013	"Captain Emad: Smugglers' Paradise – Australia", Four Corners‡	ABC	
2013	"Abducted!", 60 Minutes	Nine Network	
2013	"Anatomy of a Massacre", Dateline	SBS	
2013	"The World According to Lance (Lance Armstrong)", Four Corners	ABC	
2013	"Unholy Silence (Catholic Church)", Four Corners	ABC	
2014	"Prisoner X" — The Australian Connection, Foreign Correspondent‡	ABC	
2014	"A Gracious Gift", Four Corners	ABC	
2014	"Drugs in Sport" — Stephen Dank, 7.30	ABC	
2014	"Manus Island", Dateline	SBS	
2014	"Prime Suspect", Sunday Night	Seven Network	
2015	"Banking Bad", Four Corners‡	ABC	
2015	"Ian Thorpe – The Parkinson Interview", Ian Thorpe – The Parkinson Interview	Network Ten	
2015	"Ice Towns", The Feed	SBS	
2015	"Joining the Fight", Insight	SBS	
2015	"Searching for C11", Australian Story	ABC	
2016	The Killing Season‡	ABC	
2016	"Catching a Monster", 60 Minutes	Nine Network	
2016	Hitting Home	ABC	
2016	"Making a Killing", Four Corners	ABC	
2016	"The Siege Survivors", 60 Minutes	Nine Network	
2017	"Australia's Shame", Four Corners‡	ABC	
2017	"Anita Cobby: You Thought You Knew It All…", Seven News Investigates	Seven Network	
2017	"George Pell Investigation", 7.30	ABC	
2017	"Good Cop, Bad Cop", 60 Minutes	Nine Network	
2017	"Money For Nothing", Four Corners	ABC	

=== Most Outstanding Public Affairs Program ===
Year	Program	Network	Ref
2003	Sunday‡	Nine Network	
2003	The 7.30 Report	ABC	
2003	Dateline	SBS	
2003	Foreign Correspondent	ABC	
2003	Lateline	ABC	

=== Most Outstanding News Coverage or Public Affairs Report ===
Year	Program	Network	Ref
2018	"The Siege", Four Corners‡	ABC	
2018	"Don Burke Special", A Current Affair	Nine Network	
2018	"Escape From Salt Creek", 60 Minutes	Nine Network	
2018	"Haiti Uncovered", Sunday Night	Seven Network	
2018	"Pumped", Four Corners	ABC	
2019	"Out Of The Dark", Four Corners‡	ABC	
2019	"James Comey Interview", 7.30	ABC	
2019	"Leadership Spill", Sky News	Foxtel	
2019	"Townsville Flood Disaster", Seven News	Seven Network	
2019	"Who Cares?", Four Corners	ABC	
2022	"Brittany Higgins Interview", The Project‡	Network Ten	
2022	"Nazi's Next Door", 60 Minutes	Nine Network	
2022	"War In Ukraine", Seven News	Seven Network	
2022	"Bursting The Canberra Bubble", Four Corners	ABC	
2022	"Intimate Terrorism", Insight	SBS	
2023	"Saving the Children", Foreign Correspondent‡	ABC	
2023	"Turkey Earthquake", Seven News	Seven Network	
2023	"Seaworld Helicopter Disaster", A Current Affair	Nine Network	
2023	"Somalia: A Story of Survival", Foreign Correspondent	ABC	
2023	"Do No Harm", Four Corners	ABC	
2023	"How Many More", Four Corners	ABC	
