= Logie Award for Most Popular Australian Program =

Australian television award

- Country: Australia
- Presented by: TV Week
- First award: 1961
- Final award: 2004

Highlights
- Most awards: State Affair (15)
- Website: www.tvweeklogieawards.com.au

The Silver Logie for Most Popular Australian Program was an award presented at the Australian TV Week Logie Awards. The award was given to recognise the popularity of Australian programs, originally state based awards and then awarded nationally.

It was first awarded at the 3rd Annual TV Week Logie Awards ceremony, held in 1961 when the award was originally called Most Popular Program. This award category was eliminated in 1966 and replaced by the Most Popular Live Show category. It was reintroduced in 1968 and renamed Best Show. Over the years, this category has also been known as Best Local Show (1970), Most Popular Show (1971, 1973–1985), Most Popular Series (1993–1997) and Most Popular Australian Program (2003–2004).

State Affair holds the record for the most wins, with fifteen, followed by Adelaide Tonight, The Mike Walsh Show and Neighbours with nine wins each.

== National ==
Key	Meaning
‡	Indicates the winning program

Year	Program	Network	Ref
1989	Neighbours‡	Network Ten	
1990	Neighbours‡	Network Ten	
1992	E Street‡	Network Ten	
1993	Home and Away‡	Seven Network	
1994	Home and Away‡	Seven Network	
1995	Home and Away‡	Seven Network	
1996	Home and Away‡	Seven Network	
1997	Blue Heelers‡	Seven Network	
1998	Blue Heelers‡	Seven Network	
1998	Hey Hey It's Saturday	Nine Network	
1998	Home and Away	Seven Network	
1998	Midday with Kerri-Anne	Nine Network	
1998	Water Rats	Nine Network	
1999	Blue Heelers‡	Seven Network	
1999	All Saints	Seven Network	
1999	Home and Away	Seven Network	
1999	Water Rats	Nine Network	
2000	Blue Heelers‡	Seven Network	
2000	All Saints	Seven Network	
2000	Home and Away	Seven Network	
2000	SeaChange	ABC	
2001	All Saints‡	Seven Network	
2001	Blue Heelers	Seven Network	
2001	Home and Away	Seven Network	
2001	SeaChange	ABC	
2002	All Saints‡	Seven Network	
2002	Blue Heelers	Seven Network	
2002	Home and Away	Seven Network	
2002	McLeod's Daughters	Nine Network	
2002	The Secret Life of Us	Network Ten	
2003	All Saints‡	Seven Network	
2003	Blue Heelers	Seven Network	
2003	Home and Away	Seven Network	
2003	McLeod's Daughters	Nine Network	
2003	The Secret Life of Us	Network Ten	
2004	McLeod's Daughters‡	Nine Network	
2004	All Saints	Seven Network	
2004	Australian Idol	Network Ten	
2004	Blue Heelers	Seven Network	
2004	Home and Away	Seven Network	
2004	Neighbours	Network Ten	
2004	Rove	Network Ten	

== States ==
Key	Meaning
‡	Indicates the winning program

=== New South Wales ===
Year	Program	Network	Ref
1961	The Bobby Limb Show‡	Nine Network	
1962	Johnny O'Keefe Show‡	Seven Network	
1963	Startime‡	Seven Network	
1964	Tonight with Dave Allen‡	Nine Network	
1965	Tonight‡	Nine Network	
1968	Tonight with Don Lane‡	Nine Network	
1969	Tonight with Don Lane‡	Nine Network	
1970	Tonight Show with Don Lane‡	Nine Network	
1971	The Bob Rogers Show‡	Seven Network	
1972	The Bob Rogers Show‡	Seven Network	
1973	Great Temptation‡	Seven Network	
1974	The Don Lane Show‡	Nine Network	
1975	The Mike Walsh Show‡	Network Ten	
1976	The Mike Walsh Show‡	Network Ten	
1977	The Mike Walsh Show‡	Nine Network/Network Ten	
1978	The Mike Walsh Show‡	Nine Network	
1979	The Mike Walsh Show‡	Nine Network	
1980	The Mike Walsh Show‡	Nine Network	
1981	The Mike Walsh Show‡	Nine Network	
1982	The Mike Walsh Show‡	Nine Network	
1983	The Mike Walsh Show‡	Seven Network	
1984	A Country Practice‡	Seven Network	
1985	A Country Practice‡	Seven Network	
1986	A Country Practice‡	Seven Network	
1987	A Country Practice‡	Seven Network	
1988	A Country Practice‡	Seven Network	
1989	A Country Practice‡	Seven Network	
1990	Home and Away‡	Seven Network	
1991	Home and Away‡	Seven Network	
1992	Home and Away‡	Seven Network	

=== Queensland ===
Year	Program	Network	Ref
1961	The Late Show‡	Seven Network	
1962	Theatre Royal‡	Seven Network	
1963	Theatre Royal‡	Seven Network	
1964	Theatre Royal‡	Seven Network	
1965	Theatre Royal‡	Nine Network	
1968	I've Got a Secret‡	Nine Network	
1969	I've Got a Secret‡	Nine Network	
1970	Dick McCann Show‡	Network Ten	
1971	I've Got a Secret‡	Nine Network	
1972	I've Got a Secret‡	Nine Network	
1973	I've Got a Secret‡	Nine Network	
1974	Studio 9‡	Nine Network	
1975	Studio 9‡	Nine Network	
1976	Studio 9‡	Nine Network	
1977	Studio 9‡	Nine Network	
1978	Country Homestead‡	Nine Network	
1979	Country Homestead‡	Nine Network	
1980	Today Tonight‡	Nine Network	
1981	Today Tonight‡	Nine Network	
1982	Today Tonight‡	Nine Network	
1983	Today Tonight‡	Nine Network	
1984	State Affair‡	Seven Network	
1985	Wombat‡	Seven Network	
1986	State Affair‡	Seven Network	
1987	State Affair‡	Seven Network	
1988	Wombat‡	Seven Network	
1989	Wombat‡	Seven Network	
1990	Wombat‡	Seven Network	
1991	Family Feud‡	Seven Network	
1992	Family Feud‡	Seven Network	

=== South Australia ===
Year	Program	Network	Ref
1961	Adelaide Tonight‡	Nine Network	
1962	On the Sunnyside‡	Seven Network	
1963	Adelaide Tonight‡	Nine Network	
1964	Country and Western Hour‡	Nine Network	
1965	Country and Western Hour‡	Nine Network	
1968	Adelaide Tonight‡	Nine Network	
1969	Adelaide Tonight‡	Nine Network	
1970	Adelaide Tonight‡	Nine Network	
1971	Adelaide Tonight‡	Nine Network	
1972	Adelaide Tonight‡	Nine Network	
1973	Adelaide Tonight‡	Nine Network	
1974	Adelaide Tonight‡	Nine Network	
1975	The Penthouse Club‡	Seven Network	
1976	Sound Unlimited‡	Seven Network	
1977	Pam and Steve's Super Fun Show‡	Seven Network	
1978	Super Fun Show‡	Seven Network	
1979	The Ernie Sigley Show‡	Nine Network	
1980	Music Express‡	Seven Network	
1981	Clapperboard‡	Nine Network	
1982	State Affair‡	Seven Network	
1983	State Affair‡	Seven Network	
1984	State Affair‡	Seven Network	
1985	State Affair‡	Seven Network	
1986	State Affair‡	Seven Network	
1987	State Affair‡	Seven Network	
1988	State Affair‡	Seven Network	
1989	Wheel of Fortune‡	Seven Network	
1990	Wheel of Fortune‡	Seven Network	
1991	Wheel of Fortune‡	Seven Network	
1992	Wheel of Fortune‡	Seven Network	

=== Tasmania ===
Year	Program	Network	Ref
1968	Line-Up‡	ABC	
1969	Line-Up‡	ABC	
1970	It's Just For Us‡		
1971	The Tonight Show‡		
1972	Smith's Weekly‡		
1973	Smith's Weekly‡		
1974	This Week‡		
1975	This Week‡		
1976	This Week‡		
1977	This Week‡		
1978	This Week‡		
1979	Saturday Night Show‡	Nine Network	
1980	People, Places, Politics‡		
1981	Tasmanian New Faces‡	Nine Network	
1982	People, Places, Politics‡		
1983	TVT Documentaries‡		
1984	Taylor's Tasmania‡		
1985	Midweek‡		
1986	Midweek‡		
1987	Midweek‡		
1988	Taylor's Tasmania‡		
1989	KTV‡		
1990	Taylor's Australia‡	Seven Network	
1991	Tasmania Today‡		
1992	Tasmania Today‡		

=== Victoria ===
Year	Program	Network	Ref
1961	In Melbourne Tonight‡	Nine Network	
1962	Sunnyside Up‡	Seven Network	
1963	In Melbourne Tonight‡	Nine Network	
1964	Noel Ferrier's I.M.T‡	Nine Network	
1965	In Melbourne Tonight‡	Nine Network	
1968	In Melbourne Tonight‡	Nine Network	
1969	In Melbourne Tonight‡	Nine Network	
1970	In Melbourne Tonight‡	Nine Network	
1971	The Weekend Starts Here‡	Nine Network	
1972	The Penthouse Club‡	Seven Network	
1973	The Graham Kennedy Show‡	Nine Network	
1974	The Graham Kennedy Show‡	Nine Network	
1975	The Ernie Sigley Show‡	Nine Network	
1976	The Ernie Sigley Show‡	Nine Network	
1977	The Don Lane Show‡	Nine Network	
1978	The Don Lane Show‡	Nine Network	
1979	The Don Lane Show‡	Nine Network	
1980	The Don Lane Show‡	Nine Network	
1981	Prisoner‡	Network Ten	
1982	Cop Shop‡	Seven Network	
1983	Cop Shop‡	Seven Network	
1984	Carson's Law‡	Network Ten	
1985	Prisoner‡	Network Ten	
1986	Neighbours‡	Seven Network	
1987	Neighbours‡	Network Ten	
1988	Neighbours‡	Network Ten	
1989	Neighbours‡	Network Ten	
1990	Neighbours‡	Network Ten	
1991	Neighbours‡	Network Ten	
1992	Neighbours‡	Network Ten	

=== Western Australia ===
Year	Program	Network	Ref
1970	Today Tonight‡	ABC	
1971	Spotlight‡	Nine Network	
1972	Stars of the Future‡	Seven Network	
1973	Anything Goes‡	Seven Network	
1974	Stars of the Future‡	Seven Network	
1975	Stars of the Future‡	Seven Network	
1976	Stars of the Future‡	Seven Network	
1977	Hey Jude‡	Seven Network	
1978	Channel Nine News‡	Nine Network	
1979	Channel Seven News‡	Seven Network	
1980	Terry Willesee's Perth‡	Nine Network	
1981	Terry Willesee's Perth‡	Nine Network	
1982	$50,000 Letterbox‡	Seven Network	
1983	Turpie Tonight‡	Seven Network	
1984	Channel Nine News‡	Nine Network	
1985	State Affair‡	Seven Network	
1986	State Affair‡	Seven Network	
1987	State Affair‡	Seven Network	
1988	State Affair‡	Seven Network	
1989	State Affair‡	Seven Network	
1990	Seven News‡	Seven Network	
1991	Seven News‡	Seven Network	
1992	Seven News‡	Seven Network	
