= George Wallace Memorial Logie for Best New Talent =

Annual Australian television awards

- Country: Australia
- Presented by: TV Week
- First award: 1969
- Final award: 1977
- Website: www.tvweeklogieawards.com.au

Best New Talent in Australia
- Country: Australia
- Presented by: TV Week
- First award: 1978
- Final award: 1979
- Website: www.tvweeklogieawards.com.au

The George Wallace Memorial Logie for Best New Talent was an award presented annually at the Australian TV Week Logie Awards. The award recognised a new talent in an Australian program.

It was first awarded at the 11th Annual TV Week Logie Awards, held in 1969, the year after the death of Logie Award-winning George Wallace Jnr.

== Winners ==
Year	Winner	Program(s)	Network	Ref
	George Wallace Memorial Logie for Best New Talent			
1969	Gerard Kennedy	Hunter	Nine Network	
1970	Jeff Phillips	Sounds Like Us	ABC TV	
1971	Liv Maessen			
1972	Jamie Redfern	Young Talent Time	Network 10	
1973	Paul Hogan	The Paul Hogan Show	Seven Network	
1974	Elizabeth Alexander	Seven Little Australians	ABC TV	
1975	John Waters	Rush	ABC TV	
1976	Norman Gunston	The Norman Gunston Show	ABC TV	
1977	Mark Holden			
	Best New Talent in Australia (Best New Television Talent)			
1978	Brandon Burke	Glenview High	Seven Network	
1979	Jon English	Against the Wind	Seven Network	
	from 1980 see Logie Award for Most Popular New Talent			

== See also ==
- Graham Kennedy Award for Most Outstanding Newcomer
- Logie Award for Most Popular New Male Talent
- Logie Award for Most Popular New Female Talent
- Logie Award for Most Popular New Talent
