= Logie Award for Most Outstanding Sports Coverage =

Annual award

- Country: Australia
- Presented by: TV Week
- First award: 1977
- Website: www.nowtolove.com.au/tv-week-logies

The Silver Logie for Most Outstanding Sports Coverage is an award presented annually at the Australian TV Week Logie Awards. The award is given to recognise outstanding coverage of sports.

The first award for sports coverage was awarded at the 19th Annual TV Week Logie Awards ceremony, held in 1977 as Best Sporting Documentary. In 1978, the award became Outstanding Coverage Of A Sporting Event. From 1981 it became Best Sports Coverage and in 1985 Best Coverage of Sport.

Logie Awards chosen by the public began in 1998, which included the Most Popular Sports Program until 2017.

SBS TV's The World Game won at least three Logies for coverage of the FIFA World Cup Les Murray and Craig Foster collected the TV Week Logie Award for Outstanding Sports Coverage in 2015, for their coverage on SBS TV's The World Game of the 2014 World Cup.

== Winners and nominees ==
| Key | Meaning |
|---|---|
| ‡ | Indicates the winning program |

=== Best Sporting Documentary ===
| Year | Program | Network | Ref |
|---|---|---|---|
| 1977 | Sportsnight‡ | ABC | |

=== Outstanding Coverage Of A Sporting Event ===
| Year | Program | Network | Ref |
|---|---|---|---|
| 1978 | The Australian Open Golf‡ | Nine Network | |
| 1979 | Bathurst Hardie Ferodo motor race‡ | Seven Network | |

=== Outstanding Coverage of a Sports Report ===
| Year | Program | Network | Ref |
|---|---|---|---|
| 1980 | Test cricket‡ | Nine Network | |

=== Best Sports Coverage ===
| Year | Program | Network | Ref |
|---|---|---|---|
| 1981 | The 1980 Moscow Olympic Games‡ | Seven Network | |
| 1982 | Cricket‡ | Nine Network | |
| 1983 | Commonwealth Games‡ | ABC | |
| 1984 | Cricket‡ | Nine Network | |
| 1985 | James Hardie 1000‡ | Seven Network | |
| 1986 | Australian Grand Prix‡ | Nine Network | |

=== Most Outstanding Achievement in Sports ===
| Year | Program | Network | Ref |
|---|---|---|---|
| 1998 | Australia vs Iran World Cup Qualifier‡ | SBS | |
| 1998 | Bathurst 1000 | Network Ten | |
| 1998 | 1997 AFL Grand Final | Seven Network | |

=== Most Outstanding Achievement in Sports ===
| Year | Program | Network | Ref |
|---|---|---|---|
| 1999 | 1998 Commonwealth Games‡ | Nine Network | |
| 1999 | 1998 Melbourne Cup Carnival | Network Ten | |
| 1999 | 1998 World Cup | SBS | |
| 1999 | 1998 Swimming Championships | Nine Network | |

=== Most Outstanding Sports Coverage ===
| Year | Program | Network | Ref |
|---|---|---|---|
| 2000 | FAI 1000 Bathurst‡ | Network Ten | |
| 2000 | 1999 Pan Pacific Swimming‡ | Nine Network | |
| 2000 | Melbourne Cup Carnival | Network Ten | |
| 2000 | 1999 Rugby World Cup | Seven Network | |
| 2001 | The Games of the XXVII Olympiad‡ | Seven Network | |
| 2001 | FAI 1000 Bathurst | Network Ten | |
| 2001 | Melbourne Cup Carnival | Network Ten | |
| 2001 | Nine's Summer of Cricket | Nine Network | |
| 2002 | Bledisloe Cup‡ | Seven Network | |
| 2002 | Bathurst V8 1000 | Network Ten | |
| 2002 | Honda Indy 300 | Network Ten | |
| 2002 | Wimbledon Coverage 2001 | Nine Network | |
| 2002 | World Swimming Championships, Japan | Nine Network | |
| 2003 | Ashes Test Series 2002-03‡ | Nine Network | |
| 2003 | Australian Formula One Grand Prix | Network Ten | |
| 2003 | FIFA World Cup 2002 | SBS/Nine Network | |
| 2003 | The XIX Winter Olympic Games – Salt Lake City | Seven Network | |
| 2003 | The XVII Commonwealth Games – Manchester | Seven Network | |
| 2003 | Bob Jane T-Mart 1000‡ | Network Ten | |
| 2003 | AFL: Friday Night Football | Nine Network | |
| 2003 | Foster's Australian Grand Prix | Network Ten | |
| 2003 | Nine's Summer of Test Cricket | Nine Network | |
| 2003 | Rugby League State of Origin | Nine Network | |
| 2003 | Rugby World Cup | Seven Network | |
| 2005 | Bob Jane T-Mart 1000‡ | Network Ten | |
| 2005 | AFL Grand Final | Network Ten | |
| 2005 | Athens Olympic Games | Seven Network | |
| 2005 | The Melbourne Cup | Seven Network | |
| 2005 | NRL State of Origin 2: Qld vs NSW | Nine Network | |
| 2006 | Super Cheap Auto 1000‡ | Network Ten | |
| 2006 | AFL Grand Final | Network Ten | |
| 2006 | Australian Tennis Open | Seven Network | |
| 2006 | Emirates Melbourne Cup Day | Seven Network | |
| 2006 | Lexmark Indy 300 | Network Ten | |
| 2007 | 2006 FIFA World Cup Germany – Italy vs Australia‡ | SBS | |
| 2007 | 3 Mobile Ashes Series, Second Test | Nine Network | |
| 2007 | 2006 Australian Tennis Open | Seven Network | |
| 2007 | 2006 Winter Olympics | Seven Network | |
| 2007 | 2006 Supercheap Auto Bathurst 1000 | Network Ten | |
| 2008 | Supercheap Auto Bathurst 1000‡ | Seven Network | |
| 2008 | AFL Grand Final | Network Ten | |
| 2008 | 3 Mobile Ashes Series, Fifth Test | Nine Network | |
| 2008 | Australian Open Tennis Championships | Seven Network | |
| 2008 | FINA World Swimming Championships | Nine Network | |
| 2009 | Beijing Olympics‡ | Seven Network | |
| 2009 | AFL Grand Final | Seven Network | |
| 2009 | Beijing Paralympics | ABC | |
| 2009 | Supercheap Auto Bathurst 1000 | Seven Network | |
| 2009 | Tour de France | SBS | |
| 2010 | Supercheap Auto Bathurst 1000‡ | Seven Network | |
| 2010 | 2009 AFL Grand Final | Network Ten | |
| 2010 | 2009 Australian Golf Open | ABC | |
| 2010 | 2009 NRL Grand Final | Nine Network | |
| 2010 | Emirates Melbourne Cup Carnival | Seven Network | |
| 2011 | The Ashes 2010 First Test – Day One at the Gabba‡ | Nine Network | |
| 2011 | 2010 AFL Grand Final | Seven Network | |
| 2011 | 2010 Melbourne Cup | Seven Network | |
| 2011 | Rugby League – 2010 State of Origin – Game One | Nine Network | |
| 2011 | XIX Commonwealth Games 2010 Delhi | Foxtel | |
| 2012 | 2011 State Of Origin – Game Three‡ | Nine Network | |
| 2012 | 2011 Australian Open Tennis | Seven Network | |
| 2012 | 2011 Bathurst 1000 | Seven Network | |
| 2012 | 2011 Melbourne Cup Carnival | Seven Network | |
| 2012 | 2011 Tour de France | SBS | |
| 2013 | London 2012 Olympic Games‡ | Foxtel | |
| 2013 | 2012 Emirates Melbourne Cup Carnival | Seven Network | |
| 2013 | London 2012 Olympic Games | Nine Network | |
| 2013 | 2012 Toyota AFL Grand Final | Seven Network | |
| 2013 | Boxing Day Test Match | Nine Network | |
| 2014 | 2013 Emirates Melbourne Cup Carnival‡ | Seven Network | |
| 2014 | 2013 NRL Grand Final | Nine Network | |
| 2014 | 2013 Toyota AFL Grand Final | Seven Network | |
| 2014 | The Ashes Cricket — Australia v England | Nine Network | |
| 2014 | Tour de France | SBS | |
| 2015 | 2014 FIFA World Cup‡ | SBS | |
| 2015 | 2014 Emirates Melbourne Cup Carnival | Seven Network | |
| 2015 | KFC T20 Big Bash League | Network Ten | |
| 2015 | Supercheap Auto Bathurst 1000 | Seven Network | |
| 2015 | 2014 Toyota AFL Grand Final | Seven Network | |
| 2016 | KFC T20 Big Bash League‡ | Network Ten | |
| 2016 | 2015 Australian Open | Seven Network/7TWO | |
| 2016 | Emirates Melbourne Cup Carnival | Seven Network | |
| 2016 | Holden State of Origin II | Nine Network | |
| 2016 | NRL Telstra Premiership Grand Final | Nine Network | |
| 2017 | Rio 2016 Olympic Games‡ | Seven Network | |
| 2017 | 2016 NRL Grand Final | Nine Network | |
| 2017 | 2016 Supercars Supercheap Auto Bathurst 1000 | Network Ten | |
| 2017 | 2016 AFL Grand Final | Seven Network | |
| 2017 | KFC Big Bash League | Network Ten | |
| 2018 | 2017 Bathurst 1000‡ | Network Ten | |
| 2018 | 2017 AFL Grand Final | Seven Network | |
| 2018 | 2017 Australian Open Men's Final | Seven Network | |
| 2018 | Jeff Horn vs Manny Pacquiao | Foxtel | |
| 2018 | The 2017/2018 Ashes | Nine Network | |
| 2019 | 2018 FIFA World Cup‡ | SBS | |
| 2019 | Australia Vs India: Second Test In Perth | Foxtel | |
| 2019 | 2018 Commonwealth Games | Seven Network | |
| 2019 | 2018 Invictus Games | ABC | |
| 2019 | Supercars Championship: Bathurst | Network Ten | |
| 2022 | Olympic and Paralympics Games Tokyo 2020‡ | Seven Network | |
| 2022 | 2021 AFL Grand Final | Seven Network | |
| 2022 | 2021/2022 Fox Cricket Ashes Coverage | Foxtel | |
| 2022 | 2022 Australian Open Women's Final | Nine Network | |
| 2022 | State of Origin – Game 1 | Nine Network | |
| 2023 | State of Origin‡ | Nine Network | |
| 2023 | 2022 AFL Grand Final | Seven Network | |
| 2023 | 2022 FIFA World Cup | SBS | |
| 2023 | 2022 Melbourne Cup Carnival | Network Ten | |
| 2023 | 2023 Australian Open | Nine Network | |
| 2023 | Birmingham 2022 Commonwealth Games | Seven Network | |
