= Reg Lindsay =

Reg Lindsay OAM
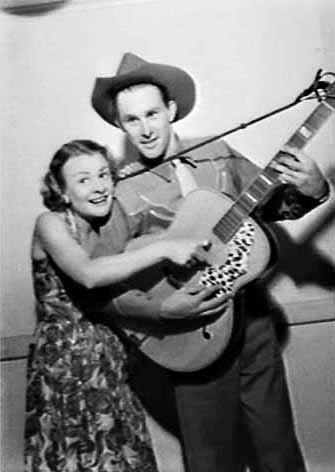
- Lindsay (right), Joan Clarke; 2UW Radio Theatre, Sydney, November 1954

Background information
- Born: Reginald John Lindsay; 7 July 1929; Waverley, New South Wales, Australia
- Died: 5 August 2008 (aged 79) Newcastle, New South Wales, Australia
- Genre: Australian country
- Occupations: Singer; songwriter; musician; producer; radio and TV presenter
- Instruments: Vocals; acoustic guitar
- Years active: 1951–2008
- Labels: Rodeo; Festival; Con Brio
- Spouses: Heather McKean (m. 1954; sep. 1982) Roslyn Winfield (m. 1988)
- Website: reglindsay.com.au

Reginald John Lindsay OAM (7 July 1929 – 5 August 2008) was an Australian country music singer, songwriter, multi-instrumentalist, producer and radio and television personality. He won three Golden Guitar Awards and wrote more than 500 songs in his 50-year music career. Lindsay recorded over 65 albums and 250 singles. Reg made his first trip to Nashville in June 1968 and recorded his first Nashville EP on this historic trip.

Lindsay's most popular cross-over hit was a cover version, "Armstrong" (March 1971), which reached No. 6 on the Go-Set National Top 60. It was written and originally performed by the American folk musician John Stewart as a tribute to Neil Armstrong's lunar landing in 1969.

== Early years ==
Lindsay was born in Waverley, New South Wales in 1929, his parents were Jim and Ellen Lindsay. He was two years of age when his father gave him a harmonica which he quickly mastered. His father taught him to play, "The Wheel on the Wagon Is Broke", on harmonica by the age of four.

He subsequently learned the banjo, mandolin, guitar and fiddle. After Sydney he grew up in Parkes and then Adelaide. His aunt Anne gave him a guitar when he was 15.

After leaving school (Adelaide, South Australia) he initially worked for the Department of Agriculture and studied wool classing. As a teenager his career ambition was to become a stockman and learned how to shear sheep. Later he reflected, "The outback has always been romantic to me. People of that ilk have always been romantic. We have the longest cattle drives in the world, you know. I was scheduled to go into a reservation in the north-west of South Australia, but I ended up as a jackeroo in Broken Hill instead."

Around 1946 Reg started singing around the Adelaide area with a mate Dave Burchell. As a 'Hillbilly' duo, they entertained over radio, swimming carnivals, and other events in the area. In 1948 Reg and Dave auditioned for the Dick Fair hosted radio contest program Australia's Amateur Hour. They had also recorded a couple songs which were never released.

After he twisted his leg in a rodeo accident, he recuperated at his parents' home in Adelaide for several weeks in 1950. He was listening to country music on 2SM with Tim McNamara promoting a radio talent quest. In November 1950 Lindsay travelled to Sydney via a motorcycle to compete, in the following year, which launched his career as a singer-songwriter.

== Radio shows and recording ==
Reg Lindsay was a performer in the 2KY radio show, On the Melody Trail, from September 1951, alongside, "Joy McKean and Heather McKean, Australia's Melody Cowgirls, Slim Dusty, Gordon Parsons and other hillbilly artists." The McKean Sisters were a country music duo of Joy McKean and her younger sister Heather, who had presented the show since 1949. Heather married Reg Lindsay in February 1954, while Joy had married Slim Dusty in 1951.

Lindsay was signed to Rodeo Records in 1951, which issued his early material. His singles with that label include, "Blue Velvet Band", "My Home Way Out Back" (written by Lindsay), "Sundowner Yodel", "If You've Got the Money, I've Got the Time", "By the Old Slip Rail", "Sweeter than Flowers", "Shackles and Chains", "My Blue-Eyed Jane" (all before 1955), "I Love You a Thousand Ways", "Country Mile", "I'll Never Live It Down", Got Those Itchy Feet", "In the Luggage Van Ahead" (all five in 1954). Radio station 2CH had him present, The Reg Lindsay Show, in 1951 to showcase his own country music. Late in that year he and his show moved over to rival station, 2SM, where it continued for 12 years.

His singles from the late 1950s on Columbia Records include, "Tom Dooley", "The Walkabout Rock and Roll" (both 1958), "The Ghost of Tom Dooley", "Don't Steal Daddy's Medal", "The Wog", "Where No One Stands Alone" (both 1959), "The Caribbean" and "The House Down Willow Lane". AllMusic's Jason Ankeny observed, "despite his public recognition and relentless touring schedule, success as a performer continued to elude him."

== Touring ==
Reg Lindsay's first tour came about in January 1955 when he was chosen as the headliner for the Wilf Carter tour. About two weeks in the tour Wilf Carter fell ill and had to return to the US, and Reg continued the tour as 'The Reg Lindsay Show'. Reg Lindsay continued issuing singles and presenting a radio show into the early 1960s. He also headed a touring line-up for The Reg Lindsay Show, which in February 1960 included Heather, "Kevin King, Jacqueline Hall, Nev Nicholls, Hayseeds, Fred Maugher and comedian George Nichols."

== Television programs ==
Lindsay returned to Australia in 1964, and hosted a TV show on the Nine Network in Adelaide called The Country and Western Hour, which ran for seven-and-a-half years, until 1972. It won two state-based Logie Awards for South Australia's Most Popular show in 1964 and 1965. By 1966 the show that was originally only broadcast locally in Adelaide went nationally with Lindsay, as host In that year he issued a single, "They Gotta Quit Kickin' My Dog Around". He travelled to the United States in 1968, to record material for his TV show, while there he was asked to appear on the Grand Ole Opry in Nashville. He was so successful in this debut he was invited back for the ultimate encore, the Saturday night show. Reg was the first Australian ever to do so and was the first of many Grand Ole Opry appearances.<

== Business ventures ==
Upon return to Sydney in 1968, with his wife Heather, he established a business, Reg Lindsay's Country Store, to sell "records, clothing and musical instruments." Heather described, "It's surprising how many of the young people like to wear this gear-particularly the hand-carved leatherwork. The young surfies like the fringed jackets-they're fantastic sellers-and the girls go for the cotton jackets to wear over bathers to the beach." A second store soon followed, both were sold off ten years later.

== Later career ==
Lindsay was best known for his single, "Armstrong" (March 1971), a tribute to the historic 1969 Moon landing by American astronauts, particularly Neil Armstrong. It peaked at No. 6 on the Go-Set National Top 60 and remained in the charts for 16 weeks. It is included in a time capsule at the Johnson Space Center in Houston, Texas. The song is written and was recorded by John Stewart, an ex-member of the Kingston Trio. It is Lindsay's first major hit, reaching No. 8 on the Australian Singles Chart in 1971.

His other popular singles from the 1970s are "July You're a Woman" (1973), "Silence on the Line" (1977) and "Empty Arms Hotel" 1979). In January 1974 he won a Golden Guitar trophy at the Country Music Awards of Australia for Best Male Vocal with "July You're a Woman". He won the same category in 1978 for "Silence on the Line". A third trophy for "Empty Arms Hotel" was awarded in that category in 1980.

The Country and Western Hour had finished in 1972 and was followed in late 1977 by his own TV program, Reg Lindsay's Country Homestead, on Brisbane's Channel 9, which ran for four years until 1982. Reg Lindsay's Country Homestead also won two state-based Logie Awards for Queensland's Most Popular Show in 1978 and 1979.

Lindsay supported charities and appeared on TV telethons to raise money for various community organizations. Some of his performances were issued on a DVD video album, Reg Lindsay – live across Australia 1979–1994, in 2015 via Umbrella Entertainment. In a music career of over 50 years he wrote more than 500 songs and hosted various TV shows. He recorded over 65 albums and 250 singles.

== Personal life ==
Lindsay was married twice. His first marriage was to Heather McKean (born 1932) on 13 February 1954 in Granville. McKean's older sister Joy McKean had married fellow country musician, Slim Dusty in 1951; that couple are the parents of another country musician, Anne Kirkpatrick. The McKean Sisters were a country music duo from 1948. Heather continued performing under her maiden name during their marriage. In May 1969 Lindsay and Heather opened Reg Lindsay's Country Store and Trading Post to sell Western gear. They separated in 1982 and Heather resumed her solo career as well as working with Joy as the McKean Sisters.

Reg married his second wife, Roslyn née Winfield (born 1959), a rodeo champion, on October 12, 1988 at Brampton Island – they first met in 1984 at the Warwick Rodeo, Queensland where the 24 year old was competing in the National Finals. Dave Dawson described Roslyn, "glamorous former barrel racer, steer roper and country chanteuse." His son-in-law, Ross Smith, was one of six victims of Malcolm Baker, a spree killer, in October 1992, the murders are referred to as the Central Coast massacre.

In January 1995 he had a brain hemorrhage and in the following month he underwent surgery to remove the related brain aneurysm. He had a heart attack in January 1996 and had triple bypass surgery. A series of strokes followed, Roslyn observed, "He had lots of seizures, and it was very, very tough for him for many years, trying to get those seizures under control." From 2003 he was under 24-hour care at John Hunter Hospital in Newcastle, New South Wales.

Reg Lindsay died of pneumonia on 5 August 2008 in Newcastle, aged 79. Coincidentally, this date is the birthday of Neil Armstrong. Lindsay is survived by his wife Roslyn; his three daughters from his first marriage, Dianne, Sandra and Joanne; and his grandchildren. His daughter, Dianne Lindsay is also a country music singer-songwriter – she won Best Female Vocal at the Australian Country Music People's Choice Awards in Tamworth in January 2017.

March 2015, the Reg Lindsay statue was unveiled at East Cessnock Bowling Club. In 2019 the first Reg Lindsay DVD was released titled 'Country All The Way' and in January 2021, Roslyn Lindsay released the first ever Reg Lindsay pictorial book 'Setting The Pace' a collection of photos throughout his career with rare photos including McKean Sisters, Slim Dusty, Kenny Sole, Judy Stone, Chad Morgan, Buddy Williams, Lily Connors and many others. The DVD, CDs and Book are available at the Reg Lindsay official website

On 21 January 2021 Roslyn with the Federal Member for New England Barnaby Joyce and selected guests officially opened The Reg Lindsay Memory Barn at Spring Ridge, south of Tamworth, in honor of her late husband. The Reg Lindsay Memory Barn, which is full of Reg's personal and career's memorabilia spanning 60 years, was expected to be officially opened in 2020 but was delayed due to the COVID-19 pandemic.

== DVDs and books ==
- Country All the Way DVD (2019)
- Setting the Pace pictorial book (2021)

== Discography ==
=== Albums ===
- Country Music Comes To Town (1961) (with the Noel Gilmour Quarter & The Delltones)
- Country & Western Singalong (1964)
- Another Country and Western Singalong (1966)
- Country and Western Million Sellers (1966)
- T.V. Requests (1967)
- Country Duets from Reg and Heather (1967) (with Heather McKean)
- Australia's Country Music Man (1968)
- Roadside Mail Box (1968)
- On Tour with His Town & Country Show (1968)
- Reg Lindsay Favourites (1969) (with Heather McKean)
- She Taught Me To Yodel (1969)
- Hot Shot Country (1970)
- Armstrong (1971)
- Songs for Country Folk (1971)
- Country and Western Greats (1972)
- Country Music Jamboree (1972)
- 21st Century Album (1973) (2xLP)
- Glory Land Way (1973)
- Reg Lindsay (1973)
- Reg Lindsay's Country Favourites (1975)
- Reg Lindsay in Nashville (1975) (Re-released in 1979 in the US)
- The Travellin' Man (1976)
- Silence on the Line (1977)
- Play Me a Simple Song (1978)
- 20 Golden Country Greats (1979)
- Standing Tall (1979)
- Ten Ten Two and a Quarter (1980)
- If You Could See Me Now (1981)
- "Will The Real Reg Lindsay..." (1982)
- The World of Rodeo (1985)
- I've Always Wanted To Do That (1985)
- Lifetime of Country Music (1987)
- The Best of Reg Lindsay (1992)
- Reasons to Rise (1993)
- No Slowin' Down (1994)
- Down By The Old Slip Rail (1997)

=== Charting singles ===
Year	Title	Peak chart positions	
Year	Title	AUS Go-Set	AUS KMR
1966	"They Gotta Quit Kickin' My Dog Around"	—	90
1971	"Armstrong"	6	8
1973	"Close the Door Lightly"	—	98
1973	"July You're a Woman"	—	86
1975	"Takin' a Chance"	—	95
1976	"Give Me Liberty"	—	91
"—" denotes a recording that did not chart or was not released in that territory.

== Awards and honours ==
Reg Lindsay became the first Australian to appear at Nashville's Grand Ole Opry in June 1968; he is officially recognized with a plaque on Nashville's Walkway of Stars.

- 1968 - Was made an Honorary Citizen of Tennessee by Governor Buford Ellington
- 1968 - Honored by CMA for his contribution to Country Music worldwide (Nashville)
- 1973 (Oct) CMA citation for his contribution to Country Music (Nashville)
- 1978 (June) National Academy of Recording Arts & Sciences, Nashville - for Services Rendered
- 1981 - Named "Australian Pro-Rodeo's Favorite and made an honorary member of the Rodeo Association
- 1982 - Queensland Country Music Awards
- 1986 - Was made an Honorary Citizen of Texas
- 1988 - Inducted into the Barmera Country Music Hall of Fame
- 1989 - OAM for his Services to Country Music
- 2006 - Living Legends Award (Kempsey, NSW)

=== Country Music Awards (CMAA) ===
Reg Lindsay has won three Golden guitar awards and was inducted into the Roll of Renown at the Tamworth Country Music Awards of Australia

Year	Nominee / work	Award	Result
1974	Reg Lindsay July You're a Woman	Male Vocalist of the Year	Won
1978	Reg Lindsay Silence on the Line	Male Vocalist of the Year	Won
1980	Reg Lindsay The Empty Arms Hotel	Male Vocalist of the Year	Won
1984	Reg Lindsay	Roll of Renown	inducted

=== Mo Awards ===
The Australian Entertainment Mo Awards (commonly known informally as the Mo Awards), were annual Australian entertainment industry awards. They recognise achievements in live entertainment in Australia from 1975 to 2016. Lindsay won two awards in that time.

Year	Nominee / work	Award	Result (wins only)
2001	Reg Lindsay	John Campbell Fellowship Award	Won
2014	Reg Lindsay	Hall of Fame	inducted

=== Order of Australia ===
Year	Nominee / work	Award	Result
1989	Queen's Birthday Honours (Australia)	Member of the Order of Australia (AM) "for service to country music"	Won
