= Logie Awards of 1987 =

Australian television awards

29th Logie Awards
- Date: 3 April 1987
- Site: Hyatt on Collins, Melbourne, Victoria
- Hosted by: Don Lane

Highlights
- Gold Logie: Ray Martin
- Hall of Fame: Paul Hogan
- Most awards: Neighbours (5)

Television coverage
- Network: Network Ten

The 29th Annual TV Week Logie Awards was held on Friday 3 April 1987 at the Hyatt on Collins in Melbourne, and broadcast on Network Ten. The ceremony was hosted by Don Lane and guests included Lee Majors, Brian Dennehy, Loretta Swit, Harry Hamlin, Laura Johnson, Leeza Gibbons, Dame Edna Everage and Nicole Kidman.

== Nominees and winners ==
Winners are listed first and highlighted in bold. The nominations for the public voting categories and national awards were published in the 4 April 1987 issue of TV Week.

=== National awards ===
==== Gold Logie ====
Most Popular Personality on Australian Television
- **Ray Martin** for **The Midday Show (Nine Network)**
  - Greg Evans for Perfect Match (Network Ten)
  - Daryl Somers for Hey Hey It's Saturday (Nine Network)

==== Acting ====
Most Popular Australian Actor	Most Popular Australian Actress
**Peter O'Brien** for **Neighbours (Network Ten)**; Andrew Clarke for Sword of Honour (Seven Network); Jason Donovan for Neighbours (Network Ten)	**Kylie Minogue** for **Neighbours (Network Ten)**; Tracy Mann for Sword of Honour (Seven Network); Elaine Smith for Neighbours (Network Ten)
Most Popular Actor in a Single Drama or Miniseries	Most Popular Actress in a Single Drama or Miniseries
**Andrew Clarke** for **Sword of Honour (Seven Network)**; Jack Thompson for The Last Frontier (Network Ten)	**Tracy Mann** for **Sword of Honour (Seven Network)**; Lorraine Bayly for The Challenge (Seven Network)
Most Popular New Talent in Australia
**Jason Donovan** for **Neighbours (Network Ten)**; Cameron Daddo for Perfect Match (Network Ten); Kylie Minogue for Neighbours (Network Ten)

==== Most Popular Programs/Videos ====
Most Popular Australian Drama Series	Most Popular Light Entertainment Program
**Neighbours** **(Network Ten)**; A Country Practice (Seven Network)	**Hey Hey It's Saturday** **(Nine Network)**; Perfect Match (Network Ten)
Most Popular Public Affairs Program	Most Popular Single Drama or Miniseries
**60 Minutes** **(Nine Network)**	**Sword of Honour** **(Seven Network)**; The Challenge (Seven Network); The Last Frontier (Network Ten)
Most Popular Sports Coverage	Most Popular Children's Program
**Wide World of Sports** **(Nine Network)**; Australian Grand Prix (Nine Network)	**Wombat** **(Seven Network)**; Simon Townsend's Wonder World (Network Ten)
Most Popular Australian Music Video
"**You're the Voice**" by **John Farnham**

==== Most Outstanding Programs ====
Most Outstanding Single Documentary or Documentary Series	Most Outstanding Achievement in News
**Handle with Care** **(Network Ten)** and **The Greatest Gift** **(Nine Network)** – Tied	"**Russell Street Bombing**" **(Network Ten)**
Most Outstanding Achievement in Public Affairs	Most Outstanding Achievement by Regional Television
"**Coup D'Etat**", **ABC News** **(ABC TV)**	**Kids Only** **(BTV-6, Ballarat)**

=== State awards ===
==== New South Wales ====
Most Popular Personality
Winner: Ray Martin (Nine Network)

Most Popular Program
Winner: A Country Practice (Seven Network)

==== Queensland ====
Most Popular Personality
Winner: Jacki MacDonald (Nine Network)

Most Popular Program
Winner: State Affair (Seven Network)

==== South Australia ====
Most Popular Personality
Winner: Anne Wills (Network Ten)

Most Popular Program
Winner: State Affair (Seven Network)

==== Tasmania ====
Most Popular Personality
Winner: Tom Payne (TVT-6)

Most Popular Program
Winner: Midweek (TVT-6)

==== Victoria ====
Most Popular Personality
Winner: Daryl Somers (Nine Network)

Most Popular Program
Winner: Neighbours (Network Ten)

==== Western Australia ====
Most Popular Personality
Winner: Rick Ardon (Seven Network)

Most Popular Program
Winner: State Affair (Seven Network)

== Performers ==
- Don Lane
- Daryl Somers
- Kerri-Anne Kennerley
- Michael Cormack and the Jillian Fitzgerald dancers
- Dame Edna Everage and dancers

== Hall of Fame ==
After a lifetime in the Australian television industry, Paul Hogan became the fourth inductee into the TV Week Logies Hall of Fame.
