= Logie Awards of 1969 =

11th Logie Awards
- Date: 21 March 1969
- Site: Southern Cross Hotel, Melbourne, Victoria
- Hosted by: Bert Newton
- Gold Logie: Graham Kennedy

Television coverage
- Network: Nine Network

The 11th Annual TV Week Logie Awards were presented on Friday 21 March 1969 at Southern Cross Hotel in Melbourne and broadcast on the Nine Network. Bert Newton from the Nine Network was the Master of Ceremonies. American television actors Dennis Cole, Barbara Anderson, William Shatner, Ty Hardin, British actor Barry Morse and Skippy appeared as guests.

== Awards ==
=== National ===
Gold Logie for Most Popular Personality on Australian Television
Winner: Graham Kennedy

Best Drama Show

Winner: Homicide, Seven Network

Best Comedy Show

Winner: I've Married a Bachelor, ABC

Best Teenage Personality

Winner: Johnny Farnham

Best Overseas Show

Winner: Rowan & Martin's Laugh-In

Best Commercial

Winner: Cambridge Cigarettes

Best Documentary

Winner: The Talgai Skull, ABC

Best Variety Show

Winner: Sound of Music, Nine Network

Best Children's Show

Winner: Adventure Island, ABC

Best Export Production

Winner: Skippy The Bush Kangaroo, Nine Network

=== State ===
==== Victoria ====
Best Male Personality

Winner: Michael Preston

Best Female Personality

Winner: Rosemary Margan

Best Show

Winner: In Melbourne Tonight, Nine Network

==== New South Wales ====
Best Male Personality

Winner: Don Lane

Best Female Personality

Winner: Penny Spence

Best Show

Winner: Tonight with Don Lane, Nine Network

==== South Australia ====
Best Male Personality

Winner: Ernie Sigley

Best Female Personality

Winner: Anne Wills

Best Show

Winner: Adelaide Tonight, Nine Network

==== Queensland ====
Best Male Personality

Winner: Dick McCann

Best Female Personality

Winner: Joy Chambers

Best Show

Winner: I've Got a Secret, Nine Network

==== Tasmania ====
Best Male Personality

Winner: Lindsay Edwards

Best Female Personality

Winner: Caroline Schmit

Best Show

Winner: Line-Up, ABC

=== Special Achievement Award ===
George Wallace Memorial Logie for Best New Talent

Winner: Gerard Kennedy, Hunter
