= Logie Awards of 1982 =

24th Logie Awards
- Date: 12 March 1982
- Site: Hilton Hotel, Melbourne, Victoria
- Hosted by: Bert Newton

Highlights
- Gold Logie: Bert Newton
- Most awards: A Town Like Alice (5)

Television coverage
- Network: Nine Network

The 24th Annual TV Week Logie Awards was held on Friday 12 March 1982 at the Hilton Hotel in Melbourne, and broadcast on the Nine Network. The ceremony was hosted by Bert Newton. Guests included Cindy Williams, Ernest Borgnine, Robert Urich, Lou Ferrigno, Britt Ekland, Rod Taylor and Genie Francis. Olivia Newton-John also appeared as a guest performer.

== National Awards ==
=== Gold Logie ===
Most Popular Male Personality on Australian Television
Winner: Bert Newton in The Don Lane Show (Nine Network)

=== Acting/Presenting ===
Most Popular Actor
Winner: Paul Cronin in The Sullivans (Nine Network)

Most Popular Actress
Winner: Val Lehman in Prisoner (Network Ten)

Most Popular New Talent
Winner: Gary Sweet in The Sullivans (Nine Network)

Best Lead Actor in a Series
Winner: John McTernan in Cop Shop (Seven Network)

Best Lead Actress in a Series
Winner: Val Lehman in Prisoner (Network Ten)

Best Supporting Actor in a Series
Winner: Andy Anderson in The Sullivans (Nine Network)

Best Supporting Actress in a Series
Winner: Vikki Hammond in The Sullivans (Nine Network)

Best Lead Actor in a Miniseries or Telemovie
Winner: Bryan Brown in A Town Like Alice (Seven Network)

Best Lead Actress in a Miniseries or Telemovie
Winner: Helen Morse in A Town Like Alice (Seven Network)

Best Supporting Actress in a Miniseries or Telemovie
Winner: Dorothy Alison in A Town Like Alice (Seven Network)

Best Supporting Actor in a Miniseries or Telemovie
Winner: Gordon Jackson in A Town Like Alice (Seven Network)

Best Performance by a Juvenile
Winner: Adam Garnett in I Can Jump Puddles (ABC)

TV Reporter of the Year
Winner: Mike Barrett (Seven Network)

=== Most Popular Programs ===
Most Popular Drama Series
Winner: Prisoner (Network Ten)

Nominees: Cop Shop, The Sullivans

Most Popular Comedy Series
Winner: Kingswood Country (Seven Network)

Most Popular Quiz/Game Show
Winner: Sale of the Century (Nine Network)

Most Popular Variety Show
Winner:

The Mike Walsh Show (Nine Network)

Most Popular Public Affairs Show
Winner:

60 Minutes (Nine Network)

=== Best/Outstanding Programs ===
Best Miniseries or Telemovie
Winner: A Town Like Alice (Seven Network)

Best Children's TV Series
Winner: Humphrey Bear (Nine Network)

Best Documentary Series
Winner: A Matter of Chance (ABC)

Best Single Documentary
Winner: Stepping Out (Seven Network)

Best Sports Coverage
Winner: Cricket (Nine Network)

Best News Report
Winner: "Boy Down Well" (Seven Network)

Outstanding Public Affairs Report
Winner: "Never Say Die" by Ian Leslie, 60 Minutes (Nine Network)

Nominees: Four Corners, Nationwide, Willesee at Seven

Outstanding Regional TV Program
Winner: The Hawk (SEQ-TV, Maryborough)

Special Award for Sustained Excellence
Winner: Young Talent Time (Network Ten)

== State Awards ==
=== New South Wales ===
Most Popular Male
Winner: Mike Walsh (Nine Network)

Most Popular Female
Winner: Katrina Lee (Network Ten)

Most Popular Show
Winner: The Mike Walsh Show (Nine Network)

=== Queensland ===
Most Popular Male
Winner: Earle Bailey (Seven Network)

Most Popular Female
Winner: Jacki MacDonald (Network Ten)

Most Popular Show
Winner: Today Tonight (Nine Network)

=== South Australia ===
Most Popular Male
Winner: Guy Blackmore (Seven Network)

Most Popular Female
Winner: Anne Wills (Network Ten)

Most Popular Show
Winner: State Affair (Seven Network)

=== Tasmania ===
Most Popular Male
Winner: Tom Payne (TVT-6)

Most Popular Female
Winner: Jennifer Jones (TVT-6)

Most Popular Show
Winner: People, Places, Politics (TVT-6)

=== Victoria ===
Most Popular Male
Winner: Bert Newton (Nine Network)

Most Popular Female
Winner: Paula Duncan (Seven Network)

Most Popular Show
Winner: Cop Shop (HSV-7)

=== Western Australia ===
Most Popular Male
Winner: Rick Ardon (Seven Network)

Most Popular Female
Winner: Ann Sanders (Seven Network)

Most Popular Show
Winner: $50,000 Letterbox (Seven Network)
