= Logie Awards of 1971 =

13th Logie Awards
- Date: 26 March 1971
- Site: Southern Cross Hotel, Melbourne, Victoria
- Hosted by: Bert Newton
- Gold Logie: Gerard Kennedy

Television coverage
- Network: Nine Network

The 13th Annual TV Week Logie Awards were presented on Friday 26 March 1971 at Southern Cross Hotel in Melbourne and broadcast on the Nine Network. Bert Newton from the Nine Network was the Master of Ceremonies. American television actors Michael Cole, Peter Haskell, Bob Crane and Karen Jensen appeared as guests. This article lists the winners of Logie Awards (Australian television) for 1970:

== Awards ==
=== Gold Logie ===
Most Popular Male Personality on Australian Television
Winner:

Gerard Kennedy, Division 4, Nine Network

Most Popular Female Personality on Australian Television
Winner:

Maggie Tabberer, Maggie, Seven Network

Special Gold Logie in Recognition of Their Contribution To Australian TV
Winner:

Bob and Dolly Dyer, Pick-A-Box, Seven Network

==== National ====
Best Australian Drama
Winner:

Homicide, Seven Network

Best Actor
Winner:

Gerard Kennedy, Division 4, Nine Network

Best Teenage Personality
Winner:

Johnny Farnham

Best Australian Comedy
Winner:

Noel Ferrier's Australia A-Z

Best Musical/Variety Show
Winner:

Sound of Music, Nine Network

Best Documentary/Current Affairs Series
Winner:

Four Corners, ABC

Best Overseas Show
Winner:

The Mod Squad

Best Commercial
Winner:

Coca-Cola

Best New Australian Drama
Winner:

Dynasty, ABC

For Their Contribution to the Australian Teenager on TV
Winner:

Happening 70, Network Ten

Most Outstanding News Coverage
Winner:

Heinz Voelzer, ABC

Most Outstanding Coverage of Political Affairs
Winner:

This Day Tonight, ABC

Most Outstanding Documentary
Winner:

Scream Bloody Murder, Network Ten

==== Victoria ====
Most Popular Male
Winner:

Jimmy Hannan

Most Popular Female
Winner:

Sue Donovan

Most Popular Show
Winner:

The Weekend Starts Here, Nine Network

==== New South Wales ====
Most Popular Male
Winner:

Barry Crocker

Most Popular Female
Winner:

Maggie Tabberer

Most Popular Show
Winner:

The Bob Rogers Show, Seven Network

==== South Australia ====
Most Popular Male
Winner:

Ernie Sigley

Most Popular Female
Winner:

Anne Wills

Most Popular Show
Winner:

Adelaide Tonight, Nine Network

==== Queensland ====
Most Popular Male
Winner:

Ron Cadee

Most Popular Female
Winner:

Annette Allison

Most Popular Show
Winner:

I've Got A Secret, Nine Network

==== Tasmania ====
Most Popular Male
Winner:

Lindsay Edwards

Most Popular Female
Winner:

Caroline Schmit

Most Popular Show
Winner:

The Tonight Show

==== Western Australia ====
Most Popular Male
Winner:

Garry Meadows

Most Popular Female
Winner:

Trina Brown

Most Popular Show
Winner:

Spotlight, Nine Network

=== Special Achievement Award ===
George Wallace Memorial Award For Best New Talent
Winner:

Liv Maessen
