= Logie Awards of 1986 =

28th Logie Awards
- Date: 18 April 1986
- Site: State Theatre, Sydney, New South Wales
- Hosted by: Michael Willesee

Highlights
- Gold Logie: Daryl Somers
- Hall of Fame: Neil Davis
- Most awards: A Country Practice (4)

Television coverage
- Network: Nine Network

The 28th Annual TV Week Logie Awards was held on Friday 18 April 1986 at the State Theatre in Sydney, and broadcast on the Nine Network. The ceremony was hosted by Michael Willesee and guests included John Denver, Paul Hogan, Veronica Hamel, Phyllis Diller, Gordon Jackson and Sam Neill and Laura Branigan.

== National Awards ==
=== Gold Logie ===
Most Popular Personality on Australian Television
Winner: Daryl Somers in Hey Hey It's Saturday (Nine Network)

=== Acting/Presenting ===
Most Popular Australian Actor
Winner: Grant Dodwell in A Country Practice (Seven Network)

Most Popular Australian Actress
Winner: Anne Tenney in A Country Practice (Seven Network)

Most Popular Australian Actor in a Miniseries or Telemovie
Winner: Andrew Clarke in Anzacs (Nine Network)

Most Popular Australian Actress in a Miniseries or Telemovie
Winner: Megan Williams in Anzacs (Nine Network)

Most Popular New Talent
Winner: Peter O'Brien in Neighbours (Seven Network)

Best Performance by a Juvenile
Winner: Nadine Garner in The Henderson Kids (Network Ten)

TV Reporter of the Year
Winner: Ian Leslie in 60 Minutes (Nine Network)

=== Most Popular Programs/Videos ===
Most Popular Australian Drama
Winner: A Country Practice (Seven Network)

Most Popular Australian Miniseries or Telemovie
Winner: Anzacs (Nine Network)

Most Popular Australian Light Entertainment Program
Winner: Perfect Match (Network Ten)

Most Popular Public Affairs Program
Winner: 60 Minutes (Nine Network)

Most Popular Documentary Series
Winner: Willesee Documentaries (Nine Network)

Most Popular Children's Program
Winner: Simon Townsend's Wonder World (Network Ten)

Most Popular Music Video
Winner: "What You Need" by INXS

=== Best/Outstanding Programs ===
Best Light Entertainment Series
Winner: The Gillies Report (ABC TV)

Best Light Entertainment Special
Winner: Cliff Richard in Concert (Nine Network)

Best Documentary
Winner: Sweat of the Sun, Tears of the Moon (ABC TV)

Best News Report
Winner: "Eagle Farm Siege" (TVQ, Brisbane)

Best Public Affairs Report
Winner: "Tax Summit", Jennifer Byrne, Sunday (Nine Network)

Outstanding Coverage of Sport
Winner: Australian Grand Prix (Nine Network)

Outstanding Contribution by a Regional Station
Winner: Newshour (TV8, Bendigo)

== State Awards ==
=== New South Wales ===
Most Popular Male
Winner: Ray Martin (Nine Network)

Most Popular Female
Winner: Anne Tenney (Seven Network)

Most Popular Program
Winner: A Country Practice (Seven Network)

=== Queensland ===
Most Popular Male
Winner: Glenn Taylor (Seven Network)

Most Popular Female
Winner: Jacki MacDonald (Nine Network)

Most Popular Program
Winner: State Affair (Seven Network)

=== South Australia ===
Most Popular Male
Winner: Keith Conlon (Seven Network)

Most Popular Female
Winner: Anne Wills (Network Ten)

Most Popular Program
Winner: State Affair (Seven Network)

=== Tasmania ===
Most Popular Male
Winner: Tom Payne (TVT-6)

Most Popular Female
Winner: Jenny Roberts (TVT-6)

Most Popular Program
Winner: Midweek (TVT-6)

=== Victoria ===
Most Popular Male
Winner: Daryl Somers (Nine Network)

Most Popular Female
Winner: Delvene Delaney (Nine Network)

Most Popular Program
Winner: Neighbours (Seven Network)

=== Western Australia ===
Most Popular Male
Winner: Rick Ardon (Seven Network)

Most Popular Female
Winner: Susannah Carr (Seven Network)

Most Popular Program
Winner: State Affair (Seven Network)

== Performers ==
- John Farnham and Laura Branigan
- Julie Anthony and John Denver
- Tony Bartuccio dancers
- Max Gillies and Tracy Harvey

== Hall of Fame ==
After a lifetime in the Australian television industry, Neil Davis posthumously became the third inductee into the TV Week Logies Hall of Fame.
