= Logie Awards of 1983 =

25th Logie Awards
- Date: 22 April 1983
- Site: Wentworth Regent Hotel, Melbourne, Victoria
- Hosted by: Michael Willesee

Highlights
- Gold Logie: Daryl Somers
- Most awards: Sons and Daughters (3)

Television coverage
- Network: Network Ten

The 25th Annual TV Week Logie Awards was held on Friday 22 April 1983 at the Wentworth Regent Hotel in Melbourne, and broadcast on Network Ten. The ceremony was hosted by Michael Willesee. Guests included Dennis Waterman, Pamela Stephenson, Gregory Harrison, David Ogden Stiers, Jack Klugman, Mike Farrell, Erin Gray, Chuck Norris, Peter Davison, Priscilla Presley, Gordon Jackson, Shelley Fabares, Kate Jackson, Stephen Collins and Graham Kennedy.

== National Awards ==
=== Gold Logie ===
Most Popular Personality on Australian Television
Winner: Daryl Somers in Hey Hey It's Saturday (Nine Network)

=== Acting/Presenting ===
Most Popular Lead Actor in a Series
Winner: Paul Cronin in The Sullivans (Nine Network)

Most Popular Lead Actress in a Series
Winner: Rowena Wallace in Sons and Daughters (Seven Network)

Most Popular New Talent
Winner: Stephen Comey in Sons and Daughters (Seven Network)

Best Lead Actor in a Series
Winner: John McTernan in Cop Shop (Seven Network)

Best Lead Actress in a Series
Winner: Val Lehman in Prisoner (Network Ten)

Best Supporting Actor in a Series
Winner: Brian Wenzel in A Country Practice (Seven Network)

Best Supporting Actress in a Series
Winner: Sheila Florance in Prisoner (Network Ten)

Best Lead Actor in a Miniseries or Telemovie
Winner: Brenton Whittle in Sara Dane (Seven Network)

Best Lead Actress in a Miniseries or Telemovie
Winner: Judy Morris in Jimmy Dancer (ABC)

Best Supporting Actor in a Miniseries or Telemovie
Winner: Adrian Wright in 1915 (ABC)

Best Supporting Actress in a Miniseries or Telemovie
Winner: Ilona Rodgers in Sara Dane (Seven Network)

Best Juvenile Performance
Winner: Jeremy Shadlow in A Country Practice (Seven Network)

TV Reporter of the Year
Winner: Ray Martin in 60 Minutes (Nine Network)

Special Award for Sustained Excellence
Receiver: Mike Walsh (Nine Network)

=== Most Popular Programs ===
Most Popular Drama Series
Winner: Sons and Daughters (Seven Network)

Most Popular Variety Series
Winner: The Mike Walsh Show (Nine Network)

Most Popular Public Affairs Program
Winner: 60 Minutes (Nine Network)

Most Popular Quiz/Game Show
Winner: Sale of the Century (Nine Network)

Most Popular Comedy Series
Winner: Kingswood Country (Seven Network)

=== Best/Outstanding Programs ===
Best Miniseries or Telemovie
Winner: 1915 (ABC)

Best Documentary Series
Winner: John Laws' World (Network Ten)

Nominees: A Big Country (ABC)

Best Single Documentary
Winner: Quentin (Seven Network)

Nominees: The Survivor: Douglas Mawson (ABC), Greed (Network Ten), A Shifting Dreaming (Nine Network), The Ultimate Struggle (Seven Network)

Best Sports Coverage
Winner: 12th Commonwealth Games (ABC)

Nominees: The Ashes Centenary Series (Nine Network), James Hardie 1000 (Seven Network), Melbourne Cup (Network Ten)

Best Children's TV Series
Winner: Shirl's Neighbourhood (Seven Network)

Outstanding Public Affairs Report
Winner: "Annie", 60 Minutes (Nine Network)

Outstanding Contribution by a Regional Station
Winner: Last Chance (NBN-3, Newcastle)

Special Award for Outstanding Contribution to 25 Years of TV Variety
Receiver: Nine Network

== State Awards ==
=== New South Wales ===
Most Popular Male
Winner: Mike Walsh (Nine Network)

Most Popular Female
Winner: Katrina Lee (Network Ten)

Most Popular Show
Winner: The Mike Walsh Show (Nine Network)

=== Queensland ===
Most Popular Male
Winner: Earle Bailey (Seven Network)

Most Popular Female
Winner: Jacki MacDonald (Network Ten)

Most Popular Show
Winner: Today Tonight (Nine Network)

=== South Australia ===
Most Popular Male
Winner: Guy Blackmore (Seven Network)

Most Popular Female
Winner: Anne Wills (Network Ten)

Most Popular Show
Winner: State Affair (Seven Network)

=== Tasmania ===
Most Popular Male
Winner: Bert Taylor (TVT-6)

Most Popular Female
Winner: Jennifer Jones (TVT-6)

Most Popular Show
Winner: TVT Documentaries (TVT-6)

=== Victoria ===
Most Popular Male
Winner: Daryl Somers (Nine Network)

Most Popular Female
Winner: Paula Duncan (Seven Network)

Most Popular Show
Winner: Cop Shop (Seven Network)

=== Western Australia ===
Most Popular Male
Winner: Rick Ardon (Seven Network)

Most Popular Female
Winner: Judy Thompson (Seven Network)

Most Popular Show
Winner: Turpie Tonight (Seven Network)

== Performers ==
- Dennis Waterman
- Doug Parkinson
- Jimmy Hannan
- Syd Heylen
