= Logie Awards of 1977 =

Australian TV awards

19th Logie Awards
- Date: 25 March 1977
- Site: Southern Cross Hotel, Melbourne, Victoria
- Hosted by: Bert Newton
- Gold Logie: Don Lane

Television coverage
- Network: Nine Network

The 19th Annual TV Week Logie Awards were presented on Friday 25 March 1977 at Southern Cross Hotel in Melbourne and broadcast on the Nine Network. Bert Newton from the Nine Network was the Master of Ceremonies. American film star Burt Lancaster and television actors Lawrence Hilton-Jacobs, Susan Seaforth and Bill Hayes, British actors Robin Nedwell and Geoffrey Davies, and Australian actor Jack Thompson appeared as guests. Kate Jackson, star of Charlie's Angels, was scheduled to appear but cancelled at the last minute to start filming on the television movie James at 15.

== Awards ==
Winners of Logie Awards (Australian television) for 1977:

=== Gold Logie ===
Most Popular Male Personality on Australian Television

Presented by Burt Lancaster

Winner: Don Lane, The Don Lane Show, Nine Network

Nominated:

Bert Newton, The Don Lane Show, Nine Network
Mike Walsh, The Mike Walsh Show, 0-10 Network

Most Popular Female Personality on Australian Television

Presented by Burt Lancaster

Winner: Jeanne Little, The Mike Walsh Show, 0-10 Network

Nominated:

Denise Drysdale
Pat McDonald
Bunney Brooke

=== Logie ===
==== National ====
Most Popular Australian Lead Actor
Winner: Martin Vaughan, Power Without Glory, ABC

Most Popular Australian Lead Actress
Winner: Ros Spiers, Power Without Glory, ABC

Most Popular Australian Drama
Winner: Power Without Glory, ABC

Most Popular Australian TV Teenage Personality
Winner: Mark Holden

Most Popular Australian Comedy
Winner: The Paul Hogan Show, Nine Network

Most Popular Variety Show
Winner: The Don Lane Show, Nine Network

Most Popular Commercial
Winner: Coca-Cola

Best Individual Performance By An Actor
Winner: Hugh Keays-Byrne, Rush, ABC

Best Individual Performance By An Actress
Winner: Lyndell Rowe, Tandarra, Seven Network

Best Sustained Performance By An Actor In A Supporting Role
Winner: John Wood, Power Without Glory, ABC

Nominated:

Terence Donovan, Power Without Glory
Alain Doutey, Rush
John Diedrich, Bluey

Best Sustained Performance By An Actress In A Supporting Role
Winner: Wendy Hughes, Power Without Glory, ABC

Nominated:

Irene Inescort, Power Without Glory
Heather Canning, Power Without Glory
Gerda Nicholson, Bluey

Best New Drama
Winner: The Sullivans, Nine Network

Nominated:

Rush
Ben Hall

Best Drama Script
Winner: Colin Free, Rush, ABC

Best News Report
Winner: Ahmad fire, Graham Cumming, Nine Network News

Best Public Affairs Program
Winner: A Current Affair, Nine Network

Outstanding Contribution To TV Journalism
Winner: "Cedar Bay", This Day Tonight, Brisbane, ABC (reporter: Andrew Olle)

Best TV Interviewer
Winner: Mike Willesee

Nominated:

Caroline Jones
Robert Moore
Michael Schulberger

Best News Documentary
Winner: Katingal, Paul Mullins, Network Ten

Best Documentary Script
Winner: Fred "Cul" Cullen, Australians At War, Network Ten

Best Documentary Series
Winner: Australians At War, Network Ten

Best Sporting Documentary
Winner: Sportsnight, ABC

Best Musical Variety Special
Winner: Neil Diamond's Thank You Australia Concert, Nine Network

Outstanding Performance By A Juvenile
Winner: Greg Stroud, Solo One, Seven Network

Outstanding Contribution By A Regional Station
Winner: The Executives, WIN4, Wollongong

==== Victoria ====
Most Popular Male
Winner: Don Lane

Most Popular Female
Winner: Mary Hardy

Most Popular Show
Winner: The Don Lane Show, GTV-9

==== New South Wales ====
Most Popular Male
Winner: Mike Walsh

Most Popular Female
Winner: Jeanne Little

Most Popular Show
Winner: The Mike Walsh Show, TEN-10

==== South Australia ====
Most Popular Male
Winner: Sandy Roberts

Most Popular Female
Winner: Pam Tamblyn

Most Popular Show
Winner: Pam And Steve's Super Fun Show, ADS-7

==== Queensland ====
Most Popular Male
Winner: Paul Sharratt

Most Popular Female
Winner: Jacki MacDonald

Most Popular Show
Winner: Studio 9, QTQ-9

==== Tasmania ====
Most Popular Male
Winner: Tom Payne

Most Popular Female
Winner: Louise Kent

Most Popular Show
Winner: This Week, TVT-6

==== Western Australia ====
Most Popular Male
Winner: Peter Waltham

Most Popular Female
Winner: Jenny Clemesha

Most Popular Show
Winner: Hey Jude, TVW-7

=== Special Achievement Award ===
George Wallace Memorial Logie for Best New Talent
Winner: Mark Holden
