= Logie Awards of 1975 =

17th Logie Awards
- Date: 7 March 1975
- Site: Southern Cross Hotel, Melbourne, Victoria
- Hosted by: Bert Newton
- Gold Logie: Ernie Sigley

Television coverage
- Network: Nine Network

The 17th Annual TV Week Logie Awards were presented on Friday 7 March 1975 at Southern Cross Hotel in Melbourne and broadcast on the Nine Network. It was the first time the Awards were telecast in Colour. Bert Newton from the Nine Network was the Master of Ceremonies. American film star John Wayne and television actors Lee Majors and William Conrad, British actor Edward Woodward and his wife Michele Dotrice, and Australian-born British television stars Keith Michell and Diane Cilento appeared as guests. Each of the guest presenters were given special souvenir Logies.

== Awards ==
Winners of Logie Awards (Australian television) for 1975:

=== Gold Logie ===
Awards presented by John Wayne

Most Popular Male Personality on Australian Television
Winner: Ernie Sigley, The Ernie Sigley Show, Nine Network

Most Popular Female Personality on Australian Television
Winner: Denise Drysdale, The Ernie Sigley Show, Nine Network

=== Logie ===
==== National ====
Best Australian Actor
Winner: George Mallaby, The Box, 0-10 Network

Best Australian Actress
Winner: Bunney Brooke, Number 96, 0-10 Network

Best Australian Drama
Winner: Number 96, 0-10 Network

Best Australian Teenage Personality
Winner: Debbie Byrne, Young Talent Time, 0-10 Network

Best Australian Music/Variety Show
Winner: Young Talent Time, 0-10 Network

Best Australian Commercial
Winner: Uncle Sam

Best Individual Performance By An Actor
Winner: John Meillon, The Fourth Wish, ABC

Best Individual Performance By An Actress
Winner: Pat Evison, Pig in a Poke, ABC

Best TV Comedian
Winner: Paul Hogan, The Paul Hogan Show, Seven Network

Best New Drama
Winner: Rush, ABC

Best Script
Winner: Fred Cullen, Homicide, Seven Network

Best News Coverage
Winner: Frank Sinatra in Australia, David Hill, Seven Network News

Best Public Affairs Program
Winner: A Current Affair, Nine Network

Reporter Of The Year
Winner: Richard Carleton, This Day Tonight, ABC

Contribution To TV Journalism
Winner: Federal File, Nine Network

Best Single Documentary
Winner: Casley's Kingdom, David Johnston, Seven Network

Best Dramatised Documentary
Winner: Billy and Percy, ABC

Outstanding Contribution To TV
Winner: Bill Peach, for eight years' service to This Day Tonight, ABC

Outstanding Creative Effort
Winner: Tedd Dunn, Fredd Bear's Breakfast A-Go-Go, ATV-0

Outstanding Contribution To Daytime TV
Winner: No Man's Land, Nine Network

==== Victoria ====
Most Popular Male
Winner: Ernie Sigley

Most Popular Female
Winner: Denise Drysdale

Most Popular Show
Winner: The Ernie Sigley Show, GTV-9

==== New South Wales ====
Most Popular Male
Winner: Mike Walsh

Most Popular Female
Winner: Barbara Rogers

Most Popular Show
Winner: The Mike Walsh Show, TEN-10

==== South Australia ====
Most Popular Male
Winner: Bob Francis

Most Popular Female
Winner: Anne Wills

Most Popular Show
Winner: Penthouse Club, ADS-7

==== Queensland ====
Most Popular Male
Winner: Paul Sharratt

Most Popular Female
Winner: Rhonda Sharratt

Most Popular Show
Winner: Studio 9, QTQ-9

==== Tasmania ====
Most Popular Male
Winner: Tom Payne

Most Popular Female
Winner: Margaret Anne Ford

Most Popular Show
Winner: This Week

==== Western Australia ====
Most Popular Male
Winner: Jeff Newman

Most Popular Female
Winner: Sandy Palmer

Most Popular Show
Winner: Stars Of The Future, TVW-7

=== Special Achievement Award ===
George Wallace Memorial Award For Best New Talent
Winner: John Waters, Rush, ABC
