= Logie Awards of 1973 =

15th Logie Awards
- Date: 16 February 1973
- Site: Southern Cross Hotel, Melbourne, Victoria
- Hosted by: Bert Newton
- Gold Logie: Tony Barber

Television coverage
- Network: Nine Network

The 15th Annual TV Week Logie Awards were presented on Friday 16 February 1973 at the Southern Cross Hotel in Melbourne and broadcast on the Nine Network. Bert Newton was the Master of Ceremonies. American film star Glenn Ford and television actors Michael Cole, Gail Fisher and Loretta Swit were in attendance as guest presenters. The programme is remembered for a drunken, incoherent acceptance speech from Cole which concluded with a swear word.

== Awards ==
Winners of Logie Awards (Australian television) for 1973:

=== Gold Logie ===
Most Popular Personality on Australian Television

Presented by Glenn Ford and Loretta Swit

Winner: Tony Barber, Great Temptation, Seven Network

=== National Logie ===
Best Actor
Winner: Gerard Kennedy, Division 4, Nine Network

Best Actress
Winner: Pat McDonald, Number 96, Network Ten

Best Australian Drama
Winner: Homicide, Seven Network

Best Teenage Personality
Winner: Johnny Farnham

Best Australian Comedy
Winner: The Godfathers, Nine Network

Best Compere
Winner: Bert Newton, The Graham Kennedy Show, Nine Network

Best American Show
Winner: The Mod Squad

Best British Show
Winner: On The Buses

Best Commercial
Winner: Winfield Cigarettes

Best New Drama
Winner: Number 96, Network Ten

Best Scriptwriter
Winner: Frank Hardy, Boney, Seven Network

Best Single Performance By An Actress
Winner: Anna Volska, Behind The Legend, ABC

Best Single Performance By An Actor
Winner: James Laurenson, Boney, Seven Network

Best News Coverage
Winner: George Street bombings, Greg Grainger, Nine Network news

Best Public Affairs Program
Winner: A Current Affair, Nine Network

Outstanding Contribution To TV Journalism
Winner: Caroline Jones, ABC

Best Documentary
Winner: Rod Kinnear, Jane Cooper doco

Best Documentary Series
Winner: Shell's Australia, Seven Network

Outstanding Creative Effort
Winner: John Power, Like A Summer Storm, ABC

Contribution To Children's TV
Winner: Godfrey Philipp, Adventure Island, ABC

=== State Logie ===
==== Victoria ====
Most Popular Male
Winner: Graham Kennedy

Most Popular Female
Winner: Mary Hardy

Most Popular Show
Winner: The Graham Kennedy Show, Nine Network

==== New South Wales ====
Most Popular Male
Winner: Tony Barber

Most Popular Female
Winner: Barbara Rogers

Most Popular Show
Winner: Great Temptation, Seven Network

==== Queensland ====
Most Popular Male
Winner: Ron Cadee

Most Popular Female
Winner: Dina Heslop

Most Popular Show
Winner: I've Got A Secret, Nine Network

==== South Australia ====
Most Popular Male
Winner: Ernie Sigley

Most Popular Female
Winner: Anne Wills

Most Popular Show
Winner: Adelaide Tonight, Nine Network

==== Tasmania ====
Most Popular Male
Winner: Graeme Smith

Most Popular Female
Winner: Sue Gray

Most Popular Show
Winner: Smith's Weekly

==== Western Australia ====
Most Popular Male
Winner: Jeff Newman

Most Popular Female
Winner: Sandy Palmer

Most Popular Show
Winner: Anything Goes, Seven Network

=== Special Achievement Awards ===
George Wallace Memorial Logie For Best New Talent
Winner: Paul Hogan, The Paul Hogan Show, Seven Network
