= Logie Awards of 1981 =

23rd Logie Awards
- Date: 10 April 1981
- Site: Centrepoint Convention Centre, Sydney, New South Wales
- Hosted by: Michael Parkinson

Highlights
- Gold Logie: Bert Newton
- Most awards: 60 Minutes, Cop Shop, The Mike Walsh Show, Prisoner and The Sullivans (3)

Television coverage
- Network: Network Ten

The 23rd Annual TV Week Logie Awards was held on Friday 10 April 1981 at the Centrepoint Convention Centre in Sydney, and broadcast on Network Ten. The ceremony was hosted by Michael Parkinson. Guests included Patrick Duffy, Gil Gerard, Lesley-Anne Down, Sam J. Jones, Adam Rich, Van Johnson and Lindsay Wagner.

== National Awards ==
=== Gold Logie ===
Winner: Bert Newton in The Don Lane Show (Nine Network)

=== Acting/Presenting ===
Most Popular Actor
Winner: Peter Adams in Cop Shop (Seven Network)

Most Popular Actress
Winner: Paula Duncan in Cop Shop (Seven Network)

Most Popular New Talent
Winner: Simon Gallaher in The Mike Walsh Show (Nine Network)

Best Lead Actor in a Series
Winner: Peter Adams in Cop Shop (Seven Network)

Best Lead Actress in a Series
Winner: Sheila Florance in Prisoner (Network Ten)

Best Supporting Actor in a Series
Winner: Michael Caton in The Sullivans (Nine Network)

Best Supporting Actress in a Series
Winner: Vivean Gray in The Sullivans (Nine Network)

Best Lead Actor in a Miniseries or Telemovie
Winner: John Jarratt in The Last Outlaw (Seven Network)

Best Lead Actress in a Miniseries or Telemovie
Winner: Robyn Nevin in Water Under the Bridge (Network Ten)

Best Performance by a Juvenile
Winner: Mark Spain in The Restless Years (Network Ten)

TV Reporter of the Year
Winner: Ray Martin in 60 Minutes (Nine Network)

=== Most Popular Programs ===
Most Popular Drama Series
Winner: Prisoner (Network Ten)

Most Popular Variety or Comedy Show
Winner: The Mike Walsh Show (Nine Network)

Most Popular Public Affairs Show
Winner: 60 Minutes (Nine Network)

=== Best/Outstanding Programs ===
Best Miniseries or Telemovie
Winner: Cold Comfort (ABC)

Best Children's Television Series
Winner: Simon Townsend's Wonder World (Network Ten)

Best Sports Coverage
Winner: The 1980 Moscow Olympic Games (Seven Network)

Best Documentary Series
Winner: A Big Country (ABC)

Best Single Documentary
Winner: Bird of the Thunderwoman (ABC)

Best News Report
Winner: "Moreton Bay Rescue", Seven News (Seven Network)

Outstanding Public Affairs Report
Winner: "The Chelmsford File", 60 Minutes (Nine Network)

Outstanding Community Service
Winner: "Target 2000" (Network Ten)

Outstanding Contribution by a Regional Station
Winner: Footsteps of A Legend (GMV-6, Shepparton)

Special Logie For Sustained Excellence
Winner: The Sullivans (Nine Network)

== State Awards ==
=== New South Wales ===
Most Popular Male
Winner: Mike Walsh (Nine Network)

Most Popular Female
Winner: Katrina Lee (Network Ten)

Most Popular Show
Winner: The Mike Walsh Show (Nine Network)

=== Queensland ===
Most Popular Male
Winner: Andrew Carroll (Nine Network)

Most Popular Female
Winner: Jacki MacDonald (Network Ten)

Most Popular Show
Winner: Today Tonight (Nine Network)

=== South Australia ===
Most Popular Male
Winner: Roger Cardwell (Nine Network)

Most Popular Female
Winner: Anne Wills (Nine Network)

Most Popular Show
Winner: Clapperboard (Nine Network)

=== Tasmania ===
Most Popular Male
Winner: Jim Cox (TNT-9)

Most Popular Female
Winner: Anne Waterhouse (TNT-9)

Most Popular Show
Winner: Tasmanian New Faces (TNT-9)

=== Victoria ===
Most Popular Male
Winner: Bert Newton (Nine Network)

Most Popular Female
Winner: Paula Duncan (Seven Network)

Most Popular Show
Winner: Prisoner (Network Ten)

=== Western Australia ===
Most Popular Male
Winner: Terry Willesee (Nine Network)

Most Popular Female
Winner: Ann Sanders (Seven Network)

Most Popular Show
Winner: Terry Willesee's Perth (Nine Network)

== Performers ==
- Anthony Newley
- Dame Edna Everage
