= Logie Awards of 1972 =

15th Logie Awards
- Date: 18 February 1972
- Site: Southern Cross Hotel, Melbourne, Victoria
- Hosted by: Bert Newton
- Gold Logie: Gerard Kennedy

Television coverage
- Network: Nine Network

The 14th Annual TV Week Logie Awards were presented on Friday 18 February 1972 at the Southern Cross Hotel in Melbourne. The awards were broadcast live on the Nine Network in Sydney, Brisbane, and Adelaide and broadcast later elsewhere. Bert Newton from the Nine Network was the Master of Ceremonies. The awards featured appearances by Rock Hudson and Roger Moore. Juliet Mills, Kenneth Connor and Robert Reed were also present.

The Gold Logie was won by Gerard Kennedy for his lead role in Division 4 and he also won best actor with Pat Smith winning the best actress award for her role in the same series. Division 4 also won the best Australian drama. This article lists the winners of Logie Awards (Australian television) for 1971:

== Awards ==
=== Gold Logie ===
Most Popular Personality on Australian Television

Presented by Rock Hudson

Winner:

Gerard Kennedy

=== Logie ===
==== National ====
Best Actor
Winner:

Gerard Kennedy, Division 4, Nine Network

Best Actress
Winner:

Pat Smith, Division 4, Nine Network

Best Australian Drama
Winner:

Division 4, Nine Network

Best Teenage Personality
Winner:

Johnny Farnham

Best Australian Comedy
Winner:

The Group, Seven Network

Best Australian Music/Variety Show
Winner:

Young Talent Time, Network Ten

Best Compere
Winner:

Bert Newton, In Melbourne Tonight, Nine Network

Best Overseas Drama USA
Winner:

The Mod Squad

Best Overseas Drama UK
Winner:

The Persuaders

Best Commercial
Winner:

Fanta

Best New Drama Series
Winner:

Matlock Police, Network Ten

Best Scriptwriter
Winner:

Tony Morphett, Dynasty, ABC

Best Individual Acting Performance
Winner:

Jack Fegan, Division 4, Nine Network

Best News Coverage
Winner:

Victoria-Springbok rugby match

Outstanding Creative Effort
Winner:

Dead Men Running, ABC

Outstanding Contribution To TV Journalism
Winner:

Dateline '71, Network Ten

==== Victoria ====
Most Popular Male
Winner:

Frank Wilson

Most Popular Female
Winner:

Mary Hardy

Most Popular Program
Winner:

Penthouse Club, Seven Network

==== New South Wales ====
Most Popular Male
Winner:

Bob Rogers

Most Popular Female
Winner:

Penny Spence

Most Popular Program
Winner:

The Bob Rogers Show, Seven Network

==== Queensland ====
Most Popular Male
Winner:

Ron Cadee

Most Popular Female
Winner:

Dina Heslop

Most Popular Program
Winner:

I've Got A Secret, Nine Network

==== South Australia ====
Most Popular Male
Winner:

Ernie Sigley

Most Popular Female
Winner:

Anne Wills

Most Popular Program
Winner:

Adelaide Tonight, Nine Network

==== Tasmania ====
Most Popular Male
Winner:

Graeme Smith

Most Popular Female
Winner:

Sue Gray

Most Popular Program
Winner:

Smith's Weekly

==== Western Australia ====
Most Popular Male
Winner:

Jeff Newman

Most Popular Female
Winner:

Jenny Clemesha

Most Popular Program
Winner:

Stars Of The Future, Seven Network

=== Special Achievement Awards ===
George Wallace Memorial Logie For Best New Talent
Winner:

Jamie Redfern, Young Talent Time, Network Ten
