= Kids Only =

1986 Australian TV series

- Genre: Children's television series
- Country of origin: Australia
- Original language: English
- No. of seasons: 3

Production
- Production locations: Ballarat, Victoria, Australia

Original release
- Network: Nine Network
- Release: 1986 – 1988

Kids Only is an Australian children's television show which screened on the Nine Network from 1986 to 1988 hosted by Glenn Ridge, who went on to host Sale of the Century.

== See also ==
- List of Australian television series
- Wombat
