= Logie Awards of 1989 =

Australian TV award

31st Logie Awards
- Date: 17 March 1989
- Site: Hyatt on Collins, Melbourne, Victoria
- Hosted by: Bert Newton

Highlights
- Gold Logie: Daryl Somers
- Hall of Fame: Bryan Brown
- Most awards: Neighbours and The Shiralee (3)

Television coverage
- Network: Seven Network

The 31st Annual TV Week Logie Awards was held on Friday 17 March 1989 at the Hyatt on Collins in Melbourne, and broadcast on the Seven Network. The ceremony was hosted by Bert Newton and guests included Raquel Welch, Leslie Nielsen and Bryan Brown.

== Winners ==
=== Gold Logie ===
Most Popular Personality on Australian Television
Winner: Daryl Somers in Hey Hey It's Saturday (Nine Network)

Nominees: Kylie Minogue, Craig McLachlan, Jason Donovan

=== Acting/Presenting ===
Most Popular Actor
Winner: Craig McLachlan in Neighbours (Network Ten)

Nominees: Alex Papps in Home and Away (Seven Network), Jason Donovon in Neighbours (Network Ten)

Most Popular Actress
Winner: Annie Jones in Neighbours (Network Ten)

Nominees: Nicolle Dickson in Home and Away (Seven Network), Kylie Minogue in Neighbours (Network Ten)

Most Popular Actor in a Telemovie or Miniseries
Winner: Bryan Brown in The Shiralee (Seven Network)

Nominees: Hugo Weaving in The Dirtwater Dynasty (Network Ten), Vince Colosimo in All the Way (Nine Network)

Most Popular Actress in a Telemovie or Miniseries
Winner: Rebecca Smart in The Shiralee (Seven Network)

Nominees: Dannii Minogue in All the Way (Nine Network), Noni Hazlehurst in The Shiralee (Seven Network)

Most Outstanding Actor
Winner: John Wood in Rafferty's Rules (Seven Network)

Nominees: Simon Chilvers in Rafferty's Rules (Seven Network), Robert Grubb in The Flying Doctors (Nine Network)

Most Outstanding Actress
Winner: Joan Sydney in A Country Practice (Seven Network)

Nominees: Linda Cropper in Melba (Seven Network); Di Smith in A Country Practice (Seven Network)

Most Popular Light Entertainment or Comedy Personality
Winner: Mary-Anne Fahey in The Comedy Company (Network Ten)

Nominees: Mark Mitchell in The Comedy Company (Network Ten), Daryl Somers in Hey Hey It's Saturday (Nine Network)

Most Popular New Talent
Winner: Nicolle Dickson in Home and Away (Seven Network)

Nominees: Rachel Friend in Neighbours (Network Ten), Rebecca Smart in The Shiralee (Seven Network)

=== Most Popular Programs/Videos ===
Most Popular Series
Winner: Neighbours (Network Ten)

Nominees: Home and Away (Seven Network), A Country Practice (Seven Network)

Most Popular Telemovie or Miniseries
Winner: The Shiralee (Seven Network)

Nominees: The Dirtwater Dynasty (Network Ten), All the Way (Nine Network)

Most Popular Light Entertainment or Comedy Program
Winner: The Comedy Company (Network Ten)

Nominees: Hey Dad..! (Seven Network), Hey Hey It's Saturday (Nine Network)

Most Popular Public Affairs Program
Winner: A Current Affair (Nine Network)

Nominees: Hinch (Seven Network), 60 Minutes (Nine Network)

Most Popular Sports Coverage
Winner: Seoul Olympic Games (Network Ten)

Nominees: Cricket (Nine Network), Summer of Tennis (Seven Network)

Most Popular Children's Show
Winner: Wombat (Seven Network)

Nominees: The Early Bird Show (Network Ten), Young Talent Time (Network Ten)

Most Popular Music Video
Winner: "Age of Reason" by John Farnham

Nominees: "Especially for You" by Kylie & Jason, "Two Strong Hearts" by John Farnham

=== Most Outstanding Programs ===
Most Outstanding Single Documentary or Documentary Series
Winner: Nature of Australia (ABC TV)

Most Outstanding Achievement in News
Winner: "Walsh Street shootings", Michael Venus (Nine Network)

Most Outstanding Achievement in Public Affairs
Winner: Four Corners (ABC TV)

Most Outstanding Achievement by Regional Television
Winner: Walkabout Documentaries (RTQ7)

== Performers ==
- "The Golden Girls" (Lorrae Desmond, Hazel Phillips, Pat McDonald, Jeanne Little, Denise Drysdale, Rowena Wallace)
- John Farnham
- Norman Gunston

== Hall of Fame ==
After years in the Australian television industry, Bryan Brown became the sixth inductee into the TV Week Logies Hall of Fame.

== In popular culture ==
The 1989 Logie Awards was depicted in The Newsreader in the first episode of the third season, Night of Nights.

In this episode the fictional Dale Jennings was nominated for the Gold Logie for Most Popular Personality in place of Craig McLachlan at the real event.

Jennings won the Logie in place of the real winner Daryl Somers.
