= Logie Awards of 1964 =

6th Logie Awards
- Date: 21 March 1964
- Site: Marconi Liber in Sydney
- Gold Logie: Bobby Limb

Television coverage
- Network: Nine Network

The 6th Annual TV Week Logie Awards were presented on Saturday 21 March 1964 aboard the Lloyd Triestino cruise liner Marconi Liber in Sydney. The winner of the Gold Logie was Bobby Limb. The awards were broadcast on the Nine Network. This article lists the winners of Logie Awards (Australian television) for 1964:

== Awards ==
=== Gold Logie ===
Most Popular Personality on Australian Television
Winner: Bobby Limb

=== Logie ===
==== National ====
Best Overseas Show
Winner: Bonanza

Best Male Singer
Winner: Bill Newman

Best Female Singer
Winner: Robyn Alvarez

Best Commercial
Winner: Coca-Cola

Best National Variety Show
Winner: The Delo and Daly Show

Outstanding Newscoverage
Winner: Federal Election

Best Children's Entertainment
Winner: Aladdin

Outstanding Documentary
Winner: Bob Raymond, for work at TCN and Four Corners

==== Victoria ====
Most Popular Male
Joint Winners: Graham Kennedy & Bert Newton

Most Popular Female
Winner: Rosie Sturgess

Most Popular Program
Winner: Noel Ferrier's I.M.T.

==== New South Wales ====
Most Popular Male
Winner: Dave Allen

Most Popular Female
Winner: Judy Stone

Most Popular Program
Winner: Tonight with Dave Allen

==== South Australia ====
Most Popular Male
Winner: Ernie Sigley

Most Popular Female
Winner: Glenys O'Brien

Most Popular Program
Winner: Country and Western Hour

==== Queensland ====
Most Popular Male
Winner: George Wallace Jnr

Most Popular Female
Winner: Jackie Ellison

Most Popular Program
Winner: Theatre Royal

==== Tasmania ====
Most Popular Personality
Winner: Graeme Smith

=== Special Achievement Award ===
Special Award for Outstanding Production
Winner: Bandstand

Special Award for Recording
Winner: Rob E.G. (Robie Porter)
