= Logie Awards of 1976 =

18th Logie Awards
- Date: 12 March 1976
- Site: Southern Cross Hotel, Melbourne, Victoria
- Hosted by: Bert Newton
- Gold Logie: Norman Gunston

Television coverage
- Network: Nine Network

The 18th Annual TV Week Logie Awards were presented on Friday 12 March 1976 at Southern Cross Hotel in Melbourne and broadcast on the Nine Network. Bert Newton from the Nine Network was the Master of Ceremonies. American film star Lee Marvin; television actors Henry Winkler, Martin Milner and Arte Johnson; and British actors Gordon Jackson and Susannah York appeared as guests.

== Awards ==
Winners of Logie Awards (Australian television) for 1976:

=== Gold Logie ===
Awards presented by Lee Marvin

Most Popular Male Personality on Australian Television
Winner: Norman Gunston (Garry McDonald), The Norman Gunston Show, ABC

Most Popular Female Personality on Australian Television
Winner: Denise Drysdale, The Ernie Sigley Show, Nine Network

=== Logie ===
==== National ====
Best Australian Actor
Winner: Paul Karo, The Box, 0–10 Network

Best Australian Actress
Winner: Pat McDonald, Number 96, 0–10 Network

Best Australian Drama
Winner: Number 96, 0–10 Network

Best Australian Teenage Personality
Winner: John Paul Young

Best Australian Music/Variety Show
Winner: Young Talent Time, 0–10 Network

Best Commercial
Winner: Uncle Sam

Best Individual Performance By An Actor
Winner: Chris Haywood, Essington, ABC

Best Individual Performance By An Actress
Winner: Maggie Millar, Homicide, Seven Network

Best New Drama
Winner: Cash and Company, Seven Network

Best Script
Winner: Thomas Keneally, Essington, ABC

Best Single Episode In A Series
Winner: "Little Raver", Division 4, Nine Network

Best News Report
Winner: Timor report, Gerald Stone, Nine Network

Best Public Affairs Program
Winner: A Current Affair, Nine Network

Best TV Interviewer
Winner: Michael Schildberger, A Current Affair, Nine Network

Best News Documentary
Winner: Of Course I Love Jim Cairns, Nine Network

Best Single Documentary
Winner: You Just Don't Realise, 0–10 Network

Best Documentary Series
Winner: A Big Country, ABC

For Faith And Continuing Investment In Australian Drama
Winner: Hector Crawford

Best Teenage Television
Winner: Countdown, ABC

Outstanding Performance By A Juvenile
Winner: Jacqui Lochhead, Matlock Police

Outstanding Contribution By A Regional Station
Winner: The World Of Jesus Christ Superstar, NBN-3 Newcastle

==== Victoria ====
Most Popular Male
Winner: Ernie Sigley

Most Popular Female
Winner: Denise Drysdale

Most Popular Show
Winner: The Ernie Sigley Show, Nine Network

==== New South Wales ====
Most Popular Male
Winner: Mike Walsh

Most Popular Female
Winner: Jeanne Little

Most Popular Show
Winner: The Mike Walsh Show, Network Ten

==== South Australia ====
Most Popular Male
Winner: Sandy Roberts

Most Popular Female
Winner: Winnie Pelz

Most Popular Show
Winner: Sound Unlimited, Seven Network

==== Queensland ====
Most Popular Male
Winner: Paul Sharratt

Most Popular Female
Winner: Jacki MacDonald

Most Popular Show
Winner: Studio 9, Nine Network

==== Tasmania ====
Most Popular Male
Winner: Tom Payne

Most Popular Female
Winner: Margaret Anne Ford

Most Popular Show
Winner: This Week

==== Western Australia ====
Most Popular Male
Winner: Jeff Newman

Most Popular Female
Winner: Marie Van Maaren

Most Popular Show
Winner: Stars Of The Future, Seven Network

=== Special Achievement Award ===
George Wallace Memorial Award For Best New Talent
Winner: Norman Gunston (Garry McDonald), The Norman Gunston Show, Seven Network
