= The Country and Western Hour =

The Country and Western Hour was an Australian television program featuring Australian country music. It was made in the Channel Nine Adelaide studios and networked nationally from 1963 to 1972.

Roger Cardwell hosted the program from 1963 to 1965, when Reg Lindsay took on the job. The Country & Western Hour was shown on Channel 9's other stations around the country, and ran with great success for seven and a half years until 1972.

The format was shown as a barn setting with hay bales, fences, implements, riding gear, etc. Colin Huddleston called square dancing each night with at least two squares of dancers.

Many well-known artists were featured on the show, including Auriel Andrew, Robyn Archer, John Farnham, Doug Ashdown, and Julie Anthony.
