= Logie Awards of 1978 =

20th Logie Awards
- Date: 3 March 1978
- Site: Southern Cross Hotel, Melbourne, Victoria
- Hosted by: Bert Newton
- Gold Logie: Graham Kennedy

Television coverage
- Network: Nine Network

The 20th Annual TV Week Logie Awards were presented on Friday 3 March 1978 at Southern Cross Hotel in Melbourne and broadcast on the Nine Network. Bert Newton from the Nine Network was the Master of Ceremonies. American singer Sammy Davis Jr., television actors Mike Farrell, Florence Henderson, Richard Anderson, and Patty Weaver, and British television host David Frost appeared as guests. Bob Hope also made a brief introduction via cable from Sydney.

== Awards ==
Winners of Logie Awards (Australian television) for 1978:

=== Gold Logie ===
Most Popular Personality on Australian Television

Presented by Sammy Davis Jr.

Winner:

Graham Kennedy, Blankety Blanks, Network Ten

Nominated:

Lorraine Bayly, The Sullivans, Nine Network
Don Lane, The Don Lane Show, Nine Network
Bert Newton, The Don Lane Show, Nine Network
Mike Walsh, The Mike Walsh Show, Nine Network

=== Silver Logies ===
Most Popular Lead Actor on Australian Television
Winner:

Paul Cronin, The Sullivans, Nine Network

Most Popular Lead Actress on Australian Television
Winner:

Lorraine Bayly, The Sullivans, Nine Network

=== Logie ===
==== National ====
Most Popular Australian Drama
Winner:

The Sullivans, Nine Network

Best New Talent In Australia
Winner:

Brandon Burke, Glenview High, Seven Network

Most Popular Australian TV Teenage Personality
Winner:

Mark Holden

Most Popular Australian Variety Or Panel Show
Winner:

Blankety Blanks, Network Ten

Most Popular Australian Commercial (last time this was awarded)
Winner:

Export Cola

Best Individual Performance By An Actor
Winner:

Neil Fitzpatrick, Pig in a Poke, ABC

Best Individual Performance By An Actress
Winner:

Jacki Weaver, Do I Have to Kill My Child?, Nine Network

Best Sustained Performance By An Actor In A Supporting Role
Winner:

Michael Caton, The Sullivans, Nine Network

Best Sustained Performance By An Actress In A Supporting Role
Winner:

Vivean Gray, The Sullivans, Nine Network

Best New Drama
Winner:

Cop Shop, Seven Network

Best Dramatic Script
Winner:

Margaret Kelly and John Dingwall, Pig in a Poke, ABC

Best Miniseries/Telemovie
Winner:

The Alternative, Seven Network

Best Comedy Performer
Winner:

Paul Hogan, The Paul Hogan Show, Nine Network

Best News Report
Winner:

Blue Mountains bushfires, Network Ten news

Outstanding Contribution To TV Journalism
Winner:

"The Werribee Incident", A Current Affair, Nine Network

Best Public Affairs Series
Winner:

Willesee at Seven, Seven Network

Best News Documentary
Winner:

"Utah", Four Corners, ABC

Best Documentary Series
Winner:

In the Wild, ABC

Outstanding Coverage Of A Sporting Event
Winner:

The Australian Open Golf, Nine Network

Outstanding Performance By A Juvenile
Winner:

Beau Cox, Young Ramsay, Seven Network

Outstanding Contribution To Community Service
Winner:

The National Survival Test, 0-10 Network

Outstanding Contribution By A Regional Station
Winner:

Ian, NBN3, Newcastle

==== Victoria ====
Most Popular Male
Winner:

Bert Newton

Most Popular Female
Winner:

Mary Hardy

Most Popular Show
Winner:

The Don Lane Show, Nine Network

==== New South Wales ====
Most Popular Male
Winner:

Mike Walsh

Most Popular Female
Winner:

Sue Smith

Most Popular Show
Winner:

The Mike Walsh Show, Nine Network

==== South Australia ====
Most Popular Male
Winner:

Roger Cardwell

Most Popular Female
Winner:

Helen Woods

Most Popular Show
Winner:

Super Fun Show, Seven Network

==== Queensland ====
Most Popular Male
Winner:

Paul Sharratt

Most Popular Female
Winner:

Jacki MacDonald

Most Popular Show
Winner:

Country Homestead, Nine Network

==== Tasmania ====
Most Popular Male
Winner:

Tom Payne

Most Popular Female
Winner:

Robyn Jackman

Most Popular Show
Winner:

This Week

==== Western Australia ====
Most Popular Male
Winner:

Terry Willesee

Most Popular Female
Winner:

Jenny Clemesha

Most Popular Show
Winner:

Channel Nine News
