= Logie Awards of 1979 =

21st Logie Awards
- Date: 16 March 1979
- Site: Hilton Hotel, Melbourne, Victoria
- Hosted by: Bert Newton
- Gold Logie: Bert Newton

Television coverage
- Network: Nine Network

The 21st Annual TV Week Logie Awards were presented on Friday 16 March 1979 at Hilton Hotel in Melbourne and broadcast on the Nine Network. Bert Newton was the Master of Ceremonies. American boxer Muhammad Ali, film stars Henry Silva and Cicely Tyson, television actors Robin Williams, Susan Seaforth, Bill Hayes and Lauren Tewes, British actor David Hemmings and television actors Yootha Joyce and Brian Murphy appeared as guests.

== Awards ==
Winners of Logie Awards (Australian television) for 1979:

=== Gold Logie ===
Most Popular Personality on Australian Television

Presented by Muhammad Ali

Winner: Bert Newton, The Don Lane Show, Nine Network

=== Silver Logies ===
Most Popular Lead Actor on Australian Television
Winner: Paul Cronin, The Sullivans, Nine Network

Most Popular Lead Actress on Australian Television
Winner: Lorraine Bayly, The Sullivans, Nine Network

==== National ====
Most Popular Drama Series
Winner: The Sullivans, Nine Network

Best New Talent In Australia
Winner: Jon English, Against The Wind, Seven Network

Most Popular Australian TV Teenage Personality
Winner: John Paul Young

Most Popular Australian Variety Or Panel Show
Winner: The Don Lane Show, Nine Network

Most Popular Comedy Show
Winner: The Paul Hogan Show, Nine Network

Best Performormance By An Actor In A Major Role
Winner: John Meillon, Bit Part, ABC

Best Performance By An Actress In A Major Role
Winner: Kerry McGuire, Against The Wind, Seven Network

Best Performance By An Actor In A Supporting Role
Winner: Peter Adams, Cop Shop, Seven Network

Best Performance By An Actress In A Supporting Role
Winner: Chantal Contouri, The Sullivans, Nine Network

Best New Drama
Winner: Against The Wind, Seven Network

Best Television Script
Winner: Michael Aitkens, "Neutral Ground"

Best Miniseries/Telemovie
Winner: Bit Part, ABC

Best News Report
Winner: Bank siege and chase, Nine Network News

TV Reporter Of The Year
Winner: Bill Bennett, Willesee at Seven, Seven Network

Best Documentary Series
Winner: A Big Country, ABC

Best Single Documentary
Winner: The Last Tasmanian, Network Ten

Outstanding Coverage Of A Sports Event
Winner: Bathurst Hardie Ferodo motor race, Seven Network

Best Sports Report/Documentary
Winner: Surfabout, Nine Network

Best Performance By A Juvenile
Winner: Warwick Poulsen, Because He's My Friend, ABC

Outstanding Contribution To Children's TV
Winner: Rainbow

Outstanding Contribution To Community Service
Winner: "Have A Go" campaign, Network Ten

Outstanding Contribution By A Regional Station
Winner: Goin' Down The Road, CBN8 Orange

==== Victoria ====
Most Popular Male
Winner: Bert Newton

Most Popular Female
Winner: Mary Hardy

Most Popular Show
Winner: The Don Lane Show, Nine Network

==== New South Wales ====
Most Popular Male
Winner: Mike Walsh

Most Popular Female
Winner: Noeline Brown

Most Popular Show
Winner: The Mike Walsh Show, Nine Network

==== Queensland ====
Most Popular Male
Winner: Paul Griffin, Nine Network

Most Popular Female
Winner: Jacki MacDonald

Most Popular Show
Winner: Country Homestead, Nine Network

==== South Australia ====
Most Popular Male
Winner: Ernie Sigley

Most Popular Female
Winner: Pam Tamblyn

Most Popular Show
Winner: The Ernie Sigley Show, Nine Network

==== Tasmania ====
Most Popular Male
Winner: Jim Cox

Most Popular Female
Winner: Kerry Smith

Most Popular Show
Winner: Saturday Night Show, TNT-9

==== Western Australia ====
Most Popular Male
Winner: Terry Willesee

Most Popular Female
Winner: Stephanie Quinlan

Most Popular Show
Winner: Channel Nine News, STW9

== Controversies during Logies Night ==
Before he won the Gold Logie, Bert Newton said to Muhammad Ali, 'I Like The Boy'.
