= Adelaide Tonight =

1959 Australian TV variety show

- Created by: Lionel Williams
- Starring: Lionel Williams; Kevin Crease; Ernie Sigley; Ian Fairweather; Gerry Gibson; Roger Cardwell; Anne Wills
- Country of origin: Australia

Production
- Running time: 30 minutes

Original release
- Network: Nine Network
- Release: 1959 – 1973

Adelaide Tonight was a nightly variety show, running four days a week at 9.30 pm on Nine Network, NWS-9 Adelaide. The show was broadcast live from Studio 1 between 1959 and 1973. The show was similar to In Melbourne Tonight with Graham Kennedy.

The comperes and presenters on the show were Lionel Williams, Kevin Crease, Ernie Sigley, Ian Fairweather, Gerry Gibson, Roger Cardwell and Anne Wills. Creator and host Lionel Williams who won a Logie award for the program died in 2016, aged 87.
