= State Affair =

State Affair was a current affairs program televised in Australia on Seven Network stations BTQ-7, ADS-7, and TVW-7 in the mid-1980s. It was the forerunner to Today Tonight.

The first edition aired in 1980 on BTQ-7. ADS-7, launched their edition with weekend news presenter, Guy Blackmore in 1981. The West Australian version followed in 1982.

Notable presenters included Simon Reeve (TVW-7) and Keith Conlon (ADS-10, ADS-7). It won a Logie Award in 1982 as the most popular South Australian program.
