= The Don Lane Show =

- Genre: Talk show
- Created by: Don Lane
- Directed by: Peter Faiman
- Presented by: Don Lane
- Narrated by: Pete Smith
- Opening theme: "You Make It So Easy"
- Country of origin: Australia
- Original language: English
- No. of seasons: 9

Production
- Producer: Peter Faiman
- Running time: 90 minutes

Original release
- Network: Nine Network
- Release: 8 May 1975 – 10 November 1983

The Don Lane Show is an Australian television talk show which aired twice a week on the Nine Network from 1975 to 1983. The show was created by Don Lane who co-hosted it with Bert Newton.

Channel Nine was reluctant to cast Bert Newton, who had been associated with Graham Kennedy, but Lane insisted that he wanted Newton to do the show. Lane is quoted as saying:

I used to watch him and Graham working on IMT, and look at them with great envy. So I said 'what about Bert Newton?' If I’m going to work with somebody I want to know that he's as sharp as anything and a real pro.

The theme music of the show in its later years was "You Make It So Easy", written by Helen Reddy and Carole Bayer Sager and first recorded for Reddy's 1976 album Music, Music.

== Legacy ==
The show, originating out of GTV-9's Television City studios in Richmond, Victoria, became one of the most popular talk shows in Australian television history. Its broadcast time-slot varied in its early years, including a brief stint in 1980 when it ran four nights a week, but eventually settled on Mondays and Thursdays at 9:30pm on the Nine Network and many stations across Australia. Some regional and remote commercial stations would receive the program on videotape for delayed broadcast.

Alongside Blue Heelers, The Don Lane Show is the most awarded show in the history of the Logie Awards, with five wins. Lane was inducted into the Logie Awards Hall of Fame in 2003.

== DVD release ==
In 2010, a two-disc DVD was released. In 2015, a four-disc version with new covers was released. The DVDs include episodes from 1981 to 1983, including the 1983 bushfire appeal special and the final episode.
