= Mike Walsh (TV host) =

Australian television host (born 1938)

Mike Walsh OBE AM
- Born: Michael Hayden Walsh; 5 March 1938 (age 88); Corowa, New South Wales, Australia
- Education: Melbourne University
- Occupations: Television presenter; radio presenter; actor; media personality; producer; theatre owner
- Years active: 1960−2013
- Known for: Host of The Mike Walsh Show
- Website: mikewalsh.com.au

Michael Hayden Walsh OBE AM (born 5 March 1938) is an Australian Gold Logie award winning former radio and television presenter, who later focused on owning and operating film cinemas and live theatres, as well as producing theatre shows, both locally and in the United Kingdom.

Walsh with his self-titled variety program The Mike Walsh Show, started out as a late-night variety show in 1969, before being launched as a day time format in 1972. Walsh was the longest-running host of daytime television, with his program at Network Ten and then Nine Network airing until 1985, featuring both local and international guests, including numerous Hollywood performers and political figures.

== Early life ==
Walsh was born in Corowa, New South Wales. and completed his education at Xavier College in Melbourne, before studying pharmacy and arts at Melbourne University where he was heavily involved in student theatre revues.

== Radio career ==
Walsh prior to starring on television was a radio disc jockey on 1260 3SR Shepparton and 3XY Melbourne, and a "Good Guy" on Sydney commercial radio station 2SM.

== Television career ==
Walsh hosted The Mike Walsh Show from 1973 to 1985. The program screened originally on the 0-10 network, the forerunner of Network Ten, before transferring to the Nine Network. It won 24 Logies, with Walsh winning a Gold Logie.

The program was renowned for introducing fellow Gold Logie winning personality Jeanne Little in 1974. The Mike Walsh Show became so popular in the midday time slot that it eventually moved to a night time format to try to reinvigorate night time variety.

The idea was to keep the midday show going but with a new host, whilst transferring the popularity of the Mike Walsh Show to the night time slot. Following speculation about who the host would be, Walsh announced on the midday show that, "there was only one choice for the new host and frankly if he had said no, we wouldn't have gone to night time. The host of the midday show for next year will be….Ray Martin". The announcement was greeted with rapturous applause and cheering, perhaps due to Martin's popularity as a 60 Minutes reporter. The Midday Show with Ray Martin ran for 13 years.

The night time show with Walsh was a failure and was cancelled after a few weeks. He returned to television for a 12-week chat and music show on the ABC in 1987.

He has the distinction of winning a Gold Logie and Sammy award in the same year. He has 24 Logies all up, and seven Sammys in total.

== Theatre and cinema entrepreneur ==
Walsh was the executive producer of two highly successful musicals, Nunsense and Anything Goes.

From 2006, Walsh has spent time in both Sydney and London producing theatre shows across Australia and on London's West End. These include:

- Nunsense (late 1987 to early 1989)
- Anything Goes in 1989
- Exit the King (opened March 2009) at Ethel Barrymore Theatre, Broadway
- Holding the Man (opened May 2010) at the Trafalgar Studios 1, London
- Umbrellas of Cherbourg (opened March 2011) at the Gielgud Theatre, West End
- Doris: Doris Day: More Than the Girl Next Door - (2011)
- A Chorus Line (opened February 2013) at the London Palladium Theatre

In 1977 he purchased Richmond's Regent Theatre, then in 1982 built a twin cinema complex in Penrith. Thereafter, he purchased two other cinemas and the Avalon. He has been the owner of Her Majesty's Theatre in Melbourne since 2000, funding and overseeing its restoration. Walsh also owns the Hayden Orpheum Picture Palace (purchased 1986), a 1935 art deco six-cinema complex in Cremorne, Sydney which he restored at a cost of $2.5 million, and which features a 1925 Wurlitzer orchestral pipe organ.

== Fellowships program ==
From 1996, Walsh financed the Mike Walsh Fellowships for young performers to hone their skills overseas and in Australia. From 2006 onwards, he has provided $50,000 (originally $30,000) each year for the fellowships. By 2015 this has added up to over $700,000 awarded to more than 90 Fellows.

== Honours ==
Walsh was honoured in 1980 with an award of Officer of the Order of the British Empire. In 2016 he was appointed a Member of the Order of Australia for significant service to the entertainment industry, and to the performing arts through support for young actors, theatre restoration and production.
