= Southern Cross Hotel =

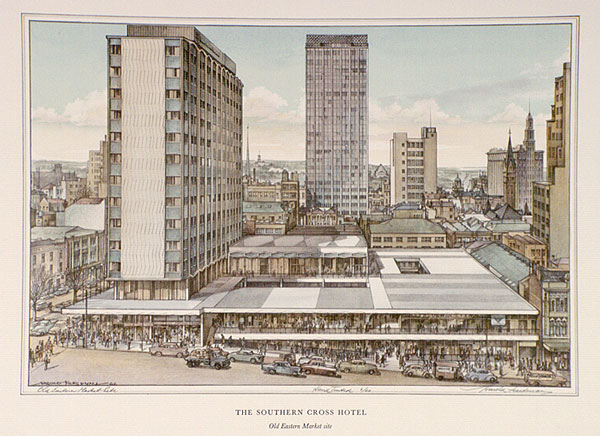
- Southern Cross Hotel Postcard c. 1962

- Location within Melbourne

General information
- Status: Demolished
- Type: Hotel
- Architectural style: Mid Century Modern
- Location: 131 Exhibition Street, Melbourne, Australia
- Coordinates: 37°48′45.8″S 144°58′13.5″E
- Completed: 1961
- Opened: 1962
- Closed: 1995
- Demolished: 2003
- Operator: InterContinental

Design and construction
- Architecture firm: Welton Becket and Associates in partnership with Leslie M Perrott & Partners

Other information
- Number of rooms: 435
- Parking: 350

The Southern Cross Hotel was a hotel in Melbourne, Australia. It was opened by Prime Minister Robert Menzies on 24 August 1962 as Australia's first modern 'International' hotel, heralding the arrival of American-style glamour, the jet-set and international tourism. It occupied a large site on Bourke Street in central Melbourne, formerly occupied by the grand Eastern Market, and was the premier hotel in the city into the early 1980s. The Southern Cross was the preferred hotel for celebrities in this period, most famously The Beatles in 1964, and the ballroom was the preferred location for locally and nationally important events.

Closed on 1 April 1995 and partly demolished, the hotel tower remained standing and vacant until its demolition in 2003.

== History ==
The half a city block site was occupied by the grand 1879 Eastern Market, and was owned by the City of Melbourne. Never having been successful as a food market, the structure had instead been the home of a variety of shops and entertainments, and by the 1950s it was seen as tawdry and outdated, and the Council began discussing what to do with the site.

In the 1950s, US based hotels such as Hilton and the Pan Am owned InterContinental created the first international hotel chains, bringing US-style modernity to cities around the world. With the increasing use of faster jet aircraft, the concept of international travel as a glamorous activity for both tourism and business purposes developed through the late 1950s and early 1960s.

In 1956, a vice-president of Pan Am visited Melbourne to explore the prospect of opening a hotel, and began negotiations with the Council over the Eastern Market site. A deal was eventually arranged in which a local consortium in partnership with InterContinental would build the hotel, leasing the land from the Council for 99 years, while InterContinental would provide management. In 1960, the Los Angeles architects Welton Becket & Associates, in partnership with local architects Leslie M. Perrott & Partners, were chosen, and demolition of the market commenced that year.

Billed as luxury hotel costing £5,250,000, that provided "comfort and service without equal", the completed building was opened by the Australian Prime Minister Robert Menzies on 14 August 1962, live on television.

The Southern Cross was an immediate success, attracting the growing international 'jet set', and hosting most world-famous visitors to Melbourne in the following decades such as the Beatles, Judy Garland, Rock Hudson, David Cassidy, John Wayne, Marlene Dietrich, Prince Charles of Wales and Princess Diana of Wales.

The hotel is best known for hosting The Beatles on the Melbourne leg of their Australian tour in 1964. 'Beatlemania' reached a fever pitch in Melbourne, and huge crowds blocked traffic outside the hotel, and fainting girls had to be treated on the street. When they left, their bed sheets were torn up and sold for charity. In Beatle lore, their stay is important since it was the only hotel to host five of the Beatles at one time. (Jimmy Nicol was hired as a temporary drummer for an ill Ringo Starr).

The Southern Cross remained the most glamorous place to stay through the 60s and 70s, and the large ballroom hosted many important events, including such nationally significant events as the Logies, the Brownlows, and Liberal Party Federal election-night functions.

In 1977, with Pam Am in debt, Intercontinental sold their stake to Australian owners, and ceased to manage the hotel. With the opening of more, large luxury hotels beginning with the Hilton in East Melbourne in 1974, then the Grand Hyatt in nearby Collins Street in 1988, and Sheraton Towers Southgate in 1992, the Southern Cross lost its premier position. The attached shopping court had never been particularly popular and by the 1980s was considered a planning failure. In the early 1990s, having already lost many of the 'themed' rooms, another refurbishment removed more of its remaining original character, the most dramatic change being beige paint over the blue tiled exterior.

It was sold to the Republic of Nauru in 1994, who then closed it on 1 April 1995 pending a large scale redevelopment that would have retained hotel tower with aesthetic enhancements. The proposed redevelopment of the Southern Cross Hotel included significant upgrades to guest accommodation, restaurants, a grand mezzanine and lobby, with numerous ballrooms and exhibition spaces. The redevelopment was expected to meet or exceed $175 million to cover both the construction of a larger residential tower consisting of serviced apartments and the hotel redevelopment.

After a failed appeal for State heritage listing by the National Trust of Victoria, the shopping court was demolished. In late 1996, the financial position of the Nauruan Government and its real-estate holdings had become public. The small island state had suffered from decades of financial mismanagement, squandering a fortune in excess of $1.5 billion to complete bankruptcy. These financial woes, combined with significant cost blowouts and delays, resulted in Nauru abandoning the redevelopment (amongst numerous other projects and properties in Melbourne and Sydney). The project never proceeded any further, and the abandoned tower stood derelict until finally being completely demolished in 2003, to make way for a new office development. It has been replaced by the large Southern Cross Tower designed by Woods Bagot.

== Features ==
Located on a two-and-a-quarter-acre site, the Southern Cross Hotel was a large project that included not just the hotel itself but a shopping plaza adjacent along Bourke Street, in an attempt to provide all the facilities a hotel guest might require in a single development. The 11 level tower of the 435-room hotel faced Exhibition Street, above a lobby and bars and restaurants in the fully glazed ground and first floors. The double level plaza behind covered a larger area, had a long front along Bourke Street, and was wrapped around an internal square courtyard, with a central fountain. The plaza contained more associated bars and restaurants, and another 40 or so shops, as well a bowling alley on the upper level. The Southern Cross Ballroom, with a seating capacity of 500, sat on top of the south side of the plaza building, and was accessed from the main lobby. There were a total of ten bars, restaurants and function rooms within the hotel and the plaza, and the range of shops included such necessities as a pharmacy, hairdresser, beauty parlour, tobacconists, car rental, travel agents, banks, as well as fashion boutiques and gift shops. A large 350 space carpark in the basement served both guests and public (guests could park free of charge when it first opened). The shopping plaza was designed on a broad horizontal base, setback from the marked slope of Bourke and Little Collins Streets (this created a break in the continuity of the shopfronts along Bourke Street, eventually affecting its popularity and viability).

The 435 bedrooms were double rooms available at single or double tariffs. They were decorated in seven different colour schemes, all of them modern and striking. All rooms were air-conditioned, with each guest permitted to regulate individual temperatures, as well as Radio, TV, and piped music being available in every room, all unusual features at the time. The rooms were available originally for £4 a day.

== Architectural style ==
The Mid-century modern style exterior was decorative and colourful, featuring a flattened hexagonal pattern on the bold horizontals of the podium of the hotel and the shopping block, zig-zag edges to the base and top of the tower block, and most strikingly, bright blue spandrel panels on the tower that used mosaic tiles in twenty-three different shades.

A large illuminated rooftop "Southern Cross" sign was attached to the front and back of the two-storey screen wall that hid the services on the roof.

=== Interiors ===
International chain hotels built in that period around the world were often boldly Modernist, but featured art, decor or rooms with 'national' references. In the case of the Southern Cross, not only was the name a local reference, but some of the interiors reflected the still mostly Victorian-era city of Melbourne. The Mayfair Room featured cast-iron lace style filigree arched wall sections and gas-lamp style light fittings, the Coolibah Restaurant featured illuminated aboriginal-style shields and timber panelling, and at plaza level The Tavern featured ornate carved blackwood bars and room dividers with leadlight and etched glass panels like an old English pub.

=== Critiques ===
The decorative design was not well received by the architectural establishment when it opened, and by the end of its life it was widely seen as 'kitsch'. The use of purely decorative elements was exactly the kind of 'featurism' that influential local architect and critic Robin Boyd had consistently derided, especially in his 1960 publication The Australian Ugliness (though he never specifically criticised the Southern Cross). Most architects in Victoria in the 50s and 60s had similar views, and the Southern Cross remained the most prominent 'featurist' building in Melbourne.

By the 1990s, the style of the hotel was widely considered to be in "bad taste." Writing about it in the early 1990s, Architectural Historian Miles Lewis described it as "garish, featuristic, and American". However, The National Trust (Victoria) published an article in 1994 in defence of its importance, when they unsuccessfully attempted to have the building heritage listed.

== Directory of Shops ==
Shop Number	Name	Location	Service
	The Mayfair Restaurant	Lobby	Gourmet Restaurant
	The Coolibah Restaurant (Renamed the Palm Court Restaurant in 1990s)	Lobby	Australian Restaurant
	The Club Grill (Awarded Michelin Star Status and Winner of Chaine des Rotisseurs)	Lobby	Rotisserie Restaurant
	The Ice Cream Parlour		1890s reproduction Ice Cream Parlour
	The Tavern	Lobby	Tavern
	Public Bar	Corner of Exhibition and Little Collins Streets	Bar
	The Pub		Sporting Bar
	The Wilawa		Cocktail Bar
6	Tasmanian Tourist Bureau	Upper Plaza	Tourist Bureau
7	Dunklings	Upper Plaza	Jeweller
8	Goya Fashions	Upper Plaza	Fashions
9	Qantas	Upper Plaza	Airline
10	Southern Cross Pharmacy	Upper Plaza	Pharmacies
12	Ronson Sales & Service	Upper Plaza	Repair Centre
16	Ansett/ANA	Upper Plaza	Airline
17	National of A.Asia Ltd.	Upper Plaza	Bank
18–21	National Cash Register	Upper Plaza	Electric Computers
22–31	Southern Cross Bowl	Upper Plaza	Bowling
28	Magic Chef	Upper Plaza	Snacks
32	Chelmer Diagnostic Clinic	Upper Plaza	Medical
28	Magic Chef	Upper Plaza	Snacks
34	Peter E. & Ewart F. Norris	Upper Plaza	Solicitors
35	Austin-Anderson (Aust.) Pty. Ltd.	Upper Plaza	Engineers
36	Mayfair Colour Centre	Upper Plaza	Decorators
37	Coleman Portraits	Upper Plaza	Photographers
39	Cyclax Beauty Salon	Upper Plaza	Beauty Salon
2	Southern Cross Bottle Shop	Lower Plaza	Liquor
3–4	Arthur McKnight	Lower Plaza	Liquor
5	Somic Handbags	Lower Plaza	Handbags
6	WD & HO Wills	Lower Plaza	Cigarette & Tobacco Manufacturers
7	Chiropractic Clinic	Lower Plaza	Chiropractors
8	Consolidated Home Industries	Lower Plaza	Builders and Contractors
9	Fine Line Photography & Classic Car Hire	Lower Plaza	Photographer & Car Hire
10	Casa Pepe	Lower Plaza	Gifts
12	Casbah Pottery	Lower Plaza	Gifts
12	Goya Casuals	Lower Plaza	Fashions
13	François Kramer	Lower Plaza	Hairdressers
14	City Girl	Lower Plaza	Fashions
15–16	Chesters Menswear	Lower Plaza	Menswear
17–18	Camille Fashions	Lower Plaza	Fashions
19	Dorn Studios	Lower Plaza	Photographers
19	Australian Gift Shop	Lower Plaza	Gifts
20	Southern Cross Lingerie	Lower Plaza	Lingerie
21–22	ANZ Bank	Lower Plaza	Bank
21	3AW	Lower Plaza	Radio
23–24	Parlorcars	Lower Plaza	Couch Tours
26	Newmans Chocolates	Lower Plaza	Chocolates
27	American Chamber of Commerce	Lower Plaza	Commerce
28	Southern Cross Theatre Bookings	Lower Plaza	Theatre Bookings
29–30	Tam the Cheap Grocer	Lower Plaza	Groceries
31a	Adam Ties	Lower Plaza	Menswear
32a	Toy Cave	Southern Cross Theatre Bookings	Children's Toys
32b	Clothes Horse	Lower Plaza	Menswear
33	Isa Johnstone	Lower Plaza	Gifts
34	U-Rect-It	Lower Plaza	Shopfitter
35	Totalizator Agency Board	Lower Plaza	Betting
36	World Fair Promotion	Lower Plaza	Promotion
37	New Chinese Products	Lower Plaza	Gifts
38	Intercontinental Pharmacy	Lower Plaza	Pharmacies
39	Scholl Foot Service	Lower Plaza	Chiropody
40	Forum	Lower Plaza	Gifts
41	Boutique Forty One	Lower Plaza	Fashions
42	Southern Cross Water Sports	Lower Plaza	Sporting Equipment
43	Sophia's Reptile Gifts	Lower Plaza	Handbags
44	Pamamulls	Main Lobby	Jewellers
5	Kays	Main Lobby	Car Rental
5a	Collins Book Depot	Main Lobby	Books
	Exclusive Limousines	Main Lobby	Private Car Services
1	William Grau	Mezzanine	Hairdressers

== Gallery ==
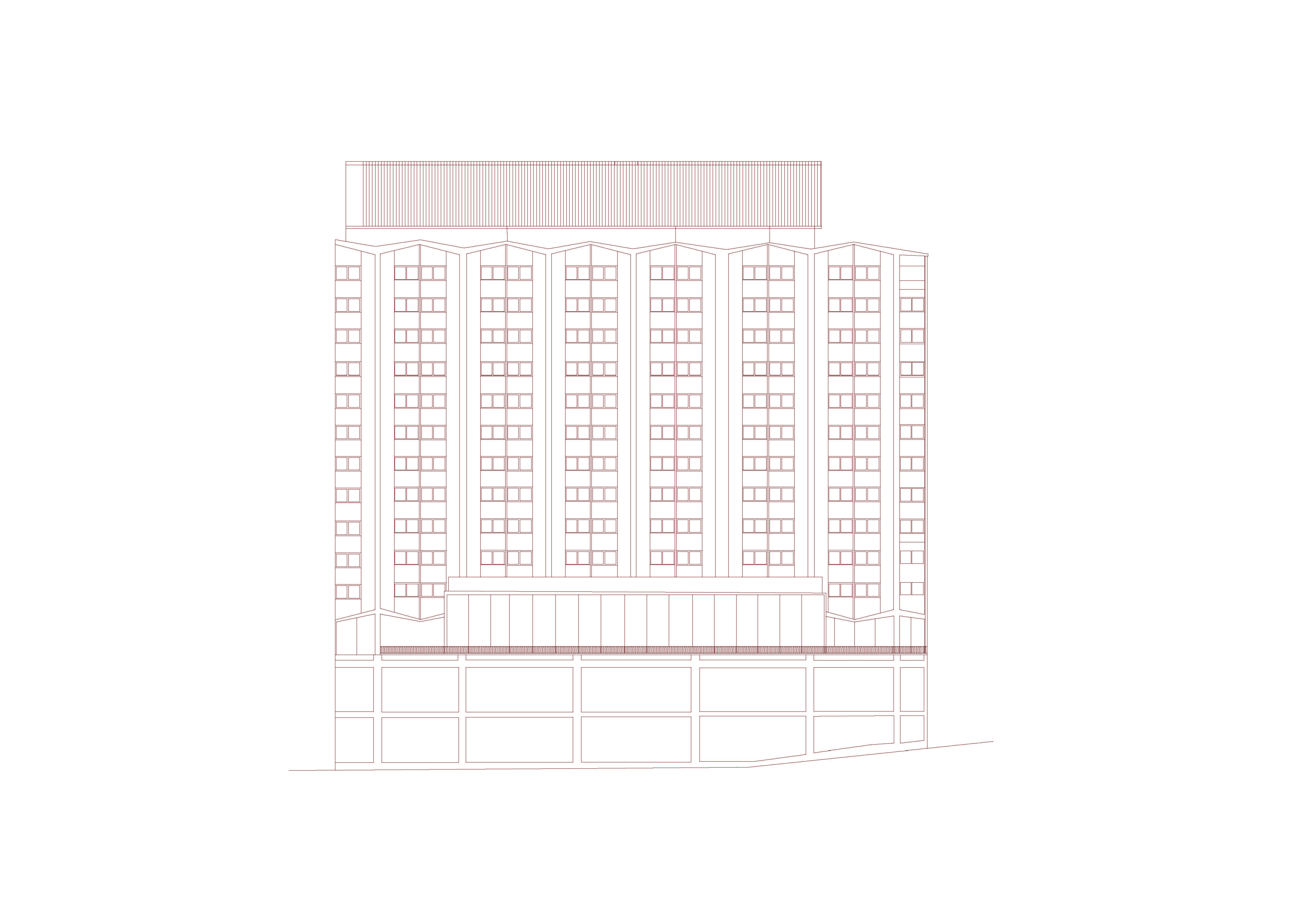
Elevation

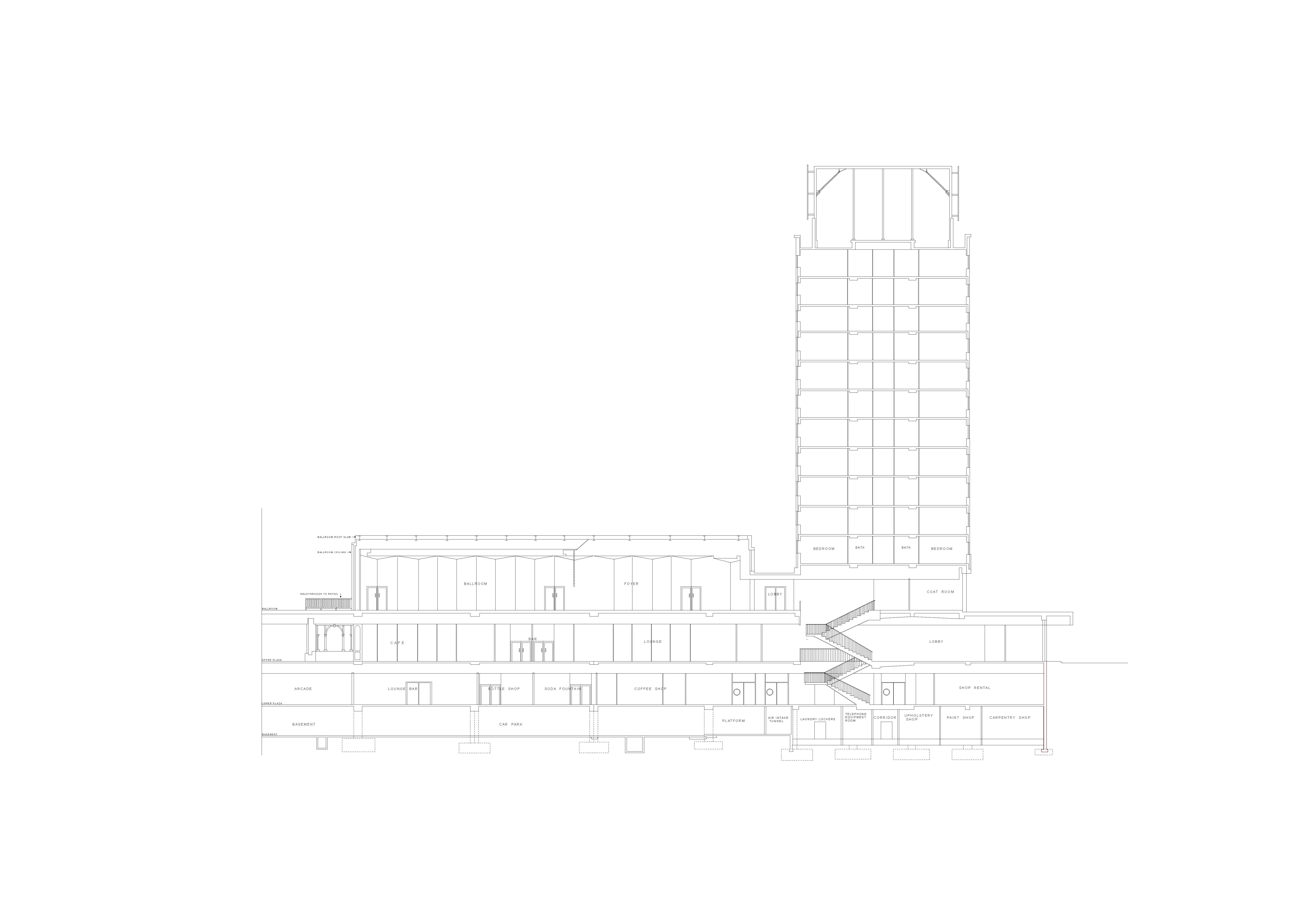
Section

== See also ==
- Southern Cross Tower
