= Anne Wills =

Australian television and radio presenter

Anne Wills OAM
- Born: 3 October 1944 (age 81); Wangaratta, Victoria, Australia
- Other name: Willsy
- Occupations: Television personality/presenter, weather presenter, radio presenter
- Years active: 1964–present
- Employer: Nine Network
- Spouses: Graham Smith (m. 1969; div. 1973) Michael Fenwick (m. 1976; died 1980) Peter Robinson (m. 1988; div. 1994)

Anne Shirley Wills OAM (born 3 October 1944) is an Australian television and radio personality based in Adelaide. Wills holds the record for the most number of Logies won by a person in the history of the awards, winning 19 Most Popular State Personality Logies, and one as producer of Clapperboard.

== Background ==
Wills was born in Wangaratta, Victoria in October 1944. When she was three years old, her family moved to Ocean Island in the Pacific Ocean, now known as Banaba Island and part of Kiribati, and lived there until the family moved to Adelaide in 1963.

== Career ==
Wills was spotted by Channel 9 executives during the 1964 Telethon Quest, and was offered the job of weather girl on NWS9, beginning in July 1965.

As well as appearing on a number of national television programs such as In Melbourne Tonight, Beauty and the Beast, The Bert Newton Show and Good Morning Australia, Wills has presented and appeared on many Adelaide based TV programs, including Adelaide Tonight, The Penthouse Club, AM Adelaide, Movie Scene, Christmas Telethon, Pot Luck and Close Up with Willsy. She was also the weather presenter for SAS for a number of years and, as of November 2013, has a regular weekly afternoon segment on Adelaide AM radio station FiveAA, featuring celebrity gossip.

Wills is known for her love of over-the-top earrings. Wills also commonly appears in pub quiz nights

== Recordings ==
Wills recorded an album Colour My World which was released on Graham Morphett's Adelaide-based Raven label (cat. RNLP 084) which was a subsidiary of the Nationwide label in 1972. It didn't get a great amount of attention.

=== Awards and recognition ===
Year	Award	Category
1968	TV Week Logie Award	South Australia: Best Female Personality
1969	TV Week Logie Award	South Australia: Best Female Personality
1970	TV Week Logie Award	South Australia: Best Female Personality
1971	TV Week Logie Award	South Australia: Most Popular Female
1972	TV Week Logie Award	South Australia: Most Popular Female
1973	TV Week Logie Award	South Australia: Most Popular Female
1974	TV Week Logie Award	South Australia: Most Popular Female
1975	TV Week Logie Award	South Australia: Most Popular Female
1981	TV Week Logie Award	South Australia: Most Popular Female
1981	TV Week Logie Award	South Australia: Most Popular Show
1982	TV Week Logie Award	South Australia: Most Popular Female
1983	TV Week Logie Award	South Australia: Most Popular Female
2018	Medal of the Order of Australia	South Australia: For services to broadcasting (2018 Queen's Birthday Honours)
