= Packed to the Rafters season 1 =

Season of television series

Packed to the Rafters
- Season 1
- Season 1 DVD
- No. of episodes: 22

Release
- Original network: Seven Network
- Original release: 26 August 2008 – 24 March 2009

Season chronology
- Next → Season 2

The first season of Packed to the Rafters, an Australian drama television series, began airing on 26 August 2008 on the Seven Network and concluded on 24 March 2009 after 22 episodes. The first season aired Tuesdays at 8:30 pm in Australia and averaged 1,904,364 viewers. It was released on DVD as a six disc set under the title of Packed to the Rafters: The Complete Season 1 on 2 December 2009.

The first season begins as Julie and Dave Rafter are over the moon when their last remaining child finally leaves home. But what happens when the rest of the family suddenly returns to the nest? Less than 48 hours after their middle son Ben moves himself next door, all dreams of freedom are put on hold as one by one their youngest son Nathan and his princess wife Sammy, their troubled eldest daughter Rachel, and Julie's emotionally vulnerable father Ted all return to the family home. Plenty of drama, many laughs and a few tears ensue as the Rafters must learn to live under the same roof once again.

== Cast ==
=== Regular ===
- Rebecca Gibney as Julie Rafter
- Erik Thomson as Dave Rafter
- Jessica Marais as Rachel Rafter
- Angus McLaren as Nathan Rafter
- Hugh Sheridan as Ben Rafter
- Jessica McNamee as Sammy Rafter
- Michael Caton as Ted Taylor

=== Recurring and guest ===
- George Houvardas as Nick "Carbo" Karandonis
- Zoe Ventoura as Melissa Bannon
- Caroline Brazier as Chrissy Merchant
- Justin Rosniak as Stuart "Warney" Warne
- Luke Pegler as Daniel Griggs
- Sarah Chadwick as Trish Westaway
- Jerome Ehlers as Anthony Westaway
- Kate Fitzpatrick as Marjorie Stevens
- George Spartels as Theo Karandonis
- Dina Panozzo as Rita Karandonis
- Roy Billing as Ron Barrett
- Belinda Bromilow as Libby Sanders
- Craig McLachlan as Steve Wilson
- Michael Booth as George Spiteri

== Episodes ==
No. overall	No. in season	Title	Narrator	Directed by	Written by	Original release date	Australian viewers (millions)
1	1	"Packed to the Rafters"	Julie Rafter	Chris Martin-Jones	Anthony Ellis	26 August 2008	1.945
Happily married couple, Julie and Dave Rafter are over the moon when Ben, their second child, finally decides to leave home. After raising three kids, the couple are free! It's a chance for them to do what they want, when they want and on their own terms. However, less than 48 hours after Ben moves next door, all dreams of freedom are completely upended – their three kids think being with their parents is a lot more comfortable than being out on their own, and they're returning with the same sure instinct of homing pigeons.
2	2	"Playing a Googly"	Dave Rafter	Chris Martin-Jones	Anthony Ellis	2 September 2008	2.045
An unemployed Dave struggles to regain his manhood and position in the family, landing himself in hospital. When life keeps bowling Dave a series of problematic googlies, the question becomes: how will he play them? An overprotective Dave breaks a promise to his daughter and is brutally attacked. Rachel struggles with the aftermath of leaving her abusive boyfriend Daniel and her own secret turmoil.
3	3	"She Ain't Heavy"	Ben Rafter	Pino Amenta	Marieke Hardy	9 September 2008	1.960
Rachel's growing alcohol dependence sends her family over the edge. Her careless actions could spell the end for one of them. Julie desperately brings the family together for a therapeutic barbecue but simmering tensions erupt. Ben finds himself the unlikely counsellor to both his sister and grandfather Ted as they confront traumatic turning points in their lives. When Ted's humiliating secret is discovered by Rachel, she unwittingly sets him on a path to self-destruction.
4	4	"How Did We Get Here?"	Nathan Rafter	Pino Amenta	Margaret Wilson	16 September 2008	1.895
Sammy and Nathan's marriage is in crisis when she can no longer bear keeping the secret reason for their move into the Rafter home. This leaves Nathan with no option but to count on the family he's always taken for granted. Relating the story of how he met beloved wife Sammy, Nathan is forced to face his feelings of worthlessness as a son, husband and provider. In revisiting the evolution of his relationship with Sammy, Nathan takes us to his wedding day, which happened to turn out to be both the happiest and saddest day of his life, as a beloved family member collapses. Wealthy princess Sammy faces obstacles at every turn as she struggles to fit into crowded, suburban life with the Rafter family.
5	5	"Lines of Communication"	Julie Rafter	Lynn Hegarty	Anthony Ellis	23 September 2008	1.945
Dave's freelance working career does not begin well at all and fails to take off. This has Julie feeling the financial strain of her family coming back to live with her and Dave. Julie makes some tough decisions which tests the strength of her marriage and she tells Dave a white lie which she later regrets terribly. As Dave struggles to find work, he decides to buy a new van without telling Julie and tempers in the Rafter household flare. All this while Ben keeps mum on a very uncomfortable secret that has the potential to blow his family apart.
6	6	"Facing Demons"	Rachel Rafter	Lynn Hegarty	Marieke Hardy	30 September 2008	1.836
This episode is told from the perspective of Rachel, the eldest child of the Rafter family. Flashbacks are shown which explains how Rachel met, fell in love with and consequently left Daniel, followed by the aftermath of her and Daniel's sex video scandal and the effect that it has had on the whole Rafter family. Meanwhile, Ted decides to move back home, but it is not long before Julie realises he may be hiding something.
7	7	"Self-Made Man"	Nathan Rafter	Pino Amenta	Margaret Wilson	7 October 2008	1.979
Nathan's world is turned upside down as Julie and Dave make a splash at his father-in-law's 50th birthday party. Nathan learns a valuable lesson about wealth and happiness when the life he has and the life he wants collide. Determined to teach Nathan a lesson about family loyalty, Rachel sets out to humiliate him by dating his rich and snobby best friend.
8	8	"Taking the Lead"	Ben Rafter	Lynn-Maree Danzey	Marieke Hardy	14 October 2008	1.886
Ben's world is turned upside down after a drunken one-night stand. Dave must face up to the secrets of his past. Carbo strikes up a surprising friendship, with unexpectedly romantic results.
9	9	"Suburban Boy"	Dave Rafter	Pino Amenta	Dave Warner	21 October 2008	1.868
Dave reconnects with his foster brother, 1980s rock star Steve Wilson – leading to an offer he can't refuse. Meanwhile, after a risky gamble with his boss's money, Nathan races the clock to save his job. And Carbo declares his feelings for Chrissy – but will she return them?
10	10	"All in the Planning"	Rachel Rafter	Lynn-Maree Danzey	Margaret Wilson	28 October 2008	1.926
Ben gets the wrong idea when he stumbles upon a secret inside Melissa's handbag. Sammy is offered the possibility of a glamorous job in London, but this opportunity may cause her to leave Nathan behind. Meanwhile, Rachel is faced with a terrible decision.
11	11	"Away from It All"	Julie Rafter	Lynn Hegarty	Anthony Ellis	4 November 2008	2.067
Julie forces her dispirited family to the beach for a restorative weekend away – leading to everyone feeling restored but Julie herself. Ted receives advice from beyond the grave. Melissa's life is in danger when she goes into sudden anaphylactic shock during a Rafter BBQ. Romance beckons for Rachel, but she is not sure if she is ready to embrace it.
12	12	"Removing the Block"	Ted Taylor	Lynn Hegarty	Anthony Ellis	11 November 2008	1.959
It's Christmas Time as Ted steps back into the weird and wonderful world of dating. His journey begins when, encouraged by Louise's letter to the future, he attends a meeting of Friend Finders – a social networking group for people over 50. His first experience is bewildering and he finds himself cast as 'fresh flesh' — especially by two very different women, Helen and Marjorie. But the newly widowed Ted is not sure if he ready just yet for anything romantic. Meanwhile, Dave tries to implement a household roster, Rachel embraces a macrobiotic lifestyle with disastrous results, Julie lets her hair down for a night of pre-Christmas clubbing and then the family spend a happy Christmas Day together.
13	13	"Smile Through the Pain"	Dave Rafter	Chris Martin-Jones	Margaret Wilson	18 November 2008	2.013
Dave's birthday celebrations end in disaster after a fight breaks out in a pole-dancing club. Forced to take on extra work to pay some unexpected bills, Dave reluctantly bonds with Warney, and discovers the beginnings of a surprising friendship. Rachel is still on her health kick after previous disastrous results between the plumbing and her macrobiotic cooking, and decides to enrol in a yoga class. Julie also decides that yoga sounds like a great idea, and along with Chrissy, enrols in the same class as Rachel only to end up cramping her style. Meanwhile, Ben is traumatised after a violent hold-up at the Boat Club.
14	14	"A Mother's Radar"	Julie Rafter	Chris Martin-Jones	Margaret Wilson	25 November 2008	1.824
Julie struggles with the realisation that her 'mother's radar' is not always exact when it comes to her children's problems. Rachel is trying to keep her relationship with Vishnu, her hot yoga teacher, a secret from the family, but Julie's predictions about Rachel's true desire to pursue an interest in yoga are proven correct when her relationship is exposed. Meanwhile, following on from their adventure in the car and desperate for some more time to themselves, Nathan and Sammy organise a romantic tryst at one of the properties Nathan is meant to be selling. Tensions then rise when Sammy's successful ex boyfriend returns to Sydney. Meanwhile, Julie knows that Dave is keeping a secret, but is shocked when he reveals to her that he is starting to consider Warney as a friend.
15	15	"Natural Justice"	Julie Rafter	Nicholas Bufalo	Sue Hore	3 February 2009	1.874
While attending jury duty, Ben meets Kat, a massage therapist who soon becomes his new housemate. Melissa suspects something sinister about Kat while Carbo's excited that there's a new girl in the house. Dave offers his son Nathan a job at his electrical business after he was fired from his job in real-estate, causing Julie to be thrilled at the prospect of having her son and husband work together. Meanwhile, Rachel struggles to get over Vishnu's betrayal.
16	16	"Having It All"	Rachel Rafter	Nicholas Bufalo	Marieke Hardy	10 February 2009	1.688
Looking for direction and focus, Rachel throws herself into a new chapter in her life. This includes not only a rather confronting and embarrassing night of speed-dating, but also the nerve-wracking experience of applying for a job far above her level of experience. Rachel's run of daring open-mindedness takes a blessed turn when she – literally – runs into an attractive and intelligent, but much older man, Rob. Meanwhile, Dave's struggling with son Nathan as his new manager. With Nathan throwing his weight around, and Warney looking to Nathan as the boss, tempers begin to flare.
17	17	"Changes"	Ted Taylor	Lynn Hegarty	Dave Warner	17 February 2009	1.740
Dave sees red when he learns that the man Rachel is dating is an old cricket friend from many years ago. He remembers Rob as a tireless lothario, so he takes matters into his own hands by paying a visit to Rob's bookshop to warn him off his daughter. Julie is very much on Rachel's side, until she discovers that Rob is now a divorced father of two teenage boys. Meanwhile, Melissa and Chrissy are still suspicious of new housemate Kat and Ted ventures into the world of dating by means of two-timing.
18	18	"House of Cards"	Ben Rafter	Marcus Cole	Abe Pogos	24 February 2009	1.833
After another drunken one-night stand, Ben faces a gut-wrenching dilemma. Meanwhile, Dave is keen to spice up his marriage and organises a rendezvous with Julie. Also, Sammy and Nathan's relationship becomes strained when he discovers she's lied to him.
19	19	"Over the Moon"	Dave Rafter	Marcus Cole	Chris Hawkshaw	3 March 2009	1.876
Ben challenges fate to grant him one last chance to redeem himself. Julie reaches some startling conclusions about the state of her health. And Rob is scarily keen to play happy families with Rachel.
20	20	"Losing the Touch"	Julie Rafter	Lynn Hegarty	Abe Pogos	10 March 2009	1.817
Julie fears that as she heads into menopause, she is losing the 'mojo' that has always enabled her to dispense sound wisdom to her family and friends. Meanwhile, Ben resolves to declare his love for Melissa on national television, with tragically funny results.
21	21	"What a Difference a Year Makes"	Nathan Rafter	Chris Martin-Jones	Margaret Wilson	17 March 2009	1.887
Julie is left shell-shocked after a visit to her doctor yields a disturbing diagnosis. Meanwhile, the Rafters reflect in their various ways the anniversary of Louise Taylor's tragic death and the wedding of currently-estranged Nathan and Sammy. In the final minute, Julie shocks her family by revealing she is pregnant.
22	22	"Don't Know What You've Got Till It's Gone"	Julie Rafter	Chris Martin-Jones	Anthony Ellis	24 March 2009	2.033
Julie and Dave wrestle with a life-changing decision that will shake the foundation of the family. Rachel reveals a painful secret from her past. And Ben fears the worst when Melissa's ex-fiancé turns up on his doorstep.

== Reception ==
=== Ratings ===
Episode	Title	Original airdate	Viewers^{1}	Nightly Rank	Weekly Rank
1; 1-01	"Pilot"	26 August 2008	1,945,000	1	2
2; 1-02	"Playing a Googly"	2 September 2008	2,045,000	1	1
3; 1-03	"She Ain't Heavy"	9 September 2008	1,960,000	1	1
4; 1-04	"How Did We Get Here?"	16 September 2008	1,895,000	1	1
5; 1-05	"Lines of Communication"	23 September 2008	1,945,000	1	5
6; 1-06	"Facing Demons"	30 September 2008	1,836,000	1	1
7; 1-07	"Self-made Man"	7 October 2008	1,979,000	1	2
8; 1-08	"Taking the Lead"	14 October 2008	1,886,000	1	1
9; 1-09	"Suburban Boy"	21 October 2008	1,868,000	1	1
10; 1–10	"All in the Planning"	28 October 2008	1,926,000	1	1
11; 1–11	"Away from It All"	4 November 2008	2,067,000	1	2
12; 1–12	"Removing the Block"	11 November 2008	1,959,000	1	1
13; 1–13	"Smile Through the Pain"	18 November 2008	2,013,000	1	1
14; 1–14	"A Mother's Radar"	25 November 2008	1,824,000	1	1
15; 1–15	"Natural Justice"	3 February 2009	1,874,000	1	3
16; 1–16	"Having It All"	10 February 2009	1,688,000	1	7
17; 1–17	"Changes"	17 February 2009	1,740,000	1	2
18; 1–18	"House of Cards"	24 February 2009	1,833,000	1	2
19; 1–19	"Over the Moon"	3 March 2009	1,876,000	1	2
20; 1–20	"Losing the Touch"	10 March 2009	1,817,000	1	2
21; 1–21	"What a Difference a Year Makes"	17 March 2009	1,887,000	1	2
22; 1–22	"Don't Know What You've Got Till It's Gone"	24 March 2009	2,033,000	1	2

^{1} Viewer numbers are based on preliminary OzTAM data for Sydney, Melbourne, Brisbane, Adelaide and Perth combined.
