= Packed to the Rafters season 2 =

Season of television series

Packed to the Rafters
- Season 2
- Season 2 DVD
- No. of episodes: 22

Release
- Original network: Seven Network
- Original release: 30 June – 24 November 2009

Season chronology
- ← Previous; Season 1 Next → Season 3

The second season of Packed to the Rafters, an Australian drama television series, began airing on 30 June 2009 on the Seven Network. The season concluded on 24 November 2009 after 22 episodes. The second season aired Tuesdays at 8:30 pm in Australia and averaged 1,881,000 viewers. The season was released on DVD as a six disc set under the title of Packed to the Rafters: The Complete Season 2 on 3 November 2010.

The second season follows Julie and Dave Rafter through highs and lows as they prepare for their unplanned but welcomed new baby. Dave's birth mother, Chel, is introduced as well. Rachel embarks on a promising if-at-first feisty relationship with the young electrician who's begun working with her dad. Ben continues his determined pursuit of housemate Melissa's hand in marriage. Nathan struggles to resist strong temptations that may signal the end of his marriage while seeking a career in the music industry.

== Cast ==
=== Regular ===
- Rebecca Gibney as Julie Rafter
- Erik Thomson as Dave Rafter
- Jessica Marais as Rachel Rafter
- Angus McLaren as Nathan Rafter
- Hugh Sheridan as Benjamin "Ben" Rafter
- Jessica McNamee as Samantha "Sammy" Rafter
- Michael Caton as Ted Taylor

=== Recurring and guest ===
- George Houvardas as Carbo Karandonis
- Zoe Ventoura as Melissa Bannon
- James Stewart as Jake Barton
- Caroline Brazier as Chrissy Merchant
- Justin Rosniak as Stuart "Warney" Warne
- Luke Pegler as Daniel Griggs
- Sarah Chadwick as Trish Westaway
- Kate Fitzpatrick as Marjorie Stevens
- George Spartels as Theo Karandonis
- Dina Panozzo as Rita Karandonis
- Belinda Bromilow as Libby Sanders
- Craig McLachlan as Steve Wilson
- Michael Booth as George Spiteri
- Ria Vandervis as Layla Soubrani
- Geoff Morrell as Tim Connelly
- Peter Bensley as Derek
- Christian Barratt-Hill as Don Barrett
- Pedro Virgil as Dane
- Gillian Jones as Rachel "Chel" Warne
- Sophia Katos as Artie
- Hannah and Sebella Storey as Ruby Rafter
- Mercia Deane-Johns as Grace Barton
- Kristian Schmid as Alex Barton
- Denise Roberts as Bonnie Bright
- Phoebe Tonkin as Lexi
- Kim Lewis as Toni (The older woman)

== Episodes ==
No. overall	No. in season	Title	Narrator	Directed by	Written by	Original release date	Australian viewers (millions)
23	1	"Look into My Eyes"	Julie Rafter	Pino Amenta	Marieke Hardy	30 June 2009	2.185
This episode sees the return of Packed to the Rafters for its second season on Australian television. Decisions still need to be made from where they left off at the end of Season One. And Ben and Mel may or may not have a relationship. In this episode we see Julie once again worried about the safety of her family. It seems she visits a psychic and some very troubling forecasts about the future of the Rafter family are made. Now normally this would not bother Julie, but as each of these predictions come true, Julie becomes increasingly concerned.
24	2	"Dodging the Issue"	Dave Rafter	Pino Amenta	Abe Pogos	7 July 2009	1.851
Ben has what is believed to be a heart attack when he tried to win Mel. Nathan gets a job offer leaving Dave to feel somewhat abandoned and betrayed and Julie thinks that Warney is ripping off Dave's business.
25	3	"Living by the List"	Rachel Rafter	Lynn Hegarty	Margaret Wilson	14 July 2009	1.794
Rachel is dating again but none of the dates Libby set up have really gone to plan because her date doesn't fit her perfect man but she does meet Jake and they do not start off the best. Ben is trying to get the job as manager of the boat club but he has some competition, so for his night running the place he has a quiz night which does not go exactly to plan. Meanwhile Nathan is not really happy with his new job.
26	4	"Glittering Prizes"	Nathan Rafter	Lynn Hegarty	Anthony Ellis	21 July 2009	1.857
Once again Nathan is at a crossroads in his life. This week he is given the choice of a career in real estate or the music industry. It seems as though his property deal is going to pan out and his boss Tim is incredibly impressed. So much so that he hints of a future partnership in the real estate business. But just at the same time, Dave's close friend and ex fellow band member Steve Wilson returns from his latest tour to announce that he is starting a new business venture and asks Nathan to join him. Dave and Sammy are unsure of Nathan's job security in the music industry and try to help him decide which one holds the best promise for his future. Meanwhile the relationship between Rachel and Jake becomes more and more flirtatious. It seems as though Jake loves to tease Rachel and appreciates just how much Rachel is disturbed by it all. Does Jake hope it leads to a more positive relationship? And Ben and Mel? Ben loves her for sure, but just how does Mel feel? Does Ben take the chance and risk it all by issuing Mel the "break or make" ultimatum?
27	5	"Brave New World"	Dave Rafter	Cherie Nowlan	Chris Hawkshaw	28 July 2009	1.926
Falling pregnant later in life carries many risks, one of which is Down syndrome. Following doctor Marsh's advice, Julie decides to undergo an ultrasound and learns that her chances of having a child with Down syndrome are even higher than normal. The next step is to complete a barrage of blood tests and anxiously await the results. But of course while Dave and Julie are waiting for the blood test results they must discuss the possibility of raising a child with disabilities. As far as Julie is concerned, either way, they are keeping this baby, but Dave has reservations about his ability to raise a child with disabilities. Meanwhile Carbo's flower shop is going well and bringing some surprising benefits.
28	6	"Little Arrows"	Ted Taylor	Cherie Nowlan	Dave Warner	4 August 2009	1.880
Ted's burgeoning relationship with Marjorie appears to be going romantic gangbusters until he meets her daughter Susannah and her pregnant partner Abby, who've left the Gold Coast to live with her.
29	7	"Belonging"	Sammy Rafter	Pino Amenta	Margaret Wilson	11 August 2009	1.909
Sammy thinks about where she can fit into the Rafter family after she becomes homeless following her mother's breakdown. Rachel tries to ignore her attraction to Jake after the romantic night they spent together.
30	8	"What's in a Name?"	Julie Rafter	Pino Amenta	Margaret Wilson	18 August 2009	1.894
A stray dog stirs up long-buried nightmares from Dave's childhood. A week into Trish's stay in the Rafter house, Julie pleads with her boss Don to give Trish a job. He agrees, but the plan backfires when Trish spends more time flirting with Don than she does working. Jake is determined to show Rachel they could be in a relationship which is more than physical.
31	9	"Naked Visions"	Ben Rafter	Ian Watson	Marieke Hardy	25 August 2009	1.931
Rachel takes some artistic photographs of Julie as her body changes, but not all the family wants to see the results. Dave gets close to Ben's dog Doorknob and is distraught when he is badly injured. He later receives his birth certificate and finds out his mother's name was Rachel Warne and his father was listed as unknown. Meanwhile, Ben proposes to Mel but doesn't get the instant yes he was hoping for.
32	10	"Ready to Catch You"	Dave Rafter	Ian Watson	Jeff Truman	1 September 2009	1.943
Dave finally tells the rest of the family about this early childhood and his mother, and buoyed by their enthusiasm he goes seeking further information but is devastated when the agency reveals that his mother doesn't want to see him. However, his mother Rachel turns up at his door but leaves in tears without talking to Dave. Meanwhile, Rachel meets Jake's family – his cheeky brother Alex who has cerebral palsy and this acerbic mother Grace who takes an instant dislike to Rachel. The following day Jake has a workplace accident, and Grace tells Rachel to stay away from her son. Elsewhere, Nathan is pulled into the darker side of the music business by Layla who encourages him to celebrate with cocaine. But Sammy finds out and is incensed and makes him promise to limit his hours with Layla and never to touch cocaine again. Finally, Dave scores his century at cricket.
33	11	"Power Play"	Rachel Rafter	Kevin Carlin	Chris McCourt	8 September 2009	1.912
Rachel decides to create an electrical problem to make Dave come to the store where she works. Meanwhile, Rachel and Jake spend a romantic evening together in a hotel, however they are interrupted by a telephone call from Jake's mum Grace who tries to make Jake come home early.
34	12	"Out of Left Field"	Ben Rafter	Kevin Carlin	Abe Pogas	15 September 2009	1.806
Carbo's mother Rita comes to stay for six weeks in Australia, for her first major writing assignment, Sammy must interview two young professionals and Nathan tries to hide his guilt over a drug-fueled kiss with Layla.
35	13	"Blurring the Lines"	Nathan Rafter	Cherie Nowlan	Kris Mrksa	22 September 2009	1.766
Artie is preparing for her first day of work at the boat club with Ben. Carbo, who's aware of his romantic feelings for her, is happy with her choice of job. However he hasn't met her co-worker Lexi yet. Nathan's sudden sexual attraction for Layla spirals out of control with potentially tragic consequences. Chrissy finds herself having a surprising and unwelcome fantasy of her own, about Dave. And an unexpected romance blossoms between Warney and Trish.
36	14	"First Instinct"	Julie Rafter	Cherie Nowlan	Marieke Hardy	29 September 2009	1.697
The Rafters throw a surprise party for Dave's mum, Chel, who is swept up in the family history and moved by the love shown to her. Rachel notices bruising on Chel's arms, and tells Julie that she thinks they may be track marks. Dave overhears this discussion, and after much speculation on what the bruises could be, is determined to get to the bottom of it. After Chel is confronted by Dave, she leaves and then returns to tell the family that she has been HIV positive for 23 years. Meanwhile, Carbo works hard to fan the flames of his relationship with Artie and Melissa accepts Ben's marriage proposal.
37	15	"It's My Party"	Dave Rafter	Lynn Hegarty	Margaret Wilson	6 October 2009	1.755
Dave is determined to give Ben and Melissa the engagement party that he and Julie never had. But his focus is sidetracked by the accidental discovery that Chel's increasingly regular hospital visits are in fact to the Renal Ward. Nathan is nervous when he hears Steve Wilson is returning overseas to attend the engagement party. Having slept with Layla, Nathan is terrified that Steve, and more importantly, Sammy could find out.
38	16	"Mr Fix-It"	Ted Taylor	Lynn Hegarty	Tony Morphett	13 October 2009	1.841
Now that Julie and Dave are expecting their fourth child, Ted makes plans to withdraw from his superfund and invest in a new unit. Nathan has been calling and texting Sammy hoping for the chance to explain his infidelity. Dave has been searching for Chel since she ran from the engagement party, with no luck. She has left town with no forwarding address. Ted gallops to the rescue, persuading Melissa to find out which hospital Chel is now going to for her dialysis.
39	17	"Putting the House in Order"	Julie Rafter	Catherine Millar	Dave Warner	20 October 2009	1.701
On her last day at work Julie quizzes psychic tea lady Bonnie about the troubling prediction she'd made months earlier. Rachel spies Sammy having lunch with her ex Owen, and becomes concerned.
40	18	"Space Junk"	Rachel Rafter	Catherine Millar	Abe Pogos	27 October 2009	1.958
When a bunch of flowers arrive for her at work with no card, Rachel assumes Jake must have sent them. However, she soon discovers that they are from her ex-boyfriend, meth addict Daniel. Now clean and sober, he has been rehired by CBM Advertising to produce a TV ad for men's cologne Rampant using Jake as the star.
41	19	"A Small, Traditional Affair"	Ben Rafter	Nicholas Bufalo	Marieke Hardy	3 November 2009	2.072
At the bucks night, Ben is having a fantastic time until the stripper Carbo has organised arrives. It turns out to be Kat, the woman he slept with and who came between him and Melissa. After a confrontation Ben panics and on the morning of their wedding day and disappears. The Rafters throw themselves into finding Ben and hiding the news from Melissa.
42	20	"Only a Heartbeat Away"	Dave Rafter	Nicholas Bufalo	Jeff Truman	10 November 2009	1.853
Ben and Melissa's honeymoon takes an unexpected turn. At the five-star resort they're staying at, they meet another couple, Adrian and Nicole, and hit it off. However, there's more than meets the eye with this friendly duo. Meanwhile, Dave is very aware that Chel has been keeping her distance since the wedding. Chel insists they're fine but Dave feels like his mum is a stranger. Julie, who's under strict bed rest after her collapse on the wedding, suggests he try harder. He does by turning up in Ted's place to take Chel to her dialysis treatment. At the hospital, she opens up about his father Tom Jennings. She admits she doesn't even know where he's buried.
43	21	"Unlimited Options"	Nathan Rafter	Pino Amenta	Chris Hawkshaw	17 November 2009	1.804
Nathan makes a shocking discovery about Dave's father Tom Jennings. Meanwhile, Rachel is feeling the pressure of organising a baby shower for Julie, while Ben and Melissa try to get rid of their new housemate Warney. Note: Final appearance of Caroline Brazier as Chrissy Merchant. For the remainder of the series, her whereabouts are never explained.
44	22	"Nativity Play"	Julie Rafter	Pino Amenta	Margaret Wilson	24 November 2009	2.048
After Dave leaves for his vasectomy, Julie begins to have contractions, and though she thinks they're probably Braxton Hicks, Melissa and Ben insist on getting her to a hospital. Julie's obstetrician Sandra Marsh alerts Julie that the signs of labour have disappeared, but now that Julie is in hospital, she's not allowed to leave until she gives birth. Julie reluctantly gives in and tells Ben not to worry Dave as he will undoubtedly call them once his procedure is over. However, when she does arrive in labour, Dave panics to find where the clinic, Julie is giving birth is. Meanwhile, Jake invites Rachel to lunch with his family, which causes Jake to talk his mind. Nathan gives Sammy a cheque for $14,000, which later causes an uplifting result.

== Reception ==
The season won 3 Silver Logies in 2010.

=== Ratings ===
Episode	Title	Original airdate	Viewers^{1}	Nightly Rank	Weekly Rank
1; 2-01	"Look into My Eyes"	30 June 2009	2,185,000^{2}	5	10^{2}
2; 2-02	"Dodging the Issue"	7 July 2009	1,851,000^{3}	1	2
3; 2-03	"Living by the List"	14 July 2009	1,794,000	2	4
4; 2-04	"Glittering Prizes"	21 July 2009	1,857,000	1	3
5; 2-05	"Brave New World"	28 July 2009	1,926,000	1	2
6; 2-06	"Little Arrows"	4 August 2009	1,880,000	1	1
7; 2-07	"Belonging"	11 August 2009	1,909,000	1	1
8; 2-08	"What's in a Name?"	18 August 2009	1,894,000	1	1
9; 2-09	"Naked Visions"	25 August 2009	1,931,000	1	1
10; 2–10	"Ready to Catch You"	1 September 2009	1,943,000	1	1
11; 2–11	"Power Play"	8 September 2009	1,912,000	1	1
12; 2–12	"Out of Left Field"	15 September 2009	1,806,000	1	1
13; 2–13	"Blurring the Lines"	22 September 2009	1,766,000	1	2
14; 2–14	"First Instinct"	29 September 2009	1,697,000	1	3
15; 2–15	"It's My Party"	6 October 2009	1,755,000	1	4
16; 2–16	"Mr Fix-it"	13 October 2009	1,841,000	1	1
17; 2–17	"Putting the House in Order"	20 October 2009	1,701,000	1	1
18; 2–18	"Space Junk"	27 October 2009	1,958,000	1	1
19; 2–19	"A Small, Traditional Affair"	3 November 2009	2,072,000	2	2
20; 2–20	"Only a Heartbeat Away"	10 November 2009	1,853,000	1	1
21; 2–21	"Unlimited Options"	17 November 2009	1,804,000	1	1
22; 2–22	"Nativity Play"	24 November 2009	2,048,000	1	1

^{1} Viewer numbers are based on preliminary OzTAM data for Sydney, Melbourne, Brisbane, Adelaide and Perth combined.
^{2} Episode 1 of season 2 was aired in Sydney, Adelaide, Brisbane and Perth on 30 June to an audience of 1,520,000. Episode 1 was shown to Melbourne a week later to an audience of 665,000 taking the total viewers for episode 1 to 2,185,000
^{3} Episode 2 was played at 9:30 in Melbourne as part 2 of a 2-hour season premiere.
