= Packed to the Rafters season 3 =

Season of television series

Packed to the Rafters
- Season 3
- Season 3 DVD
- No. of episodes: 22

Release
- Original network: Seven Network
- Original release: 29 June – 16 November 2010

Season chronology
- ← Previous; Season 2 Next → Season 4

The third season of Packed to the Rafters, an Australian drama television series, began airing on 29 June 2010 on the Seven Network. The season concluded on 16 November 2010 after 22 episodes. The third season aired Tuesdays at 8:30 pm in Australia and averaged 1,894,000 viewers. The season was released on DVD as a six disc set under the title of Packed to the Rafters: The Complete Season 3 on 20 April 2011.

The third season follows the Rafters as they adjust to life with a new baby and face their toughest test yet, the sudden and tragic loss of a loved one. For Julie and Dave, there's the financial stress of being a one-income family, the sense of being pulled in a hundred directions by the needs of their adult children, and the strain placed on their marriage as the stress and exhaustion of caring for a baby takes hold. Rachel, the eldest Rafter child, struggles to find balance between her high-flying new job and her relationship with Jake; Ben, recently married to Melissa, is trying for kids until an accident shatters his world; and Nathan is estranged and ultimately divorced from his wife Sammy. Add to the mix, new family members Coby and Dave's father, Tom, and life for the Rafters has never been more packed.

== Cast ==
=== Regular ===
- Rebecca Gibney as Julie Rafter
- Erik Thomson as Dave Rafter
- Jessica Marais as Rachel Rafter
- Angus McLaren as Nathan Rafter
- Hugh Sheridan as Ben Rafter
- George Houvardas as Carbo Karandonis
- Michael Caton as Ted Taylor
- Jessica McNamee as Sammy Rafter (episodes 1–8)
- Zoe Ventoura as Melissa Bannon (episodes 1–21)
- James Stewart as Jake Barton (episodes 11–22) (Note: James Stewart had been listed as recurring previous to being upgraded to main character status)

=== Featuring ===
- John Howard as Tom Jennings

=== Recurring and guest ===
- Gillian Jones as Rachel "Chel" Warne
- Hannah and Sebella Storey as Ruby Rafter
- Mercia Deane-Johns as Grace Barton
- Kristian Schmid as Alex Barton
- Sarah Chadwick as Trish Westaway
- Amy Mathews as Erin
- Hannah Marshall as Loretta 'Retta' Schembri
- Ryan Corr as Coby Jennings
- Grant Dodwell as Doug

==== Jessica McNamee's departure ====
Jessica McNamee confirmed on 30 July 2010 that she would be departing from the series, with plans to return to university to finish a deferred arts degree. McNamee's last episode aired in August 2010.

==== Zoe Ventoura's departure ====
It was revealed that the series was set to kill off one of its main characters and that it would not be revealed until the episode had aired. Towards the end of the episode, it was revealed that Melissa Bannon Rafter was involved in a car crash that took her life. The cause of the fatal crash was due to Mel using her mobile phone and driving at the same time. She went through a stop sign and was hit by another car. Ventoura stated that her characters departure was her decision because she wanted to pursue an acting career in the US. Her last episode aired in November 2010

On 20 February 2011, Ventoura put her plans to head to the states on hold, to star in another Seven Network series, Wild Boys.

== Episodes ==
No. overall	No. in season	Title	Narrator	Directed by	Written by	Original release date	Australian viewers (millions)
45	1	"The Blank Page"	Julie Rafter	Pino Amenta	Jeff Truman	29 June 2010	1.917
After Ruby's birth, Julie rests in hospital, Dave creates a user account on the social networking site Facebook, Carbo discovers fame when he posts a YouTube video doing his "walla-walla-wincha!" thumbs-up. Jake once again has a seizure, however epilepsy cannot be confirmed as the cause until he has another fit. Nathan reveals his intention to move next door so that the baby can have a nursery.
46	2	"Saturday Night, Sunday Morning"	Julie Rafter	Pino Amenta	Marieke Hardy	29 June 2010	1.917
Julie loses confidence as a mother after Ruby refuses to breastfeed. Tired by little sleep, Julie gives up. Now single, Nathan along with Carbo visit a nightclub, and Ben feels left out. Jake also feels conflicted when his mum begins dating, and Mel's loyalty is tested to the limits when she encounters Sammy, who pleads with her not to inform Nathan that she's still in Sydney.
47	3	"To Tell or Not to Tell"	Dave Rafter	Chris Martin-Jones	Abe Pogos	6 July 2010	1.802
Dave attempts to tell Rachel about how his father Tom Jennings is still alive, and concerned with Nathan's constantly partying, Dave decides to force him to tag along a road-trip to Coolong where Tom was last known living. Meanwhile, Melissa struggles to keep Sammy's secret from being discovered by Ben.
48	4	"A Good Husband"	Ben Rafter	Chris Martin-Jones	Margaret Wilson	13 July 2010	1.899
Ben is enjoying his married life up until his wife Melissa is too tired to have intercourse with him. Melissa is worried about Sammy sinking deeper into the world of depression. Meanwhile, Jake is in thought for becoming a better son to his parents.
49	5	"The Invisible Man"	Ted Taylor	Ian Watson	Tony Morphett	20 July 2010	1.914
Ted comes to terms with the death of a neighbour and deals with an injured Chel. Meanwhile, Melissa is annoyed because of the lack of privacy from others in the household, and Carbo receives sexy gifts from an online love interest.
50	6	"Home Coming"	Rachel Rafter	Ian Watson	Christine McCourt	27 July 2010	1.910
Rachel's dream of moving in with Jake is thrown into jeopardy by the unexpected return of Alex. Meanwhile, Nathan has been roped into helping Chel with her taxes. Although her records are in a complete mess, they do have a good time, and in a discussion about attitudes to life he admits that he does not like himself very much and blames himself for the breakup with Sammy. Carbo finally meets his internet admirer, an underage girl.
51	7	"Simple Needs"	Julie Rafter	Lynn Hegarty	Rick Held	3 August 2010	2.017
The Rafters must deal with crushing news when Julie is forced to shift her focus from baby Ruby to include the more complex needs of the other members of her family. Meanwhile, Rachel struggles with deep-buried jealousy towards baby Ruby. Carbo attempts to discourage his teenage stalker, and Nathan is forced to deal with the news that Sammy never went to London and is ready and strong enough now to reconnect with the Rafters and meet baby Ruby.
52	8	"Rites of Passage"	Nathan Rafter	Lynn Hegarty	Jenny Lewis	10 August 2010	2.001
Nathan is forced to question his motives for wanting to donate a kidney, triggering a crisis of confidence. Will he be able to put his demons to rest and in doing so, save Chel's life? Nathan and Sammy say goodbye for the final time, as Sammy takes up that job in London.
53	9	"The Price of Parenthood"	Dave Rafter	Cherie Nowlan	Trent Roberts	17 August 2010	1.904
After disturbing an intruder, a trap is set to catch the culprit. Meanwhile, Rachel is shocked by Jake and Alex's domestic standards.
54	10	"Out of the Comfort Zone"	Ben Rafter	Cherie Nowlan	Marieke Hardy	24 August 2010	1.917
Ben is forced to step outside his comfort zone when a moral stand clashes with workplace politics. Meanwhile, Julie steps out of her comfort zone, too, by joining a local mother's group.
55	11	"Lessons in Happiness"	Rachel Rafter	Chris Martin-Jones	Boaz Stark	31 August 2010	1.847
Rachel rides the ups and downs of happiness, struggling to find it in the frenetic pace of life. But will her choices have future repercussions for her relationship with her family and Jake?
56	12	"Moment of Truth"	Nathan Rafter	Chris Martin-Jones	Jeff Truman	7 September 2010	1.739
Nathan faces a life-changing moment of truth – the operation to donate a kidney to beloved grandmother Chel. Meanwhile Carbo's "twitching" date with Solar Panel agent Amy proves to be a disaster. Undaunted, he vows to continue the hunt for a wife.
57	13	"Live and Let Live"	Julie Rafter	Pino Amenta	Margaret Wilson	14 September 2010	1.867
Julie explores the principle of "live and let live" as she and others struggle to implement the philosophy in various areas of their lives. A possum has taken up residence in the Rafter roof, keeping the family up at night with its nocturnal activities. Meanwhile, Nathan and Chel are both enjoying a new lease of life despite still being in hospital, Rachel is enjoying the last few days of freedom before starting her new job, and Carbo, still searching for "The One", is excited about his date with Erin. But there's some serious crossed wires in play...
58	14	"Know Yourself"	Dave Rafter	Pino Amenta	Tony Morphett	21 September 2010	1.873
Dave Rafter prides himself on being easy going and uncomplicated. He knows himself and life is going well – or so he thought. In rapid succession, life teaches him that no human ever has total control of things – and Dave's easy going ability to roll with the punches starts to fail him. Meanwhile, Rachel is trying to settle into her new job at EMB agency but her first day proves disconcertingly frustrating, and Carbo's wife-hunting on internet dating sites brings immediate success.
59	15	"Don't Go There!"	Ben Rafter	Catherine Millar	Nick Stevens	28 September 2010	1.685
When Melissa feels queasy during dinner, Ben immediately assumes she is pregnant and is beside himself with excitement. Next door, there's little rest and relaxation for Dave, who is working extra-long hours, saving up for a holiday to Fiji. But his plans cop a setback when an unexpected tax bill lobs on the doorstep.
60	16	"When Worlds Collide"	Rachel Rafter	Catherine Millar	Chris Hawkshaw	5 October 2010	1.671
Rachel's relationship with Jake is pushed to breaking point when her work and personal lives collide. Dave's money and work woes are stressing him out, so Julie offers to help the business by doing accounts, freeing Nathan up to do some light labouring. Carbo has failed to talk his mother out of selling the house. As the real estate agent and potential buyers come around, Carbo puts on a desperate show, hoping to scare everyone away. When bathroom fittings go missing from their work-site, Coby pleads with Nathan to believe he is innocent.
61	17	"Spark of Life"	Ted Taylor	Lynn Hegarty	Chris McCourt	12 October 2010	1.765
Ted returns with renewed spark from a rejuvenating break, only to find all is not well with his family. Due to work and money pressures, Julie and Dave are snapping at each other and Julie seeks respite in light conversation with Hamish, one of her friends from mothers' group. Meanwhile, to the consternation of his flatmates, Carbo is totally besotted by the irrepressible Retta and is valiantly trying to go along with her no-sex rule.
62	18	"Between the Covers"	Nathan Rafter	Lynn Hegarty	Martin McKenna	19 October 2010	1.795
A wild night in Kings Cross teaches Nathan not to judge a book by its cover. Meanwhile, Carbo is making big plans for his proposal to Retta, but Ben is determined to intervene. And Rachel's deal with Liam to stop playing games and join forces seems to be working, even if their pitch ideas for a sports drink are not.
63	19	"Breathe"	Rachel Rafter	Chris Martin-Jones	Rick Held	26 October 2010	1.686
Rachel takes a crash course in remembering to breathe as she juggles a toxic workplace and an estranged boyfriend. Desperate to see each other, Jake arrives in the middle of the night with a gift for Rachel. But once again their issues flare and they fight bitterly. Finally opening the present Jake bought her, Rachel realises that Jake truly respects her ambitions, and that she's misjudged him. Dave too is taking a crash course in remembering to stop and breathe. A welcome distraction arrives when Julie wins a phone-in radio competition. Meanwhile, Melissa and Ben are still trying, unsuccessfully, to conceive, and Nathan finds a way to help Coby face the challenge of learning to read and write.
64	20	"Perfect Bubble"	Ben Rafter	Chris Martin-Jones	Boaz Stark	2 November 2010	2.335
Newly unemployed Rachel is seeing the world in a new light, as her oyster. But first what she'd love more than anything is a holiday with Jake. Unbeknownst to her, Jake takes the hint and organises time off – but before he can spring the surprise, Rachel gets a phone call from former boss Paul Morgan offering her job back with better perks and more money. Meanwhile, Ben is waiting for Mel to attend their romantic evening, that ends up never coming about, as Mel is involved in a car accident. The episode ends with a horrified Ben identifying Mel's body in the morgue.
65	21	"Rest in Peace"	Julie Rafter	Pino Amenta	Margaret Wilson	9 November 2010	2.093
Julie and Dave struggle to help their family rebuild their lives in the aftermath of the devastating tragedy as additional support comes from unlikely quarters. Meanwhile, Coby is again confronted by his past and Chel returns to be on hand in her beloved new family’s hour of need. Dave is determined to shelve his battle with depression, but as tensions build, his temper becomes explosive. Note: This is the final appearance of Gillian Jones as Rachel 'Chel' Warne. For the remainder of the series, the character is never mentioned and no explanation is given regarding her whereabouts. This is also the final regular appearance of Zoe Ventoura as Melissa Bannon, though the character would return in flashbacks in Season 5.
66	22	"One Day at a Time"	Dave Rafter	Pino Amenta	Jeff Truman	16 November 2010	2.080
With Christmas and Ruby's first birthday fast approaching, Dave searches for the words to put himself and his family back on track. Dave is struggling with his own demons. Julie gently convinces him to give therapy another try. Finally able to find the words his therapist's been pushing for, it seems that Dave might finally be starting to address some of his issues. And then when the whole family gathers for Ruby's first birthday and she takes a first tentative step, it seems all could be coming right in the Rafter world. Julie discovers that Coby's apprenticeship papers have arrived. In the spirit of moving on, the Rafters feel that life is too short to hold grudges. Dave speaks to Coby, who promises never to let them down again and Dave renews his offer of an apprenticeship to a grateful nephew. Ben discovers the truth about Mel's death.
