= Packed to the Rafters season 4 =

Packed to the Rafters
- Season 4
- Season 4 DVD
- No. of episodes: 22

Release
- Original network: Seven Network
- Original release: 8 February 2011 – 20 March 2012

Season chronology
- ← Previous; Season 3 Next → Season 5

The fourth season of Packed to the Rafters, an Australian drama television series, began on 8 February 2011 on the Seven Network. The season concluded on 20 March 2012 after 22 episodes.

Season four traces the family's fortunes as they attempt to rebuild their lives in the aftermath of Melissa's death. Strong family bonds ensure that traumatised Ben receives warm support as he takes his first steps back into the work-force. Slowly he learns to smile again, embracing a newfound interest in gardening and a growing friendship with his boss's daughter Emma, which might hold the promise of something more. There are further love issues in the Karandonis household, with Carbo and Retta choosing to elope rather than face the comic extravagance of a Karandonis wedding. Julie and Dave, meanwhile, are forced to deal with the consequences for Rachel and Jake of a dangerous accusation flung at him by a drunken woman on a rugby weekend away. Rachel's feelings for Jake are tested to the limit, especially when her boss throws into the confusing mix the chance of a lifetime to work in New York. The Rafters also wrestle with the unexpected arrival of new family members, not the least being the release from prison of Dave's father, Tom. Tom's never quite predictable manipulations ultimately force Dave to take a heart-breaking stand, and cause him to initially misjudge the intentions of his half-brother, Matt. Julie meanwhile finds a new best friend in Donna, though their initial exchanges are hilariously unpromising. Meanwhile, Nathan is searching for new direction in his life and his desire to travel forces Julie and Dave to undertake some soul-searching of their own. Ted is also keen to find a greater purpose, mentoring a troubled twelve-year-old boy.

== Cast ==
=== Regular ===
- Rebecca Gibney as Julie Rafter
- Erik Thomson as Dave Rafter
- Angus McLaren as Nathan Rafter
- Hugh Sheridan as Ben Rafter
- George Houvardas as Carbo Karandonis
- James Stewart as Jake Barton
- Michael Caton as Ted Taylor
- Jessica Marais as Rachel Rafter (episodes 1–7) (Note: In episode 22, Jessica Marais appeared via a Skype call)
- Ryan Corr as Coby Jennings (episodes 5–22) (Note: Ryan Corr had been listed as recurring previous to being upgraded to main character status)

=== Featuring ===
- John Howard as Tom Jennings

=== Recurring and guest ===
- Hannah Marshall as Retta Schembri
- Dina Panozzo as Rita Karandonis
- Hannah and Sabella Storey as Ruby Rafter
- Martin Lynes as Paul Morgan
- Diarmid Heidenreich as Camel
- Torquil Neilson as Hamish
- Sarah Snook as Jodi Webb
- Annette Shun Wah as Mai
- Merridy Eastman as Donna Mackey
- Kristian Schmid as Alex Barton
- Camille Keenan as Bree Jennings
- Zoe Cramond as Emma Mackey
- Alexandra Park as Courtney

==== Jessica Marais' departure ====
Jessica Marais, who plays Rachel Rafter, announced on 15 February 2011 that the fourth season will be her last season of Packed to the Rafters. Her final episode was announced to air sometime in June or July 2011, but new episodes had yet to air. The series returned 23 August 2011 with Marais' final episode. Marais' departure was due to her desire to head to the US in hopes of securing work during pilot season. Marais has filmed a few scenes via Skype for the last episode of Season 4.

== Season Hiatuses ==
The Seven Network put Packed to the Rafters on hiatus from 15 March 2011 and was replaced by one of the networks new drama series, Winners & Losers. The series was expected to return in either June or July 2011, but new episodes had yet to air. The series returned 23 August 2011.

Packed to the Rafters again went on hiatus from 25 October 2011 and returned 14 February 2012 with a double episode.

== Episodes ==
No. overall	No. in season	Title	Narrator	Directed by	Written by	Original release date	Australian viewers (millions)
67	1	"What Lies Beneath"	Ben Rafter	Pino Amenta	Jeff Truman	8 February 2011	1.943
Three months have passed since Melissa's funeral and Ben is still on his road trip around Australia, but is thinking of returning home. He returns with many unexplained secrets (that he briefly mentions in his commentary). Rita arrives at the family house to attend Carbo and Retta’s engagement party, and nerves are at an all time high, and Rita has a secret of her own. Coby confides in Jake that he is struggling with Rachel moving in fulltime, and Ben’s positive façade is questioned when his emotions bubble to the surface.
68	2	"In with the New"	Dave Rafter	Pino Amenta	Boaz Stark	15 February 2011	1.815
As Council Clean-Up Days looms Dave gets the clean-out bug, chucking stuff out from the big and small sheds. He's distracted, however, by Nathan's return from the big road trip. Dave soon picks up on an underlying tension between Nathan and Ben, although neither brother is willing to admit to it. Jake and Coby head off for a rugby weekend and Rachel is left to enjoy the house alone. Carbo meanwhile, is playing the supportive son as Rita, still shaken by her marriage breakup, puts Carbo and Retta to work.
69	3	"Careful What You Wish For"	Rachel Rafter	Shirley Barrett	Marieke Hardy	22 February 2011	1.796
Rachel wrestles with the potentially relationship-wrecking pitfalls of getting everything you want, particularly when truth is number one on the wish-list. Guilt-ridden about invading Coby's private garage space, Rachel compounds her sin by inadvertently offering his artwork as part of an advertising campaign. Rachel is also having honesty issues with Jake, who's being vague about his reasons for quitting rugby. Things come to a head at Coby's party, when the police come to take Jake away for questioning. Meanwhile, Carbo and Retta continue to suffer as Rita descends further into loneliness, driving her neighbours mad with dirge-like Greek folk music. A vacancy at the local child care centre sends Ruby's baby-sitters Ben and Ted into a spin, and they become locked in a comic competition to prove their baby-sitting worth.
70	4	"Other People's Eyes"	Julie Rafter	Shirley Barrett	Anthony Ellis	1 March 2011	1.748
The aftermath of Jake's ill-fated rugby weekend is fully felt as Julie realises how much perception and misperception can affect the lives of her family and friends. Rachel is determined to support Jake in light of his charges of attempted sexual assault, but would not let her. Rachel's woes are mixed when her boss, Paul Morgan tells her he expects her to deliver a contract signed by Coby as the main artist for their new alcopop campaign. Ted meanwhile reveals to Julie that he's developed a crush on a beautiful Chinese woman, Mai who has been teaching Tai Chi in the park every morning.
71	5	"The Taste of Freedom"	Nathan Rafter	Lynn-Maree Danzey	Martin McKenna	8 March 2011	1.806
Nathan receives some potentially upsetting news – his divorce from Sammy is final. Coby is also grappling with the issue of freedom as the day of his sentencing hearing arrives. Having promised to vouch for Coby in court, Dave is confident that he will get a slap on the wrists and that will be the end of it.
72	6	"The Dollshouse"	Julie Rafter	Lynn-Maree Danzey	Jenny Lewis	15 March 2011	1.709
Jake returns to the scene of the alleged attempted rape to confront Jodi. Nathan is having trouble getting attention for his Parts Exchange website, so he enlist Ben's help. But Ben shortly realises that Nathan's business name "Parts Exchange" reads as "Part Sex Change" when run together in a domain name. When Nathan starts to receive dodgy emails and phone calls, he finally realises his mistake and gets angry with Ben for letting him make a fool of himself.
73	7	"Sweet Sorrow"	Rachel Rafter	Lynn Hegarty	Margaret Wilson	23 August 2011	2.011
Rachel gets ready to leave for New York. Tom, Dave’s father, announces his parole has come through and he’s looking forward to spending time with the family. Note: This is the last episode to feature Jessica Marais as Rachel Rafter
74	8	"The Male Communication Handbook"	Dave Rafter	Ian Gilmour	Jeff Truman	30 August 2011	1.798
Dave relishes finally having a relationship with his dad, Tom, but Julie is concerned that Tom may not have reformed his crooked ways. Tensions rise next door when Carbo's feelings are hurt at having not been asked to be a part of Nathan's car spares business. Meanwhile, Jake and Coby are surprised by the sudden reappearance of Alex.
75	9	"From Little Things"	Ben Rafter	Ian Gilmour	Chris McCourt	6 September 2011	1.812
Ted's convinced Tom is not looking for work at all and instead is sneaking off to spend time with an unknown lady friend. A distraught Hamish arrives on Julie's doorstep, snapping under the pressure of his custody battle. Julie finally comes clean to Dave about the extent of her previous friendship with Hamish, to which he cannot help but feel a little bit jealous. Meanwhile, Ben continues to take little steps towards rebuilding his life while struggling to cope with his new boss Donna, and finds an unexpected friend in his boss's daughter, Emma.
76	10	"Big Kids"	Nathan Rafter	Lynn Hegarty	Boaz Stark	13 September 2011	1.730
Out of her comfort zone, Julie attends a burlesque dance class with her new friend Donna. Dave is left feeling jealous and insecure about Julie's relationship with Hamish when he comes across some lingerie that Julie has bought for her performance and she doesn't wear it. Meanwhile, Ted makes it clear to Nathan he doesn't trust Tom at all and is avoiding houseguest Tom at every opportunity.
77	11	"Swimming in the Gene Pool"	Jake Barton	Nicholas Bufalo	Trent Roberts	20 September 2011	1.830
Grace, Jake and Alex's mother, announces she's engaged. The boys are both happy for her until they discover she never actually legally divorced their father. Grace goes to meet with her ex-husband, but things get complicated. Alex doesn't ever want to see his father, but Jake's curiosity gets the better of him. Bree, Tom's granddaughter, visits him in hospital, but Coby is less than thrilled to see his feisty sister again.
Part 2
78	12	"You've Got to Have Friends"	Julie Rafter	Nicholas Bufalo	David Lawrence	4 October 2011	1.750
Julie and Donna's new found friendship is tested when Julie discovers that Donna suffers from OCD. Meanwhile, Ben and Emma's friendship grows stronger and Ben also forges a new connection with his grandfather Tom. Jake is determined to help clear the air between Coby and Bree and invites her to dinner at their house. Bree reveals she is homeless and Alex invites her to crash at their place, but he doesn't exactly check with Coby. During a late night encounter, Jake and Bree share some unsettling sexual tension in the kitchen.
79	13	"Tipping Point"	Dave Rafter	Steve Jodrell	Marieke Hardy	11 October 2011	1.733
Dave leaps at the chance when his successful friend Warney, offers him a shot at the contract for a big office rewiring job. Ben is encouraged by Tom to consider opening up his own bar and Tom offers to help him organise the finances, but Coby immediately becomes suspicious of Tom's motives. Retta begins to feel the pressure of wedding preparations, but things get worse when Carbo brings his livewire cousin Voula, in to help. Meanwhile, Jake tries to hide his attraction to Bree in front of Alex.
80	14	"Trust Issues"	Ben Rafter	Steve Jodrell	Margaret Wilson	18 October 2011	1.785
Ben opens up to Emma about Melissa's death, which in turn enables him to finally get some closure. Dave approaches Nathan about maybe wanting to re-join the family business. Meanwhile, Bree is forced to let Alex down gently, when his attentions become too much. Alex is embarrassed and denies it, but shares his true feelings with Jake. Jake warns Bree that what happened between them can never happen again.
81	15	"Risky Business"	Nathan Rafter	Roger Hodgman	Jenny Lewis	25 October 2011	1.753
Ben takes the boys out for a night on the town and everyone is impressed by the nightclub he takes them to. Alarm bells immediately sound for Nathan when Ben reveals that Tom put him in touch with a nightclub owner, who is courting Ben as a potential investor for his next business venture. While Nathan is at the club, he realises how rusty he is when it comes to talking to women, but forces himself to take a chance. Meanwhile, Carbo and Retta try to reassess their sex life and promise each other to always surprise one another.
82	16	"Second Chance"	Jake Barton	Roger Hodgman	Chris Hawkshaw	14 February 2012	1.693
Tom's disappearance with the insurance money has got everybody up in arms. Meanwhile, Coby secretly blames himself for not being honest with the Rafters about Tom's part in the worksite robberies.
83	17	"Small World"	Julie Rafter	Kevin Carlin	Martin McKenna	14 February 2012	1.520
Julie comes into contact with Matt Jennings, a taxi driver, who actually happens to be Tom's other son and Dave's half-brother.
84	18	"Sign of the Times"	Dave Rafter	Kevin Carlin	Abe Pogos	21 February 2012	1.664
Dave's increasingly demanding new job leaves him exhausted and for the first time, he forgets his anniversary. Julie eventually convinces Dave to take a much-needed break, but he is unaware that Matt has been hired as a replacement worker. Meanwhile, Nathan heads over to Jake and Coby's place for a drink when Matt and Bree turn up, where Nathan is charmed by his new uncle. Carbo finally tells Ben he's already married, but is unsure on how to break the news to his mother. Ben finally admits to Nathan that he's falling for Emma, but fears it may be too soon for his liking.
85	19	"Leap of Faith"	Ted Taylor	Chris Martin-Jones	Jeff Truman	28 February 2012	1.701
Ted is trying to find the new purpose in his life. He decides to do all the things he's always wanted to do, but has never had the time: home-brewing, volunteer work, finding a job – even skydiving. But when Donna declines his request for a job at the Boat Club, Ted is dealt the first of many blows to his confidence. Meanwhile, Ben agrees to go to the movies with Emma, knowing that so long as other friends go with them, there's no pressure of the evening feeling like a date. But when Retta gets food poisoning and cannot go, and Carbo refuses to leave his wife's side, it means that for Ben, the pressure is back on: it's now a date. Dave is struggling to take his own leap of faith and accept his brother Matt.
86	20	"Butterfly's Wings"	Julie Rafter	Chris Martin-Jones	Chris McCourt	6 March 2012	1.723
Dave and Julie discover how one inexplicable chain of events can almost end in disaster. Dave is alone with Ruby when he gets a call requiring his presence back on site. With no babysitter, Dave takes Ruby with him and enlists Coby to look after her. For a brief moment Coby takes his eyes off Ruby and she wanders into the building site. Panic sets in when Dave discovers shes locked herself in a room with a dangerous drop. Will they get to her before its too late? Meanwhile, Ben is doing his best to take things slowly with Emma, but Carbo makes his disapproval known after having witnessed Ben and Emma's kiss.
87	21	"Sleepwalking"	Ben Rafter	Pino Amenta	Boaz Stark	13 March 2012	1.906
When Ben and Retta discover Carbo sleepwalking due to wedding stress, they decide he must tell his parents he's already married before he hurts himself. But Carbo receives an unwelcome surprise when Rita and Theo arrive early. Suddenly admitting the truth is not so easy and Ben is left to prepare a fake bucks party. Will they be able to deceive Rita and Theo, or will the lie unravel? In the midst of all this, Ben finds his affections for Emma growing despite his hesitations. And when they have their first argument, Ben is forced to confront his feelings. But will he finally be able to tell Emma how he really feels about her, or will he continue to sleepwalk through life?
88	22	"Endings and Beginnings"	Julie Rafter	Pino Amenta	Margaret Wilson	20 March 2012	1.700
Ben and Emma are both nervously looking forward to their first date. When Carbo and Retta return from the honeymoon from hell, Ben and Emma head out to a restaurant and enjoy a perfect evening. But the shine of the night fades when Emma sees that Ben is still carrying a photo of Mel in his wallet. Julie ponders the natural cycle of endings and beginnings when she receives a response from the publishing house. Meanwhile, the launch party of Rafter Electrical marks the beginning of a new era in Dave's career. Steve Wilson's arrival sends Matt into a star struck spin, but it's Nathan who gets the biggest surprise with some disturbing news from his ex-boss. Note: This is the last appearance of Camille Keenan as Bree Jennings. For the remainder of the series, her whereabouts remain unknown.

== Reception ==
=== Ratings ===
Episode	Title	Original airdate	Viewers^{1}	Nightly Rank	Weekly Rank
1; 4-01	"What Lies Beneath"	8 February 2011	1.943	1	1
2; 4-02	"In with the New"	15 February 2011	1.815	1	1
3; 4-03	"Careful What You Wish For"	22 February 2011	1.796	1	1
4; 4-04	"Other People's Eyes"	1 March 2011	1.748	1	1
5; 4-05	"The Taste of Freedom"	8 March 2011	1.806	1	1
6; 4-06	"The Dollhouse"	15 March 2011	1.709	1	1
7; 4-07	"Sweet Sorrow"	23 August 2011	2.011	1	6
8; 4-08	"The Male Communication Handbook"	30 August 2011	1.798	2	3
9; 4-09	"From Little Things"	6 September 2011	1.812	2	3
10; 4–10	"Big Kids"	13 September 2011	1.730	1	1
11; 4–11	"Swimming in the Gene Pool"	20 September 2011	1.830	3	3
12; 4–12	"You've Got to Have Friends"	4 October 2011	1.750	1	2
13; 4–13	"Tipping Point"	11 October 2011	1.733	1	1
14; 4–14	"Trust Issues"	18 October 2011	1.785	1	2
15; 4–15	"Risky Business"	25 October 2011	1.753	1	1
16; 4–16	"Second Chance"	14 February 2012	1.693	2	8
17; 4–17	"Small World"	14 February 2012	1.520	3	10
18; 4–18	"Sign of the Times"	21 February 2012	1.664	2	6
19; 4–19	"Leap of Faith"	28 February 2012	1.701	2	6
20; 4–20	"Butterfly's Wings"	6 March 2012	1.723	2	6
21; 4–21	"Sleepwalking"	13 March 2012	1.906	2	4
22; 4–22	"Endings and Beginnings"	20 March 2012	1.700	2	7

^{1} Viewer numbers are based on preliminary OzTAM data for Sydney, Melbourne, Brisbane, Adelaide and Perth combined.
