= Packed to the Rafters season 5 =

Packed to the Rafters
- Season 5
- Season 5 DVD
- No. of episodes: 22

Release
- Original network: Seven Network
- Original release: April 17, 2012 – April 16, 2013

Season chronology
- ← Previous; Season 4 Next → Season 6

The fifth season of Packed to the Rafters, an Australian drama television series premiered on 17 April 2012 on the Seven Network. There were 22 episodes. The Seven network put the series on hiatus again on June 19, 2012, after 10 episodes, despite previously promising that viewers would see a full season run. The show returned on 29 January 2013 with episode 11, accompanied by an increase in viewers compared to previous episodes of the season.

== Production ==
Packed to the Rafters was renewed for a fifth season with production on the episodes beginning from October 2011. Hugh Sheridan, who played Ben Rafter, filmed his final scenes for the fifth season in February 2012, before leaving the show. Angus McLaren, who played Nathan Rafter, took some time off during the fifth season and returned mid season in the 100th episode.

== Cast ==
=== Main cast ===
- Rebecca Gibney as Julie Rafter
- Erik Thomson as Dave Rafter
- Hugh Sheridan as Ben Rafter (13 episodes)
- Angus McLaren as Nathan Rafter (3 episodes)
- George Houvardas as Carbo Karandonis
- James Stewart as Jake Barton
- Ryan Corr as Coby Jennings
- Hannah Marshall as Retta Schembri-Karandonis
- Michael Caton as Ted Taylor

=== Recurring ===
- Hannah and Sabella Storey as Ruby Rafter
- Jacob Allen as Matt Jennings
- Merridy Eastman as Donna Mackey (21 episodes)
- Zoe Cramond as Emma Mackey (21 episodes)
- Brooke Satchwell as Frankie Calasso (21 episodes)

=== Guest ===
- Samantha Tolj as Sian Perry (12 episodes)
- Cameron Daddo as Adam Goodman (8 episodes)
- Andy Anderson as Jim Barton (5 episodes)
- Kristian Schmid as Alex Barton (4 episodes)
- Olivia Stambouliah as Voula Karandonis (4 episodes)
- Mark Lee as Duncan Galloway (4 episodes)
- Henry Nixon as Bryn Perry (3 episodes)
- Holly Fraser as Elisha (2 episodes)
- Lauren Clair as Saskia Clark Rafter (2 episodes)
- Steve Vidler as Mark Mackey (2 episodes)
- Zoe Ventoura as Mel Bannon (1 episode)

==== Hugh Sheridan's departure ====
Hugh Sheridan, who plays Ben Rafter, announced on 15 May 2012 that the fifth season would be their last season of Packed to the Rafters as a main cast member. Their final episode aired 5 February 2013, the series 100th episode. Sheridan returned for two episodes in season six.

== Episodes ==
No. overall	No. in season	Title	Narrator	Directed by	Written by	Original release date	Australian viewers (millions)
89	1	"Answering the Call"	Julie Rafter	Kevin Carlin	Jeff Truman	17 April 2012	1.384
Julie receives a surprise invitation to become a writer for the local paper. Dave, after interviewing people for the sparky job, is shocked when an attractive woman, Frankie turns up and she gets the job. Coby returns home from overseas, and is shocked to discover Matt has moved in with Jake. Ted continues to bond with Cooper, however Cooper's sister, Elisha, tries to jeopardise the friendship and ultimately Ted's reputation. Emma moves to claim a bigger place in Ben's life and she's relieved when he takes off his wedding ring.
90	2	"Great Expectations"	Dave Rafter	Kevin Carlin	Boaz Stark	24 April 2012	1.418
With Dave expanding his business and gaining a new premises and a new employee, he has high hopes, however what Dave considers chivalry is what Frankie considers sexism. Coby has a tough time adjusting to his new workmate, but his disapproval is actually masking his crush. The deadline for Julie's article is getting closer and she decides to procrastinate when she can't think of anything to write about. Ben has trouble asking Emma to stay the night, which is another bridge to cross in his grieving process. Retta implements a savings plan so she and Carbo can put a deposit down on a house. When Elisha begins blackmailing Ted, he turns to Donna for advice.
91	3	"The Power of Words"	Ben Rafter	Lynn-Maree Danzey	Margaret Wilson	1 May 2012	1.355
Matters of the heart are front and centre on Valentine's Day. Ben and Emma dodge the pressure by both doing a shift at the boat club. Donna has a crush on Ted and Julie is not impressed when Ben encourages Donna to ask Ted on a date. The date gets off to a rocky start when Ted arrives at the wrong venue, however Ben is to the rescue, which leaves Emma smitten. The pressure between Emma and Ben gets even worse when those three little words are muttered - and someone misses the moment to reciprocate. Matt decides to play a cruel joke on Coby and Jake by giving them both an anonymous Valentine's Day card.
92	4	"The Things We Do for Love"	Coby Jennings	Lynn-Maree Danzey	Marieke Hardy	8 May 2012	1.405
It becomes quite obvious that Coby had a crush on Frankie despite his best efforts to hide his true feelings. Dave and Julie's marriage is at a tense time when Dave begins spending extra hours at work for a suspicious reason. Julie meets up with Adam after he says they need to discuss work, however she finds herself confiding in him about her personal problems and their relationships begins to move in a romantic direction. After a fight with Dave, Julie meets up with Adam to vent out her frustration and she quickly realises she may have feelings for Adam. Adam asks Julie if she'd like to cool off at his place and after accepting, Julie ends up staying the night...and someone is watching. Julie also makes amends with Donna, after her radio interview, and informs her of how the demise of her friendship with Chrissy played a role in her scepticism of Donna and Ted's relationship. Jake begins dating Sian and Ben and Emma decide to go on a romantic date.
93	5	"Judgment Day"	Jake Barton	Lynn Hegarty	Trent Roberts	15 May 2012	1.422
Jake's father, Jim, returns and throws Jake's world into a tailspin. Off this, Jake makes several poor judgements that threaten not only his job, but his relationship with Dave. Meanwhile, Dave notices how much Adam enjoys Julie's company, but he has a hard time accepting it when he becomes jealous. Retta discovers she's pregnant but convinced that Carbo is a child on the inside, she holds off telling him.
94	6	"Secret Fears"	Dave Rafter	Lynn Hegarty	Chris McCourt	22 May 2012	1.459
Dave struggles with his secret fear that his relationship with Jake is permanently damaged and that Julie's relationship with Adam might turn out to be more than just professional. Will Dave be able to rein in his fears before they cause him and his family even more heartache? A love-struck Coby completes a painting for Frankie. At first she's thrilled — until she learns how he really feels. When talking to Sian, Frankie admits the truth about who she is really trying to suppress her feelings for. Who does Frankie fancy, and could it make things even more awkward at work? Meanwhile, Ben's having issues. Carbo and Retta are filled with constant expressions of affection, permanently reminding him of Emma's unreturned 'I love you'. Should Ben return the sentiment — even if he isn't a hundred percent clear on his own feelings?
95	7	"The Great Escape"	Ben Rafter	Pino Amenta	Martin McKenna	29 May 2012	1.534
Ben is being driven quietly crazy by the baby-obsessed Carbo and Retta. Feeling edged out of the world they are creating, Emma suggests that the two of them get out of town for a few days, a large step forward in their relationship for Ben. But once you've found escape, the trouble comes returning from it. After being romantically shunned by Frankie, Coby does his best to avoid her at work. However, when the awkwardness becomes too much to bear, Frankie makes a proposal. Meanwhile, Julie begins life as the new kid at the local newspaper and her new lease on life inspires Dave to move forward with his own business plans, leading to frustrations between the couple. Will venturing into a new future drive a wedge between Dave and Julie?
96	8	"Unwritten Rules"	Julie Rafter	Pino Amenta	Kim Wilson	5 June 2012	1.369
Julie admits to Donna having had a recent raunchy dream about Adam, but denies nothing is wrong in her marriage. Questioned by Ted, Dave also comes to the same conclusion. But alone that night, Julie and Dave argue yet again, this time about who will baby-sit Ruby, as Julie has a movie premiere with Adam and Dave is taking his employees away to a seminar. When Julie can't go to the premiere, Adam drops by later that night and Julie is primed for some easy company after the tension with Dave. They chat for hours, discussing life's journeys and confiding a few secrets. Julie maintains it is all very innocent, so why does she feel so guilty? Dave too, is up for a big night, drinking until the small hours with his team. And then one brief moment threatens to destroy everything.
97	9	"A Kiss Is Just a Kiss"	Dave Rafter	Kevin Carlin	Kim Wilson and Jenny Lewis	12 June 2012	1.590
Following an awkward moment, Frankie announces she's going to quit but Dave convinces her not to make an rash decisions. With a niggling feeling of guilt, Julie tells Dave about Adam's visit for a late-night drink, stopping short of sharing her growing attraction to her boss. Confiding her crush to Donna, Julie is given further pause for concern when Donna warns her she could be moving into dangerous emotional territory. However, when Julie receives some shocking news from Dave, will she be forgiving, or be driven into the arms of her boss?
98	10	"Letting Go"	Ted Taylor	Kevin Carlin	Hamilton Budd	19 June 2012	1.557
Tension remains high in the Rafter house as Julie and Dave struggle to forgive each other. Ted is caught in the middle and is feeling the strain. He's sick of having to hide the real reason behind their squabbles from Ben and implores them to move on before they have to explain everything to their son. But it is clear that letting go could be a long way off for our couple as they accept Bens invitation to a weekend in the country. Meanwhile, Carbo is also having trouble letting go of something - his beloved Charger. Having deemed it unsuitable for transporting babies. Retta decides they have to sell it. However, Carbo is outraged and is prepared to go to extreme lengths to protect his other baby.
99	11	"The Right Time"	Ben Rafter	Lynn-Maree Danzey	Rick Held	29 January 2013	1.613
Ben and Emma decide to get a loan from the bank to get their cottage, however when he goes to the hospital, he - and Emma - realise that he still isn't over Mel and they decide to break up. Julie and Dave struggle with his infidelity, however when they go out for dinner, they spent the rest of the night having sex. Donna, who is having trouble with Ben and Emma's news, urges Ted to have an Alzheimer's test, or at least tell Julie. Frankie and Coby bond over a football game and over a game of Jenga. Retta and Carbo, who attend a 12-week ultrasound, decide to tell their friends that they are pregnant, however Retta later suffers a miscarriage and breaks down in tears in Carbo's arms.
100	12	"Life's Surprises"	Julie Rafter	Lynn-Maree Danzey	Margaret Wilson	5 February 2013	1.762
Nathan returns home with two secrets from his holiday around the world. After being greeted by his family and going out to lunch, the family finds out that Nathan has married his cougar, Saskia, whom he has known for three months. When the family goes out for dinner, the second secret is revealed: Saskia is pregnant with Nathan's baby. Julie has a hard time accepting this news, however she finally accepts it, and Saskia. Carbo and Retta have appeared to have moved on from their loss, however Retta informs Carbo that she doesn't want to go rushing back into having kids. She then gets Carbo his Charger back. Ted goes in for an exam to find out whether he has Alzheimer's and the symptoms aren't looking good. Ben decides that he needs to move on with his life and decides to take a trip around the world, first to New York to see Rachel and then to London. Return episode of Angus McLaren as Nathan Rafter
101	13	"Filling the Void"	Julie Rafter	Ian Watson	Marieke Hardy	12 February 2013	1.533
Jake is settling into a comfortable, productive routine with Sian when a familiar whirlwind blusters back into his life... Alex. Turfed from his room in light of Alex's reappearance, Matt gratefully takes up Julie's offer of a spare bed. Dave is concerned Matt will become a freeloading mainstay at their house, but Julie, trying to fill the void left by her absent children, sells him on the idea. Meanwhile, Ben's absence is being acutely felt by Emma, but her sadness is momentarily eclipsed by her joy at the reappearance of her father, Mark, who is still smarting from a breakup of his own. Carbo too is missing Ben when cousin Voula turns up on their doorstep, having heard about the now-vacant room.
102	14	"Bad Habits"	Julie Rafter	Ian Watson	Alison Boleyn	12 February 2013	1.533
Dave bets julie that she can't refrain from giving advice. For "mother-to-all" Julie, that's of course impossible. Rita discovers that honesty is the best policy when dealing with new housemate Voula but it is a difficult concept for Carbo to learn. Coby is drowning in his new relationship with Heather and resorts to desperate measure to break up with her. Alex's drug habit and friendship with Sian's brother (Frankie's ex) is a cause for concern for all involved. Emma has high hopes for her parents getting back together.
103	15	"Moments of Clarity"	Ted Taylor	Roger Hodgman	David Lawrance	19 February 2013	1.559
In light of his ongoing tests, Ted isn't sure whether he should reveal his health concerns to his family. When he suffers a mild stroke and witnesses how badly the incident affects Julie and Dave, he resolves to keep the tests to himself. Emma's dad has moved into Donna's spare room as he searches for a house to buy. However, when old habits begin to rear their ugly head, Donna has a big decision to make. Meanwhile, Matt and Voula find their usual roles reversed — with Matt playing the lovesick pursuer and Voula the one fleeing the bedroom in the middle of the night.
104	16	"Displacement"	Dave Rafter	Roger Hodgman	Abe Pogos	26 February 2013	1.609
The cleanup after the fire begins and tension rises everywhere. Donna accidentally reveals Ted's secret tests to Julie and Dave when Ted decides he wants to go into residential aged care. Donna takes up pottery and begins flirting with Gary, a man from her OCD support group. Retta and Voula try to get Carbo to prove himself as a man when he refuses to have sex with Retta. volua decides to move out and the idea of having Emma move in is tossed up in the air. Dave is called to pick Alex up from a party when he gets stoned. Jake confronts Bryn about dealing to Alex and this causes Jake and Sian to have their first real fight, while sparks fly between Coby and Frankie.
105	17	"Keeping Step"	Julie Rafter	Jet Wilkinson	Martin McKenna	5 March 2013	1.582
Julie feels at odds with both Ted and Dave over the severity of Ted's condition — and falling back into step is going to be easier said than done. Meanwhile, despite having rejected Coby's initial interest in her, Frankie is finally letting her guard down. But can she open herself up enough to admit her true feelings for Coby, or are they destined to never quite fall into lock step?
106	18	"That Heady Rush"	Frankie Calasso	Jet Wilkinson	Greg Millin	12 March 2013	1.568
Frankie is caught up in that heady rush a new relationship brings. She seems to be coping pretty well, but is struggling working with Coby. Dave is riding a heady rush of his own when Duncan offers the Rafter Electrical team a big contract. But celebratory drinks take a sour turn, and Frankie's forced to rebuff a drunken pass. She assumes it's over and done with. Little does she know, the moment will come back to haunt her.
107	19	"Got What It Takes"	Dave Rafter	Lynn-Maree Danzey	Chris McCourt	19 March 2013	1.562
Dave is determined to take his business to the next level, beginning with his new contract with Duncan. But when Duncan's wandering eye puts him on a collision course with Coby, Dave has to stop the impact. Meanwhile, Frankie's not impressed with Coby's seeming lack of maturity, starting with his inability to let go of his rage over Duncan's pass at her.
108	20	"Weathering the Storm"	Jake Barton	Lynn-Maree Danzey	Drew Proffitt	26 March 2013	1.411
Given the circumstances with Coby, Dave and Julie try to end their business dealings with Duncan but he holds them to their contract. Coby's actions have also created a wedge between Donna and Julie, putting strain on their friendship. Unable to avoid Frankie, Coby steps up, taking full responsibility for everything. When Frankie expresses her regret over what happened, Coby reads it as regret over their break up. Carbo, Retta and Emma are also feeling the strain as they launch their new venture as an urban garden business. After the wet weather leads to a less than bustling first day of business, Retta struggles to maintain a positive face at the opening drinks.
109	21	"Free to Choose"	Dave Rafter	Pino Amenta	Boaz Stark	9 April 2013	1.372
Jake, Dave, Frankie and Matt worry about Coby and his disappearance. Jake promises his father Jim that he will be there when he dies. He turns up drunk and threatens Duncan, who calls the police. Jake catches Coby coming out of the house, but when Coby runs and Jake and Matt try to find him, Jim passes away. Coby decides to turn himself in after Jake tells him off and Frankie and him share a final goodbye. Ted takes Cooper and Julie to an aged care facility, where he plans to move into, but at the last minute he changes his mind. Julie gets a phone call from Nathan, who tells his mother that Saskia gave birth to a baby boy three weeks premature.
110	22	"Rewriting History"	Julie Rafter	Pino Amenta	Margaret Wilson	16 April 2013	1.619
As Dave and Julie's 30th wedding anniversary approaches, thoughts naturally turn to family and history. But Julie's view of the past is rocked by a surprise admission from Ted. Meanwhile, Julie also assumes their celebration will be a small affair, but little does she realise, Ben and Nathan have returned for the occasion! Coby is finding it hard to adjust to life in Remand, hiding his pain behind a veneer of black humour. Can he rise to Dave's challenge and put the time to good use? Final episode of James Stewart as Jake Barton

== Reception ==
Ratings for season five were significantly lower compared with previous seasons, attributed to two hiatuses during season four by the Seven network and competition from the Nine Network's The Voice. However, upon returning with episode 11 in 2013, the ratings once again increased.

=== Ratings ===
Episode	Title	Original airdate	Viewers^{1}	Nightly Rank	Weekly Rank
1; 5-01	"Answering the Call"	17 April 2012	1.384	7	17
2; 5-02	"Great Expectations"	24 April 2012	1.418	5	16
3; 5-03	"The Power of Words"	1 May 2012	1.355	6	19
4; 5-04	"The Things We Do for Love"	8 May 2012	1.405	6	13
5; 5-05	"Judgment Day"	15 May 2012	1.422	5	12
6; 5-06	"Secret Fears"	22 May 2012	1.459	5	18
7; 5-07	"The Great Escape"	29 May 2012	1.534	2	11
8; 5-08	"Unwritten Rules"	5 June 2012	1.369	5	17
9; 5-09	"A Kiss is Just a Kiss"	12 June 2012	1.590	3	9
10; 5–10	"Letting Go"	19 June 2012	1.557	2	11
11; 5–11	"The Right Time"	29 January 2013	1.613	2	4
12; 5–12	"Life's Surprises"	5 February 2013	1.762	2	6
13; 5–13	"Filling the Void"	12 February 2013	1.533	2	10
14; 5–14	"Bad Habits"	12 February 2013	1.533	2	10
15; 5–15	"Moments of Clarity"	19 February 2013	1.559	2	5
16; 5–16	"Displacement"	26 February 2013	1.609	2	6
17; 5–17	"Keeping Step"	5 March 2013	1.582	2	7
18; 5–18	"That Heady Rush"	12 March 2013	1.568	2	7
19; 5–19	"Got What It Takes"	19 March 2013	1.562	3	10
20; 5–20	"Weathering the Storm"	26 March 2013	1.411	1	3
21; 5–21	"Free to Choose"	9 April 2013	1.372	3	14
22; 5–22	"Rewriting History"	16 April 2013	1.619	3	10

s

^{1} Viewer numbers are based on preliminary OzTAM data for Sydney, Melbourne, Brisbane, Adelaide and Perth combined.
