= Packed to the Rafters season 6 =

Season of television series

Packed to the Rafters
- Season 6
- Season 6 DVD
- Starring: Rebecca Gibney; Erik Thomson; Angus McLaren with George Houvardas; Hannah Marshall; Brooke Satchwell; Jacob Allan; Zoe Cramond; Ben Mingay; Merridy Eastman; Fiona Spence and Michael Caton as Ted Taylor
- No. of episodes: 12

Release
- Original network: Seven Network
- Original release: 23 April – 2 July 2013

Season chronology
- ← Previous; Season 5

The sixth and final season of Packed to the Rafters, an Australian television drama series, premiered on 23 April 2013 on the Seven Network. The series is made up of only 12 episodes. The reduction of episodes is due to the series making way for Winners & Losers later in the year.

== Cast ==
=== Regular ===
- Rebecca Gibney as Julie Rafter
- Erik Thomson as Dave Rafter
- Angus McLaren as Nathan Rafter
- Hannah Marshall as Retta Schembri-Karandonis
- George Houvardas as Carbo Karandonis
- Brooke Satchwell as Frankie Calasso
- Jacob Allan as Matt Jennings
- Zoe Cramond as Emma MacKey
- Ben Mingay as Fergus "Buzz" Graham
- Merridy Eastman as Donna MacKey
- Michael Caton as Ted Taylor
- Fiona Spence as Eleanor McCormack (8 episodes)
- Ryan Corr as Coby Jennings (4 episodes)
- Jessica McNamee as Sammy Westaway (4 episodes)
- Hugh Sheridan as Ben Rafter (2 episodes)
- Jessica Marais as Rachel Rafter (1 episode)
- James Stewart as Jake Barton (1 episode)

=== Recurring and guest ===
- Hannah and Sabella Storey as Ruby Rafter
- Lauren Clair as Saskia Clark Rafter
- Jacinta Stapleton as Carla Calasso
- Sarah Chadwick as Trish Westaway
- Tom O'Sullivan as Craig/Logan
- Harry and Leo Lucas as Edward Rafter
- Molly Meldrum as himself
- Narek Arman as Jackson Radovich
- Julie Hamilton as Louise Taylor

==== Casting ====
Hugh Sheridan is committed to at least two episodes. Jessica McNamee will also return in season 6 as Sammy Westaway. Jessica Marais will briefly reprise her role of Rachel Rafter in season six. Fiona Spence joined the cast as Eleanor McCormack.

== Production ==
Packed to the Rafters was renewed for a sixth season on 16 May 2012. The reduced number of episodes meant less filming for the cast, however rumours began to circulate that the show had been axed when the Rafter house went up for sale. However, the house failed to sell.

It was announced in TV Week that the sixth season of Packed to the Rafters would be the last, with Hugh Sheridan stating: "It's emotional letting go of Rafters – for all of us. It was such an amazing chapter in Aussie TV. I'm really proud we all came back together to send it off." The series finale of Rafters will air later in 2013. However, Channel Seven revealed that scripts for the seventh season are in development and that while Frankie, Buzz, Coby and Ben won't be back, Julie definitely will be. A spokesperson also announced that there is no way they would bring such a wonderful story to a close.

It was later confirmed by TV Week that Packed to the Rafters has been cancelled and would finish in July with a big two-hour season finale, which would see the return of Hugh Sheridan, Jessica Marais, Ryan Corr, Jessica McNamee and James Stewart. Rebecca Gibney said, "The cast, writers and producers have always said that we wanted to keep Rafters as one of the most-watched shows on TV. If we ever felt like we were losing too many cast members, we needed to end it on a high. We can say season six winds up an aspect of the Rafter family and there is a sense of finality to it."

It was later said that while Packed to the Rafters is dead as a series, it will definitely return. While the format in which it will return is currently unknown, it is speculated to be several 90-minute telemovies or a 6-part miniseries. A Channel Seven spokesperson told The Age, "The series is expected to end in July and a new storyline nutted out, with no production expected to take place for at least a year. The actors will be given a prolonged break to pursue other projects." It is understood that the setting for Packed to the Rafters will change quite significantly to move the family's story forward.

== Episodes ==
No. overall	No. in season	Title	Narrator	Directed by	Written by	Original release date	Australian viewers (millions)
111	1	"High Hopes"	Julie Rafter	Pino Amenta	Jeff Truman	23 April 2013	1.527
Julie is over the moon when Nathan is scheduled to return home, but when Ted doesn't show up, Dave has to go get him from the airport. The new sparky – and Frankie's old friend – Buzz who takes an immediate liking to Emma. Donna decides to hire Craig again for the night. Craig runs into Emma and begins juggling Donna and Emma – mother and daughter. Ted returns to his old house and reunites with ex-lover Eleanor McCormack. Carbo, Retta and Emma are having trouble with their shop and they decide to take out an ad in Julie's newspaper. First appearance of Fiona Spence and Ben Mingay as Eleanor McCormack and Buzz Graham
112	2	"First Time for Everything"	Nathan Rafter	Pino Amenta	Marieke Hardy	30 April 2013	1.319
Nathan is working hard to build a solid base for Saskia & Edward in Australia and accepts a job offer despite its obvious shortfalls. Saskia is excited to be joining him, but little does Nathan know, for the first time in their married life, Saskia is keeping something from him. Meanwhile, Emma is quietly giddy at the prospect of her blossoming romance with Craig.
113	3	"Setting Limits"	Dave Rafter	Marcus Cole	Boaz Stark	7 May 2013	1.301
When new employee Buzz brings his wayward son Jackson to a work site, Dave begins to suspect his good nature is being taken advantage of. Meanwhile, Donna is mortified when she learns that both she and Emma have been played by Craig. Donna tries to avoid telling Emma, but she can't hide the truth forever, setting up an impending confrontation like no other.
114	4	"Secret Women's Business"	Julie Rafter	Marcus Cole	Kim Wilson	14 May 2013	1.297
Rocked after confronting escort Craig over his duplicitous ways, Donna calls on Julie for support, and the two women admit they're not coping as well as they pretend. Meanwhile, having found a place to rent, Nathan has done all he can to prepare for the arrival of his wife and baby, but when he gets to the airport, all the planning in the world could not prepare him for what he finds.
115	5	"Reality Checks"	Nathan Rafter	Samantha Lang	Abe Pogos	21 May 2013	1.438
An exhausted Nathan arrives in London looking for Saskia and baby Edward, desperate to find out why his wife never arrived in Sydney as planned, and the answer changes his life forever. Back in Sydney, Julie's concern for Nathan is exacerbated by Ted's continuing decline, which is clearly accelerating when Julie witnesses him confusing Eleanor for her mother. Return episode of Jessica McNamee as Sammy Westaway
116	6	"Manning Up"	Ted Taylor	Samantha Lang	Alison Boleyn	28 May 2013	1.224
As he struggles being a single father – and with no sign of Saskia's return – Nathan begins to feel ashamed. Retta struggles with the idea of parenthood and secretly begins taking the pill. Ted becomes more addled and makes a shocking decision after stating that his affair with Eleanor was a 'stupid mistake' and mistaking Retta for his late wife, Louise and kissing her.
117	7	"Taking Stock"	Carbo Karadonis	Jean-Pierre Mignon	Martin McKenna	4 June 2013	1.344
Carbo is happy with where his life is and all he wants for his birthday is a romantic night with Retta – just the two of them. But Retta has been making plans to throw a giant surprise party. And when Carbo discovers she's been lying to him over something as fundamental as having a child, its shaping up to be one hell of a party... Return episode of Ryan Corr as Coby Jennings
118	8	"Damage Control"	Dave Rafter	Jean-Pierre Mignon	David Lawrance	11 June 2013	1.326
Dave's enduring belief that nothing is beyond repair is put to the test when a crisis envelops the Rafter family. Frankie visits Coby in prison and after some initial awkwardness, they fall back into their usual, easy banter. But any hope Frankie has about their future is sidelined when she discovers that someone else has feelings for her. Having had no contact from Buzz, Emma is left wondering if she know that Buzz is actually paralysed by his feelings for Emma.
119	9	"Role Reversals"	Julie Rafter	Lynn Hegarty	Hamilton Budd and Kim Wilson	18 June 2013	1.250
Julie and Dave raise the difficult topic of nursing homes with Ted, and while he initially digs his heels in, a potentially serious accident forces him to acknowledge that he's becoming a danger to himself and others. Frankie is juggling a visit from older sister Carla and once again, unresolved family issues loom large. After an intense build-up, Buzz and Emma finally get together, but when Buzz is surprised by something he finds in Jackson's schoolbag, he realises he has no idea how to juggle being a dad with a new relationship.
120	10	"Head vs Heart"	Dave Rafter	Lynn Hegarty	Rick Held	25 June 2013	1.377
It's a matter of head versus heart as Julie and Dave wrestle with their decision to sell their beloved family home. When push comes to shove will they be able to go through with it? Jackson, miserable living with his mum and her new boyfriend, fishes to move in with Buzz. Matt, in the middle of a drought, has a lucky break – an invite to record some songs with a band. Unfortunately, nerves get the better of him and he blows his big chance. Frankie comes to the rescue with a surprising solution and Matt's drought is finally broken, in more ways than one...
121	11	"Centre of the Universe"	Julie Rafter	Lynn-Maree Danzey	Marieke Hardy	2 July 2013	1.584
Ben's return rattles Emma and she admits she wants to be with Buzz and give him a chance. Donna goes head to head with Trish over the cook. Coby is released from prison after good behaviour and him and Frankie reconcile. Matt moves out. Ted continues to plunge deeper and deeper into the claws of dementia. Sammy returns and her and Nathan plan to raise Edward as friends. Julie and Dave decide to rent a house instead of buy one. Retta discovers that – despite being on the pill – she is pregnant. Return episode of Hugh Sheridan as Ben Rafter
122	12	"Packing Up the Rafters"	Julie Rafter	Lynn-Maree Danzey	Margaret Wilson	2 July 2013	1.585
A video diary is constructed for Julie and Dave as they prepare to leave. Donna begins a relationship with her chef, Garry. Eleanor promises to look after Ted, after he finally recognises Julie again. Sammy, Nathan and Ben become a family unit and raise baby Edward together. Coby and Frankie begin dating, and continue Rafter Electrical. Matt is signed onto Molly Meldrum's record label. Carbo becomes the manager of a car sales shop and he and Retta get the assurance of a healthy baby. Emma and Buzz continue their romance. Rachel and Jake settle down in New York and get engaged. Julie and Dave begin an around-the-country trip in their kombi van. We hope you're as happy as we have been. Love Dave and Julie Rafter Return episode of Jessica Marais and James Stewart as Rachel Rafter and Jake Barton

== Reception ==
=== Ratings ===
Episode	Title	Original airdate	Viewers^{1}	Nightly Rank	Weekly Rank
1; 6–01	"High Hopes"	23 April 2013	1.527	3	12
2; 6–02	"First Time for Everything"	30 April 2013	1.319	2	18
3; 6–03	"Setting Limits"	7 May 2013	1.301	2	15
4; 6–04	"Secret Women's Business"	14 May 2013	1.297	4	17
5; 6–05	"Reality Checks"	21 May 2013	1.438	1	7
6; 6–06	"Manning Up"	28 May 2013	1.224	5	20
7; 6–07	"Taking Stock"	4 June 2013	1.344	2	18
8; 6–08	"Damage Control"	11 June 2013	1.326	2	18
9; 6–09	"Role Reversals"	18 June 2013	1.250	3	23
10; 6–10	"Head vs Heart"	25 June 2013	1.377	4	19
11; 6–11	"Centre of the Universe"	2 July 2013	1.584	2	9
12; 6–12	"Packing Up the Rafters"	2 July 2013	1.585	1	8
