= Packed to the Rafters =

Australian television series (2008–2013)

- Genre: Comedy; Drama
- Created by: Bevan Lee
- Developed by: Jo Porter; Anthony Ellis
- Narrated by: Various
- Country of origin: Australia
- Original language: English
- No. of series: 6
- No. of episodes: 122 (list of episodes)

Production
- Executive producers: John Holmes; Julie McGauran
- Producers: Jo Porter (Seasons 1–4); Chris Martin-Jones (Seasons 4–5); Bill Hughes (Seasons 6)
- Running time: 42 minutes
- Production company: Seven Productions

Original release
- Network: Seven Network
- Release: 26 August 2008 – 2 July 2013

Packed to the Rafters is an Australian family-oriented comedy drama television program which premiered on the Seven Network on Tuesday 26 August 2008 at 8:30 pm. The show continued on Tuesdays in this timeslot for its entire run. The drama series features a mix of lighthearted comedy woven through the plot. It revolves around the Rafter family facing work pressures and life issues, while also tackling serious social issues. The Logie award winning series was the highest rating to screen on the Seven Network in 2008, and the show was consistently among the top 5 shows of the year throughout its run in Australia.

TV Week announced 2013 that the sixth series of Packed to the Rafters would be the last, with Hugh Sheridan stating, "It's emotional letting go of Rafters – for all of us. It was such an amazing chapter in Aussie TV. I'm really proud we all came back together to send it off." The two-hour finale of Rafters aired on 2 July 2013, and saw the return of Hugh Sheridan, Jessica Marais, Ryan Corr, Jessica McNamee and James Stewart. Rebecca Gibney said, "The cast, writers and producers have always said that we wanted to keep Rafters as one of the most-watched shows on TV. If we ever felt like we were losing too many cast members, we needed to end it on a high. We can say season six winds up an aspect of the Rafter family and there is a sense of finality to it."

A sequel series Back to the Rafters was released on Amazon Prime Video in 2021.

== Overview ==
=== The first season (2008) ===
The first season premiered on 26 August 2008. The season finale aired 24 March 2009. Season one's storylines included:

- Julie and Dave's 25th wedding anniversary
- Rachel and Nathan & Sammy moving back home
- Ben moving in with Carbo and getting a new flatmate, Mel
- An amateur porn video of Rachel and Daniel released
- Ben and Mel sleeping together and eventually dating
- Rachel's pregnancy and subsequent abortion
- Carbo and Chrissy's forbidden relationship
- Ted moving on from late wife Louise
- The discovery that Julie is pregnant

=== The second season (2009) ===
The second season premiered on 30 June 2009. The season finale aired 24 November 2009. Season two's storylines included:

- Julie's pregnancy and the birth of baby Ruby
- Ben's heart problems
- Dave meeting his birth mother Chel
- Rachel's romance with electrician (“sparky”) Jake Barton
- Carbo's relationship with his mother's best friend's daughter, Artie
- Chrissy's crush on Dave, the demise of her friendship with Julie, and her departure
- Nathan's infidelity and gambling problems
- Ben and Mel's engagement and marriage
- Dave's vasectomy
- Sammy leaving Nathan

=== The third season (2010) ===
The third season premiered on 29 June 2010. The season finale aired 16 November 2010. Season three's storylines included:

- Dave meeting his biological father, Tom Jennings
- Nathan and Sammy's separation and her subsequent departure
- Rachel's jealousy of baby sister Ruby
- Nathan donating a kidney to HIV-positive grandmother Chel
- Rachel's new job
- Ben and Mel's fertility troubles
- Carbo meeting a girl, Retta
- Julie making friends with Hamish, who develops a crush on her
- The Rafters meeting Tom's grandson, Coby
- Mel's death
- Chel's departure
- Ben and Nathan's holiday around Australia

=== The fourth season (2011–2012) ===
The fourth season premiered on 8 February 2011. The season finale aired 20 March 2012. Season four's storylines included:

- The return of Ben and Nathan
- Coby's artistic flare and his outing as an artist by Rachel
- The finalisation of Nathan and Sammy's divorce
- Rachel's departure to New York
- Carbo and Retta's secret marriage
- The development of a friendship between Julie and Donna
- Bree's arrival & her romance with Jake and departure
- Ben's relationship with Donna's daughter Emma
- Tom's departure
- The introduction of Matt, the half-brother of Dave
- Ruby's disappearance
- Ted's new lease on life and becoming a mentor to Cooper
- Nathan's departure

=== The fifth season (2012–2013) ===
The fifth season premiered on 17 April 2012. The season finale aired 16 April 2013. Season five's storylines included:

- The introductions of new electrician Frankie Calasso and Julie's boss Adam Goodman
- Coby and Frankie's tumultuous relationship
- The reappearance of Jake's father Jim and his subsequent death
- The end of Ben and Emma's relationship
- Dave's drunken kiss with Frankie and his subsequent marriage troubles
- Retta's pregnancy and miscarriage
- Ben's departure
- Ted's dementia diagnosis
- The fire in the Rafter household and its aftermath
- Emma moving in with Carbo and Retta
- The arrest of Coby after his assault on Donna's boyfriend (and Dave’s client) Duncan, leading to Coby’s imprisonment and subsequent departure
- Nathan's marriage to Saskia and the birth of their son Edward
- The brief return of Nathan and Ben
- Jake's departure
- Julie and Dave's 30th wedding anniversary

=== The sixth season (2013) ===
The sixth and final season premiered on 23 April 2013. The series finale aired 2 July 2013. Season six's storylines included:

- The arrival of new sparky and Frankie's old friend Buzz Graham
- Ted's reunion with ex-lover Eleanor McCormack
- Matt moving in with Frankie
- Carbo, Retta and Emma struggling with their florist store
- Buzz taking a liking to Emma
- Emma dating Logan/Craig who has been juggling between Donna and her
- Buzz's son Jackson visiting his dad when he is working and get to know the others
- The sudden death of a customer of Dave Rafter Electrical who was fond of Frankie and Frankie taking care of his greenhouse
- Dave coaching the cricket team
- Nathan calling Sammy for help in his visit to London to look for Saskia
- Saskia cheating on Nathan and her sleep deprivation
- Retta pregnant
- Jake and Rachel getting engaged
- Dave and Julie's holiday around Australia

== Cast ==
=== Main ===
Actor	Character	Season						
Actor	Character	1	2	3	4	5	6	Back to the Rafters
Rebecca Gibney	Julie Rafter	Main	Main	Main	Main	Main	Main	Main
Erik Thomson	Dave Rafter	Main	Main	Main	Main	Main	Main	Main
Michael Caton	Ted Taylor	Main	Main	Main	Main	Main	Main	Main
Hugh Sheridan	Ben Rafter	Main	Main	Main	Main	Main	Guest	Main
Angus McLaren	Nathan Rafter	Main	Main	Main	Main	Guest	Main	Main
Jessica Marais	Rachel Rafter	Main	Main	Main	Main		Guest	
Georgina Haig	Rachel Rafter							Main
Jessica McNamee	Sammy Rafter	Main	Main	Main			Guest	
George Houvardas	Carbo Karandonis	Recurring	Recurring	Main	Main	Main	Main	Main
James Stewart	Jake Barton		Recurring	Main	Main	Main	Guest	
Zoe Ventoura	Melissa "Mel" Bannon Rafter	Recurring	Recurring	Main		Guest		
Ryan Corr	Coby Jennings		Guest	Recurring	Main	Main	Guest	
Hannah Marshall	Retta Schembri Karandonis			Recurring	Recurring	Main	Main	Guest
Merridy Eastman	Donna Mackey				Recurring	Recurring	Main	Guest
Zoe Cramond	Emma Mackey				Recurring	Recurring	Main	
Jacob Allan	Matt Jennings				Recurring	Recurring	Main	
Brooke Satchwell	Frankie Calasso					Recurring	Main	
Ben Mingay	Buzz Graham						Main	
Fiona Spence	Eleanor McCormack						Main	

=== Recurring ===
Actor	Role	Duration
Caroline Brazier	Chrissy Merchant	Season 1, Episode 1–2, 5, 7–14, 17–20; Season 2, Episode 1–3, 5, 12–13, 15, 17, 21 – 24 Episodes total
Justin Rosniak	Stuart "Warney" Warne	Season 1, Episode 1–2, 5, 7, 9, 13–16; Season 2, Episode 1–2, 10, 13, 15, 16, 19–22; Season 4, Episode 13, 17 – 21 Episodes total
Luke Pegler	Daniel Griggs	Season 1, Episode 1–6, 10; Season 2, Episode 18 – 8 Episodes total
Sarah Chadwick	Trish Westaway	Season 1, Episode 4, 7, 21, 22; Season 2, Episode 7–9, 13, 15–16, 19, 21; Season 3, Episode 1–2 – 14 Episodes total
Jerome Ehlers	Anthony Westaway	Season 1, Episode 4, 7, 21 – 3 Episodes total
Kate Fitzpatrick	Marjorie Stevens	Season 1, Episode 12–13, 17, 21–22; Season 2, Episode 2, 5–6 – 8 Episodes total
Dina Panozzo	Rita Karandonis	Season 1, Episode 18–20; Season 2, Episode 12; Season 4, Episode 1–3, 21 – 8 Episodes total
George Spartels	Theo Karandonis	Season 1, Episode 18–20; Season 4, Episode 21 – 4 Episodes total
Roy Billing	Ron Barrett	Season 1, Episode 1, 2, 7 – 3 Episodes total
Belinda Bromilow	Libby Sanders	Season 1, Episode 16, 20; Season 2, Episode 3–4, 11, 18; Season 3, Episode 18 – 7 Episodes total
Craig McLachlan	Steve Wilson	Season 1, Episode 8–9; Season 2, Episode 4, 15, 16; Season 4, Episode 22 – 6 Episodes total
Michael Booth	George Spiteri	Season 1, Episode 6, 16; Season 2, Episode 3, 4, 11, 18; Season 3, Episode 11 – 7 Episodes total
Ria Vandervis	Layla Soubrani	Season 2, Episode 4–5, 9–10, 12–13, 15 – 7 episodes total
Geoff Morrell	Tim Connelly	Season 2, Episode 2, 3, 4 – 3 Episodes total
Peter Bensley	Derek	Season 1, Episode 21; Season 2, Episode 2, 3; Season 3, Episode 10 – 4 Episodes total
Gillian Jones	Rachel "Chel" Warne	Season 2, Episode 10 – Season 3, Episode 21 – 25 Episodes total
Kristian Schmid	Alex Barton	Season 2, Episode 10–11, 14, 17–18; Season 3, Episode 6, 8–9, 11, 19; Season 4, Episode 8, 11–14, 16; Season 5, Episode 13–16 – 20 Episodes total
Mercia Deane-Johns	Grace Barton	Season 2, Episode 10–11, 14, 22; Season 3, Episode 1–2, 4, 6, 8; Season 4, Episode 11 – 10 Episodes total
Imogen Strong; Ruby & Emily Langley; Sabella & Hannah Storey	Ruby Rafter	Season 2, Episode 22; Season 3, Episode 1–14; Season 3, Episode 15 – present – 64 Episodes total
John Howard	Tom Jennings	Season 3, Episode 9, 12–13, 17, 18, 21 – Season 4, Episode 7–16, 20 – 17 episodes total
Camille Keenan	Bree Jennings	Season 4, Episode 11–22 – 11 Episodes total
Olivia Stambouliah	Voula Karandonis	Season 4, Episode 13, 21; Season 5, Episode 13–16 – 6 episodes total
Martin Lynes	Paul Morgan	Season 3, Episode 11, 14–15, 19–20; Season 4, Episode 3–7 – 10 Episodes total
Jarin Towney	Cooper	Season 4, Episode 20–21; Season 5, Episode 1–2, 10, 20–22; Season 6, Episode 4–5 – 10 Episodes total
Henry Nixon	Bryn Parry	Season 5, Episode 13–16 – 4 Episodes total
Andy Anderson	Jim Barton	Season 5, Episode 5–6, 15–16, 21 – 5 Episodes total
Samantha Tolj	Sian Parry	Season 5, Episode 3–7, 9–11, 13–16, 20 – 13 Episodes total
Lauren Clair	Saskia Clark Rafter	Season 5, Episode 12, 22; Season 6, Episode 2, 5, 11–12 – 6 Episodes total
Mark Lee	Duncan Galloway	Season 5, Episode 17–21 – 5 Episodes total
Coby Connell	Arna Fischer	Season 5, Episode 19–20 – 2 episodes total
Tom O'Sullivan	Craig/Logan	Season 5, Episode 22; Season 6, Episode 1–4 – 5 Episodes total
Cameron Daddo	Adam Goodman	Season 5, Episode 1, 3, 5–10 – 8 episodes total
Narek Arman	Jackson Radovich	Season 6, Episode 1, 3–5, 7–12 – 10 Episodes total
Jacinta Stapleton	Carla Calasso	Season 6, Episode 5, 8 – 2 Episodes total
Cassanne Ayre	Amanda	Seasons 1 & 2

=== Guests ===
Recurring and minor guest stars have included Melanie Vallejo, Lieschen Pogue, Denise Roberts, Phoebe Tonkin, Damian de Montemas, Malcolm Kennard, Andy Whitfield, Iain PF McDonald, Betty Lucas, Jonathon Dutton and Bernard Curry. Kate Ceberano and David Campbell have appeared as themselves.

== Production ==
The producer is Jo Porter, who alongside series creator Bevan Lee and writer Anthony Ellis are part of the same team responsible for the critically acclaimed series Always Greener, which also set ratings records.

The exterior shots of the Rafter house are filmed on location in Concord, while most house interiors were shot in studios at the Australian Technology Park, Eveleigh. Most of the other exterior shots are filmed at locations in Southern Sydney including establishing shots at Oatley and Lugarno shopping centres as well as the Captain Cook Bridge. The dinner venue in episode 1 was filmed at the St George Motor Boat Club at Sans Souci but the indoor scenes in the Chinese Restaurant were a set. The cricket match in episode 2 was filmed at Morrisons Park, Putney. The shopping centre, beach and park scenes in episode 5 were shot in Carss Park. Julie's “Night Club” scenes were shot near Concord, at the Epping Hotel.

== Home media ==
The entire series of Packed to the Rafters has been released on DVD on Region 4 in Australia from Universal Pictures Home Entertainment between 2009 and 2013. A complete series box set was released in 2013. Season two was the only season to receive a Blu-ray release, in addition to its DVD release.

Title	Release date	Episodes	No. of discs	Additional	Ref
The Complete Season 1	2 December 2009	22	6	Show: O-Ring packaging; Behind the scenes look at the show; Cast Interviews	
The Complete Season 2	3 November 2010	22	6	Show: O-Ring packaging; Also available on Blu-ray (released 3 November 2010)	
The Complete Season 3	20 April 2011	22	6	Show: O-Ring packaging; Interview with Hugh Sheridan & Zoe Ventoura about her character Mel's tragic death; Interviews with the cast discussing Season 3 storylines	
The Complete Seasons 1–3	20 April 2011	66	18	Show: See individual releases	
Season 4 – Part 1	3 November 2011	11	3	Show: Bon Voyage Rachel Rafter: The cast farewell a favourite character; The Bachelor Pad: James Stewart and Ryan Corr shed some light on bachelor living; Frenemies: Rebecca Gibney and Merridy Eastman give an insight into their surprising friendship; Moving On: Hugh Sheridan and Zoe Crammond talk about life after Mel; Extended Family: Camille Keenan introduces the newest member of the family, Bree Jennings; The Secret: George Houvardas and Hannah Marshall chat about love, marriage and the secret	
Season 4 – Part 2	28 March 2012	11	3	Show: A Big Greek Wedding Featurette; George Houvardas, Hannah Marshall and Dina Panozzo, give an insight into the big day with contributions from Rebecca Gibney, Erik Thomson, Angus McLaren, Camille Keenan, James Stewart, Ryan Corr, Hugh Sheridan, and Zoe Cramond; Tricks of the Trade Featurette; James Stewart and Ryan Corr share the secrets of acting; Naughty but Nice Featurette; Erik Thomson and Angus McLaren chat about the filming of their risqué scenes	
The Complete Season 4	28 March 2012	22	6	Show: O-Ring packaging; Bon Voyage Rachel Rafter: The cast farewell a favourite character; The Bachelor Pad: James Stewart and Ryan Corr shed some light on bachelor living; Frenemies: Rebecca Gibney and Merridy Eastman give an insight into their surprising friendship; Moving On: Hugh Sheridan and Zoe Crammond talk about life after Mel; Extended Family: Camille Keenan introduces the newest member of the family, Bree Jennings; The Secret: George Houvardas and Hannah Marshall chat about love, marriage and the secret; A Big Greek Wedding Featurette; Tricks of the Trade Featurette; Naughty but Nice Featurette	
The Complete Season 5	2 May 2013	22	6	Show: Access All Areas with Ryan Corr	
The Complete Season 6	7 November 2013	12	3	Show: The Cast Remembers	
The Complete Series	7 November 2013	122	33	Show: See individual releases	
Collection One: Seasons 1–3	20 April 2022	66	18	Show: TBA	
Collection Two: Seasons 4–6	20 July 2022	56	15	Show: TBA	

== Soundtrack ==
=== Volume 1 ===
Packed to the Rafters: The Soundtrack

Soundtrack album by Various Artists
- Released: 29 November 2008
- Length: 55:44
- Language: English
- Label: Warner Music

Packed to the Rafters: The Soundtrack was released on 29 November 2008. It has peaked at No. 7 on the Australian ARIA Albums Chart. It has since gone triple certified Platinum, selling in excess of 170,000 copies. The songs "I'm Yours" and "Rock & Roll" have been heavily used in promotional advertising for the series.

==== Track listing ====
1. Jason Mraz – "I'm Yours"
2. Gabriella Cilmi – "Sweet About Me"
3. Josh Pyke – "Memories and Dust"
4. Ben Lee – "Love Me Like the World Is Ending"
5. Kahn Brothers – "Stronger Together"
6. Lisa Mitchell – "Neopolitan Dreams"
7. The Cat Empire – "Fishies"
8. Old Man River – "La"
9. José González – "Down the Line"
10. James Reyne – "Reckless"
11. Alex Lloyd – "Same Day"
12. Lior – "Burst Your Bubble"
13. Jenny Morris – "Street of Love"
14. Mark Sholtez – "Love Me for the Cool"
15. Abby Dobson – "It's Only Love"
16. Eric Hutchinson – "Rock and Roll"

==== Certifications ====
Region	Certification	Certified units/sales
Australia (ARIA)	Platinum	70,000^{^}
^{^} Shipments figures based on certification alone.

=== Volume 2 ===
Packed to the Rafters: The Soundtrack Volume 2

Soundtrack album by Various Artists
- Released: 18 September 2009
- Language: English
- Label: Warner Music

Packed to the Rafters: The Soundtrack Volume 2 was released on 18 September 2009. It has peaked at No. 30 on the Australian ARIA Albums Chart.

==== Track listing ====
1. Latch Key Kid – "Good Times"
2. Lisa Mitchell – "Coin Laundry"
3. Empire of the Sun – "We Are the People"
4. Ben Lee – "Birds and Bees"
5. Eric Hutchinson – "You Don't Have to Believe Me"
6. Bob Evans – "Don't You Think It's Time?"
7. Kylie Auldist – "Just Say"
8. James Grehan – "Hold On"
9. Matt Costa – "Miss Magnolia"
10. Mark Sholtez – "Too Late for Heroes"
11. Lior – "This Old Love"
12. Whitley – "Lost in Time"
13. King Curly – "Little Arrows"
14. Sarah Blasko – "Perfect Now"
15. Abby Dobson – "Horses"
16. Rick Price – "Have Yourself a Merry Little Christmas"

=== Volume 3 ===
Packed to the Rafters: The Soundtrack Volume 3

Soundtrack album by Various Artists
- Released: 4 March 2011
- Language: English
- Label: Sony Music Entertainment

Packed to the Rafters: The Soundtrack Volume 3 was released on 4 March 2011.

==== Track listing ====
1. Uncle Kracker – "Smile"
2. Olly Murs – "Please Don't Let Me Go"
3. The Potbelleez – "Hello"
4. Michael Franti & Spearhead featuring Cherine Anderson – "Say Hey (I Love You)"
5. Little Birdy – "Brother"
6. Passion Pit – "Little Secrets"
7. The Cat Empire – "So Many Nights"
8. Kisschasy – "Generation Why"
9. Sarah Blasko – "We Won't Run"
10. Missy Higgins – "Warm Whispers"
11. Bertie Blackman – "Thump"
12. Fatboy Slim – "The Rockafeller Skank"
13. Sally Seltmann – "Harmony to My Heart Beat"
14. Leroy Lee – "Mountain Song"
15. Mark Sholtez – "This Perfect Day"
16. Angus & Julia Stone – "Hush"
17. Daniel Merriweather – "Red"
18. Sia – "I Go to Sleep"
19. Holly Throsby – "Now I Love Someone"
20. The Easybeats – "Wedding Ring"

== Reception ==
=== Critical response ===
Packed to the Rafters has received positive critical response from reviewers. In reviewing the pilot, David Knox of TV Tonight underlined that whilst the series's tone was "predominantly light", Rafters "also features some darker, more successful moments". The Age's Jim Schembri called Rafters a "superbly sculpted series about suburban class warfare", noting that in his opinion, the series was "one of the most enjoyable, finely honed locally produced TV dramas we've seen in ages", applauding the dialogue that "crackles with wit and energy". Season 2 received an equal amount of outflowing positivity, with Michael Lallo discovering that "Rafters "lighthearted" tone acts as a cloak, allowing it to address controversial topics without making viewers feel they're being lectured. The result is a feel-good series that's meaty and satisfying".

Of the series's characters, Michael Idato of The Sydney Morning Herald found an "elegance to the performances", going on to further applaud the "gentle, engaging, emotional dynamics" of the characters interactions with each other that also managed to both "enhance its charm and believability at the same time".

=== Awards and nominations ===
==== TV Week Logie Awards ====
The show was nominated for forty two Logie Awards and won thirteen.

Year	Nominee	Award	Result
2009	Packed to the Rafters	Most Popular Drama Series	Won
2009	Rebecca Gibney	Gold Logie for Most Popular Personality on Australian TV	Won
2009	Erik Thomson	Most Popular Actor	Nominated
2009	Rebecca Gibney	Most Popular Actress	Won
2009	Hugh Sheridan	Most Popular New Male Talent	Won
2009	George Houvardas	Most Popular New Male Talent	Nominated
2009	Jessica Marais	Most Popular New Female Talent	Won
2009	Packed to the Rafters	Most Outstanding Drama Series, Miniseries or Telemovie	Nominated
2009	Rebecca Gibney	Most Outstanding Actress	Nominated
2009	Jessica Marais	Most Outstanding New Talent	Won
2009	Hugh Sheridan	Most Outstanding New Talent	Nominated
2010	Packed to the Rafters	Most Popular Drama Series	Won
2010	Rebecca Gibney	Gold Logie for Most Popular Personality on Australian TV	Nominated
2010	Hugh Sheridan	Most Popular Actor	Won
2010	Erik Thomson	Most Popular Actor	Nominated
2010	Rebecca Gibney	Most Popular Actress	Won
2010	Jessica Marais	Most Popular Actress	Nominated
2010	James Stewart	Most Popular New Male Talent	Nominated
2010	Packed to the Rafters	Most Outstanding Drama Series, Miniseries or Telemovie	Nominated
2011	Packed to the Rafters	Most Popular Drama Series	Won
2011	Rebecca Gibney	Gold Logie for Most Popular Personality on Australian TV	Nominated
2011	Jessica Marais	Gold Logie for Most Popular Personality on Australian TV	Nominated
2011	Erik Thomson	Most Popular Actor	Nominated
2011	Hugh Sheridan	Most Popular Actor	Won
2011	Michael Caton	Most Popular Actor	Nominated
2011	Jessica Marais	Most Popular Actress	Nominated
2011	Rebecca Gibney	Most Popular Actress	Nominated
2011	Zoe Ventoura	Most Popular Actress	Nominated
2011	Ryan Corr	Most Popular New Male Talent	Nominated
2011	Hannah Marshall	Most Popular New Female Talent	Nominated
2011	Packed to the Rafters	Most Outstanding Drama Series, Miniseries or Telemovie	Nominated
2011	Erik Thomson	Most Outstanding Actor	Nominated
2011	Hugh Sheridan	Most Outstanding Actor	Nominated
2011	Ryan Corr	Most Outstanding New Talent	Nominated
2012
2012	Packed to the Rafters	Most Popular Drama Series	Won
2012	Erik Thompson	Most Popular Actor	Nominated
2012	Hugh Sheridan	Most Popular Actor	Won
2012	Rebecca Gibney	Most Popular Actress	Nominated
2012	Jessica Marais	Most Popular Actress	Nominated
2013	Packed to the Rafters	Most Popular Australian Drama	Nominated
2013	Hugh Sheridan	Most Popular Actor	Nominated
2013	Rebecca Gibney	Most Popular Actress	Nominated
2014	Hugh Sheridan	Most Popular Actor	Nominated
2014	Rebecca Gibney	Most Popular Actress	Nominated

==== AFI Awards ====
Packed to the Rafters was nominated for two AFI (now AACTA) Awards in 2009.

Year	Nominee	Award	Result
2009	Packed to the Rafters	Best Drama Series	Won
2009	Rebecca Gibney	Best Lead Actress in a Television Drama	Nominated

== Episodes and ratings ==
The average ratings for Season 1 in 2008 were 1,939,000 making it the No. 1 show of 2008 on Australian television. The second season of Packed to the Rafters averaged 1,881,000, ranking it as No. 2 for the 2009 year. The program has also been picked up by Irish broadcaster RTÉ and New Zealand's TV1 which aired the first season of Packed to the Rafters in early 2009. The series has also been sold to networks in South Africa, Belgium, The Netherlands, several Scandinavian countries, Italy and India.

=== Series ratings ===
Packed to the Rafters has been a solid performer in the ratings since its premiere. Most episodes have been the number one programme during prime time for the night since the series premiere and the show has remained in the top ten programs of the week. In 2008, the series was the highest rating regularly broadcast show with an average of 1,939,143 viewers per episode for the first fourteen episodes of season one which screened in 2008. The lower weekly rankings for seasons 5 and 6 are as a result of multiple episodes of single reality shows appearing as separate programs on the weekly list.

Season	# of Episodes	Timeslot	Season Premiere	Season Final	Peak Audience	Average Audience	Average Nightly Rank	Average Weekly Rank	Average Yearly Ranking
1	22	Tuesday 8:30 pm	26 August 2008	24 March 2009	2,067,000	1,904,364	No. 1	No. 2	No. 1
2	22	Tuesday 8:30 pm	30 June 2009	24 November 2009	2,185,000	1,881,045	No. 1	No. 2	No. 2
3	22	Tuesday 8:30 pm	29 June 2010	16 November 2010	2,335,000	1,895,571	No. 1	No. 2	No. 1
4	22	Tuesday 8:30 pm	8 February 2011	20 March 2012	2,011,000	1,769,364	No. 2	No. 3	No. 3
5	22	Tuesday 8:30 pm	17 April 2012	16 April 2013	1,762,000	1,508,714	No. 4	No. 11	No. 16
6	12	Tuesday 8:30 pm	23 April 2013	2 July 2013	1,585,000	1,381,000	No. 5	No. 15	No. 20

== Broadcast ==
Country	Channel	Year	Notes
Australia	Seven Network	26 August 2008 – 2 July 2013	Original channel
Australia	111 Greats (formerly 111 Hits)	2014	Reruns
Belgium (Flanders)	vtm	2008–	Subtitled in Dutch
Netherlands	NET 5	2009–	Subtitled in Dutch
New Zealand	TV One	7 July 2009–	Sunday 20:30
Ireland	RTÉ One	August 2009–	Season 4 premiered Sunday 4 August 2013; the season 4 finale aired 22 December 2013; Season 5 premiered 26 April 2014
South Africa	SET	2009–	
Italy	Joi	17 January 2010–	Sundays 21:00
Germany	Passion	11 November 2010–	Pay-TV; Dubbed in German
Germany	VOX	14 February 2011–	Free-TV; Dubbed in German
Malaysia	Astro	2010–	Sundays 21:00 via Australia Network
Portugal	AXN White	2010–	Coming Soon
Croatia	HRT	2011–	Subtitled in Croatian
Finland	TV5	2011–	Subtitled in Finnish
Hungary	Magyar Televízió	2011–	
Poland	Viacom Blink!	20 July 2011–	
Sweden	TNT7	2011–	
Bangladesh; India; Pakistan; Sri Lanka	Star World	December 2012–May 2013	With English Open Captions; Season 1 – Season 5
Falkland Islands	Falkland Islands Television Service	2012–	
United Kingdom	Amazon Prime Video	23 April 2019–October 2019	Entire series (first time in UK); currently unavailable
United States	Hulu Plus	2013	Entire series available for streaming

== Back to the Rafters ==
In September 2019, it was reported the cast members were in discussion to revive the series for a 2020 season under the working title "Back to the Rafters", however the series would not air on Seven Network, instead would be placed on Amazon Prime Video, which was confirmed in December 2019, and the return of Rebecca Gibney, Erik Thomson, Jessica Marais, Hugh Sheridan, Angus McLaren, Michael Caton and George Houvardas. Filming commenced in Sydney in 2020.

In February 2020, Jessica Marais dropped out of the series for personal reasons. In March 2020, it was announced Georgina Haig would take over the role of Rachel Rafter.

== See also ==
- Always Greener
