= Back to the Rafters =

- Genre: Drama; Comedy
- Created by: Bevan Lee
- Country of origin: Australia
- Original language: English
- No. of series: 1
- No. of episodes: 6

Production
- Executive producer: Julie McGauran
- Producer: Chris Martin-Jones
- Production company: Seven Studios

Original release
- Network: Amazon Prime Video
- Release: 17 September 2021

Related
- Packed to the Rafters (2008–2013)

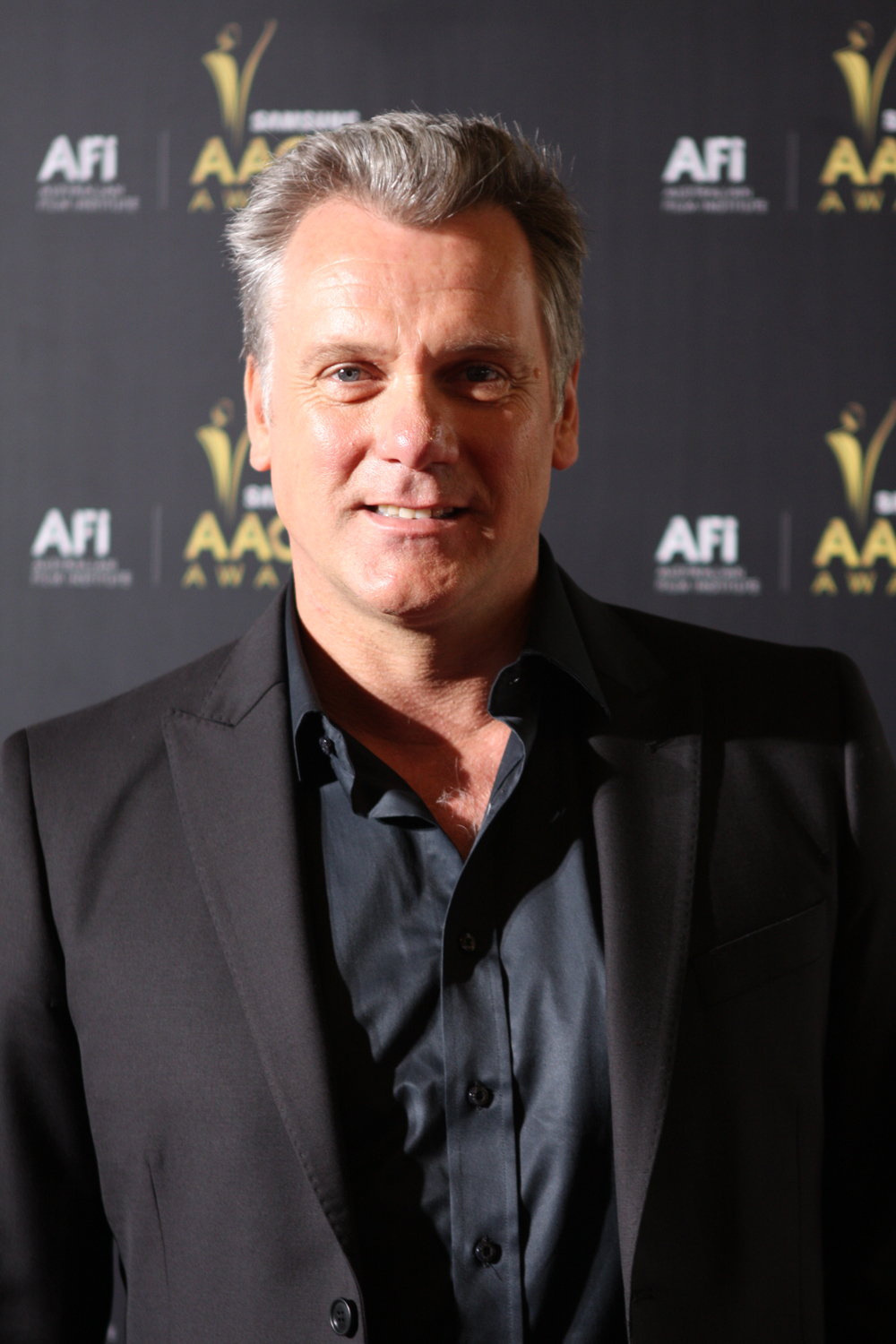
Erik Thompson

Back to the Rafters is an Australian family comedy-drama television series which premiered on the Amazon Prime Video on September 17, 2021. The series is a spin-off and sequel to Packed to the Rafters, which aired on Seven Network from 2008 to 2013.

In October 2021, the series was officially cancelled by Amazon after one season.

== Synopsis ==
Back to the Rafters is set six years after the end of Packed to the Rafters. Dave and Julie have created a new life in the country with youngest daughter Ruby, while the older Rafter children face new challenges and Grandpa Ted struggles to find his place. As Dave enjoys his new-found freedom, Julie must reconcile her responsibilities to the family.

== Production ==
In September 2019, it was reported the cast members were in discussion to revive the series for a 2020 season under the working title Back to the Rafters. The series will not air on Seven Network, instead it will be placed on Amazon Prime Video, which was confirmed in December 2019, along with the return of Rebecca Gibney, Erik Thomson, Jessica Marais, Hugh Sheridan, Angus McLaren, Michael Caton and George Houvardas. Filming commenced in Sydney in 2020.

In February 2020, Jessica Marais dropped out of the series for personal reasons. In March 2020, it was announced Georgina Haig would take over the role of Rachel Rafter.

Production of the series was stopped in March 2020 due to the COVID-19 pandemic. It resumed in September 2020 and filming was completed on 2 October 2020.

== Cast ==
=== Main ===
- Rebecca Gibney as Julie Rafter
- Erik Thomson as Dave Rafter
- Hugh Sheridan as Ben Rafter
- Angus McLaren as Nathan Rafter
- Georgina Haig as Rachel Rafter
- Willow Speers as Ruby Rafter
- HaiHa Le as Cassie Rafter
- Kasper Frost as Edward Rafter
- Michael Caton as Ted Taylor
- George Houvardas as Nick 'Carbo' Karandonis
- Aaron L. McGrath as Paddo Steel

=== Recurring and guests ===
- Libby Tanner as Tessa Blake (5 episodes)
- Bruce Spence as Charles Whiteman (4 episodes)
- Mercia Deane-Johns as Mrs Spade (2 episode)
- Hannah Marshall as Retta Schembri Karandonis (1 episode)
- Merridy Eastman as Donna Mackey (5 episodes)
- Ezekiel Simat as Justin Gavin (3 episodes)
- Rose Riley as Anna Davis (6 episodes)

== Episodes ==
No.	Title	Directed by	Written by	Original release date
1	"Kung Pao Chicken"	Jeremy Sims	Bevan Lee	17 September 2021
2	"Cross Currents"	Jeremy Sims	Bevan Lee	17 September 2021
3	"Issues Management"	Lynn Hegarty	Margaret Wilson	17 September 2021
4	"The Most Together One in the Family"	Lynn Hegarty	Trent Atkinson	17 September 2021
5	"Pounded"	Catherine Millar	Katherine Thomson	17 September 2021
6	"Pinch Me Linda"	Catherine Millar	Bevan Lee	17 September 2021

== Home media ==
It was announced by Via Vision Entertainment in May 2022 that they would be releasing the Back To The Rafters on DVD.

DVD name	Format	Ep #	Discs	Region 4 (Australia)	Special features	Distributors
Back To The Rafters (Season 01)	DVD	6	2	20 July 2022	N/A	Via Vision Entertainment & Madman Entertainment

== Reception ==
=== Accolades ===
For his performance of Ben, Sheridan received a nomination for Most Outstanding Supporting Actor at the Logie Awards.

=== Critical reception ===
Back to the Rafters was positively received by critics and fans. In a review for The Sydney Morning Herald, Karl Quinn gave the series a rating of 3½ and commented on its "welcome return", and that "Generally, I like my family sagas loaded with vitriol, scheming and skulduggery. Back to the Rafters is definitely not that. But much as I love a Succession or Game of Thrones or Arrested Development, I’m glad there’s still room for a Rafters too."

Daryl Sparkes of the website The Conversation stated that "I always found Packed to the Rafters to be honest and authentic. It was relatable because the issues, actions and dialogue of the characters were grounded in realism. He concluded with "this is the key to Rafters continued success. It takes the ordinary in our lives and makes it just a little bit more extraordinary on the screen. It's a great joy to go Back to the Rafters again, after all these years."

In a favourable review from James Croot of the New Zealand website Stuff, he wrote: "Returning to a series that had seemingly run its course eight years ago could have ended in disaster, but Lee has given this central duo a new stage and lease of life that just might provide enough dramatic tension, tears and laughs to make you fall in love with the Rafters, whether it be for the first time, or all over again."
