= Mark Sholtez =

Australian singer-songwriter

Mark Sholtez is an Australian singer-songwriter. His debut album, Real Street from 2006, has resulted in nominations for an ARIA Award and APRA Awards winning an APRA for 'Most Performed Jazz Work' for "Love Me for the Cool" in 2007. His follow-up album is titled The Distance Between Two Truths.

== Biography ==
Shortly after signing a deal with the U.S. label Verve Records, Sholtez recorded his debut album, Real Street, in New York City. The album's cast includes multiple Grammy-winning producer (and Verve Music Group chairman) Tommy LiPuma (Frank Sinatra, Diana Krall, Nat King Cole, George Benson, Barbra Streisand, Al Jarreau, Miles Davis) along with noted veteran engineer Al Schmitt and a prestigious cast of players that includes Christian McBride on bass, Rob Mounsey on keyboards, Geoffrey Keezer on piano, Bob Mann on guitar, Chris Potter on sax and Lewis Nash on drums.

Real Street was released in April 2006 and debuted in the ARIA Jazz and Blues chart at the number one position where it stayed for ten consecutive weeks. The same year, it was nominated for an ARIA Music Awards.

In 2007, having written three of the five songs nominated in the category of Most Performed Jazz Work, Sholtez's original composition "Love Me for the Cool" won him an APRA Awards.

His follow-up album The Distance Between Two Truths was recorded in LA with producer Larry Klein. The album features Larry Goldings on keyboards, David Piltch on bass, Doug Pettibone and Bruce Woodward on guitars, Brian MacLeod on drums and Kate Markowitz on backing vocals.

== Discography ==
=== Albums ===
List of albums, with selected details and chart positions
Title	Album details	Peak chart positions
Title	Album details	AUS
Real Street	Released: April 2006; Label: Vere (9875741); Format: CD	22
The Distance Between Two Truths	Released: July 2010; Label: Warner Music Australia (5249-80207-2); Format: CD	88

== Awards and nominations ==
=== ARIA Music Awards ===
The ARIA Music Awards is an annual awards ceremony that recognises excellence, innovation, and achievement across all genres of Australian music. They commenced in 1987.

Year	Nominee / work	Award	Result	Ref.
2006	Real Street	Best Jazz Album	Nominated	

=== APRA Awards ===
The APRA Awards are presented annually from 1982 by the Australasian Performing Right Association (APRA).

Year	Nominee / work	Award	Result
2007	"Complicated Woman"	Most Performed Jazz Work Overseas	Nominated
2007	"Dream About You"	Most Performed Jazz Work Overseas	Nominated
2007	"Love Me for the Cool"	Most Performed Jazz Work Overseas	Won
