= Luke Pegler =

Australian actor (born 1980)

- Born: 1980 (age 45–46); Perth, Western Australia, Australia
- Occupation: Actor
- Years active: 2001–present

Luke Pegler (born 1980) is an Australian actor who is known for Scott Wiper's The Condemned and Gregory Dark's See No Evil.

== Career ==
Pegler has starred in two WWE Films productions: The Condemned with Stone Cold Steve Austin, and See No Evil with Kane. Pegler appeared as Daniel Griggs in Packed to the Rafters from 2008 to 2009. The actor joined the cast of Rescue: Special Ops in 2010 as Gary Bing. In August 2011, it was announced Pegler had joined the cast of Neighbours for six weeks as Dane Canning. Pegler took over storylines planned for Chris Milligan's character Kyle Canning, after the actor snapped an Achilles tendon. Pegler wrapped his guest stint on 23 September.

In 2023, Pegler joined the filming for the second season of Foxtel drama The Twelve (Australian TV series).

In June 2024, Pegler joined the filming for the second season of Scrublands.

== Filmography ==
=== Film ===
Year	Title	Role	Notes
2003	Gettin' Square	Joey Wirth	Feature film
2005	Punch Drunk		Short film
2005	The Great Raid	CPFC Miller	Feature film
2006	See No Evil	Michael	Feature film
2007	The Condemned	Baxter	Feature film
2008	Fool's Gold	Young	Feature film
2016	Hacksaw Ridge	Milt 'Hollywood' Zane	Feature film
2018	Skinford: Chapter Two	The Hunter	
2018	Ladies in Black	Frank	Feature film

=== Television ===
Year	Title	Role	Notes
2001	Wild Kat	Alex	TV series
2008	The Strip	Simon Yeldham	TV series
2008–09	Packed to the Rafters	Daniel Griggs	TV series
2009	Sea Patrol	Hammil	TV series, episode: "Pearls Before Swine"
2009	All Saints	Jasper	TV series, episode: "Yesterday, Today and Tomorrow 2"
2010	Rescue Special Ops	Gary Bing	TV series
2010	Cops L.A.C.	Brad Chandler	TV series, episode: "Ladies' Night"
2011	Neighbours	Dane Canning	TV series: 21 episodes
2012	Spartacus: Vengeance	Marcus	TV series: 6 episodes
2012	Underbelly: Badness	Detective Luke Rankin	TV miniseries
2015	Home and Away	Sean Gleeson	TV series:10 episodes
2017	High Life	Lennon	TV series: 6 episodes
2018	Harrow	Kurt Calanna	TV series: 1 episode
2020	Operation Buffalo	Nick	TV series: 1 episode
2024	The Twelve	Dean Pearcey	TV series: 8 episodes
2025	Scrublands: Silver	Nick Poulos	TV series: 4 episodes
