= Dina Panozzo =

Australian actress

- Born: Dina Panozzo; 20 September 1958 (age 67); Australia
- Occupation: Actress
- Spouse: Phillip Tanner
- Children: 1
- Relatives: Oriana Panozzo (sister)

Dina Panozzo (born 20 September 1958) is an Australian-born actress of Italian descent.

== Early life ==
Panozzo was born on 20 September 1958. Her parents emigrated to Adelaide from northern Italy, on a ship called Queen Neptuna. Her mother was 19 and a housewife, her father a labourer and later a carpenter. Panozzo is the elder sister of actress Oriana Panozzo. Growing up in Adelaide in the 1970s, Panozzo became passionate about Adelaide's thriving amateur theatre scene, in particular, Adelaide Theatre Company.

== Career ==
Panozzo is best known for her regular roles in the television series Carla Cametti PD and Bed of Roses. She has also appeared in a recurring role in Packed to the Rafters and guest roles in many Australian series, including A Country Practice, Water Rats, and White Collar Blue. Panozzo also had regular roles in the short-lived comedy series Wedlocked and the soap opera Richmond Hill. Featured film roles include Black & White & Sex and Fistful of Flies.

Her theatre roles include Popular Front (Theatre Works, 1987), ABC (Belvoir Street Theatre, 1988), Sisters (Malthouse Theatre, 1991), S.O.S. Sex, Overkill and Salvation of the Soul (Belvoir Street Theatre, 1991), and A Little Like Drowning (Belvoir Street Theatre, 1992). She also wrote, co-directed and starred in Varda Che Bruta...Poretta which played in multiple venues from 1992 to 1994.

== Personal life ==
Panozzo is married to television producer Phillip Tanner. After all attempts to conceive ended in miscarriage, the couple adopted a two year old boy from Guatemala called Luis. In 2004, at the age of six, Luis had an award-winning Nickelodeon TV series, called Cooking for Kids with Luis, and caught the attention of Oprah Winfrey.

== Filmography ==
=== Film ===
Year	Film	Character	Type
1993	Bedevil	Voula	Feature film (segment: Lovin' the Spin I'm In)
1993	Just Desserts	Maria Stroppi	Film short
1996	Fistful of Flies	Grace Lupi	Feature film
1998	Let's Wait	Gina	Film short
2001	The Man Who Sued God	Italian Reporter	Feature film
2002	Mother of an Attitude		Film short
2004	Love's Brother	Zia Norman	Feature film
2011	The Man with Wings		Film short
2012	Black & White & Sex	Angie 6	Feature film
2020	Bloodshot Heart	Catherine	Feature film

=== Television ===
Year	Program	Character	Type
1983	The Sullivans		TV series, 1 episode
1983; 1984	Cop Shop	Marti Vickers (as Dena Panozzo)	TV series, episodes 555–556
1983; 1984	Carson's Law	Miss Refton / Anges Weston	TV series, 2 episodes
1984	City West	Lead role	TV series
1984	A Country Practice	Lily	TV series, 2 episodes
1984	Special Squad	Maria (as Dena Panozzo)	TV series, 1 episode
1988	Richmond Hill	Jill Warner	TV series, 59 episodes
1989	Mission: Impossible	Serena	TV series, 1 episode
1990	Acropolis Now!	Rosita	TV series, 1 episode
1992	G.P.	Rosie Tait	TV series, 1 episode
1994; 1996	Wedlocked	Susie Abruzzo	TV series, 11 episodes
1998	Wildside	Renata Cellini	TV series, 1 episode
2000	Water Rats	Antonella Luvece	TV series, 2 episodes
2001	Mum's The Word	Herself	TV series, 1 episode
2001	Head Start	Vivienne	TV miniseries, 1 episode
2003	White Collar Blue	Theresa Nitti	TV series, 1 episode
2008–2010	Bed of Roses	Gemma O'Reilly	TV series, 14 episodes
2009	Carla Cametti PD	Angela Cametti	TV series, 6 episodes
2009; 2012	Packed to the Rafters	Rita Karandonis	TV series, 8 episodes
2010	Underbelly	Samira Kanaan	TV series, 2 episodes
2013–2014	A Place to Call Home	Carla Poletti	TV series, 11 episodes
2024	Last Days of the Space Age	Fran	TV series, 7 episodes
2024	Darby and Joan	Gabriella	TV series, 1 episode

== Theatre ==
=== As actor ===
Year	Title	Role	Venue / Co.
1976	Johnny Castilhino		Sheridan Theatre, Adelaide with Adelaide Theatre Group
1976–77	Jack the Ripper	Martha Tabram / Rosie Wunmore	Sheridan Theatre, Adelaide, Space Theatre, Adelaide with STCSA & Adelaide Theatre Group
1978	The Winter’s Tale		Sheridan Theatre, Adelaide with Adelaide Theatre Group
1980	Sadie and Neco	Sadie	VCA, Melbourne
1981	Dimentos	Lydia	VCA, Melbourne
1981	The Three Sisters	Olga	Performance Studio One, Melbourne
1982	Tales from Land Shut		
1983	Don't Stand on Ceremony		
1984	Il Magnifico		Seymour Centre, Sydney
1984	The Time of Your Life		
1985	Exploring Shakespeare		
1985	Richard III		Playhouse, Adelaide with STCSA
1985	Scenes Big and Little		Playhouse Adelaide with STCSA
1985	Beatland		Playhouse Adelaide with STCSA
1985	Muse of Fire		Playhouse Adelaide with STCSA
1985	On the Razzle	Christopher	Playhouse Adelaide with STCSA
1985	The Touch of Silk	Jeanne	Playhouse Adelaide with STCSA
1985	Peter Pan	Wendy Darling	Playhouse Adelaide with STCSA
1986	Dreams in an Empty City		Playhouse Adelaide with STCSA for Adelaide Festival
1987	Popular Front	Marguerita	Theatre Works, Melbourne
1987	The Impostor	Zhou Minghua	St Martins Youth Arts Centre, Melbourne, with Playbox Theatre Company for Spoleto Melbourne Festival of the Arts
1988	ABC		Belvoir St Theatre, Sydney
1990	Spanish Cuisine		
1991	Sisters	Sylvie	Malthouse Theatre, Melbourne, Monash University, Melbourne, with Playbox Theatre Company
1991	S.O.S. Sex, Overkill and Salvation of the Soul		Belvoir St Theatre, Sydney
1991	Love and Magic in Mama's Kitchen		Belvoir St Theatre, Sydney
1992	A Little Like Drowning		Belvoir St Theatre, Sydney, with Teatar Di Migma
	Nicaragua		Belvoir St Theatre, Sydney
1993	The Garden of Granddaughters	Fay	Wharf Theatre, Sydney, Monash University, Ford Theatre, Geelong, Her Majesty's Theatre, Ballarat, Malthouse Theatre, Melbourne with Playbox Theatre Company & STC
1993	Belvoir Street Revues		Belvoir St Theatre, Sydney
1993–94	Varda Che Bruta...Poretta (Look How Ugly She is...Poor Thing)	One-woman show	Stables Theatre, Sydney for Festival for Carnivale Sydney, Universal Theatre, Melbourne, Space Theatre, Adelaide with STCSA for International Women’s Playwright Conference with Performance Space
1996	A Progressive Dinner: Promiscuous Spaces 1: Table Talk	Speaker	Performance Space, Sydney
1998	Emma		Bridge Theatre, Sydney with Theatre South
1999	Monster Mouth		Open City & Playworks
2003	Cantata	Dancer	Acton St Theatre, Canberra with Stopera
2004	The Vagina Monologues		University of Sydney
2004	Kimberly Akimbo	Patti	Ensemble Theatre, Sydney
2007	From Door to Door	Bessie	Seymour Centre, Sydney
2007	Anna in the Tropics	Ophelia	Belvoir St Theatre, Sydney, with Theatron Group
2015	The Plot	Lily	Mantouridion Theatre, Sydney with Skylight Productions & Katahanas Productions
2018	The Gods of Strangers	Assunta	Northern Festival Centre, Port Pirie, Keith Michell Theatre, Adelaide, Dunstan Playhouse, Adelaide with STCSA
2018	The Shifting Heart	Momma Bianchi	Seymour Centre, Sydney
2022	The Life That I Gave You		Studio Theatre, Sydney
2022	Set Piece		Carriageworks, Sydney, for Sydney Festival & Melbourne Rising Festival

=== As writer/director ===
Year	Title	Role	Venue / Co.
1993–94	Varda Che Bruta...Poretta (Look How Ugly She is...Poor Thing)	Writer / co-director	Stables Theatre, Sydney for Festival for Carnivale Sydney, Universal Theatre, Melbourne, Space Theatre, Adelaide with STCSA for International Women’s Playwright Conference with Performance Space
1999	La Voix Humaine / The Telephone	Playwright / director	Art Gallery of South Australia

== Awards and nominations ==
Year	Nominated work	Award	Category	Result
1992	The Touch of Silk	South Australian Critic Awards	Best Actress Award	Won
1996	Fistful of Flies	Gijón International Film Festival	Best Actress Award	Won
1997	Fistful of Flies	Sochi International Film Festival	Best Actress Award	Won
2004	Kimberly Akimbo	Glugs Theatrical Awards	Norman Kessell Memorial Award for Best Actress for an Outstanding Performance	Won
2011	Bed of Roses	Equity Ensemble Awards	Outstanding Performance by an Ensemble in a Drama Series	Nominated
