= Zoë Ventoura =

Australian actress

- Born: Perth, Western Australia
- Occupation: Actress
- Notable work: Packed to the Rafters
- Spouse: Daniel MacPherson (m. 2015; sep. 2020)
- Children: 1

Zoë Ventoura is an Australian actress. She played Melissa Rafter in Packed to the Rafters from 2008 to 2010. The character's death earned Ventoura a nomination for the Logie Award for Most Popular Actress in 2011. That same year, Ventoura starred alongside actor Daniel MacPherson, whom she later married, in Wild Boys. Other roles include Miki Mavros in the television comedy series Kick and Sonya Hyde in Hyde and Seek. Ventoura joined the recurring cast of Home and Away as Alex Neilson in 2019.

== Early and personal life ==
Ventoura attended Penrhos College in Perth, Western Australia.

In December 2014, Ventoura became engaged to longtime partner and Wild Boys co-star Daniel MacPherson, and they married in Noosa in November 2015. The couple have one child, a son born in December 2019 named Austin Xavier. A year later, Ventoura announced that the pair had separated.

== Career ==
Ventoura portrayed Melissa Rafter (née Bannon) in Packed to the Rafters. Her shock on-screen death was the highest rating episode of the hugely popular series, and gained her a nomination for the Logie Award for Most Popular Actress in 2011. That same year, Ventoura starred alongside actor Daniel MacPherson in the Seven Network colonial drama Wild Boys.

Ventoura is also known for starring as Miki Mavros in the SBS television comedy series Kick, for which she earned two Logie nominations. She has also had a number of roles in the theatre, film and other television series such as Last Man Standing, US feature films Drive Hard, Fatal Honeymoon and the horror movie See No Evil. She appeared in Disney's Pirates of the Caribbean: Dead Men Tell No Tales, and The Osiris Child: Science Fiction Volume One by director Shane Abbess. In 2016, Ventoura starred opposite Matt Nable as Sonya Hyde in the Australian thriller, Hyde and Seek for Channel 9.

Ventoura joined the cast of television soap opera Home and Away as Alex Neilson in April 2019 during the show's thirty-second season. She made her first on-screen appearance on 22 August 2019.

In September 2020, it was announced that Ventoura had joined the cast of Nine Network drama series Doctor Doctor for its fifth season, which aired in 2021.

== Filmography ==
=== Television ===
Year	Title	Role	Notes
1996	Sweat	Dancer	Season 1, episode 26
2005	Last Man Standing	Adele	2 episodes
2007	Kick	Miki Mavros	13 episodes
2008–2013	Packed to the Rafters	Melissa Bannon	Seasons 1–3 (65 episodes)
2011	Wild Boys	Mary Barrett	10 episodes
2012	Fatal Honeymoon	Joanna	TV movie
2013	Knockin' on Doors		Season 1, episode 2
2014-2017	Love Child	Nurse Fleur Healy	
2016	Hyde and Seek	Sonya Hyde	
2019–2020	Home and Away	Alex Neilson	Season 32–33 (recurring role)
2021	Doctor Doctor	Kassie	Season 5
2024	Time Bandits	Cassandra	Season 1, episode 1

=== Film ===
Year	Title	Role	Notes
2006	See No Evil	Eyeless Women	
2009	An Unfinished Romance	Flora	
2010	Stay Awake	Sarah	
2014	Drive Hard	Agent Walker	
2016	Science Fiction Volume One: The Osiris Child	Sgt. Cognit	
2017	You Can't Play the Game If You Don't Know the Rules	Andrea	
2017	Pirates of the Caribbean: Dead Men Tell No Tales	Mayor's wife	
2020	More Beautiful for Having Been Broken	McKenzie De Ridder	
