= George Houvardas =

Australian actor

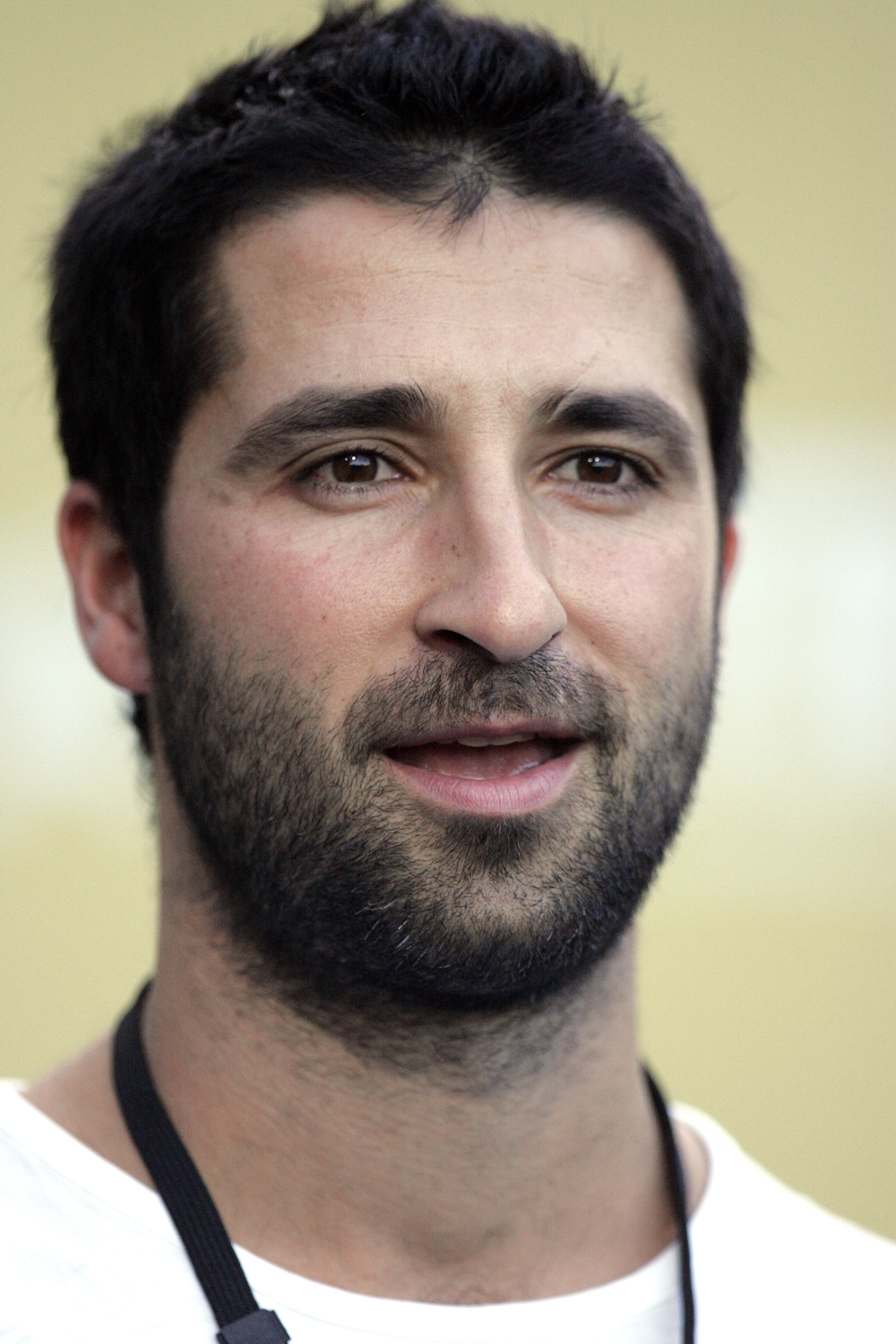
- Houvardas in February 2013
- Born: George Houvardas; Sydney, NSW, Australia
- Occupation: Actor
- Known for: Packed to the Rafters; Back to the Rafters

George Houvardas is an Australian actor who is best known for his role as Nick "Carbo" Karandonis in the television series Packed to the Rafters.

== Biography ==
Houvardas is the son of Anastasia (a teacher) and Michael (an accountant) and has two brothers, Steve and Tony (fat Tony) Houvardas.

Houvardas is a graduate of Screenwise drama school and works part-time, along with his brothers, at his family's restaurant in McMahons Point, Sydney.

Houvardas's school years saw many sporting achievements reached. From years 7 to 10, he was the school marathon champion. He also won Goalkeeper of the Year (in his first year as a goalkeeper) at school and played in the NSW State Championships.

== Career ==
From 2008 to 2013 he played Nick "Carbo" Karandonis in Packed to the Rafters. This was his first acting role after his first audition. In 2021 Houvardas was announced to return to the role of Nick 'Carbo' Karandonis for the Back to the Rafters 6 part series on Amazon Prime.

In 2009 Houvardas had a guest role in the second season of East West 101.

Houvardas appeared on Season 10 of the Seven Network reality show Dancing with the Stars in 2010.

== Filmography ==
Television

Year	Title	Role	Notes
2023	Wellmania	Stavros	1 episode
2019-21	Frayed (TV series)	Chris	12 episodes
2021	Back to the Rafters	Nick 'Carbo' Karandonis	6 episodes
2014	Shaun Micallef's Mad as Hell	Young Geoffrey Rush	1 episode
2008-13	Packed to the Rafters	Nick 'Carbo' Karandonis	121 episodes
2009	East West 101	Tony	3 episodes

Film

Year	Title	Role	Notes
2023	Transfusion	Tyler	
2018	Chasing Comets	The Rev	
2017	Outlaws	Dib	
2014	The JC Effect	Jay	Short

== Radio ==
In February 2011, Houvardas filled in on The Kyle & Jackie O Show alongside fellow Packed to the Rafters star Hugh Sheridan.

== Awards and nominations ==
Year	Category	Award	Series	Result
2010	Cleo Bachelor of the Year	-	-	nominated
2009	Most Popular New Male Talent	Logie Award	Packed to the Rafters	nominated
