= Logie Award for Most Outstanding Factual or Documentary Program =

Australian television award

- Country: Australia
- Presented by: TV Week
- First award: 1965
- Currently held by: The Australian Wars (2023)
- Website: www.tvweeklogieawards.com.au

The Silver Logie for Most Outstanding Factual or Documentary Program is an award presented annually at the Australian TV Week Logie Awards. The award is given to recognise an outstanding Australian factual, observational or documentary program. The winner and nominees of this award are chosen by television industry juries.

It was first awarded at the 7th Annual TV Week Logie Awards ceremony, held in 1965 as Best Documentary Series (1967, 1973-1974, 1976-1986). The award was renamed many times in subsequent ceremonies; Best Documentary (1966, 1969), Best Australian Documentary Series (1970), Best Documentary/Current Affairs Series (1971), Best Dramatised Documentary Series (1975). The nominees in the Best Documentary category were either single documentaries or documentary series. This award category was eliminated in 1968 and 1972.

At the 29th Annual TV Week Logie Awards in 1987, the industry voted awards for documentaries was renamed Most Outstanding Single Documentary or Documentary Series until 1993. It has also been known as Most Outstanding Documentary Single or Series (1994-1995), Most Outstanding Documentary (1996–1999, 2001, 2009), and Most Outstanding Documentary or Special Report in a Public Affairs Program (2000), Most Outstanding Documentary Series (2002-2006) and Most Outstanding Documentary or Documentary Series (2007-2008), Most Outstanding Factual Program (2010-2015). This award category was eliminated in 2016 and returned in 2017 as the Most Outstanding Factual or Documentary Program.

== Winners and nominees ==
| Key | Meaning |
|---|---|
| ‡ | Indicates the winning program |

Listed below are the winners of the award for each year for Best Documentary Series.

| Year | Program | Network | Ref |
|---|---|---|---|
| 1965 | Project 64‡ | Nine Network | |
| 1966 | Birth‡ | | |
| 1967 | Project 66‡ | Nine Network | |
| 1969 | The Talgai Skull‡ | ABC | |
| 1970 | Chequerboard‡ | ABC | |
| 1971 | Four Corners‡ | ABC | |
| 1973 | Shell's Australia‡ | Seven Network | |
| 1974 | Wild Australia‡ | ABC | |
| 1975 | Billy and Percy‡ | ABC | |
| 1976 | A Big Country‡ | ABC | |
| 1977 | Australians At War‡ | Network Ten | |
| 1978 | In the Wild‡ | ABC | |
| 1979 | A Big Country‡ | ABC | |
| 1980 | This Fabulous Century‡ | Seven Network | |
| 1981 | A Big Country‡ | ABC | |
| 1982 | A Matter of Chance‡ | ABC | |
| 1983 | John Laws' World‡ | Network Ten | |
| 1984 | Ash Wednesday‡ | | |
| 1985 | Frontline Afghanistan‡ | ABC | |
| 1986 | Sweat of the Sun, Tears of the Moon‡ | ABC | |

Listed below are the winners of the award for each year for Most Outstanding Factual or Documentary Series.

| Year | Program | Network | Ref |
|---|---|---|---|
| 1987 | Handle with Care‡(tied) | Network Ten | |
| 1987 | The Greatest Gift‡(tied) | Nine Network | |
| 1988 | Suzi's Story‡ | Network Ten | |
| 1989 | Nature of Australia‡ | ABC | |
| 1990 | Ladies in Line ‡ | ABC | |
| 1991 | The Chelmsford Scream‡ | Nine Network | |
| 1992 | The Time of Your Life‡ | ABC | |
| 1993 | Cop It Sweet‡ | ABC | |
| 1993 | Faces in the Mob‡(tied) | ABC | |
| 1994 | Labor in Power‡ | ABC | |
| 1995 | Fifty Years of Silence‡ | ABC | |
| 1996 | Untold Desires‡ | SBS | |
| 1997 | Somebody Now – Nobody's Children Seven Years On‡ | ABC | |
| 1998 | Rats in the Ranks‡ | ABC | |
| 1998 | The Big House | ABC | |
| 1998 | The Call of Kakadu | ABC | |
| 1998 | Mabo: Life of An Island Man | ABC | |
| 1998 | Tell My Kids I'm Sorry | Seven Network | |
| 1999 | Miracle at Sea: The Rescue of Tony Bullimore‡ | ABC | |
| 1999 | Afrika: Cape Town to Cairo | ABC | |
| 1999 | Exile In Sarajevo | SBS | |
| 1999 | Mabo: Rite of Passage | SBS | |
| 2000 | Facing the Demons‡ | ABC | |
| 2000 | A Race to Survive | ABC | |
| 2000 | Sierra Leone | SBS | |
| 2000 | The Keating Millions | Nine Network | |
| 2001 | A Death in the Family‡ | SBS | |
| 2001 | The Diplomat | SBS | |
| 2001 | The Last Warriors | Seven Network | |
| 2001 | The Track | ABC | |
| 2002 | Australians at War‡ | ABC | |
| 2002 | 100 Years | ABC | |
| 2002 | Drama School | Seven Network | |
| 2002 | Journeys to the Ends of the Earth | ABC | |
| 2002 | Long Way to the Top | ABC | |
| 2002 | The Ties That Bind | ABC | |
| 2003 | Australian Story‡ | ABC | |
| 2003 | Black Chicks Talking | ABC | |
| 2003 | Gough Whitlam: In His Own Words | SBS | |
| 2003 | Gulpilil: One Red Blood | ABC | |
| 2003 | Rainbow Bird and Monster Man | SBS | |
| 2004 | Dying to Leave‡ | SBS | |
| 2004 | Beyond Bronte | Nine Network | |
| 2004 | From Korea with Love | SBS | |
| 2004 | Love is in the Air | ABC | |
| 2004 | Man Made: The Story of Two Men and a Baby | SBS | |
| 2005 | The President vs David Hicks‡ | SBS | |
| 2005 | The Last Voices From Heaven Parts 1 & 2 | Foxtel | |
| 2005 | Moulin Rouge Girls | ABC | |
| 2005 | Stories From a Children's Hospital: Chloe's Story | ABC | |
| 2005 | Tug of Love | SBS | |
| 2006 | He's Coming South: The Attack on Sydney Harbour‡ | The History Channel | |
| 2006 | The Colony | SBS | |
| 2006 | Divorce Stories | SBS | |
| 2006 | Frank Hurley: The Man Who Made History | ABC | |
| 2006 | Revealing Gallipoli | ABC | |
| 2007 | Who Killed Dr Bogle and Mrs Chandler?‡ | ABC | |
| 2007 | The Battle of Long Tan | The History Channel | |
| 2007 | The Bridge at Midnight Trembles | SBS | |
| 2007 | The Floating Brothel | ABC | |
| 2007 | Life at 1 | ABC | |
| 2008 | Constructing Australia: The Bridge‡ | ABC | |
| 2008 | Captain Cook: Obsession and Discovery | ABC | |
| 2008 | Inside Australia: My Brother Vinnie | SBS | |
| 2008 | The Sounds of Aus | ABC | |
| 2008 | The Ultimate Donation | Network Ten | |
| 2009 | First Australians‡ | SBS | |
| 2009 | Beyond Kokoda | The History Channel | |
| 2009 | The Oasis: Australia's Homeless Youth | ABC | |
| 2009 | Schapelle Corby: The Hidden Truth | Nine Network | |
| 2009 | The Howard Years | ABC | |
| 2010 | Law and Disorder‡ | SBS | |
| 2010 | Bombora: The Story of Australian Surfing | ABC | |
| 2010 | Bondi Rescue | Network Ten | |
| 2010 | Darwin's Brave New World | ABC | |
| 2010 | Last Chance Saloon | SBS | |
| 2011 | Trishna & Krishna: The Quest For Separate Lives‡ | Seven Network | |
| 2011 | Bondi Rescue | Network Ten | |
| 2011 | Miracle in the Storm | ABC | |
| 2011 | RPA | Nine Network | |
| 2011 | Such is Life: The Troubled Times of Ben Cousins | Seven Network | |
| 2012 | Go Back To Where You Came From‡ | SBS | |
| 2012 | Leaky Boat | ABC | |
| 2012 | Mrs Carey's Concert | ABC | |
| 2012 | Outback Fight Club | SBS | |
| 2012 | Tony Robinson Explores Australia | The History Channel | |
| 2013 | Bondi Rescue‡ | Network Ten | |
| 2013 | Bondi Vet | Network Ten | |
| 2013 | Border Security: Australia's Front Line | Seven Network | |
| 2013 | RPA | Nine Network | |
| 2013 | Who Do You Think You Are? | SBS | |
| 2014 | Kings Cross ER: St Vincent's Hospital‡ | Crime & Investigation Network | |
| 2014 | Desert War | ABC | |
| 2014 | Dirty Business | SBS | |
| 2014 | Jabbed | SBS | |
| 2014 | Redesign My Brain | ABC | |
| 2015 | First Contact‡ | SBS | |
| 2015 | Brilliant Creatures | ABC | |
| 2015 | Changing Minds | ABC | |
| 2015 | Coast Australia | The History Channel | |
| 2015 | The War That Changed Us | ABC | |
| 2017 | Conviction‡ | ABC | |
| 2017 | Deep Water: The Real Story | SBS | |
| 2017 | Gogglebox Australia | Lifestyle Channel / Network Ten | |
| 2017 | Keeping Australia Alive | ABC | |
| 2017 | Todd Sampson's Body Hack | Network Ten | |
| 2018 | War on Waste‡ | ABC | |
| 2018 | Michael Hutchence: The Last Rockstar | Seven Network | |
| 2018 | Struggle Street | SBS | |
| 2018 | The Queen & Zak Grieve | Crime & Investigation | |
| 2018 | You Can't Ask That | ABC | |
| 2019 | Ron Iddles: The Good Cop‡ | Foxtel | |
| 2019 | Employable Me | ABC | |
| 2019 | Exposed: The Case Of Keli Lane | ABC | |
| 2019 | Taboo | Network Ten | |
| 2019 | The Pacific – In The Wake Of Captain Cook With Sam Neill | Foxtel | |
| 2022 | Incarceration Nation‡ | NITV | |
| 2022 | Burning | Amazon Prime Video | |
| 2022 | Firestarter – The Story of Bangarra | ABC | |
| 2022 | See What You Made Me Do | SBS | |
| 2022 | The School That Tried To End Racism | ABC | |
| 2023 | The Australian Wars | SBS | |
| 2023 | Alone Australia | SBS | |
| 2023 | Australia’s Wild Odyssey | ABC | |
| 2023 | Old People’s Home For Teenagers | ABC | |
| 2023 | Revealed: Trafficked | Stan | |
| 2023 | Todd Sampson’s Mirror Mirror: Love & Hate | Network Ten | |

== See also ==
- Logie Award for Most Popular Factual Program
