= Logie Award for Most Popular Factual Program =

- Country: Australia
- Presented by: TV Week
- First award: 2008
- Currently held by: Gogglebox Australia (2017)

Highlights
- Most awards: Bondi Rescue (6)
- Website: tvweeklogieawards.com.au

The Logie for Most Popular Factual Program was an award presented annually at the Australian TV Week Logie Awards. It was given to recognise the popularity of an Australian factual program.

The award was first awarded at the 50th Annual TV Week Logie Awards ceremony, held in 2008 when it was originally called Most Popular Factual Program. The award was discontinued after the 55th Annual TV Week Logie Awards in 2013, however the category was reinstated in 2016 at the 58th Annual TV Week Logie Awards. For the 2016 and 2017 ceremonies, it was renamed Best Factual Program before being permanently eliminated in 2018.

The winner and nominees of Most Popular Factual Program are chosen by the public through an online voting survey on the TV Week website. Bondi Rescue holds the record for the most wins, winning the category every year in the first six years it was awarded.

== Winners and nominees ==
Listed below are the winners of the award for each year, as well as the other nominees.

Key	Meaning
‡	Indicates the winning program

Year	Program	Network	Ref
2008	Bondi Rescue‡	Network Ten	
2008	Border Security: Australia's Front Line	Seven Network	
2008	The Choir of Hard Knocks	ABC1	
2008	RPA	Nine Network	
2008	RSPCA Animal Rescue	Seven Network	
2009	Bondi Rescue‡	Network Ten	
2009	Border Security: Australia's Front Line	Seven Network	
2009	Find My Family	Seven Network	
2009	RPA	Nine Network	
2009	RSPCA Animal Rescue	Seven Network	
2010	Bondi Rescue‡	Network Ten	
2010	Border Security: Australia's Front Line	Seven Network	
2010	Find My Family	Seven Network	
2010	RPA	Nine Network	
2010	RSPCA Animal Rescue	Seven Network	
2011	Bondi Rescue‡	Network Ten	
2011	Bondi Vet	Network Ten	
2011	Undercover Boss Australia	Network Ten	
2011	RPA	Nine Network	
2011	Who Do You Think You Are?	SBS1	
2012	Bondi Rescue‡	Network Ten	
2012	Bondi Vet	Network Ten	
2012	Border Security: Australia's Front Line	Seven Network	
2012	RPA	Nine Network	
2012	The World's Strictest Parents	Seven Network	
2013	Bondi Rescue‡	Network Ten	
2013	Bondi Vet	Network Ten	
2013	Border Security: Australia's Front Line	Seven Network	
2013	RPA	Nine Network	
2013	Who Do You Think You Are?	SBS	
2016	Gogglebox Australia‡	The Lifestyle Channel	
2016	Gogglebox Australia‡	Network Ten	
2016	Australian Story	ABC	
2016	Bondi Rescue	Network Ten	
2016	Bondi Vet	Network Ten	
2016	Who Do You Think You Are?	SBS	
2017	Gogglebox Australia‡	The Lifestyle Channel	
2017	Gogglebox Australia‡	Network Ten	
2017	Australian Story	ABC	
2017	Bondi Rescue	Network Ten	
2017	Bondi Vet	Network Ten	
2017	Todd Sampson's Body Hack	Network Ten	

== Multiple wins/nominations ==
Number	Program
Wins
6	Bondi Rescue
2	Gogglebox Australia
Nominations
8	Bondi Rescue
6	RPA
5	Border Security: Australia's Front Line
5	Bondi Vet
3	RSPCA Animal Rescue
3	Who Do You Think You Are?
2	Australian Story
2	Find My Family
2	Gogglebox Australia
