= The Pet Rescuers =

Australian observational documentary series

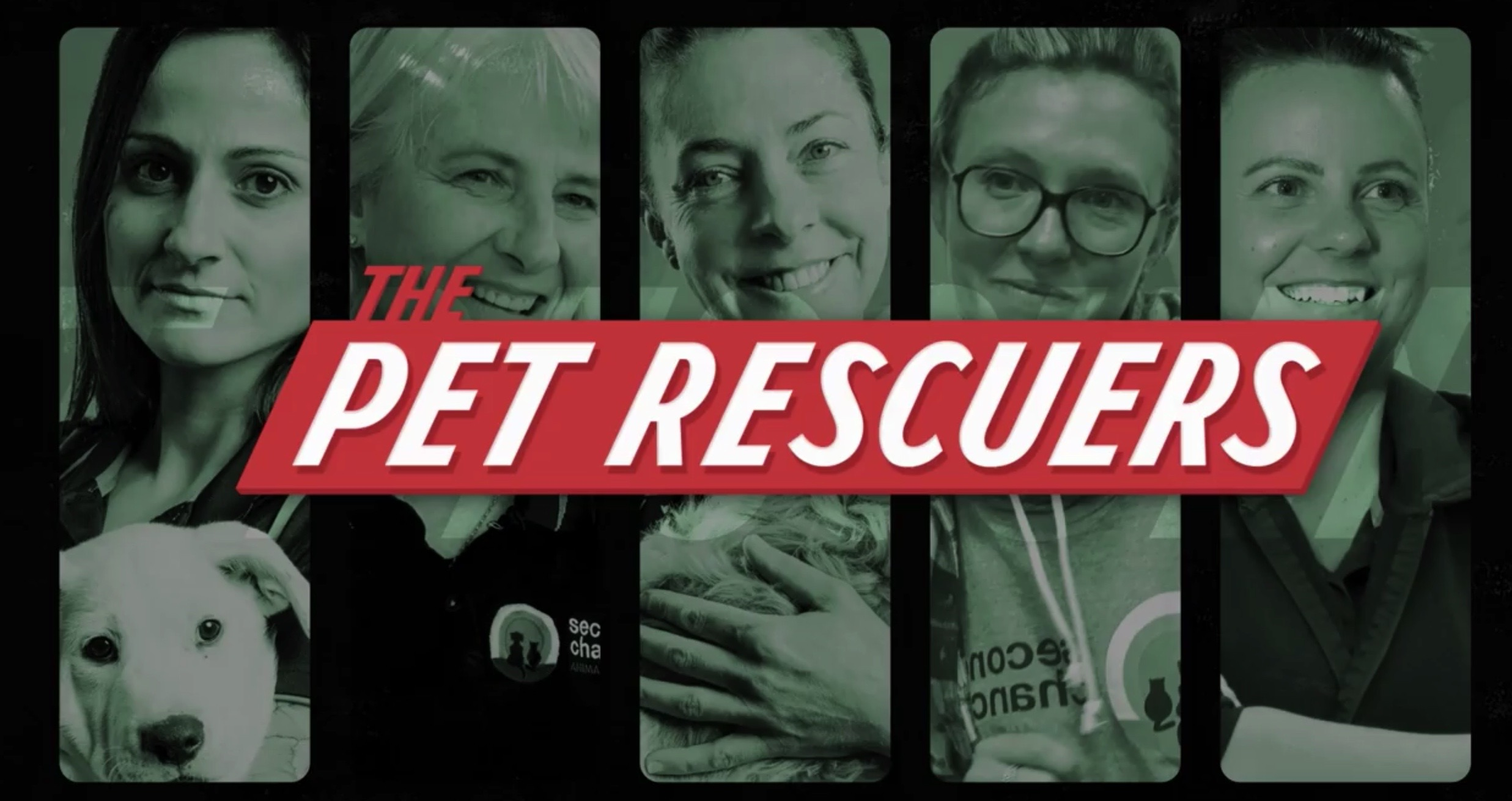

The Pet Rescuers is an Australian observational documentary series first screened on the Nine Network in 2021. It follows the work of a team on a mission to give abandoned pets a second chance. The 10 part series was created by Gillian Bartlett and produced by Gillian Bartlett and Euan Jones for Silverfox Network.

After a successful first series, Nine Network commissioned 20 episodes for the second season, which was delivered in July 2022 and scheduled for broadcast on 18 February 2023. As well as featuring daily life at Second Chance Animal Rescue in Melbourne, the second season also features dog trainer Laura V and Wildlife Xposure front man Xavier Morello.

== See also ==
- Pet Rescue
- RSPCA Animal Rescue
- The Dog House
- Bondi Vet
