= Logie Awards of 2018 =

Australian television awards ceremony

60th Logie Awards
- Date: 1 July 2018
- Site: The Star Gold Coast, Queensland

Highlights
- Gold Logie: Grant Denyer
- Hall of Fame: 60 Minutes
- Most awards: Wentworth (3)
- Most nominations: Doctor Doctor, Wentworth and Safe Harbour (5)

Television coverage
- Network: Nine Network (HD)

The 60th annual TV Week Logie Awards ceremony was held at The Star Gold Coast in Queensland, and broadcast live on the Nine Network. Public voting for the Most Popular Award categories ran from 5 March to 1 April 2018, with the shortlist of nominees revealed on 27 May. Voting reopened for the Popular Award categories on 29 June and remained open until the start of the ceremony, with each person given one extra vote in each category.

The red carpet arrivals was hosted by Karl Stefanovic and Georgie Gardner.

Each network is restricted in the number of personalities and programs they can submit for consideration in the publicly voted category, including up to 10 names in both the Most Popular Actor and Actress categories, 15 names for Most Popular Presenter and 5 programs for Most Popular Drama. These restrictions often lead to controversy over those who are not listed in the voting form, and as a result, they are not eligible to be nominated for an award.

== Nominees ==
Nominees were announced on 27 May 2018.

=== Gold Logie ===
Most Popular Personality on Australian Television
- Grant Denyer in All Star Family Feud (Network Ten) and Family Feud (Network Ten)
  - Amanda Keller in The Living Room (Network Ten)
  - Andrew Winter in Selling Houses Australia (Foxtel – Lifestyle) and Love It or List It Australia (Foxtel – Lifestyle)
  - Jessica Marais in Love Child (Nine Network) and The Wrong Girl (Network Ten)
  - Rodger Corser in Doctor Doctor (Nine Network)
  - Tracy Grimshaw in A Current Affair (Nine Network)

=== Acting/Presenting ===
Most Popular Actor	Most Popular Actress
Ray Meagher in Home and Away (Seven Network); Aaron Jeffery in Underbelly Files: Chopper (Nine Network); Erik Thomson in 800 Words (Seven Network); Luke McGregor in Rosehaven (ABC); Rodger Corser in Doctor Doctor (Nine Network)	Jessica Marais in Love Child (Nine Network) and The Wrong Girl (Network Ten); Asher Keddie in Offspring (Network Ten); Celia Pacquola in Rosehaven (ABC) and Utopia (ABC); Deborah Mailman in Cleverman (ABC); Julia Morris in House Husbands (Nine Network)
Most Outstanding Actor	Most Outstanding Actress
Hugo Weaving in Seven Types of Ambiguity (ABC); Damon Herriman in Riot (ABC); Ewen Leslie in Safe Harbour (SBS); Lachy Hulme in Romper Stomper (Stan); Rodger Corser in Doctor Doctor (Nine Network)	Pamela Rabe in Wentworth (Foxtel – Showcase); Elisabeth Moss in Top of the Lake: China Girl (Foxtel – BBC First); Kate Atkinson in Wentworth (Foxtel – Showcase); Kate Box in Riot (ABC); Leeanna Walsman in Safe Harbour (SBS)
Most Outstanding Supporting Actor	Most Outstanding Supporting Actress
Hazem Shammas in Safe Harbour (SBS); Aaron Pedersen in A Place To Call Home (Foxtel – Showcase); Alex Dimitriades in Wake in Fright (Network Ten); Anthony Hayes in Seven Types of Ambiguity (ABC); David Wenham in Romper Stomper (Stan)	Jacqueline McKenzie in Romper Stomper (Stan); Celia Ireland in Wenworth (Foxtel – Showcase); Elsa Cocquerel in Wolf Creek (Stan); Jenni Baird in A Place to Call Home (Foxtel – Showcase); Nicole Chamoun in Safe Harbour (SBS)
Graham Kennedy Award for Most Popular New Talent	Most Popular Presenter
Dilruk Jayasinha in CRAM! (Network Ten) and Utopia (ABC); Matty Johnson in The Living Room (Network Ten); Sam Frost in Home and Away (Seven Network); Sophia Forrest in Love Child (Nine Network); Sophie Dillman in Home and Away (Seven Network)	Grant Denyer in All Star Family Feud (Network Ten) and Family Feud (Network Ten); Amanda Keller in The Living Room (Network Ten); Andrew Winter in Selling Houses Australia (Foxtel – Lifestyle) and Love It or List It Australia (Foxtel – Lifestyle); Carrie Bickmore in The Project (Network Ten); Tracy Grimshaw in A Current Affair (Nine Network)

=== Most Popular Programs ===
Most Popular Drama Program	Most Popular Entertainment Program
Wentworth (Foxtel – Showcase); Doctor Doctor (Nine Network); Home and Away (Seven Network); Love Child (Nine Network); Offspring (Network Ten)	Gogglebox Australia (Foxtel/Network Ten); Anh's Brush with Fame (ABC); Family Feud (Network Ten); Hard Quiz (ABC); The Project (Network Ten)
Most Popular Reality Program	Most Popular Lifestyle Program
The Block (Nine Network); I'm a Celebrity...Get Me Out of Here! (Network Ten); Married at First Sight (Nine Network); My Kitchen Rules (Seven Network); Travel Guides (Nine Network)	The Living Room (Network Ten); Better Homes and Gardens (Seven Network); Gardening Australia (ABC); Selling Houses Australia (Foxtel – Lifestyle); The Checkout (ABC)
Most Popular Comedy Program
Have You Been Paying Attention? (Network Ten); Here Come the Habibs (Nine Network); Hughesy, We Have a Problem (Network Ten); Shaun Micallef's Mad as Hell (ABC); True Story with Hamish & Andy (Nine Network)

=== Most Outstanding Programs ===
Most Outstanding Drama Series	Most Outstanding Miniseries or Telemovie
Wentworth (Foxtel – Showcase); A Place to Call Home (Foxtel – Showcase); Doctor Doctor (Nine Network); Harrow (ABC); Top of the Lake: China Girl (Foxtel – BBC First)	Romper Stomper (Stan); Safe Harbour (SBS); Seven Types of Ambiguity (ABC); Underbelly Files: Chopper (Nine Network); Wake in Fright (Network Ten)
Most Outstanding Sports Coverage	Most Outstanding Factual or Documentary Program
2017 Bathurst 1000 (Network Ten); 2017 AFL Grand Final (Seven Network); 2017 Australian Open Men's Final (Seven Network); Jeff Horn vs Manny Pacquiao (Foxtel – Main Event); The 2017/2018 Ashes (Nine Network)	War on Waste (ABC); Michael Hutchence: The Last Rockstar (Seven Network); Struggle Street (SBS); The Queen & Zak Grieve (Foxtel – Crime & Investigation); You Can't Ask That (ABC)
Most Outstanding Children's Program	Most Outstanding News Coverage or Public Affairs Report
Little J & Big Cuz (NITV); Crash The Bash (Foxtel – Nickelodeon); Get Arty (Seven Network); Grace Beside Me (NITV); Mustangs FC (ABC ME)	"The Siege" (Four Corners, ABC); "Don Burke Special" (A Current Affair, Nine Network); "Escape From Salt Creek" (60 Minutes, Nine Network); "Haiti Uncovered" (Sunday Night, Seven Network); "Pumped" (Four Corners, ABC)

== Changes ==
As well as the introduction of "live voting" for 10 categories, the total number of categories were reduced from 27 at last year's ceremony to 20. 10 of the categories were voted for by the public, while the remaining 10 Outstanding Awards were industry voted. Publicly voted awards also reverted to being named "Most Popular" rather than "Best," which was introduced at the 2016 ceremony.

With the ceremony being held later in the year than previous events to avoid clashing with the 2018 Commonwealth Games also being held on the Gold Coast, the nomination eligibility was extended, meaning shows airing before 31 March 2018 could qualify for nomination. This marked the first Logie Awards to be held on the Gold Coast, after the Government of Victoria stopped providing funding for the event.

== Presenters ==
- Dave Hughes

== Performers ==
- Kelly Rowland with Sam Perry
- Jess Glynne
- Conrad Sewell
- Kate Ceberano
