= Logie Awards of 2017 =

Australian television awards ceremony

59th Logie Awards
- Date: 23 April 2017
- Site: Crown Palladium, Melbourne, Victoria

Highlights
- Gold Logie: Samuel Johnson
- Hall of Fame: Kerri-Anne Kennerley
- Most awards: Molly (3)
- Most nominations: Doctor Doctor (6)

Television coverage
- Network: Nine Network (HD)

The 59th Annual TV Week Logie Awards were held on Sunday 23 April 2017 at the Crown Palladium in Melbourne, and broadcast live on the Nine Network. Public voting for the Best Award categories began on 20 November 2016 and ended on 18 December 2016.

Following the return of the Logie Award for Best Factual Program category at the 2016 Logie Awards, the 2017 Awards reinstated the category of Logie Award for Most Outstanding Factual or Documentary Program, which is not a publicly voted category.

Dannii Minogue was named as 2017 Logies ambassador.

== Nominees & Winners ==
Nominees were announced on 26 March 2017.

=== Gold Logie ===
Best Personality on Australian Television
- Samuel Johnson in Molly (Seven Network)
  - Waleed Aly in The Project (Network Ten)
  - Rodger Corser in Doctor Doctor (Nine Network) and The Doctor Blake Mysteries (ABC)
  - Grant Denyer in All Star Family Feud (Network Ten), Family Feud (Network Ten) and The Great Australian Spelling Bee (Network Ten)
  - Peter Helliar in The Project (Network Ten)
  - Jessica Marais in Love Child (Nine Network) and The Wrong Girl (Network Ten)

=== Acting/Presenting ===
Best Actor	Best Actress
Samuel Johnson in Molly (Seven Network); Rodger Corser in Doctor Doctor (Nine Network) and The Doctor Blake Mysteries (ABC); Craig McLachlan in Deep Water (SBS), The Doctor Blake Mysteries (ABC) and The Wrong Girl (Network Ten); Richard Roxburgh in Rake (ABC); Erik Thomson in 800 Words (Seven Network)	Jessica Marais in Love Child (Nine Network) and The Wrong Girl (Network Ten); Marta Dusseldorp in A Place to Call Home (Showcase), Jack Irish (ABC) and Janet King (ABC); Asher Keddie in Offspring (Network Ten); Deborah Mailman in Cleverman (ABC), Jack Irish (ABC), Offspring (Network Ten) and Wolf Creek (Stan); Jessica Mauboy in The Secret Daughter (Seven Network)
Most Outstanding Actor	Most Outstanding Actress
Henry Nixon in The Kettering Incident (Showcase); Rodger Corser in Doctor Doctor (Nine Network); Samuel Johnson in Molly (Seven Network); Richard Roxburgh in Rake (ABC); Noah Taylor in Deep Water (SBS)	Anna Torv in Secret City (Showcase); Danielle Cormack in Wentworth (Showcase); Elizabeth Debicki in The Kettering Incident (Showcase); Marta Dusseldorp in Janet King (ABC); Jessica Marais in Love Child (Nine Network); Yael Stone in Deep Water (SBS)
Most Outstanding Supporting Actor	Most Outstanding Supporting Actress
Damon Herriman in Secret City (Showcase); Rick Donald in 800 Words (Seven Network); Ryan Johnson in Doctor Doctor (Nine Network); Ben Oxenbould in Deep Water (SBS); Matt Nable in Barracuda (ABC)	Debra Lawrance in Please Like Me (ABC); Jenni Baird in A Place to Call Home (Showcase); Nicole da Silva in Wentworth (Showcase); Victoria Haralabidou in Barracuda (ABC); Deborah Mailman in Wolf Creek (Stan)
Best New Talent	Best Presenter
Rob Collins in Cleverman (ABC) and The Wrong Girl (Network Ten); Shalom Brune-Franklin in Doctor Doctor (Nine Network); Tiarnie Coupland in Love Child (Nine Network); Hayley Magnus in The Wrong Girl (Network Ten); Penny McNamee in Home and Away (Seven Network)	Waleed Aly in The Project (Network Ten); Carrie Bickmore in The Project (Network Ten); Grant Denyer in All Star Family Feud (Network Ten), Family Feud (Network Ten) and The Great Australian Spelling Bee (Network Ten); Sarah Harris in Studio 10 (Network Ten) and Shark Tank (Network Ten); Amanda Keller in The Living Room (Network Ten)
Graham Kennedy Award For Most Outstanding Newcomer
Elias Anton in Barracuda (ABC); Tilda Cobham-Hervey in The Kettering Incident (Showcase); Rob Collins in Cleverman (ABC); Geraldine Hakewill in Wanted (Seven Network); Hunter Page-Lochard in Cleverman (ABC)

=== Best Programs ===
Best Drama Program	Best Entertainment Program
Molly (Seven Network); 800 Words (Seven Network); Doctor Doctor (Nine Network); Home and Away (Seven Network); Offspring (Network Ten); Wentworth (Showcase)	Have You Been Paying Attention? (Network Ten); Anh's Brush with Fame (ABC); Family Feud (Network Ten); The Voice (Nine Network); Upper Middle Bogan (ABC)
Best Reality Program	Best Sports Program
The Block (Nine Network); Australian Survivor (Network Ten); I'm a Celebrity...Get Me Out of Here! (Network Ten); MasterChef Australia (Network Ten); My Kitchen Rules (Seven Network)	The NRL Footy Show (Nine Network); In Rio Today (Seven Network); Monday Night with Matty Johns (Fox Sports); The AFL Footy Show (Nine Network); Wide World of Sports (Nine Network)
Best Lifestyle Program	Best Factual Program
The Living Room (Network Ten); Better Homes and Gardens (Seven Network); Gardening Australia (ABC); Luke Warm Sex (ABC); Selling Houses Australia (Lifestyle)	Gogglebox Australia (Lifestyle/Network Ten); Australian Story (ABC); Bondi Rescue (Network Ten); Bondi Vet (Network Ten); Todd Sampson's Body Hack (Network Ten)
Best News Panel or a Current Affairs Program
The Project (Network Ten); Four Corners (ABC); Studio 10 (Network Ten); Sunrise (Seven Network); Today (Nine Network)

=== Most Outstanding Programs ===
Most Outstanding Drama Series	Most Outstanding Miniseries or Telemovie
A Place to Call Home (Showcase); Cleverman (ABC); Rake (ABC); The Code (ABC); Wentworth (Showcase)	The Kettering Incident (Showcase); Barracuda (ABC); Deep Water (SBS); Molly (Seven Network); Secret City (Showcase)
Most Outstanding Entertainment Program	Most Outstanding Comedy Program
Have You Been Paying Attention? (Network Ten); Anh's Brush with Fame (ABC); Gruen (ABC); The Voice (Nine Network); The Weekly with Charlie Pickering (ABC)	Please Like Me (ABC); Black Comedy (ABC); Rosehaven (ABC); Shaun Micallef's Mad as Hell (ABC); Upper Middle Bogan (ABC)
Most Outstanding Children's Program	Most Outstanding Public Affairs Report
Little Lunch: The Nightmare Before Graduation (ABC ME); Beat Bugs (Seven Network); Bottersnikes & Gumbles (Seven Network); Nowhere Boys: Two Moons Rising (ABC ME); Tomorrow When the War Began (ABC ME)	"Australia's Shame" (Four Corners, ABC); "Anita Cobby: You Thought You Knew It All…" (Seven News Investigates, Seven Network); "George Pell Investigation" (7.30, ABC); "Good Cop, Bad Cop" (60 Minutes, Nine Network); "Money For Nothing" (Four Corners, ABC)
Most Outstanding News Coverage	Most Outstanding Sports Coverage
"Sky News Election Coverage 2016" (Sky News Live); "Bankstown Hospital" (Nine News, Nine Network); "Federal Election 2016" (Seven News, Seven Network); "Inside Syria" (SBS World News, SBS); "S.A. Waste Dump" (NITV News, NITV)	Rio 2016 Olympic Games (Seven Network); 2016 NRL Grand Final (Nine Network); 2016 Supercars Supercheap Auto Bathurst 1000 (Network Ten); 2016 AFL Grand Final (Seven Network); KFC Big Bash League (Network Ten)
Most Outstanding Factual or Documentary Program
Conviction (ABC); Deep Water: The Real Story (SBS); Gogglebox Australia (Lifestyle/Network Ten); Keeping Australia Alive (ABC); Todd Sampson's Body Hack (Network Ten)

== Network Nominations ==
Network	No. of Nominations	No. of Wins
Network Ten	31	8
ABC	40	7
Foxtel	19	7
Seven Network	22	4
Nine Network	20	3
SBS	7	0
Stan	2	0
NITV	1	0

== Presenters ==
- Dave Hughes
- Hamish & Andy
- Rachel Griffiths
- Alex Dimitriades
- Carrie Bickmore
- Dannii Minogue
- Delta Goodrem
- Tina Arena
- Erik Thomson
- Rebecca Maddern
- Claudia Karvan
- Daniel Wyllie
- Shaun Micallef
- Mandy McElhinney
- Ita Buttrose
- Miranda Tapsell
- Liz Hayes
- Amanda Keller
- Peter Helliar
- Larry Emdur
- Shane Jacobson
- Ben Mingay
- Pamela Rabe
- Leigh Sales
- Todd Sampson
- Sam Pang with Lorrae Desmond
- Ben Fordham

== Performers ==
- Andy Grammer
- Casey Donovan
- James Blunt
- Jessica Mauboy

== In Memoriam ==
Ross Higgins actor, Kingswood Country
