= Logie Award for Most Popular Panel or Current Affairs Program =

Australian television award

- Country: Australia
- Presented by: TV Week
- First award: 1980
- Currently held by: Australian Story (2025)

Highlights
- Most awards: A Current Affair (11)
- Website: tvweeklogieawards.com.au

The Logie Award for Most Popular Panel or Current Affairs Program is an award which is presented at the Australian TV Week Logie Awards. It is given to recognise the popularity of an Australian news panel discussion or current affairs television show.

The award was first presented at the 22nd Annual TV Week Logie Awards held in 1980 as the Logie for Most Popular Public Affairs Program. It was eliminated as a category in 1999 but reintroduced in 2000, until it was eliminated again in 2013. For the 58th Annual TV Week Logie Awards ceremony held in 2016, the category was reintroduced as the Logie Award for Best News Panel or a Current Affairs Program and it was also awarded in 2017 before being eliminated in 2018. It returned in 2019 as the Logie Award for Most Popular Panel or Current Affairs Program. It changed to Most Popular Current Affairs Program in 2023.

== Winners and nominees ==
Key	Meaning
‡	Indicates the winning program

Listed below are the winners of the award for each year, as well as the other nominees as Most Popular Public Affairs Program.

Year	Program	Network	Ref
1980	60 Minutes‡	Nine Network	
1981	60 Minutes‡	Nine Network	
1982	60 Minutes‡	Nine Network	
1983	60 Minutes‡	Nine Network	
1984	60 Minutes‡	Nine Network	
1985	60 Minutes‡	Nine Network	
1986	60 Minutes‡	Nine Network	
1987	60 Minutes‡	Nine Network	
1988	60 Minutes‡	Nine Network	
1989	A Current Affair‡	Nine Network	
1990	A Current Affair‡	Nine Network	
1991	A Current Affair‡	Nine Network	
1992	A Current Affair‡	Nine Network	
1993	A Current Affair‡	Nine Network	
1994	Real Life‡	Seven Network	
1995	A Current Affair‡	Nine Network	
1996	A Current Affair‡	Nine Network	
1997	A Current Affair‡	Nine Network	
1998	A Current Affair‡	Nine Network	
2000	A Current Affair‡	Nine Network	
2000	60 Minutes	Nine Network	
2000	The 7.30 Report	ABC TV	
2000	Today Tonight	Seven Network	
2001	A Current Affair‡	Seven Network	
2001	60 Minutes	Nine Network	
2001	Today	Nine Network	
2001	Today Tonight	Seven Network	
2002	Today Tonight ‡	Seven Network	
2002	A Current Affair	Nine Network	
2002	Australian Story	ABC TV	
2002	60 Minutes	Nine Network	
2002	Today	Nine Network	

Listed below are the winners of the award for each year, as well as the other nominees for the Logie for Best News Panel or a Current Affairs Program.

Year	Program	Network	Reference
2016	The Project‡	Network Ten	
2016	60 Minutes	Nine Network	
2016	Q&A	ABC	
2016	Sunrise	Seven Network	
2016	Today	Nine Network	
2017	The Project‡	Network Ten	
2017	Four Corners	ABC	
2017	60 Minutes	Nine Network	
2017	Sunrise	Seven Network	
2017	Today	Nine Network	
2019	The Project‡	Network Ten	
2019	7.30	ABC	
2019	60 Minutes	Nine Network	
2019	A Current Affair	Nine Network	
2019	Australian Story	ABC	
2019	Four Corners	ABC	
2022	The Project‡	Network Ten	
2022	7.30	ABC	
2022	Australian Story	ABC	
2022	A Current Affair	Nine Network	
2022	Four Corners	ABC	
2022	The Front Bar	Seven Network	

Listed below are the winners of the award for each year, as well as the other nominees for the Logie for Most Popular Current Affairs Program.

Year	Program	Network	Reference
2023	Australian Story	ABC	
2023	60 Minutes	Nine Network	
2023	7.30	ABC	
2023	A Current Affair	Nine Network	
2023	Foreign Correspondent	ABC	
2023	Four Corners	ABC	
2024	Australian Story	ABC	
2024	60 Minutes	Nine Network	
2024	7.30	ABC	
2024	A Current Affair	Nine Network	
2024	Foreign Correspondent	ABC	
2024	Four Corners	ABC	
2025	Australian Story	ABC	
2025	60 Minutes	Nine Network	
2025	7.30	ABC	
2025	A Current Affair	Nine Network	
2025	Four Corners	ABC	
2025	Seven News Spotlight	Seven Network	
