= Logie Awards of 2010 =

Australian TV awards

52nd Logie Awards
- Date: 2 May 2010
- Site: Crown Palladium, Melbourne, Victoria
- Hosted by: Bert Newton

Highlights
- Gold Logie: Ray Meagher
- Hall of Fame: Brian Naylor (posthumously)
- Most awards: Packed to the Rafters and Talkin' 'Bout Your Generation (3)
- Most nominations: Home and Away (11)

The 52nd TV Week Logie Awards ceremony was held on Sunday 2 May 2010 at the Crown Palladium in Melbourne, and broadcast on the Nine Network. The ceremony was hosted by Bert Newton, making it the 19th time he hosted the event as a solo host. The red carpet arrivals were hosted by Karl Stefanovic, Lisa Wilkinson, Jules Lund and Ruby Rose, while Richard Wilkins and Natalie Gruzlewski presented the Myer Logie Minute during the ceremony. The Big Bang Theory's Johnny Galecki was one of the international guests. Musical performers at the event were John Mayer, Gabriella Cilmi with the cast from the stage musical Fame, k.d. lang and the Rogue Traders. John Foreman returned as musical director for the event. Susan Boyle was scheduled to perform but pulled out a few weeks before the ceremony, cancelling all her appearances in Australia. PJ Lane sang a tribute to his late father Don Lane. Early that year, Each network is restricted in the number of personalities and programs they can submit for consideration in the publicly voted category, including up to 10 names in both the Most Popular Actor and Actress categories, 15 names for Most Popular Presenter and 5 programs for Most Popular Drama. These restrictions often lead to controversy over those who are not listed in the voting form, and are not eligible to be nominated for an award.

== Nominations ==
The traditional Logies nominations breakfast was held on 29 March 2010 at the Ivy Pool Bar in Sydney. The breakfast was hosted by Charlie Pickering and Gigi Edgley. Both Sunrise, The Morning Show and Today crossed to the event live. The Seven Network had 34 nominations, the most of any network out of the 113 in total. ABC3 got its first nomination since its launch months earlier than the ceremony, and is the first of any of the digital channels (ABC2, 7Two, GO!, SBS Two and ONE HD) to receive a nomination.

== Winners and nominees ==
In the tables below, winners are listed first and highlighted in bold.

=== Gold Logie ===
Most Popular Personality on Australian Television
- **Ray Meagher in Home and Away (Seven Network)**
  - Esther Anderson in Home and Away (Seven Network)
  - Wil Anderson in The Gruen Transfer (ABC1)
  - Rebecca Gibney in Packed to the Rafters (Seven Network)
  - Adam Hills in Spicks and Specks (ABC1)
  - Paul McDermott in Good News Week (Network Ten)
  - Rove McManus in Rove and Are You Smarter Than a 5th Grader? (Network Ten)
  - Shaun Micallef in Talkin' 'Bout Your Generation (Network Ten)

=== Acting/Presenting ===
Most Popular Actor	Most Popular Actress
**Hugh Sheridan in Packed to the Rafters (Seven Network)**; Luke Jacobz in Home and Away (Seven Network); Todd Lasance in Home and Away (Seven Network); Ray Meagher in Home and Away (Seven Network); Erik Thomson in Packed to the Rafters (Seven Network)	**Rebecca Gibney in Packed to the Rafters (Seven Network)**; Esther Anderson in Home and Away (Seven Network); Rebecca Breeds in Home and Away (Seven Network); Jessica Marais in Packed to the Rafters (Seven Network); Jessica Tovey in Home and Away (Seven Network)
Most Outstanding Actor in a Series	Most Outstanding Actress in a Series
**Don Hany in East West 101 (SBS)**; Roy Billing in Underbelly: A Tale of Two Cities (Nine Network); Garry McDonald in A Model Daughter: The Killing of Caroline Byrne (Network Ten); Ben Mendelsohn in Tangle (Showcase); Aaron Pedersen in The Circuit (SBS)	**Claudia Karvan in Saved (SBS)**; Justine Clarke in Tangle (Showcase); Asher Keddie in Underbelly: A Tale of Two Cities (Nine Network); Susie Porter in East West 101 (SBS); Kat Stewart in Tangle (Showcase)
Most Popular New Male Talent	Most Popular New Female Talent
**Luke Mitchell in Home and Away (Seven Network)**; Charlie Pickering in The 7pm Project (Network Ten); Matt Preston in Masterchef Australia (Network Ten); James Stewart in Packed to the Rafters (Seven Network); Josh Thomas in Talkin' 'Bout Your Generation (Network Ten)	**Carrie Bickmore in The 7pm Project (Network Ten)**; Kate Bell in Home and Away (Seven Network); Ashleigh Brewer in Neighbours (Network Ten); Mirrah Foulkes in All Saints: Medical Response Unit (Seven Network); Katherine Hicks in Rescue: Special Ops (Nine Network)
Most Outstanding New Talent	Most Popular Presenter
**Matt Preston in MasterChef Australia (Network Ten)**; Anastasia Feneri in My Place (ABC3); Anna Hutchison in Underbelly: A Tale of Two Cities (Nine Network); Camille Keenan in Satisfaction (Showcase); Eva Lazzaro in Tangle (Showcase)	**Shaun Micallef in Talkin' 'Bout Your Generation (Network Ten)**; Natalie Bassingthwaighte in So You Think You Can Dance Australia (Nine Network); Melissa Doyle in Sunrise and The Zoo (Seven Network); Adam Hills in Spicks and Specks (ABC1); Rove McManus in Rove and Are You Smarter Than a 5th Grader? (Network Ten)

=== Most Popular Programs ===
Most Popular Drama Series	Most Popular Light Entertainment Program
**Packed to the Rafters (Seven Network)**; All Saints: Medical Response Unit (Seven Network); Home and Away (Seven Network); Neighbours (Network Ten); Underbelly: A Tale of Two Cities (Nine Network)	**Talkin' 'Bout Your Generation (Network Ten)**; Deal or No Deal (Seven Network); Hey Hey It's Saturday: The Reunion (Nine Network); Spicks and Specks (ABC1); Sunrise (Seven Network)
Most Popular Lifestyle Program	Most Popular Factual Program
**Better Homes and Gardens (Seven Network)**; Domestic Blitz (Nine Network); Getaway (Nine Network); Ready Steady Cook (Network Ten); Top Gear Australia (SBS)	**Bondi Rescue (Network Ten)**; Border Security: Australia's Front Line (Seven Network); Find My Family (Seven Network); RPA (Nine Network); RSPCA Animal Rescue (Seven Network)
Most Popular Sports Program	Most Popular Reality Program
**The NRL Footy Show (Nine Network)**; The AFL Footy Show (Nine Network); Before the Game (Network Ten); Sports Tonight (Network Ten); Wide World of Sports (Nine Network)	**MasterChef Australia (Network Ten)**; Dancing with the Stars (Seven Network); So You Think You Can Dance Australia (Network Ten); The Biggest Loser (Network Ten); The Farmer Wants a Wife (Nine Network)

=== Most Outstanding Programs ===
Most Outstanding Drama Series, Miniseries or Telemovie	Most Outstanding Light Entertainment
**East West 101 (SBS)**; A Model Daughter: The Killing of Caroline Byrne (Network Ten); Packed to the Rafters (Seven Network); Tangle (Showcase); Underbelly: A Tale of Two Cities (Nine Network)	**Talkin' 'Bout Your Generation (Network Ten)**; Chandon Pictures (Movie Network); Thank God You're Here (Seven Network); The Chaser's War on Everything (ABC1); Wilfred (SBS)
Most Outstanding Sports Coverage	Most Outstanding News Coverage
**Supercheap Auto Bathurst 1000 (Seven Network)**; 2009 AFL Grand Final (Network Ten); 2009 Australian Golf Open (ABC1); 2009 NRL Grand Final (Nine Network); Emirates Melbourne Cup Carnival (Seven Network)	**"Victorian Bushfires", Seven News (Seven Network)**; "Bushfire Disaster", Ten News Victoria (Network Ten); "Godwin Grech", ABC News (ABC1); "Samoan Tsunami", Nine News (Nine Network); "Victorian Bushfires", ABC News (ABC1)
Most Outstanding Children's Program	Most Outstanding Public Affairs Report
**My Place (ABC3)**; Camp Orange: The Final Frontier (Nickelodeon); Dirtgirlworld (ABC1); Hi-5 (Nine Network); The Elephant Princess (Network Ten)	**"Code of Silence", Four Corners (ABC1)**; "Liberal Leadership Meltdown" (Sky News Australia); "Matthew Johns Interview", A Current Affair (Nine Network); "Proof of Life", Australian Story (ABC1); "Rising from the Ashes", 60 Minutes (Nine Network)
Most Outstanding Factual Program
**Law and Disorder (SBS)**; Bombora: The Story of Australian Surfing (ABC1); Bondi Rescue (Network Ten); Darwin's Brave New World (ABC1); Last Chance Saloon (SBS)
