= Logie Award for Most Outstanding Children's Program =

Australian television award

- Country: Australia
- Presented by: TV Week
- First award: 2000
- Currently held by: Crazy Fun Park (2023)

Highlights
- Most awards: Hi-5, Round the Twist, My Place, Dance Academy, Nowhere Boys and Bluey (2)
- Website: www.tvweeklogieawards.com.au

The Silver Logie for Most Outstanding Children's Program is an award presented annually at the Australian TV Week Logie Awards. It was first awarded at the 42nd Annual TV Week Logie Awards in 2000, and is given to honour an outstanding Australian children's television program. The winner and nominees of this award are chosen by television industry juries. Hi-5, Round the Twist, My Place, Dance Academy, Nowhere Boys and Bluey hold the record for the most wins, with two each.

== Winners and nominees ==
Year	Program	Network	Ref
2000	Hi-5‡	Nine Network	
2000	Bananas in Pyjamas	ABC TV	
2000	Play School	ABC TV	
2000	Thunderstone	ABC TV	
2001	Hi-5‡	Nine Network	
2001	Round the Twist‡	ABC TV	
2001	Crash Zone	Seven Network	
2001	Eugenie Sandler P.I.	ABC TV	
2002	Round the Twist‡	ABC TV	
2002	Crash Zone (Season 2)	Seven Network	
2002	Cybergirl (Episode 1)	Network Ten	
2002	Hi-5	Nine Network	
2002	Southern Cross	Nine Network	
2003	Tracey McBean‡	ABC TV	
2003	Hi-5	Nine Network	
2003	Horace and Tina	Network Ten	
2003	Lights, Camera, Action, Wiggles!	ABC TV	
2003	Totally Wild	Network Ten	
2004	Bootleg‡	ABC TV	
2004	The Big Arvo	Seven Network	
2004	Ocean Star	Network Ten	
2004	Out There	ABC TV	
2004	Pirate Islands	Network Ten	
2005	Out There (Series 2)‡	ABC TV	
2005	Bambaloo	Seven Network	
2005	Hi-5	Nine Network	
2005	Noah & Saskia	ABC TV	
2005	Wicked Science	Network Ten	
2006	Blue Water High‡	ABC TV	
2006	Camp Orange	Nickelodeon	
2006	Hi-5	Nine Network	
2006	Scope	Network Ten	
2006	Wicked Science	Network Ten	
2007	The Upside Down Show‡	Nick Jr.	
2007	Blue Water High	ABC TV	
2007	Camp Orange: Slimey Hollow	Nickelodeon	
2007	H_{2}O: Just Add Water	Network Ten	
2007	Mortified	Nine Network	
2008	Lockie Leonard‡	Nine Network	
2008	Animalia	Network Ten	
2008	Hi-5	Nine Network	
2008	H_{2}O: Just Add Water	Network Ten	
2008	Totally Wild: Antarctica Special	Network Ten	
2009	H_{2}O: Just Add Water‡	Network Ten	
2009	As the Bell Rings	Disney Channel	
2009	Dogstar	Nine Network	
2009	Figaro Pho	ABC1	
2009	Nickelodeon Australian Kids' Choice Awards	Nickelodeon	
2010	My Place‡	ABC3	
2010	Camp Orange: The Final Frontier	Nickelodeon	
2010	Dirtgirlworld	ABC1	
2010	Hi-5	Nine Network	
2010	The Elephant Princess	Network Ten	
2011	Dance Academy‡	ABC3	
2011	Camp Orange: Castle Mountain	Nickelodeon	
2011	Dead Gorgeous	ABC3	
2011	Hi-5	Nine Network	
2011	Prank Patrol	ABC3	
2012	My Place‡	ABC3	
2012	Camp Orange: Wrong Town	Nickelodeon	
2012	Lockie Leonard	Nine Network	
2012	Saturday Disney	Seven Network	
2012	Scope	Network Ten	
2013	Dance Academy‡	ABC3	
2013	The Adventures of Figaro Pho	ABC3	
2013	Didi and B.	Nick Jr.	
2013	Totally Wild	Network Ten	
2013	You're Skitting Me	ABC3	
2014	Nowhere Boys‡	ABC3	
2014	Dance Academy	ABC3	
2014	Move It Mob Style	NITV	
2014	Play Along with Sam	Nick Jr.	
2014	Play School	ABC 4 Kids	
2015	Nowhere Boys‡	ABC3	
2015	Bushwhacked!	ABC3	
2015	Move It Mob Style	NITV	
2015	Tashi	7TWO	
2015	Worst Year of My Life Again	ABC3	
2016	Ready for This‡	ABC3	
2016	Bottersnikes and Gumbles	Seven Network	
2016	Bushwhacked!	ABC3	
2016	Little Lunch	ABC3	
2016	Play Along with Sam	Nick Jr.	
2017	Little Lunch: The Nightmare Before Graduation‡	ABC ME	
2017	Beat Bugs	Seven Network	
2017	Bottersnikes and Gumbles	Seven Network	
2017	Nowhere Boys: Two Moons Rising	ABC ME	
2017	Tomorrow When The War Began	ABC ME	
2018	Little J & Big Cuz‡	NITV	
2018	Crash The Bash	Nickelodeon	
2018	Get Arty	Seven Network	
2018	Grace Beside Me	NITV	
2018	Mustangs FC	ABC ME	
2019	Bluey‡	ABC	
2019	Grace Beside Me	SBS/NITV	
2019	Mustangs FC	ABC	
2019	Teenage Boss	ABC	
2019	The Bureau of Magical Things	Network Ten	
2022	Bluey‡	ABC	
2022	Dive Club	Network Ten/Netflix	
2022	Hardball	ABC	
2022	Little J & Big Cuz	NITV/ABC	
2022	Mikki Vs The World	ABC	
2023
2023	Crazy Fun Park‡	ABC	
2023	Barrumbi Kids	SBS	
2023	Bluey	ABC	
2023	Surviving Summer	Netflix	
2023	Turn Up The Volume	ABC	
2023	Ultimate Classroom	Network Ten	

== Multiple wins/nominations ==
Number	Program
Wins
2	Hi-5
2	Round the Twist
2	My Place
2	Dance Academy
2	Nowhere Boys
2	Bluey
Nominations
9	Hi-5
5	Camp Orange
3	Dance Academy
3	Totally Wild
3	H_{2}O: Just Add Water
3	Bluey
2	Play School
2	Round the Twist
2	Crash Zone
2	Out There
2	Wicked Science
2	Blue Water High
2	Lockie Leonard
2	Scope
2	Figaro Pho
2	My Place
2	Nowhere Boys
2	Move It Mob Style
2	Bushwhacked!
2	Play Along with Sam
2	Bottersnikes and Gumbles
2	Grace Beside Me
2	Mustangs FC
