= Logie Award for Most Popular Actress =

Australian award

- Country: Australia
- Presented by: TV Week
- First award: 1977
- Currently held by: Kitty Flanagan (2023)

Highlights
- Most awards: Lisa McCune and Asher Keddie (5)
- Website: www.tvweeklogieawards.com.au

The Logie Award for Most Popular Actress is an award presented annually at the Australian TV Week Logie Awards. The award recognises the popularity of an actress in an Australian program. Commonly known as the Silver Logie for Best Actress, it has undergone several official changes of name. It was first awarded at the 19th Annual TV Week Logie Awards, held in 1977 when the award was originally called Most Popular Australian Lead Actress. It was later renamed Most Popular Actress and briefly Best Actress (2016–2017). For the 2018 ceremony, the award category name was reverted to Most Popular Actress.

The winner and nominees of Most Popular Actress are chosen by the public through an online voting survey on the TV Week website. Lisa McCune and Asher Keddie hold the record for the most wins, with five each, followed by Georgie Parker with four wins.

== Winners and nominees ==
Key	Meaning
‡	Indicates the winning actress

Year	Nominees	Program(s)	Network	Ref
1977	Ros Spiers‡	Power Without Glory	ABC	
1978	Lorraine Bayly‡	The Sullivans	Nine Network	
1979	Lorraine Bayly‡	The Sullivans	Nine Network	
1980	Paula Duncan‡	Cop Shop	Seven Network	
1981	Paula Duncan‡	Cop Shop	Seven Network	
1982	Val Lehman‡	Prisoner	Network Ten	
1983	Rowena Wallace‡	Sons and Daughters	Seven Network	
1984	Rowena Wallace‡	Sons and Daughters	Seven Network	
1985	Anne Tenney‡	A Country Practice	Seven Network	
1986	Anne Tenney‡	A Country Practice	Seven Network	
1987	Kylie Minogue‡	Neighbours	Network Ten	
1988	Kylie Minogue‡	Neighbours	Network Ten	
1989	Annie Jones‡	Neighbours	Network Ten	
1990	Rachel Friend‡	Neighbours	Network Ten	
1991	Georgie Parker‡	A Country Practice	Seven Network	
1992	Georgie Parker‡	A Country Practice	Seven Network	
1993	Georgie Parker‡	A Country Practice	Seven Network	
1994	Sonia Todd‡	Police Rescue	ABC TV	
1995	Melissa George‡	Home and Away	Seven Network	
1996	Lisa McCune‡	Blue Heelers	Seven Network	
1997	Lisa McCune‡	Blue Heelers	Seven Network	
1998	Lisa McCune‡	Blue Heelers	Seven Network	
1998	Belinda Emmett	Home and Away	Seven Network	
1998	Rebecca Gibney	Halifax f.p.	Nine Network	
1998	Catherine McClements	Water Rats	Nine Network	
1998	Kristy Wright	Home and Away	Seven Network	
1999	Lisa McCune‡	Blue Heelers	Seven Network	
1999	Belinda Emmett	Home and Away	Seven Network	
1999	Rebecca Gibney	Halifax f.p.	Nine Network	
1999	Georgie Parker	All Saints	Seven Network	
2000	Lisa McCune‡	Blue Heelers	Seven Network	
2000	Lucy Bell	Grass Roots	ABC TV	
2000	Georgie Parker	All Saints	Seven Network	
2000	Sigrid Thornton	SeaChange	ABC TV	
2001	Georgie Parker‡	All Saints	Seven Network	
2001	Bec Cartwright	Home and Away	Seven Network	
2001	Rebecca Gibney	Halifax f.p.	Nine Network	
2001	Sigrid Thornton	SeaChange	ABC TV	
2002	Libby Tanner‡	All Saints	Seven Network	
2002	Rebecca Gibney	Halifax f.p.	Nine Network	
2002	Claudia Karvan	The Secret Life of Us	Network Ten	
2002	Ada Nicodemou	Home and Away	Seven Network	
2002	Georgie Parker	All Saints	Seven Network	
2003	Libby Tanner‡	All Saints	Seven Network	
2003	Bridie Carter	McLeod's Daughters	Nine Network	
2003	Lisa Chappell	McLeod's Daughters	Nine Network	
2003	Claudia Karvan	The Secret Life of Us	Network Ten	
2003	Georgie Parker	All Saints	Seven Network	
2004	Lisa Chappell‡	McLeod's Daughters	Nine Network	
2004	Bridie Carter	McLeod's Daughters	Nine Network	
2004	Bec Cartwright	Home and Away	Seven Network	
2004	Delta Goodrem	Neighbours	Network Ten	
2004	Tammin Sursok	Home and Away	Seven Network	
2005	Bec Cartwright‡	Home and Away	Seven Network	
2005	Jane Allsop	Blue Heelers	Seven Network	
2005	Bridie Carter	McLeod's Daughters	Nine Network	
2005	Gina Riley	Kath & Kim	ABC TV	
2005	Magda Szubanski	Kath & Kim	ABC TV	
2006	Kate Ritchie‡	Home and Away	Seven Network	
2006	Natalie Bassingthwaighte	Neighbours	Network Ten	
2006	Bridie Carter	McLeod's Daughters	Nine Network	
2006	Bec Hewitt	Home and Away	Seven Network	
2006	Ada Nicodemou	Home and Away	Seven Network	
2007	Kate Ritchie‡	Home and Away	Seven Network	
2007	Natalie Bassingthwaighte	Neighbours	Network Ten	
2007	Natalie Blair	Neighbours	Network Ten	
2007	Rachael Carpani	McLeod's Daughters	Nine Network	
2007	Simmone Jade Mackinnon	McLeod's Daughters	Nine Network	
2008	Kate Ritchie‡	Home and Away	Seven Network	
2008	Natalie Blair	Neighbours	Network Ten	
2008	Simmone Jade Mackinnon	McLeod's Daughters	Nine Network	
2008	Lisa McCune	Sea Patrol	Nine Network	
2008	Magda Szubanski	Kath & Kim	Seven Network	
2009	Rebecca Gibney‡	Packed to the Rafters	Seven Network	
2009	Jodi Gordon	Home and Away	Seven Network	
2009	Simmone Jade Mackinnon	McLeod's Daughters	Nine Network	
2009	Kate Ritchie	Home and Away	Seven Network	
2009	Kat Stewart	Underbelly	Nine Network	
2010	Rebecca Gibney‡	Packed to the Rafters	Seven Network	
2010	Esther Anderson	Home and Away	Seven Network	
2010	Rebecca Breeds	Home and Away	Seven Network	
2010	Jessica Marais	Packed to the Rafters	Seven Network	
2010	Jessica Tovey	Home and Away	Seven Network	
2011	Asher Keddie‡	Offspring	Network Ten	
2011	Rebecca Gibney	Packed to the Rafters	Seven Network	
2011	Jessica Marais	Packed to the Rafters	Seven Network	
2011	Margot Robbie	Neighbours	Network Ten	
2011	Zoe Ventoura	Packed to the Rafters	Seven Network	
2012	Asher Keddie‡	Offspring	Network Ten	
2012	Asher Keddie‡	Paper Giants: The Birth of Cleo	ABC1	
2012	Esther Anderson	Home and Away	Seven Network	
2012	Danielle Cormack	Underbelly: Razor	Nine Network	
2012	Danielle Cormack	East West 101	SBS	
2012	Rebecca Gibney	Packed to the Rafters	Seven Network	
2012	Jessica Marais	Packed to the Rafters	Seven Network	
2013	Asher Keddie‡	Offspring	Network Ten	
2013	Ashleigh Cummings	Puberty Blues	Network Ten	
2013	Ashleigh Cummings	Miss Fisher's Murder Mysteries	ABC1	
2013	Rebecca Gibney	Packed to the Rafters	Seven Network	
2013	Deborah Mailman	Mabo	ABC1	
2013	Deborah Mailman	Redfern Now	ABC1	
2013	Deborah Mailman	Offspring	Network Ten	
2013	Julia Morris	House Husbands	Nine Network	
2014	Asher Keddie‡	Offspring	Network Ten	
2014	Essie Davis	Miss Fisher's Murder Mysteries	ABC1	
2014	Marta Dusseldorp	A Place to Call Home	Seven Network	
2014	Rebecca Gibney	Packed to the Rafters	Seven Network	
2014	Julia Morris	House Husbands	Nine Network	
2015	Asher Keddie‡	Offspring	Network Ten	
2015	Asher Keddie‡	Party Tricks	Network Ten	
2015	Jessica Marais	Carlotta	ABC	
2015	Jessica Marais	Love Child	Nine Network	
2015	Mandy McElhinney	Love Child	Nine Network	
2015	Julia Morris	House Husbands	Nine Network	
2015	Bonnie Sveen	Home and Away	Seven Network	
2016	Jessica Marais‡	Love Child	Nine Network	
2016	Essie Davis	Miss Fisher's Murder Mysteries	ABC	
2016	Marta Dusseldorp	A Place to Call Home	SoHo	
2016	Julia Morris	House Husbands	Nine Network	
2016	Bonnie Sveen	Home and Away	Seven Network	
2017	Jessica Marais‡	Love Child	Nine Network	
2017	Jessica Marais‡	The Wrong Girl	Network Ten	
2017	Asher Keddie	Offspring	Network Ten	
2017	Deborah Mailman	Cleverman	ABC	
2017	Deborah Mailman	Jack Irish	ABC	
2017	Deborah Mailman	Offspring	Network Ten	
2017	Deborah Mailman	Wolf Creek	Stan	
2017	Jessica Mauboy	The Secret Daughter	Seven Network	
2017	Marta Dusseldorp	A Place to Call Home	Showcase	
2017	Marta Dusseldorp	Jack Irish	ABC	
2017	Marta Dusseldorp	Janet King	ABC	
2018	Jessica Marais‡	Love Child	Nine Network	
2018	Jessica Marais‡	The Wrong Girl	Network Ten	
2018	Asher Keddie	Offspring	Network Ten	
2018	Celia Pacquola	Rosehaven	ABC	
2018	Celia Pacquola	Utopia	ABC	
2018	Deborah Mailman	Cleverman	ABC	
2018	Julia Morris	House Husbands	Nine Network	
2019	Deborah Mailman‡	Bite Club	Nine Network	
2019	Deborah Mailman‡	Mystery Road	ABC	
2019	Asher Keddie	The Cry	ABC	
2019	Celia Pacquola	Rosehaven	ABC	
2019	Eve Morey	Neighbours	Network Ten	
2019	Jenna Coleman	The Cry	ABC	
2019	Marta Dusseldorp	A Place To Call Home	Foxtel	
2019	Marta Dusseldorp	Jack Irish	ABC	
2022	Kitty Flanagan‡	Fisk	ABC	
2022	Ada Nicodemou	Home and Away	Seven Network	
2022	Anna Torv	The Newsreader	ABC	
2022	Bojana Novakovic	Love Me	Binge/Foxtel	
2022	Deborah Mailman	Total Control	ABC	
2022	Sophie Dillman	Home and Away	Seven Network	
2023	Kitty Flanagan‡	Fisk	ABC	
2023	Ada Nicodemou	Home and Away	Seven Network	
2023	Celeste Barber	Wellmania	Netflix	
2023	Emily Symons	Home and Away	Seven Network	
2023	Julia Zemiro	Fisk	ABC	
2023	Lynne McGranger	Home and Away	Seven Network	

== Multiple wins ==
Number	Actress
Wins
5	Lisa McCune
5	Asher Keddie
4	Georgie Parker
3	Kate Ritchie
2	Lorraine Bayly
2	Paula Duncan
2	Rowena Wallace
2	Anne Tenney
2	Kylie Minogue
2	Libby Tanner
2	Rebecca Gibney
2	Jessica Marais
2	Kitty Flanagan

== Programs with most awards ==
Wins	Program
5	A Country Practice
5	Home and Away
5	Blue Heelers
5	Offspring
4	Neighbours
3	All Saints
