= Project (documentary series) =

Project '63 (in 1963, Project '64 in 1964 and so on) was an Australian television documentary series on Channel 9.

The 'prestige' series broadcast Australian and international documentaries. Project '66's "Next to Nowhere" about New Zealand was the first Project documentary filmed in colour with a view to international distribution.

It received Logie Awards for Best Documentary Series in 1965 (as Project '64) and 1967 (as Project '66).
