= Logie Award for Most Popular Sports Program =

- Country: Australia
- Presented by: TV Week
- First award: 1987
- Currently held by: The NRL Footy Show (2017)

Highlights
- Most awards: The NRL Footy Show (11)
- Website: www.tvweeklogieawards.com.au

The Logie for Most Popular Sports Program was an award presented annually at the Australian TV Week Logie Awards. It recognises the popularity of an ongoing Australian sports program, where the general theme of the show is sport, with the emphasis on commentary and highlights.

The award was first presented at the 29th Annual TV Week Logie Awards, held in 1987 when it was originally called Most Popular Sports Coverage. It was renamed as Most Popular Sports Program in 1993, then eliminated as a category in 1999 but reintroduced in 2000. For the 2016 and 2017 ceremonies, the award was renamed as Best Sports Program before being permanently eliminated in 2018.

The winner and nominees of Most Popular Sports Program were chosen by the public through an online voting survey on the TV Week website. The NRL Footy Show holds the record for the most wins, with eleven, followed by The AFL Footy Show with eight wins.

== Winners and nominees ==
Key	Meaning
‡	Indicates the winning program

Year	Program	Network	Ref
1987	Wide World of Sports‡	Nine Network	
1988	Cricket‡	Nine Network	
1989	Olympic Games‡	Network Ten	
1990	Cricket‡	Nine Network	
1991	Cricket‡	Nine Network	
1992	Cricket‡	Nine Network	
1993	Barcelona Olympic Games	Seven Network	
1994	AFL Grand Final‡	Seven Network	
1995	Commonwealth Games‡	Network Ten	
1996	The Footy Show (AFL)‡	Nine Network	
1997	The Footy Show (AFL)‡	Nine Network	
1998	The Footy Show (AFL)‡	Nine Network	
2000	The NRL Footy Show‡	Nine Network	
2000	The AFL Footy Show	Nine Network	
2000	Live and Kicking	Seven Network	
2000	Sports Tonight	Network Ten	
2001	The Dream with Roy and HG‡	Seven Network	
2001	The AFL Footy Show	Nine Network	
2001	The NRL Footy Show	Nine Network	
2001	The Olympic Show	Seven Network	
2002	The AFL Footy Show‡	Nine Network	
2002	The NRL Footy Show	Nine Network	
2002	Planet X	Seven Network	
2002	Sports Tonight	Network Ten	
2002	The Monday Dump with Roy and H.G.	Seven Network	
2003	The AFL Footy Show‡	Nine Network	
2003	The Fat	ABC TV	
2003	The NRL Footy Show	Nine Network	
2003	The Monday Dump with Roy and H.G.	Seven Network	
2003	Sports Tonight	Network Ten	
2004	The AFL Footy Show‡	Nine Network	
2004	The Cream with Roy and HG	Seven Network	
2004	The Fat	ABC TV	
2004	The NRL Footy Show	Nine Network	
2004	Sports Tonight	Network Ten	
2005	The NRL Footy Show‡	Nine Network	
2005	The AFL Footy Show	Nine Network	
2005	Before the Game	Network Ten	
2005	The Dream in Athens with Roy and HG	Seven Network	
2005	Sports Tonight	Network Ten	
2006	The NRL Footy Show‡	Nine Network	
2006	The AFL Footy Show	Nine Network	
2006	Before the Game	Network Ten	
2006	RPM	Network Ten	
2006	Sports Tonight	Network Ten	
2007	The NRL Footy Show‡	Nine Network	
2007	The AFL Footy Show	Nine Network	
2007	Before the Game	Network Ten	
2007	RPM	Network Ten	
2007	Sports Tonight	Network Ten	
2008	The AFL Footy Show‡	Nine Network	
2008	Inside Cricket	Fox Sports 1	
2008	The NRL Footy Show	Nine Network	
2008	Sports Tonight	Network Ten	
2008	The World Game	SBS	
2009	The NRL Footy Show‡	Nine Network	
2009	The AFL Footy Show	Nine Network	
2009	Before the Game	Network Ten	
2009	Sports Tonight	Network Ten	
2009	Wide World of Sports	Nine Network	
2010	The NRL Footy Show‡	Nine Network	
2010	The AFL Footy Show	Nine Network	
2010	Before the Game	Network Ten	
2010	Sports Tonight	Network Ten	
2010	Wide World of Sports	Nine Network	
2011	The Footy Show (AFL)‡	Nine Network	
2011	Before the Game	Network Ten	
2011	The Footy Show (NRL)	Nine Network	
2011	The Matty Johns Show	Seven Network	
2011	Wide World of Sports	Nine Network	
2012	2011 AFL Grand Final‡	Network Ten	
2012	Before the Game	Network Ten	
2012	The Footy Show (AFL)	Nine Network	
2012	The Footy Show (NRL)	Nine Network	
2012	Wide World of Sports	Nine Network	
2013	The Footy Show (NRL)‡	Nine Network	
2013	Before the Game	Network Ten	
2013	Paralympics London 2012 – Highlights	ABC1	
2013	The Footy Show (AFL)	Nine Network	
2013	Wide World of Sports	Nine Network	
2014	The NRL Footy Show‡	Nine Network	
2014	The AFL Footy Show	Nine Network	
2014	Before the Game	Network Ten	
2014	The Cricket Show	Nine Network	
2014	Wide World of Sports	Nine Network	
2015	The NRL Footy Show‡	Nine Network	
2015	The AFL Footy Show	Nine Network	
2015	The Cricket Show	Nine Network	
2015	The Marngrook Footy Show	NITV	
2015	Wide World of Sports	Nine Network	
2016	The NRL Footy Show‡	Nine Network	
2016	AFL 360	Fox Footy	
2016	The Marngrook Footy Show	NITV	
2016	The AFL Footy Show	Nine Network	
2016	Wide World of Sports	Nine Network	
2017	The NRL Footy Show‡	Nine Network	
2017	Monday Night with Matty Johns	Fox Sports	
2017	The AFL Footy Show	Nine Network	
2017	In Rio Roday	Seven Network	
2017	Wide World of Sports	Nine Network	

== Multiple wins ==
Number	Program
Wins
11	The NRL Footy Show
8	The AFL Footy Show
4	Cricket
2	AFL Grand Final
