= Logie Awards of 2016 =

58th Logie Awards
- Date: 8 May 2016
- Site: Crown Palladium, Melbourne, Victoria

Highlights
- Gold Logie: Waleed Aly
- Hall of Fame: Noni Hazlehurst
- Most awards: The Project (3)
- Most nominations: 800 Words (6)

Television coverage
- Network: Nine Network (HD)

The 58th Annual TV Week Logie Awards were held on Sunday 8 May 2016 at the Crown Palladium in Melbourne, and broadcast live on the Nine Network. Public voting for the Best Award categories began on 16 November 2015, and ended on 17 January 2016. Nominations were announced on 3 April 2016, along with the winners of the Outstanding Newcomer Awards.

It was announced on 4 November 2015, that the 2016 Logie Awards would reinstate the Logie Award for Best Factual Program, as well as a new publicly voted category for Best News Panel or a Current Affairs Program. Two new industry-voted awards were also given, Logie Award for Most Outstanding Supporting Actor and Actress. Additionally, all publicly voted category awards changed their title from "Most Popular" to "Best" awards.

== Digital Content ==
The 2016 ceremony will also be the first to accept nominations for original Australian content produced by or airing on streaming media such as Netflix, Presto and Stan. Comedy series No Activity, distributed by Stan, earned 3 nominations, thus becoming the first program premiering on a streaming service to earn a Logie nomination.

== Winners and nominees ==
Nominees were announced at an event held in Melbourne on 3 April 2016, hosted by Peter Helliar and Sylvia Jeffreys.

=== Gold Logie ===
Best Personality on Australian Television
- Waleed Aly in The Project (Network Ten)
  - Carrie Bickmore in The Project (Network Ten)
  - Scott Cam in The Block (Nine Network) and Reno Rumble (Nine Network)
  - Essie Davis in Miss Fisher's Murder Mysteries (ABC)
  - Grant Denyer in Family Feud (Network Ten) and The Great Australian Spelling Bee (Network Ten)
  - Lee Lin Chin in SBS World News (SBS) and The Feed (SBS)

=== Acting/Presenting ===
Best Actor	Best Actress
Erik Thomson in 800 Words (Seven Network); Firass Dirani in House Husbands (Nine Network); Craig McLachlan in The Doctor Blake Mysteries (ABC); Steve Peacocke in Home and Away (Seven Network); Josh Thomas in Please Like Me (ABC)	Jessica Marais in Love Child (Nine Network); Essie Davis in Miss Fisher's Murder Mysteries (ABC); Marta Dusseldorp in A Place to Call Home (SoHo); Julia Morris in House Husbands (Nine Network); Bonnie Sveen in Home and Away (Seven Network)
Most Outstanding Actor	Most Outstanding Actress
Alex Dimitriades in The Principal (SBS); Hugh Dancy in Deadline Gallipoli (Showcase); Malcolm Kennard in Catching Milat (Seven Network); Patrick Brammall in Glitch (ABC); Sam Neill in House of Hancock (Nine Network)	Deborah Mailman in Redfern Now: Promise Me (ABC); Essie Davis in Miss Fisher's Murder Mysteries (ABC); Mandy McElhinney in House of Hancock (Nine Network); Pamela Rabe in Wentworth (SoHo); Sarah Snook in The Beautiful Lie (ABC)
Most Outstanding Supporting Actor	Most Outstanding Supporting Actress
Tim Minchin in The Secret River (ABC); Daniel Wyllie in No Activity (Stan); David Berry in A Place to Call Home (SoHo); Ryan Corr in Banished (BBC First); Tim Minchin in No Activity (Stan)	Celia Ireland in Wentworth (SoHo); Emily Barclay in Glitch (ABC); Harriet Dyer in Love Child (Nine Network); Jenni Baird in A Place to Call Home (SoHo); Rarriwuy Hick in Redfern Now: Promise Me (ABC)
Best New Talent	Best Presenter
Adam Dovile in Better Homes and Gardens (Seven Network); Benson Jack Anthony in 800 Words (Seven Network); Dan Reilly in The Block (Nine Network); Joel Jackson in Deadline Gallipoli (Showcase) and Peter Allen: Not the Boy Next Door (Seven Network); Pia Miller in Home and Away (Seven Network)	Waleed Aly in The Project (Network Ten); Carrie Bickmore in The Project (Network Ten); Grant Denyer in Family Feud (Network Ten) and The Great Australian Spelling Bee (Network Ten); Amanda Keller in The Living Room (Network Ten); Lee Lin Chin in SBS World News (SBS) and The Feed (SBS)
Most Outstanding Newcomer - Actor	Most Outstanding Newcomer - Actress
Joel Jackson in Peter Allen: Not the Boy Next Door (Seven Network); Joel Jackson in Deadline Gallipoli (Showcase); Rahel Romahn in The Principal (SBS)	Melina Vidler in 800 Words (Seven Network); Hannah Monson in Glitch (ABC); Sara West in Peter Allen: Not the Boy Next Door (Seven Network)
Graham Kennedy Breakthrough Star of Tomorrow
Ky Baldwin in Peter Allen: Not the Boy Next Door (Seven Network); Benson Jack Anthony in 800 Words (Seven Network); Olivia DeJonge in Hiding (ABC)

=== Best Programs ===
Best Drama Program	Best Entertainment Program
Home and Away (Seven Network); 800 Words (Seven Network); A Place to Call Home (SoHo); House Husbands (Nine Network); Love Child (Nine Network)	Family Feud (Network Ten); Gruen (ABC); Have You Been Paying Attention? (Network Ten); The Voice (Nine Network); The X Factor (Seven Network)
Best Reality Program	Best Sports Program
The Block (Nine Network); I'm a Celebrity... Get Me Out of Here! (Network Ten); MasterChef Australia (Network Ten); My Kitchen Rules (Seven Network); The Bachelorette Australia (Network Ten)	The NRL Footy Show (Nine Network); AFL 360 (Fox Footy); The AFL Footy Show (Nine Network); The Marngrook Footy Show (NITV); Wide World of Sports (Nine Network)
Best Lifestyle Program	Best Factual Program
The Living Room (Network Ten); Better Homes and Gardens (Seven Network); Gardening Australia (ABC); Getaway (Nine Network); Grand Designs Australia (LifeStyle)	Gogglebox Australia (The Lifestyle Channel/Network Ten); Australian Story (ABC); Bondi Rescue (Network Ten); Bondi Vet (Network Ten); Who Do You Think You Are? (SBS)
Best News Panel or a Current Affairs Program
The Project (Network Ten); 60 Minutes (Nine Network); Q&A (ABC); Sunrise (Seven Network); Today (Nine Network)

=== Most Outstanding Programs ===
Most Outstanding Drama Series	Most Outstanding Miniseries or Telemovie
Glitch (ABC); 800 Words (Seven Network); A Place to Call Home (SoHo); Love Child (Nine Network); Wentworth (SoHo)	The Secret River (ABC); Deadline Gallipoli (Showcase); House of Hancock (Nine Network); Peter Allen: Not the Boy Next Door (Seven Network); The Beautiful Lie (ABC)
Most Outstanding Entertainment Program	Most Outstanding Comedy Program
Gruen (ABC); Have You Been Paying Attention? (Network Ten); The Voice (Nine Network); The Weekly with Charlie Pickering (ABC); The X Factor (Seven Network)	Shaun Micallef's Mad as Hell (ABC); No Activity (Stan); Open Slather (The Comedy Channel); Please Like Me (ABC); Utopia (ABC)
Most Outstanding Children's Program	Most Outstanding Public Affairs Report
Ready for This (ABC3); Bottersnikes and Gumbles (Seven Network); Bushwhacked! (ABC3); Little Lunch (ABC3); Play Along with Sam (Nick Jr.)	The Killing Season (ABC); "Catching a Monster", 60 Minutes (Nine Network); Hitting Home (ABC); "Making a Killing", Four Corners (ABC); "The Siege Survivors", 60 Minutes (Nine Network)
Most Outstanding News Coverage	Most Outstanding Sports Coverage
"Parramatta Shooting", Seven News (Seven Network); "Iraq-Syria War Coverage", ABC 7pm News (ABC); "Liberal Leadership Crisis: Abbott v Turnbull", (Sky News Live); "Migrant Crisis - Special Report", ABC 7pm News (ABC); "Paris Attack", Seven News (Seven Network)	KFC T20 Big Bash League (Network Ten); 2015 Australian Open (Seven Network/7TWO); Emirates Melbourne Cup Carnival (Seven Network); Holden State of Origin II (Nine Network); NRL Telstra Premiership Grand Final (Nine Network)

== Performers ==
- Delta Goodrem – "Dear Life"
- Jimmy Barnes
- Conrad Sewell

== In Memoriam ==
The In Memoriam segment was introduced by Jennifer Byrne. Clare Bowditch performed a cover version of The Beatles "In My Life". The following deceased were honoured:

- Jon English, actor and entertainer
- Lois Ramsey, actress
- Lionel Williams, host
- Brian Johns AO, executive
- Robyn Sinclair, writer, executive
- Bob Hornery, actor
- Carol Burns, actress
- Adrian Dellevergin, executive producer, director
- John Pinder, comedy producer
- Yoram Gross AM, creator, producer
- Harry Butler AO CBE, presenter
- Sir James Cruthers AO, pioneer, executive
- Richard Montgomery, location manager
- Lesley Bradford, news unit manager
- Noel Cantrill, sound mixer
- Carolyn Stewart, TV Week journalist
- Bruce Mansfield, presenter
- Bob Ellis, writer
- Don Battye, writer, producer
- Graeme Sutcliffe, director
- Charles Stewart, presenter, producer
- John Crook, host
- Sonia Borg AM, writer
- Adrian Wright, actor
- Peter Hudson, executive
- Geoff Brown, executive
- Sam de Brito, writer
- John Patterson, writer
- Suresh Ayyar, editor
- John Cousins, actor
- Jeff Thomas, floor manager, director
- Phil Booth, director, producer
- Brian Phillis, director
- Gunter Ericoli, sound recordist
- Chris Thomson, director
- Robert Greenberg, writer, producer
- Barbara Jungwirth, actress
- Mike Gibson, host

== Controversies during Logies night ==
I'm very upset they're not here. We're sorry they're not here, Fergo and Mac, as they always do, put the Sydney News on first. I know their regrets not being here. It's a shame.

— said Rob Rashke while accepting the Logie.

The Seven Network's, Sydney-based, news and weather anchor Mark Ferguson and sports anchor Mel McLaughlin, the winners of the Logie for Most Outstanding News Coverage for the Parramatta Shooting, were not present to accept the award personally.

TV Week had been informed a week earlier that Ferguson and McLaughlin had been prevented from attending the Logie Awards on the rival Nine Network because of their commitments to the Sydney-based 6pm local news bulletin, having to stay at Seven's Martin Place news studios that evening and throughout night, presenting news updates. Seven had offered to work around these logistics if they could be assured that Seven News had won a Logie award. In the interests of maintaining the security of the Logies results, TV Week could not release such information to the news department in advance, even in the strictest confidence. The Logie was instead accepted on stage by their boss Rob Rashke.
