= Logie Awards of 1990 =

32nd Logie Awards
- Date: 9 March 1990
- Site: Hyatt on Collins, Melbourne, Victoria
- Hosted by: Mark Mitchell

Highlights
- Gold Logie: Craig McLachlan
- Hall of Fame: Johnny Young
- Most awards: Neighbours (4)
- Most nominations: A Country Practice (7)

Television coverage
- Network: Ten Network

The 32nd Annual TV Week Logie Awards was held on Friday 9 March 1990 at the Hyatt on Collins in Melbourne, and broadcast on the Ten Network. The ceremony was hosted by Mark Mitchell and guests included Ernest Borgnine, John Travolta, Pauline Collins, John Alderton, Sigrid Thornton and Dame Edna Everage.

== Nominees and winners ==
Winners are listed first and highlighted in bold.

=== Gold Logie ===
Most Popular Personality on Australian Television
- **Craig McLachlan in Neighbours (Network Ten)**
  - Ray Martin for The Midday Show (Nine Network)
  - Daryl Somers for Hey Hey It's Saturday (Nine Network)
  - Jana Wendt for A Current Affair (Nine Network)

=== Acting/Presenting ===
| Most Popular Actor on Australian TV | Most Popular Actress on Australian TV |
|---|---|
| **Craig McLachlan in Neighbours (Network Ten)**; Andrew McFarlane in The Flying Doctors (Nine Network); Shane Porteous in A Country Practice (Seven Network); John Tarrant in A Country Practice (Seven Network) | **Rachel Friend in Neighbours (Network Ten)**; Nicolle Dickson in Home and Away (Seven Network); Dannii Minogue in Home and Away (Seven Network); Georgie Parker in A Country Practice (Seven Network) |
| Most Outstanding Actor on Australian TV | Most Outstanding Actress on Australian TV |
| **Shane Porteous in A Country Practice (Seven Network)** | **Nicole Kidman in Bangkok Hilton (Network Ten)** |
| Most Popular Actor In A Telemovie or Mini-Series | Most Popular Actress In A Telemovie or Mini-Series |
| **Jason Donovan in The Heroes (Network Ten)**; Cameron Daddo in The Heroes (Network Ten); Hugo Weaving in Bangkok Hilton (Network Ten) | **Nicole Kidman in Bangkok Hilton (Network Ten)**; Noni Hazlehurst in Fields of Fire III (Nine Network); Peta Toppano in Fields of Fire III (Nine Network) |
| Most Popular New Talent | Most Popular Light Entertainment/Comedy Personality |
| **Georgie Parker in A Country Practice (Seven Network)**; Matt Day in A Country Practice (Seven Network); Marcus Graham in E Street (Network Ten) | **Daryl Somers in Hey Hey It's Saturday (Nine Network)**; Mary-Anne Fahey in The Comedy Company (Network Ten); Mark Mitchell in The Comedy Company (Network Ten); Steve Vizard in Fast Forward (Seven Network) |

=== Most Popular Programs/Videos ===
| Most Popular Series | Most Popular Light Entertainment or Comedy Program |
|---|---|
| **Neighbours** **(Network Ten)**; A Country Practice (Seven Network); The Flying Doctors (Nine Network); Home and Away (Seven Network) | **The Comedy Company** **(Network Ten)**; Fast Forward (Seven Network); Hey Dad..! (Seven Network); Hey Hey It's Saturday (Nine Network) |
| Most Popular Public Affairs Program | Most Popular Lifestyle Information Program |
| **A Current Affair** **(Nine Network)**; Hinch (Seven Network); 60 Minutes (Nine Network) | **Burke's Backyard** **(Nine Network)**; Beyond 2000 (Seven Network); The Investigators (ABC) |
| Most Popular Telemovie or Miniseries | Most Popular Sports Coverage |
| **Bangkok Hilton** **(Network Ten)**; Fields of Fire III (Nine Network); The Heroes (Network Ten); The Magistrate (ABC) | **Cricket (Nine Network)**; Australian Grand Prix (Nine Network); Tennis (Seven Network) |
| Most Popular Children's Program | Most Popular Music Video |
| **Wombat** **(Seven Network)**; C'mon Kids (Nine Network); Play School (ABC TV) | "**Never Too Late**" **by Kylie Minogue**; "Bedroom Eyes" by Kate Ceberano; "Five in a Row" by The D-Generation |

=== Most Outstanding Programs ===
| Most Outstanding Achievement in News | Most Outstanding Achievement in Public Affairs |
|---|---|
| "**Romanian Revolution**", **Mark Burrows (Nine Network)** | "**True Believers**", **Four Corners (ABC)** |
| Most Outstanding Achievement by Regional Television | Most Outstanding Single Documentary or Series |
| **My Place, My Land, My People (QTV)** | **Ladies in Line (ABC)**; The Great Wall of Iron (ABC); Nobody's Children (ABC) |

== Performers ==
- James Morrison
- Gerry Connolly

== Hall of Fame ==
After a lifetime in the Australian television industry, Johnny Young became the seventh inductee into the TV Week Logies Hall of Fame.
