= Logie Award for Most Popular Reality Program =

Annual TV award in Australia

- Country: Australia
- Presented by: TV Week
- First award: 2000
- Currently held by: MasterChef Australia: Fans & Favourites (2023)

Highlights
- Most awards: The Block & MasterChef Australia (5)
- Website: www.tvweeklogieawards.com.au

The Logie for Most Popular Reality Program is an award presented annually at the Australian TV Week Logie Awards. The award recognises the popularity of an Australian reality program.

The award was first awarded at the 42nd Annual TV Week Logie Awards ceremony, held in 2000. It was briefly renamed Best Reality Program (2016-2017). From 2018, the award category name was reverted to Most Popular Reality Program.

The winner and nominees of Most Popular Reality Program are chosen by the public through an online voting survey on the TV Week website. The Block holds the record for the most wins, with five, followed by MasterChef Australia with four wins.

== Winners and nominees ==
Listed below are the winners of the award for each year, as well as the other nominees.

Key	Meaning
‡	Indicates the winning program

Year	Program	Network	Ref
2000	RPA‡	Nine Network	
2000	Australian Story	ABC	
2000	Doing Time	Nine Network	
2000	Kids' Ward	Seven Network	
2001	The Mole‡	Seven Network	
2001	Animal Hospital	Nine Network	
2001	Popstars	Seven Network	
2001	RPA	Nine Network	
2002	Big Brother‡	Network Ten	
2002	Guess Who's Coming to Dinner?	Nine Network	
2002	The Mole	Seven Network	
2002	Popstars	Seven Network	
2002	RPA	Nine Network	
2003	RPA‡	Nine Network	
2003	Australian Survivor	Nine Network	
2003	Big Brother	Network Ten	
2003	Celebrity Big Brother	Network Ten	
2003	The Mole	Seven Network	
2004	Australian Idol‡	Network Ten	
2004	Big Brother	Network Ten	
2004	The Block	Nine Network	
2004	The Mole in Paradise	Seven Network	
2004	RPA	Nine Network	
2005	Australian Idol‡	Network Ten	
2005	Big Brother	Network Ten	
2005	The Block	Nine Network	
2005	My Restaurant Rules	Seven Network	
2005	RPA	Nine Network	
2006	Australian Idol‡	Network Ten	
2006	Big Brother	Network Ten	
2006	Border Security	Seven Network	
2006	The Mole	Seven Network	
2006	RPA	Nine Network	
2007	Dancing with the Stars‡	Seven Network	
2007	Australian Idol	Network Ten	
2007	Big Brother	Network Ten	
2007	The Biggest Loser	Network Ten	
2007	It Takes Two	Seven Network	
2008	Dancing with the Stars‡	Seven Network	
2008	Australian Idol	Network Ten	
2008	Big Brother	Network Ten	
2008	The Biggest Loser	Network Ten	
2008	It Takes Two	Seven Network	
2009	So You Think You Can Dance‡	Network Ten	
2009	Australian Idol	Network Ten	
2009	The Biggest Loser	Network Ten	
2009	Dancing with the Stars	Seven Network	
2009	The Farmer Wants a Wife	Nine Network	
2010	MasterChef Australia‡	Network Ten	
2010	The Biggest Loser	Network Ten	
2010	Dancing with the Stars	Seven Network	
2010	The Farmer Wants a Wife	Nine Network	
2010	So You Think You Can Dance	Network Ten	
2011	MasterChef Australia‡	Network Ten	
2011	The Biggest Loser	Network Ten	
2011	Dancing with the Stars	Seven Network	
2011	The Farmer Wants a Wife	Nine Network	
2011	The X Factor	Seven Network	
2012	The Block‡	Nine Network	
2012	Beauty and the Geek	Seven Network	
2012	MasterChef Australia	Network Ten	
2012	My Kitchen Rules	Seven Network	
2012	The X Factor	Seven Network	
2013	The Block‡	Nine Network	
2013	Beauty and the Geek	Seven Network	
2013	Big Brother	Nine Network	
2013	MasterChef Australia	Network Ten	
2013	My Kitchen Rules	Seven Network	
2014	My Kitchen Rules‡	Seven Network	
2014	Big Brother	Nine Network	
2014	The Block All Stars	Nine Network	
2014	The Block Sky High	Nine Network	
2014	Bondi Rescue	Network Ten	
2015	The Block‡	Nine Network	
2015	Big Brother	Nine Network	
2015	Bondi Rescue	Network Ten	
2015	Bondi Vet	Network Ten	
2015	My Kitchen Rules	Seven Network	
2016	The Block‡	Nine Network	
2016	I'm a Celebrity... Get Me Out of Here!	Network Ten	
2016	Masterchef Australia	Network Ten	
2016	My Kitchen Rules	Seven Network	
2016	The Bachelorette Australia	Network Ten	
2017	The Block‡	Nine Network	
2017	Australian Survivor	Network Ten	
2017	I'm a Celebrity... Get Me Out of Here!	Network Ten	
2017	Masterchef Australia	Network Ten	
2017	My Kitchen Rules	Seven Network	
2018	The Block‡	Nine Network	
2018	I'm a Celebrity... Get Me Out of Here!	Network Ten	
2018	Married at First Sight	Nine Network	
2018	My Kitchen Rules	Seven Network	
2018	Travel Guides	Nine Network	
2019	MasterChef Australia‡	Network Ten	
2019	Australian Survivor: Champions vs. Contenders	Network Ten	
2019	I'm a Celebrity... Get Me Out of Here!	Network Ten	
2019	Married at First Sight	Nine Network	
2019	My Kitchen Rules	Seven Network	
2019	The Block	Nine Network	
2022	MasterChef Australia‡	Network Ten	
2022	The Block: Fans vs Faves	Nine Network	
2022	Celebrity Apprentice Australia	Nine Network	
2022	I'm a Celebrity... Get Me Out of Here!	Network Ten	
2022	Married at First Sight	Nine Network	
2022	SAS Australia	Seven Network	
2023	MasterChef Australia: Fans & Favourites	Network Ten	
2023	Farmer Wants A Wife	Seven Network	
2023	Hunted Australia	Network Ten	
2023	I'm a Celebrity... Get Me Out of Here!	Network Ten	
2023	Married at First Sight	Nine Network	
2023	The Block	Nine Network	

== Multiple wins/nominations ==
Number	Program
Wins
5	The Block
5	MasterChef Australia
3	Australian Idol
2	RPA
2	Dancing with the Stars
Nominations
11	The Block
9	Big Brother
9	MasterChef Australia
7	RPA
6	Australian Idol
6	I'm a Celebrity... Get Me Out of Here!
5	The Mole
5	Dancing with the Stars
5	The Biggest Loser
5	My Kitchen Rules
4	The Farmer Wants a Wife
4	Married at First Sight
