= Carolyn Stewart =

Northern Ireland radio presenter and businesswoman

- Born: Carolyn Ann Stewart; Belfast, Northern Ireland
- Occupations: Businesswoman; disc jockey; radio host
- Years active: 1990–present

Carolyn Ann Stewart is a businesswoman and broadcaster from Northern Ireland.

Stewart is also the owner of Totally Hot NI, an award winning food company that produces pickles, sauces and marinades.

== Radio career ==
Her broadcasting career began in 1990 when she was appointed one of the original DJs at the launch of Cool FM, sister station of Downtown Radio based in Newtownards, near Belfast. She was the original afternoon presenter with Cool FM and went on to work on many shows including the hugely successful Cool Goes Quiet, later to become Lights Out, which at that point was drawing more listeners than the breakfast show, which was then the biggest radio show of the day! Stewart stayed with Cool FM until 2005 when she was offered a frontline broadcasting role at new UTV-owned radio station U105.

One of Northern Ireland's most well-known broadcasters and club DJs, she has also worked in television on UTV, the regional channel for the Northern Ireland region of the ITV Network, co-presenting its Saturday morning youth show SUS with comedian Patrick Kielty in 1993.

She most recently presented on the Northern Irish local station, U105 in the 12-3pm week days slot. However, she quite the station, along with several colleagues during a dispute with the station management. This followed a previous dispute in December 2023 when seven of U105s presenters, including Stewart, took industrial tribunal action against the station.

== Business career ==
In 2016, Stewart set up Totally Hot NI, a food company which produces pickles, sauces and marinades. She has won six Great Taste awards with Totally Hot NI.
