= The Wrong Girl (TV series) =

- Genre: Drama
- Based on: The Wrong Girl by Zoë Foster Blake
- Written by: Judi McCrossin; Vanessa Alexander; Michael Lucas; Christine Bartlett; Claire Phillips
- Directed by: Daina Reid; Mat King
- Starring: Jessica Marais; Ian Meadows; Rob Collins; Hayley Magnus; Kerry Armstrong; Craig McLachlan; Hugo Johnstone-Burt; Madeleine West; Christie Whelan-Browne; Cecilia Peters
- Country of origin: Australia
- Original language: English
- No. of seasons: 2
- No. of episodes: 18

Production
- Executive producers: David Maher; David Taylor
- Producers: Tom Hoffie; Judi McCrossin
- Production locations: Melbourne, Victoria
- Editors: Rodrigo Balart; Nicole La Macchia; Adrian Rostirolla; Angie Higgins
- Running time: 60 minutes (including ads)
- Production company: Playmaker Media

Original release
- Network: Network Ten
- Release: 28 September 2016 – 18 October 2017

The Wrong Girl is an Australian drama television series, based on Zoë Foster Blake's book of the same name, that first aired on Network Ten on 28 September 2016.

The series follows Lily Woodward, a producer on a morning television show, and what happens when life, love and friendships collide. Longing for a life rich in romance, a dynamic career and a happy family, Lily is constantly thrown off course. As her journey continues, Lily discovers that sometimes the right choices can lead to the wrong places and the wrong choices can turn out to be the right ones.

On 4 November 2016, Network 10 renewed the series for second season to be aired in 2017, with filming beginning on 29 May 2017. The second season premiered on 24 August 2017. In November 2017, ‘’The Wrong Girl’’ was snubbed from Network Ten's announced 2018 upfronts with no word on whether the show has been cancelled or put on hiatus.

== Cast ==
=== Main ===
- Jessica Marais as Lily Woodward
- Ian Meadows as Pete Barnett
- Rob Collins as Jack Winters
- Hayley Magnus as Simone
- Kerry Armstrong as Mimi Woodward
- Craig McLachlan as Eric Albrectson
- Hugo Johnstone-Burt as Vincent Woodward
- Madeleine West as Erica Jones
- Christie Whelan-Browne as Nikki
- Cecilia Peters as Alice

=== Recurring ===
- David Woods as Dale
- Doris Younane as Sasha
- Ellen Grimshaw as Anouk (season 1, 2 episodes)
- Hamish Blake as Hamilton (season 1)
- Kevin Harrington as Ivan
- Leah Vandenberg as Meredith
- Natalie Bassingthwaighte as Gillian (season 2)
- Ryan Shelton as Bernard
- Steve Bastoni as Craig Peterson (3 episodes)
- Steve Vizard as Anthony Woodward
- Tom Budge as Jeremy (10 episodes)
- Joel Jackson as Liam Johnson (4 episodes)

== Series overview ==
Series	Episodes	Originally released	
Series	Episodes	First released	Last released
1	8	28 September 2016	16 November 2016
2	10	24 August 2017	18 October 2017

== Episodes ==
=== Season 1 (2016) ===
No. overall	No. in season	Title	Directed by	Written by	Original release date	Prod. code	Aus. viewers (millions)
1	1	"Episode 1"	Daina Reid	Judi McCrossin	28 September 2016	277129-1	824,000
Lily presents an idea for a segment for The Breakfast Bar, but when the idea fails, she must work with her colleague Nikki to put together a cooking segment with a chef named Jack. When her friend Simone writes an inappropriate email and Lily accidentally sends it to Jack, he gives her the cold shoulder. She convinces him to do the segment and when it goes wrong, Lily saves the segment from getting any worse, for which Jack appreciates her. After a work party, Lily & Simone take Jack home with them. Lily intends to sleep with him, but instead he sleeps with Simone. Lily and her best friend Pete have sex for the first time, but after he reveals he's having sex with a colleague, Meredith, Lily becomes aggravated with him and tells him to leave. The two stop talking, but after a few days they get together and Pete reveals Meredith is pregnant with his child.
2	2	"Episode 2"	Daina Reid	Judi McCrossin	5 October 2016	277129-2	642,000
Lily and Pete move on from their one night stand. Pete loses his second job as a Band Reviewer after failing to see the performance. Pete asks Lily for advice on fatherhood after he tells her he isn't sure if he is ready to be a father; he decides to tell Meredith the truth but realises he needs to be there for her and the baby. Lily and Nikki must create a TV promo for Jack's cooking segment. After Nikki changes Lily's editing of the promo to be all about Jack's physique and not cooking, Jack blames Lily for making him out as a joke and not caring about his career. Lily blocks the release of the promo after tricking Eric into thinking the video is too sexist and runs a new promo with cooking involved. Jack realises Lily wasn't in control of the video and forgives her. Eric becomes jealous of Jack when the show becomes all about him, while Lily works on a new segment with Eric to increase his popularity.
3	3	"Episode 3"	Daina Reid	Michael Lucas	12 October 2016	277129-3	654,000
4	4	"Episode 4"	Daina Reid	Christine Bartlett & Michael Lucas	19 October 2016	277129-4	614,000
5	5	"Episode 5"	Mat King	Judi McCrossin	26 October 2016	277129-5	612,000
6	6	"Episode 6"	Mat King	Vanessa Alexander	2 November 2016	277129-6	514,000
7	7	"Episode 7"	Jennifer Leacey	Michael Lucas	9 November 2016	277129-7	550,000
8	8	"Episode 8"	Jennifer Leacey	Judi McCrossin	16 November 2016	277129-8	549,000

=== Season 2 (2017) ===
No. overall	No. in season	Title	Directed by	Written by	Original release date	Prod. code	Aus. viewers (millions)
9	1	"Episode 1"	Mat King	Michael Lucas	24 August 2017	277129-9	391,000
10	2	"Episode 2"	Mat King	Claire Phillips	31 August 2017	277129-10	336,000
Lily pitches Pete's book as a segment idea for The Breakfast Bar, but when she tries to retract the idea because Pete doesn't approve, Sasha tells her they're going ahead with it anyway. Tension between Lily and Pete continues to rise when Jack invites Pete for dinner. Pete later confides in Meredith, and Meredith tells him that he poured his love and heartbreak for Lily into the book, and if he wants Lily in his life, he has to get over her. Nikki is announced as Erica's replacement on The Breakfast Bar, and while interviewing the Minister for Health, she projectile vomits on him. Meanwhile, Simone sets Vincent up on a date against his wishes, and Lily and Jack put in an offer for a house.
11	3	"Episode 3"	Peter Templeman	Ian Meadows	7 September 2017	277129-11	325,000
Pete begins his new job with Jeremy and quickly finds himself writing a segment for The Breakfast Bar. Vincent strikes up a new friendship with Alice, and as they spend more time together, Simone becomes jealous, before she and Vincent share a kiss. During a conversation with Eric, Lily realises that Jack is set to propose. While meeting Jack's brother, Lily is also introduced to Gillian, Jack's ex-girlfriend. Eric lands Lily and the show in hot water after his comments in regards to a segment on the acceptability of burkinis. Later, Lily finds an engagement ring in Jack's jacket pocket and confronting him, Jack reveals that he wasn't going to propose, at least not yet.
12	4	"Episode 4"	Peter Templeman	Vanessa Alexander	14 September 2017	277129-12	423,000
13	5	"Episode 5"	Jennifer Leacey	Samantha Strauss	21 September 2017	277129-13	477,000
14	6	"Episode 6"	Jennifer Leacey	Sarah Walker	28 September 2017	277129-14	361,000
15	7	"Episode 7"	Mat King	Samantha Strauss	4 October 2017	277129-15	371,000
16	8	"Episode 8"	Mat King	Ian Meadows & Samantha Strauss	11 October 2017	277129-16	387,000
17	9	"Episode 9"	Darren Ashton	Josh Mapleston	18 October 2017	277129-17	408,000
18	10	"Episode 10"	Darren Ashton	Christine Bartlett	18 October 2017	277129-18	360,000

== Production ==
An adaptation of Zoe Foster Blake's best-selling book of the same name, The Wrong Girl is a Playmaker Media production, and is produced by Tom Hoffie and Judi McCrossin. On 19 November 2015, Network Ten announced The Wrong Girl as part of their programming line-up for 2016. Filming commenced on 18 April 2016, in Yarraville, an inner-west suburb of Melbourne, Victoria. Production for season two returned to Yarraville in June 2017.

== Reception ==
=== Critical response ===
Comparing Marais' character to that of Bridget Jones, Holly Byrne of News Corp Australia Network went on to write, "The Wrong Girl is the right show, at just the right time for a new generation who should celebrate the joys of being single and embrace the chaos every working woman will recognise in Jessica Marais’ lead character, Lily Woodward", while Matilda Dixon-Smith of The Guardian wrote, "The Wrong Girl is light, funny and broadly appealing, well-targeted toward a swath of young female viewers who were likely getting their romcom jollies from streaming services like Netflix and Stan". The Sydney Morning Herald further praised the premiering, describing it as, "Channel Ten's next big thing", however, Daily Review were less than favourable in their review, pointing out that the show, "rated pretty poorly for a premiere, picking up just 684,000 viewers", and questioned whether the show is compelling enough for viewers to continue watching.

=== Ratings ===
==== Season 1 (2016) ====
No.	Title	Air date	Overnight ratings		Consolidated ratings		Total viewers	Ref(s)
No.	Title	Air date	Viewers	Rank	Viewers	Rank	Total viewers	Ref(s)
1	Episode 1	28 September 2016	684,000	10	140,000	7	824,000	
2	Episode 2	5 October 2016	560,000	17	82,000	14	642,000	
3	Episode 3	12 October 2016	560,000	18	94,000	15	654,000	
4	Episode 4	19 October 2016	519,000	17	95,000	17	614,000	
5	Episode 5	26 October 2016	501,000	18	111,000	15	612,000	
6	Episode 6	2 November 2016	415,000	—N/a	99,000	20	514,000	
7	Episode 7	9 November 2016	444,000	—N/a	106,000	17	550,000	
8	Episode 8	16 November 2016	445,000	20	104,000	16	549,000	

==== Season 2 (2017) ====
No.	Title	Air date	Overnight ratings		Consolidated ratings		Total viewers	Ref(s)
No.	Title	Air date	Viewers	Rank	Viewers	Rank	Total viewers	Ref(s)
1	Episode 1	24 August 2017	391,000	19	130,000	11	521,000	
2	Episode 2	31 August 2017	336,000	20	119,000	13	455,000	
3	Episode 3	7 September 2017	325,000	—N/a	123,000	14	448,000	
4	Episode 4	14 September 2017	423,000	16	96,000	14	519,000	
5	Episode 5	21 September 2017	477,000	13	104,000	10	581,000	
6	Episode 6	28 September 2017	361,000	16	88,000	13	449,000	
7	Episode 7	4 October 2017	371,000	—N/a	107,000	19	478,000	
8	Episode 8	11 October 2017	387,000	—N/a	104,000	20	491,000	
9	Episode 9	18 October 2017	408,000	19	117,000	17	525,000	
10	Episode 10	18 October 2017	360,000	—N/a	120,000	18	480,000	

=== Awards and nominations ===
Year	Award	Category	Nominee(s)	Result	Ref.
2017	Logie Awards				
2017	Logie Awards	Best Actor	Craig McLachlan	Nominated	
2017	Logie Awards	Best Actress	Jessica Marais	Won	
2017	Logie Awards	Best New Talent	Hayley Magnus	Nominated	
2017	Logie Awards	Best New Talent	Rob Collins	Won	
2017	Logie Awards	Gold Logie	Jessica Marais	Nominated	

== Home media ==
Title	Set details	DVD release dates				Special features
Title	Set details	Region 1	Region 2	Region 4		Special features
Title	Set details	Region 1	Region 2	Australia	New Zealand	Special features
The Wrong Girl - Season 1	Discs: 2; Episodes: 8	—N/a	—N/a	14 December 2016	26 July 2017	
The Wrong Girl - Season 2	Discs: 2; Episodes: 10	—N/a	—N/a	3 January 2018	—N/a	
