= Bondi Rescue =

Australian factual television program

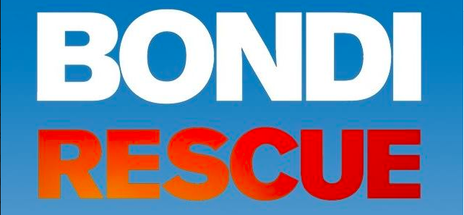
- Genre: Factual
- Created by: Ben Davies and Michael Cordell
- Starring: The Waverley Council Lifeguards
- Narrated by: Osher Günsberg
- Opening theme: "In the Summertime" by Thirsty Merc
- Composer: Kyls Burtland
- Country of origin: Australia
- Original language: English
- No. of seasons: 18
- No. of episodes: 201

Production
- Executive producers: Michael Cordell; Ben Davies; Nick Murray; Ciaran Flannery
- Producers: Martin Baker; Nia Pericles; Mark Hooper; Nick Robinson; Rachale Davies; Liam Taylor; Madeleine Hetherton; Romy Page; Warwick Burton; Toni Malone; Ashley Davies; Rick McPhee
- Production locations: Bondi Beach, New South Wales
- Cinematography: Gary Russell; Phillip Bull; Helen Patronis
- Running time: 30–60 minutes (inc. commercials)
- Production company: Cordell Jigsaw Productions

Original release
- Network: Network 10
- Release: 15 February 2006 – present

Related
- Bondi Vet

Bondi Rescue is an Australian factual television program which is broadcast on Network 10. The program follows the daily lives and routines of the Waverley Council professional lifeguards who patrol Bondi Beach.

Bondi Rescue was first broadcast in 2006. A spin-off, set in Bali, Indonesia, also screened in 2008. Bondi Rescue is broadcast internationally and has a substantial online presence. The show was created and produced by part-time lifeguard Ben Davies in collaboration with Producer Michael Cordell. It is narrated by Osher Günsberg.

On 12 October 2022, it was officially announced that the show had been renewed for a seventeenth season which premiered on 19 April 2023, after a year-long hiatus due to the COVID-19 pandemic and poor weather conditions.

The series was renewed for an 18th season at the 2023 Channel 10 upfronts.

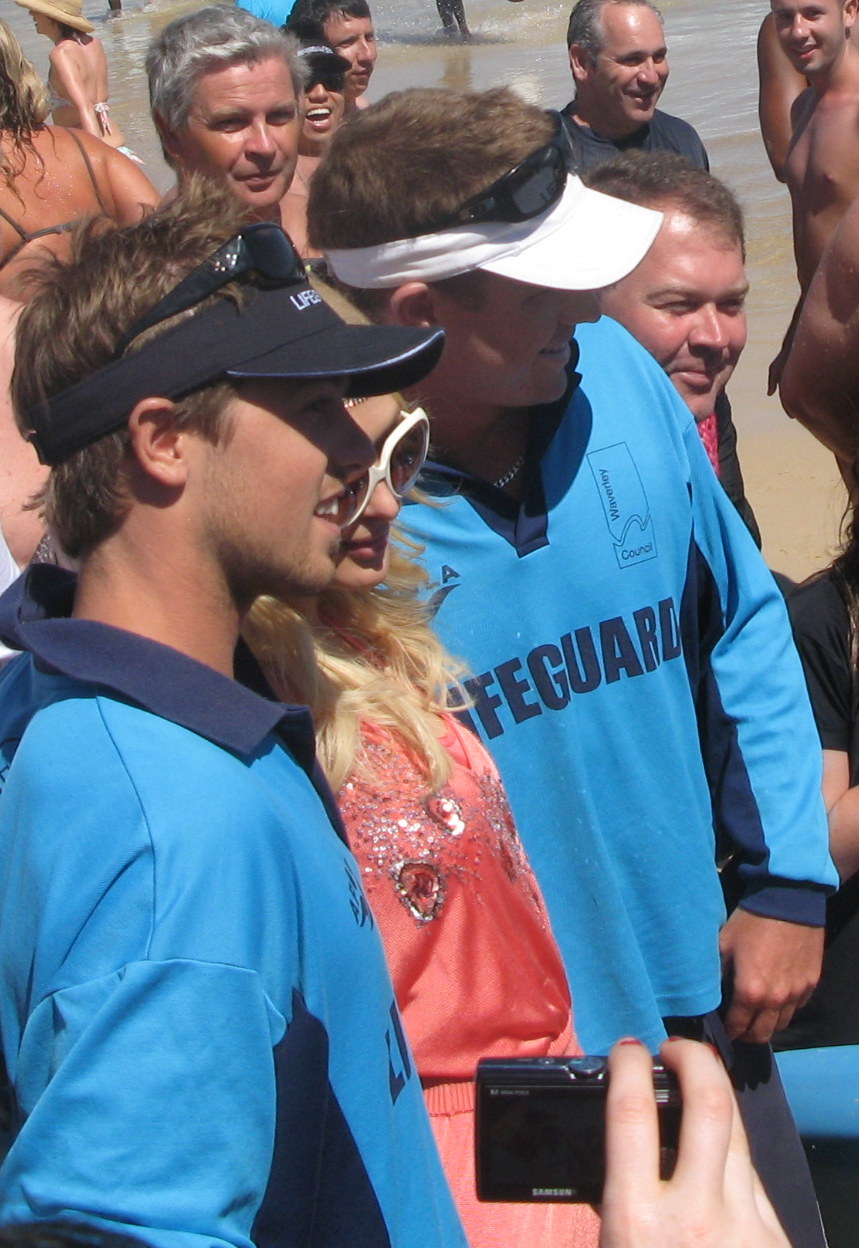
Dunstan "Dunno" Foss (black cap) and Ryan "Whippet" Clark (white cap) with Paris Hilton on Bondi Beach on New Year's Eve 2008

== Overview ==
The Bondi lifeguards perform around five thousand rescues over the summer period. They also deal with other incidents including lost children, shark sightings, bluebottle stings, injuries, drunk beach goers, perverts and thieves on the beach. Every once in a while, celebrities also make appearances on their shores; these have included actors David Hasselhoff (star of the fictional lifeguard show Baywatch), Hugh Grant, Zac Efron, Rowan Atkinson and Russell Crowe, entrepreneur Richard Branson, comedian Conan O'Brien (whose appearance was also broadcast in his own show, Conan), musician Snoop Dogg, media personality Paris Hilton, conservationist Steve Irwin and his daughter Bindi, pro-surfer Kelly Slater, and the Indian Cricket Team. Bondi veterinarian Chris Brown has repeatedly appeared on Bondi beach, meeting lifeguards, in his own show Bondi Vet.

Bondi also has its Annual Lifeguard Ironman Challenge, which tests the skills of each lifeguard which typically consists of a one-kilometre run from Bondi to local beach Tamarama, then a one-kilometre swim to nearby Bronte Beach, followed by a two-kilometre board-paddle back to Bondi. The race is handicapped: the more accomplished swimmers and board-paddlers set off from Bondi later (up to twelve minutes, depending on how many competitors there are).

Footage for the show is shot during the preceding Australian summer (usually between December and February), with certain episodes reflecting incidents that have occurred during Christmas Day, New Year's Day and Australia Day. Noteworthy incidents at nearby Tamarama and Bronte Beaches, which the lifeguards are also responsible for, are occasionally shown. Later seasons also featured footage of lifeguard trials and training exercises from the middle of the year. The training in the middle of the year is a trial to test the fitness, strength and ability of the lifeguards. It consists of an 800-metre swim in under thirteen and a half minutes in a swimming pool, a 600-metre swim surf and two 600-metre runs and on the sand, a 600-metre board paddle, then a set of demanding rescues at Bondi which should be completed in under 25 minutes. It is also a test for trainee lifeguards to show they are able and committed to the role of a lifeguard. If the competitors do not complete the tasks in the time limit, they are eliminated and do not advance to the next test.

Many rescue boards and jet skis have a camera attached for close-up footage. When deemed safe to do so, the cameraman accompanies the lifeguards out to sea and has even had to assist with rescue operations on a number of occasions.

The production company pays Waverley Council an access fee to film the program on Bondi Beach. The lifeguards are paid a separate licensing fee for the use of their images in the series.

== Bondi Rescue: Bali ==
A nine-part spin-off series, entitled Bondi Rescue: Bali and set in Bali, Indonesia, premiered on 10 September 2008. The spin-off followed two months delegations of the Bondi lifeguards (including Dean 'Deano' Gladstone, Andrew 'Reidy' Reid, Ryan 'Whippet' Clark, Chris 'Chappo/Chips' Chapman, Tom 'Egg' Bunting, Matt 'Matty' Dee, Aaron 'Azza' and Kobi Graham and mission chief Terry 'Tezz' McDermott) as they were assigned to a two-month stint at Kuta Beach, dealing with the more humid climate, a much larger beach, an exceptionally strong surf and the absence of the rescue equipment they had back home (even in ambulances), making it the world's most deadly guarded beach: twelve fatalities in an average year. They join the hundred-strong local life guards, supervised by popular singer Marcello Arayafaya, in an official international exchange program.

The spin-off failed to score ratings, and was cancelled after four episodes. However the whole series has been aired overseas.

== Reception ==
Bondi Rescue has proven to be successful for Network 10, averaging 1.31 million viewers during its third season. It won the Logie Awards Most Popular Factual Program in 2008, 2009, 2010, 2011 and 2012 and also a nomination for the Most Outstanding Factual Series at the 2010 and 2011 ceremonies. Its success also led to similar series such as the Seven Network's Surf Patrol and Nine's Deadly Surf being commissioned.

=== Logie Awards ===
Year	Nominee	Award	Result
2008	Bondi Rescue	Most Popular Factual Program	Won
2008	Bondi Rescue	Most Outstanding Factual Program	Nominated
2009	Bondi Rescue	Most Popular Factual Program	Won
2010	Bondi Rescue	Most Popular Factual Program	Won
2010	Bondi Rescue	Most Outstanding Factual Program	Nominated
2011	Bondi Rescue	Most Popular Factual Program	Won
2011	Bondi Rescue	Most Outstanding Factual Program	Nominated
2012	Bondi Rescue	Most Popular Factual Program	Won
2013	Bondi Rescue	Most Popular Factual Program	Won
2014	Bondi Rescue	Most Popular Reality Program	Nominated
2015	Bondi Rescue	Most Popular Reality Program	Nominated
2016	Bondi Rescue	Most Popular Factual Program	Nominated
2017	Bondi Rescue	Most Popular Factual Program	Nominated

== Books ==
The first book written about Bondi Rescue was by Nick Carroll and published on 1 November 2009. It was titled Out the Back with Bondi Rescue: True Stories Behind the Hit TV Show and was about the Bondi lifeguards and took readers 'behind-the-scenes' and showed their 'journeys and the effect this has had on their lives'.

A second book, titled Stories From the Bondi Lifeguards, was published on 1 February 2015 and showed a 'behind-the-scenes' look and memorable stories from the lifeguards on Bondi Rescue. The book was written by some of the lifeguards who frequented the show.

Trent Maxwell, commonly known as Maxi, published a series of children's books in 2018 about his lifeguarding experiences.

== Mobile game ==
A game based on the show was developed for iPhone and iPad. In the game, the player is a lifeguard who must keep the swimmers from drowning and protect them from hazards.

== Series overview ==
Season	Originally aired		Episodes	DVD		
Season	First aired	Last aired	Episodes	Release date	Discs	Special features
1	6 February 2006	27 March 2006	8	13 February 2008	2	Slipcase Packaging
2	5 February 2007	9 April 2007	10	13 February 2008	2	Slipcase Packaging
3	5 February 2008	6 May 2008	14	17 September 2008	2	Slipcase Packaging
4	8 February 2009	3 May 2009	13	5 August 2009	2	Hoppo rescue
5	7 February 2010	2 May 2010	13	3 August 2011	2	Slipcase Packaging
6	6 February 2011	24 April 2011	14	1 December 2011	2	Stand by (unaired episode)
7	6 February 2012	7 May 2012	13	7 May 2012	2	N/A
8	10 February 2013	2 June 2013	13	21 May 2014	2	N/A
9	3 March 2014	11 May 2014	13	No DVD, was released on iTunes Store.		
10	17 March 2015	30 Aug 2015	13	No DVD, was released on iTunes Store.		
11	15 March 2016	10 July 2016	13	No DVD, was released on iTunes Store.		
12	29 January 2017	30 April 2017	13	No DVD, was released on iTunes Store.		
13	13 March 2018	24 April 2018	10	No DVD, was released on iTunes Store.		
14	20 February 2019	2 October 2019	10	No DVD, was released on iTunes Store.		
15	25 March 2020	8 July 2020	10	No DVD, was released on iTunes Store.		
16	25 February 2021	20 December 2021	10	No DVD, was released on iTunes Store		
17	14 April 2023	23 June 2023	11	No DVD, was released on iTunes Store		
18	10 July 2024	7 August 2024	10	No DVD, was released on iTunes Store		

== See also ==
- Waverley Council – Lifeguard History Project and photos
- Carroll, Nick (2009). Out The Back With Bondi Rescue: True Stories Behind the Hit TV Show. Allen & Unwin. ISBN 978-1-74175-908-2
