= Jessica Marais =

South African-born Australian actress

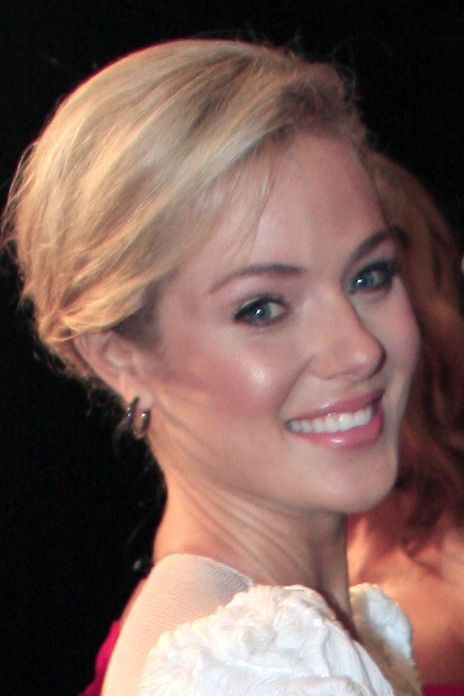
- Marais in 2011
- Born: Johannesburg, Transvaal, South Africa
- Education: John XXIII College, Perth; St Hilda's Anglican School for Girls, Perth; National Institute of Dramatic Art (BFA)
- Occupation: Actress
- Years active: 2008–2018; 2020
- Known for: Packed to the Rafters; Love Child; The Wrong Girl
- Partner: James Stewart (2009–2015)
- Children: 1

Jessica Marais is a South African-born Australian actress. She is best known for her roles in Australian television. Her accolades include five Logie Awards and nine nominations, as well as two Equity Ensemble Awards nominations.

Marais, a National Institute of Dramatic Art graduate, had her first role as Rachel Rafter in the Seven Network comedy drama series, Packed to the Rafters (2008–2013). She also had a recurring role in Sam Raimi's American fantasy series, Legend of the Seeker (2008–2010). In 2012–2013, she co-starred in the American drama series, Magic City on Starz. She later appeared in the Nine Network drama series, Love Child (2013–2017) and the Network 10 drama series, The Wrong Girl (2016–2017).

== Early life ==
Born in Johannesburg, South Africa, Marais grew up in Benoni. The family left South Africa when she was three years-old, living in Canada and New Zealand. They eventually settled in Perth in Western Australia, when Marais was nine years-old. Her father Tony, a university dean, diplomat and economist, took up a post at the University of Western Australia. Six months after arriving in Australia, Marais's father Tony died from a heart attack while returning from a family picnic. Marais was raised by her schoolteacher mother Karen. Marais later said: "So my mum and my sister and I were accidental Australians because we moved here for his job and then we were sort of marooned, but mum loved Perth, it was such a safe place to bring two little girls."

She attended a Catholic co-educational school John XXIII College in Claremont for a year, before transferring to St Hilda's Anglican School for Girls in Mosman Park.

Marais attended the National Institute of Dramatic Art (NIDA) and graduated in 2007. NIDA appearances included Ophelia in William Shakespeare's Hamlet and Charity in Sweet Charity. While still completing her final year she was cast in Packed to the Rafters, along with co-star and fellow NIDA graduate Hugh Sheridan.

== Career ==
Marais was attending NIDA when she was cast in the role of Rachel Rafter on the television comedy drama series Packed to the Rafters. She went on to earn several accolades for the role. In 2009, she won the Logie Award for Most Popular New Female Talent for her role, beating Margot Robbie and also won the Logie Award for Most Outstanding Newcomer. She was nominated for the Logie Award for Most Popular Actress in 2010 and 2011, losing out to her screen-mother Rebecca Gibney and Asher Keddie. The show was a ratings success in Australia, garnering 2 million viewers each week.

In February 2011 it was announced that Marais had left the show, with her final episode airing on 23 August 2011. Marais starred in the series from Season One until Season Four from 2008 to 2012. Marais made cameo appearances in the final episode of season 4 on 20 March 2012 and in the series finale on 2 July 2013.

Marais also starred in Rai Fazio's film Two Fists, One Heart with fellow Perth actor Tim Minchin and Daniel Amalm which was released in March 2009. Marais guest-starred in the American series, Legend of the Seeker filmed in Auckland New Zealand, playing the role of the Mord'Sith Mistress Denna. Marais underwent some fight training to do fight scenes with Richard Cypher. To mimic the character in the books, a custom catsuit, gloves and eight inch wedge boots were made for her.

After departing Packed to the Rafters, Marais relocated to the United States to pursue acting opportunities stateside. Marais was cast in Magic City, a Starz drama series created by Mitch Glazer and set in 1959 Miami, Florida, in the wake of the Cuban Revolution. Marais starred alongside Jeffrey Dean Morgan and Danny Huston in the series that ran for two seasons.

In 2014, Marais starred in a new production of Così by Australian playwright Louis Nowra and directed by David Berthold at La Boite Theatre Building in Brisbane. Natalie Bochenski praised Marais in her Sydney Morning Herald review: "She gives Julie vulnerability without being overwrought, and also puts a great spin on her second character, Lewis' self-righteous radical girlfriend Lucy."

After relocating back to Australia, Marais portrayed Australian transgender entertainer and activist Carlotta in a biographic telefilm for ABCTV Australia. Its worldwide premiere was on 19 June 2014. It was the No. 10 show of the night, and nationally won its timeslot with 811,000 viewers. Also in 2014, Marais had the lead role on Channel Nine's Love Child, where she played the character Dr Joan Millar. She has since appeared on all four seasons of this show.

Since 2016, Marais had the lead role in Channel Ten's drama The Wrong Girl. Marais was nominated for the Gold Logie in the Logie Awards of 2017 and Logie Awards of 2018.

Marais in 2018 stopped acting and withdrew from Channel 9's Halifax: Retribution and Amazon's Back to the Rafters for personal reasons. She revealed that she has depression and bipolar disorder.

Her most recent screen appearance was in the 2020 film, Chasing Wonders.

== Personal life ==
Marais was engaged to former Packed to the Rafters co-star James Stewart in 2009. However, in May 2015 Marais announced that she and Stewart had ended their 5-year engagement amicably.

Marais and Stewart have one child. Marais was reported as saying she would return to work filming the second series of Magic City while Stewart would be the baby's full-time caregiver.

In 2020, Marais was working at a café in Sydney. Her mother Karen died in 2020. Marais relocated to Perth in 2022. She lives in Mosman Park, having moved into the home of her late mother.

Marais still has family living in her native South Africa, whom she visits. Her family live in Cape Town, Durban and across the border in Zimbabwe.

== Filmography ==
=== Film ===
Year	Title	Role	Notes
2008	Two Fists, One Heart	Kate	
2010	Needle	Kandi	
2013	Planes	Rochelle	Voice role (Australian and New Zealand dub)
2015	That Sugar Film	"Actor"	Documentary film
2020	Chasing Wonders	Janine	

=== Television ===
Year	Title	Role	Notes
2008–2012, 2013	Packed to the Rafters	Rachel Rafter	Main role (seasons 1–4); guest role (season 6)
2009–2010	Legend of the Seeker	Mistress Denna	4 episodes
2012–2013	Magic City	Lily Diamond	Main role
2014–2017	Love Child	Joan Millar	Main role
2014	Carlotta	Carlotta	Television film
2016–2017	The Wrong Girl	Lily Woodward	Lead role; also co-producer
2016	Have You Been Paying Attention?	Herself	Guest Quiz Master

== Awards and nominations ==
Year	Award	Category	Work	Result	Ref.
2009	Logie Awards	Most Popular New Female Talent	Packed to the Rafters (Season 1)	Won	
2009	Logie Awards	Graham Kennedy Award for Most Outstanding Newcomer	Packed to the Rafters (Season 1)	Won	
2010	Logie Awards	Most Popular Actress	Packed to the Rafters (Season 2)	Nominated	
2011	Logie Awards	Most Popular Actress	Packed to the Rafters (Season 3)	Won	
2011	Logie Awards	Gold Logie Award for Most Popular Personality on Australian Television	Packed to the Rafters (Season 3)	Nominated	
2011	Equity Ensemble Awards	Outstanding Performance by an Ensemble Series in a Drama Series (Note: Shared with: Michael Caton, Ryan Corr, Rebecca Gibney, George Houvardas, Gillian Jones, Jessica Marais, Angus McLaren, James Stewart, Erik Thomson, Zoe Ventoura)	Packed to the Rafters	Nominated	
2012	Logie Awards	Most Popular Actress	Packed to the Rafters (Season 4)	Nominated	
2012	Equity Ensemble Awards	Outstanding Performance by an Ensemble Series in a Drama Series (Note: Shared with: Michael Caton, Ryan Corr, Merridy Eastman, Rebecca Gibney, George Houvardas, Jessica Marais, Hannah Marshall, Angus McLaren, James Stewart, Erik Thomson)	Packed to the Rafters	Nominated	
2015	Logie Awards	Most Popular Actress	Love Child and Carlotta	Nominated	
2015	Logie Awards	Most Outstanding Actress	Love Child and Carlotta	Nominated	
2016	Logie Awards	Most Popular Actress	Love Child	Won	
2017	Logie Awards	Most Popular Actress	Love Child and The Wrong Girl	Won	
2017	Logie Awards	Most Outstanding Actress	Love Child and The Wrong Girl	Nominated	
2017	Logie Awards	Gold Logie Award for Most Popular Personality on Australian Television	Love Child and The Wrong Girl	Nominated	
