= Logie Awards of 2000 =

Australian television awards

42nd Logie Awards
- Date: 30 April 2000
- Site: Crown Palladium, Melbourne, Victoria
- Hosted by: Andrew Denton

Highlights
- Gold Logie: Lisa McCune
- Hall of Fame: Bruce Gyngell
- Most awards: Blue Heelers (5)
- Most nominations: Blue Heelers (7)

Television coverage
- Network: Nine Network

The 42nd Annual TV Week Logie Awards was held on Sunday 30 April 2000 at the Crown Palladium in Melbourne, and broadcast on the Nine Network. The ceremony was hosted by Andrew Denton, and guests included Elle Macpherson, Ruby Wax, Savage Garden and Macy Gray.

== Winners and nominees ==
In the tables below, winners are listed first and highlighted in bold.

=== Gold Logie ===
Most Popular Personality on Australian Television
- **Lisa McCune in Blue Heelers (Seven Network)**
  - Don Burke in Burke's Backyard (Nine Network)
  - Georgie Parker in All Saints (Seven Network)
  - Sigrid Thornton in SeaChange (ABC TV)
  - John Wood in Blue Heelers (Seven Network)

=== Acting ===
| Most Popular Actor | Most Popular Actress |
|---|---|
| **Martin Sacks in Blue Heelers (Seven Network)**; Colin Friels in Water Rats (Nine Network); Peter Phelps in Stingers (Nine Network); John Wood in Blue Heelers (Seven Network) | **Lisa McCune in Blue Heelers (Seven Network)**; Lucy Bell in Grass Roots (ABC TV); Georgie Parker in All Saints (Seven Network); Sigrid Thornton in SeaChange (ABC TV) |
| Most Outstanding Actor in a Series | Most Outstanding Actress in a Series |
| **William McInnes in SeaChange (ABC TV)**; Steve Bisley in Water Rats (Nine Network); Colin Friels in Water Rats (Nine Network); John Howard in SeaChange (ABC TV) | **Sigrid Thornton in SeaChange (ABC TV)**; Kerry Armstrong in SeaChange (ABC TV); Rebecca Gibney in Halifax f.p. (Nine Network); Catherine McClements in Water Rats (Nine Network) |
| Most Popular New Male Talent | Most Popular New Female Talent |
| **Justin Melvey in Home and Away (Seven Network)**; Rove McManus in Rove (Nine Network); James O'Loughlin in Inside the Arena (Arena TV); Cameron Welsh in Home and Away (Seven Network) | **Jane Allsop in Blue Heelers (Seven Network)**; Holly Valance in Neighbours (Network Ten); Kylie Watson in Home and Away (Seven Network); Aleetza Wood in Home and Away (Seven Network) |

=== Most Popular Programs ===
| Most Popular Program | Most Popular Comedy or Light Entertainment Program |
|---|---|
| **Blue Heelers (Seven Network)**; All Saints (Seven Network); Home and Away (Seven Network); SeaChange (ABC TV) | **Hey Hey It's Saturday (Nine Network)**; Australia's Funniest Home Video Show (Nine Network); The Panel (Network Ten); Rove (Nine Network) |
| Most Popular Lifestyle Program | Most Popular Sports Program |
| **Better Homes and Gardens (Seven Network)**; Burke's Backyard (Nine Network); Changing Rooms (Nine Network); Harry's Practice (Seven Network) | **The NRL Footy Show (Nine Network)**; The AFL Footy Show (Nine Network); Live and Kicking (Seven Network); Sports Tonight (Network Ten) |
| Most Popular Reality Program | Most Popular Public Affairs Program |
| **RPA (Nine Network)**; Australian Story (ABC TV); Doing Time (Nine Network); Kids' Ward (Seven Network) | **A Current Affair (Nine Network)**; 60 Minutes (Nine Network); The 7.30 Report (ABC TV); Today Tonight (Seven Network) |

=== Most Outstanding Programs ===
| Most Outstanding Drama Series | Most Outstanding Comedy Program |
|---|---|
| **SeaChange (ABC TV)**; All Saints (Seven Network); Water Rats (Nine Network); Wildside (ABC TV) | **The Micallef Program (ABC TV)**; BackBerner (ABC TV); Good News Week (ABC TV); The Panel (Network Ten) |
| Most Outstanding Children's Program | Most Outstanding Sports Coverage |
| **Hi-5 (Nine Network)**; Bananas in Pyjamas (ABC TV); Play School (ABC TV); Thunderstone (ABC TV) | **FAI 1000 Bathurst (Network Ten) and 1999 Pan Pacs Swimming (Nine Network)**; Melbourne Cup Carnival (Network Ten); 1999 Rugby World Cup (Seven Network) |
| Most Outstanding Documentary or Special Report in a Public Affairs Program | Most Outstanding News Coverage |
| **Facing the Demons (ABC TV)**; "A Race to Survive", Four Corners (ABC TV); "Sierra Leone", Dateline (SBS); "The Keating Millions", 60 Minutes (Nine Network) | **"Timor", Seven Nightly News (Channel Seven, Sydney)**; "East Timor", ABC News (ABC TV); "Liberation Day in Kosovo" (Nine Network); "The East Timor Crisis" (SBS) |

== Performers ==
- Macy Gray – "I Try" and "I Can't Wait to Meetchu"
- Savage Garden – "Crash and Burn"

== Hall of Fame ==
After a lifetime in Australian television, Bruce Gyngell became the 17th inductee into the TV Week Logies Hall of Fame.
