= Find My Family =

- Genre: Documentary
- Presented by: Season 1–2 Jack Thompson
- Narrated by: Season 1–2 Jack Thompson; Season 3 Sarah McIntyre
- Theme music composer: Jay Stewart
- Country of origin: Australia
- Original language: English
- No. of seasons: 3
- No. of episodes: 44

Production
- Executive producers: Greg Quail; John Rudd
- Producer: Quail Entertainment
- Production locations: Perth, Australia
- Running time: 30 minutes

Original release
- Network: Seven Network
- Release: 26 August 2008 – 2011

Find My Family was an Australian television documentary series airing on the Seven Network. The first two seasons were narrated and presented by actor Jack Thompson. From the third season onwards it did not have a presenter, instead being narrated by Sarah McIntyre.

The series is based on an original Dutch TV-format, titled Spoorloos ('Without a Trace'), created by public broadcaster KRO and airing since 1990.

Find My Family reunites long-lost family members who have been separated for many reasons and circumstances. The absence of family members often leaves gaping holes in people's identities. These reunions attempt to fill those gaps by reconnecting family members.

Host of seasons 1–2, Jack Thompson was adopted as a child and reunited with his father as an adult. He also traced his family's ancestry in an episode of the documentary series Who Do You Think You Are?. There is also an American version airing on ABC that began airing on 23 November 2009. The US version was produced by RDF USA.

== Reception ==
The series has been popular, premiering to 1,774,000 viewers which ranked the series second for the night. The second episode dipped slightly to 1,630,000 viewers, but this rose to 1,919,000 viewers the next week. Series one had been very successful coming second in the ratings with an average of over 2 million viewers.
