= Logie Awards of 2002 =

Australian television awards ceremony

44th Logie Awards
- Date: 28 April 2002
- Site: Crown Palladium, Melbourne, Victoria
- Hosted by: Wendy Harmer

Highlights
- Gold Logie: Georgie Parker
- Hall of Fame: Mike Willesee
- Most awards: All Saints (3)
- Most nominations: All Saints (10)

Television coverage
- Network: Nine Network

The 44th Annual TV Week Logie Awards was held on Sunday 28 April 2002 at the Crown Palladium in Melbourne, and broadcast on the Nine Network. The ceremony was hosted by Wendy Harmer, and guests included Frankie Muniz and Ronn Moss.

== Winners and nominees ==
In the tables below, winners are listed first and highlighted in bold.

=== Gold Logie ===
Most Popular Personality on Australian Television
- **Georgie Parker in All Saints (Seven Network)**
  - Rove McManus in Rove (Live) (Network Ten)
  - Ada Nicodemou in Home and Away (Seven Network)
  - Libby Tanner in All Saints (Seven Network)
  - John Wood in Blue Heelers (Seven Network)

=== Acting/Presenting ===
Most Popular Actor	Most Popular Actress
**Peter Phelps in Stingers (Nine Network)**; Samuel Johnson in The Secret Life of Us (Network Ten); Ryan Kwanten in Home and Away (Seven Network); Erik Thomson in All Saints (Seven Network); John Wood in Blue Heelers (Seven Network)	**Libby Tanner in All Saints (Seven Network)**; Rebecca Gibney in Halifax f.p. (Nine Network); Claudia Karvan in The Secret Life of Us (Network Ten); Ada Nicodemou in Home and Away (Seven Network); Georgie Parker in All Saints (Seven Network)
Most Outstanding Actor	Most Outstanding Actress
**William McInnes in My Brother Jack (Network Ten)**; Joel Edgerton in The Secret Life of Us (Network Ten); Geoff Morrell in Changi (ABC TV); Matthew Newton in Changi (ABC TV); Charles 'Bud' Tingwell in Changi (ABC TV)	**Deborah Mailman in The Secret Life of Us (Network Ten)**; Kate Beahan in Love Is a Four Letter Word (ABC TV); Claudia Karvan in The Secret Life of Us (Network Ten); Georgie Parker in All Saints (Seven Network); Libby Tanner in All Saints (Seven Network)
Most Popular New Male Talent	Most Popular New Female Talent
**Ditch Davey in Blue Heelers (Seven Network)**; Conrad Coleby in All Saints (Seven Network); Martin Dingle-Wall in Home and Away (Seven Network); Blair McDonough in Neighbours (Network Ten); Danny Raco in Home and Away (Seven Network)	**Lisa Chappell in McLeod's Daughters (Nine Network)**; Michala Banas in Always Greener (Seven Network); Sibylla Budd in The Secret Life of Us (Network Ten); Stephanie Chaves-Jacobsen in Home and Away (Seven Network); Jessica Gower in The Secret Life of Us (Network Ten)
Most Outstanding News Reporter
**Geoff Thompson (ABC TV)**; Jonathan Harley (ABC TV); Paul Kadak (Seven Network); Laurie Oakes (Nine Network); Michelle Stone (Network Ten)

=== Most Popular Programs ===
Most Popular Program	Most Popular Light Entertainment Program
**All Saints (Seven Network)**; Blue Heelers (Seven Network); Home and Away (Seven Network); McLeod's Daughters (Nine Network); The Secret Life Of Us (Network Ten)	**Rove (Live) (Network Ten)**; Australia's Funniest Home Videos (Nine Network); The Crocodile Hunter (Network Ten); The Panel (Network Ten); This Is Your Life (Nine Network)
Most Popular Lifestyle Program	Most Popular Sports Program
**Backyard Blitz (Nine Network)**; Changing Rooms (Nine Network); Ground Force (Seven Network); Harry's Practice (Seven Network); Surprise Chef (Seven Network)	**The AFL Footy Show (Nine Network)**; The NRL Footy Show (Nine Network); Planet X (Seven Network); Sports Tonight (Network Ten); The Monday Dump with Roy and H.G. (Seven Network)
Most Popular Reality Program	Most Popular Public Affairs Program
**Big Brother (Network Ten)**; Guess Who's Coming to Dinner? (Nine Network); Popstars 2 (Seven Network); RPA (Nine Network); The Mole 2 (Seven Network)	**Today Tonight (Seven Network)**; A Current Affair (Nine Network); Australian Story (ABC TV); 60 Minutes (Nine Network); Today (Nine Network)
Most Popular Game Show
**Who Wants to Be a Millionaire? (Nine Network)**; Burgo's Catch Phrase (Nine Network); Sale of the Century (Nine Network); The Weakest Link (Seven Network); Wheel of Fortune (Seven Network)

=== Most Outstanding Programs ===
Most Outstanding Drama Series	Most Outstanding Mini Series or Telemovie
**The Secret Life of Us (Network Ten)**; All Saints (Seven Network); Always Greener (Seven Network); Love Is a Four Letter Word (ABC TV); Stingers (Nine Network)	**Changi (ABC TV)**; Do Or Die (Seven Network); The Farm (ABC TV); My Brother Jack (Network Ten); Halifax f.p.: Playing God (Nine Network)
Most Outstanding Comedy Program	Most Outstanding Children's Program
**The Micallef Program (ABC TV)**; BackBerner (ABC TV); Pizza (SBS TV); Rove Live (Network Ten); The Election Chaser (ABC TV); The Monday Dump with Roy and H.G. (Seven Network)	**Round the Twist (ABC TV)**; Crash Zone (Season 2) (Seven Network); Cybergirl (Episode 1) (Network Ten); Hi-5 (Nine Network); Southern Cross (Nine Network)
Most Outstanding Sports Coverage	Most Outstanding News Coverage
**Bledisloe Cup (Seven Network)**; Bathurst V8 1000 (Network Ten); Honda Indy 300 (Network Ten); Wimbledon Coverage 2001 (Nine Network); World Swimming Championships, Japan (Nine Network)	**"Afghanistan", ABC News (ABC TV)**; "September 12th", ABC News (ABC TV); "America Under Attack", National Nine News (Nine Network); "NSW Christmas Bushfires", Seven News (Seven Network); "Tampa Crisis", Seven News (Seven Network)
Most Outstanding Special Report in a Public Affairs Program	Most Outstanding Documentary Series
**"See No Evil" and "The Dirty War", Dateline (SBS)**; "The Body Snatchers", Sunday (Nine Network); "Party Tricks", Four Corners (ABC TV); "Wahid—Inside the Palace Walls", Foreign Correspondent (ABC TV)	**Australians at War (ABC TV)**; 100 Years (ABC TV); Drama School (Seven Network); Journeys to the Ends of the Earth (ABC TV); Long Way to the Top (ABC TV); The Ties That Bind

== Performers ==
- Shakira – "Whenever, Wherever"
- Elton John – "Original Sin"
- Destiny's Child – "Bootylicious"

== Hall of Fame ==
After several years on Australian television, Mike Willesee became the 19th inductee into the TV Week Logies Hall of Fame.
