= RSPCA Animal Rescue =

- Starring: Anthony Field (2007–)
- Country of origin: Australia
- No. of seasons: 4

Production
- Running time: approx 0:30 (inc. commercials)

Original release
- Network: Seven Network
- Release: 2007 – 2012

RSPCA Animal Rescue is an Australian reality television series screening on the Seven Network. The program follows RSPCA Australia inspectors rescue and protect Australian animals. The program is hosted by The Wiggles' Anthony Field.

RSPCA Animal Rescue averages around about 1.6 million viewers each week. It is shown on Sky Living and Pick in the United Kingdom, where it is shown under the name Animal Rescue to avoid confusion with the UK's own RSPCA branch.

== See also ==
- List of Australian television series
- RSPCA NSW
