= Bondi Vet =

Australian factual TV series

- Also known as: Dr. Chris: Pet Vet (United States); Ветеринар Бондай Бич (Russia); Veterinario al rescate (Spain); Veterinář z Bondi beach (Czech Republic); Weterynarz z Antypodów (Poland); Le Vet de Bondi (Quebec); De Dierenkliniek Down Under (Netherlands); Veterinären på Bondi Beach (Sweden)
- Genre: Factual
- Starring: Chris Brown; Lisa Chimes; Tim Faulkner; Andrew Marchevsky
- Narrated by: Steve Oemcke (Australia); Alex Rain (United States)
- Opening theme: "Coming Home" by Alex Lloyd
- Composer: Neil Sutherland
- Country of origin: Australia
- Original language: English
- No. of seasons: 8
- No. of episodes: 161

Production
- Executive producer: David Williams
- Producers: Jane Caswell; Anne-Maree Sparkman; Phillip Tanner; Mark Hooper
- Cinematography: Jeff Lawson, Mark Hooper
- Camera setup: Multi-camera
- Running time: 43 minutes
- Production company: WTFN Entertainment

Original release
- Network: Network Ten
- Release: 5 February 2009 – 9 July 2016

Related
- Bondi Rescue

Bondi Vet is an Australian factual television series. It follows the lives of veterinary surgeon Chris Brown at the Bondi Junction Veterinary Hospital (near Bondi Beach), and emergency veterinarian Lisa Chimes at the Small Animal Specialist Hospital (SASH), in the Sydney suburb of North Ryde.

Also featured on Bondi Vet are Andrew Marchevsky, a specialist surgeon at SASH, and Tim Faulkner of the Australian Reptile Park at Somersby on the New South Wales central coast.

The series first broadcast on 5 February 2009, with the first two full seasons averaging a rating of 0.93 million viewers in the five capital cities. Bondi Vet screened for seven seasons on Network Ten.

From 28 September 2013 to 25 May 2019, the show had been seen on Saturday mornings in the United States on Ten's sister network, CBS, under the title of Dr. Chris: Pet Vet, both as the Bondi community is unfamiliar to most American audiences, and to clarify Dr. Chris Brown as not the similarly named American musical artist. The program was slightly re-edited by American distributor Litton Entertainment to comply with American requirements regarding educational children's programming.

== Bondi Vet: Coast to Coast ==
Bondi Vet
- Also known as: Vets on the Beach (US)
- Genre: Factual
- Starring: Peter Ricci; Alex Hynes; Kate Adams; Lewis Hunt; Danni Dusek; Tim Faulkner; Audrey Shen; Alison Shen; Scott Miller
- Narrated by: Steve Oemcke
- Opening theme: "Back to Life" by Danni Dusek
- Composer: Neil Sutherland
- Country of origin: Australia
- Original language: English
- No. of seasons: 2
- No. of episodes: 25

Production
- Executive producer: Wes Crook
- Camera setup: Multi-camera
- Running time: 60 minutes
- Production company: WTFN Entertainment

Original release
- Network: Nine Network
- Release: 11 October 2019 – present

In March 2017, Brown announced he was stepping down as host due to his extensive television hosting and presenting schedule. The series production company, WTFN Entertainment, searched for a new host. Over 800 nominations were received in just a week of the announcement and it was revealed that a top 10 would be nominated and the public would decide who the next Bondi Vet would be. In July 2017, a top 5 shortlist of vets from around Australia was revealed.

In November 2017, WTFN Entertainment revealed that the series would showcase multiple vets in the next series instead of one and they would be Dr Peter Ricci, Dr Alex Hynes, Dr Kate Adams, Dr Lewis Hunt and Dr Danni Dusek. The new series would be known as "Bondi Vet: Coast to Coast" and would feature vets from locations all over Australia. In December 2018, it was announced the series would be switching from Network Ten to Nine Network in 2019. In February 2019, WTFN entertainment announced an additional two vets to the cast, with identical twin sisters Alison & Audrey Shen being included in the new series.

Bondi Vet: Coast to Coast premiered in Australia on Nine Network on 11 October 2019 at 7:30 pm and concluded on 29 November 2019. It first premiered in Canada on the Cottage Life TV network on 27 March 2019.

It was officially renewed for a second series in February 2021, which premiered on 14 May 2021, and was renewed for a third series which will air in 2022.

== Casts ==
=== Bondi Vet team ===
- Chris Brown, BVSc (Hons) – veterinary surgeon (Bondi Junction Veterinary Hospital)
- Lisa Chimes, BVSc (Hons), MANZCVS (Note: Lisa Chimes – Member of the Australian and New Zealand College of Veterinary Scientists) – emergency veterinarian at the Small Animal Specialist Hospital (SASH)
- Andrew Marchevsky, BVSc (Hons), MVS, FANZCVS (Note: Andrew Marchevsky – Fellow of the Australian and New Zealand College of Veterinary Scientists) – specialist veterinarian surgeon (SASH)
- Tim Faulkner – general manager (Australian Reptile Park)

=== Bondi Vet: Coast to Coast team ===
- Peter Ricci, BVSc, BVMS – small animal emergency veterinarian (The Animal Hospital at Murdoch University) and wildlife and zoo veterinarian (Perth Zoo)
- Alex Hynes, BVSc, MVS, MANZCVS, MBA – emergency and critical care veterinarian (Animal Emergency Service)
- Kate Adams – veterinary surgeon (Bondi veterinary hospital)
- Lewis Hunt – veterinary surgeon
- Danni Dusek – veterinary surgeon
- Tim Faulkner – general manager (Australian Reptile Park)
- Audrey Shen – mobile veterinarian
- Alison Shen – mobile veterinarian
- Scott Miller – Australian veterinary surgeon at his three veterinary practices, including Vet on Richmond Hill in London, United Kingdom
- Dr Arvid – veterinary surgeon at his veterinary practice in Atlanta, United States

== Nominations and awards ==
Year	Nominee	Award	Result
2015	Bondi Vet	Logie Award for Most Popular Reality Program	Nominated
2016	Bondi Vet	Logie Award for Best Factual Program	Nominated

== Broadcast ==
The series was broadcast in the United States, on CBS as part of their educational CBS Dream Team Saturday morning programming strand programmed by Litton Entertainment, under the title of Dr. Chris: Pet Vet. The series ran from 28 September 2013 to 25 May 2019. After 2019, it was renamed Pet Vet Dream Team. In Canada, the series is broadcast on CBC Television. In Czech Republic, the series is broadcast on Animal Planet. In the Netherlands, it is broadcast on RTL5 after TLC broadcast the show first. The RTL5 episodes are edited different in comparison to the TLC episodes. In Spain, the series is broadcast on BeMad TV.

== Home media ==
Season	Release dates	Number of episodes	Number of discs	Special features
Season 1	10 February 2011	14	2	—N/a
Season 1 & 2	3 July 2015	14 +16	6	—N/a
Season 3	3 July 2015	15	3	—N/a
Season 4	3 July 2015	16	3	—N/a
Season 5	5 August 2015	30	5	—N/a
Season 6	5 August 2015	30	5	—N/a
Season 7	3 April 2016	29	5	—N/a
Season 8	TBA	13		—N/a
Bondi Vet: Coast to Coast	TBA	10		—N/a
