= Great Detectives of Old Time Radio Live =

Australian Comedy-Mystery radio show

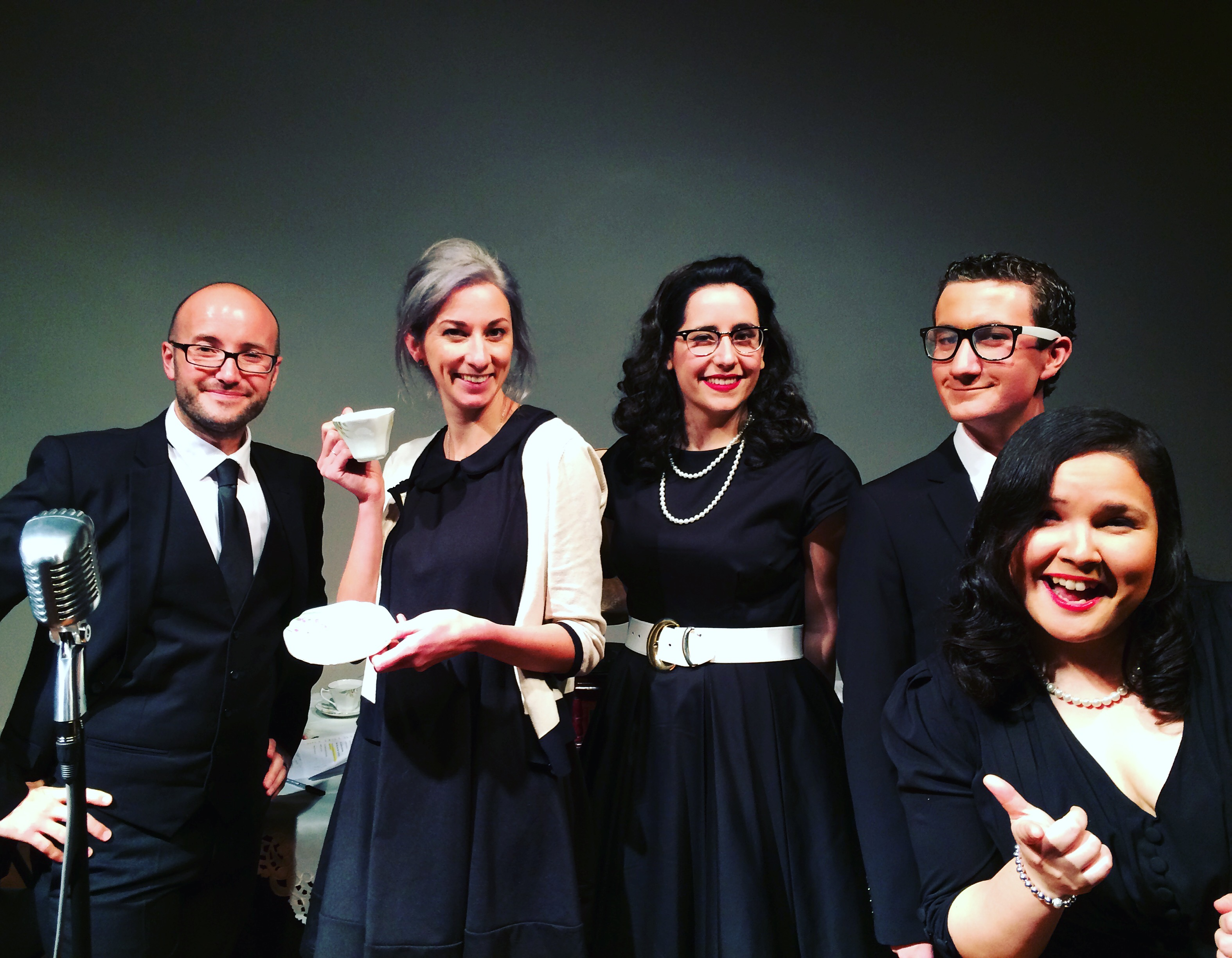
- The Great Detectives of Old Time Radio Live Cast with Veronica Milsom
- Original language: English
- Written by: Benjamin Maio Mackay
- Genre: Comedy/Mystery
- Setting: 1950s

Premiere
- Date: 18 February 2015
- Place: Capri Theatre Adelaide
- Directed by: Benjamin Maio Mackay
- Official website

Great Detectives of Old Time Radio Live is an Australian Comedy-Mystery radio show that debuted in 2015.

The original production was performed in the Adelaide Fringe Festival 2015 and premiered at the Capri Theatre.

The show was set in the 1950s and the line up of shows included Dragnet, Yours Truly Johnny Dollar and Candy Matson. Maio Mackay, Trebilco and Sciacca played the leads in each respectively.

== Production ==
The show's plot centered around recreating the experience of attending a 1950s radio drama recording. The show drew heavily on elements from the 1950s, often described as the golden age of radio drama." The original show featured three stories. The revised touring edition also featured three stories, including two Candy Matson stories and one Johnny Dollar story. The show features minimal audience interaction, and the actors can break character because they portray performers acting out radio-drama characters and are aware of the audience's presence. The show was adapted, directed and produced by Benjamin Maio Mackay.

=== Revised touring production 2016/2017 ===
In 2016 the show was revived by Preachrs Podcast OnLine & OnStage and this new version toured Australia.

The revised show featured two Candy Matson stories and one Johnny Dollar story. The cast was reduced to Benjamin Maio Mackay, Julia Sciacca, Eden Trebilco, and Jennifer Barry. The show was again adapted and directed by Benjamin Maio Mackay. It opened in September 2016 in the Sydney Fringe.

== Guest stars ==
The 2016/2017 version features a guest star in every performance. They have 6 lines across the play, but remain onstage the entire show. A variety of media personalities, musical theatre performers and TV stars have taken on the role. No guest stars appeared in Mount Gambier or in the 2018 production.

- Andrew Hansen, Sydney 2016
- Kurt Phelan, Sydney 2016
- Veronica Milsom, Sydney 2016
- Adam Richard, Sydney 2016
- Stephen Mahy, Sydney 2016
- Mark Humphries, Sydney 2016
- David Gauci, Adelaide 2016
- Graeme Goodings, Adelaide 2016
- Markus Hamence, Adelaide 2016
- Sean Braitwaithe, Adelaide 2016
- Mark Oates, Adelaide 2016
- Simon Taylor, Adelaide 2017
- Rob Lloyd, Adelaide 2017
- Peter Combe, Adelaide 2017

== Reception ==
On release, the show received mostly positive feedback.

Australian newspaper The Advertiser rated the show 4/5 stars.

=== Awards ===
The show received a number of 2016 Broadway World Award Theatre Nominations, including; Best Actor (Maio Mackay and Trebilco), Best Actress (Sciacca), Best Supporting Actress (Barry), Best Director (Maio Mackay), and Best Play.

- 2015 Adelaide Fringe Festival
- 2016 Sydney Fringe
- 2016 Adelaide Season
- 2016 Mount Gambier Season
- 2017 Adelaide Fringe Return Season
