= Disco Cuttlefish =

2014 Adelaide Fringe Festival mascot

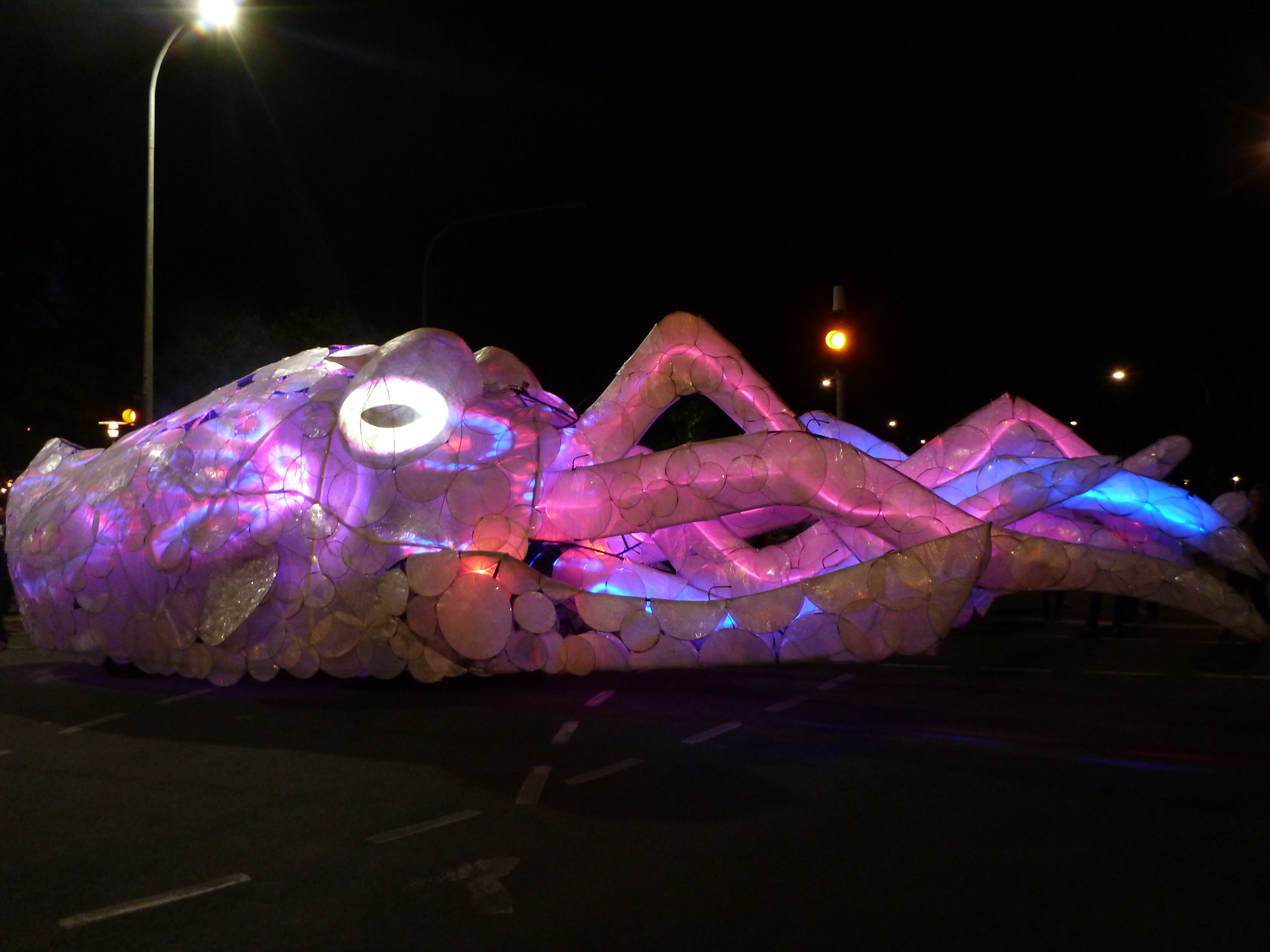
Stobie the Disco Cuttlefish at Adelaide Fringe 2014

Stobie the Disco Cuttlefish was the mascot of the 2014 Adelaide Fringe in South Australia. Its design was inspired by the cephalopod species the Australian giant cuttlefish (Sepia apama). Stobie was a 13 metre long mechanised parade float which featured blinking eyes, waving tentacles and an elaborate sound, light and dance show. It made appearances each Saturday night during the festival, accompanied by a professional dance troupe which performed a set routine. This was followed by an original dance called 'The Cuttlefish' during which crowd participation was invited. Stobie also played a pre-recorded soundtrack of disco hits including a megamix of "Stayin' Alive", "Billie Jean", "You Should Be Dancing" and "Le Freak". The opening set routine was performed to the theme-song from the 1980 dance movie, Fame.

== Development ==
Adelaide Fringe director Greg Clarke claimed responsibility for suggesting the adoption of a giant Australian cuttlefish as a festival mascot. He said that the festival team "wanted to create a creature unique to South Australia and were inspired by the uniqueness and beauty of the giant cuttlefish that inhabits the gulf waters of South Australia." The idea was first announced with the release of the event program in November 2013.

The concept was realised by a team of South Australian artists and technicians accredited as follows:

- Original drawing – Slade Smith
- Creation and construction – Steve Hayter and Martin Murray
- Lighting design – Geoff Cobham and Chris Petridis
- Music composition and compilation- Harry Covill
- Choreography – Larissa McGowan
- Performers- Lisa Lonero, Andrew Haycroft, Penelope Shum, Chris Mifsud, Kialea Nadine-Williams, Jaeger Man

A ute provided the scaffold around which the cuttlefish was constructed. Sound and lighting systems were placed in the tray of the vehicle. The finished cuttlefish changed colour, featured blinking eyes and emitted smoke as a proxy for ink.

== Sponsorship ==
The Disco Cuttlefish was sponsored by SA Power Networks. Adelaide Fringe's 2014 Principal Partner was BankSA, and its government partners were ArtsSA, the South Australian Tourism Commission and the Adelaide City Council.

== Controversy ==
The Adelaide Fringe attracted criticism for using the image of the cuttlefish without referring to the decline of the Northern Spencer Gulf population of the giant cuttlefish in South Australia. The decline has been described as 'catastrophic' by conservationists, as their population has dropped from over 170,000 in the late 1990s to 13,500 in 2013. Scientists believe the Whyalla aggregation of Giant Australian cuttlefish may represent a separate and new species, and this population collapse, if continued, may lead to extinction as soon as 2016.

The festival organisers responded by acknowledging that they were aware of the decline via Twitter and Facebook. The Twitter announcement was made on 17 February and read:

"@SaveCuttlefish Adelaide Fringe as an organisation is aware of the Giant Cuttlefish plight and we hope that by highlighting Stobie the Giant Cuttlefish in this way, we will make more people aware of the issues these creatures are facing..."

The Fringe also added a footer to the Disco Cuttlefish event page on their website, linking to additional information from the Conservation Council of South Australia.
