= About Me =

About Me may refer to:

- about.me, web hosting service
- "About Me" (song), 2004, by Hikaru Utada

== See also ==
- All About Me (disambiguation)
