= Speak Love (Hugh Sheridan album) =

Studio album by Hugh Sheridan
- Released: 27 November 2009
- Recorded: 2009
- Genre: Pop, R&B, soul
- Label: Sony BMG

Singles from Speak Love
- 1. "All About Me" Released: 30 October 2009; 2. "Speak Love" Released: 18 June 2010

Speak Love is the first studio album by Australian pop singer Hugh Sheridan. It was released on 27 November 2009 and peaked at number 86 on the ARIA Charts.

Upon released Sheridan said ""This is not a generic pop album, which may be to my detriment. I wanted to make an album that wasn't too confronting sonically, wasn't too heavy or too sad or too emotional. I think there's something in there for everyone, but there might not be anything in there for anyone."

== Background and release ==
During his time at the National Institute of Dramatic Art (NIDA), Sheridan took lead roles in musicals, and he sang during his time in Melbourne studying at the Victorian College of the Arts. In August 2008, Sheridan became a household name playing Ben Rafter in Packed to the Rafters, for which he won a Logie Award at the Awards in May 2009. Sheridan gave a demo to Sony Music Australia and was signed in August 2009. Sheridan wrote songs for and recorded the album in-between filming Packed to the Rafters. Sheridan said "I was working on Rafters from 5am to 6.30pm, then going straight to the studio, sometimes we worked all night on songs. But I pushed myself as far as I possibly could to make sure it was right... I don't think we skimped on quality." In September 2009, Sheridan released his debut single "Just Can't Throw Us Away", which peaked at number 73 on the ARIA Charts. The album's lead single, "All About Me" was released in October 2009 with the album released on 27 November 2009.

== Reception ==
An editor at Amazon.com said "The album Speak love is a contemporary collection of unique original r&b/soul pop songs".

Dan Murphy from 'Same Same' said the album's second single, "All About Me", is "[as] catchy and has a healthy dose of rock/pop sensibility" however Murphy criticised the album saying "the rest of the album is quite bland. Yes, the guy can sing but his song choices leave a lot to be desired. They don't really stand out in a crowd and will become disposable radio filling tunes within weeks of release".

== Track listing ==
No.	Title	Writer(s)	Length
1.	"Speak Love"		3:30
2.	"All About Me"	Rob Wells, Matthew Marston	3:32
3.	"Alright"		4:01
4.	"Do It Again"		3:09
5.	"Higher Love"		3:16
6.	"Never Let You Go"		4:11
7.	"Perfect Mistake"		2:55
8.	"There She Goes"		4:15
9.	"Your Love"		3:32
10.	"Nothing Hurts Like Love"		3:09
11.	"Short Skirt/Long Jacket"	John McCrea	3:26
12.	"One"		4:14

== Charts ==
Chart performance for Speak Love
Chart (2009)	Peak position
Australian Albums (ARIA)	86

== Release history ==
Country	Date	Format	Label	Catalogue
Australia	27 November 2009	Digital download, CD	Sony Music Australia	88697606352
