= I Will Survive (TV series) =

Australian television show

- Genre: Talent show
- Presented by: Hugh Sheridan
- Judges: Jason Donovan; Stephan Elliott
- Opening theme: "I Will Survive" by Gloria Gaynor
- Composer: Gloria Gaynor
- Country of origin: Australia
- Original language: English
- No. of seasons: 1
- No. of episodes: 14

Production
- Running time: 60 minutes
- Production company: FremantleMedia Australia

Original release
- Network: Network Ten
- Release: 21 August – 23 October 2012

I Will Survive is an Australian talent show-themed television series that premiered on Network Ten on 21 August 2012. The premise of the show is to search for a new, unknown talent to perform in the Broadway production of the musical Priscilla, Queen of the Desert. Due to the Broadway theatre production closing in June 2012, the prize has been amended to another performance on Broadway, along with a $250,000 cash prize. The title of the show is derived from the title of a song in the production, "I Will Survive", originally sung by Gloria Gaynor.

I Will Survive was hosted by actor and singer Hugh Sheridan, and featured judges Jason Donovan, who played Tick in the West End theatre production of the show, and Stephan Elliott, the director of the film The Adventures of Priscilla, Queen of the Desert.

== Format ==
I Will Survive searches for a "triple threat" performer, proficient in the disciplines of acting, singing, and dancing, to portray a drag queen as based on the hit musical Priscilla, Queen of the Desert. The show starts with open auditions, with the most talented performers joining the famous Priscilla bus, retracing the steps of the movie, from Sydney to Alice Springs, performing at outback locations on the way.

== Top 12 contestants ==
Name	Age	Occupation	Portrayed as	Status
Michael Snell	28	Dance Instructor	Wants to be Leading Man	Winner
Tom Sharah	24	Cabaret Performer	The Star	Runner-Up
Nathan Foley	32	Former Hi-5 member	Reinventing himself	3rd Place
Rohan Seinor	42	Mine Worker	Light hearted/Funny	4th Place
Stephen Mahy	29	Performer	Win at all costs	5th Place
Brendan Hanson	39	Performing Arts Teacher	Loving father	6th Place
Matt McFarlane	28	Former Australian rules football Player	Musical Theatre Type	7th Place
Adrian Espulso	23	Mechanic	The Underdog	8th Place
Davin Griffiths-Jones	25	Former Child Star	The Bitchy Villain	9th Place
Jamie Jewell	43	Costume Designer	Drama Queen	10th Place
Frank Kerr	22	Weekend Radio Announcer	Nice Guy	11th Place
Sean Perez	23	Luna Park Entertainer	Cry Baby	12th Place

== Challenges ==
Contestants	1	2	3	4	5	6	7	8	9	10
Michael	SAFE	SAFE	Bottom 3	SAFE	SAFE	SAFE	SAFE	SAFE	Bottom 2	WINNER
Tom	SAFE	SAFE	SAFE	SAFE	SAFE	Bottom 3	SAFE	SAFE	SAFE	OUT
Nathan	SAFE	SAFE	SAFE	Bottom 3	SAFE	SAFE	Bottom 3	SAFE	SAFE	OUT
Rohan	SAFE	Bottom 3	SAFE	SAFE	SAFE	Bottom 3	SAFE	Bottom 2	OUT	
Stephen	SAFE	SAFE	SAFE	SAFE	Bottom 3	SAFE	Bottom 3	OUT		
Brendan	SAFE	SAFE	SAFE	Bottom 3	SAFE	SAFE	OUT			
Matt	Bottom 3	SAFE	SAFE	SAFE	Bottom 3	OUT				
Adrian	SAFE	SAFE	Bottom 3	SAFE	OUT					
Davin	SAFE	Bottom 3	SAFE	OUT						
Jamie	SAFE	SAFE	OUT							
Frank	Bottom 3	OUT								
Sean	OUT									

== Ratings ==
Episode	Original airdate	Timeslot	Viewers
Episode 1	21 August 2012	Tuesday 7:30 pm–8:30 pm	506,000
Episode 2	22 August 2012	Wednesday 7:30 pm–8:30 pm	427,000
Episode 3	28 August 2012	Tuesday 7:30 pm–8:30 pm	364,000
Episode 4	29 August 2012	Wednesday 7:30 pm–8:30 pm	360,000
Episode 5	4 September 2012	Tuesday 7:30 pm–8:30 pm	391,000
Episode 6	5 September 2012	Wednesday 7:30 pm–8:30 pm	338,000
Episode 7	11 September 2012	Tuesday 7:30 pm–8:30 pm	336,000
Episode 8	12 September 2012	Wednesday 7:30 pm–8:30 pm	281,000
Episode 9	18 September 2012	Tuesday 7:30 pm–8:30 pm	358,000
Episode 10	25 September 2012	Tuesday 7:30 pm–8:30 pm	277,000
Episode 11	2 October 2012		
Episode 12	9 October 2012		
Episode 13	16 October 2012		
Episode 14	23 October 2012		
