= Adelaide Fringe =

Annual Australian arts festival

Coordinates: 34.92343°S 138.59565°E

Adelaide Fringe Festival
- The Adelaide Fringe logo using the bicolour scheme.
- Genre: Performing arts, visual arts
- Begins: Mid-February
- Ends: Mid-March
- Frequency: Annual
- Locations: Adelaide, South Australia
- Years active: 1960–2006 biennially, 2006 onwards annually
- Inaugurated: 12 March 1960
- Previous event: 20 February 2026 – 22 March 2026
- Attendance: 2.7 million
- Organiser: Adelaide Fringe Inc.
- Website: Official website

Adelaide Fringe, formerly Adelaide Fringe Festival, is Australia's biggest arts festival and is the world's second-largest annual arts festival (after the Edinburgh Festival Fringe), held in the South Australian capital of Adelaide. Between mid-February and mid-March each year, it features more than 7,000 artists from around Australia and the world. Over 1,300 events are staged in hundreds of venues, which include work in a huge variety of performing and visual art forms. The Fringe features many free events occur alongside ticketed events for the duration of the festival.

In 2023 Adelaide Fringe became the first festival in Australia to sell 1 million tickets. This has doubled from 500,000 tickets in 2015.

The main temporary venue hubs are The Garden of Unearthly Delights, Gluttony and the Wonderland and 500 other temporary and permanent venues hosting Fringe events are scattered across the city, suburbs and region. In a period in Adelaide's calendar referred to by locals as "Mad March", other events running concurrently are the Adelaide Festival of Arts, another major arts festival starting a week after the Fringe, which includes Adelaide Writers' Week and the four-day world music festival WOMADelaide, and also the Adelaide 500 street circuit motor racing event, with accompanying evening music concerts.

The Fringe attracts many international visitors as well as from all over Australia, and in 2019 generated an estimated A$95.1 million in gross economic expenditure for South Australia, which included A$36.6 million in spending by the 2.7 million attendees. Each year has brought a new record in all aspects of the festival for many years up to 2020.

Founded in 1960 as a loose collection of official (coordinated by the Festival of Arts) and unofficial events run by local artists, and initially seen as adjunct to the main Festival of Arts, the Fringe became an incorporated body in 1975, with the 1976 festival named Focus and later Adelaide Festival Fringe, before the 1992 change to Adelaide Fringe Festival. It has grown from a two-week long, biennial festival to a major annual international festival.

The Edinburgh Award, worth A$10,000, was introduced by Arts South Australia in 2017, open to local Adelaide Fringe artists who wish to tour their work to the Edinburgh Fringe.

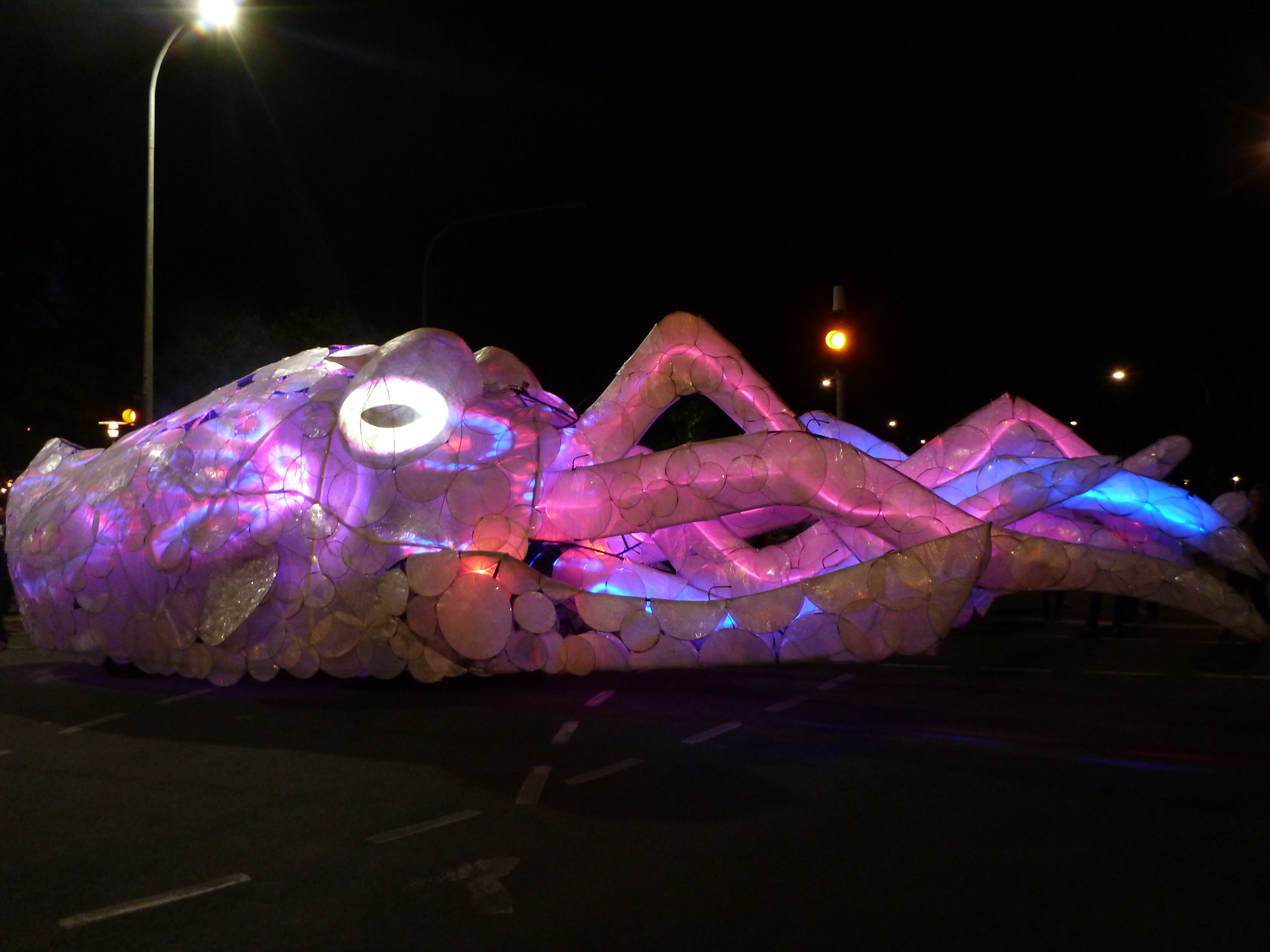
Disco Cuttlefish at 2014 Adelaide Fringe

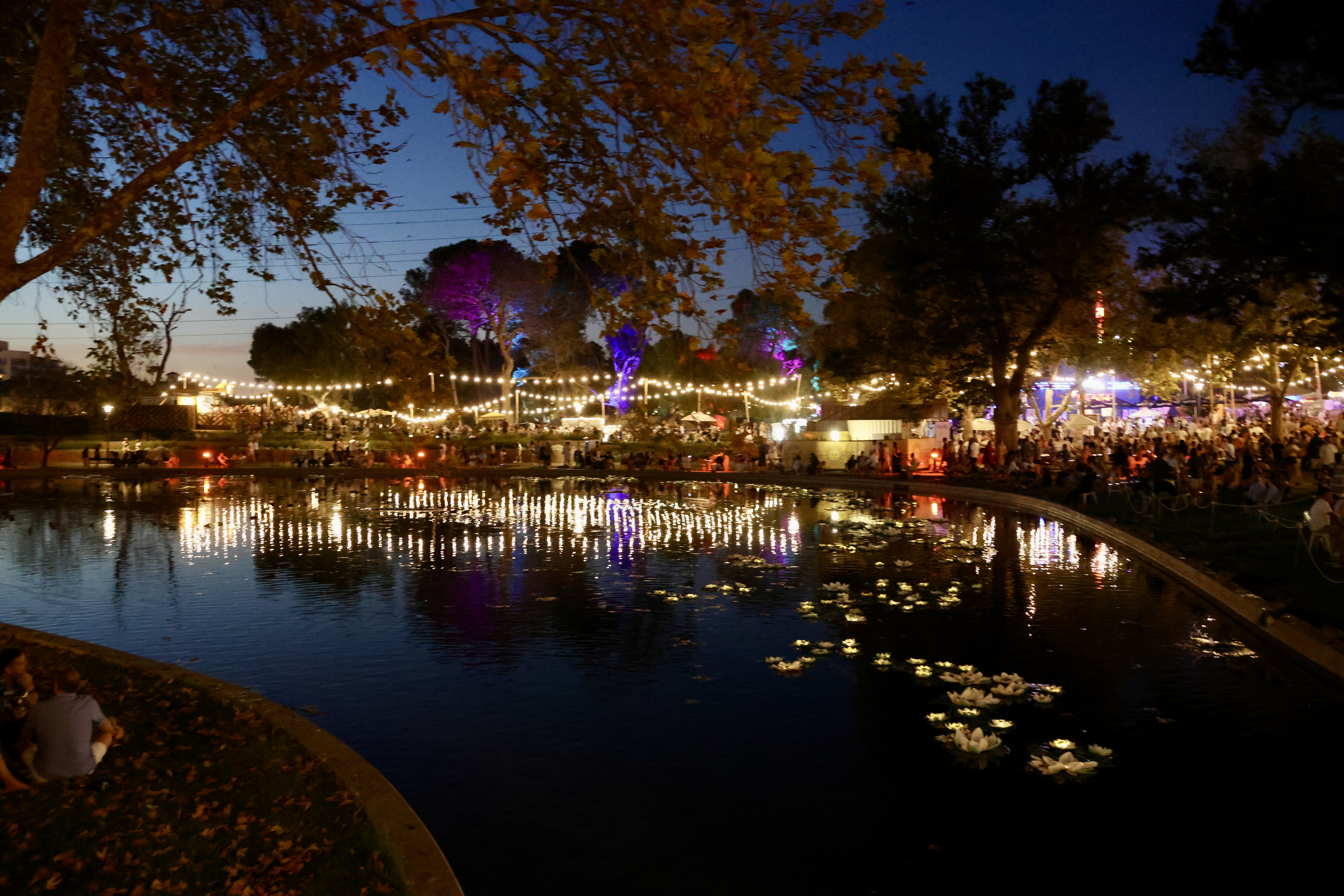
Gluttony at night, 2025 Adelaide Fringe

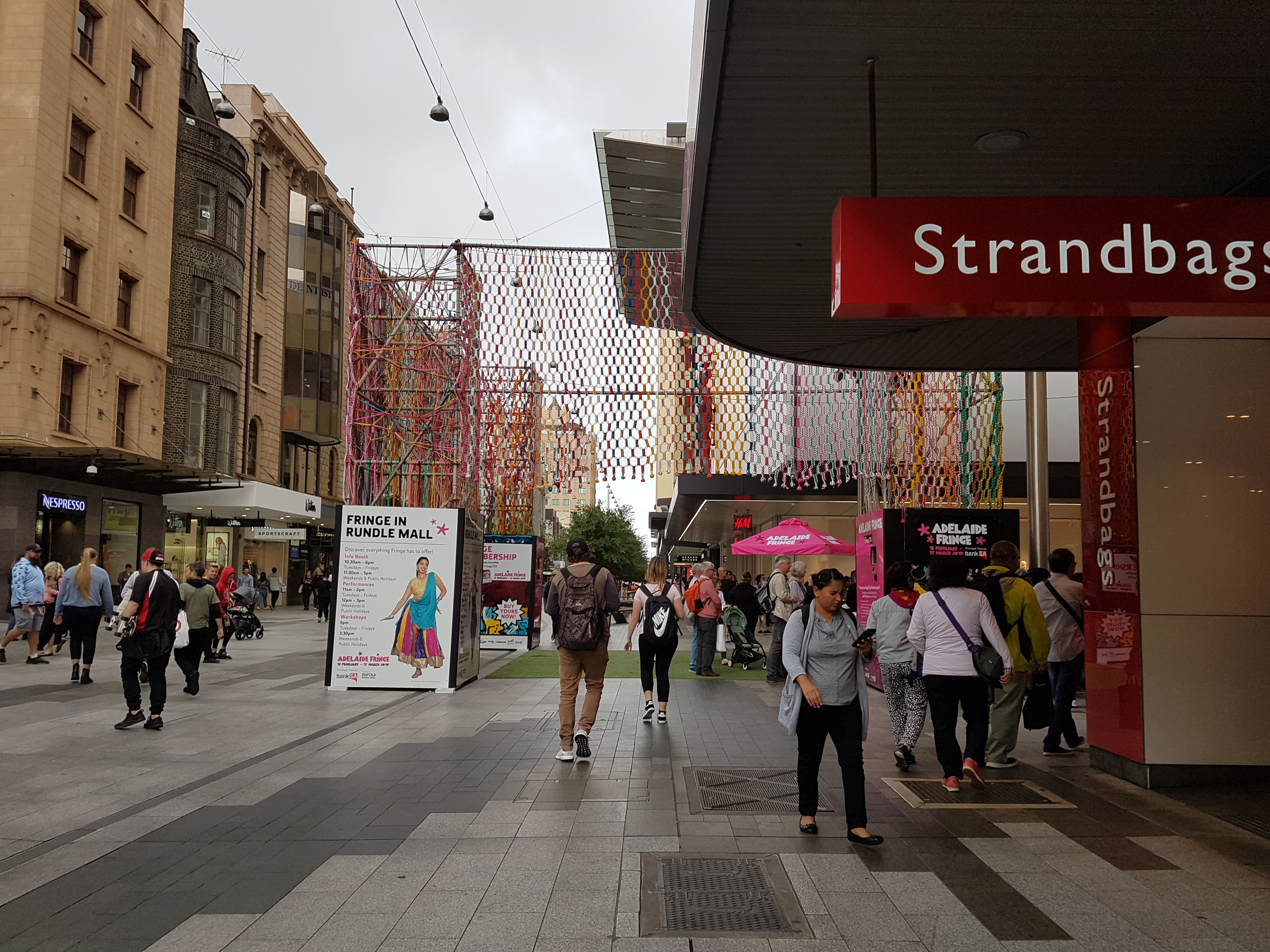
Adelaide Fringe advertising in Rundle Mall, 2019

== Description ==
As of 2019 Adelaide Fringe is the second-largest annual arts festival in the world, after the Edinburgh Fringe, and the largest in the Southern Hemisphere, places it won in 2017, and it continues to grow each year. Artists from across the globe participate in the Fringe alongside home-grown talent, in all art forms. Adelaide Fringe also organises its own public events. The Adelaide Fringe is an open-access event, meaning that there is no curator seeking out the events which form part of the programme.

"Mad March" is a term used by locals to describe the period of five big events running concurrently in the local calendar: the Adelaide Festival of Arts (a three-week festival starting a week after the Fringe), which includes Adelaide Writers' Week and the four-day world music festival WOMADelaide, as well as the Adelaide 500 street circuit motor racing event, with accompanying its evening music concerts.

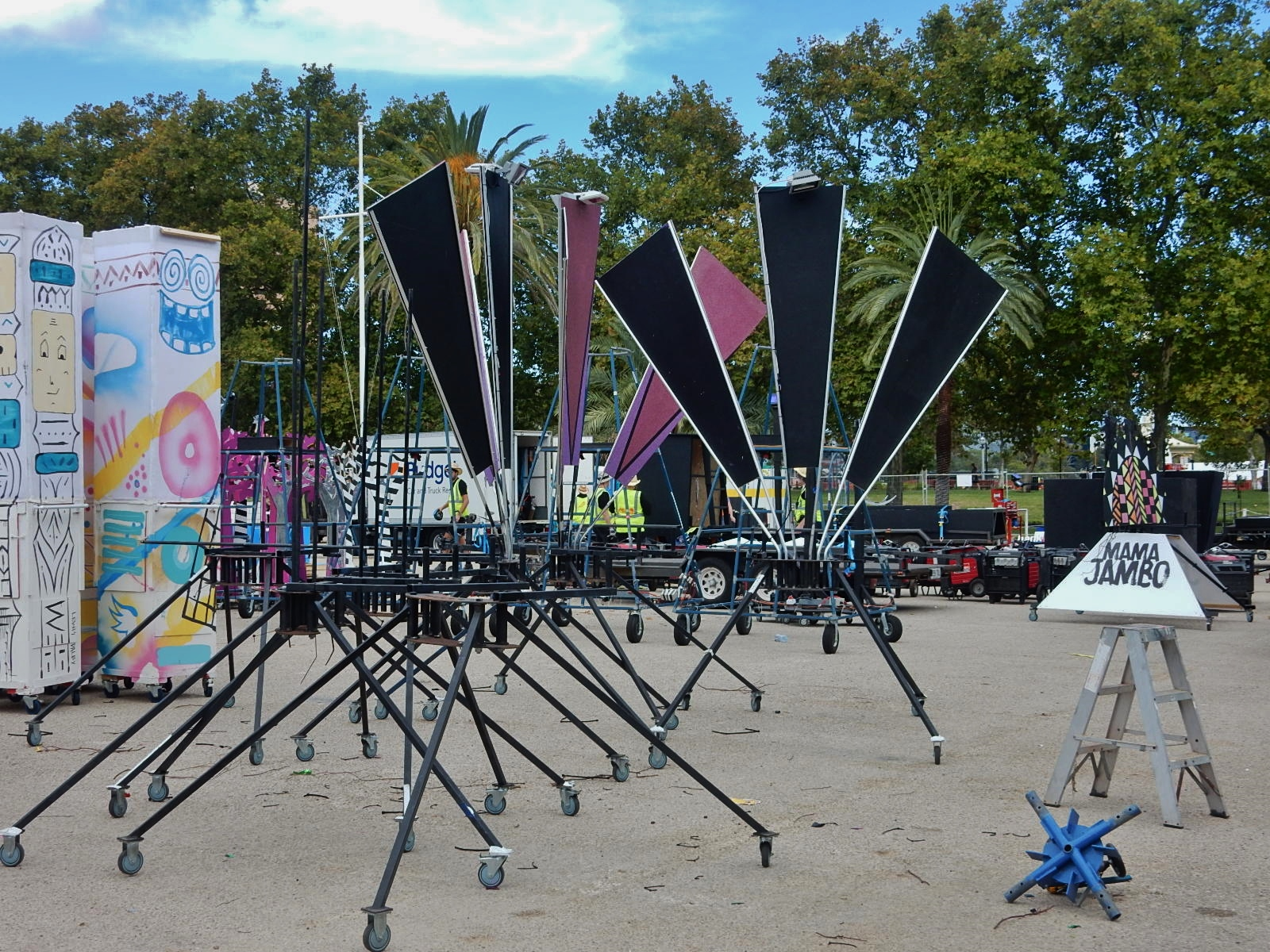
Fringe Parade props

Adelaide Fringe begins with free opening night celebrations (for many years a street parade and/or opening night party; as of 2019 an opening ceremony followed by party), and free as well as ticketed events continue for the duration of the month-long festival. The festival includes contemporary work in a wide range of art forms including cabaret, comedy, circus and physical theatre, dance, film, theatre, puppetry, music, visual art, magic, digital and interactive and design.

In 2026 the Adelaide Fringe was held from 20 February to 22 March.

== Governance and funding ==
The Adelaide Fringe and Adelaide Festival of Arts are separate organisations, with different philosophies and intent.

The Adelaide Fringe is governed by the Adelaide Fringe Board, which employs a director and CEO, a deputy director and a large team of adjunct staff to manage various aspects of the festival. A number of major contributors to the history of the Fringe were named as life members, including the founder, Frank Ford, who died in September 2018.

The principal funding partner for many years has been BankSA. Government funding has increased in recent years. The Government of South Australia is a major sponsor, through Arts South Australia from 1997 to 2018, and since then directly via the Department of the Premier and Cabinet. The City of Adelaide, The Advertiser, 9News are also among the partners of the Fringe, and corporate and private donors help to support specific initiatives for artists.

=== Directors and CEOs ===
As of January 2025, Heather Croall is the CEO and director, having been appointed in 2015.

Greg Clarke was CEO and director 2011–2014. Sandy Verschoor was CEO 2006–2010, while Christie Anthoney filled the post of director from when the Fringe went annual in 2007 to 2010; and Karen Hadfield for the 2004 and 2006 festivals.

== Venues ==
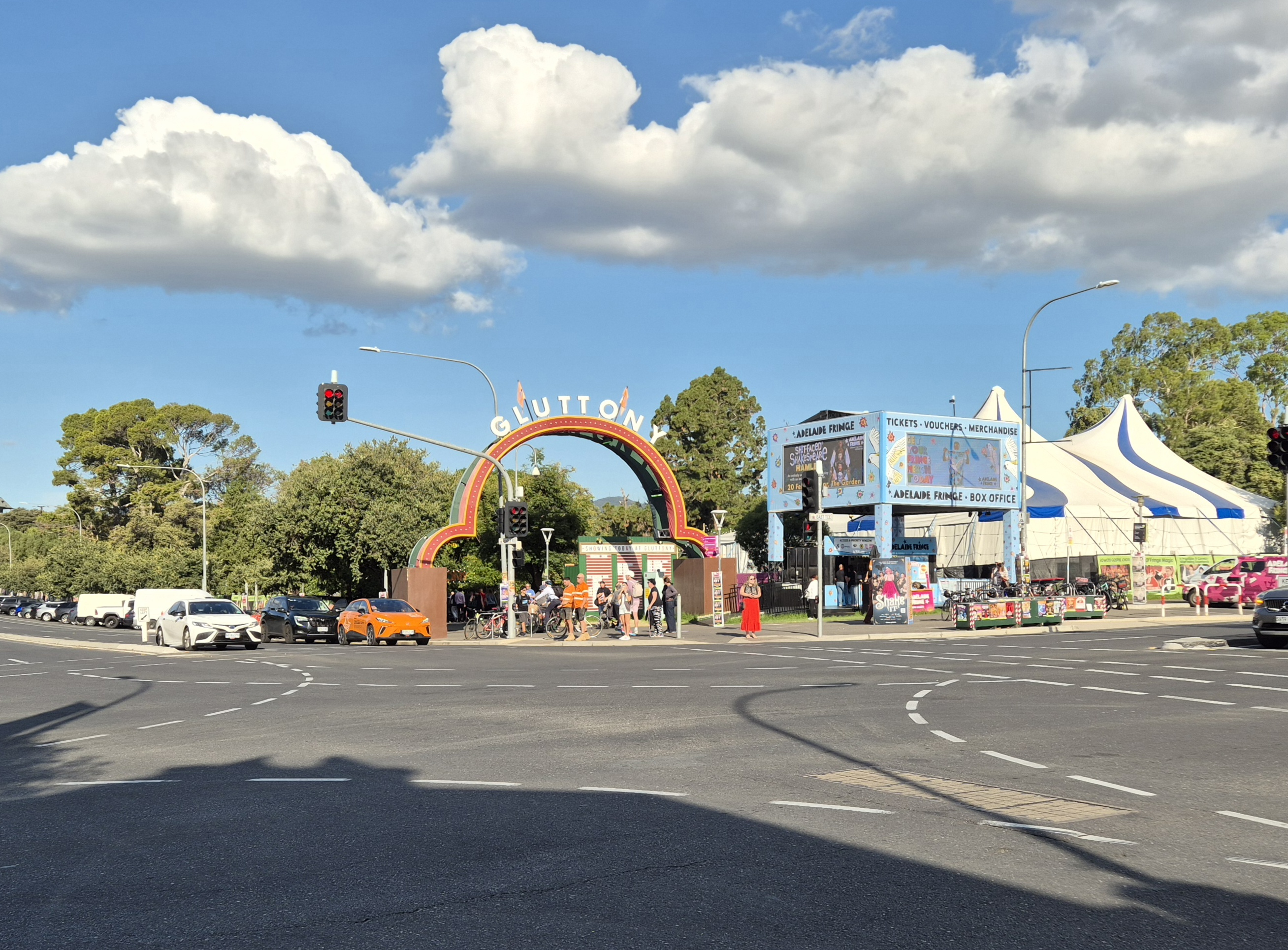
Entrance to Gluttony, 2026 Adelaide Fringe

In 2019 there were 517 venues, which included "pop-up" venues in parks, warehouses, laneways and disused buildings, as well as established venues such as theatres, hotels, bars, pubs, art galleries and cafes. Buskers regularly perform in Rundle Mall and elsewhere in and around the city as well as in the suburbs.

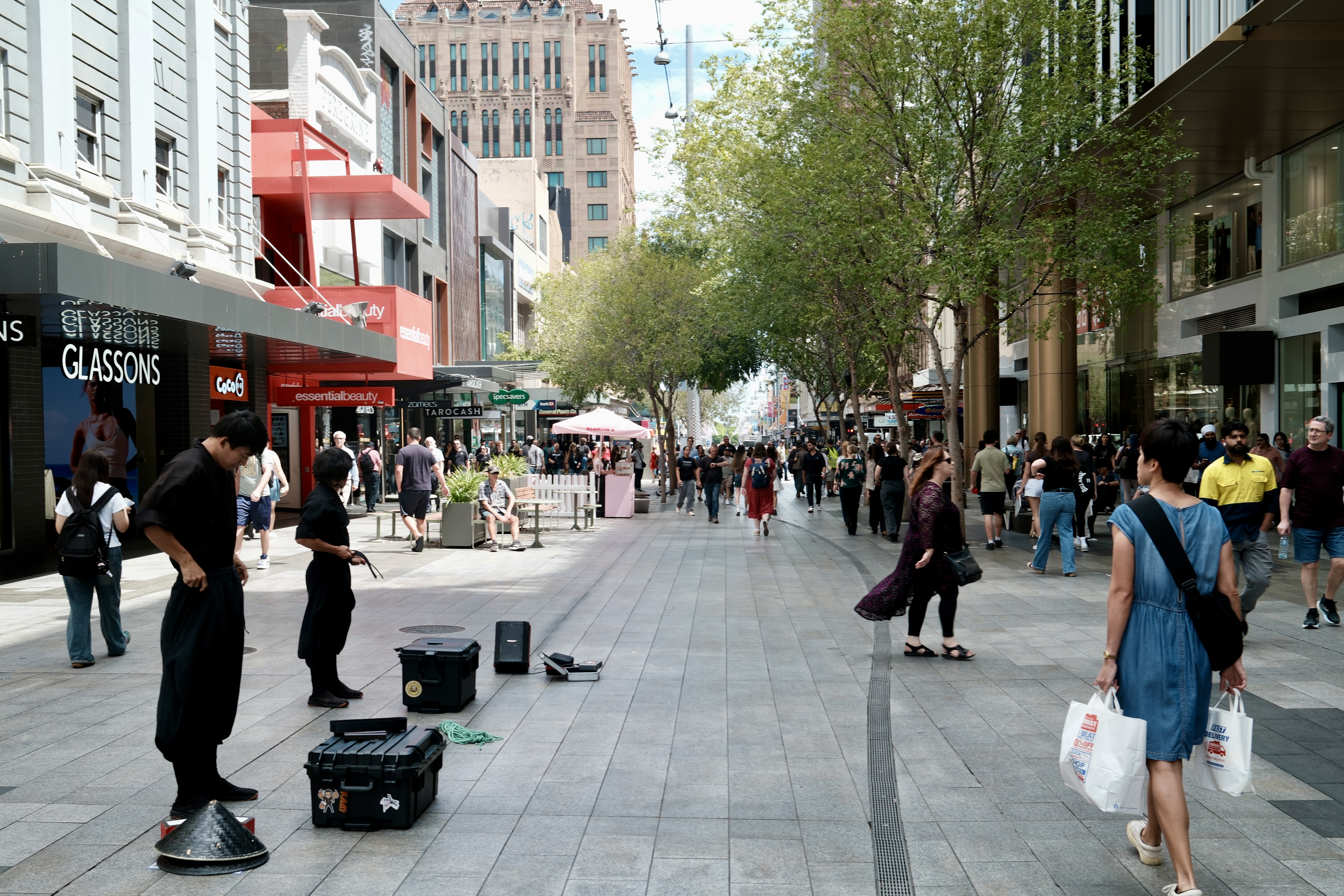
Buskers Rundle Mall, 2026 Adelaide Fringe

Accessibility has been improved in recent years, with a number of initiatives included to ensure that venues and events are able to be attended by people of all abilities.

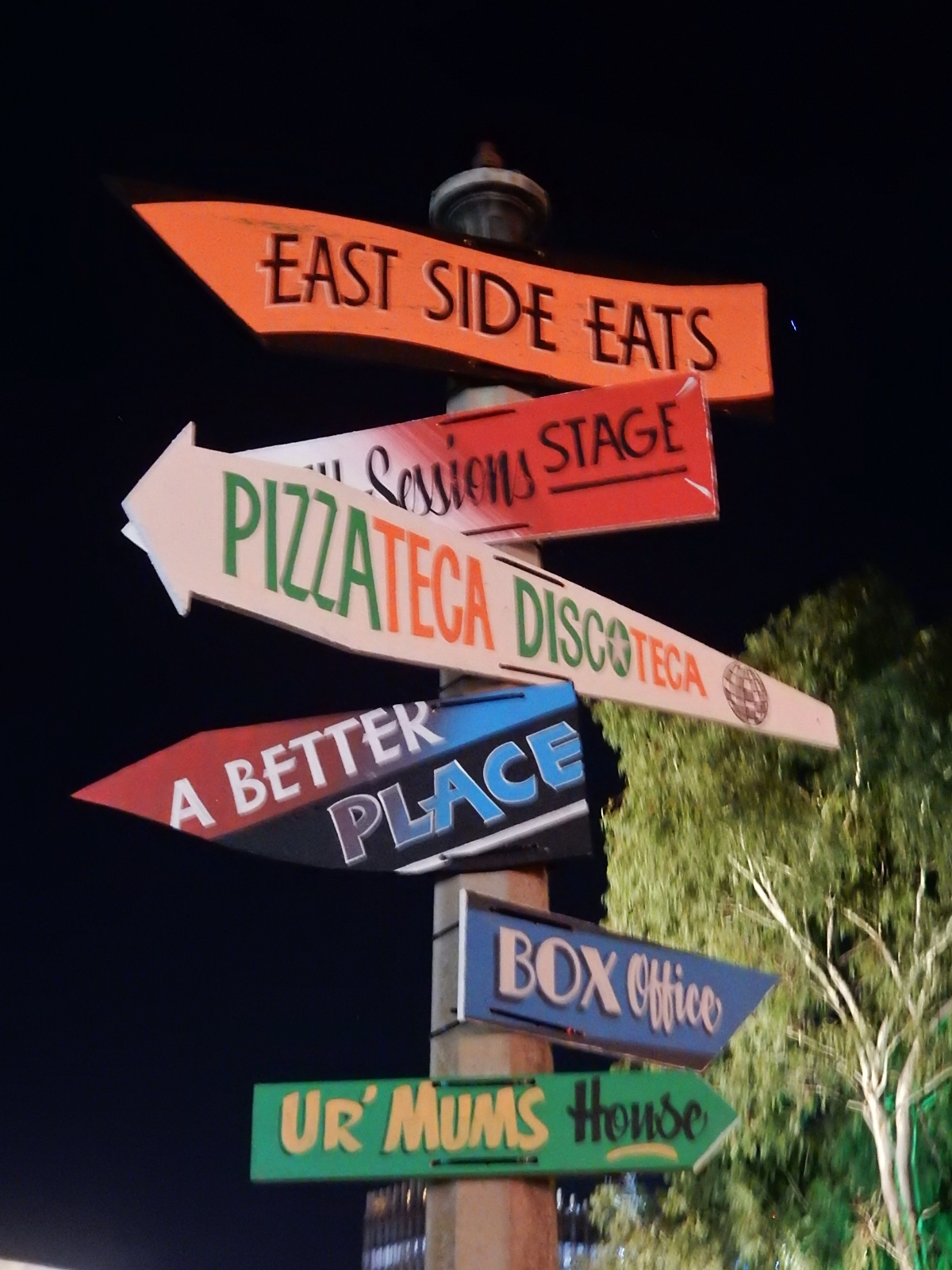
RCC Destinations

Because of Adelaide city centre's compact size, many of the venues are fairly close to each other. The city's surrounding parks provide several clusters of venues (known as venue hubs), outside of the established and converted venues within the city and suburbs. There are three main venue hubs currently:

- 2000 - present. The Garden of Unearthly Delights, the group of venues set up within a temporarily fenced area of Rundle Park / Kadlitpina, was first used in 2000, with only one Spiegeltent, known as "The Famous Spiegeltent". The Garden of Unearthly Delights had 115+ shows in 2026.
- 2010 - present. Gluttony, began in 2010, and by 2026 had 18+ venues set up within Rymill Park/Murlawirrapurka. In 2026 Gluttony had 200+ shows.
- 2023 - present. Fool's Paradise, a 4-venue hub in Adelaides city-centre at Victoria Square/Tarndanyangga
- 2014 - 2019. The Royal Croquet Club had a few changes of location since its launch in Victoria Square/Tarndanyangga in 2014, first to Pinky Flat/Tarntanya Wamain the northern parklands, then within the University of Adelaide for its final year in 2019.

Some of the permanent establishments regularly hosting Fringe events have included the Holden Street Theatres (a converted church precinct turned venue in Hindmarsh), Tandanya National Aboriginal Cultural Institute, Bakehouse Theatre (a performing arts space in the CBD), The German Club in Flinders Street, The Rhino Room (a local comedy club), the Odeon Theatre, Norwood and the National Wine Centre (a convention centre with wine bar and restaurant). Small venues make up about 50% of ticket total sales. The popular live music venue "The Gov" is used for Fringe events of all kinds.

== Adelaide Fringe Ambassadors ==
In 2012, the Government of South Australia partnered with the South Australian Tourism Commission to create the Adelaide Fringe Ambassador role to promote the Adelaide Fringe across Australia and overseas. The Adelaide Fringe Ambassador also participates in the Adelaide Fringe Opening Night Parade and performs during the Fringe.

Ambassadors
Year	Name	Performance	Ref.
2013	Paul McDermott	Paul Sings and The Dark Garden	
2014	Katie Noonan	Love Song Circus	
2015	Kitty Flanagan	Hello Kitty Flanagan	
2016	Julian Clary	The Joy of Mincing	
2017	Hugh Sheridan, James Cochran, and Adrienne Truscott	Hugh Sheridan in California Crooners Club; Adrienne Truscott in Adrienne Truscott's Asking For It and THIS; James Cochran's Street Art Explosion	
2018	Courtney Act and Joel Creasey	Courtney Act in Under The Covers; Joel Creasey in Blonde Bombshell	
2019	Judith Lucy, Gavin Wanganeen, and Hans	Judith Lucy in Judith Lucy Vs Men; Gavin Wanganeen in conversation with Holly Ransom for Fringe Talk Show; Hans in Hans Like a German	
2020	Marcia Hines, Amanda Palmer, and Fez Faanana	Marcia Hines in Velvet Rewired; Amanda Palmer in An Evening With Amanda Palmer; Fez Faanana in Black List Cabaret	
2021	Tilda Cobham-Hervey, Electric Fields, Ross Noble, Brooke Boney		
2022	Reuben Kaye, Diana Nguyen, Nazeem Hussain		
2023	Kween Kong, Sarah Millican, Penny Arcade		
2024	Adam Liaw, Prinnie Stevens, Isaac Humphries	Adam Liaw: The Cook Up with Adam Liaw LIVE; Prinnie Stevens: Lady Sings the Blues; Isaac Humphries: Unearthed	
2025	Nancy Bates, Michelle Brasier, Rhys Nicholson, and Teresa Palmer	Nancy Bates and Friends; Michelle Brasier: It's a Shame We Won't Be Friends Next Year; Rhys Nicholson: Huge Big Party Congratulations	

== History ==
=== 1960–1974: Biennial, 2–3 weeks, status unclear ===
The first "fringe" event came about in 1960, when a few artists decided to stage their own events in response to the exclusion of many local and smaller-scale artists from the curated Adelaide Festival of Arts. Fringe activities consisted of local visual arts, crafts, performing arts and amateur theatre groups organising productions, exhibitions and events alongside the Festival and running for two weeks. According to Fringe Vault, "These events that have been called 'unofficial fringe activities' formed the beginnings of the 'Fringe'. These were seen as separate to any 'unofficial activity supported by the festival' which were listed in the 1960 Festival of Arts Festival Souvenir Programme under Festival Attractions, other Events and other Exhibitions".

In 1962, the number of unofficial local events and exhibitions grew to the point where, according to a thesis by Martin Christmas, "1962 appears to have been the Festival where it was recognised that 'ancillary' (fringe activities), were as important as the core cultural activities", and Max Harris wrote an article entitled Adelaide's Two Festivals.

In 1964, Fringe was host to 52 art exhibitions, collections and performances. Like the Festival of Arts, it was held biennially, for three weeks. Both approved and unapproved events had grown in number. Significant productions of two Patrick White plays, The Ham Funeral and Night on Bald Mountain, staged by local performers in 1961 and 1964 respectively after being refused by the main Festival, served to cement the status of what started being referred to in the press as "Fringe" events.

In 1970, the event grew to three weeks in duration, running from 6–28 March that year and experiencing significant growth in both official and unofficial events and including three major musical performances, four dance performances, an opera, film events and exhibitions.

The first printed souvenir programme was published for the 1974 event, with the title as "Adelaide Festival of Arts, March 9 to 30: Fringe programme". However, there were still a large number of unofficial events: the programme listed 41 exhibitions listed and 20 performances; unofficial events included 50 exhibitions, 10 performances and many other events.

=== 1976–2006: Biennial, 3 weeks, established ===
==== 1976: Focus ====
In 1975 the fringe became an incorporated association, and thus "legal", with writer and director Frank Ford as its founding chairman. Its name was Focus Inc., with the focus on the development of South Australian culture. The change of name caused some controversy at the time, but the reason was reinforce the notion that Focus was not a cultural cringe. The first independently organised Fringe, known as Focus Festival, came into being and was seen as a huge success. This was the true beginning of today's Adelaide Fringe, as a separate entity and with focused goals, and the first dedicated poster, proclaiming "Focus '76". The 1978 poster said: "Focus: Adelaide's Festival of the Australian Arts".

==== 1982: Adelaide Festival Fringe ====
In 1982, the name on the poster, with a design by Pro Hart, changed to Adelaide Festival Fringe. In that year there were 50 venues, 86 groups or individual artists, as well as 56 visual arts exhibitions in the city venues. There were also 16 groups doing performances in schools and public spaces. In 1988 the festival opened its doors to international artists, and the early 1990s brought further big changes, creating the most successful festival yet. It was beginning to put itself on the map internationally. The brochures stated that it was "the biggest community arts festival in Australia" and "ranked second only, behind the internationally renowned Edinburgh Festival Fringe". The inaugural Opening Night Hindley Street Party was thrown, and patron Don Dunstan called on the state government to provide more funding.

==== 1992-4: Adelaide Fringe Festival ====
In 1994, the name on the posters changed from Adelaide Festival Fringe to Adelaide Fringe Festival, as a result of changes brought about in 1992–3. It decided to adopt the name Adelaide Fringe and to broaden the role of the organisation. Dubbed "the affordable festival", the 1992 festival was the most successful in its 32-year history, with many of the events taking place in the newly completed Lion Arts Centre on the western end of North Terrace. The 1994 poster showed "Adelaide Fringe Festival", in contrast to the recent past "Adelaide Festival Fringe".

In 1998, the used its own especially developed ticketing system, FringeTix, for the first time.

==== 2000: Adelaide Fringe ====
The 2000 Fringe dropped the "Festival" and started calling itself the Adelaide Fringe. That year was dedicated to former state premier and fringe patron Don Dunstan, embracing his vision of social justice and cultural diversity that continues to be an inspiration today.

In 2006 South Australian Premier Mike Rann announced that the Adelaide Fringe would receive extra government funding (totalling $2 million) to enable it to become an annual event from 2007 onwards.

=== 2007–2012: Annual, 3 weeks ===
In 2007, the Adelaide Fringe became an annual event, after receiving funding from the state government of A$500,000, which was deemed a success. In 2007, 130,000 tickets were sold through the FringeTIX box office system – with an additional 10,000 ticket sales by national ticketing partners.

In 2008, about 187,000 tickets were sold through the FringeTIX box office and their ticketing partners. 281 Fringe venues sold tens of thousands of tickets on the door. Family Day became Family Weekend and doubled in size and attendances. The final box office income was estimated to reach over A$5.3 million, the majority of which was passed back to Fringe artists.

In 2009, pre-event ticket sales equalled that of the previous year. 2,800 artists featured in 250 venues across the city, in 508 comedy, theatre, music, dance and visual art shows.

The Adelaide Fringe celebrated its 50th anniversary in 2010. Compared to the previous year ticket sales were 27% higher. For the first time, Fringe sold 100,000 tickets prior to the opening parade. The event received extra State Government funding of A$350,000 to support the anniversary event. The grant covered the cost of producing eight inflatable astronauts and erecting them around the city. 300,000 tickets were sold at box offices, more than twice as many as were sold in 2007.

In 2011, the Fringe Parade was cancelled due to rain, but 334,000 tickets were sold, equating to over A$8 million. 1.45 million attendances were recorded and ticket sales had increased 11% over the previous year.

The 2012 festival ran from 24 February to 18 March. Approximately 40,000 spectators attended the Fringe Parade, and 367,000 tickets were sold, a 10% increase on 2011 sales. Ticket sales equated to an approximate value of A$9 million. The event featured over 4,000 artists and 923 events, in 300 venues. There were 20% more events than in 2011. CEO Greg Clarke launched the event not only in Adelaide, but also at the Sydney Opera House and in Federation Square in Melbourne. There were also two big changes on opening night: the parade ran down the centre of the city along King William Street, and the celebrations before, during and afterwards were not just in the East End of the city centre, but in Fringe venues everywhere. There were also a number of large free outdoor events during the festival.

=== 2013–2020: Annual, 4 weeks ===
In 2013, after a boost in government funding, Fringe was extended to run for a 4-week period, commencing Friday 15 February. There were over 4,000 artists registered, appearing in 930 events and 6139 performances, and 407,153 tickets were sold. The dollar value of ticket sales equated to A$11.6 million. The event generated A$64.6 million, which was an increase of 34% on the previous year.

In 2014, the festival ran for 30 days and nights from 14 February until 16 March, and brought together over 4,000 artists from around Australia and the world. Over 900 events were staged in pop-up venues in parks, warehouses, lane-ways and disused buildings as well as established venues such as theatres, hotels, art galleries and cafes.

==== Heather Croall, 2015–present ====
In February 2015, Heather Croall came on board as CEO and Festival Director. More than A$13 million worth of tickets were sold, made up of more than 536,000 tickets sold across 376 venues, resulting in an increase of 20% compared to the previous year.

Ticket sales for the 2016 Adelaide Fringe Festival rose 12% on the previous year, with more than 600,000 tickets sold. More than 1,100 performances were staged across 430 venues. British comedian Alexis Dubus vowed not to perform in future Adelaide Fringe Festivals, citing his reason as the festival being driven by larger venues, which attract crowds who buy drinks instead of show tickets, leading to poor ticket sales and cancellations for shows. (However, he returned to the Adelaide Fringe Festival in 2018.)

In April 2016, the "Made in Adelaide" initiative was announced by the state government, which provided funds totalling A$55,000 to support nine acts taking their work to the Edinburgh Fringe, to help build connections between the two festivals. In August 2016, the Fringe began an official partnership with the Edinburgh Fringe Festival. Among the acts was a live audio drama of Matthew Reilly's 1998 book Ice Station.

In November 2016, CEO Croall spoke of the need for better marketing to attract more tourists, and ways to help ensure that artists received a decent share of income.

The start date of the 2017 festival was postponed by a week to 17 February, with the March long weekend falling on weekend four of the festival, instead of the last weekend. It was in 2017 that it became the largest arts festival in the Southern Hemisphere, and the second largest Fringe in the world.

Adelaide Fringe 2018 once again broke all records, attracting 2.7 million people in attendance across free and ticketed events, including 100,000 for the Opening Night Street Party (which replaced the opening night Parade) and 505,000 for the Parade of Light digital projections onto the buildings along North Terrace on every night of the 31-day festival. More than 6,900 artists performed in 1,231 events across 442 venues. Box office revenue reached A$16.6 million from 705,761 tickets sold (up 7 per cent). The event also saw a greater share going into artists' pockets, after A$1 million of funding from the state government enabled the Fringe to abolish inside charges for artists with tickets under $35, and to halve those for all others. The move was praised by artists, including Dubus, who returned with a new show that year.

Records were again broken in 2019, with attendance by tourists increased by 72% on the previous year (possibly a consequence of increased interstate marketing), a total of nearly 3.3 million attendances, and A$95 million in estimated expenditure. 7000 artists participated in 1326 events. The reach of Fringe has been pushing further out of the boundaries of Adelaide, into regional centres.

==== 2020: 60th anniversary ====
The Fringe celebrated its 60th anniversary in 2020. While the 2020 Fringe was the first in years to see a decrease in the number of registered events ("over 1200", compared with 1320 in 2019), the events were more widely spread, with half of the venues outside Adelaide city centre, including both suburban and regional locations such as Stirling, Gawler and Murray Bridge.

The World Fringe Congress, first held in 2012, was held in Adelaide for the first time in 2020.

The last weekend of the festival was somewhat impacted by the COVID-19 pandemic in Australia, although government rules on social distancing and travel did not start until the following week. Nonetheless, it brought in a record $96.7 million in estimated gross economic expenditure, with box office revenue also hitting a record $21 million, selling 853,419 tickets.

==== 2021 ====
Dates were announced for the 2021 Fringe (19 February – 21 March), but future planning was hampered by uncertainty caused by the global pandemic and consequent greater financial risk to performers and venues. However, the festival did go ahead, with 40,000 tickets sold by 18 February 2021. It proved to be the largest arts festival in the world in both 2020 and 2021, with South Australia not as badly affected as many places by the pandemic.

== Notable mascots ==
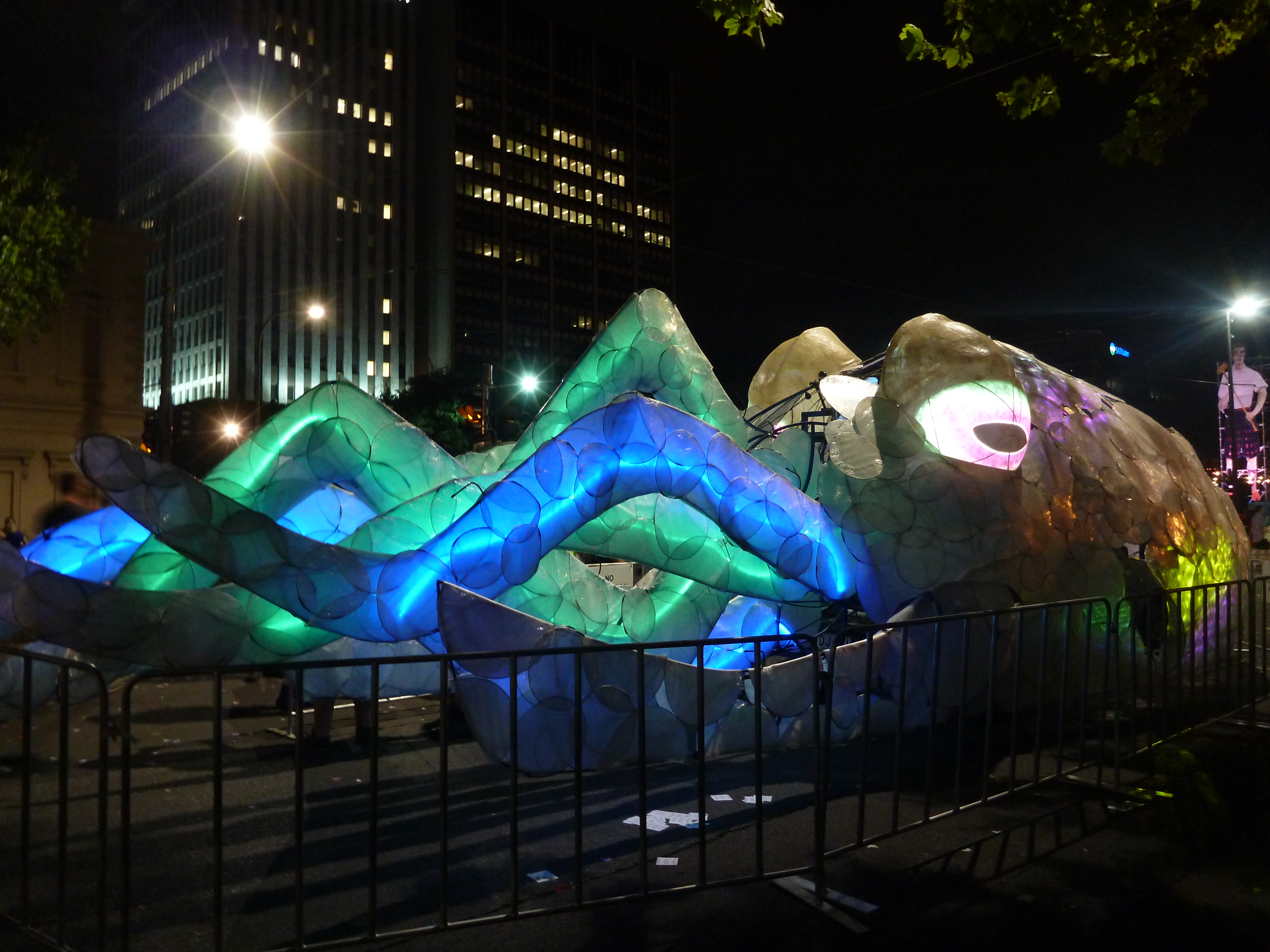
Adelaide Fringe's 2014 mascot, Stobie the Disco Cuttlefish, after the opening parade, February 14.

In 2010, eight giant 10–12-metre (33–39 ft)-high inflatable astronauts, created by Mr Inflatables, were placed around Adelaide.

The 2014 event's mascot was Stobie the Disco Cuttlefish, a 13-metre (43 ft)-long street performance puppet inspired by the giant cuttlefish of South Australia. Stobie the Disco Cuttlefish flashed multi-coloured lights, waved its tentacles and played pre-recorded disco music while a group of professional dancers performed original choreography each Saturday night during the event.

The 2018 mascot was inspired by the winning poster of that year, featuring a multi-coloured dog made of balloons, with a crown, created by Sydney graphic designer Jacqueline Daniel. It was intended to celebrate the Chinese Year of the Dog.

== Made in Adelaide Award ==
The Made in Adelaide Award was introduced in 2017 by Arts South Australia, as part of the "Made In Adelaide" campaign started in 2016, to export and promote South Australian artists at the Edinburgh Fringe. Entries are open to artists in the Adelaide Fringe who are planning to register with the 2017 Edinburgh Fringe. The Award is worth A$10,000 as of 2019.

Winners:

- 2017: Joanne Hartstone – The Girl Who Jumped Off the Hollywood Sign
- 2018: Anya Anastasia – The Executioners
- 2019: Michelle Pearson – Just Desserts – Adults Only Tasting
- 2020: Erin Fowler - Femme

== Poster competition ==
Since 2007, the Adelaide Fringe holds an annual competition to select the cover art for the festival's guide, website, posters and general branding. Previous winners include:

- 2007 – Ryan Stephens
- 2008 – Hat Morgan
- 2009 – David Blaiklock
- 2010 – David Capriotti
- 2011 – Kamen Goranov
- 2012 – Sue Ninham
- 2013 – Andy Petrusevics
- 2014 – Sharon Moreno
- 2015 – Jonathon Oxlade and Chris Moore
- 2016 – Stephanie Mitchell
- 2017 – Jennifer Rimbault
- 2018 – Jacqueline Daniel
- 2019 – Matthew Clarke
- 2020 – Dave Court

== See also ==
- FUSE Festival
- List of festivals in Australia
- Music of Adelaide
