= All About Me (disambiguation) =

All About Me is a 2000s British television sitcom.

All About Me may also refer to:

- All About Me (film), 2018 German film
- "All About Me" (Hugh Sheridan song), 2009
- "All About Me" (Syd song), 2017
- All About Me, an album by Cleo Laine, 1962
- All About Me, an album by Madd Hatta, 1995
- All About Me, an EP by Natti Natasha, 2012
- All About Me, a 2010 Broadway musical revue featuring Dame Edna and Michael Feinstein
- All About Me!: My Remarkable Life in Show Business, a 2021 memoir by Mel Brooks
