= Stephen Mahy =

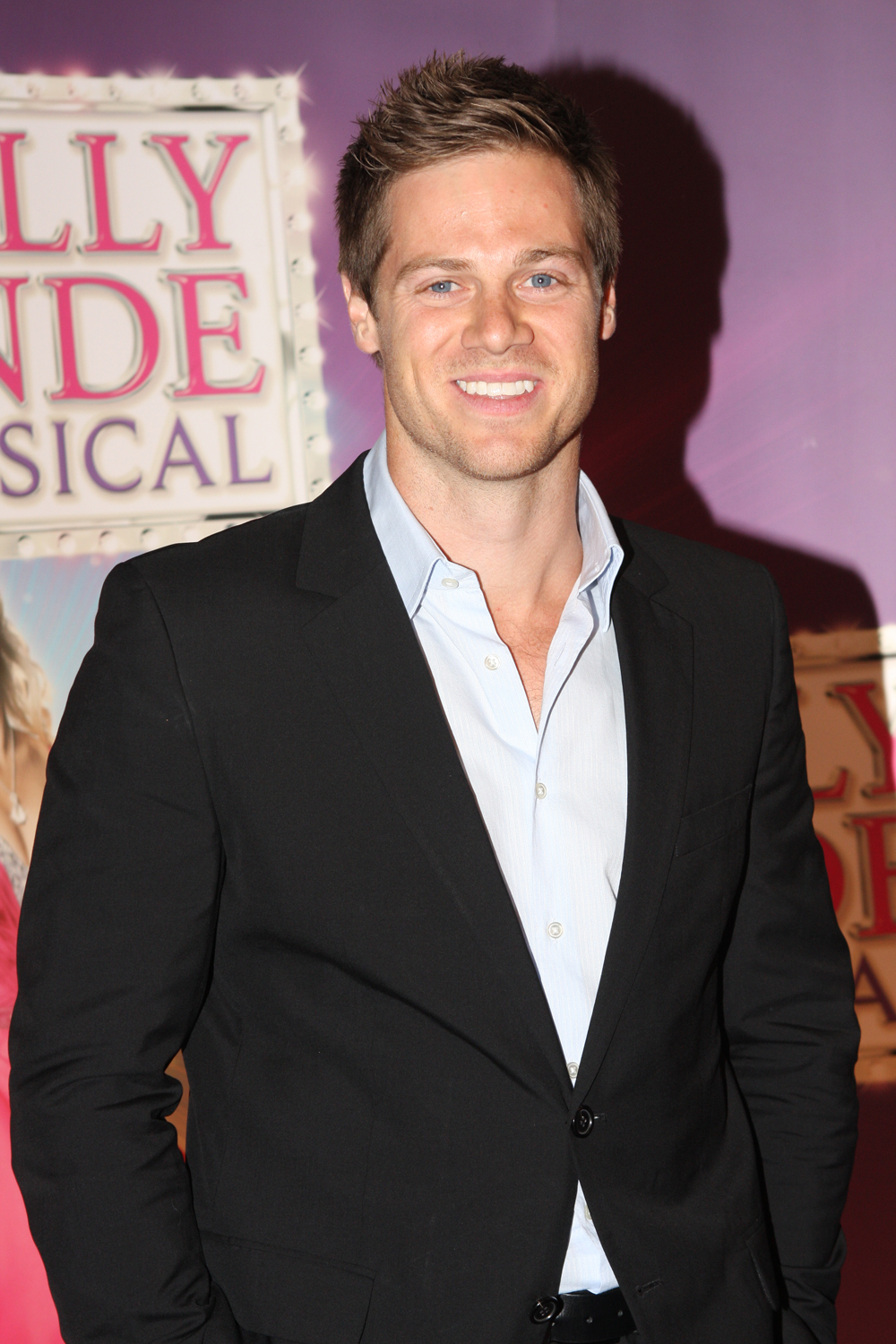
- Stephen Mahy at the opening of Legally Blonde, 2012

Background information
- Born: 27 July 1982 (age 44); Sydney, Australia
- Genre: Musical theatre
- Occupations: Singer, actor
- Years active: 2006–present
- Website: www.stephenmahy.com

Stephen Mahy is an Australian born tenor from Sydney, NSW, best known for originating the role of Bob Gaudio in the Australian production of Jersey Boys. After graduating from the Western Australian Academy of Performing Arts in 2006, Stephen toured the country in Miss Saigon, covering the lead role of Chris and playing the role to every audience in the country. Mahy toured nationally in Grease, playing the role of Kenickie alongside notable cast members Rob Mills, Gretel Scarlett, Anthony Callea, Lucy Maunder, Todd McKenney and Bert Newton as Vince Fontaine. In 2015, Stephen joined the cast of The Rocky Horror Show, playing the role of Brad Majors alongside Craig McLachlan, Amy Lehpamer, Jayde Westaby, Bert Newton and Richard O'Brien, just to name a few. He featured in "Stephen Schwartz in Conversation" at Sydney's Theatre Royal, where he performed on stage for the noted composer.

== Biography ==
Mahy graduated from the Western Australian Academy of Performing Arts with a Bachelor in Music Theatre in 2006.

He counts Australian theatre performers Anthony Warlow and Hugh Jackman as influences and, as of 2012, hopes to release an album in a similar vein to Warlow's Best of Act 1.

== Early career ==
Mahy's first appearance on television was at 16 in Rampant, a skateboarding program.

While at the Western Australian Academy of Performing Arts, Mahy appeared in numerous productions, including Bobbin Up, Crazy For You and Elegies.

== Theatre ==
- Mahy was cast in the ensemble of Miss Saigon, which opened at the Lyric Theatre, NSW, in September 2007 understudying the role of Chris for David Harris.
- In The Production Company's 2008 production of Follies, at State Theatre, Melbourne, Mahy played the role of Young Ben.
- In September 2008, Mahy appeared in Karaoke: The Musical, written by Guy Noble.
- Mahy played the role of Laurie Laurence in the Kookaburra production of Little Women.
- In November 2011, Mahy appeared at Sydney's Sidetrack Theatre in Transport.
- Mahy originated the role of Bob Gaudio in the Australian production of Jersey Boys, remaining with the show for its Melbourne and Sydney run.
- In 2012, Mahy played Hugh Hansen in Spank! The Fifty Shades Parody in Brisbane.
- Mahy was cast opposite Lucy Maunder (Rizzo) as Kenickie in the 2013 Australian revival of Grease in Brisbane, Sydney and Melbourne. He was given the role of Danny Zuko (opposite Gretel Scarlet as Sandy) for the Singapore leg of the tour from 25 April 2014. Grease returned to Australia in June, with Mahy returning to the role of Kenickie, for Perth and Adelaide performances and then an encore season is planned for Melbourne in December.
- Mahy guest starred in the theatrical production Great Detectives of Old Time Radio Live in Sydney during September 2016.
- Mahy joined the cast of Saturday Night Fever: The Musical in 2019.
- Mahy played Lord Savage in the 25th anniversary concert of Jekyll & Hyde.

== Concert ==
He performed a one-man show called Stephen Mahy Sings at Slide in Sydney on 16 March 2012.

He sang "Pretty Lady" with Michael Falzon and Shaun Rennie, as well as "Marry Me a Little" and "Barcelona" with Helen Dallimore at the gala performance of Side By Side By Sondheim for Enda Markey Presents. The trio of Falzon, Rennie, and Mahy reprised "Pretty Lady" for Light The Night 2012, an annual charity concert raising funds for bone marrow research in honour of Rennie's brother Matthew.

Mahy performed at the Seniors' Week On Broadway concert in 2012 with Ian Stenlake (Oklahoma, Guys and Dolls), Lucy Durack (Wicked, 42nd Street), Kate Maree Hoolihan (Little Women, We Will Rock You) and Debra Byrne.

In March 2013, Mahy performed at Pants Off!, a benefit concert supporting the charity Beyond Blue. He sang Let It Be by The Beatles.

== Other performances ==
=== Television ===
- I Will Survive (reality television contest). He was eliminated in round eight. His final song was "Rehab" by Amy Winehouse.
- St.George Bank commercial
- Appeared in Out of the Blue as Constable Wyatt in 2008
- Played Andrew Ryde in City Homicide ("In Harm's Way"), series 4, episode 8

=== Audio dramas ===
- Mahy appeared as Brian Weir in The Phoenix Files audio dramas. The series' first two volumes were released across 2017 and 2018. The final volume was released in November 2018.

== Recordings ==
- "Greased Lightnin'" on Grease Cast Album
