= Hugh Sheridan =

Australian actor & singer (born 1985)

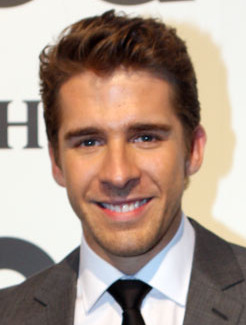
- Sheridan at the 2011 GQ Men of the Year Awards
- Born: 30 June 1985 (age 41); Adelaide, South Australia, Australia
- Education: National Institute of Dramatic Art (BFA)
- Occupations: Actor, singer, television presenter
- Years active: 2008–present
- Spouse: Rafael de la Fuente (m. 2009; div. 2018)

Hugh Sheridan (born 30 June 1985) is an Australian actor, singer, and television presenter who is known for his (Note: Sheridan uses both "he/him" and "they/them" pronouns. This article uses "he/him" for consistency.) role as Ben Rafter in the television series Packed to the Rafters. Sheridan is a four-time Logie Award winner, in the Most Popular Actor category.

== Early life and education ==
Sheridan grew up in the Adelaide suburb of Millswood. His father, Denis Sheridan, was a jazz musician, and was mayor of Unley from 1982 to 1985, and his mother, Margaret, and all seven children in the family were active in the community. Hugh attended Loreto College in Marryatville for the junior primary years, before changing to Saint Ignatius' College.

He began training at Unley Youth Theatre aged 5, later (2010) becoming patron of the then renamed Urban Youth.

From the age of 16 studied advanced dance at the Terry Simpson Studios in Adelaide, where his teacher recommended that he audition at the Australian Ballet School, where he was accepted and studied for two years. While studying dance there, he also studied opera at the Victorian College of the Arts.

Upon leaving the Australian Ballet School, Sheridan was accepted into the Bachelor of Dramatic Art course at the National Institute of Dramatic Art in Sydney, aged 18. In his final year there, he won the role of Ben Rafter in the pilot for Packed to the Rafters.

== Career ==
=== 2008-2013: Packed to the Rafters ===
Sheridan performed in The Lost Echo with the Sydney Theatre Company, and was then hired for the Seven Network series Packed to the Rafters as Ben Rafter. At the Logie Awards of 2009 he won the Logie Award for Most Popular New Male Talent and was nominated for the Logie Award for Most Outstanding Newcomer and the Logie Award for Most Outstanding Newcomer. In 2010, he won the Logie Award for Most Popular Actor for his role. The following year, he won the award again and was nominated for the Logie Award for Most Outstanding Actor. In 2011 and 2012, as part of the cast, he was also nominated by the Equity Ensemble Awards for Outstanding Performance by an Ensemble Series in a Drama Series. He won the Most Popular Actor award for a third time at the Logie Awards of 2012, and was nominated for the award in 2013 and 2014.

In 2010, he performed in the musical, Newley Discovered at The Theater Center in New York City. The musical celebrated the life of British singer-songwriter, Anthony Newley.

In February 2011, he filled in as host on The Kyle & Jackie O Show alongside fellow Packed to the Rafters star George Houvardas. In 2012, Sheridan hosted the Network Ten talent show series I Will Survive, during a production break for Packed to the Rafters.

=== 2014-2017: INXS, The Divorce, House Husbands ===
In 2014 starred as Garry Gary Beers, INXS guitarist in the Seven Network miniseries, INXS: Never Tear Us Apart.

In 2015, he starred as Toby, an aspiring artist in the ABC TV miniseries, The Divorce.

In 2017, he joined the main cast of the fifth season of Nine Network's, House Husbands. He played Nick Gazecki and starred alongside Delta Goodrem.

=== 2018-present: Five Bedrooms, Back to the Rafters ===
In 2019, he began starring as real estate agent, Lachlan Best, alongside Kat Stewart and Steve Peacocke in the Network 10 comedy-drama series, Five Bedrooms. He starred in the first two seasons and returned for the fourth and final season in 2023.

In 2019, he appeared in the Australian horror anthology film, Dark Place, which was screened at the Melbourne International Film Festival. The following year, he was cast in the Australian production of Hedwig and the Angry Inch. The production was postponed after a petition highlighted the lack of LGBTQ representation in the show and expressed "disappointment" over the casting of Sheridan in the lead role of Hedwig, whom many believe to be a transgender character. The American creators of Hedwig, John Cameron Mitchell and Stephen Trask, issued a statement saying they did not believe that Hedwig was transgender, and that anyone could play the role, however, the Australian producers, Showtune Productions, cancelled the show.

In 2021, he reunited with the Packed to the Rafters cast for Back to the Rafters on Amazon Prime Video. At the Logie Awards of 2022, he was nominated for the Logie Award for Most Outstanding Supporting Actor.

In March 2021, Sheridan debuted his stage show Hughman at Adelaide Fringe.

In 2022, Sheridan was revealed to be Rooster when he placed third in Season 4 of The Masked Singer Australia.

In 2023, Sheridan performed the lead role of Jonathan Larson in Tick, Tick...Boom! in Melbourne, Brisbane, and Sydney.

== Music ==
In 2009 he released the album Speak Love, which peaked at no. 86 on the Australian charts. He has also released the singles "Just Can't Throw Us Away", "All About Me", and "Speak Love".

Sometime before 2015 Sheridan and friends Emile Welman and Gabe Roland formed the singing trio California Crooners Club, after sharing their love of jazz music in Hollywood. The California Crooners Club, based in Los Angeles, has performed at the Adelaide Fringe (2015, 2019, 2020) to good reviews, with six shows sold out before their first appearance. In 2015 they were also booked for Melbourne and Sydney. They performed in a Spiegeltent at the Brisbane Festival in 2016 and 2018.

== Other roles ==
In 2010 Sheridan became patron of Urban Myth Theatre of Youth.

In 2017, he was appointed as one of three Fringe Ambassadors for the Adelaide Fringe.

== Personal life ==
Sheridan came out as non-binary and bisexual in an Instagram post on 26 June 2021, In an October 2020 interview with Stellar, Sheridan revealed relationships with both women and men but preferred not to label his sexuality. Later, in a September 2024 interview on The Kyle and Jackie O Show, Sheridan claimed that he never came out as non-binary and he had been "too scared" to correct people. He also said that he was straight "for now".

He was married to Venezuelan actor Rafael de la Fuente from 2009 to 2018. On 5 March 2021, Sheridan proposed to boyfriend Kurt Roberts during the opening night of the Hughman stage show; their separation was announced in November 2021.

He has been close friends with his Packed to the Rafters co-star, Jessica Marais, since they studied together at NIDA. He was previously close friends with Rebel Wilson and introduced Wilson to her wife, Ramona Agruma.

== Awards and nominations ==
Year	Award	Category	Work	Result	Ref.
2009	Logie Awards	Most Popular New Male Talent	Packed to the Rafters (Season 1)	Won	
2009	Logie Awards	Graham Kennedy Award for Most Outstanding Newcomer	Packed to the Rafters (Season 1)	Nominated	
2010	Logie Awards	Most Popular Actor	Packed to the Rafters (Season 2)	Won	
2011	Logie Awards	Most Popular Actor	Packed to the Rafters (Season 3)	Won	
2011	Logie Awards	Most Outstanding Actor	Packed to the Rafters (Season 3)	Nominated	
2011	Equity Ensemble Awards	Outstanding Performance by an Ensemble Series in a Drama Series (Note: Shared with: Michael Caton, Ryan Corr, Rebecca Gibney, George Houvardas, Gillian Jones, Jessica Marais, Angus McLaren, James Stewart, Erik Thomson, Zoe Ventoura)	Packed to the Rafters	Nominated	
2012	Logie Awards	Most Popular Actor	Packed to the Rafters (Season 4)	Won	
2012	Equity Ensemble Awards	Outstanding Performance by an Ensemble Series in a Drama Series (Note: Shared with: Michael Caton, Ryan Corr, Merridy Eastman, Rebecca Gibney, George Houvardas, Jessica Marais, Hannah Marshall, Angus McLaren, James Stewart, Erik Thomson)	Packed to the Rafters	Nominated	
2013	Logie Awards	Most Popular Actor	Packed to the Rafters (Season 5)	Nominated	
2014	Logie Awards	Most Popular Actor	Packed to the Rafters (Season 6)	Nominated	
2022	Logie Awards	Most Outstanding Supporting Actor	Back to the Rafters	Nominated	

== Filmography ==
=== Film ===
Year	Title	Role	Notes
2023	Holiday Twist	George	
2021	Christmas on the Farm	David	
2019	Dark Place	Mike	
2018	The Flip Side	Nigel	
2017	Boar	Robert	

=== Television ===
Year	Title	Role	Notes
2008–2013	Packed to the Rafters	Ben Rafter	Seasons 1–5 (main), Season 6 (guest); 103 episodes
2009–2013	Play School	Himself; presenter	
2012	I Will Survive	Himself; presenter	
2014	INXS: Never Tear Us Apart	Garry Gary Beers	2 episodes
2015	The Divorce	Toby	4 episodes
2017	House Husbands	Nick Gazecki	Season 5 (main, 12 episodes)
2019–2023	Five Bedrooms	Lachlan Best	Seasons 1–2, 4 (main, 15 episodes)
2021	Back to the Rafters	Ben Rafter	6 episodes
2022	The Masked Singer	Self/Rooster	Australian version; 7 episodes
2022	Carols in the Domain	Himself	
2022	This is Your Life: Rebecca Gibney	Himself	

== Discography ==
=== Albums ===
List of studio albums, with selected chart positions
Title	Album details	Peak chart positions
Title	Album details	AUS
Speak Love	Released: 27 November 2009; Label: Sony BMG Australia (88697606352); Format: CD, digital download	86
Something Big	Released: 20 September 2024; Label: Yo Yo Music; Format: digital download	— (Note: Something Big did not enter the ARIA Top 100 Album Chart, but peaked at number 14 on the Australian Artists Album Chart.)

== Notes ==
=== Extended plays ===
List of EPs, with selected details
Title	Details
Solitary Man	Released: 22 August 2022; Label: Solitary Man; Format: digital download

=== Singles ===
List of singles, with selected chart positions
Title	Year	Peak chart positions	Album
Title	Year	AUS	Album
"Just Can't Throw Us Away"	2009	73	non-album single
"All About Me"	2009	— (Note: "All About Me" did not enter the ARIA Top 100 Singles Chart, but peaked at number 6 on the Physical Singles Chart .)	Speak Love
"Speak Love"	2010	—	Speak Love
"Sweet Caroline	2022	—	Solitary Man
"—" denotes items which failed to chart.
