= Just Can't Throw Us Away =

Single by Hugh Sheridan
- Released: 3 September 2009
- Recorded: 2009
- Studio: Blindfaith Studios, Sydney
- Length: 3:31
- Label: Sony
- Songwriters: Peter Gorderno; Andy Jackson
- Producers: Audius; Leon Seenandan

Hugh Sheridan singles chronology
"Just Can't Throw Us Away" (2009)	"All About Me" (2009)

"Just Can't Throw Us Away" is a song written by Peter Gorderno and Andy Jackson and recorded by Australian pop singer Hugh Sheridan. The song was released on 3 September 2009 as his debut single. The song peaked at number 73 on the ARIA Charts. Sheridan performed the song live on the finale of Dancing with the Stars on 6 September.

== Track listing ==
Digital/CD

1. "Just Can't Throw Us Away" – 3:31

== Charts ==
Chart performance for "Just Can't Throw Us Away"
Chart (2009)	Peak position
Australia (ARIA)	73

== Release history ==
Region	Release date	Format	Label	Catalogue
Australia	3 September 2009	Digital download, CD single	Sony Music Australia	88697595882
