= All About Me (Hugh Sheridan song) =

Single by Hugh Sheridan

from the album Speak Love
- Released: 30 October 2009
- Recorded: 2009
- Studio: Blindfaith Studios, Sydney
- Length: 3:31
- Label: Sony
- Songwriters: Rob Wells; Matthew Martson
- Producers: Audius; Leon Seenandan

Hugh Sheridan singles chronology
"Just Can't Throw Us Away" (2009)	"All About Me" (2009)	"Speak Love" (2010)

"All About Me" is a song written by Rob Wells and Matthew Martson and recorded by Australian pop singer Hugh Sheridan. The song was released on 30 October 2009 as the lead single from Sheridan's debut studio album, Speak Love.

== Music video ==
The music video was released on 30 October 2009.

== Track listing ==
Digital/CD

1. "All About Me" – 3:31

== Charts ==
Chart (2009)	Peak position
Australian Physical Singles Chart (ARIA)	6

== Release history ==
Region	Release date	Format	Label	Catalogue
Australia	30 October 2009	Digital download, CD single	Sony Music Australia	88697609622
