= South Australian Tourism Commission =

Government authority in South Australia

South Australian Tourism Commission SA Tourism Commission

Agency overview
- Formed: 1993
- Jurisdiction: Government of South Australia
- Headquarters: Level 9, 250 Victoria Square, Adelaide
- Employees: 140 (2023)
- Annual budget: $141.5 million (2022-2023)
- Minister responsible: Zoe Bettison, Minister for Tourism
- Agency executive: Emma Terry, Chief Executive
- Website: tourism.sa.gov.au

The South Australian Tourism Commission (SATC), also known as the SA Tourism Commission, is an organisation set up by the Government of South Australia to promote tourism in South Australia.

The legislation to establish the SATC was introduced by the Hon Mike Rann, Minister for Tourism. The South Australian Tourism Commission Act 1993 was gazetted on 27 May 1993 with the agency commencing operation of 1 July 1993.

== SATC Divisions ==
- Corporate Services
- Events South Australia
- Executive Services
- Trade and International Marketing
- International Marketing
- National Trade Marketing
- Trade Events and Projects
- South Australian Visitor & Travel Centre
- Marketing Division
- Marketing Communications
- Regional Marketing
- E-Marketing and Communications
- National Tourism Accreditation Program
- Human Resources
- Tourism Development Group
- Tourism Infrastructure
- Tourism Policy & Planning Group

== Prior state government tourism agencies ==
In 1908, the state government created an agency called the State Tourist Bureau which underwent the following name changes:

1. In July 1910, renamed as the Intelligence and Tourist Bureau.
2. In 1924, renamed as the Immigration, Intelligence and Tourist Bureau.
3. In 1928, renamed as the Government Publicity and Tourist Bureau.
4. In 1958, renamed as the Immigration, Publicity and Tourist Bureau.
5. In 1972, renamed as the South Australian Government Tourist Bureau.
6. In 1981, renamed as the South Australian Government Travel Centre.

== See also ==
- Tourism in Australia
