= The Saddle Club (books) =

Children's book series

The Saddle Club is a series of intermediate children's books published by Bantam Books between 1988 and 2001. The series was created by a publishing house using the contract writing services of self-professed equestrian novice Bonnie Bryant. Many titles were also written by ghostwriters. Spin-offs include four other book series: The Saddle Club Super Editions, The Saddle Club Inside Stories, Pony Tails, and Pine Hollow. The books were adapted into a TV show also called The Saddle Club. In the 1990s, there was also a fan club with a monthly newsletter and a line of model horses manufactured by Breyer.

The books follow the adventures of best friends Carole Hanson, Stevie Lake, and Lisa Atwood, who live in the fictional town of Willow Creek, Virginia, and ride at Pine Hollow Stables. In the first book of the series, Horse Crazy, Carole and Lisa help Stevie with her mathematics project, which launches the girls' friendship and the titular club.

At the beginning of the series, Carole and Stevie are twelve-year-old seventh-graders and Lisa is a thirteen-year-old eighth-grader. Although the characters live through several vacations and years of school, they do not age until the "Pine Hollow" series.

== Structure of the Books ==
The Saddle Club is written in a third-person style. In early books, the narration was third-person limited and shifted from character to character, often offering more insight into the thoughts and feelings of the Saddle Club members and their friends; in later books, the narrative style became much more encompassing.

== Titles ==
- For a complete list of titles, see List of Saddle Club books.

== Main characters ==
=== Carole Hanson ===
- First appearance: #1, Horse Crazy,
- Age: 12
- Family: Father Mitch Hanson, a Colonel in the United States Marine Corps; mother Jeanne Hanson, a real estate agent who died from cancer when Carole was 11; a black cat from the stables who she names Snowball because he is so contrary.
- Horse(s): Starlight, originally called Pretty Boy. A bay half-Thoroughbred gelding whose registered name is Pretty Boy Floyd, that she receives as a Christmas present from the money her mother left her in #13, Starlight Christmas. Carole planned to buy the black colt Samson and sell Starlight in the "Pine Hollow" series, but she couldn't because Colonel Hanson grounded her for cheating on her history test after her grades slipped due to focusing on Samson instead of school.
- Education: The Saddle Club: 7th grader at Willow Creek Junior High School, a public school she attends with Lisa. Pine Hollow: Junior at Willow Creek High School, the local high school that she and Lisa go to.
- Personality: Carole is the best, most experienced, and most serious rider of the three; she began riding when she was four. Stable owner Max Regnery selected her as the best overall junior rider in #6, Dude Ranch. She is very organized as far as horses are concerned, but she can be scatterbrained regarding anything else. She tends to be a know-it-all at times, but sometimes it is very helpful. Carole has never fully forgiven Veronica for causing Cobalt's death.

=== Stephanie "Stevie" Lake ===
- First appearance: #1, Horse Crazy
- Age: 12
- Family: Father, a lawyer; mother Catherine, also a lawyer; older brother Chad, 14; twin brother Alex, 12; younger brother Michael, 9; a cat named Madonna.
- Horse(s): Belle, a dark bay Arabian cross Saddlebred mare whom she receives in "Horse Trade" and legally owns in "Gift Horse". She also almost bought Stewball, the skewbald gelding she rides at her friend Kate Devine's dude ranch, in "Horse Tale".
- Education: The Saddle Club: A 7th grader at Fenton Hall, a private academy she attends with her brothers and Veronica. Pine Hollow: Junior at Fenton Hall with Alex, Michael, and Veronica.
- Personality: Stevie began riding when she was eight. While intelligent in her own way, she is the least serious of the three and the most disorganized. Stevie dropped her given name, Stephanie, almost before she could talk and has always been a bit tomboyish. Now being uncomfortable with the activities other girls of her age do, but at the same time getting tired of being "one of the boys," one thing remains: her love of horses. She excels at practical jokes, one of which is her first interaction with Lisa. Ironically, one of her strongest skills is dressage, a precise type of riding that requires great subtlety and poise. Stable owner, Max Regnery, selected her as the best overall junior rider in Super Edition #3, Western Star. She is the only one who has a steady boyfriend, Phil. Stevie is the only girl in her family, and her feuds with her brothers are a major element of most of the series; her brothers love to tease her about Phil.

=== Elizabeth "Lisa" Atwood ===
- First appearance: #1, Horse Crazy
- Age: 13
- Family: Father, Richard, 42; mother, Eleanor; brother, Peter, 21, who is at college or studying abroad for most of the series; Lhasa Apso dog named Dolly; step-mom, Evelyn; half sister, Lily; aunt/godmother, Elizabeth; great aunt, Madge;Aunt Alison. Lisa's parents are divorced as of "Stray Horse". Mr. Atwood moves into an apartment so that Lisa can live with him during the weekend until he moves to California. Evelyn eventually gives birth to a baby girl named Lily before the start of the "Pine Hollow" series.
- Horse(s): Lisa never owns her own horse, although her parents once considered buying her a horse.#11, Horse Wise, they view a horse called "Pretty Boy," but Lisa knew she was not ready to own one. Lisa eventually told Carole Hanson about the horse and she ended up buying him, changing his name to Starlight. In the Pine Hollow series, Lisa's father makes plans to buy Prancer for her, a retired Thoroughbred racehorse who she rides throughout most of the series. However, Prancer dies during a difficult pregnancy, as do both of her twin foals, in Riding To Win, the ninth book of the Pine Hollow series.
- Education: The Saddle Club: An 8th grader at Willow Creek Junior High School, the public school she attends with Carole. Pine Hollow: Senior at Willow Creek High School, the local high school that she and Carole go to.
- Personality: Lisa is the oldest of the three but the newest rider; she begins in #1, Horse Crazy because her mother thinks that every young lady should know something about horses. She is extremely organized, a straight-A student, and a perfectionist. Although stable owner, Max, often tells her that she has potential, her desire to "catch up" to Carole and Stevie is an element of most of the series. Lisa is shorter than Carole and Stevie. Lisa was named after her Aunt Elizabeth.
- Inconsistencies: Lisa's brother is mentioned peripherally in two early books -- #1, Horse Crazy, in which Lisa's mother wouldn't let Lisa borrow a tie from him, and #7, Horse Play, in which he's at summer camp. Since Peter is eight years older than Lisa and living away from home for the rest of the series, it is likely that these are errors.

=== Maximilian "Max" Regnery III ===
- First appearance: #1, Horse Crazy
- Family: Grandfather, Maxmilian, who founded Pine Hollow Stables, deceased; father, Maxmilian II, deceased; mother, Elizabeth, who is known as "Mrs. Reg"; wife, Deborah Hale Regnery, a newspaper reporter who he marries in Stable Groom; oldest daughter, Maxine "Maxi" Hale Regnery, who is born in Super Edition #5, Before They Rode Horses; youngest daughter, Jeanne "Minnie" Regnry, who first appears in the Pine Hollow series.
- Horse(s): Max owns about 25 horses at the start of the series, a number that grows over the course of the books.
- Personality: Max owns the stable and also teaches classes for riders of all ages. He requires that all students not only ride but also take care of their horses, clean tack, get good grades in school, and perform chores around the stable; he believes that these are all part of what it means to ride. If the kids grades drop below a C average Max won't allow them to ride until their grades improve. In addition to being a respected teacher, he is also an accomplished rider.
- Inconsistencies: Max's full name has been spelled Maxmillian, Maximillian, and Maximilian at various points in the series.

=== Elizabeth "Mrs. Reg" Regnery ===
- First appearance: #1, Horse Crazy
- Family: Father-in-law, Maxmilian, who founded Pine Hollow Stables, deceased; husband, Maxmilian II, deceased; son, Maxmilian "Max" III; daughter-in-law, Deborah Hale; granddaughter, Maxine "Maxi" Hale Regnery; granddaughter Jeanne "Minnie/Mini" Regnery.
- Horse(s): It is implied that when Max II died, he left the stable to his son, not his wife. Mrs. Reg rides frequently, but does not own her own personal horse. She often rides the white Arabian gelding Barq.
- Personality: Mrs. Reg manages the stable, schedules classes, and coordinates orders and special events. She dislikes seeing people stand around with nothing to do and often assigns them odd jobs if they aren't already working. She is also famous for telling stories that are seemingly unrelated to the situations that The Saddle Club finds itself in. Mrs. Reg retires to Florida before the start of the Pine Hollow series.

=== Veronica DiAngelo ===
- First appearance: #1, Horse Crazy
- Family: Father, a banker and the richest man in Willow Creek; mother, a prominent social figure; multiple dogs, including two black Labradors, a poodle named Robespierre, and a puppy named Sugarlump.
- Horse(s): Princess, a pony that she owned when she was 11 before the series started; Cobalt, a black Thoroughbred stallion who is put down as a result of her carelessness in #2, Horse Shy; Garnet, a chestnut Arabian mare that her parents buy for her in #11, Horse Wise; Go For Blue "Danny", a well-trained, schoolmaster dapple gray Thoroughbred gelding that her parents buy for her in #49, Stable Farewell.
- Education: A 7th-grader at Fenton Hall, a private academy where she attends with Stevie and Stevie's brothers.
- Personality: Veronica is an extremely spoiled Italian American girl. She acts as The Saddle Club's perpetual enemy, particularly Stevie's, since the girls attend the same school. Veronica always has the latest clothes and doesn't approve of The Saddle Club's simpler style. Earlier books are more generous toward Veronica, suggesting that she acts badly because her parents have little time for her and often agree to buy her something as a means of solving problems. Veronica's character suggests that she would love to be part of The Saddle Club, but chooses to keep people at arm's length from her. She doesn't seem like she can trust people as she's been let down by her own parents many times. Her spoiled exterior seems like a cover for her true feelings. Veronica cried when she sold Garnet in #49, Stable Farewell, indicating that she really cared about her even though she fussed over Danny and took care of him.

== Recurring characters ==
- Dr. Judy Barker - equine veterinarian who treats most Pine Hollow horses. First appears in #3, Horse Sense.
- John Brightstar - son of Walter Brightstar, a wrangler at the Bar None Ranch. First appears in #24, Ghost Rider.
- Marie Dana - injured in a car accident that killed her father and left her unable to walk for months; The Saddle Club befriends her and helps her recover. First appears in #16, Horse Games.
- Dorothy DeSoto Hawthorne - former student of Max Regnery and an excellent rider; suffers an injury in #8, Horse Show, that ends her career as a competitive rider, so she has to sell her horse Topside to Max. Stevie rides Topside until she owns her own horse, Belle. She marries Nigel Hawthorne in #27, Bridle Path. The Saddle Club see her and Nigel in many other books.
- Kate Devine - former champion junior rider and a friend of The Saddle Club; her parents, Frank and Phyllis, know Mitch Hanson from when Frank was a pilot in the United States Marine Corps. They now own a dude ranch in the Southwest called the Bar None Ranch. Like Merrill, Phil, A.J., Christine and Cam, Kate is an honorary member of The Saddle Club. First appears in #4, Horse Power.
- Callie Forester - First appears in the Pine Hollow series. Callie is Scott's sister and she is younger by one year. In the first Pine Hollow book, Stevie is driving her friends during a bad storm. She swerves to avoid Callie's horse, who was spooked into the road. After hitting Callie's horse Fez, the car rolled into a ravine, injuring Callie severely. Callie survived the accident, but Fez was killed. Callie is a private person.
- Scott Forester - First appears in the Pine Hollow series. Scott is Callie's brother and is older by one year. After his sister Callie is injured in a car accident, he blames Stevie. Scott has trouble forgiving Stevie for the accident which hurt his sister and killed her horse Fez.
- Eli Grimes - wrangler at the Bar None Ranch, who considers the members of The Saddle Club "dudes" when he first meets them in #6, Dude Ranch. He starts a riding summer camp with his wife, Jeannie, in #29, Ranch Hands.
- Jasmine James - eight year old rider at Pine Hollow; she and her best friends become the main characters of the spin off series Pony Tails.
- May Grover - eight year old rider at Pine Hollow; she and her best friends become the main characters of the spin off series Pony Tails. First appears in #21, Racehorse, when she starts taking riding lessons at Pine Hollow and joins Horse Wise. Has a pony named Luna because of the perfect moon shaped mark on his face, and later a pony named Macaroni.
- Corey Takamura - eight year old Asian American rider at Pine Hollow; she and her best friends become the main characters of the spin off series Pony Tails. Her mother, Dr. Takamura, is a small animal vet.
- Erin Mosley - a spoiled eight-year-old girl who is the main rival of Jasmine, May, and Corey and one of the main characters in the spin off series Pony Tails. Erin started taking riding lessons at Pine Hollow prior to the series. Erin is described as a "goody-goody" who tattles on others.
- Nigel Hawthorne - Dorothy DeSoto's British husband; also a rider. First appears in #27, Bridle Path.
- Christine Lonetree - A kind hearted Native American girl whom the Saddle Club and Kate Devine first meet in #6, Dude Ranch; her German Shepherd Tomahawk dies saving Stevie from a rattlesnake. She becomes an honorary member of The Saddle Club in #12, Rodeo Rider.
- Phil Marsten - Stevie's boyfriend; he lives in Cross County, which is about fifteen miles away from Willow Creek. Phil has a Quarter Horse named Teddy, who has a tendency to spook. Like Kate, Christine, A.J., and Cam, Phil is an honorary member of The Saddle Club. First appears in #10, Riding Camp.
- Denise McCaskill - Pine Hollow stablehand and Red's girlfriend. First appears in #45, Stable Groom.
- A.J. McDonnell - Phil's best friend and a fellow rider at Cross County Stables. Like Kate, Christine, Phil, and Cam, A.J. is an honorary member of The Saddle Club. He owns a gray mare named Crystal. First appears in #13, Starlight Christmas.
- Cam Nelson - A young African American rider from Arden Hills whom Carole first meets over an Internet message board. First appears in #25, Show Horse. Cam has a horse named Duffy. He moves to California when his dad gets a new job in #49, Stable Farewell. Cam returns to Willow Creek in the Pine Hollow series, but things don't work out between him and Carole and they break up.
- Red O'Malley - The head stablehand at Pine Hollow and Denise's boyfriend. Red is polite and is often stuck doing Veronica's chores and looking after her horse.
- Skye Ransom - A seventeen year old actor whom The Saddle Club meets and teaches to ride in #8, Horse Show. He often returns in books where he is filming a movie and requires The Saddle Club's help.
- Lady Theresa "Tessa" - An English lady whom Lisa meets and befriends in England when Tessa falls off her horse in #29, Ranch Hands.
- Emily Williams - A young rider with cerebral palsy. The Saddle Club meets and befriends Emily and her horse P.C. in #52, Riding Class. She is also an honorary member of the Saddle Club. P.C.'s initials do not stand for anything in particular. Their meaning changes according to Emily's whims. Emily also appears in the Pine Hollow series until her family moves to Australia.

== Awards ==
In 2003 the series was awarded a BILBY Award.

== Spin-Offs ==
=== Books ===
Two additional types and two series of books were spun off following the popularity of The Saddle Club.

The Saddle Club Super Edition books also focus on Carole, Lisa, and Stevie, but are longer and occasionally written in a different style. For example, Super Edition #1, A Summer Without Horses, is broken into four sections, and the first three are about Lisa, Stevie, and Carole's personal experiences. Other Super Editions follow the same third-person narrative style of the regular series. For more information about the Super Editions, see the List of Saddle Club books.

The Inside Story books are written as diaries or journals. In each, the premise is that the title character - Stevie, Lisa, or Carole - is doing a project or writing a journal that requires her to explain her impressions of events in regular The Saddle Club books that involved all three girls. The Inside Story books are longer than the Super Editions. For more information about the Inside Story books, see the List of Saddle Club books.

The Pony Tails books are a spinoff series aimed at young readers ages 7–10. They focus on May Grover, Corey Takamura, and Jasmine James, who are also riders at Pine Hollow and form their own club called the Pony Tails.

The Pine Hollow books are a spinoff series aimed at teen and young adult readers. They focus on the same characters four years later, beginning during the summer before Lisa's senior year of high school and Carole and Stevie's junior year. Many characters from the Saddle Club books reappear in the Pine Hollow series, and two major new characters—Scott and Callie Forester—were introduced. The last Pine Hollow book, #17, Full Gallop, was written in 2001 and is chronologically the last book in the Saddle Club canon.

In 1990, a short story called Happy Horse Day! was published along with a short story in the Fabulous Five series by Betsy Haynes. The book was included in a Jean Nate gift set of bath products for girls.

=== TV series ===
From 2001-2009, The Saddle Club was adapted into a TV series called The Saddle Club, which was filmed and set in Australia. There are notable differences between the characters and plotlines in the books and the TV series. The show ran for three seasons and has been broadcast on ABC and FOX8 in Australia, on Discovery Kids and public television in the United States, on YTV network in Canada, and on PopGirl in the UK. Episodes are available on DVD.

In February 2026, it was announced that the franchise would receive a CGI animated adaptation, set to be delivered to broadcasters from mid-2027; European broadcasters France Télévisions (France), RAI (Italy) and ZDF (Germany) jointly commissioned the project, production of which will be led by French company Frog Box and Italy's Red Monk Studio.
