= Fabulous Four =

The Fabulous Four may refer to:

- Fab Four, the Beatles
- The Fabulous Four (Swedish band) (1965–1968), with Lalla Hansson
- a group of boxers from the 1980s consisting of Sugar Ray Leonard, Roberto Durán, Thomas Hearns, and Marvin Hagler
- a nickname for Naval Mobile Construction Battalion 4
- Fabulous Four or Spin Quartet, nickname for four spinners in Indian cricket: Bishan Singh Bedi, B. S. Chandrashekhar, E. A. S. Prasanna and S. Venkataraghavan
- a group of cricketers who all debuted around the same time: Virat Kohli, Joe Root, Kane Williamson, and Steve Smith, coined in 2014 by Martin Crowe
- The Fabulous Four, a 2024 film directed by Jocelyn Moorhouse
- One of the Million Dollar Backfields

== See also ==
- Fab Four (disambiguation)
- Fantastic Four (disambiguation)
