= Fox hunt (disambiguation) =

Fox hunting is an activity involving the tracking, chase and, if caught, the killing of a fox.

Fox hunt may refer to:

- Fox Hunt, a 1992 novel in the Saddle Club series by Bonnie Bryant
- Foxhunt (EP), a 2005 EP by Dukes of Windsor
- Fox Hunt (novel), a 2006 novel by James Clancy Phelan
- Fox Hunt (video game), a 1996 video game by Capcom
- "Fox Hunt", a 1985 episode of Crazy Like a Fox
- "Fox Hunt", a 2003 episode of A Town Called Panic
- "Fox Hunt" (Murdoch Mysteries), a 2020 television episode
- Operation Fox Hunt, a Chinese covert global operation whose stated aim is anti-corruption

The Fox Hunt may refer to:

- The Fox Hunt (painting), an 1893 oil on canvas painting by Winslow Homer
- The Fox Hunt (1931 film), a Silly Symphony short film by Walt Disney
- The Fox Hunt (1938 film), a Donald Duck short film by Walt Disney
- The Fox Hunt, a 1950 Heckle and Jeckle short film by Terrytoons
- "The Fox Hunt", a 1955 episode of Stage 7
- "The Fox Hunt", a 1956 episode of I Love Lucy
- "The Fox Hunt", a 1988 episode of Gumby Adventures
- "The Fox Hunt", a 2012 episode of Ben and Kate

Fox hunting may refer to:

- Fox-hunting, an 1872 book by C. A. Stephens
- Fox Hunting, a 1936 book by William Fawcett
- Fox Hunting (film), a 1980 Russian film
- "Fox Hunting" (Butterflies), a 1979 television episode
- Radio fox hunting, a form of orienteering and radiosport

== See also ==
- Fox Hunters' Chase, a National Hunt steeplechase in England
- Bosko's Fox Hunt, a 1931 one-reel short subject featuring Bosko; part of the Looney Tunes series
- The Wolf and Fox Hunt, a c.1616 painting by Peter Paul Rubens now held in the Metropolitan Museum of Art in New York
- Memoirs of a Fox-Hunting Man, a 1928 novel by Siegfried Sassoon
