= Horse race (disambiguation) =

A horse race is a speed competition involving horses.

Horse race or horse racing may also refer to:

== General topics ==
- Horse race (politics)
- Horse race journalism

== Literature ==
- Horse Race, a 1997 novel by Bonnie Bryant, the 70th installment in The Saddle Club book series

== Television ==
- "Horse Race", Roger Ramjet season 3, episode 23 (1967)
- "Horse Race", The Life and Legend of Wyatt Earp season 4, episode 25 (1959)
- "The Horse Race", Close to Home (1989 TV series) series 1, episode 4 (1989)
- "The Horse Race", Crime Time episode 54 (2008)
- "The Horse Race", Planet of the Apes episode 9 (1974)

== Other uses ==
- Horse Racing (video game), a 1980 video game
- Horserace (drinking game)

== See also ==
- Race Horse (clipper)
