= List of Las Vegas episodes =

Las Vegas is an American television series that aired on NBC from September 22, 2003 to February 15, 2008. It focuses on a team of people working in the fictional Montecito Resort and Casino in Las Vegas dealing with issues that arise within the working environment, ranging from valet parking and restaurant management to casino security. The series originally aired on Monday nights, though NBC moved the series to Friday nights in 2006. The show is currently in syndication and airs in the United States on USA Network.

Las Vegas ran for five years, a total of 106 episodes aired over 5 seasons. In the final season, only 19 episodes of the originally-planned 22-episode season were filmed at the time the show was cancelled in 2008. The final episode ended with a cliffhanger with many issues left unresolved.

== Series overview ==
Season	Episodes	Originally released	
Season	Episodes	First released	Last released
1	23	September 22, 2003	May 17, 2004
2	24	September 13, 2004	May 23, 2005
3	23	September 19, 2005	May 12, 2006
4	17	October 27, 2006	March 9, 2007
5	19	September 28, 2007	February 15, 2008

== Episodes ==
=== Season 1 (2003–04) ===
No. overall	No. in season	Title	Directed by	Written by	Original release date	U.S. viewers (millions)
1	1	"Pilot"	Michael W. Watkins	Gary Scott Thompson	September 22, 2003	12.30
Danny has a busy day coddling an oddball winner, trying to locate a missing high roller, and figuring out a cheater's MO. Big Ed walks in on his daughter Delinda and Danny together in bed.
2	2	"What Happens in Vegas, Stays in Vegas"	Michael W. Watkins	Gary Scott Thompson	September 29, 2003	11.50
Danny's friend Greg is found murdered in the desert. A reporter is hot on the trail of a naughty Senator. "King Arthur" is riding through the casino.
3	3	"Donny We Hardly Knew Ye"	Kevin Hooks	Gardner Stern	October 6, 2003	10.70
Danny and Ed uncover a car thief. Ed's cousin, Donny, meets the woman of his dreams at the roulette wheel and decides to get married immediately. Delinda ends things with Danny and wants a job at the Montecito.
4	4	"Jokers and Fools"	Timothy Busfield	Rebecca Rand Kirshner	October 13, 2003	10.60
Nessa secretly meets with a cheater busted by Ed and Danny. A psychic gives Mary a dire prediction about his next show. Delinda starts work in the kitchen, but isn't there long.
5	5	"Groundhog Summer"	Michael W. Watkins	Michael Berns & Matt Pyken & Gary Scott Thompson	October 20, 2003	11.50
Inundated with sci-fi geeks and girls in bikinis hoping to enjoy the last few weeks of summer, Danny and Ed hunt for a sexual predator preying upon unsuspecting women including Delinda. Mike Cannon investigates the intentions of three MIT students.
6	6	"Semper Spy"	Guy Norman Bee	Michael Berns & Matt Pyken	November 3, 2003	11.70
Ed takes a "Hawaiian vacation," leaving Danny in charge. Mike becomes the good luck charm for a gambler on a hot streak.
7	7	"Pros and Cons"	Greg Yaitanes	Daniel Arkin	November 10, 2003	10.70
Mary gets Wayne Newton to help an unlucky couple. A grifter passes counterfeit casino chips to Delinda. Sam is kept busy by two regulars who bet on anything.
8	8	"Luck Be a Lady"	Michael W. Watkins	Kyle Harimoto	November 17, 2003	11.20
Ed's ex-CIA partner (Mimi Rogers) is in charge of security for a pop star when issues regarding her security, and life, arise. Sam gets in trouble with a full RFB comp VIP who refuses to gamble. A group of young girls comes to celebrate their friend's 21st birthday with gambling the instant she turns 21, putting the Montecito in trouble when her clock is slightly off.
9	9	"Year of the Tiger"	Perry Lang	Adele Lim	December 1, 2003	12.80
A high roller's rowdy daughters become Danny's responsibility. A small-town fiancé is seduced by the tables as Mary organizes a group wedding. Mike is sued by a drunk woman he rescues.
10	10	"Decks and Violence"	Guy Norman Bee	Vanessa Reisen	December 15, 2003	11.40
Vanko and Vera are a husband and wife magic act duo. When Vera disappears as scheduled during Vanko's disappearing trick but fails to return, Ed and Danny try to figure out what happened. Mike's college buddy Ben Pearce is in town. A convention of swizzle-stick collectors requires extra security.
11	11	"Blood and Sand"	Fred Keller	David Graziano	January 5, 2004	13.20
The casino hosts a championship boxing match in which Ed and Danny find an irregular pattern of betting. Delinda, Nessa and Mike find a bag of cash. Blue Man Group has a cameo.
12	12	"Hellraisers and Heartbreakers"	Timothy Busfield	Michael Berns & Matt Pyken	January 12, 2004	13.90
Big Ed's former CIA protégé Jack Keller (Alec Baldwin), is now a security consultant supervising the Montecito's switch from analog to digital surveillance. Brooks and Dunn get on a lengthy roll at the craps table. Ed sees red when a comic turns blue. Sam and Danny spend a little quality time together.
13	13	"The Night the Lights Went Out in Vegas"	Craig Zisk	Gary Scott Thompson	January 26, 2004	13.40
Sin City screeches to a halt as a massive power outage brings down the light of the strip, locking down the Montecito, while a mysterious hotel guest is shot on the casino floor. In the midst of the blackout, super sleuths Nessa and Delinda attempt to find the casino killer, while a semi-delirious Sam flirts with paranoia as she suspects the murder to be part of an elaborate cover-up.
14	14	"Things That Go Jump in the Night"	Paul Shapiro	Gardner Stern	February 2, 2004	12.70
When a suicidal hotel guest (Jon Lovitz) declares his life-ending intentions, Danny and Ed race to stop him from taking a flying leap off of the Montecito. Pleading to save the guest's life with the help of a little Vegas magic, Danny and Ed introduce him to the joys of gambling, but their plans backfire when he hits a major winning streak. Meanwhile, Sam lets herself get a little too close to a client only to have her romantic dreams ruined when his fiancé (Paris Hilton) comes to town. Ed struggles with an over-eager security guard.
15	15	"Die Fast, Die Furious"	Tucker Gates	Kyle Harimoto & Adele Lim	February 9, 2004	12.10
With the Montecito playing host to the production crew for the feature film Die Fast, Die Furious starring Hollywood action star Jean-Claude Van Damme (as himself), Ed maintains a watchful eye on the film's intense stunts. But when Van Damme soars to his death while attempting to perform the movie's key stunt – a dangerous motorcycle jump - Ed and Danny search for an explanation for the accident.
16	16	"New Orleans"	Timothy Busfield	Gary Scott Thompson	February 16, 2004	12.68
When a "whale" blows town while owing the Montecito almost $4.5 million, Ed has 36 hours to find the missing trust-fund baby and force him to make good on the debt. However, when the AWOL gambler turns up at the Montecito's sister resort in New Orleans, Danny, Sam and Ed hop a plane to "The Big Easy" to track their fugitive player.
17	17	"You Can't Take It with You"	Greg Yaitanes	Keith Kaczorek	March 1, 2004	12.97
When a less than brilliant townie (Sean Astin) hits a big cash jackpot at the Montecito, Danny draws the challenging task of securing the winner and his bag full of cash only to watch Vegas' newest millionaire die from an alleged heart attack. However, when the man's greedy wife turns up to claim his winnings and discovers both the body and the cash are MIA, Danny smells a scam and scours the city for the missing money.
18	18	"Nevada State"	Timothy Busfield	Daniel Arkin & Vanessa Reisen	March 15, 2004	12.10
An escaped murderer seeks revenge against Sam for testifying against him, as Ed and Danny try to protect her. The Montecito hosts a statewide cheerleading competition. Nessa discusses the merits of Manchester United with a trio of rowdy British soccer fans.
19	19	"Sons and Lovers"	David Solomon	Gardner Stern	March 22, 2004	13.60
When one of the Montecito's guests wins big, his wallet is snatched before he can indulge in his winnings, forcing Danny, Sam and Ed to search the premises for the thieves. When the wallet is graciously returned, Danny and Sam give the Good Samaritan a priceless reward. Elsewhere, there is a suspicious machine on the floor with an unusually high payout pattern, and it's up to the Montecito's security team to figure out if it's a defective machine or a strategically deceiving guest.
20	20	"The Strange Life of Bob"	Michael Grossman	David Graziano & Rebecca Rand Kirshner	April 19, 2004	11.06
Falling in love with a new temporary Montecito employee known only as "Bob the floater" (Christian Kane), Nessa begins pressing her new mystery man for more personal details. However, when she discovers that her new beau is actually suffering from amnesia and walked into the hotel several days ago hoping to jar his memory, Nessa turns to Ed in the hopes of uncovering the truth about Bob.
21	21	"Family Jewels"	Timothy Busfield	Eva Nagorski	April 26, 2004	11.43
When five million dollars in diamonds is stolen from a Montecito guest, Danny enlists Mike's technical expertise to determine the techniques used by the mysterious thief. However, Mike's involvement sends him off on a detective tangent as he is determined to solve the great jewel caper. A psychologist analyzes the Montecito team. The four ladies plan to break up a wedding.
22	22	"The Big Bang"	Allison Liddi-Brown	Michael Berns & Matt Pyken	May 10, 2004	11.26
While attempting to comfort a concerned gambler who is demanding his favorite dealer, Nessa discovers the diehard blackjack player has a bomb strapped to his chest. As she casually alerts Ed – who joins the nervous bomber at the table - Nessa attempts to talk him down while Danny discovers the horrifying truth that a second bomb has been planted inside the hotel by an accomplice.
23	23	"Always Faithful"	Timothy Busfield	Gary Scott Thompson	May 17, 2004	12.91
In the first season's finale, Danny is recalled to the Marines, effective in 24 hours. While he is getting his affairs in order, Mary has a visit from her father. Danny and Mary confront him together, and when he tells her that he has two little girls, she decides to tell his wife what he did to his first little girl. The casino is also dealing with counterfeit money, and Mike is at the forefront of solving the crime.

=== Season 2 (2004–05) ===
No. overall	No. in season	Title	Directed by	Written by	Original release date	U.S. viewers (millions)
24	1	"Have You Ever Seen the Rain?"	Craig Zisk	Gary Scott Thompson	September 13, 2004	12.01
Danny returns from the war, much to the surprise and joy of everybody, particularly Mary. However, he is acting strangely as he is in warshock. He begins to worry everybody, particularly Ed and Mary. The guys of the casino are also contending with two of the dumbest guys on Earth, one of whom has a microchip implant in his arm. The new guy Leo has a thing for Delinda, and Sam and Delinda are at odds as Sam wants to hire out Mystique to a group of rich morticians.
25	2	"The Count of Montecito"	Daniel Sackheim	Gardner Stern	September 20, 2004	12.08
Danny, Mike and Sam scurry to solve the tactics of a ring of card counters. Meanwhile, Nessa is faced with the return of Fred Puterbaugh (Jon Lovitz) who professes his love and admiration to her, much to her dismay. Elsewhere, Ed and Danny deal with an archeologist's find near the hotel pool that leads to a scam. Mary has to give orientation to topless women, employed by the hotel to entertain guests.
26	3	"Blood Is Thicker"	Allison Liddi-Brown	Matt Pyken	September 27, 2004	11.56
Ed is framed for murder when enemies from his past resurface. Danny and Mike secretly intervene to investigate and take matters into their own hands. Meanwhile, Sam, Nessa, Mary and Delinda desperately attempt to find tenants for their new joint-purchased home, settling on what they think to be the perfect tenants, only to discover they've misjudged the situation.
27	4	"Catch of the Day"	Peter O'Fallon	Michael Berns	October 4, 2004	11.24
Sam has to jet off across the country in search of replacement lobsters when a truckload she purchased for a very important wedding, is stolen. Danny and Mike play detectives to determine the motive and culprit behind the theft. Meanwhile, Delinda's childhood boyfriend Jay (Geoff Stults), shows up with news that he's dying of cancer - and of his final wish to sleep with her. He asks all the girls to sleep with him, but Sam ultimately succumbs because Jay is the "perfect one night stand".
28	5	"Good Run of Bad Luck"	Stephen Williams	Kim Newton	October 11, 2004	12.37
Danny agrees to help a former Marine's wife out by caring for her 8-month baby boy while she attends an interview, but concern is raised when she doesn't return, leaving Danny to investigate the reason.
29	6	"Games People Play"	Jeff Woolnough	Adele Lim	October 18, 2004	11.01
Nessa is stunned when a mysterious woman shows up at the Montecito with news that her father is alive and wants to communicate with her. She begins to question what Ed has told her of her father's whereabouts which leads her right into a trap that affects the whole casino.
30	7	"Montecito Lancers"	John Fortenberry	Kyle Harimoto	November 1, 2004	12.52
As they prepare their youth football team for the Casino League Championship game, Danny and Mike search for a missing casino employee and aspiring inventor whose hobby may have gotten him into serious trouble. Ed oversees the city-wide search for the missing man, who is the father of one of the boys on the team.
31	8	"Two of a Kind"	Allison Liddi-Brown	Michael Berns & Gary Scott Thompson	November 8, 2004	14.80
Ed, Danny, and Mike combine forces with Dr. Jordan Cavanaugh (Jill Hennessy) and Det. Woody Hoyt (Jerry O'Connell) to solve the murder of a high-stakes gambler. The mystery intensifies when it appears that the gambler's wife may not be the only woman who wants him dead. This episode concludes a crossover with Crossing Jordan that begins on "What Happens in Vegas Dies in Boston".
32	9	"Degas Away with It"	Peter Markle	Matt Pyken & Gardner Stern	November 15, 2004	11.88
Ed uses his past connections and some old-school tactics to hunt down the man who stole a priceless work of art from the Montecito. His frantic search for the piece leads to an uncomfortable reunion with his former CIA protege, Jack Keller (Alec Baldwin), who cannot be trusted. Meanwhile, Sam assists a young couple in love (Andrew Bowen and Joanna Krupa).
33	10	"Silver Star"	Robert Duncan McNeill	Gary Scott Thompson	November 29, 2004	11.61
Ed and Mike piece together the clues of a possible kidnapping. Their efforts lead to a man with a criminal past and also force Mike to recall a terrible memory from his childhood. Danny and Mary leave Las Vegas for a romantic trip to Los Angeles, amidst rumors that they will return either as a married couple or break up.
34	11	"My Beautiful Launderette"	Peter O'Fallon	Vanessa Reisen	December 6, 2004	12.24
Sam gets involved with a drug cartel when she learns that one of her clients is illegally laundering drug money through the Montecito. When Ed finds out, Sam agrees to help the FBI capture several key members of the cartel to help put an end to them. Mike tries to impress a hotel guest in which he believes they are fated to be together. Delinda becomes obsessed with a Rodeo Racer.
35	12	"When You Got to Go, You Got to Go"	Bryan Spicer	Matt Pyken	January 3, 2005	13.10
When Ed is kidnapped, Danny and Mike begin a frantic search of the city to find him. The fact that Ed refuses to let them contact authorities or pay the kidnapper's ransom only makes their search more difficult. Sam arranges a Vegas-style wedding for one of her clients, but it comes to a screeching halt when their lucky rings are lost. This episode includes a performance by Duran Duran playing at the casino.
36	13	"Sperm Whales and Spearmint Rhinos"	James A. Contner	Kim Newton	January 10, 2005	12.63
Chaos is set in motion when Danny and Delinda find a hotel guest who appears to have committed suicide. When Delinda investigates further, she suspects murder and dispatches Danny and Ed on a mission to find the killer which places Delinda in jeopardy. Mike tries to win back his college sweetheart who happens to be in town gambling at the casino, sadly he is given an odd offer from his ex-college sweetheart.
37	14	"The Lie Is Cast"	Brad Turner	Gardner Stern	January 17, 2005	12.64
Danny is accused of sexual misconduct by a beautiful construction company CEO after the woman was thrown out of the Montecito by Ed for being rude to his employees. Ed must use old contacts to ensure justice prevails. Delinda enlists the help of singer Paul Anka to convince her arrogant chef Gunther that the restaurant should be open for lunch.
38	15	"Whale of a Time"	Paul Holahan	Michael Berns	January 24, 2005	12.38
Ed receives an unexpected visit from the beautiful former co-worker Lisa (Noa Tishby), whose mere presence puts everyone's lives in serious danger. Danny and Mike are enlisted to protect the gorgeous woman with a mysterious background, and find it to be much harder than expected. Delinda and Nessa compete for the affection of a high-roller.
39	16	"Can You See What I See?"	Tawnia McKiernan	Matt Pyken	February 7, 2005	11.84
When the hotel enters one of its slowest weeks of the year, Ed decides to stir things up a bit by switching everyone's job positions around so they can walk in one another's shoes. Delinda takes over for Ed and finds herself bored stiff after having to attend a city hall meeting while Sam and Mary take over surveillance. Meanwhile, Danny is in charge of the casino floor and runs into an old high school buddy who's having extremely unusual and suspicious luck winning millions of dollars.
40	17	"Tainted Love"	Allison Liddi-Brown	Gary Scott Thompson	February 14, 2005	12.06
It's Valentine's Day, and Ed's attempts at avoiding jury duty fail, as he finds himself investigating for the defendant. Sam is over the moon about hosting the "whale of all whales" – a billionaire (Dean Cain) she's hooked to stay at the Montecito. With her hands full, she tosses her other clients onto Mary and Delinda. Things get out of hand when Mary's millionaires turn out to be cheating the horse racing system requiring Danny to fly up to come to her aid. Meanwhile, Sam falls apart when she realizes that the billionaire is her husband, whom she's been separated from for seven years.
41	18	"To Protect and Serve Manicotti"	Paul Michael Glaser	Gardner Stern	February 21, 2005	12.14
When a local restaurateur, and mother of a Montecito showgirl, is approached by petty mobsters, Ed enlists the support of a former CIA associate "Frank the Repairman" (Sylvester Stallone) to squash their extortion attempts. As the two navigate their way through the local mob's hierarchy, Ed discovers that he has a decades-old connection to the ringleader. Delinda and Nessa rival for the attention of Fear Factor host Joe Rogan.
42	19	"One Nation, Under Surveillance"	Brad Turner	Vincent Guastaferro	March 14, 2005	12.10
When an ex-Marine turned local politician is embroiled in a sordid scandal with a 16-year-old runaway, Danny vows to clear his comrade's name, but he soon learns that people aren't always as they appear when an even seedier truth is revealed. Elsewhere, a seemingly average Joe is willing to risk his mundane existence for one shot at living large. Meanwhile, Ed discovers a potential nexus between Sam and a major drug distribution ring.
43	20	"Hit Me!"	Tim Matheson	Michael Berns & Kim Newton	March 28, 2005	11.63
When cutting-edge surveillance technology fails to catch a thief in the act, Ed must rely on good ol' human ingenuity to crack the case. Elsewhere, Mary, Delinda and Mike intervene when a cheating husband is caught red-handed. Meanwhile, when the Montecito's grooviest high-roller is in need of vintage duds, only Emmy-winner Don Knotts (as himself, The Andy Griffith Show) can keep his polyester groove alive.
44	21	"Hide and Sneak"	Robert Duncan McNeill	Keith Kaczorek	April 25, 2005	11.88
Ed suspects that the Montecito's security system has been breached and that he and his hotel staff are now under surveillance, Danny and Mike are employed to expose the identity of the phantom mole. Meanwhile, Sam is seduced by a high-rolling vampire when he mysteriously appears in her room. Elsewhere, Delinda escorts her sheepishly innocent Amish cousin as he sows his oats on the Vegas strip before returning to the simple life.
45	22	"Letters, Lawyers and Loose Women"	Tawnia McKiernan	Matt Pyken	May 2, 2005	10.96
Mary meets her secret admirer but faces legal issues on the road to romance. When a philandering hotel guest (Dave Foley) loses his wedding ring at a local brothel, Mike agrees to help him find it by investigating the establishment. Meanwhile, Danny and Ed do some investigating of their own to respect a friend's last wish for justice.
46	23	"Magic Carpet Fred"	Robert Duncan McNeill	Gary Scott Thompson	May 9, 2005	11.36
When the colorful billionaire Fred Puterbaugh (Jon Lovitz) returns to the Montecito, with new girlfriend singing star Ashanti (as herself), there is bound to be some great entertainment. But once Ed and Danny discover exactly what brought the incorrigible billionaire back to Vegas, an audacious performance is the least of their worries. Meanwhile, a beguiling magician uses his skills to help Ed catch a slippery thief.
47	24	"Centennial"	David Solomon	Gary Scott Thompson	May 23, 2005	11.27
In the final episode of the series' second season, the new owner of the Montecito will be making some big changes to both the staff and property at the casino. Note; this is the last appearance of Marsha Thomason as Nessa Holt.

=== Season 3 (2005–06) ===
No. overall	No. in season	Title	Directed by	Written by	Original release date	U.S. viewers (millions)
48	1	"Viva Las Vegas"	David Solomon	Gary Scott Thompson	September 19, 2005	12.49
In the third season premiere, Ed's got major problems as the revamped Montecito struggles to finish work in time to re-open on new owner Monica Mancuso's (Lara Flynn Boyle) schedule as he also tries to lure back Danny and his former staff to prevent a suspected "smash-and-grab" heist that has hit other casinos.
49	2	"Fake the Money and Run"	Tim Matheson	Gardner Stern	September 26, 2005	12.13
The casino has reopened. Ed and Mike work on a case of counterfeit casino chips. Per his accountant's suggestion, Danny must sell his father's house. Later, Danny's accountant is part of a poker game where one of the players is a man who robs one of the casino's guests. Monica Mancuso, the new owner, wants a dealer to be fired because he keeps dealing winning hands to the players.
50	3	"Double Down, Triple Threat"	Paul Michael Glaser	Matt Pyken	October 3, 2005	13.64
Danny is with blackjack player Gabe Labrador who's wearing a wig and counting cards. The man doesn't want to stop playing and claims he must win big to pay off the men who kidnapped his daughter. Ed, Mike, Danny and a cop from Metro work on the case even though they aren't sure Gabe is telling the truth. Mary helps Danny take care of his dad's stuff. This episode concludes a crossover with Crossing Jordan that begins on "Luck Be a Lady".
51	4	"Whatever Happened to Seymour Magoon?"	Jefery Levy	Kim Newton	October 10, 2005	13.59
Sam's whale is named Trey Cooper, a handsome 30-year-old who brought his Great Dane to the casino. There are a lot of dogs around the casino as the Nevada State Dog Show is taking place. Jillian enters the Deline's dog in the competition. Monica and Danny meet with an 80-year-old woman named Dottie. Monica offers $3 million for Dottie's house in order to renovate the Montecito's golf course.
52	5	"Big Ed De-cline"	Tawnia McKiernan	Matthew Miller	October 17, 2005	12.64
After Ed's doctor warns him that his blood pressure is dangerously high, Ed becomes the victim of identity theft. Sam's half-brother visits. Mike borrows Ed's Aston Martin with unforeseen consequences.
53	6	"The Real McCoy"	Félix Enríquez Alcalá	Vanessa Reisen	October 24, 2005	11.31
Sam's brother is staying longer than expected because he's having an affair with Monica. Danny tracks down the woman who appears in photos with his father. Danny begins to have an uneasy feeling about Penny and discovers a connection with his father's mystery woman. In another dispute with Monica, Ed fires Monica's new efficiency manager. Mary returns to work at the Montecito as Hotel Manager.
54	7	"Everything Old Is You Again"	David Solomon	Gardner Stern	November 7, 2005	10.81
Danny imagines to be back in 1962 when the Montecito was called The Jubilee. Ed becomes the new president of the casino. He makes Danny the director of entertainment and Mike the head of security. Mary is a waitress who gets a promotion. Delinda opens a dress shop. And Sam starts out as a call girl.
55	8	"Bold, Beautiful and Blue"	Jeff Woolnough	Matt Pyken	November 14, 2005	11.36
A necklace with a priceless gemstone, the Star of Kashmir, is on show at the Montecito. Monica decides that it is not to be protected by bulletproof glass, since it's too beautiful. Monica shuts down the security system to secretly try on the sapphire, but when the cameras are turned on afterwards the sapphire is gone. Danny and Mike try to find the sapphire before showtime, while Ed still refuses to come back.
56	9	"Mothwoman"	Craig Zisk	Gary Scott Thompson	November 21, 2005	12.39
The Montecito hosts a comic book convention. Mary is checking into the Montecito for a while. Sam is after the black book of one of the world's greatest casino hosts who just died. Monica wants Danny to be less like Ed. Danny is worried about Monica as owner of the Montecito and calls Casey Manning behind Monica's back.
57	10	"For Sail by Owner"	Paul Michael Glaser	Kim Newton	November 28, 2005	11.35
Following Monica's sudden death, Danny becomes the main suspect. Ed and Casey Manning arrive at the Montecito for a hostile takeover, but it appears that Monica's will leaves Montecito to the Foundation for the Blind. Mike is assaulted in the stairway after breaking up a fight, which leaves Danny, Ed and even Mary to find out who could do something like that to Mike. Ed acts as executor of Monica's will, taking care of final details.
58	11	"Down & Dirty"	Robert Duncan McNeill	Matthew Miller	December 5, 2005	12.61
A televised national poker tour comes to the Montecito. At the same time, Casey, not knowing what APAC means, lets the Porn industry host a convention at the Montecito. To make up for this bad publicity, Casey orders a commercial to be done at the Montecito with Ed as the face of the casino.
59	12	"Bait and Switch"	Adrienne Carter	Tiffany Anderson	January 2, 2006	11.50
Real diamonds get stolen from the pool at Montecito when Lil' Flip is shooting a music video. Metro cannot be called in due to the jeweler's special request, and investigation proves difficult. A guy plays suspiciously good at the craps table, claiming to have a gift to be able to win when he wants. Ed and Mike want to get to the bottom of his true gift. Mike appears to be a male stripper with quite a package, if one is to believe the flyers that are floating around at the casino.
60	13	"The Bitch Is Back"	Tawnia McKiernan	Vanessa Reisen	January 9, 2006	12.27
Monica's old suite seems to be haunted, causing troubles with the new residents. Sam makes a bet with Paul Logan, a rival casino host – who is the best casino host/hostess? Delinda faces a problem with the health inspector at Mystique. Meanwhile, Mary decides to take advantage of the ghost situation and starts a "Haunted Montecito Tour."
61	14	"And Here's Mike with the Weather"	Steven DePaul	Matt Pyken	January 23, 2006	10.86
Almost three million dollars have disappeared from Montecito. The gaming commission has to clear Casey's licence and the missing money becomes an issue. Despite being dead, it seems Monica still gets Montecito in troubles. A live weather report is to be aired from inside the casino, when the weatherman gets an allergic reaction, allowing Mike to take his place for one night. Danny and Mike are to find the missing millions, and identify the thief, no matter if the thief is dead or not.
62	15	"Urban Legends"	David Solomon	Gary Scott Thompson	February 6, 2006	11.80
An urban legend becomes true when Danny finds a guest in an ice filled bathtub missing a kidney. To avoid bad press, the lawyers want to pay him for his silence, but Danny and Mike have other plans and start to investigate a possible scam. Ed helps Sam treat a whale who suffers from really sweaty hands and is starting to scare the other guests away. Jimmie Johnson comes over to the Montecito to be the final judge of a car convention, in which Delinda is participating.
63	16	"Coyote Ugly"	Jeff Woolnough	Kim Newton	March 3, 2006	11.03
Monica's friend Norma discovers a finger in the Montecito's buffet bounty. She doesn't want to sue, but she does want Danny. Meanwhile, Ed and Danny investigate the appearance of the digit. Sam runs afoul of a tough customer.
64	17	"Lyle & Substance"	Félix Enríquez Alcalá	Gardner Stern	March 10, 2006	9.22
A chip thief who was caught by Mike and Danny claims that he met somebody who wants to blow up the Montecito. Wolfgang Puck and Gunther are having a cook-off. Sam hears about a masseur at the Montecito who offers "special treatments."
65	18	"Like a Virgin"	Mel Damski	Vanessa Reisen	March 17, 2006	10.12
Mary is planning an expensive wedding for one of Sam's biggest clients. Mike and Danny investigate card counters. Mike tries to hook up with a sexy hotel customer, in town for the Born-Again Virgins convention.
66	19	"Cash Springs Eternal"	Jeff Woolnough	Adrienne Carter	March 31, 2006	9.33
Danny and Mike probe serial robberies in the casino's residential suites and also find time to serve as models for a charity calendar. Meanwhile, Jillian is alarmed when she discovers her marriage to Ed may have adversely affected Delinda. Mary deals with a hard-to-please magazine layout photographer.
67	20	"All Quiet on the Montecito Front"	Milan Cheylov	Matthew Miller	April 7, 2006	8.52
Romance begins to bloom between Danny and Delinda, to their utmost surprise. Jillian flies in Delinda's old college flame, Dr. Derek Stephenson (Shawn Christian). Casey organizes a paintball retreat for the department heads as a teamwork-building exercise.
68	21	"Chaos Theory"	David Solomon	Gardner Stern	April 28, 2006	8.29
Ed and Jillian go to a spa, only to be interrupted by an emergency at the Montecito. Danny and Mike are suspicious about one of Sam's whales. Derek and Delinda are getting serious.
69	22	"Fidelity, Security, Delivery"	David Straiton	Matt Pyken	May 5, 2006	8.59
Excitement's in the air at the Montecito when Olympic athlete Sasha Cohen stops by. Delinda gives Derek an answer to his marriage proposal. Sam's whales, in the form of a married couple, enlist Danny and Mike to investigate whether their spouses are cheating. Sam spends a romantic weekend at Ed's secluded cabin in the mountains with Woody Hoyt (Jerry O'Connell) from Crossing Jordan.
70	23	"Father of the Bride"	Gary Scott Thompson	Gary Scott Thompson	May 12, 2006	9.76
In the final episode of the series' third season, old romantic feelings resurface as Delinda prepares to get married. Bachelor and bachelorette parties are being planned. Ed's CIA past comes back to haunt him. Jerry O'Connell guest stars as Woody Hoyt from Crossing Jordan.

=== Season 4 (2006–07) ===
No. overall	No. in season	Title	Directed by	Written by	Original release date	U.S. viewers (millions)
71	1	"Father of the Bride Redux"	David Solomon & Gary Scott Thompson	Matt Pyken & Gary Scott Thompson	October 27, 2006	9.33
Delinda must face her fiancé Derek and tell him about her feelings for Danny. Everyone is shocked by Ed's attack. When a whale refuses to leave a villa in the Montecito's Hawaiian resort, Sam has to head out there to take care of it.
72	2	"Died in Plain Sight"	David Solomon	Matt Pyken	November 3, 2006	8.96
Ed reveals surprising news from the past when he gets back from Morocco. Mike goes to Hawaii to help Sam with her problem. Mary is upset about Danny and Delinda's relationship being kept secret from her.
73	3	"The Story of Owe"	Milan Cheylov	Gardner Stern	November 10, 2006	8.37
Sam is trying to track down some of her recent clients who stiffed the Montecito, with the assistance of an old associate of Ed's. Mary tries to conquer one of her biggest fears. Danny and Delinda talk about moving in together.
74	4	"History of Violins"	Jefery Levy	Kim Newton	November 17, 2006	9.04
Jordan Cavanaugh and Woody Hoyt (from Crossing Jordan) are in Las Vegas to investigate the murder of a violinist and the disappearance of his Stradivarius. The Montecito's safe-deposit vault is being robbed, with Lawrence Taylor's Super Bowl XXI ring among the stolen items.
75	5	"Delinda's Box"	David Solomon	Mark Cullen & Robb Cullen	December 1, 2006	10.16
76	6	"Delinda's Box"	David Straiton	Mark Cullen & Robb Cullen	December 1, 2006	10.16
A criminal mastermind (Christopher McDonald) kidnaps Delinda and has her buried alive in a box. The kidnapper gives Ed 12 hours to heist $50 million from the Montecito or Delinda will suffocate. Mary's choice for a new casino mascot proves to be more than the staff and the hotel guests can endure. Ed and Danny work together to rescue Delinda. Mike and Sam are dealing with a Buddhist monk who seems to be winning too much. Mary fills in where needed as there's a flu epidemic hitting the hotel. Danny uses his skills acquired as a US Marine to rescue Delinda from her captors.
77	7	"Meatball Montecito"	LeVar Burton	Matthew Miller	December 8, 2006	9.81
A mobster purchases a Montecito $1 million wedding package, which includes a fully catered wedding, a Harry Winston engagement ring, luxury treatment, and Wayne Newton. Difficulties arise because there are problems between Ed and Wayne Newton. Meanwhile somebody has stolen diamonds and it's difficult finding the thief because so many mafia members are attending the wedding. Danny and Delinda find out that living together is more challenging than they anticipated.
78	8	"White Christmas"	Gary Scott Thompson	Gary Scott Thompson	December 15, 2006	8.40
It's Christmas and Ed's Secret Santa gift exchange proves difficult and surprising for the gifters and the recipients. Meanwhile, Danny's car, his most valuable possession from his mother, is stolen on Christmas Eve. Delinda goes all out in planning her first Christmas Eve with Danny. Sam gets an autographed photo of Elvis during one of his first concerts as a surprise for one of her favorite "whales".
79	9	"Wines and Misdemeanors"	Paul Michael Glaser	Jill Cargerman	January 5, 2007	9.56
A rare bottle of wine is found in the cellar of the Montecito, and Ed decides to auction it off. However, after a case has been bought by one of Sam's whales, the wine is discovered to be fake. Ed, Danny and Mike must find the authentic wine before the press finds out what happened. Meanwhile, Mike has to deal with the senior citizens' convention, specifically the senior women who decide to frolic around Bella Petto – the Montecito's topless pool. Delinda is having a lot of fun with a new sex toy, the Frisky Ferret, much to Danny's dismay.
80	10	"Fleeting Cheating Meeting"	Allison Liddi-Brown	Gardner Stern	January 12, 2007	8.63
Nicole, one of Ed's former employees, comes to the Montecito for her first wedding anniversary with her husband Ollie (Judd Nelson). Ed becomes suspicious of him and makes Mike and Danny watch him. Mary and Sam start fighting as they can't decide which guests are more important to see "OK GO." Danny and Delinda agree to buy out their partners on the property that their tenant burnt to the ground.
81	11	"Wagers of Sin"	Milan Cheylov	Matt Pyken	January 19, 2007	8.55
Ed, Danny, and Mike make a bet on who's the best security operative among them and who can find the Montecito's biggest source of loss within a 24-hour period. Sam tries to help newly honored hotel manicurist Polly win her boyfriend back. Mary tries to sell the last residential suite, and she hopes that a special performance by John Legend will be a success for the Montecito.
82	12	"The Chicken is Making My Back Hurt"	Steven DePaul	Mark Cullen & Robb Cullen	February 2, 2007	9.52
Sam attempts to save Mary from an NBA star with a secret. Mike falls victim to bank robbers, the stolen money is recovered by a bull on the loose. Delinda tries and fails to make "progress" by feeding Las Vegas's homeless population. Danny intercepts a high-stakes game of Russian roulette involving an old war buddy.
83	13	"Pharaoh 'Nuff"	David Straiton	Matthew Miller	February 9, 2007	9.15
An Egyptian mummy is stolen before it can reach the Montecito and Ed, Mike, Danny, and Delinda set up covert operations to recover it. Mary has to deal with an annual guest who is allegedly stealing Montecito room amenities.
84	14	"The Burning Bedouin"	Jefery Levy	Kim Newton	February 16, 2007	8.09
Ed's less than helpful housekeeper won't let him out of bed after he injures his back. Danny gets exceptionally jealous when one of Sam's whales from Qatar, who already has three wives, takes an interest in Delinda. However, after he is discovered dead and on fire in his room, investigation ensues.
85	15	"Bare Chested in the Park"	David Solomon	Matthew Miller	February 23, 2007	8.35
Casey Manning's death puts a damper on the Annual Montecito corporate picnic, which includes competitions between Front of House vs. Back of House. Ed and the Head of Maintenance wager a deal for the winners. The Montecito acquires a new owner.
86	16	"Junk in the Trunk"	Bethany Rooney	Mark Cullen & Robb Cullen	March 2, 2007	8.04
Sam hooks the ultimate whale who falls in love with her, and proposes. However after a generous inheritance turns into a serious debt problem, she decides to pursue the offer only to be drugged, tied up and gagged with duct tape, and locked up in a trunk. Mary's father is found "not guilty". Delinda finds herself at gunpoint after Danny upsets a ganglord calling in his favor.
87	17	"Heroes"	David Solomon	Gary Scott Thompson	March 9, 2007	9.24
Mike discovers that Sam has been kidnapped. Delinda discovers that she is pregnant. Sam awakes from being drugged, in a trunk, removes the gag, and tries to call for help, but Vince comes in at the last second and he gags her once more as he checks out with her back in the trunk. Danny goes out of his way to help stop a friend from being sent to Iraq, who later sets off a bomb in The Montecito while it is being robbed. Mary, affected by her father's acquittal, decides to take matters in her own hands. Ed and Danny, unbeknownst to each other, come to her rescue. Note: These are the last appearances of James Caan as Ed Deline; and Nikki Cox as Mary Connell as series regulars.

=== Season 5 (2007–08) ===
No. overall	No. in season	Title	Directed by	Written by	Original release date	U.S. viewers (millions)
88	1	"A Hero Ain't Nothing But A Sandwich"	Robert Duncan McNeill	Gary Scott Thompson	September 28, 2007	9.28
The Montecito staff members along with the Las Vegas police have their hands full as they try to discover who killed Mary's father while investigating the recent hotel robbery. Mitch and Mike set out to prove there must be another suspect for the murder of Mary's father. Delinda reveals her pregnancy. Sam survives her kidnapping, but loses the Montecito as a mysterious cowboy pays the tax debts and becomes the new owner. Ed Deline does a disappearing act. Note: These are the final appearances of James Caan as Ed Deline; and Nikki Cox as Mary Connell.
89	2	"Shrink Rap"	Timothy Busfield	Matt Pyken	September 28, 2007	9.28
The new owner of the Montecito, A.J. Cooper (Tom Selleck), introduces himself to the staff and brings a new campaign with him: "Anything Can Happen." The staff get worried that people might get fired. Sam is seeing a psychiatrist because of her recent abduction, but she won't open up to him. Instead, she tells him everything about her colleagues.
90	3	"The Glass Is Always Cleaner"	Milan Cheylov	Kim Newton	October 5, 2007	7.48
Cooper is looking for a new President of Operations, and both Danny and Mike apply for the job. The Montecito's new concierge, Piper, appears, while Sam finds her way back to another therapy session. Delinda feels the pangs of motherhood as she gains unwanted weight. A pair of window washers get the attention of the women. Mike's thinking of leaving Las Vegas for a new start in his life if all does not go his way.
91	4	"Head Games"	Timothy Busfield	Jill Cargerman	October 12, 2007	7.16
Cooper is able to get the Pacific Tropic Spokesmodel Search Contest to be held at the Montecito, but things don't go as planned when some of the contestants are sabotaged. Mike attempts to look for the person behind the sabotage, but he is distracted by the beautiful women he's assigned to protect. Sam witnesses a guest murder a woman, but has trouble convincing Danny that it really happened. As Danny assumes his new position as President of the Montecito, Delinda feels rejected by him.
92	5	"Run, Cooper, Run!"	David Straiton	Rob Wright	October 19, 2007	7.66
Danny and Mike are called to the rescue to solve a murder that occurred in Cooper's suite, while Cooper claims that he can't remember what happened. Piper has been paid by Sam to spruce up a young man on his Bar Mitzvah, transforming him from nerd to man. Other staff members agree to participate in a parenting test for Danny and Delinda.
93	6	"When Life Gives You Lemon Bars"	John Badham	Nikki Toscano	October 26, 2007	8.23
In the spirit of Halloween, Piper dresses up in various costumes to try and scare her fellow staffers. Cooper insists on shadowing Sam for the day while she is trying to lure a new whale to the casino, but only scares the client away. In order to make it up to Sam, Cooper agrees to let her play in his annual exclusive poker game with his billionaire friends Roger and Larry (Roger E. Mosley and Larry Manetti from Magnum, P.I. fame). Delinda discovers a wonderful new pastry chef that is sweet on the surface, but after a few days of her sour attitude, she's ready to fire her. Mike thinks he has found the woman of his dreams, but has reservations about them being together, after discovering her past.
94	7	"Adventures in the Skin Trade"	Paul Michael Glaser	Vince McKewin	November 2, 2007	7.50
After Danny and Mike see a strip club owner get physical with a stripper, Delinda begins a city-wide media campaign for rights for exotic dancers, who go on strike, affecting the entire tourist trade in Las Vegas. Danny needs some credibility, who gains it with the assistance of Cooper, revealing a possible agenda of his own. Sam, while in the midst of doing a favor for Piper, asks one of her in return.
95	8	"It's Not Easy Being Green" (Note: The episode is part of NBC's week-long "Green is Universal" campaign.)	Félix Enríquez Alcalá	Jill Cargerman	November 9, 2007	7.01
The Montecito hosts an environmentally friendly conference, making Delinda realize everyone should do their part to protect Mother Earth. Cooper deals with an attractive adversary who's competing for the same business deal. Sam is told her percentages are down and proceeds to find a new way to "attract" whales.
96	9	"My Uncle's a Gas"	James Whitmore, Jr.	Steve Blackman	November 16, 2007	6.72
Danny is finding his new job as President of Operations a bit challenging as his Uncle Luke comes back into town after a 25-year absence. Mike keeps an extra eye on a competition in the casino that Cooper insists Sam help with. The Montecito is in the process of being robbed.
97	10	"The High Price of Gas"	James Whitmore, Jr.	Matt Pyken	November 30, 2007	7.34
The effects of the Montecito robbery are being felt all over Las Vegas, and all the clues seem to be pointing to Danny's uncle. Danny and Mike take it upon themselves to go after the thief. After firing Sam, Cooper has her blacklisted.
98	11	"A Cannon Carol"	Peter Weller	Rob Wright	December 7, 2007 (Note: The episode was shown out of order from what was originally planned due to the 2007–2008 Writers Guild of America strike.)	6.83
Everyone seems to be in the holiday spirit except for Mike who questions his place in Sin City and has an A Christmas Carol experience. Sam invites a whale to visit the casino for the holidays. Delinda and Piper plan a "Hot Santa" contest to win the casino charity competition. Mike tells Danny to take time off to spend Christmas with Delinda.
99	12	"I Could Eat a Horse"	Milan Cheylov	Kim Newton	January 4, 2008	7.08
Mike and Danny travel to Wyoming to buy a horse for Cooper. Piper's past love arrives at the Montecito. Sam deals with a cheating husband. Delinda needs to find a new chef. This episode was filmed to air before A Cannon Carol as evidenced by Delinda's pregnancy progress.
100	13	"Three Babes, 100 Guns and a Fat Chick"	Gary Scott Thompson	Gary Scott Thompson	January 11, 2008	7.06
In the 100th episode, a fugitive is on the run and has been tracked to the Montecito where Danny, Mike and Cooper get involved trying to capture the suspect before three bounty hunters can. Among the bounty hunters that the FBI has trailing them is a gorgeous woman who used to be one of Danny's sergeants in Iraq, causing Delinda's ego to suffer. Piper bounces Delinda out of the pool. One of Sam's whales has lost his family in a random act of violence causing Sam to figure out a way to help him.
101	14	"Secrets, Lies and Lamaze"	John Badham	Steve Blackman	January 18, 2008	6.45
When Piper gets into trouble with the gaming commission, Cooper bails her out because of a promise made to her father, something unknown to the staff. Danny and Delinda take on parenting class.
102	15	"Guess Who's Coming to Breakfast"	Bethany Rooney	Kevin A. Garnett	January 25, 2008	6.67
Sam is busy protecting her whales with the help of "The Cleaner." Delinda throws an unusual party. Cooper challenges Danny to bring in more people. Mike and Piper fall for an old trick while trying to recruit a new bartender.
103	16	"2 on 2"	David Straiton	Vince McKewin	February 1, 2008	6.86
Mike and Danny are involved in a local 2-on-2 basketball tournament, but the losers end up dead. Mike gets a little friendly pressure from Piper to consummate their secret marriage. Piper needs help in becoming "Concierge of the Year."
104	17	"Win, Place, Bingo"	Steve Robman	Story by : Leslie N. Johnson & Erika A. Schleich; Teleplay by : Vince McKewin	February 8, 2008	7.39
Cooper is on the trail of someone he feels is cheating, a guest who is betting on horses and appears to have a perfect winning streak. Mike convinces Danny that he needs to do a "dry run" to the hospital in anticipation of the baby coming. Sam deals with one of her whales who has brought his grandmother with him.
105	18	"Three Weddings and a Funeral (Part 1)" (Note: This episode was originally broadcast as a two-hour block, which NBC titled "Three Weddings and a Funeral". However, in syndication, part one of the episode is titled "High Steaks"^{Archived October 9, 2009, at the Wayback Machine}.)	Bill L. Norton	Jill Cargerman & Rob Wright	February 15, 2008	7.98
The surveillance room is taken hostage during a postage stamp auction. Delinda and Cooper have an unusual dinner date. One of Sam's whales gives her a $50,000 chip as a tip.
106	19	"Three Weddings and a Funeral (Part 2)"	Paul Lazarus	Matt Pyken	February 15, 2008	7.98
Mike's mother finds out about his marriage to Piper and is upset, prompting Mike to put together a wedding ceremony, which in turn prompts Danny to formally propose to Delinda. Casey's little brother Vic shows up with plans to take ownership of the Montecito. Delinda's mother also arrives at the casino. A pair of pre-wedding night parties cause chaos. A plane crash could be the end for Cooper.
