= Fabulous Five =

The Fabulous Five may refer to:

- Fabulous Five Inc., a Jamaican reggae band
- The Fabulous Five (book series), by Betsy Haynes
- Fabulous 5, a 1970s New York City graffiti crew including Fab Five Freddy and Lee Quiñones
- Fabulous Five, nickname of the 1947–48 Kentucky Wildcats men's basketball team
- Fabulous Five, nickname of the Iowa Hawkeyes men's basketball team in the 1950s
- Fabulous Five, the name of pulp magazine hero Doc Savage's aides

== See also ==
- Fab Five (disambiguation)
