= Taffy Sinclair =

Taffy Sinclair may refer to:

- Dr Taffy Sinclair, a character in The Metatemporal Detective by Michael Moorcock
- Taffy Sinclair, a character in The Fabulous Five and other works by Betsy Haynes
