= Bonnie Bryant =

American writer

Barbara "Bonnie" Bryant Hiller (née Bryant; born in New York, New York, in 1946) is an American author; as Bonnie Bryant she wrote many children's and young adult books; she is best known for writing the intermediate horse book series The Saddle Club, which was published by Bantam Books from October 1988 until November 2001. She also wrote as B.B. Hiller.

== The Saddle Club ==
The Saddle Club chronicles the adventures of thirteen-year-old Lisa Atwood and twelve-year-olds Stephanie "Stevie" Lake and Carole Hanson, who live and ride horses in the fictional town of Willow Creek, Virginia. The series was static in time; the girls never aged in 101 books, 7 special editions, and 3 Inside Stories.

In the newsletter sent to fan club members, Bryant explains that she "wrote the first Saddle Club book in 1986. It came about from a suggestion made by an editor at Bantam. Her name is Judy (recognize the name?). She knew there were a lot of horse-crazy readers who hadn't had any new books in a long time. She also knew how interested I was in horses. She decided to bring us together. That's how The Saddle Club was born. At first, there were only going to be four books, but so many of you read them that I just had to do more. Right now, we're planning up through Number 52!" The Saddle Club books were Bryant's first books for Bantam-Skylark.

For a complete list of titles, see this list.

== Pony Tails ==
Pony Tails is the first spin-off series authored by Bryant. It is aimed at beginning readers and follows the lives of eight-year-olds May Grover, Corinne "Corey" Takamura, and Jasmine James, who also ride at Pine Hollow. The first book was published in July 1995, and the last was published in February 1998.

Robert Brown and Fredericka Ribes provided the cover art for the Pony Tails books, and Marcy Ramsey provided the interior art for the books.

For a complete list of titles, see this list.

== Pine Hollow ==
Pine Hollow is the second spin-off series written by Bryant. It is aimed at young adult readers and features Carole, Lisa, Stevie, and some new friends in a series set four years after the events of The Saddle Club. Unlike The Saddle Club, Pine Hollow conformed to a realistic timeline. The series took place over the span of less than a year. The "Pine Hollow" series focuses on The Saddle Club's teenage years.

The first book was published in July 1998, and Full Gallop, the seventeenth and last book, was published in April 2001. Although the last few Saddle Club books were published after Full Gallop, it is the last book set chronologically in the Willow Creek universe.

For a complete list of titles, see this list.

== Television series ==
In 2001, a television show called The Saddle Club, based on the books, was filmed in Australia. As of November 2010, three seasons have aired.

== Ghostwriting ==
Like many long-running children's book series, eventually The Saddle Club was taken over by a team of ghostwriters. Bryant wrote at least one hundred and one The Saddle Club books, six Pony Tails books, and two Pine Hollow books herself. Ghostwriters for the Saddle Club and Pine Hollow books included Caitlin Macy (sometimes credited as Caitlin C. Macy), Catherine Hapka, Sallie Bissell, Kimberly Brubaker Bradley, Helen Geraghty, Tina deVaron, Cat Johnston, Minna Jung and Sheila Prescott-Vessey.

== Other books ==
Bonnie Bryant is also the author of many novelizations of movies, including Teenage Mutant Ninja Turtles, The Karate Kid (and all of its sequels), Bingo and Honey, I Blew Up the Kid, written under her married name, B.B. Hiller. Also, the novelization of Superman IV: The Quest for Peace.

Bryant collaborated in the ghostwriting of The Baby-sitters Club Super Special #14: BSC in the USA, published under the name of its creator, Ann M. Martin.

== Personal life ==
Bonnie Bryant was born to Emmons and Metzer S. "Mary" Bryant, who are now deceased. Bryant was born raised in New York City, then moved to Wisconsin to go to Lawrence University, where she met her husband, Neil W. Hiller. Bryant worked on the campus newspaper, where Hiller was the editor.

After college, Bryant worked for a publishing company, then left in 1986 to write full-time. She and Hiller had two sons, Emmons and Andrew "Andy" Hiller. Neil Hiller died in 1989. Many of Bonnie's books are dedicated to him. She dated Irving Gottesman for about 7 years from 2000 to 2007, until his unfortunate death from cancer September 21, 2007. He had, from a previous marriage, two children named Max and Alice Gottesman.

Bryant has two sisters, Penelope "Penny" Bryant Carey, and Molly Bryant, now deceased. Bryant now lives in Greenwich Village, New York.
