= Andrew Bowen =

American actor

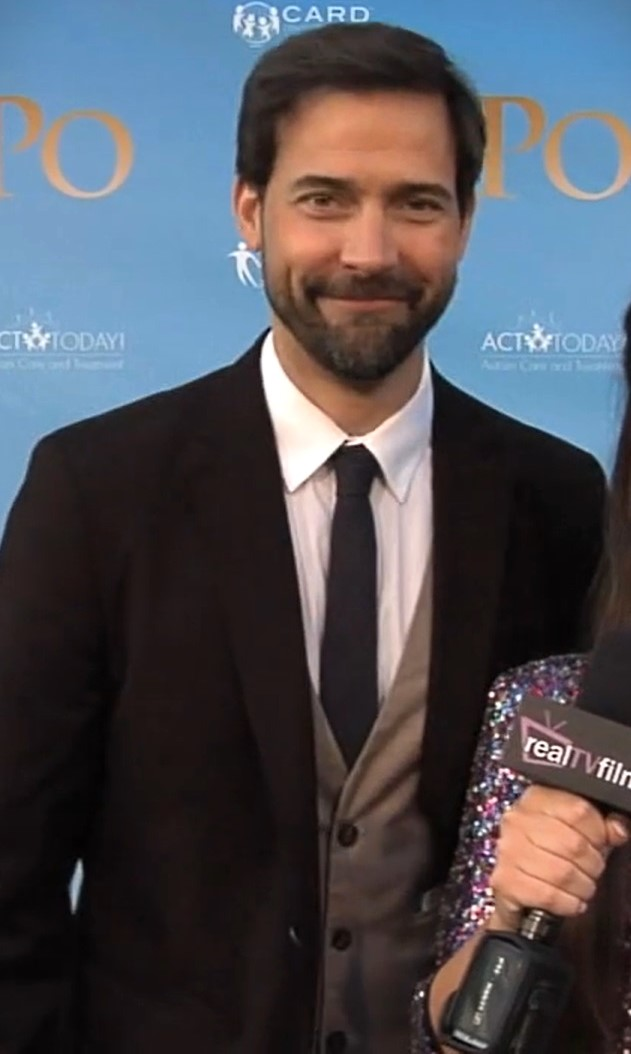
- Bowen in 2016
- Born: Boston, Massachusetts, U.S.
- Occupations: Actor, comedian
- Years active: 1992–present
- Spouse: Renee Bowen
- Children: 3

Andrew Bowen is an American actor and comedian. He was a cast member on MADtv and voices Johnny Cage in the Mortal Kombat universe.

== Life ==
Bowen was born in Boston and raised in Vermont. After watching the film Grease at the age of six, he told his parents that he wanted to be "like John Travolta when he grew up". His mother considered enrolling him in dance class, but decided against it. The following year, he performed as the lead in his first play titled Once Upon a Rhyme. He continued studying ballet and modern jazz for eight years and was involved in local theater throughout high school.

Bowen's family later relocated to New Jersey, where his grandmother's house was used as a filming location, an opportunity that helped him secure a talent agent. During the summer following his high school graduation, Bowen acquired an agent in New York City, then moved to Los Angeles at age 19 to pursue acting. His first film role would have been as Kathryn Erbe's love interest in What About Bob? (1991). He received a letter from director Frank Oz before the film's release informing him that his role had ended up on the cutting room floor. He worked in various part-time jobs, such as commercials and small roles on television, while also taking screenwriting courses at the University of Southern California.

A father of three, Bowen is a devoted family man. His son, Seth Lucas Bowen appeared in an episode of CBS series Bad Teacher.

== Career ==
In 1995, Bowen was hired to play the lead role in Fox Hunt, a live-action interactive video game from Capcom. His character, Jack Fremont, is a comedic twist on a "James Bond" type of character. Fox Hunt was later developed as a potential television series. Bowen's performance in the game was also noticed by executives at Warner Bros., who signed him to a talent development deal.

While waiting for the Fox Hunt pilot to be filmed, Bowen wrote, directed, and financed a short film called Lone Defender. The film was intended as an audition for the role of Peter Parker in a Spider-Man movie that James Cameron was slated to direct. The Spider-Man production encountered legal problems by the time Bowen finished Lone Defender, but the process of making it had catalyzed Bowen's desire to direct films. He quickly wrote a spec script for a film called Along the Way and began looking for a producer.

Bowen eventually filmed the pilot for Fox Hunt, but the show was not picked up. Instead, he joined the cast of Fox's MADtv later that year and was quickly called one of the new talents to watch by TV Guide. Despite his success, Bowen left the show after one season, and with the help of his father he raised enough money to start principal photography for Along the Way (aka The Haven]. He gained over 40 pounds in order to play the hulking character "Jocko" in the film. Scott Weinberg wrote, "Andrew Bowen (formerly of the underrated MADtv) is stunningly strong as Jocko, creating a character that on the surface seems like little more than an affable giant, yet the actor brings a fierce sense of loyalty, a goofy sense of humor, and an overall air of desperate sadness to this role. He delivers easily one of the best 'unknown' performances I've seen in years."

While Bowen raised the money he couldn't finish his film, he continued acting, landing recurring roles on ER and Reno 911! as well as guest roles on programs such as CSI: NY, Las Vegas, JAG, Charmed. He also appeared in movies such as Ivan Reitman's Evolution (2001) and starred in several television pilots, including Breadwinners for producers Gale Anne Hurd and Steven Tao. In addition, Bowen has lent his voice to the video games Ice Age: The Meltdown, Rise of Nations, The Matrix: Path of Neo, Mortal Kombat X, Mortal Kombat 11, and others.

He appeared in the critically acclaimed film series The Work and the Glory (Parts II and III), playing Brigham Young, Big Bad Wolf for Universal Studios, and the vampire film Immortally Yours. He also had a small role in the Joss Whedon television series Dollhouse and appeared in Star Stories (the American version of a British comedy series), Conjurer with John Schneider and Maxine Bahns, and the independent feature Butterfly Dreaming for director Rufus Sam Williams. He has also filmed commercials for products including Bud Light, Circuit City, Chrysler, Touchstone Energy Cooperatives, and Diet Coke.

=== Celebrity impressions on Mad TV ===
- Morey Amsterdam
- Yasser Arafat
- Christian Bale
- Garth Brooks
- Nicolas Cage
- Matt Damon
- James Doohan
- Michael Flatley
- Scott Foley
- Donny Osmond
- Bill Paxton
- Brad Pitt
- Jason Priestley
- Keanu Reeves
- Seann William Scott
- Charlie Sheen
- Christian Slater
- Kenneth Starr
- Jean-Claude Van Damme
- Christopher Walken

== Filmography ==
=== Film ===
Year	Title	Role	Notes
1999	The Haunting of Hell House	James Farrow	
2001	Evolution	Road Worker	
2002	American Girl	Short Guard	
2003	Marines	Carlos Guillen	Direct-to-video
2006	Big Bad Wolf	Scott Cowley	
2009	The Pit and the Pendulum	Alan Divay	
2011	Protocol	Agent	
2015	Tooken	Doctor	
2015	Summer Forever	Chris	
2016	Smothered	Carl	
2016	Holidays	Reggie	Segment: "New Year's Eve"
2016	A Boy Called Po	Jack	
2017	The Tribes of Palos Verdes	Jack	

=== Television ===
Year	Title	Role	Notes
1992	Saved by the Bell	Matt Wilson	Episode: "The Senior Prom"
1998–99	Mad TV	Various	25 episodes
1999	Batman Beyond	Rick (voice)	Episode: "Spellbound"
1999–2000	ER	Andrew	3 episodes
2001	Charmed	Male Victim	Episode: "Coyote Piper"
2003	John Doe	Staff Sergeant	Episode: "Illegal Alien"
2003	She Spies	Wade	Episode: "Message from Kassar"
2003	JAG	Lt. Jergensen	Episode: "Pulse Rate"
2003–04	Reno 911!	Redneck	3 episodes
2004	Las Vegas	Eric Bates	Episode: "Degas Away with It"
2005	CSI: NY	Bryce Sweet	Episode: "The Closer"
2009	Dollhouse	Scott	Episode: "Gray Hour"
2010	Cold Case	Lee Mavoides '10	Episode: "Almost Paradise"
2011	Big Time Rush	Blain	Episode: "Big Time Girl Group"
2011–14	The Division	Nick Trever	4 episodes
2012	Magic City	Divin' Dave Donahue	6 episodes
2012	Leverage	Charles Dodgson III	Episode: "The White Rabbit Job"
2013	Criminal Minds	Mark Jackson	Episode: "The Gathering"
2014	Nicky, Ricky, Dicky & Dawn	Rod Dynamite	Episode: "Get Sporty-er!"
2015	Maron	Jib	Episode: "Steel Johnson"
2016	NCIS	Merrick Gomer	Episode: "Love Boat"
2017	NCIS: Los Angeles	Nick	Episode: "Fool Me Twice"
2018	Shameless	Darren	Episode: "Are You There Shim? It's Me, Ian."

=== Video games ===
Year	Title	Role	Notes
1996	Fox Hunt	Jack Fremont	
2005	Jade Empire	Additional voices	
2005	Yakuza	Additional voices	
2005	The Matrix: Path of Neo	Neo	
2006	Ice Age 2: The Meltdown	Additional voices	
2010	Metal Gear Solid: Peace Walker	Soldiers	
2010	Lost Planet 2	Additional voices	
2011	Catherine	Todd Bozeman	Also Full Body
2011	Killzone 3	Sergeant Thomas "Sev" Sevchenko	
2011	Infamous 2	Male pedestrians	
2011	Saints Row: The Third	Josh Birk	
2011	Star Wars: The Old Republic	Doc, additional voices	
2013	Aliens: Colonial Marines	Hudson	
2013	Saints Row IV	Josh Birk / Nyteblade	
2013	Lightning Returns: Final Fantasy XIII	Additional voices	
2014	Murdered: Soul Suspect	Additional voices	
2015	Battlefield Hardline	Additional voices	
2015	Mortal Kombat X	Johnny Cage, Rain, Smoke	
2016	Zero Time Dilemma	Carlos	
2018	Red Dead Redemption 2	The local pedestrian population	
2018	Fallout 76	Billy, Harold Clark	Nuclear Winter DLC
2019	Mortal Kombat 11	Johnny Cage	
2020	Final Fantasy VII Remake	Additional voices	
2020	Yakuza: Like a Dragon	Additional voices	
2023	Mortal Kombat 1	Johnny Cage	
2023	Mortal Kombat: Onslaught	Johnny Cage	
2023	Starfield	Paxton Hull	
TBA	Deadlock	Jacob Lash	
