= Fab Five =

Fab Five may refer to:

== Arts and entertainment ==
- FAB 5, Greek reality TV show
- The Fab Five (film), a 2011 documentary about the 1990s Michigan Wolverines men's basketball players
- Fab Five: The Texas Cheerleader Scandal, a 2008 American teen drama
- The Fab Five: Disney’s Pluto, Goofy, Mickey and Minnie Mouse and Donald Duck.

== People ==
- Fab Five, a nickname of Duran Duran, an English new wave band
- Fab Five Freddy (born 1959), American visual artist and hip hop pioneer
- Fab Five (University of Michigan), the 1991 University of Michigan men's basketball team recruiting class
- Fab Five, later known as the Fierce Five, the United States' artistic gymnastics team at the 2012 Summer Olympics
- Fab Five, hosts of the American reality TV series Queer Eye

== See also ==
- Fab Four (disambiguation)
- Fabulous Five (disambiguation)
- The Famous Five (disambiguation)
