= The Famous Five (disambiguation) =

The Famous Five is a series of novels by Enid Blyton

The Famous Five may also refer to:

== Adaptations of the novel series ==
- Famous Five (film), a 2012 German adaptation
- The Famous Five (1978 TV series), a TV adaptation
- The Famous Five (1995 TV series), another TV adaptation
- The Famous Five (2023 TV series), a TV adaptation
- Famous 5: On the Case, an animated series

== Other uses ==
- The Famous Five (Canada), a group of Canadian women who were proponents in a landmark women's rights case
- The Famous Five (football), a Hibernian Football Club forward line during the late 1940s and early 1950s
- Famous Five (Greyfriars School), schoolfellows of Billy Bunter
- Famous Five, a group of United States Senators honored with their portraits in the United States Senate Reception Room
- Spiro (band), formerly The Famous Five, a music group based in Bristol, England
- The Famous Five, a music group based in Bath, England during the 1980s

== See also ==
- Fab Five (disambiguation)
