= Fab Four (disambiguation) =

The Fab Four was a nickname for the Beatles.

Fab Four may also refer to:

- The Fab Four (tribute), a Beatles tribute band
- The Revols or the Fab Four, a Canadian band formed in 1957
- The Fab 4, a Dell Comics superhero group
- Fab Four, a group of cricketers: Virat Kohli, Joe Root, Kane Williamson, and Steve Smith, coined in 2014 by Martin Crowe

== See also ==
- Fabulous Four (disambiguation)
- The Fab Faux, a Beatles tribute band
- Fab Five (disambiguation)
- Prefab Four (disambiguation)
