= Prefab Four =

Prefab Four was a play on words, a parody of The Beatles' nickname Fab Four, primarily applied to either of two bands:

- The Monkees
- The Rutles
- The Fab Four (tribute), briefly nicknamed the Prefab Four in 2000 and 2008

== See also ==
- Fab Four (disambiguation)
