= Bone Chillers =

1996 American comedy horror television series

- Genre: Comedy horror
- Created by: Adam Rifkin
- Based on: Bone Chillers by Betsy Haynes and Daniel Weiss
- Starring: Linda Cardellini; Saadia Persad; Esteban Powell; John Patrick White; Charles Fleischer
- Theme music composer: David Newman
- Composer: Christopher Hoag
- Country of origin: United States
- Original language: English
- No. of seasons: 1
- No. of episodes: 13

Production
- Executive producers: Fred Silverman; Willard Carroll; Thomas L. Wilthe; Adam Rifkin
- Producers: Corey King; Richard G. King
- Running time: 22 minutes
- Production companies: Hyperion Pictures; The Fred Silverman Company

Original release
- Network: ABC
- Release: September 7 – December 7, 1996

Bone Chillers is a series of children's horror fiction novels and a TV show created and authored by Betsy Haynes. This series is similar in style and tone to Goosebumps. At the end of each television episode, author Betsy Haynes would appear in an educational segment encouraging young viewers to read, write and be creative.

== Synopsis ==
Four freshmen at Edgar Allan Poe High School not only have to deal with the normal pressures of competing with the cool kids and the jocks but also have to contend with all sorts of weird happenings. Similar to Goosebumps, the stories that were originally about different people in each book were all changed to the setting of a haunted high school to provide a continuing cast. Assisting the main characters was Arnie the custodian, who lived in the school's basement. There was the feared cook of the school, Carl, the ditzy Miss Dewberry, and the evil Principal Percival Pussman. Only three episodes of the TV series were adapted from books; the others were all original (although the episode "Romeo and Ghouliette" was later adapted into the 23rd and final entry in the book series).

== Cast ==
=== Main cast ===
- Linda Cardellini as Sarah Moss
- Saadia Persad as Lexi Orwell
- Esteban Powell as Brian Holsapple
- John Patrick White as Fitzgerald Crump
- Charles Fleischer as Arnie

=== Recurring cast ===
- Dave Ruby as Buddy
- Trey Alexander as Kirk
- Danielle Weeks as Tiffany
- Miles Dougal as Carl
- Erick Avari as Dr. Lumbago
- Laraine Newman as Ms. Dewberry
- Arthur Burghardt as Principal Pussman

== Episodes ==
No.	Title	Directed by	Written by	Original release date
1	"Art Intimidates Life"	Rif Coogan	Adam Rifkin	September 7, 1996
Drawing/sketching pictures is no fun anymore when the horror creatures that are being drawn are found in reality.
2	"Teacher Creature"	Rif Coogan	Teleplay by : Alex Zamm; Based on the novel by : Betsy Haynes	September 14, 1996
The new teacher at school, Mr. Batrachian, turns into a frog after he accidentally digests toxic eggs that Fitz and Brian find in the swamp. Based on book #6.
3	"Back to School"	Rif Coogan	Teleplay by : Adam Rifkin; Based on the novel by : Betsy Haynes	September 21, 1996
Hating the disgusting cafeteria food at Edgar Allan Poe High School, Fitz refuses to eat it, even when Miss Webb takes over, and when his voracious classmates start fighting for seconds, he knows something weird is happening. Based on book #3.
4	"Frankenturkey"	Valarie Breiman	Teleplay by : Michael McDowell & Adam Rifkin; Based on the novel by : Betsy Haynes	September 28, 1996
Fitz and Brian are supposed to stuff the school turkey so it will be a good meal for the school's Thanksgiving turkey. They don't want it to suffer, so they develop a decoy that is struck by lightning. It comes to life and becomes Frankenturkey. Fitz, Brian, Sarah, and Lexi try to find a way to outsmart him before he can make a meal out of them. Based on book #4.
5	"Mummy Dearest"	Richard Elfman	Matt Bates & Carl V. Dupré	October 5, 1996
The kids at Edgar Allan Poe High School must face off with a mummy during the school play.
6	"Charlotte's Revenge"	Richard Elfman	Matt Bates & Carl V. Dupré	October 12, 1996
A giant spider terrorizes the students and staff.
7	"Romeo and Ghouliette"	Willard Carroll	Rege Bulman & Clay Eide	October 19, 1996
Lexi knows there's something weird about Julie, the new girl at Edgar Allan Poe High School. Julie was practically drooling over a worm in biology lab. Then Lexi swears she saw Julie snatch a fly out of the air in homeroom and eat it. Julie is now after Lexi's best friend, Fitz, who is totally falling for her. He loves everything about Julie, especially the cookies and candies she brings him. Lexi suspects Julie is fattening Fitz up for a feast. This episode was later adapted into book #23.
8	"Gorilla My Dreams"	Valarie Breiman	Matt Bates & Carl V. Dupré	October 26, 1996
A gorilla is invading the dreams of a High School student.
9.	"Mr. Fitz and Dr. Hyde"	Richard Elfman	Rege Bulman & Clay Eide	November 2, 1996
Fitz is uncontrollably transforming into an insane monster wreaking havoc all over.
10	"Root of All Evil"	Willard Carroll	Michael J. Prescott	November 9, 1996
The students of Edgar Allan Poe High School are battling against plants.
11	"Edgar Allan Poe-Session"	Willard Carroll	Michael J. Prescott and Matt Bates & Carl Dupré	November 16, 1996
The ghost of horror writer Edgar Allan Poe, for whom the school is named, gets angry when the principal gets rid of his bust from the school lobby.
12	"Shmendel's Comet"	Willard Carroll	Adam Rifkin	November 30, 1996
The return of Shmendel's Comet causes strange powers to be released at the school, which cause trouble for Kirk and his friends, who are trying to sneak in to steal the answers to a test.
13	"Full Moon Goon"	Christopher Coppola	Michele Rifkin	December 7, 1996
Sarah has a new friend named Lobo but she does not know that he is a werewolf. Fitz and Brian are suspicious about Lobo's strange behaviour and they discover that Lobo, under a spell, changes into a beast and howls at the Moon on a full moon.

== Development and broadcast history ==
Having witnessed the major success of the Goosebumps series, television executive Fred Silverman went in search of another book series in a similar vein in hopes of rivaling that show's success, eventually coming across Haynes's book series. Noting that one of the books in the series, Back to School, featured a cast of four teens in a haunted high school, he decided that these four would serve as the core of the series; he believed that the format was sure to be "a gargantuan sized hit" that bore similarities to the Scooby-Doo franchise, a series he had originally greenlit in his early career in the late 1960s. Haynes took an active role in the series development, stating that the series "couldn't hurt sales" of the books.

The television series was not a success and was pulled from broadcast midseason, replaced by Nightmare Ned.

== Home media ==
Buena Vista Home Video released six episodes of the series on three VHS cassettes in 1997, after the series had been cancelled.

Name	Release date	Episodes	Format	Notes
Art Imitates Life	August 26, 1997	2	VHS	Includes the episodes "Art Imitates Life" and "Mummy Dearest"
Back to School	August 26, 1997	2	VHS	Includes the episodes "Back to School" and "Teacher Creature"
Frankenturkey	August 26, 1997	2	VHS	Includes the episodes "Frankenturkey" and "Full Moon Goon"

== Book series ==
1. Beware the Shopping Mall: Robin goes on a shopping spree in Wonderland Mall, where the mannequins take over the personalities of her friends and only by being lured out of the mall can the real children reclaim their bodies.
2. Little Pet Shop of Horrors: Cassie discovers that the new pet shop in town turns kids into dogs.
3. Back to School: Fitz thinks that there is something strange about the new school cook when his friends become addicted to the food and gain monstrous appetites.
4. Frankenturkey: A zombified turkey goes after students Kyle and Annie.
5. Strange Brew: Wanting to make her life more interesting, Tori finds a notebook full of spells and runs into trouble when she cannot control the magic.
6. Teacher Creature: Joey and Nate discover that their new science teacher is a mutant frog who likes to eat sixth graders.
7. Frankenturkey II: Frankenturkey returns from the grave after Kyle and Annie make wishes on his wishbone and goes after them again.
8. Welcome to Alien Inn: Stranded at an inn during a blizzard, Matt enjoys the snow and the time off from school until he learns that the innkeeper and all the other guests are aliens who have come to Earth to study human life.
9. Attack of the Killer Ants: Disgusted by the multitude of red ants that threaten the school picnic, Ryan and Alex go on an ant-squashing spree, only to be targeted by a huge, hairy monster of an ant that wants to make the boys into slaves.
10. Slime Time: The mucus from Jeremy's sneeze turns into a blob threatening to eat everyone in town.
11. Toilet Terror (Elizabeth Winfrey): Hans and Ellie do battle against a slimy monster who lives in their toilet.
12. Night of the Living Clay (David Bergantino): Tasha fights back against a band of clay monsters living in the basement of her house.
13. The Thing Under the Bed (Daniel Ehrenhaft): A boy fights back against a creature hiding under his bed.
14. A Terminal Case of the Uglies (David Bergantino): A new school photographer is turning the student body into monsters.
15. Tiki Doll of Doom (Michael Burgan): Lucy gets a tiki doll necklace from her aunt, which has the power to turn her dreams into reality.
16. Queen of the Gargoyles (Gene Hult): During a visit to her aunt's apartment building, Isabella discovers that the gargoyles decorating the place are alive and her aunt may be their queen.
17. Why I Quit the Baby-Sitter's Club (unknown, mistakenly credited to David Bergantino): Rosie, a reluctant young sitter, agrees to sit for her new neighbors, whose "child" is a real monster.
18. blowtorch@psycho.com (Sherry Shahan): Jason's story about a psycho killer known as Blowtorch comes to life the more he saves his story on his computer's hard drive.
19. Night Squawker (Dahlia Kosinski): Paul discovers that his new pet parrot has the power to predict doom.
20. Scare Bear (Gene Hult): Tim throws out his childhood teddy bear who begins to haunt him.
21. The Dog Ate My Homework: Azie Appleton and her friends have the power to make any lie come true, but get in over their heads when they unleash giant termites.
22. Killer Clown of Kings County (Daniel Ehrenhaft): Zeke becomes the assistant to a clown who is a master at dark magic.
23. Romeo and Ghouliette (Ryan Chipman): Lexi suspects a new girl, Julie who ends up becoming a monster—with Lexi's friend Fitz as the main course.

In French, the series is known as "Froid Dans le Dos" (which translates to "Cold in the Back") and follows a different order than the American version. Only fifteen of the original books were published in this line, but the fifteenth book, "Le Homard en Cavale" (which translates to "The Lobster on the Run") seems to be exclusive to this line, as it is about a lobster going after two kids on Christmas, which bears no resemblance to any books in the original English line.
