= Fantastic Four (disambiguation) =

Fantastic Four is a superhero team appearing in American comic books published by Marvel Comics.

Fantastic Four may also refer to:

== Comics ==
- Fantastic Four (comic book)
- Fantastic Four Adventures, the Panini Comics comic that reprints Fantastic Four comics for the UK
- Ultimate Fantastic Four, the Ultimate Marvel comic book variation on the classic team

== Film ==
- Fantastic Four (2005 film), based on the Marvel Comics series, directed by Tim Story
- Fantastic Four: Rise of the Silver Surfer, a 2007 sequel, also directed by Tim Story
- Fantastic Four (2015 film), a franchise reboot, directed by Josh Trank
- The Fantastic Four: First Steps, a 2025 film in the Marvel Cinematic Universe, second reboot, directed by Matt Shakman
- The Fantastic Four (unreleased film), a Roger Corman production completed in 1994, also based on the comic franchise

== Television ==
- The Fantastic Four (1967 TV series), a 1967 animated series based on the comics
- The New Fantastic Four, a 1978 animated series based on the comics, notable for not including the Human Torch
- Fantastic Four (1994 TV series), a 1994 animated series as part of The Marvel Action Hour, also based on the comics
- Fantastic Four: World's Greatest Heroes, a 2006 animated series also based on the comics

== Music ==
- The Fantastic Four (band), an R&B vocal group that recorded for the Motown and Westbound labels, among others, during the 1960s and '70s

== Video games ==
- Fantastic Four (1997 video game), a PlayStation video game based on the comics
- Fantastic Four (2005 video game), from Activision, based on the 2005 film

== See also ==
- Die Fantastischen Vier, a German hip hop group
