= List of Saddle Club books =

This article contains titles of books in the saddle club series. a children's book series authored by Bonnie Bryant, as well as a spin-off series. The books were later adapted into an Australian television series, also titled The Saddle Club.

These books can be read for free on https://openlibrary.org

== The Saddle Club ==
This is a middle-grade series focusing on Carole Hanson, Stevie Lake, and Lisa Atwood.

1. Horse Crazy (6/28/1988)
2. Horse Shy (10/1/1988)
3. Horse Sense (1/1/1989)
4. Horse Power (1/1/1989)
5. Trail Mates (1/1/1989)
6. Dude Ranch (1/1/1989)
7. Horse Play (1/1/1989)
8. Horse Show (12/1/1989)
9. Hoof Beat (1/1/1990)
10. Riding Camp (1/1/1990)
11. Horse Wise (1/1/1990)
12. Rodeo Rider (9/1/1990)
13. Starlight Christmas (10/1/1990)
14. Sea Horse (12/1/1990)
15. Team Play (1/1/1991)
16. Horse Games (1/1/1991)
17. Horsenapped! (1/1/1991)
18. Pack Trip (1/1/1991)
19. Star Rider (1/1/1991)
20. Snow Ride (1/1/1992)
21. Racehorse (1/1/1992)
22. Fox Hunt (1/1/1992)
23. Horse Trouble (1/1/1992)
24. Ghost Rider (1/1/1992)
25. Show Horse (1/1/1992)
26. Beach Ride (1/1/1993)
27. Bridle Path (1/1/1993)
28. Stable Manners (1/1/1993)
29. Ranch Hands (1/1/1993)
30. Autumn Trail (1/1/1993)
31. Hayride (1/1/1993)
32. Chocolate Horse(1/1/1994)
33. High Horse (1/1/1994)
34. Hay Fever (1/1/1994)
35. Horse Tale (1/1/1994)
36. Riding Lesson (1/1/1994)
37. Stage Coach (1/1/1994)
38. Horse Trade(1/1/1994)
39. Purebred (1/1/1994)
40. Gift Horse (1/1/1994)
41. Stable Witch (1/1/1995)
42. Saddlebags (1/1/1995)
43. Photo Finish (1/1/1995)
44. Horseshoe (1/1/1995)
45. Stable Groom (1/1/1995)
46. Flying Horse (1/1/1995)
47. Horse Magic (1/1/1995)
48. Mystery Ride (1/1/1995)
49. Stable Farewell (1/1/1995)
50. Yankee Swap (1/1/1995)
51. Pleasure Horse (1/1/1996)
52. Riding Class (1/1/1996)
53. Horse Sitters (1/1/1996)
54. Gold Medal Rider (1/1/1996)
55. Gold Medal Horse (1/1/1996)
56. Cutting Horse (1/1/1996)
57. Tight Rein (1/1/1996)
58. Wild Horses (1/1/1996)
59. Phantom Horse (1/1/1996)
60. Hobby Horse (1/1/1996)
61. Broken Horse (1/1/1996)
62. Horse Blues (12/1/1996)
63. Stable Hearts (1/1/1997)
64. Horse Capades (2/10/1997)
65. Silver Stirrups (3/10/1997)
66. Saddle Sore (5/12/1997)
67. Summer Horse (6/9/1997)
68. Summer Rider (6/9/1997)
69. Endurance Ride (7/7/1997)
70. Horse Race (8/11/1997)
71. Horse Talk (10/6/1997)
72. Holiday Horse (11/10/1997)
73. Horse Guest (12/1/1997)
74. Horse Whispers (1/9/1998)
75. Painted Horse (2/9/1998)
76. Horse Care (3/3/1998)
77. Rocking Horse (4/6/1998)
78. Horseflies (5/11/1998)
79. English Horse (6/8/1998)
80. English Rider (6/8/1998)
81. Wagon Trail (7/6/1998)
82. Quarter Horse (8/10/1998)
83. Horse Thief (9/8/1998)
84. Schooling Horse (10/13/1998)
85. Horse Fever (12/1/1998)
86. Secret Horse (1/1/1999)
87. Show Jumper (1/1/1999)
88. Sidesaddle (6/8/1999)
89. Lucky Horse (8/10/1999)
90. Driving Team (1/11/2000)
91. Starting Gate (3/1/2000)
92. Million Dollar Horse (5/9/2000)
93. Horse Love (7/11/2000)
94. Horse Spy (9/12/2000)
95. Show Judge (11/14/2000)
96. New Rider (1/9/2001)
97. Hard Hat (3/13/2001)
98. Horse Feathers (5/8/2001)
99. Trail Ride (7/10/2001)
100. Stray Horse (9/11/2001)
101. Best Friends (11/13/2001)

=== Saddle Club Super Editions ===
1. A Summer Without Horses (1/1/1994)
2. The Secret of the Stallion (1/1/1995)
3. Western Star (1/1/1995)
4. Dream Horse (1/1/1996)
5. Before They Rode Horses (4/7/1997)
6. Nightmare (9/8/1997)
7. Christmas Treasures (11/10/1998)

=== Inside Stories ===
- Stevie: The Inside Story (1/12/1999)
- Lisa: The Inside Story (6/8/1999)
- Carole: The Inside Story (10/12/1999)

=== Peripherals ===
- Just For Girls: The Saddle Club: Happy Horse Day (1/1/1990)

This book also included a short story in the Fabulous Five series by Betsy Haynes.

== Pony Tails ==
The first spin-off is a series of chapter books focusing on May Grover, Jasmine James, and Corey Takamura.

1. Pony Crazy (6/1/1995)
2. May's Riding Lesson (6/1/1995)
3. Corey's Pony Is Missing (8/1/1995)
4. Jasmine's Christmas Ride (10/1/1995)
5. May Takes the Lead (12/1/1995)
6. Corey in the Saddle (2/1/1996)
7. Jasmine Trots Ahead (4/1/1996)
8. May Rides a New Pony (6/1/1996)
9. Corey and the Spooky Pony (8/5/1996)
10. Jasmine Helps a Foal (10/1/1996)
11. May Goes to England (4/7/1997)
12. Corey's Secret Friend (5/12/1997)
13. Jasmine's First Horse Show (7/7/1997)
14. May's Runaway Ride (9/8/1997)
15. Corey's Christmas Wish (11/10/1997)
16. Jasmine and the Jumping Pony (1/12/1998)

== Pine Hollow ==
The second spin-off is a series of young adult books focusing on Carole Hanson, Stevie Lake, and Lisa Atwood approximately four years after the events of The Saddle Club series.

1. The Long Ride (7/6/1998)
2. The Trail Home (9/8/1998)
3. Reining In (11/10/1998)
4. Changing Leads (1/12/1999)
5. Conformation Faults (1/5/1999)
6. Shying at Trouble (1/12/1999)
7. Penalty Points (7/13/1999)
8. Course of Action(9/7/1999)
9. Riding to Win (11/9/1999)
10. Ground Training (2/1/2000)
11. Cross Ties (4/11/2000)
12. Back In The Saddle (6/13/2000)
13. High Stakes (8/8/2000)
14. Headstrong (10/10/2000)
15. Setting the Pace (12/12/2000)
16. Track Record (2/13/2001)
17. Full Gallop (4/10/2001)
