= Las Vegas (TV series) =

American comedy-drama television series (2003–2008)

- Genre: Comedy drama
- Created by: Gary Scott Thompson
- Starring: James Caan; Josh Duhamel; Nikki Cox; James Lesure; Vanessa Marcil; Molly Sims; Marsha Thomason; Tom Selleck
- Opening theme: "A Little Less Conversation" by Elvis Presley on American TV broadcasts ("Let It Ride" by Charlie Clouser was used in international and DVD versions)
- Composer: Charlie Clouser
- Country of origin: United States
- Original language: English
- No. of seasons: 5
- No. of episodes: 106 (list of episodes)

Production
- Executive producers: Gary Scott Thompson; Justin Falvey; Darryl Frank; Matt Pyken; Gardner Stern; Kim Newton; Scott Steindorff
- Producers: Stephen Sassen; Jill Cargerman; Daniel Arkin; Howard Grigsby
- Running time: 40–43 minutes
- Production companies: Gary Scott Thompson Productions; DreamWorks Television; NBC Studios (season 1); NBC Universal Television Studio (seasons 2–5); Universal Media Studios (season 5)

Original release
- Network: NBC
- Release: September 22, 2003 – February 15, 2008

Related
- Crossing Jordan

Las Vegas is an American comedy-drama television series created by Gary Scott Thompson. It was broadcast by NBC from September 22, 2003, through February 15, 2008, airing for five seasons. It focuses on a team of people working at the Montecito, a fictional hotel and casino on the Las Vegas Strip. The employees deal with various issues that arise within the working environment, ranging from casino security to restaurant management and valet parking. Las Vegas starred James Caan, Josh Duhamel, Nikki Cox, James Lesure, Vanessa Marcil, Molly Sims, Marsha Thomason, and eventually Tom Selleck. The series originally centered on Ed Deline (Caan), a strict ex-CIA officer who serves as the president of operations for the Montecito. Former Marine Counterintelligence/HUMINT (CI/HUMINT) officer, Danny McCoy (Duhamel), who is Ed's protégé, later becomes the Montecito's new president.

The pilot episode began filming in March 2003, and was produced for $5 million, making it the most expensive pilot in NBC history. Production for a full season began later that year. Much of the series filming occurred at Culver Studios in California, where a set was constructed to represent the Montecito. Some filming also occasionally took place in Las Vegas. The Mandalay Bay and Green Valley Ranch, two hotel-casinos in the Las Vegas Valley, were sometimes used to portray the Montecito.

Las Vegas marked Caan's first starring role in a television series. Thomason left the series after the second season to pursue other projects, and Caan and Cox departed in 2007, after completing season four. Caan wanted to resume his film career, and Cox was let go due to budget cuts, which were needed in order to greenlight a fifth season. After Caan's departure, Selleck was added to the cast as a new character. The series originally aired on Monday nights, before being moved to Friday nights in 2006. Ratings declined following the move, and Las Vegas was eventually canceled on February 20, 2008, ending the series with several cliffhangers.

== Premise ==
Las Vegas is a comedy drama that focuses primarily on Danny McCoy and his boss Ed Deline. They and others work at the Montecito, a fictional hotel-casino located on the Las Vegas Strip. The employees deal with a variety of issues, such as casino security, restaurant management, and valet parking. Danny, a former U.S. Marine 1st Lt. Counterintelligence/HUMINT (CI/HUMINT) officer initially works under the resort's head of security, Ed, former CIA counterintelligence chief. Early in the first season, Ed is promoted to president of operations. Danny has on-and-off relationships with Mary, a childhood friend; and Delinda, who is Ed's daughter.

The Montecito undergoes several ownership changes during the course of the series. The resort is demolished in the season-two finale in favor of a new Montecito, which opens in the third season under the ownership of Monica Mancuso. Following the end of season four, Ed and Mary go into hiding after killing her father, who sexually abused her as a child. In the fifth season, the Montecito is purchased by A.J. Cooper, a billionaire and former Marine. Danny becomes the new president of operations, and he moves in with Delinda, who is pregnant with their first child.

== Episodes ==
Season	Episodes	Originally released	
Season	Episodes	First released	Last released
1	23	September 22, 2003	May 17, 2004
2	24	September 13, 2004	May 23, 2005
3	23	September 19, 2005	May 12, 2006
4	17	October 27, 2006	March 9, 2007
5	19	September 28, 2007	February 15, 2008

== Cast and characters ==
=== Main ===
- Ed Deline (James Caan) is initially the head of security and surveillance for the Montecito, but is promoted to president of operations in the eighth episode. He is portrayed as a loving husband and father, as well as a father figure to his employees, especially Danny. Nevertheless, he is a tough man and does not hesitate to use violence to get what he wants. As the former director of counterintelligence for the CIA, his past has come back to haunt him on several occasions. During season three, Ed is briefly in retirement due to disagreements with the new Montecito owner, although he soon returns to his position. Caan and his character depart the series in season five when Ed becomes a wanted man for killing Mary Connell's father. Ed goes into hiding and resumes work for the CIA, being stationed in Paris.
- Danny McCoy (Josh Duhamel) is initially Ed Deline's apprentice and good friend who is later promoted to head of security for the Montecito. During season three, Danny briefly serves as president of operations for the resort, after Ed resigns. Upon Ed's return, Danny is reinstated as head of security. Danny is officially named the new president in season 5. Danny was born and raised in Las Vegas. At the end of season two, his father Larry McCoy (John Terry) dies in an accident and Danny inherits his father's house and construction company. Danny sells the house and uses the money to buy a condo. Danny is a former U.S. Marine, with guerrilla and counterintelligence training. He is recalled into military service in Iraq at the end of season one. In season two, he is awarded the Silver Star after calling in an air strike over his unit and himself when they were ambushed and overrun. Only he survives the strike. He is involved in an on-and-off relationship with Ed's daughter, Delinda, in season one. Danny and Mary have known each other since childhood, and they also have an on-and-off relationship. Danny proposes to Mary, but she calls off the engagement because she feels that he has a lot of things to sort out for himself. He ultimately begins living with girlfriend Delinda, who is pregnant with their first child in the final season.
- Mary Connell (Nikki Cox) is the special events director at the casino. A Las Vegas native, her father sexually abused her when she was a child, and Danny always came to her rescue. She is sometimes involved in a relationship with Danny, who proposes to her in season two – she accepts, then later calls off the engagement. In season three, Mary is promoted to hotel manager. In season four, she helps her stepmother and half sisters testify against her father – a case which is lost because of his connections. Near the end of season four, she purchases a gun to shoot her father. Cox departed the series and did not return for the fifth season. Explaining her character's absence, Mary is hiding from the law for her part in her father's murder, but is apparently safe, as she sends Danny a photo with a house and white picket fence (her dream house).
- Mike Cannon (James Lesure) is Danny's friend who studied mechanical engineering at MIT. He works as head valet for the first season, but is recruited by Ed to the security department to help during Danny's military absence. He stays on as security personnel following Danny's return. In season 5, Mike is promoted to head of security and surveillance. In the pilot episode, Mike has a wife and daughter; this plot line is seemingly abandoned thereafter. Mike and Nessa become close in season two, until she leaves to be with her father and sister. Mike and Piper get married in the final season.
- Samantha Jane "Sam" Marquez (Vanessa Marcil) is the self-proclaimed best casino host in the world. She lives in a Montecito suite and is portrayed as a ruthless businesswoman whose sole interest is to get high rollers to play at the Montecito. However, in the fourth season, she reveals that she is only "cold and jaded because everyone expects it of her", and "underneath it all, she is weak and pathetic like everyone else." She was married to billionaire Casey Manning, from whom she was estranged for seven years prior to divorcing. She is also involved in an on-and-off relationship with Det. Woody Hoyt from Crossing Jordan, until it ends in the fourth season. During this season, she is seen to be currently in love with and waiting for Jeremy, who fell into a 20-year coma after falling off a stool at a slot machine; he is the man who first brought her to Las Vegas from Austin, Texas. After Casey's death, Sam is left in control of the Montecito, but she fails to pay back taxes owed on the property. Her ownership lasts for a week, until A.J. Cooper buys the Montecito by paying off the taxes. In the season-five finale, Casey's younger brother Vic Manning visits the Montecito to take over ownership. At the end of the show, Sam and Vic plan to get married. When asked why Sam wants to marry Vic – she always stated she did not have feelings for him, though he loved her – she says it is because Vic understands her and will not try to change her; plus, he reminds her of Casey.
- Delinda Deline (Molly Sims) is Ed and Jillian's daughter. She is the entertainment manager for the Montecito's clubs, and also works as the food and beverage manager for the resort. Delinda is shown to have a genius-level IQ, and once majored in psychology, but decided the human race's biggest problem is that they are boring. During season three, Delinda leaves the Montecito to work for another casino. She returns at the request of new Montecito owner Monica Mancuso, who is disappointed that club earnings have dropped without her. Derek, an old college flame, asks Delinda to marry him in season three. She accepts the proposal, but just before the ceremony, Ed is shot. In the fray of Ed's medical crisis, Delinda calls off the wedding. In season five, she becomes pregnant with Danny's child, and they begin a relationship. At the end of the season-five finale, Delinda becomes overwhelmed with pain after just learning that Montecito owner A.J. Cooper is alive; he was supposedly killed in a plane crash. Delinda begins bleeding, although the series ends on a cliffhanger, leaving the fate of her unborn baby unknown.
- Nessa Holt (Marsha Thomason), also known as "The Ice Queen", is the head pit boss of the Montecito and is described as being the best in Las Vegas. She was born in Manchester, England, and has a shady past due to her father's connections with Ed Deline. Her father was a well-known gambler, cheater, and con artist, who was forcefully recruited into the CIA and faked his death. Nessa was raised by Ed and Jillian for some years, and is referred to as a sister to Delinda. At the opening of season three, Nessa is explained to have left Las Vegas and been given a new identity to be able to live with her father and long-lost sister. She and Mike had been getting closer to a relationship, although she fails to say goodbye to him.
- A.J. Cooper (Tom Selleck) becomes the latest owner of the Montecito in season five. He is a former Marine and cattle rancher from Wyoming who stirs things up at the casino. His net worth is about $2 billion. Cooper was a black ops Marine in the Vietnam War and awarded the Bronze Star for his work. During his time in the Marines, he served in the Battle of Khe Sanh. In the season five finale, Cooper's jet crashes during a business trip, and he is presumed dead. However, during the final moments of the show, Cooper arrives at his memorial service and appears to be fine.

=== Recurring ===
- Monica Mancuso (Lara Flynn Boyle) becomes the new owner of the Montecito in season three. She is portrayed as self-centered and bull-headed, and is generally disliked by the staff. At age 25, she married an 83-year-old billionaire. Upon his death at age 93, she inherited his fortune and used it to purchase and upgrade the Montecito. Dedicated to proving that she is more than just a woman who inherited money, she is determined to make the Montecito a success. She uses the resort as collateral to try purchasing other casinos in Las Vegas. Nine episodes into the third season, Monica dies in a freak accident: a gust of wind blows her off the roof of the Montecito and down the Las Vegas Strip, before she crashes into a shoe store. Her outfit, with wing-like sleeves, contributed to her being blown off the roof. The scene was created to be humorous. In accordance with her final wishes, the Montecito staff flush her cremated remains down a toilet in her suite at the resort.
- Casey Manning (Dean Cain) is a shrewd and cunning businessman, and Sam Marquez's ex-husband. He buys the Montecito in the third season, following Monica's death. In season four, Casey is killed in a fishing accident: a giant squid envelops him off the coast of New Zealand. The autopsy reveals that he was poisoned before the accident. He leaves the Montecito to Sam, who faces tax problems he left. In the series finale, Sam plans to marry Casey's brother Vic, though she does not love him, because Vic reminds her of Casey.
- Piper Nielsen (Camille Guaty), the newest concierge of the Montecito, is introduced in season five. She is fired for letting an underage person gamble, but Cooper pays a $1 million fine to hire her back, raising speculation among the casino staff about their relationship. Piper never knew who her father was, until Cooper reveals that they served together in the Marines. Before her father died, Cooper promised that he would keep an eye on Piper. As she moved to various states over the years, he did the same in order to be there for her, though without her knowledge. Mike and Piper get married near the end of the season.
- Mitch Sassen (Mitch Longley) is a regular member of the surveillance team, and like the actor who plays him, he is paraplegic and uses a wheelchair.
- Jillian Deline (Cheryl Ladd) is Ed's wife and Delinda's mother. Jillian expresses growing resentment of Ed's time on the job. In the season-four finale, Jillian says she will leave Ed if he decides to purchase the Montecito. In the opening of season five, she is revealed to support Ed's decision for better or worse after learning of her future grandchild. She leaves Ed after they move away under sketchy circumstances.
- Luis Perez (Guy Ecker) is a Las Vegas police detective who appears in the first two seasons. He is a childhood friend of Danny and Mary, and friend of Ed Deline and his team. He also had served in the Marines, and his unit is later recalled for service in Iraq, where he dies in the first week there. A funeral is held in his honor with Ed and everyone attending, and he is discovered to have a child whose existence was unknown to him.
- Kathy Berson (Rikki Klieman) is the Montecito's main legal adviser and lawyer, introduced in season two. If any legal issues arise, Kathy is the first person whom everyone asks.
- Polly (Suzanne Whang) is a Korean manicurist in the Montecito's spa. She is introduced in season three, and later forms a friendship with A.J. Cooper. Polly openly discusses her sexual experiences.
- Sarasvati Kumar (Lakshmi Manchu) is an accountant for the casino. She appears in the first three seasons, and eventually begins a relationship with Mike, although this ends in the season-three finale after she goes home with Delinda's bachelorette party strippers.
- Gunther (Harry Groener), appearing in the first three seasons, is the temperamental executive chef at the Montecito's original restaurant. He habitually has issues that require Delinda's attention, and develops a rivalry with Wolfgang Puck when the more famous chef opens a restaurant at the casino. Gunther eventually quits after losing a cook-off to Puck; he sells his restaurant to Charo.
- Erika (Anna Pheil), appearing in seasons three through five, is a hard-as-nails barmaid Danny hires on a lark when he sees her dealing with customers while tending bar at a strip club.
- Shannon (Malaya Drew) is a member of the Montecito's security. She plays a small role in six episodes, spanning the third and fourth season. She briefly shows interest in Mike.

=== Notable guest stars ===
Various guest stars have appeared on the show, sometimes portraying themselves. Notable guest stars have included Alec Baldwin, Little Richard, Mark McGrath, Sylvester Stallone, Las Vegas mayor Oscar Goodman, Norm Clarke, Jewel, Wayne Newton and Gladys Knight. Larry Manetti and Roger E. Mosley made a guest appearance in season 5 as characters named Larry and Roger, who are friends of A.J. Cooper. Selleck, Manetti, and Mosley had previously starred on Magnum, P.I., and their appearance together in Las Vegas marked their first reunion since the ending of Magnum, P.I. in 1988.

== Production ==
=== Development ===
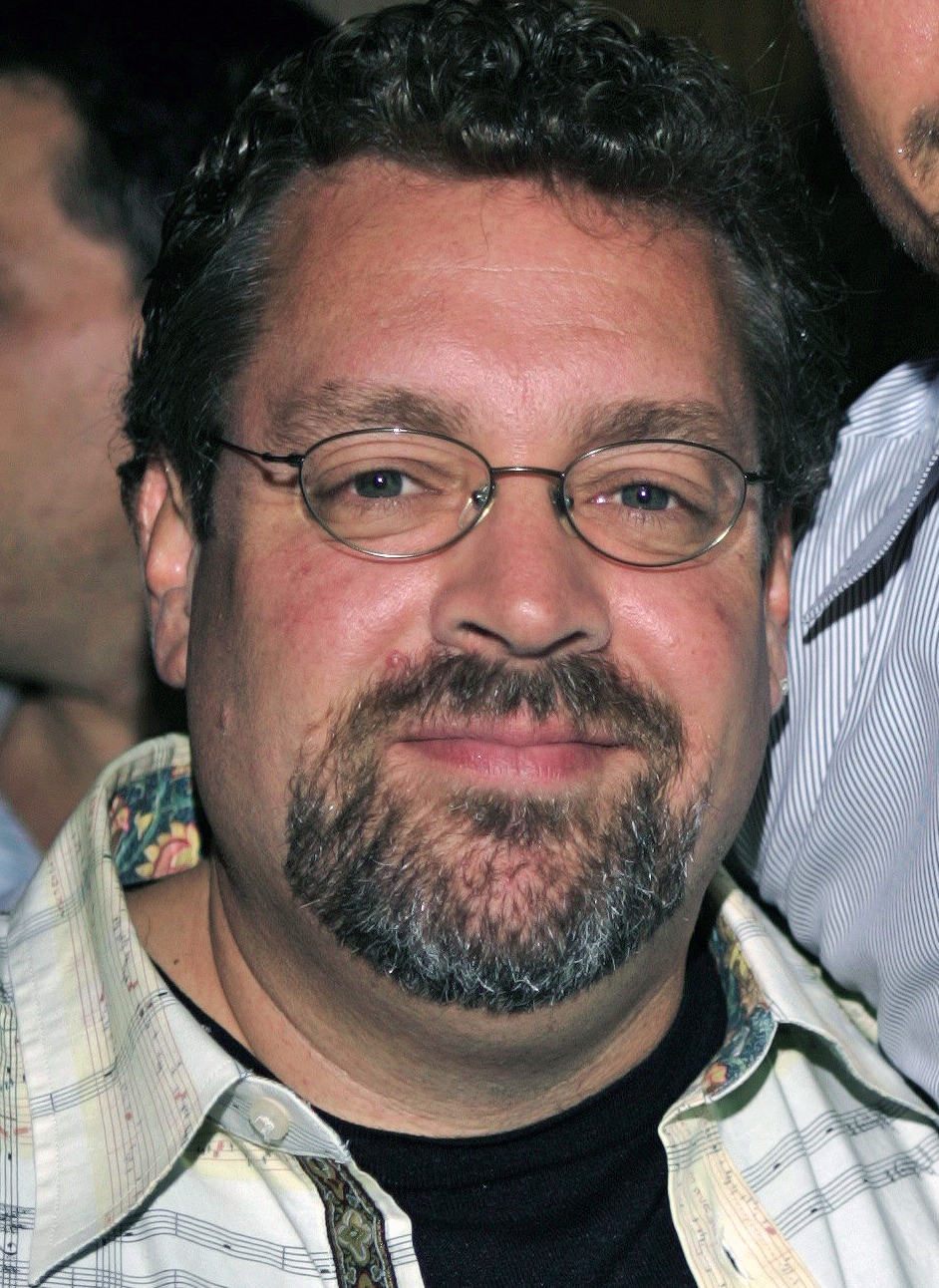
Gary Scott Thompson

Las Vegas was created by Gary Scott Thompson, who also served as an executive producer. The idea for the series dates back to Las Vegas vacations that Thompson would take in the late 1980s. On one trip, Thompson developed a vision of a dead body lying in the desert, and then "we pan up and there's the Strip 50 yards away. That was what ended up in the pilot, that opening shot, but I couldn't ever figure out what that went to. So I had that thing in my head for 15 years." At various points, Thompson tried developing this idea into a novel or play.

In 2002, Thompson had been working with NBC on a television pilot for a different series; although this pilot was unsuccessful, NBC officials who worked with Thompson later asked him to create a Las Vegas-based series. At the time, Thompson felt that there was a lack of "fun" and entertaining shows on television, telling NBC that there were too many procedural dramas such as CSI and Law & Order. For Las Vegas, Thompson was inspired by the city's evolving history and its megaresorts, saying, "If there are 127,000 (hotel) rooms in the city, that means I've got a potential 127,000 stories every week, because everybody's got a story, and so do all the people who live here." The show would be reminiscent of the 1970s series Vegas. Originally known under the working title Casino Eye, the new series would also include Scott Steindorff as producer. Initially, Don Johnson was also going to serve as an executive producer, although he ultimately had no involvement in the final project.

=== Casting and character changes ===
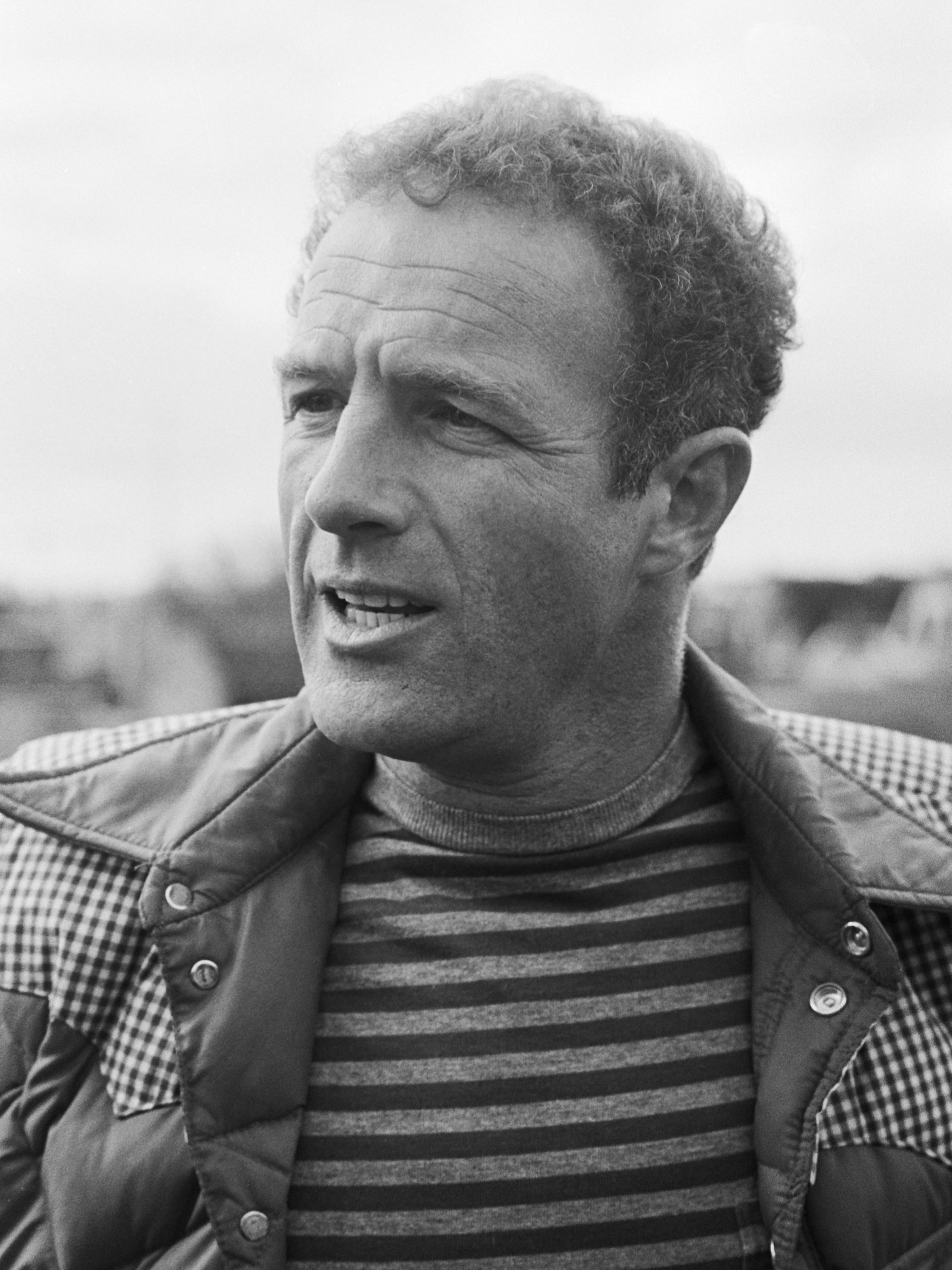
James Caan

James Caan was among several actors considered for the role of Ed Deline, although the producers were initially unsure that they could get Caan to sign on. Johnson was considered for the role, but turned it down. Caan was cast at the last minute, marking his first starring role in a television series. Caan later said that he took the television role due to a lack of film offers. He also said in 2005 that he had never watched the series. Caan was initially doubtful about starring in a series; he insisted that his role require effort on his part, and that the character be "multidimensional and complex." As originally written, the character would spend much of his time in a surveillance room looking at camera footage. Caan disliked this idea and considered the role limited, saying that Ed Deline should be "more elastic, so there could be some humor." Caan had the role rewritten, allowing his character to spend time outside of the surveillance room. Actress Molly Sims said about Caan, "If the writing's not good, or he doesn't like it, he's very picky, but that's what makes it good. He adds clout to our show." Caan and Sims did not get along for the first two seasons. Approximately 350 women auditioned for the role of Delinda Deline, before it eventually went to Sims.

The character of Danny McCoy was developed by Thompson to be a Las Vegas resident, like himself. He said, "It's a city of almost 2 million people. We wanted to capture not just the Strip. People live here and it's their home, and we wanted to capture that." Nikki Cox's character, Mary, was originally an escort in the pilot episode, although her title was changed to events planner for the rest of the series. According to Sims, "I believe the network felt that it would be 'unseemly' to have your protagonist's girl-next-door sweetheart and the ultimate love of his life be an escort." The part of Nessa was originally written as a 60-year-old man, although Thompson was impressed enough with Marsha Thomason's audition that he rewrote the role for her. Thomason signed a seven-year contract, but later departed the series after the second season, in order to pursue other projects.

=== Filming ===
Filming for the pilot episode began on March 17, 2003, in the Las Vegas Valley. Filming locations included the Mandalay Bay resort, the Fremont Street Experience, and a warehouse that the production crew used to build a surveillance room set. The pilot cost $5 million, making it the most expensive in NBC history. Filming lasted nearly three weeks, and the pilot was picked up shortly thereafter. Series production began in July 2003, with an eight-day shooting schedule for each hour-long episode. Each episode initially cost $2.3 million to produce, although the budget was gradually raised to $2.7 million as the series progressed.

Although most of the production occurred in California, some filming also occasionally took place in Las Vegas. Filming primarily occurred at a studio in Culver City in California. Steindorff said that the writers would make regular visits to Las Vegas to "immerse themselves in that world". Thompson said that during these trips, the team would ask real security guards "if it's too far-fetched if we do X, Y and Z. They say, 'Are you crazy? That happens all of the time'".

The series premiered in September 2003, and its success prompted NBC to greenlight nine additional episodes for the season. The show went over budget in its first season, necessitating the need for a cheap episode that would keep the cast on the Montecito set in California. As a result, an episode was written in which a blackout and a murder occur simultaneously at the Montecito, keeping the characters at the resort. Thompson said, "We were not allowed to have any guest appearances. I thought, 'How do we trap them all in the casino.'" The episode received some criticism from people who doubted that a casino blackout was possible, although such an event occurred at the Bellagio resort a few months after the episode aired.

To refresh the series, Thompson wrote in the demolition of the Montecito for the end of season two, with a new version of the resort being opened in the third season. In addition, Lara Flynn Boyle was cast as Monica Mancuso, the new owner of the Montecito, in July 2005. For the role, Boyle took inspiration from Shirley MacLaine: "I always daydreamed about being one of the Rat Pack. Shirley MacLaine could really hold her own with [Frank Sinatra and] the boys. I feel the same way — never let them see you sweat or cry."

==== Montecito ====
Early on, the Culver Studios complex had eight sets that depicted the Montecito resort, including a 20,000 sq ft (1,900 m^{2}) casino set. Other sets depicted hotel rooms, hallways, elevators, a dance club, and the Montecito's surveillance room. A coffee shop set was added for the second season. Some Montecito scenes were also filmed at the Mandalay Bay, particularly in the casino and at the resort's wave pool. Glenn Schaeffer, the president of Mandalay Resort Group, also made several appearances in early episodes. During season 1, the Green Valley Ranch, a hotel-casino in Henderson, Nevada, was also used to portray the Montecito.

A new Montecito set was created for the third season, measuring 40,000 sq ft (3,700 m^{2}) and occupying three stories across six sound stages. The production team incorporated product placement into the set to alleviate its high cost. Among the brands featured in the third season was Aston Martin, which is shown to have a dealership at the Montecito. This was done following the opening of a Ferrari dealership at the new Wynn resort. Thompson wanted the series to feel current with the latest attractions in Las Vegas. A Wolfgang Puck restaurant was also added to the set, and Puck appeared as himself in the series.

As of season 4, the Montecito set included 146 slot machines and 24 table games. This set went $2 million over budget, but was built in eight weeks to meet the deadline for the start of filming. Exterior shots show the Montecito at the south end of the Las Vegas Strip, across the street from the Luxor resort, although the views from interior shots imply different and contradictory locations on the Strip. Ahead of the fifth season premiere, Thompson joked about the Montecito's location, "We're just going to keep moving it around, just to piss people off."

=== Final seasons and cancellation ===
Season 3 saw a drop in ratings, and Las Vegas was only renewed for 17 episodes in its next season, instead of the standard 22. The series was facing cancellation after the premiere of its fourth season. For the season finale, Thompson told NBC, "I'm gonna make this the biggest cliffhanger anyone's ever seen. And if you cancel us, you're gonna have 15 million fans pissed off at you, not me." The fate of a fifth season was contingent on budget cuts. NBC announced a fifth season in February 2007, while stating that Caan and Nikki Cox would depart the series. Caan had wanted to resume his film career; he previously had to pass on several film opportunities due to conflicts with the Las Vegas production schedule. Cox was let go from the production due to budget cuts. Although she was upset and surprised by the decision, she had also suggested during season 4 that it may be time for her to move on from the series. Like Cox, Caan's departure would also allow for budget cuts. The writers were caught off-guard by the cast departures, which were announced at the last minute.

Tom Selleck was cast in April 2007, as the Montecito's new owner, A.J. Cooper. Las Vegas marked Selleck's first main role on a television series since Magnum, P.I. Selleck was Thompson's first choice for the role. To prepare, Selleck watched the previous season on DVD. Selleck's character would fill the void left by Caan, while a new female concierge (ultimately played by Camille Guaty) would serve as a replacement for Cox's character. Filming for the fifth season began at the end of April 2007, three months earlier than usual. Production began early to avoid a potential writers strike. Three episodes ultimately went unproduced because of the strike, leaving the season with 19 episodes.

Due to low ratings, NBC canceled the series on February 20, 2008, five days after the airing of the season 5 finale. Thompson said, "I sold my soul to get a Season 5, so I didn't have a soul left to sell. We fought an uphill battle from day one. We were the little big show that could." Thompson said that the series did not receive adequate promotion, and Caan later said that some poor episode plots helped contribute to the show's downfall.

The series ended with several cliffhangers, including the fate of Delinda Deline's unborn baby. In reaction to the cancellation, upset fans sent baby booties and dolls to NBC, demanding a proper ending. Discussions had been held about making a two-hour film to serve as a finale. In the event that a proper resolution should not be possible, Thompson had an alternate plan for Danny McCoy and Delinda Deline to cameo in an episode of Knight Rider, carrying their newborn. Due to Knight Rider's cancellation, however, Danny and Delinda's cameo appearance never came to fruition.

== Music ==
A soundtrack for the series was released in September 2005.

Various theme songs have been used for the opening credits, depending on where, how, or when the show has aired. In France, Italy, Spain, Portugal, the Netherlands, the United Kingdom, and other countries, the theme song is "Let It Ride" by Charlie Clouser and Jon Ingoldsby, while in other countries, such as the United States and Canada, the theme song is "A Little Less Conversation" by Elvis Presley, off of the album Memories: The '68 Comeback Special.

For American DVD releases, episodes available for viewing on NBC's website and reruns shown on the cable network E!, Clouser's song is used (with the exception of the pilot episode), most likely because the original clearances for use of the Presley song did not extend to syndication and home video sales.

== Release ==
=== Broadcast ===
Las Vegas aired on NBC and premiered on September 22, 2003. It originally aired on Monday nights, but was moved to Friday nights starting on March 3, 2006. NBC had acquired the rights to air NBC Sunday Night Football, through a contract with the National Football League (NFL). The NFL sought to distance itself from the city of Las Vegas, and a clause in the contract prohibited any mention of the city during Sunday Night Football. This would include next-night promotion of Las Vegas, prompting the change to Fridays.

The third season ended with several cliffhangers, and the season 4 premiere was delayed twice, eventually premiering on October 27, 2006. This was done in order to give 1 vs. 100, a popular new game show, another Friday night in the timeslot, while providing more time to promote the season premiere of Las Vegas.

The series aired its 100th episode on January 11, 2008.

The American channel TNT purchased the rights to air reruns, beginning in 2007. E! later started airing reruns, in 2020. Cozi TV acquired the broadcast rights in 2022.

In Bulgaria, the series was broadcast on NOVA, Fox Crime, Fox (three of which used the 1st dub, but for different reasons on reruns it has been replaced by a new dub), and is currently airing on bTV, which uses the 2nd dub done by Studio VMS, and in Italy it previously aired on Fox and Rai 2.

=== Home media ===
All five seasons were released on DVD from DreamWorks Home Entertainment. The DVDs include extra scenes that were too sexual for network television. These scenes were shot specifically for the DVDs, as Thompson said that extra features helped DVD sales. As of early 2008, the series had sold 500,000 DVD copies in North America, with four seasons available at the time.

Name	Episode #	Region 1	Region 2	Region 4
Season One	23	January 4, 2005	March 14, 2005	November 28, 2005
Season Two	24	September 13, 2005	December 5, 2005	November 28, 2005
Season Three	23	September 12, 2006	November 30, 2006	November 15, 2006
Season Four	17	September 11, 2007	October 29, 2007	April 1, 2009
Season Five	19	July 22, 2008	October 13, 2008	December 2, 2009

=== Online media ===
The series is available to stream on both Amazon Prime Video and Peacock.

== Reception ==
=== Critical response ===
Alessandra Stanley of The New York Times reviewed the pilot episode. She was critical of Caan's acting, but wrote that the show "manages to be slick, fast-paced and engaging", concluding that it "leaves enough mysteries open to keep viewers coming back for another look". Robert Lloyd of the Los Angeles Times described Caan as the show's only "sign of real life", finding the other actors to be attractive but otherwise lacking: "They are not so much characters—not yet, anyway—as extensions of their clothes, or cleavage. You don't relate to them so much as simply stare." Lloyd considered the production values to be "extremely high" and wrote, "This may be trash, but it comes in an attractive can."

Phil Gallo of Variety called the series a guilty pleasure and described the tone as "light and unforced", thanks to the actors and "some sharp editing". Reviewing the first season, DVD Talk described Las Vegas as a "fast-paced, slick, and attractive television series that rarely takes itself too seriously and never fails to entertain."

In a review for the second season, Charlie McCollum of San Jose Mercury News/Contra Costa Times called Las Vegas a guilty pleasure and wrote, "Flashy, often trashy and slickly produced, the drama may be fluff, but it's good, sexy fluff with James Caan on hand to provide a bit of gravitas."

=== Television ratings ===
Originally, Las Vegas was not expected to succeed. However, it proved to be a ratings success in its first season, despite competition from Monday Night Football, Everybody Loves Raymond, Joe Millionaire, Skin, and My Big Fat Obnoxious Fiance. Ratings dropped after the series moved to Friday nights in 2006, with episodes averaging less than 9 million viewers. Caan said that the move to Fridays was "like a death sentence."

As of early 2008, the series aired in multiple countries. It was popular among viewers in Australia, France, and Spain, but received limited viewership in Germany.

Below is a table of Las Vegas seasonal rankings in the U.S. television market, based on average total viewers per episode. Each U.S. network television season starts in September and ends in late May, which coincides with the completion of May sweeps.

Season	Episodes	Timeslot (ET)	Originally aired			Nielsen Ratings		
Season	Episodes	Timeslot (ET)	Season premiere	Season finale	TV season	Rank	Viewers	18-49 rank
1	23	Monday 9:00 PM	September 22, 2003	May 17, 2004	2003–04	#27	11.83	#18
2	24	Monday 9:00 PM	September 13, 2004	May 23, 2005	2004–05	#33	11.43	#30
3	23	Monday 9:00 PM (Sept. 2005 – Feb. 2006) Friday 9:00 PM (Mar. 2006 – May 2006)	September 19, 2005	May 12, 2006	2005–06	#46	10.51	#43
4	17	Friday 9:00 PM	October 27, 2006	March 9, 2007	2006–07	#70	9.02	#65
5	19	Friday 10:00 PM	September 28, 2007	February 15, 2008	2007–08	#66	8.46	#83

== Other media ==
Las Vegas had several crossover episodes with the NBC series Crossing Jordan, starting in the second season. A total of eight crossover episodes were produced between the two shows.

The Montecito has appeared in several other shows — Heroes, Knight Rider, Medium, Monk, and Passions — when characters from those shows visited Las Vegas. Of these, only the daytime soap Passions included Las Vegas characters in cameo roles: Nikki Cox appeared as Mary Connell.

The Las Vegas episode "The Story of Owe" mentions a Dunder-Mifflin convention, obliquely linking to The Office.

In the episodes "Father of the Bride Redux" and "Died in Plain Sight", when Ed Deline travels to Morocco to find and relocate a former CIA asset, the false passport he uses is in the name of Alan Bourdillion Traherne. This is the name of the character he played in the 1966 film El Dorado.

The Las Vegas tie-in novel High Stakes Game, by Jeff Mariotte, tells the tale of what could have occurred between the season-two finale and the season-three premiere when the casino was destroyed and rebuilt and the characters briefly went their separate ways. A second novel called Sleight of Hand, also by Mariotte, was launched in 2007.

== See also ==
- List of television shows set in Las Vegas
