= Matt Pyken =

American television writer and producer

Matthew Lewis Pyken is an American television writer and producer.

== Biography ==
=== Early life and education ===
Pyken was born in Brooklyn, New York, to Eugene Pyken, a fundraiser, and Rhoda Singer Pyken, a teacher. The oldest of three children, he has two sisters. At age nine his family moved to Van Nuys, California. He attended Claremont McKenna College, where he graduated with degrees in Literature and Political Science.

=== Career ===
Pyken has written for many television shows, including: The Invisible Man, D.C., Queer as Folk , John Doe and Las Vegas. He has also produced episodes for John Doe, Queer as Folk, Las Vegas and the megahit Empire. He is also listed as the consulting producer on a number of episodes of the first season of the critically acclaimed show Mr. Robot. He wrote and co-produced the video games National Lampoon's Blind Date and Fox Hunt.
