= Fox Hunt (video game) =

1996 video game

- Developer: 3Vision Games
- Publisher: Capcom
- Director: Michael Berns
- Producers: Adam Burns; Matt Pyken
- Writer: Matt Pyken
- Composer: Mark Mothersbaugh
- Platforms: Microsoft Windows, PlayStation
- Release: Microsoft Windows: NA: February 1996; PlayStation: NA: October 28, 1996
- Genre: Interactive movie
- Mode: Single-player

Fox Hunt is a 1996 interactive movie video game developed by 3Vision Games and published by Capcom for Microsoft Windows and PlayStation. It is an interactive movie title with live action visuals in the vein of a spy film.

After its release on Windows, the game's creators acquired additional funds, shot more footage, and released Fox Hunt as a direct-to-video film in several countries.

== Plot ==
Jack Fremont is known for his knowledge of TV shows; it turns out life is rough right now. He is kicked out of his house forever.

== Gameplay ==
The gameplay of this game is varied. In some places the player character explores rooms and finds objects, and in others he enters fighting and action sequences. There is a time limit in many of these sequences. A red box in the corner of the screen informs the player when they need to take action during a quick time event.

== Development and release ==
Fox Hunt was developed by movie studio 3Vision Gamers with funding provided by publisher Capcom. It was the first project greenlit by former Capcom USA president Greg Ballard, who had recently joined the company soon after he left the developer Digital Pictures and witnessed the production of Resident Evil in Japan. Fox Hunt was developed on a budget of up to $2 million. 3Vision consisted of writer/producer Matt Pyken, producer/lawyer Adam Berns, and director Michael Berns (Adam's brother) at the helm. The trio had previously created the 1994 PC game National Lampoon's Blind Date. Michael Berns and designer/programmer Peter Marx had a singular "cinematic vision" on how Fox Hunt should play in that it was structured like a three-act feature film. Berns found that FMV games released up to that point focused more on showcasing technology in place of including good gameplay. The director wanted Fox Hunt to be considered as a full-fledged video game and not simply an interactive movie like those earlier titles. The gameplay engine designed by Marx is based on the one he built for the PC game Johnny Mnemonic. However, he intended Fox Hunt to have the "compelling time component" of a motion picture that kept the story dynamic rather than the "limited action and choppy movement" found in Johnny Mnemonic.

Fox Hunt was shot on 16 mm film instead of video for improved resolution. Casting for the game was conducted in the second quarter of 1995. Chief among the cast were newcomer Andrew Bowen as the game's protagonist, one-time James Bond star George Lazenby, and Timothy Bottoms (of The Last Picture Show). Scenes was filmed over 35 days, mostly at the former Ambassador Hotel in Los Angeles, though four days were set aside for shooting skiing footage in Aspen, Colorado. Lazenby commented on the shooting schedule: "Actors need a lot of flexibility since scenes are shot so quickly and you instantly go from being good to being evil. As Bond [in On Her Majesty's Secret Service], I once waited three days while the crew prepared to film a single scene! On Fox Hunt we do a new scene every hour. It's the way movies should be made." Filming ultimately consisted of about 2,200 camera setups, around 20,000 edits, over three hours of live-action footage, 735 shots, and nine different endings.

The game's background music was composed and co-written by Mark Mothersbaugh while 3Vision partnered with Rhino Records and Tri-Tone Music to include licensed songs for the remainder of the soundtrack. Tri-Tone's Jennifer Pyken, the sister of the game's producer Matt, was appointed by Capcom as music supervisor and both helped purchase licenses from various artists and sell the soundtrack to Rhino. Pyken chose to include old-school hip hop, surf music, and modern rock to serve as clues within the game; additional clues would be present in the soundtrack's liner notes when it was released by Rhino on January 23, 1996. "Our first priority was finding songs that were appropriate for the game," Pyken stated. "In that sense were approached it like we would any film. But we also kept in mind the audience, which is relatively young but wide-ranging taste in new music and old." Among the included artists were Violent Femmes, Butthole Surfers, Dick Dale, The Sugar Hill Gang, Faith No More, and Poster Children.

Fox Hunt was released exclusively in North America for Microsoft Windows on January 31, 1996 and for PlayStation on September 30, 1996. Versions of the game were in development for the Sega Saturn and Mac OS. Despite being officially advertised alongside the other versions, these were never released. The Windows version of Fox Hunt sold 25,000 copies in its first six months on sale. By mid-1997, both versions of the game had sold about 50,000 copies combined. Ballard regretted the game's production, recalled a substantially higher production budget of $5 million, and exaggerated its commercial performance. He lamented, "I think we sold 132 copies. So somewhere, somebody has a copy of it, and it is a true collector's item, because it is the worst that was ever made. Ever."

=== Film version ===
After its debut as a video game, the Berns brothers decided to rework Fox Hunt into a feature-length film for television and home video. A foreign distributor encouraged 3Vision to cut a trailer after the company showed the game at the 1996 Cannes Film Festival. Backed by Los Angeles-based sales agent Redwood Communications, 3Vision managed to sell the rights to the film to several foreign distributors and secure several hundred thousand dollars in funds to hire more talent and shoot additional footage. Adam Berns explained that the company had to negotiate with the Screen Actors Guild to use the game footage (created under an interactive contract) for a motion picture. Three quarters of the film's footage consisted of the game's cutscenes while new scenes were shot over an eight day period, would include actor Gary Coleman, and required about 900 additional edits. "Essentially what we did is took our best footage from the game and wrote a story around it, using the general plot of the CD-ROM script,” Adam Berns stated. As of mid-1997, the game had not acquired a US distributor.

== Reception ==
Reception

Review scores
Publication	Score
GameSpot	6.8/10
Computer Game Review	116/300
Entertainment Weekly	B−
PC Entertainment	2.8/6
PC Joker	62%

Critical reception for Fox Hunt ranged from poor to average. Computer Game Review gave the game a negative review, calling it "just another example of how unplayable interactive movies can be." GameSpot said this about the game: "Overlooking some of the childish antics of its hero, Capcom's Fox Hunt is an interactive movie that merits more than a showing or two. It's silly and amusing but surprisingly well developed and fun to play." and gave it a 6.8.

Ann Kwinn of Boxoffice gave the film version of Fox Hunt three out of five stars.
