= Million Dollar Backfield =

Two National Football League offensive backfields were at one point known as the Million Dollar Backfield:

- Million Dollar Backfield (Chicago Cardinals), backfield of the Chicago Cardinals c. 1947
- Million Dollar Backfield (San Francisco 49ers), backfield of the San Francisco 49ers c. 1954
