= The Fabulous Five (book series) =

Book series by Betsy Haynes

The Fabulous Five is an American book series by Betsy Haynes in the late 1980s. Written mainly for preteen girls, it is a spin-off of Haynes' other series about Taffy Sinclair. It centers on five best friends; Jana Morgan, Melanie Edwards, Beth Barry, Christie Winchell, and Katie Shannon, along with their other classmates at Wakeman Junior High (fondly nicknamed 'Wacko Jr. High' by the students). It is published by Bantam/Skylark books and enjoyed moderate success.

In the Taffy Sinclair series, the five girls, then in sixth grade, started the 'Against Taffy Sinclair Club', which served as a forum for venting about the appearance, antics, and general attitude of Taffy Sinclair, the snobbiest and most popular girl in school.

The Fabulous Five series follows the girls as they move on to junior high school. The books take place in the real town of Bridgeport, Connecticut.

The series ended in 1992.

== Setting ==
Each book is written from the perspective of one of the girls and incorporates tidbits about each family, insight into how each girl feels about the issue at hand, and how she feels about the boy in her life.

=== Main characters ===
- Jana Morgan, a member of the Fabulous Five.
- Beth Barry, a member of the Fabulous Five.
- Christie Winchell, a member of the Fabulous Five.
- Katie Shannon, a member of the Fabulous Five.
- Melanie Edwards, a member of the Fabulous Five.
- Taffy Sinclair, a rival of the Fabulous Five.
- Laura McCall, the leader of the rival clique, The Fantastic Foursome.

== List of books ==
1. Seventh Grade Rumors (1988)
2. The Trouble With Flirting (1988)
3. The Popularity Trap (1988)
4. Her Honor, Katie Shannon (1988)
5. The Bragging War (1989)
6. Parent Game (1989)
7. The Kissing Disaster (1989)
8. The Runaway Crisis (1989)
9. The Boyfriend Dilemma (1989)
10. Playing the Part (1989)
11. Hit and Run (1989)
12. Katie's Dating Tips (1989)
13. The Christmas Countdown (1989)
14. Seventh-Grade Menace (1989)
15. Melanie's Identity Crisis (1990)
16. The Hot-Line Emergency (1990)
17. Celebrity Auction (1990)
18. Teen Taxi (1990)
19. The Boys-only Club (1990)
20. The Witches of Wakeman (1990)
21. Jana to the Rescue (1990)
22. Melanie's Valentine (1991)
23. Mall Mania (1991)
24. The Great TV Turnoff (1991)
25. Fabulous Five Minus One (1991)
26. Laura's Secret (1991)
27. The Scapegoat (1991)
28. Breaking Up (1991)
29. Melanie Edwards, Super Kisser (1992)
30. Sibling Rivalry (1992)
31. The Fabulous Five Together Again (1992)
32. Class Trip Calamity (1992)

=== Super Edition ===
1. The Fabulous Five in Trouble (1990)
2. Caribbean Adventure (1990)
3. Missing You (1991)
4. Yearbook Memories (1992)
