= Betsy Haynes =

American author

Betsy Haynes (born October 20, 1937, in Benton, Illinois) is an American author who has written 79 novels in the genres of history, mysteries, supernatural, ghost stories and comedies. She has used the pseudonym B. R. Haynes.

She is married to Jim Haynes. They have two children and live in the Stewart Peninsula section of The Colony, Texas on Lake Lewisville north of Dallas.

Haynes's novels include The Great Mom Swap, which was adapted into a 1995 film of the same name, and the Bone Chillers series, which was adapted into a television series of the same name. She also wrote the 36-book series The Fabulous Five. Her novel Deadly Deception was placed on the following book lists: as the American Library Association's Quick Picks for Reluctant Young Adult Readers, the New York Public Library's Books for the Teen Age and the Texas Lone Star List.

== Select publications ==
=== Bone Chillers series ===
- Beware the Shopping Mall (1994)
- Little Pet Shop of Horrors (1994)
- Back to School (1994)
- Frankenturkey (1994)
- Strange Brew (1995)
- Teacher Creature (1995)
- Frankenturkey II (1995)
- Welcome to Alien Inn (1996)
- Attack of the Killer Ants (1996)
- Slime Time (1996)
- The Thing Under the Bed (1997), with Daniel Ehrenhaft
- The Dog Ate My Homework (1997)

=== The Fabulous Five series ===
- Seventh-Grade Rumors. Bantam. 1988. ISBN 978-0-553-15625-6. OCLC 18458368.

=== Taffy Sinclair series ===
- The Against Taffy Sinclair Club. Nelson. 1976.
- Taffy Sinclair, Baby Ashley, and Me. Bantam Books. 1987. ISBN 978-0-553-15557-0.
- The Truth About Taffy Sinclair. Bantam Skylark. 1988. ISBN 978-0-553-15607-2. OCLC 18242970.
- Taffy Sinclair Goes to Hollywood. Bantam Books. 1990. ISBN 978-0-553-15819-9.

=== Standalone books ===
- Spies on the Devil's Belt. Nelson. 1974.
- The Ghost of the Gravestone Hearth. Nelson. 1977.
- The Shadows of Jeremy Pimm (1981)
- The Power (1982)
- The Great Mom Swap. Bantam. 1986. ISBN 978-0-553-15398-9.
- The Great Boyfriend Trap. Skylark. 1987. ISBN 978-0-553-15530-3. OCLC 17392139.
- Deadly Deception. New York: Delacorte Press. 1994. ISBN 978-0-385-32067-2.
- The Great Dad Disaster. Bantam Books. 1994. ISBN 978-0-553-48169-3.
- Sneaking Around. Random House. 1995. ISBN 978-0-679-86022-8.
