= Underbelly =

Underbelly is the side of something that is not normally seen. Figuratively, it means a vulnerable or weak part, similar to the term Achilles' heel, or alternatively, a hidden, illicit side of society.

This term could refer to:

== Business ==
- Underbelly Limited, an entertainment company in the UK

== Television ==
=== Australia and New Zealand ===
- Underbelly (TV series), an Australian true crime drama television series, that borrows the title of the book series by journalists John Silvester and Andrew Rule and is primarily based on other works by the same authors:
  - Underbelly (series 1), a 2008 Australian television drama mini-series and first in the franchise
  - Underbelly: A Tale of Two Cities, a 2009 Australian drama mini-series prequel to the franchise
  - Underbelly: The Golden Mile, a 2010 Australian drama mini-series prequel in succession to Tale
  - Underbelly: Razor, a 2011 Australian drama mini-series, fourth in the franchise
  - Underbelly: Badness, a 2012 Australian drama mini-series, fifth in the franchise
  - Underbelly: Squizzy, a 2013 Australian drama mini-series, sixth in the franchise
  - Underbelly: Vanishing Act, a 2022 Australian drama mini-series, seventh in the franchise
- Underbelly Files, an Australian drama mini-series trilogy that continues the original Underbelly series. It consists of four 2-hour length telemovies titled:
  - Tell Them Lucifer Was Here, a 2011 Australian made-for-television movie
  - Infiltration, a 2011 Australian made-for-television movie
  - The Man Who Got Away, a 2011 Australian made-for-television movie
  - Underbelly Files: Chopper a 2017 Australian mini-series
- Underbelly NZ: Land of the Long Green Cloud, a 2011 New Zealand spin-off of the Australian series
- Fat Tony & Co., a 2014 Australian true crime drama television series and the unbranded sequel to the first series
- Informer 3838, a 2020 Australian spin-off of the Underbelly series

=== United States ===
- Notes from the Underbelly, an American television sitcom

== Music ==
- Underbelly (soundtrack)
- "The Underbelly", a song by Died Pretty in the 1990 album Every Brilliant Eye
