= Tim Ellis =

Tim Ellis may refer to:

- Tim Ellis (bishop) (born 1953), Church of England bishop
- Tim Ellis (lawyer) (born 1955), Australian barrister
- Tim Ellis (magician) (born 1963), Australian magician
- Tim Ellis (engineer), American aerospace engineer and the co-founder and CEO of Relativity Space
