= Robert Richter (lawyer) =

Australian lawyer (born 1946)

Robert Richter KC
- Born: 13 February 1946 (age 80); Kirghiz Soviet Socialist Republic
- Occupation: Barrister
- Years active: 1971–present
- Known for: Representing defendants unpopular in public opinion

Robert Richter KC (born 13 February 1946) is an Australian barrister, based in Melbourne. He has handled a number of high-profile cases including defendants unpopular in public opinion. He is an adjunct professor at Victoria University. He is a critic of human rights violations and advocates for the rule of law.

== Early life and education ==
Richter was born on 13 February 1946 in the Kirghiz Republic, at that time a republic of the Soviet Union. His father was a Polish Jew, and his mother was Ukrainian; they had met there after being displaced during World War II. After living for ten years in Israel, Richter's family moved to Melbourne, Australia in 1959, following an uncle who had already established business in the textile industry. Along with the rest of his family, the 13-year-old Richter arrived in Australia with little or no English. It has been reported that he taught himself English with the aid of television programs and dictionaries.

Richter was educated at Balwyn High School. Richter was admitted to the degrees of the Bachelor of Arts, and the Bachelor of Laws with honours from the University of Melbourne in the late 1960s. Richter was Editor of the Melbourne University Law Review. He was called to the bar on 5 August 1971.

== Membership of statutory bodies and professional organisations ==
Richter was a committee member of the then Criminal Bar Association of Victoria and the Victorian Bar Council from 1997 to 1999. He was president of the Victorian Council for Civil Liberties from 1994 to 1996. In addition to his business as a barrister, Richter was also a part-time commissioner of the Law Reform Commission of Victoria from 1989 to 1992. He was appointed a silk on 26 November 1985.

== Career ==
In 1987, Richter acted for surgeon Ian McGoldrick who was indicted on 11 charges of procuring abortions contrary to the then sections 64 to 66 of the Victorian Crimes Act 1958 The case was dismissed at committal hearings, the presiding Justice following Justice Menhennitt's reasoning in 1969 matter of R v Davidson [1969] VR 667 at 670.

In 1994, Richter successfully defended Victorian Police officer Cliff Lockwood in the Supreme Court of Victoria against charges that Lockwood allegedly murdered Walsh Street police shootings suspect Gary Abdallah in 1989.

In 1996 Richter successfully defended John Elliott against charges that he allegedly illegally moved A$ 66.5 million from Elders IXL, to "Equiticorp Tasman Ltd", a shelf company Elliot was alleged to control.

In 1998 Richter led the defence for now convicted "Hoddle Street Massacre" perpetrator Julian Knight. Richter continues to represent Knight during his parole hearings on a pro-bono basis.

In 2000 and 2003, Richter acted for then ATSIC chairman Geoff Clark.

In 2002 Richter acted for Ray Williams in the HIH Insurance Royal Commission and the inter-related court cases.

In 2005, Richter successfully defended Melbourne underworld crime figure Mick Gatto against the charge of murdering suspected underworld hitman Andrew Veniamin.

In 2009, Richter successfully defended Labor minister Theo Theophanous over rape charges. In the same year, Richter represented a high school teacher who pleaded guilty to committing sexual acts against a teenage girl. During the sentencing appeal, Richter argued that the victim was a "drama queen". The appeal was successful, with Richter's client being freed.

In 2015, Richter represented an athletics coach to national champions, with extensive links to one of the country's elite Catholic schools, St Kevin's College, Melbourne Toorak, who was convicted of grooming a child under the age of 16.

In 2016, Richter represented one of the conspirators behind the 2015 Anzac Day Terror Plot, with the conspirator sentenced to seven years imprisonment, for a crime that carries a maximum sentence of life imprisonment. Richter argued that his client's "rehabilitation is in the public interest".

In 2017, Richter intervened in the case of Susan Neill-Fraser, who was convicted in 2010 of the murder of Bob Chappell, meeting with Tasmanian Premier Will Hodgman to call for an independent inquiry.

In 2017, Richter was retained by Cardinal George Pell after Pell was charged by Victoria Police in relation to multiple allegations of historical child sexual abuse. At Pell's 2019 sentencing hearing, Richter said that the case was "no more than a plain vanilla sexual penetration case where the child is not actively participating". He later issued a written apology for making the statement. Bret Walker replaced Richter as Pell's lead counsel for his subsequent appeal.

Richter announced on 24 February 2021 that he would be lead counsel for Susan Neill-Fraser on her subsequent appeal before the Supreme Court of Tasmania.

In June 2021, he acted for Witness K before the ACT Supreme Court, arguing that the former spy should not be convicted.

In 2021, he represented I Cook Foods at the High Court of Australia in a scandal named "slug gate" and won the case in 2023.

== Personal life and views ==
Richter has been described as a "progressive atheist".

== Portrait unveiling ==
A portrait of Robert Richter KC and Philip Dunn KC, painted by artist Ralph Heimans, was unveiled in 2023 and is displayed at the Victorian Bar in Melbourne, in tribute to their combined contributions to the legal profession.
