= Mortal Error =

1992 non-fiction book by Bonar Menninger and Howard Donahue

Mortal Error: The Shot That Killed JFK
- Author: Bonar Menninger
- Language: English
- Publisher: St. Martin's Press
- Publication date: May 1992
- Publication place: United States
- Media type: Print
- Pages: 361 pp (first edition, hardback or paperback)
- ISBN: 0312080743

Mortal Error: The Shot That Killed JFK is a 1992 nonfiction book by Bonar Menninger outlining a theory by sharpshooter, gunsmith, and ballistics expert Howard Donahue that a Secret Service agent accidentally fired the shot that actually killed President John F. Kennedy. Mortal Error was published by St Martin's Press in hardback, paperback, and audiobook.

Menninger is also the author of And Hell Followed With It: Life and Death in a Kansas Tornado, which won a Kansas Notable Book Award in 2011.

== Background and overview ==
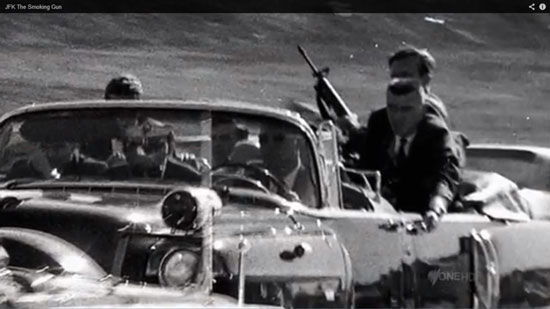
Photo showing driver and Agent George Hickey, shortly after JFK was shot, holding the AR-15 rifle that accidental-shooting theorists say killed Kennedy.

Donahue first became interested in the story of the assassination of John F. Kennedy after participating in a re-creation of the shooting as one of eleven invited marksmen and sharpshooters. He demonstrated that it would have been possible for Lee Harvey Oswald to have fired three shots in the time specified by the Warren Commission and was the only one of the eleven to better the minimum 5.6-second time window that is based on the first shot hitting Kennedy and the second shot missing. Most investigators now believe the first shot missed which allows for more time. The experience highlighted to Donahue other concerns regarding the Warren report – in particular, the fact that testimony of ballistics experts seemed to have been completely omitted from the Commission's evidence gathering.

Conducting his own investigation, Donahue eventually decided the bullet that struck Kennedy in the head had in fact been fired by United States Secret Service Special Agent George Warren Hickey Jr. (March 24, 1923 – February 25, 2005) from an AR-15 rifle carried in the car immediately following the President's vehicle. The proposed series of events is as follows: after the first shot (which hit the street) was fired, Hickey turns completely around and looks toward Oswald, who is on the sixth floor of the school book depository building. His turned head is documented in an AP photograph by James Altgens. Hickey reaches for the AR-15 under the seat, releases the safety and begins to lift the gun. The second shot is fired by Oswald, hitting the president and Texas Governor John Connally. The president's car and the follow-up car containing Hickey suddenly speed up. This is attested to by Secret Service agent Clint Hill. Hickey, who is unstable because he is standing on the cushion of the seat rather than the floor of the car begins to fall back due to the acceleration of the vehicle, pulling the trigger of the AR-15. The gun is pointed toward Kennedy at that instant and the bullet strikes him squarely in the back of the head.

In parallel, he believes Oswald's second shot through Kennedy's neck may have already critically wounded the president before the third shot was fired.

Donahue was encouraged in his investigations by Ralph Reppert, a reporter for the Baltimore Sun. In 1977, Reppert published Donahue's theory in two articles, which appeared on Sunday, May 1 and the following Sunday with the second article accompanied by an editorial. These two men were keen to collaborate on a book the subject, but this was cut short by Reppert's ill health and subsequent death. Donahue later also approached author John Davis in the hope that a book would still be written. The original copyright notice for Mortal Error read "Copyright 1992 Bonar Menninger and Howard Donahue" but some later editions did not mention Donahue's copyright. The Acknowledgements section (dated January 21, 1992) begins "Special thanks to Nick Beltrante for a great news tip, the late Ralph Reppert for showing the way, Howard and Katie Donahue for casting their lot with me ...".

Donahue's reconstruction of the trajectories of the shots that struck Kennedy and Governor Connally supported the single-bullet theory for the second shot. Donahue decided that the "impossible trajectory" suggested by the Warren Commission was only necessary because there was an error in their positioning of Connally. He also concluded this was Oswald's second shot, the first having missed due to the misalignment of the rifle's telescopic sight but with a ricochet fragment slightly wounding Kennedy and that Oswald had not fired a third shot, the third cartridge case found at the scene having been a slightly bent and empty one usually kept in the rifle's chamber.

Neither Donahue nor Menninger commented on whether the Warren Commission's key finding, that Oswald acted alone, was correct or not. Menninger notes that the theory does not preclude Oswald's involvement with a conspiracy.

== Synopsis ==
The book takes the overall form of a narrative, in which Menninger describes Donahue's enquiries over twenty-five years.

Chapter 1, A Chance Telephone Call, describes the events that led to Donahue's interest in the assassination, and a brief biography up until that point.

Chapters 2 and 3, The Warren Report and The Critics, then give the context and summary of the Warren Report, and a detailed summary of its critics as of 1968.

Chapter 4, The Single Bullet Theory presents Donahue's analysis of the shot which, according to the Warren Commission, struck both Kennedy and Connally, and suggests that the "magic bullet" trajectory is only necessary because the estimated position of the Governor was wrong. One of Oswald's shots could, it claims, therefore have caused both men's injuries as theorized, but there remain other unanswered questions.

Chapter 5, The Head Shot describes Donahue's analysis of the shot that hit Kennedy in the head, using the Warren Commission evidence (particularly the official autopsy report), stills from the Zapruder film and other photos, and holes drilled in a plaster skull. Numerous questions arise surrounding the completeness and even accuracy of the autopsy report.

... the bullet that hit Kennedy's head had not behaved like a full-metal jacketed round at all. (p. 49)

The Commission determined that all three spent shells found at the depository came from the same lot of full metaljacketed 6.5 millimeter ammunition (p. 50)

... two crippling problems with the government's claim that Lee Harvey Oswald fired the shot that hit Kennedy in the head: 1) the apparent trajectory of the bullet did not seem to match the location of Oswald's sniper's nest, and 2) the type of bullet fired was totally at odds with the rounds that Oswald was known to have used. (p. 56)

Chapter 6, A Fortuitous Encounter, describes Donahue's first correspondence with the Secret Service, and reviews the conclusions that led to his approaching them.

In just eight months, working on weekends and evenings in his cluttered basement den, he had been able to construct a rebuttal to the critics of the Commission's single bullet theory that effectively destroyed their principal arguments. More important, he was sure he'd identified two serious flaws in the Government's explanation of the head wound, flaws those same critics has [sic] missed entirely. (p. 57)

He then by chance meets Dr. Russell Fisher, who led the Clark Panel, which reviewed the autopsy in 1968, and who provides a copy of its report and many insights into details of the autopsy report and problems with the material provided to the panel. The suspicion of an accidental discharge by a Secret Service agent grows.

Well, you know more about guns than I do," he said. "But that would certainly explain the strange antics of the government." (p. 65)

Chapter 7, Kennedy's Unknown Wound, describes Donahue's conclusion that Kennedy suffered a scalp wound from a ricochet fragment from Oswald's first shot, using the material provided by Fisher. This resolves some problems with the timing of the reactions of Kennedy and Connally.

Chapter 8, Murphy's Law, resumes the story of Donahue's career as his expertise and reputation as an expert witness grow.

Chapter 9, The Discovery, describes more of Donahue's career, and his discovery of a photo showing a Secret Service agent holding a weapon that could have produced the kind of wound Kennedy suffered (the photo eventually used on the cover of the book). This revives his interest in publishing an article on his findings.

Howard here. You're not going to believe this, and God help me if I'm wrong, but I think we can do the story. I found the gun. (p. 108)

Chapter 10, Breaking News, describes the first publication of Donahue's conclusions in articles by Ralph Reppert, and attempts to contact Hickey. Questions are asked regarding the nature of the coverup, and particularly about whether Robert Kennedy was involved in it.

Chapters 11 to 13 describe Donahue's experiences with the United States House Select Committee on Assassinations.

Obviously, they had no intention of examining the evidence Howard had assembled. (p. 157)

Harold A. Rose, ... an investigator for the committee, ... informed Donahue that he'd traveled extensively around the country to question a number of Secret Service agents and police officers about what happened in Dallas. "So, did you interview Hickey?" Donahue asked. "He was right there in Washington." "No, I did not," Rose replied. "Why not?" Donahue asked. "I really don't know," Rose said finally. (pp. 186–187, describing a conversation that took place in 1983)

Chapter 14, The AR-15, describes the ill health and death of Reppert, the reporter who wrote the articles that broke the story, which ends their proposed collaboration on a book on Donahue's theory and puts the book proposal on hold. The story of the AR-15 is told, with comparisons to the M-1, AK-47, M-14, and M-16, and some very critical assessments of the adoption of the M-14 and M-16.

Do you know what killed most of us? Our own rifles ... (p. 196)

Chapter 15, The Final Breakthrough, presents more ballistics, especially estimating the size of the head shot entry wound and its relevance. John Davis, another possible author for the book, is contacted and is at first enthusiastic. Howard gives up his Masters studies in forensics but becomes increasingly employed as an expert witness despite this.

... the bullet that struck Kennedy's neck had cracked one of his vertebrae ... if Kennedy would have survived the trauma at all – something Lattimer doubted – it probably would have been only as a vegetable quadriplegic. (p. 199)

Chapter 16, Hope Dies Hard, gives a brief history of the Secret Service, their nightmare assignment guarding Kennedy, and their reaction to the shooting. There follows Hickey's involvement in the Warren Commission and statements by him and other agents. Donahue's conversation with one notable conspiracy theorist is also described.

Chapter 17, Today, is a recap as of spring 1991, describing reactions from Secret Service agents and others to the theory, and more attempts to contact Hickey.

I do not believe that George Hickey is to blame for what happened. He was a brave man trying to do his job. (p. 237, Donahue speaking)

An afterword headed Note from the Publisher describes more attempts to contact Hickey, and to discuss the theory with the Secret Service and others, and why the decision to publish the book was taken.

There are several appendices:

- Appendix A: Testimony and Written Statements by Secret Service Agents Regarding Events of November 22, 1963
- Appendix B: 1968 Panel Review of Photographs, X-Ray Films, Documents, and Other Evidence Pertaining to the Fatal Wounding of President John F. Kennedy on November 22, 1963, in Dallas, Texas
- Appendix C: Excerpts from Interviews Conducted by the House Select Committee on Assassinations with Drs. Humes, Petty, Angel, Baden, Boxwell, and Loquvam
- Appendix D: Trajectory Analysis from the House Select Committee on Assassinations Hearings

Finally, there are chapter by chapter endnotes giving sources and their bibliographic details, and an index.

== Reception ==
Reaction to Mortal Error has been mixed. James Balducki of the Associated Press cited that Donahue's "scrupulousness" made his theory of the JFK assassination plausible. Balducki praised the book, saying, "Menninger interprets the story with a sharpness and fluidity that never unravels amid the surge of detail." David Pietrusza called Donahue's theory unusual due to him not tying the assassination to Mafia, CIA, or FBI, but that there were "still problems with Donahue's theory". The Hamilton Spectator criticized Mortal Error as "missing the mark".

Pre-publication orders topped 100,000, but the book caused little impact at the time. Menninger commented in 2013 that it might be because Donahue's theory was "equally disliked by both conspiracy theorists and supporters of the Warren Commission."

Donahue died in 1999.

In 2013, Australian journalist and former police detective Colin McLaren published a book and documentary both titled JFK: The Smoking Gun, examining and supporting Donahue's theory. According to his daughter, Colleen Donahue Lorenzen of Riderwood, Mr. Donahue was working on a related book at his death. "He had discovered a TV tape in a German archive that showed the assassination from a different angle as well as a Secret Service agent standing up in a car." She also indicated her father was surprised that his work aroused so little interest.

== Hickey lawsuit ==
Prior to the publication of the book in 1992, both the publisher and the author contacted Hickey to invite his participation in the book and offering him a chance to respond to the allegations. In 1995, Hickey sued St. Martin's Press over the claims made in Mortal Error. The suit was eventually dismissed in 1997 on the grounds that Hickey had waited too long after the book's initial publication to file against the publisher. Hickey refiled suit when the paperback edition was published and later settled with St. Martin's Press in 1998 on undisclosed terms.
