= Geoffrey Bowen =

Geoff(rey) or Jeff(rey) Bowen may refer to:

- Det. Sgt. Geoffrey Bowen, character in Underbelly Files: Infiltration
- Captain Geoffrey Bowen in Battle of Wau
- Jeff Bowen (born 1971), American composer, lyricist
- Jeffrey Bowen, American record producer and songwriter
