= David McMillan (smuggler) =

British-Australian drug smuggler (born 1956)

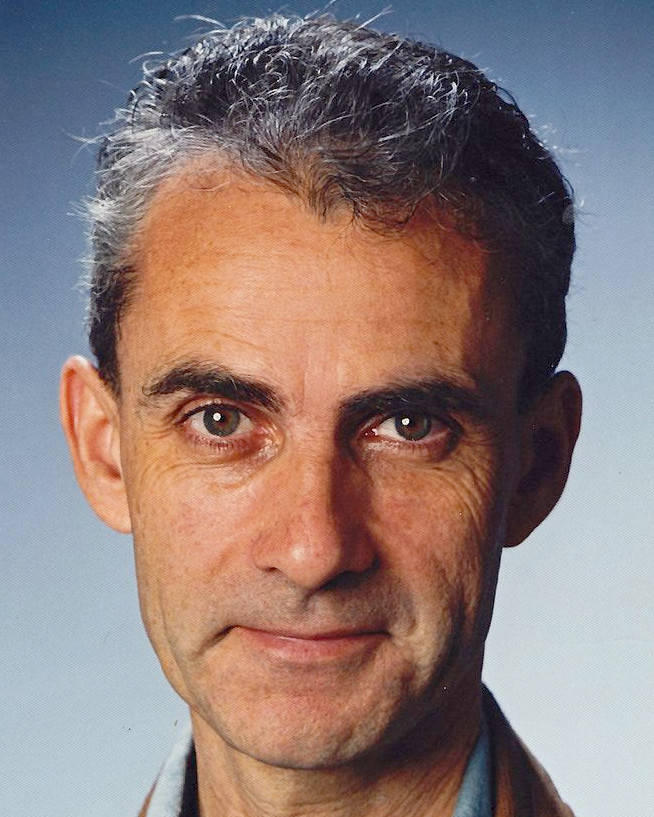
- McMillan in 2004
- Born: 9 April 1956 (age 70); London, England
- Citizenship: British
- Education: Caulfield Grammar School
- Occupations: Drug Trafficker; Author
- Years active: early 1970s to mid-2000's
- Known for: only person to successfully escape from Klong Prem Central Prison
- Notable work: Escape (2007); Escape: The Past (2012); Unforgiving Destiny (2017)
- Criminal charge: conspiracy to export heroin
- Penalty: Death by firing squad
- Wanted by: Royal Thai Police
- Time at large: 30 years
- Escaped: 19 August 1996
- Website: http://davidmcmillan.net/

David McMillan (born 1956) is a British-Australian former drug smuggler who is the only Westerner on record as having successfully escaped Bangkok's Klong Prem Central Prison. His exploits were detailed in several books and in the 2011 Australian telemovie Underbelly Files: The Man Who Got Away.

== Early life ==
McMillan was born in London, United Kingdom, England, on 9 April 1956. He is the son of John McMillan CBE, who was the controller of Associated-Rediffusion Television, and his Australian wife. After his parents separated, he immigrated to Australia with his mother and sister. McMillan attended Caulfield Grammar School in Melbourne, Victoria until he was expelled for attempting to manufacture LSD in the school chemistry lab. After leaving school, McMillan worked as a cinema projectionist an inner city cinema, where he came into contact with members of the criminal underworld.

== Criminal career ==
McMillan's job at the cinema introduceed him to a group of safe-crackers who had turned to narcotics when police surveillance curtailed their traditional profession. Connections with the free-marijuana hippie lobbyists brought those two worlds together and a tempting opportunity for McMillan, who was well-travelled. At the time, he was a distributor of the monthly magazine, The Australasian Weed, a drug-reform periodical, and advocated the complete lifting of the prohibition against drugs for recreational use. McMillan then began a career as a drug smuggler, during which he developed the bag-duplication system at Sydney Airport in the late 1970s as he smuggled hashish from India and heroin from Thailand. In 1979, McMillan fell out with disgraced peer Lord Tony Moynihan after the exiled lord attempted to trap McMillan in a gambling-sting operation using the large-scale bets of the Chinese-run cockfights in Manila. Moynihan had hoped to employ McMillan's technical expertise to detonate an explosive capsule in the necks of fighting cocks, and so determine the winners.

Moynihan planned only to swindle McMillan out of the betting stake after a test game. McMillan was alerted to the scam by his Chinese film-making friends and left the Philippines after cautioning Moynihan. Moynihan would later move on to hoodwink smuggler Howard Marks in the 1980s, resulting in Marks's conviction and imprisonment in America. Imprudent spending attracted the attention of federal police when a Clénet Coachworks car was imported from California bearing papers that had greatly undervalued the vehicle. This slip-up led to a major investigation which eventually revealed houses, businesses and properties along the eastern coast of Australia bought with cash and valued in millions of dollars. These assets later became the subject of Australia's first important confiscation of drug-earned assets. At the peak of his career in the 1980s, McMillan was a multi-millionaire and maintained homes, offices and apartments all over the world.

== Australian conviction ==
After three years, McMillan and business partner Michael Sullivan were arrested following Operation Aries, a Victoria Police/Federal Police taskforce operation reported to have cost over A$2 million. McMillan and Sullivan, along with their partners, Clelia Teresa Vigano and Mary Escolar Castillo respectively, had been arrested on 5 January 1982 for conspiracy to import heroin. The four were alleged to have 17 false passports between them and to have arranged drug mules to transport an average of 2 kilograms of heroin per trip. The group stood trial with Supahaus Chowdury and Brendan Healy on twelve counts of conspiring to import drugs between 1979 and 1981.

Healy was acquitted on all charges, and nine others accused of the conspiracy accepted indemnity against prosecution in exchange for testifying against their co-conspirators. McMillan stood accused of travelling under 30 false passports and keeping station houses in London, Brussels and Bangkok. The trial heard charges of an attempt to escape Melbourne's high-security Pentridge Prison by helicopter using former Special Air Service personnel, although McMillan would later assert the entire scheme was a false flag operation engineered by a vengeful Lord Moynihan and Operation Aries detectives in order to sway the opinion of the jury to their guilt.

The prosecution opposed bail for Castillo, who had a four-month-old baby with Sullivan, because she had access to funds and it was thought she could flee to her wealthy parents in her native Colombia. The police surgeon reported that all four defendants were habitual heroin users. Clelia Vigano and Mary Castillo were two of three women who died in a fire at HM Prison Fairlea on the evening of Saturday 6 February 1982. After her death, Castillo's baby went into the custody of Sullivan's mother.

The subsequent six-month trial produced 116 witnesses, with McMillan testifying that he was in fact smuggling diamonds from Europe to Australia. The trial resulted in a hung jury that finally returned a verdict after seven days sequestration. Despite being acquitted of 11 of the 12 counts, McMillan was found guilty of the remaining count and was sentenced to 17 years, before being released in 1993 on parole. During the trial, agents from the United States' Drug Enforcement Administration testified against the Thai national Chowdury who they believed had links to the Golden Triangle's third biggest heroin exporter, and to the 1980 kidnap and murder of the wife of DEA agent Michael Powers in Chiang Mai. McMillan denied any connection with Chowdury, and was acquitted of the relevant charge, however the American involvement led to a lifelong antipathy between the DEA and McMillan.

== Escape from Thailand ==
While on parole, McMillan flew to Thailand in December 1993, travelling on a false passport under the name "Daniel Westlake". After a close call at Don Mueang airport, he was thereafter arrested in Bangkok's Chinatown while in possession of two false passports and $50,000 in cash. Thai police had also recovered 40 grams of heroin that had been discarded at the airport Departures area, which they attributed to McMillan, and he was then charged with heroin trafficking. McMillan was held on remand to await trial in Klong Prem Central Prison, also known colloquially as the Bangkok Hilton. Klong Prem Central prison (Thai: คลองเปรม; rtgs: Khlong Prem) is a maximum security prison in Chatuchak District, Bangkok, Thailand. The prison has several separate sections and houses up to 20,000 inmates. Due to his financial status, McMillan lived more comfortably than the average inmate while in prison. McMillan had his own chef and servants, dined on food bought from the supermarket, and also had his own office, television and radio.

Facing the death penalty and a transfer to Bang Kwang Central Prison, which was considered the most notorious prison in Asia, McMillan resolved to escape. On the night of 18 August 1996 he cut his cell window bars with hacksaws, scaled seven inner walls, then mounted the electric fence topped 9 meter outer wall using a bamboo-pole ladder, before abseiling down on a makeshift rope just as dawn was breaking.. McMillan changed into civilian clothes and carried an opened umbrella as he walked away from the prison, the main purpose of which was to hide his white face from guards in watchtowers and tricking them into thinking he was a fellow colleague. McMillan credits the umbrella with helping him escape, saying that "escaping prisoners don't carry umbrellas". Within four hours of escaping the prison McMillan had boarded a plane to Singapore using a false passport, narrowly evading pursuing prison authorities. He later stated that there was "nothing better than the suction sound of an aeroplane door being sealed." Future Australian attorney-general Robert McClelland when praising Australia's embassy in Thailand remarked that McMillan: "… a prisoner... escaped from the Thai jail in quite exceptional and athletic circumstances. In terms of mere escape, it was really quite an achievement."

== Re-establishment of smuggling career ==
After a few days in Singapore waiting for a new false passport and matching credit cards to be mailed to him, McMillan travelled to Balouchistan, Pakistan where he lived for a number of months under the protection of Mir Noor Jehan Magsi of the Magsi clan. He then moved to London and eventually sold a kilogram of pure heroin he smuggled from Pakistan to a contact in Stockholm, thereafter using the £100,000 he received as seed capital to begin personally moving cocaine from Colombia to Scandinavia. Although McMillan would have preferred to have continued trafficking heroin via the thousands of daily flights from Asia to Western Europe, the rise of the Taliban had severely disrupted the heroin trade in the Golden Crescent. He therefore developed a system of island hopping first to Curaçao then to the French territory of Saint Martin, before finally catching a transfer flight upon landing at Charles de Gaulle Airport so as to avoid the intense customs checks awaiting the few dozen Americas origin flights.

== Arrest in Pakistan ==
In the summer of 1998, McMillan travelled to Kabul to negotiate the release of a nephew of Lord Magsi, who had been arrested after refusing to be conscripted for the Taliban's upcoming attack on Mazar-i-Sharif. While attempting to return to London afterwards, McMillan was arrested at Lahore Airport after being falsely accused of the attempted export of narcotics. McMillan was then flown to Karachi and imprisoned at the headquarters of the Ministry of Narcotics Control, where he was severely beaten with a cane on the soles of his feet and subjected to electric shocks during interrogation. A British High Commission officer visited McMillan to inform him that a week earlier a former drug mule of his named Billy Green had been caught with two kilograms of heroin at Jinnah International Airport and had accused McMillan of masterminding the entire operation.

McMillan was then transferred to Karachi Central Jail to be held on remand. This jail maintained a class system for prisoners, through which McMillan kept servants and private rooms. Due to a financial dispute with the prison superintendent, McMillan was transferred at night to Chanchalguda Central Jail in Hyderabad, where he was kept in the dungeons until being rescued by Lord Magsi. After negotiating his transfer to a better prison wing, Lord Magsi revealed that, after being pressured by his associates, Billy Green had pleaded guilty to the heroin exportation charges and been sentenced to 5 years in prison. McMillan was eventually released on bail and returned to London in December 1999.

== Return to England ==
In late 2000, McMillan was arrested in Denmark while trying to help a former associate who had been captured onboard a Gwadar originating ship attempting to land several tonnes of hashish, which had been tracked to Europe by American surveillance agencies monitoring the Dubai Jebel Ali Free Zone in the aftermath of the USS Cole bombing. Whilst clearing out his associate's secure locker at a Copenhagen storage facility, McMillan was detained by several plain clothes police officers, and eventually served 12 months in prison for the alleged possession of 800 grams of cocaine discovered in the storage unit.

McMillan was arrested at Heathrow Airport in 2002 for smuggling 500 grams of class A drugs, and served two years in prison. His Thai warrant for heroin trafficking remained outstanding, as did a warrant in Australia for breach of parole. In April 2012, McMillan was arrested again in the Orpington district of London, in an operation referred to Bromley police by the UK Border Agency concerning an ounce of heroin mailed from Pakistan. In the consequent trial, an undercover policewoman testified to delivering a package from which thirty grams of Asian heroin had been removed. McMillan had not opened the parcel, addressed to a previous resident, and denied any knowledge of the unidentified sender. However, a search of his house using sniffer dogs uncovered several small packets of heroin, along with cutting agents and a set of electronic scales. After a six-day trial McMillan was sentenced at Croydon Crown Court to six years' imprisonment for the evasion of the prohibition on importing A-class drugs. McMillan was released in 2014.

In November, 2014, Thailand formally began extradition proceedings against McMillan in London. He was arrested at the request of the Thai government, and held at Wandsworth prison. A long-running challenge began at the Westminster Magistrates Court headed by defence barrister Tim Owen, QC. Evidence was presented detailing human-rights abuses under the rule of the Thai generals who had staged a coup in May of that year, as well as expert evidence on Thai prison conditions. However, Judge Arbuthnot ruled against McMillan, as did the UK Home Secretary. Two weeks before McMillan was due to be sent back to Bangkok, the Thai authorities withdrew their request, stating technical reasons. McMillan was released from prison for the final time in September 2016.

== Media ==
As a 12-year-old, McMillan appeared nightly on the Nine Network's 'Peters Junior News', presenting news stories for children in a regular 5-minute TV bulletin.

McMillan detailed his escape from Klong Prem in his 2008 autobiography Escape. In June 2009, he appeared as a guest in a 50-minute episode of Danny Dyer's Deadliest Men 2: Living Dangerously, which aired on Bravo TV. The episode presented McMillan as having settled peacefully with his partner Jeanette and children.

In 2011, Australia's Nine Network produced and aired Underbelly Files: The Man Who Got Away. The third in the Underbelly Files series, the film was based on McMillan's smuggling, arrest, imprisonment in Bangkok and briefly outlined his escape from Klong Prem. An accompanying book, McVillain: the Man Who Got Away was published by Pan Macmillan in April 2011.

In late April 2017, McMillan published Unforgiving Destiny - The Relentless Pursuit of a Black Marketeer, a second autobiography detailing his experiences in Afghanistan and Thailand and his 2016 trial. David McMillan narrated his autobiographical work, Unforgiving Destiny, which has been listed as an audiobook with Audible in July, 2021.

In 2022, McMillan sat down for a two part YouTube video series with LADbible, where he describes his early life & criminal career leading up to his arrest in Thailand and a detailed account of his escape from Klong Prem prison.

== See also ==
- List of Caulfield Grammar School people
