= Alex Andreas (Australian actor) =

Australian actor

- Born: Australia
- Occupation: Actor
- Years active: 2002–present

Alex Andreas, previously Alex Tsitsopoulos, is an Australian actor known for his roles in television, film and theatre.

His first big role was as Ross Papasavas in Short Cuts. His recent credits include Dimitri in the mystery thriller The Tourist and George Stathopoulos in the crime comedy-drama My Life is Murder.

Stage roles include Hotel Bonegilla (La Mama, 2018), Ironbound (Q44 Theatre, 2018) and Brother Boy (The Dancing Dog Cafe, 2007)

== Filmography ==
=== Television appearances ===
Year	Title	Role	Notes
2002	Guinevere Jones	Lancelot	Episode: "Love Hurts"
2002	Short Cuts	Ross Papasavas	24 episodes
2010	Lowdown	Zirco	Episode: "Zirco Goes Berko"
2012–2017	Neighbours	Sam Feldman / Nick Holmes	7 episodes
2013–2020	Wentworth	Detective Kanellis / Tim Howard	3 episodes
2014	Fat Tony & Co.	Milad Mokbel	7 episodes
2015	Gallipoli	Mehmet Ozkan	2 episodes
2015	Miss Fisher's Murder Mysteries	Roberto Salvatore	Episode: "Murder & Mozzarella"
2016	Hyde & Seek	Nick Petrides	1 episode
2018	Underbelly Files: Chopper	Detective Hendry	2 episodes
2018	Tidelands	Lev Nuyland	6 episodes
2019–2021	My Life Is Murder	George Stathopoulos	9 episodes
2022	The Tourist	Dimitri	6 episodes
2023	Ten Pound Poms	Nick	3 episodes
2024	High Country	Nico Dracos	1 episode

=== Film appearances ===
Year	Title	Role	Notes
2017	Tracy	David	
2012	Peek a Boo	Marty	
2010	Hating Alison Ashley	Homie	
