= Murder of Bob Chappell =

2009 murder in Hobart, Tasmania, Australia

- Date: 26 January 2009
- Location: Hobart, Tasmania, Australia
- Convictions: Susan Neill-Fraser: 23 years without parole for 11 years, 6 months for murder of Bob Chappell

The murder of Bob Chappell occurred on 26 January 2009 in Hobart, Tasmania, Australia. Robert Adrian (Bob) Chappell, the de facto partner of Susan Blyth (Sue) Neill-Fraser, disappeared from their yacht, Four Winds; his body was never found. Neill-Fraser was found guilty of his murder in 2010. Various appeals have all been dismissed.

== Background ==
Bob Chappell (65), a radiation oncology medical physicist from Hobart, and his partner of 18 years, Susan Neill-Fraser (born 3 March 1954), were the owners of a 16-metre (53 foot) ketch called Four Winds. The yacht had been purchased in Queensland in September 2008 and had been brought to Hobart in December 2008. From about 9 am on 26 January 2009, Chappell was on the yacht while it was moored in the River Derwent off Marieville Esplanade, Sandy Bay for the purpose of working on it. Neill-Fraser was with him for a short time in the morning and returned at about 2 pm, using the yacht's tender, a white inflatable dinghy. Later in the afternoon she returned to the shore in the tender, while Chappell remained on the yacht. During the trial, counsel for the Crown argued (and the court agreed) that Neill-Fraser had killed the deceased and left his body on the yacht when she went home for the evening, going back out to the yacht later the same night to dispose of the body and clean up incriminating evidence, returning around 3 a.m. when the house telephone was used to check for missed calls. A contrasting suggested scenario that a stranger or strangers to the deceased killed Chappell on the boat, and in addition removed his body from the scene, was dismissed at the original trial, and although possible evidence pointing in this direction has been subject of various subsequent claims and counter-claims, it has never been found to provide sufficient grounds for a successful appeal against the original conviction. This has not stopped a contingent of Tasmanians, including some prominent persons such as Andrew Wilkie and Lara Giddings, continuing to advocate that Neill-Fraser was in fact innocent (or at least, doubt surrounds her conviction that was not presented at the original trial) and she should be exonerated of the crime for which she was convicted.

== The investigation ==
=== The dinghy and initial alert ===
Between 11:30 pm and midnight on 26 January, witness John Hughes was parked at the end of rowing sheds at Marieville Esplanade when he saw and heard an inflatable dinghy with an outboard motor on the back coming from the direction of the Royal Yacht Club, heading northeast towards the Eastern Shore of the Derwent, roughly towards Four Winds. Hughes said that there was only one person in it who had the outline of a female, but he could not be definite.

At about 5:40 am the next day, a different witness found the dinghy bobbing against rocks. The witness secured it. With another man, he headed out in a boat. As they passed Four Winds, they noticed that it was very low in the water on its mooring. They boarded it. Shortly after, members of Tasmania Police arrived as a result of a call.

=== Police board Four Winds and search for Chappell ===
When police boarded Four Winds that morning they noticed blood on steps, a knife on the floor of the wheelhouse and a torch with blood on it. There was no trace of Chappell. The yacht was low in the water and sinking. The causes were located. A pipe to the forward toilet had been cut allowing seawater to flow in. It was also discovered that a seacock under the flooring in the forward part of the yacht had been opened, allowing seawater to flow in.

Police experienced in marine and rescue services and with water craft took the view that the person responsible for cutting the pipe and opening the seacock had an intimate knowledge of Four Winds, particularly in the case of the seacock, which was under a carpet and panel, and which served no apparent purpose.

Divers searched an area around Four Winds and to the south of it. Because of poor visibility, it was impossible for the divers to find objects on the bottom. As a consequence, sonar equipment was used in April 2009 to search roughly the same area. Ninety items of interest were located with the sonar. Only 25 of them were dived on. They were not the body of Chappell.

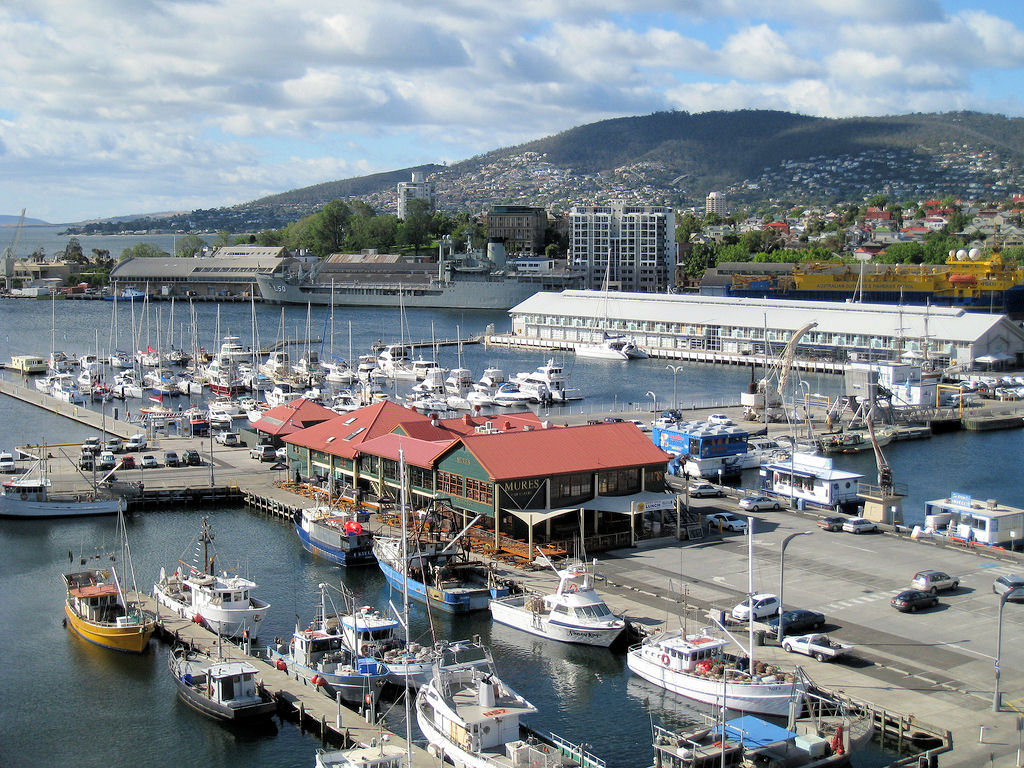
Constitution Dock

After water had been pumped from it, Four Winds was towed to Constitution Dock on 27 January. At about 4:30 pm, Neill-Fraser and others went on board. Neill-Fraser pointed out a number of anomalies on the yacht. She said that a green rope on the starboard side was in disarray and out of place. She pointed out that a winch handle was in the winch on the main mast and said that it should not have been there. She said that a rope around the winch had been cut and also another rope in a pile on the deck. In the main saloon area she pointed out that a fire extinguisher was missing from a bracket. She also pointed out that an EPIRB was missing from a bracket mounted on the back of the wheelhouse.

=== Forensic testing of Four Winds and dinghy ===
The inflatable dinghy had many areas that were positive to luminol, a screening test for blood but not a conclusive one.

On 28 January 2009 the yacht was moved to the premises of Cleanlift Marine at Goodwood and was placed on a slip for inspection. In the following days, a great number of items, samples and swabs were collected, and many were forensically examined or analysed. One was a swab taken on about 30 January 2009 9.45 metres from the bow of the yacht on the starboard walkway, while it was at Goodwood.

The swab was taken because at that point a luminol test was positive, although it ultimately proved negative for blood. DNA analysis of the swab revealed a full DNA profile of a then-unknown female. It did not match the DNA of any individual on the Tasmanian DNA database. Statistically there was a less than one in one hundred million chance that the DNA profile of more than one person, unrelated to each other, would have matched it. There was no evidence establishing how that DNA profile came to be in a substance on the deck of the yacht on 30 January 2009.

=== The accounts given by Neill-Fraser ===
==== The 28 January 2009 declaration ====
On 28 January 2009 Neill-Fraser made a statutory declaration in which she said that after tying up the dinghy at the Royal Yacht Club she went to Bunnings for a long time, although she did not buy anything, just browsed. It was starting to get dark when she arrived home. She mentioned the telephone calls she made and received and said she got off the telephone at 10:30 pm. That accorded with records. She said that she stayed alone at home that night and that the following morning she was notified the yacht was sinking. She made no mention of travelling to Marieville Esplanade after 10:30 pm.

==== The 5 February 2009 discussion with police ====
On 5 February 2009, she told Constable Marissa Milazzo and Detective Senior Constable Shane Sinnitt that after she left Four Winds on 26 January she went straight out to Bunnings. She said she drove in, turned left and parked facing the building, arriving at roughly 4:40 pm at the main entrance near the checkouts. She said there was always someone at the door and that she was wearing a cream brimmed hat, beige shorts, joggers and sunglasses. She said she looked at timber and slip mats, turned right and looked at the paint section. She went up just about every aisle and left by the same entrance.

==== The 4 March 2009 police interview ====
When interviewed by police on 4 March 2009, she continued to maintain that she drove to Bunnings from the Yacht Club. She said she remembered feeling guilty when doing so because she thought that if the deceased telephoned her, he had her mobile and she was not at home. However, she was aware that police had examined CCTV footage at Bunnings and could not find her on it and retreated to claiming that she was "pretty sure" she had gone there. She was told that Bunnings shut that day at 6 pm, which made it unlikely that she could have been there for “hours” as she had previously claimed.

In her original statutory declaration, Neill-Fraser had stated: "I stayed alone at home that night. I made several phone calls and received a call from Richard King over some family matters. It was ten thirty pm when I got off the phone.". According to a separate source, she "said she had received an un-nerving phone call from a man called Richard King, a friend of Claire Chappell, Bob Chappell's daughter. She said he told her Claire ... had been having fantasies [i.e., premonitions, elsewhere given simply as "a bad feeling"] that something was going to happen to Bob on the yacht." Another account states that "Richard King [who was previously unknown to Neill-Fraser] wanted to call Bob up and sort of warn him or tell him about this." In a report of King's own account given later in court, he said that he told Neill-Fraser that Clare [sic] was "becoming more concerned about Mr Chappell's health and the safety of boats": "I said that if Clare was to contact her trying to get access to the yacht, she should deny it ... I also said that Clare was fearful of the yacht... she was worried about her father dying." (Note: The telephone call from Richard King is obviously quite significant in this case; in the later of Neill-Fraser's several accounts it is given as the reason for her late night excursion back to Marieville Esplanade to perform a visual check on the boat from a distance (her conclusion being that since the boat was dark, everything was fine), while according to the prosecution case, it provided the impetus for her to return to the boat and dispose of the body lest it be found by anyone following up on daughter Claire's hunch ("bad feeling"). The strange synchronicity of the daughter's feeling that her father's life was in danger in some way, with the timing of his actual presumed attack and murder, has never been satisfactorily explained.)

Later in that interview Neill-Fraser maintained that she did not leave her home on the night of 26 January after receiving the telephone call from Richard King.

==== The 8 or 10 March 2009 telephone call ====
Chappell's sister Caroline Sanchez gave evidence that on either 8 or 10 March 2009, she had a telephone conversation with Neill-Fraser, in the course of which Neill-Fraser told her that on the night of 26 January she was disturbed or anxious about the content of the telephone call from Richard King and had driven down to Sandy Bay, looked across at the yacht, but it was in darkness, and then drove back. That was the first occasion upon which the appellant had admitted to returning to Marieville Esplanade that night.

==== The 13 March 2009 ABC interview ====
On 13 March 2009, she was interviewed by an ABC journalist, Felicity Ogilvie. She told Ogilvie that after the telephone call from King she drove down to the boat to check that everything was okay, did not see anything going on at the yacht and drove home. She added that she saw homeless people with fires while down there. Ogilvie later provided that information to police. It was the first time they were aware that the appellant had returned to Marieville Esplanade on the night in question.

==== The 23 March 2009 telephone call ====
On 23 March 2009, Caroline Sanchez had another telephone conversation with Neill-Fraser in which the appellant said that although she had driven down to Marieville Esplanade that night, she left the car there and walked back home to West Hobart for the exercise. It was the first time she said she had left the car at Marieville Esplanade.

==== The 5 May 2009 police interview ====
Police interviewed her again on 5 May 2009. Asked about what she had done on the afternoon of 26 January after going out to Four Winds, she said that she had been mistaken about going to Bunnings, claiming that she had mixed up the day with another day a few days earlier when she had left the deceased on board the yacht and gone to the store.

During the same interview, she said she had been on the yacht on the afternoon of 26 January until later than she had previously indicated, and after tying the dinghy at the Royal Yacht Club, she walked back to Allison Street, West Hobart, leaving the car on Marieville Esplanade or around the corner in Margaret Street, she could not remember which. She said she did not remember whether it was daylight or dark. After the telephone call from King, the content of which had unnerved her, she decided to collect the car and drive it home so that it would be available to her to drive to the yacht if the deceased called her. She decided not to telephone him because having regard to the lateness of the hour, he might be asleep. So she walked to the car at or near Marieville Esplanade. However, on arriving there she found she had farm keys and not the car keys and had to walk back to Allison Street to collect them and return once again to the car. (Note: Using Google Maps, the shortest distance between Marieville Esplanade and Allison Street is given as approximately 2.7 kilometers, and according to this account she walked the route three times in quick succession, a total of some 8 km.) She then drove along to the rowing sheds, which was the only place from which the boat could be seen properly. She got out, walked down to the beach and saw a fire going and homeless people there. She could not see the boat because it was pitch black. She felt a lot better for having gone there. She then drove home.

In that interview, Neill-Fraser was told that the red jacket police had shown her on the morning of 27 January was in fact hers because it contained her DNA. She conceded it was hers and said she had no idea how it came to be on the fence in Margaret Street.

=== Laying of the murder charge ===
On 20 August 2009, Neill-Fraser returned home from a consultation with her family lawyer, to find police at her home, waiting to arrest her. She was then arrested and was charged with murder.

=== Sample matched to Meaghan Vass ===
On 15 March 2010, when legal proceedings were underway, the DNA profile of the then-unknown female from the bow of the yacht on the starboard walkway was matched with the DNA profile of one Meaghan Vass. A sample had been taken from her by police for reasons unconnected with this case.

== Trial ==
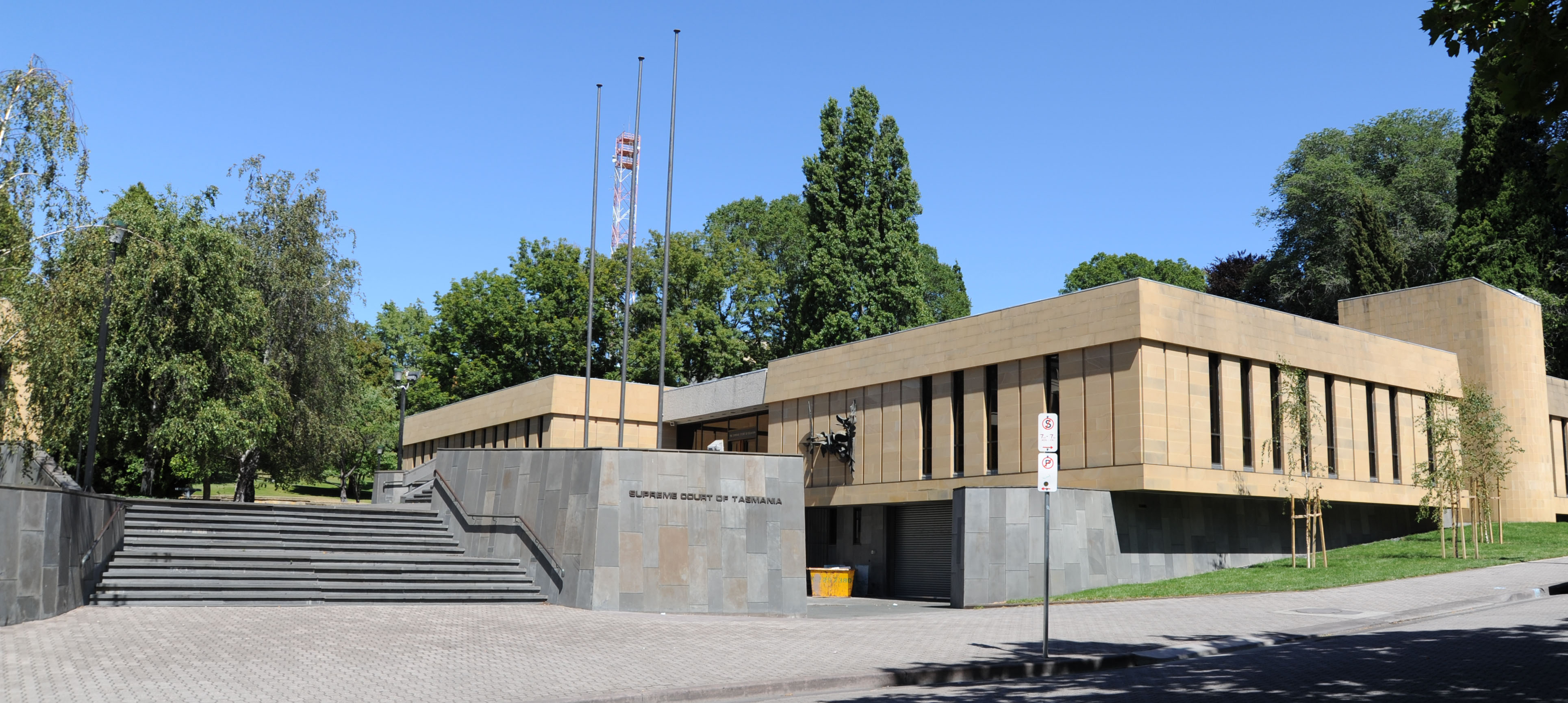
Supreme Court of Tasmania building in Hobart

The trial commenced in August 2010 before Justice Alan Blow in the Criminal Court of the Supreme Court of Tasmania. Tim Ellis SC and Jack Shapiro appeared for the State of Tasmania. David Gunson SC and Louise Brooks appeared for Neill-Fraser. During the trial it emerged that police had bugged Neill-Fraser's home and obtained some 768 hours' worth of recordings, none of which was played to the court.

Detective Shane Sinnitt admitted that police had not followed up the possibility that a grey dinghy, different from the blue and white dinghy owned by Neill-Fraser, had been seen heading in the direction of Four Winds on 26 January 2009.

=== Vass on the Basha inquiry ===
During the course of the trial, it was established that Meaghan Vass had been 15 years old on 26 January 2009. She had been homeless since she was 13. Having discovered the matching profiles, police first spoke to her with a view to interviewing her, to see if she had any connection with the death of the deceased. She declined to be interviewed. In cross-examination her explanation was that she felt intimidated and that she had "just never dealt with something this large before".

As it was not possible to provide a statement of the evidence she would give before the jury, what has come to be known as a Basha inquiry was conducted in the absence of the jury. Its purpose was to determine what she was likely to say or not say in evidence before the jury.

In her evidence-in-chief in the course of the Basha inquiry, she said she was living in Hobart in early 2009, that she had never been aboard Four Winds, she did not remember if she went to the area of Constitution Dock in January and February 2009, and she did not remember going to an area of Goodwood near Negara Crescent where there was an industrial estate and some yachts in January 2009. She was briefly cross-examined. First, she was asked where she was living in January 2009. She said she was "pretty sure" she was living at a Montrose women's shelter, which she named. The appellant's counsel asked: "Pretty sure?" She answered: "Yes, I can't really remember, I'm sorry". She said she had no occupation at the time and received a special benefit. She confirmed that she had never been on board Four Winds and she had no memory of being in the wharf area of Constitution Dock and seeing the yacht there. She agreed with defence counsel that the wharf area was not an area she would go to in late January 2009, and that it was highly unlikely she was around Constitution Dock on about 27 or 28 January 2009. She confirmed she had no memory of going to a shipyard in Negara Crescent, Goodwood called Cleanlift Marine and agreed that she had never been there in her life.

=== Vass before the jury ===
Immediately after, Vass gave evidence in the presence of the jury. Her evidence-in-chief was brief once again. She said she did not remember ever being on the yacht, being in the Constitution Dock area at the end of January or the very beginning of February 2009, or being at that time in the area of Negara Crescent, Goodwood where there were some yachts on slips and an industrial estate. She was cross-examined again. She said she did not have a twin sister and gave her reason for not being interviewed by police. She said she was quite sure she had never been on the yacht. Her evidence concluded with testimony that she had never been to the industrial premises called Cleanlift Marine at Negara Crescent at Goodwood, and most definitely was not there in late January or early February 2009.

=== The application to recall Vass ===
On the day after Vass gave evidence, Gunson SC applied to have her recalled as a witness. Since she had given evidence, counsel had received information that Detective Sinnitt had been informed by a member of staff at a women's shelter in New Town that Vass was listed as a person who would be staying there on the evening of 26 January 2009, but she had told the staff that she wanted to sleep over at Unit 8 at an address she gave at Mount Nelson. The information was that she left the New Town shelter at 3:50 pm with an arrangement that she would telephone later with the telephone number of the person with whom she would be staying at Mount Nelson, but she failed to do so.

Ellis SC refused to recall her, and the trial judge declined to take any step to compel her attendance.

=== The State's closing argument ===
The Crown case concluded after three weeks. In closing arguments, Ellis SC argued that:

- It made no sense, and it was not a reasonable possibility, that a stranger or strangers to the deceased not only killed him but in addition removed his body from the scene by using a winch. It was argued that the person who cut the pipe to the for'ard toilet and opened the seacock under the floor must have had an intimate knowledge of the yacht and was not a stranger to it. The jury's attention was drawn to the evidence that the appellant had that knowledge.
- It was too much of a coincidence for a stranger to have not only boarded the yacht and killed the deceased, but in addition to have used the yacht's tender to enable those things to be done, a tender which the appellant said she had left tied up to a ladder at the yacht club. It was argued that the use of a winch to remove the body of the 64 kilogram deceased was more consistent with one person being involved rather than several.
- The evidence showed that there was an attempt to clean up the scene of the killing and that a stranger would not have done that. Counsel for the Crown was referring to the evidence that carpet tiles in front of the electrical panel, where the appellant said the deceased was working that day, had been taken up after first unscrewing feet from stairs that were on top of the tiles.
- The jury could infer that the appellant had killed the deceased and left his body on the yacht when she went home in the evening and commenced to make and receive telephone calls at 9:17 pm. It was argued that the telephone call from Richard King unnerved her because he had wanted to speak to the deceased and instead learned that he was not available. As a result, it was argued, the appellant went to the boat to dispose of the body and clean up incriminating evidence. It was pointed out that the evidence of Hughes assisted a finding that the appellant used the dinghy to return to the yacht at about 11:30 pm to midnight, and that the evidence of the *10# call at 3:08 am was consistent with her having just returned home and checking who might have telephoned while she was out.
- In the days and months following the killing of the deceased, the appellant told a great number of lies concerning her movements that day and night, in the course of which she kept changing her position, and that the jury should conclude that they were told out of a consciousness of guilt, knowing that the truth would reveal it.

=== Verdict ===
On 15 October 2010, Neill-Fraser was found guilty by unanimous verdict.

== Penalty phase ==
On 27 October 2010 Neill-Fraser was sentenced to 26 years' imprisonment with a non-parole period of 18 years for the murder of Bob Chappell.

In sentencing Neill-Fraser, Justice Blow said:

I have had the opportunity to observe Ms Neill-Fraser during two very long police interviews. DVD recordings of both interviews were played during the trial. Ms Neill-Fraser also gave evidence at the trial over several days. She seems to me to be clever, very cool-headed, and well able to control her emotions. In my view Ms Neill-Fraser would not have attacked Mr Chappell unless she intended to kill him, had a substantial reason for killing him, was confident that she would succeed in killing him, and had a strategy to avoid punishment. This was not a killing that occurred because of a loss of self-control. It was not a crime of passion. It was an intentional and purposeful killing. I am satisfied beyond reasonable doubt that Ms Neill-Fraser deliberately killed Mr Chappell for a reason, and that that reason had to do with her financial betterment.

— Justice Blow, Tasmania v Neill-Fraser, Comments on Passing Sentence from 27 October 2010

== Coroner's report ==
On 17 January 2014, after reviewing both the transcript of the trial and the subsequent appeal by Susan Neill-Fraser to the Court of Criminal Appeal, as well as newly documented consideration therein of "a significant amount of new material [which] has been provided on Ms Neill-Fraser's behalf", the coroner Mr Glen Hay stated that he agreed with the findings from the trial and declined the need for a separate inquest. His report states: "In regard to how the death occurred, there is no other cogent material to suggest it occurred other than was found in the criminal proceedings. In regards to the identity of persons who may have contributed to the cause of death or assisted in the disposal of the body, there is no acceptable, credible or cogent evidence to suggest any person other than Ms Neill-Fraser was involved. ... I adopt the findings in the criminal proceedings that Mr Chappell was killed following an attack by Ms Neill-Fraser when they were on board the vessel Four Winds when it was anchored at Battery Point in Hobart and that he must have been either dead or deeply unconscious when his body was placed into the sea at or near that place. The cause of his death by asphyxia due to drowning cannot be ruled out. I find that his death occurred somewhere between late afternoon/early evening of 26 January 2009 and the early hours of 27 January 2009. ... I can make no findings that any person other than Ms Susan Neill-Fraser, contributed to the cause of death of Mr Chappell."

== Appellate proceedings ==
=== First appeal ===
An appeal against the conviction and sentence to the Court of Criminal Appeal was heard on 11 August 2011. Michael Croucher SC appeared for Neill-Fraser, and Tim Ellis and Jack Shapiro appeared for the State of Tasmania.

One of the grounds of appeal related to the failure to recall Meaghan Vass for further cross-examination by defence counsel. It was specifically argued that the fact that the DNA profile from the yacht matched that of Vass raised two possibilities in support of the defence case. One was that she was on the yacht at or about the time of the death of the deceased and was responsible for it, or had personal knowledge of facts material to a determination of who was responsible. The other was that she was responsible for, or a party to, a break-in on the yacht on 10 January 2009, which the appellant claimed had taken place. The Court noted that Gunson SC had, at trial, the opportunity to ask Vass questions that directly related to those two possibilities when he cross-examined her, but that the only question of that kind asked of her was: "Are you quite sure you've never been on board this boat?" The Court of Criminal Appeal rejected the argument that a miscarriage of justice had occurred as a result of the failure to recall Vass.

Other technical grounds of appeal against conviction relating to the directions given by Justice Blow to the jury were also dismissed. In respect of the appeal against sentence, the Court upheld the appeal on the basis that the sentence was manifestly excessive, and substituted a sentence of 23 years' imprisonment from 20 August 2009, with a non-parole period of 13 years.

=== High Court special leave application ===
A special leave application in respect of the conviction to the High Court of Australia was heard and refused on 7 September 2012.

=== Second appeal (leave to appeal) ===
Following an amendment to the Criminal Code Act 1924, Neill-Fraser was allowed to seek leave for a second appeal on the basis of “fresh and compelling evidence”.

During the leave application, Tom Percy QC for Neill-Fraser argued that since the trial, Meaghan Vass had in 2017 made a statutory declaration to the effect that her evidence at trial was false, that she had been aboard Four Winds on 26 January 2009 with others whom she was scared to name, and that Neill-Fraser was not present.

When the Court came to receive sworn evidence from Meaghan Vass on the appeal, she denied ever having been on Four Winds on Australia Day or at any other time, and could provide no explanation as to how DNA matching hers was found on the yacht.

During the hearing of the appeal it was alleged by the State of Tasmania that a former detective, Colin McLaren, had fabricated the statutory declaration and had come up with a plan to pay Vass $10,000 for adopting the declaration. It was also alleged that Neill-Fraser herself had attempted to cause Vass to sack her then solicitor, Fabiano Cangelosi, because Cangelosi was expected to ask Vass whether the statutory declaration was the product of coercion.

The court also heard from forensic expert Maxwell Jones, who testified that the DNA match to Vass was likely the result of a primary deposit of her biological fluid, and not from a momentary touch or a secondary transfer.

After the court had adjourned to consider its decision on the leave application, Vass gave an interview with Nine Network's 60 Minutes, in which she admitted detailed knowledge of events on the yacht apparently leading to the death of Chappell. The airing of the interview was followed by an application to reopen Neill-Fraser's case, which was granted, with a further affidavit from Vass being read into evidence. The affidavit deposed that Vass was present on the yacht with two identified male companions. She witnessed at least one of the males assault Chappell. She recalled seeing a lot of blood, and could not recall leaving the yacht or what happened after the assault. Justice Helen Wood later ordered that the Nine Network deliver up to Neill-Fraser's solicitors all video footage, including material not used when Vass' interview went to air.

As a consequence of a further police investigation prior to the hearing of the leave application, three other persons were charged with offences connected with the obtaining of evidence exculpatory of Neill-Fraser. Solicitor Jeffrey Thompson was charged with perverting the course of justice as a result of a photoboard identification procedure conducted by him with a potential eyewitness, Stephen Gleeson. Stephen Gleeson himself was charged with two counts of perverting the course of justice and pleaded guilty, receiving a sentence of 12 months imprisonment, without parole for 6 months. Karen Keefe was charged with two charges of perverting the course of justice and one of corrupting a witness. Police alleged that she provided false evidence in an affidavit as part of Neill-Fraser's appeal, agreeing to accept nearly $100,000 in return for an understanding another witness would give false evidence. Thompson was later discharged from all proceedings against him, as a result of a pretrial ruling by Justice Michael Brett.

On 21 March 2019, Neill-Fraser succeeded in obtaining leave to appeal. In granting leave, the Court said:

On the hearing of an application for leave, I am not required to make a final or positive determination about that question. The requirement for leave is that I am satisfied that the applicant has a "reasonable case to present to the court in support of the ground of appeal". I would therefore have to be satisfied that the case, which includes such evidence, is a reasonable one to present in support of the ground. In practical terms, in the circumstances of this case, I would need to be satisfied that there is a reasonable possibility that the Court of Criminal Appeal would accept the said evidence as credible and providing a trustworthy basis for fact-finding. Clearly, I could not be so satisfied if the evidence was so lacking in credibility that there was no reasonable possibility of that conclusion being reached by the Court of Criminal Appeal. Otherwise, it does not appear to me that the question of credibility falls for my consideration on this application. In this case, I am satisfied that the applicant has a reasonable case to present to the Court in support of the ground of appeal, and that it is in the interests of justice for leave to be granted. The fresh and compelling evidence to which this decision refers is the evidence of the out of court representations of Ms Vass. Insofar as it has been submitted that the evidence is not reliable, I am satisfied that it would be reasonably open to the Court of Criminal Appeal to accept such evidence as credible and providing a trustworthy basis for fact finding. I reiterate that I am not making a positive determination to that effect.

— Justice Brett, Neill-Fraser v Tasmania [2019] TASSC 10 at [53-54]

=== Second appeal (determination of the second appeal) ===
Following disruptions due to COVID-19, the determination of the second appeal was set down for 1 March 2021. On 24 February 2021 it was announced that Tom Percy QC was no longer leading counsel for Neill-Fraser, and that prominent Melbourne barrister, Robert Richter QC, would lead Neill-Fraser's legal team.

During her evidence in chief on 1 March, Vass testified that she had got on board Four Winds with her then-boyfriend, teenager Samuel Devine, whom she accused of having killed Bob Chappell: “Bob had told Sam and that to get off the boat, 'what are you doing?' ... That's when Samuel started flipping, got a bit angry, and lashed out. All I remember was seeing a lot of blood and arguing for about 30 minutes.”

Under cross-examination by Director of Public Prosecutions, Darryl Coates SC, Vass conceded that she had never even been on Four Winds at all, and alleged that she had been continually harassed since 2016 to testify and exonerate Neill-Fraser. The recanting of her evidence drew an admission from Richter that “We are in a situation in which we agree that the evidence of Vass cannot support the motion of fresh and compelling evidence leading to a miscarriage of justice... We do not abandon the notion of the DNA evidence of being capable of providing the evidence for this court to say there has been a miscarriage of justice.”

The hearing of the appeal concluded on 3 March 2021 with evidence relating to the DNA sample matching Vass, including the likelihood of the sample having been deposited otherwise than by Ms Vass' presence on Four Winds. The Court reserved its decision.

On 30 November 2021, the Court handed down its decision, with Justices Helen Wood and Robert Pearce dismissing the appeal by majority. Justice Stephen Estcourt dissented, finding that there had occurred a substantial miscarriage of justice.

=== Refusal of special leave to appeal ===
On 12 August 2022, the High Court of Australia refused Neill-Fraser's application for special leave to appeal the decision of the Court of Criminal Appeal dismissing the second appeal.

== Political concerns ==
Andrew Wilkie, independent federal member for Denison (now Clark) has been critical of the process leading to the conviction of Neill-Fraser since at least 2013. In a statement issued 11 December that year, Wilkie said: "I've been following this matter for some time and remain concerned that Ms Neill-Fraser was convicted in the absence of a body, weapon and motive. I am not presuming Ms Neill-Fraser’s guilt or innocence, however any conviction built on circumstantial evidence must be beyond reasonable doubt and in this case there are simply too many doubts remaining. ... The Tasmanian Government continues to refuse to revisit the matter despite a number of leading legal and civil liberties figures voicing their concern. I feel strongly that a Commission of Inquiry should look afresh at the proceedings which led to her conviction."

Former Tasmanian Premier Lara Giddings is also a prominent supporter of calls to reassess Neill-Fraser case, as reported by the ABC. As also stated in the same source, on 30 August 2021 Mike Gaffney MLC for Mersey tabled a series of documents in Parliament that he said illustrated Neill-Fraser was denied justice because of an inadequate police investigation and false evidence put before the jury:

"We have all had the benefit of a full expose, the results of years of RTI requests, the seeking of expert advice and detailed forensic analysis… Mr President, our courts have been misled, a woman has been incarcerated for 12 years as a consequence." These documents, subsequently referred to as the "Etter/Selby Papers Tabled 31 August 2021" since they were prepared by Barbara Etter APM, former senior police officer, inaugural CEO of the Integrity Commission in Tasmania and previously, lawyer for Neill-Fraser, together with barrister Hugh Selby, have been made available online. A follow-up document prepared by Etter and Selby in 2025 has also been tabled in the Tasmanian Parliament.

Senator Jacqui Lambie also spoke in August 2025 in the Tasmanian Senate about the prosecution of the Neill-Fraser case being "botched" when arguing for a "thorough, independent inquiry" into the culture and procedures of Tasmania Police, citing lack of information presented (to the latest Appeal Court) "about both the true state of the scientific research and the evidence, and the factual unlikelihood of Ms Vass and her associates, being at that slip yard".

== Parole ==
On 16 September 2022, it was announced that the Parole Board of Tasmania had granted Neill-Fraser parole. Neill-Fraser was released on the morning of 4 October 2022. Among the terms of her release, she was required to comply with a requirement for electronic monitoring and "To not contact [a] named person directly or indirectly". In December 2024, the Tasmanian Parole Board added a new parole condition which prohibited her from "communicating directly or indirectly with any media outlet to claim [her] alleged innocence and/or wrongful conviction"; in May 2025, this condition was replaced with a condition prohibiting her from "communicating directly or indirectly – including through third parties, written statements, electronic communications, social media platforms, television, radio, podcasts, streaming services, online video-sharing platforms, or any other public or broadcast media – to assert claims regarding your alleged innocence, wrongful conviction, or dispute the legitimacy of your conviction or sentencing". In August 2025, this revised condition was challenged by the Human Rights Law Centre in the Supreme Court of Tasmania on the grounds that it was "unreasonable, improper and in breach of the constitutionally implied freedom of political communication".

In September 2026, the parole condition was determined to rely on hallucinated case law generated by artificial intelligence.

== In the media ==
In 2013, psychologist and film producer Eve Ash produced a documentary called Shadow of Doubt about the conviction of Neill-Fraser, which was later nominated for best feature documentary at the AACTA Awards.

The murder is also the subject of a 21-episode investigative true crime podcast called Who Killed Bob?. The podcast was hosted by Ash and former homicide task force detective Colin McLaren.

60 Minutes and A Current Affair also aired several reports covering the case, including an interview with Vass. In general terms, all of these espouse the "miscarriage of justice" viewpoint to the effect that Neill-Fraser was wrongly convicted, and that Chappell's death was instead due to some kind of "break-in gone wrong", a conclusion that is at odds with that of the legal system (through a number of iterations) and the 2014 report of the Coroner. (Note: The phrase "break-in gone wrong" is used in the 2020 60 Minutes feature "Justice Overboard" and there attributed to "Susan Neil-Fraser's supporters". According to this theory, there had been previous break-ins to boats moored in the area while unattended, in order to steal items of value for re-sale; if Chappell had been on board the boat while such a break-in occurred, he may have been killed in a resulting altercation. This theory was mentioned in the 2012 Appeal documents: "In his closing address [in the original trial], counsel for the appellant argued that DNA evidence established that Ms Vass had been on the yacht by the time of the disappearance of the deceased, for her own evidence established that she was not on the yacht after that time, at either Constitution Dock or Goodwood. He raised that it was a reasonable conclusion that she was on the yacht "for no good" and more likely with some other person or persons"; for additional context, refer the sections of the present article (above) dealing with the Second Appeal. Yet another hypothesis, separately advanced by Neill-Fraser in various statements, was that this was the latest in a series of break-ins to the vessel possibly by persons using the vessel to conceal and later retrieve drugs, a suggestion that appeared to be unsupported by any verifiable facts.)

== See also ==
- List of people who disappeared mysteriously at sea
