= Colin McLaren =

Australian documentary film maker, crime writer, and former police detective sergeant

Colin McLaren is an Australian documentary filmmaker, crime writer, and former police detective sergeant. His 2013 book JFK: The Smoking Gun, based on his theory about the assassination of U.S. president John F. Kennedy, was made into an award-winning documentary film. A feature-length telemovie Underbelly Files: Infiltration about his life, starring Sullivan Stapleton in the title role, aired in 2011.

== Police career ==
McLaren joined Victoria Police at the age of 24 and worked in law enforcement during the 1980s and 1990s. When asked to join a covert surveillance unit, he began spying on drug importers and the ringleaders of organised crime, before going undercover and organising a covert sting operation.

As a member of Australian task forces, McLaren worked as a suit-and-tie detective. He contributed on the Walsh Street murders of police constables Steven Tynan and Damian Eyre, the Mr Cruel child rapes, the murder of thirteen-year-old Karmein Chan, and the bombing of the National Crime Authority offices in Adelaide, where he was task force leader. McLaren then went undercover, where for two years he infiltrated Australia's mafia in the guise of a money-laundering art dealer. Eleven Mafia bosses received sentences of up to 13 years each for major drug trafficking and racketeering. He also went undercover for another year to gain evidence on the mafia responsible for the NCA bombing.

== Writing career ==
McLaren began writing in 2005, commencing on his first book, which became a best seller. McLaren's first book, Infiltration, is a non-fiction book detailing his efforts as a suit and tie detective and undercover agent who infiltrated the Mafia. McLaren followed this up with On the Run, a non-fiction book about McLaren as his Mafia alias, Cole Goodwin, which was adapted to a screenplay. McLaren's third book, Sunflower, is a historical work depicting the experiences of his grandfather, one of Australia's longest-serving foot soldiers in the First World War.

McLaren's book JFK: The Smoking Gun was based upon Howard Donahue's theory that United States president John F. Kennedy was accidentally shot by a secret service agent in the car behind Kennedy's limousine. McLaren's investigation was a continuation of Bonar Menninger's earlier book about Donahue's theory, Mortal Error: The Shot That Killed JFK.

From 2016 to 2018, McLaren researched the case of the murder of Bob Chappell in Hobart, Tasmania, where Susan Neill-Fraser was convicted of killing her de facto husband on their yacht. For two years, McLaren spoke to hundreds of people, witnesses and police and produced a book called Southern Justice, published in 2019. It details an alternative view of the murder and shows that other persons may have been involved and that Neill-Fraser may be innocent. He was called to give evidence at the Supreme Court in early 2019.

== TV series and episodes ==
McLaren's police career has been the focus of various television documentaries and the Underbelly Files: Infiltration telemovie series screened on Channel 9.

McLaren is a technical advisor for many TV series and films in the crime genre, among them the Screentime Films trilogy of Tell them Lucifer was Here, The Man that Got Away and Infiltration. Also the TV series Squizzy about Squizzy Taylor, a gangster from the 1920s, for which McLaren wrote storyline material. McLaren also contributed to Killing Time, the television mini-series based on once corrupt lawyer Andrew Fraser's life, produced by Fremantle Media, TV1 and Film Victoria. McLaren has narrated episodes on Crimes That Shocked Australia and many other one-hour TV episodes about crime families, gangs and his knowledge of them.

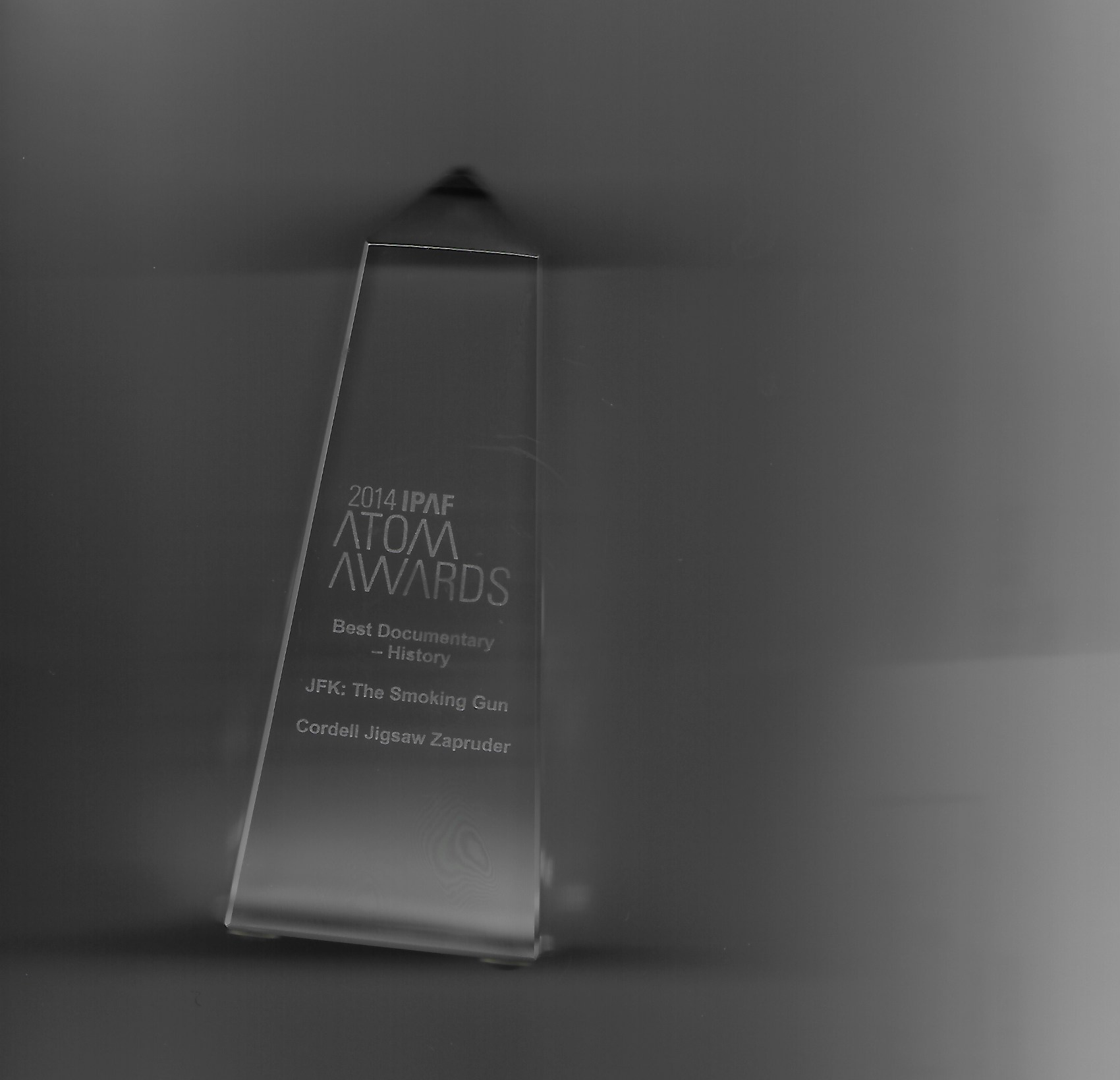
2014 ATOM Award for Best Documentary – History, for JFK: The Smoking Gun

He was also a key expert on a US television show on assassinations called Inside the Evidence which was headed by American anchorman Bill Kurtis. It aired on the Reelz TV channel in the U.S. This was followed by a 90-minute documentary of his findings in JFK:The Smoking Gun. The documentary aired on Australian and American television, Directed by Malcolm McDonald, it features re-enactments, archival footage, and also new interviews with witnesses to the shooting. JFK: The Smoking Gun won a 2014 IPAF ATOM Award for Best Documentary – History. A one-hour abridged version of this documentary aired in the United Kingdom, entitled JFK's Secret Killer: The Evidence. In the television special, McLaren argues that the truth was covered-up to hide impropriety on the part of Secret Service agents.

Throughout 2016, McLaren, in conjunction with Bedlam Productions of London, produced the 2-hour documentary Princess Diana's Death - Mystery Solved. The documentary aired globally on 10 July 2016. The documentary relies on forensic evidence gathered by McLaren when he visited the original crime scene in Paris on 31 August 1997. McLaren's documentary indicated that both the French and English investigations into the death of Diana were flawed. McLaren interviewed many of those involved in the investigation, French police and paparazzi included, as well as crucial witnesses, and concluded that a cover-up existed.

Through 2018 Colin McLaren - with English film director Tim Conrad - created a six-part TV series, Mafia Killers with Colin McLaren, for Reelz TV. Each episode examines a notorious mobster who murdered his way to the top, to take control of a New York City Mafia family, before they themselves met death or lengthy jail terms.

McLaren followed this series by appearing in a six-part TV series Undercurrent, on Australia's Channel Seven network, aired in 2019. His role was as on-screen narrator and crime expert as the TV series followed him - identifying blunders by police in a murder investigation. During the series, McLaren was adamant that the Tasmanian police wrongly charged the victim's wife - Sue Neill-Fraser, concluding that the murder was the work of a gang of violent thieves stealing from yachts, who broke into the Four Winds yacht, only to disturb the owner who was sleeping. A violent fight occurred and the owner was murdered. McLaren secured admissions from one of the gang members as well as highlighting overwhelming forensic evidence and discovered many new witnesses who were previously ignored. As a result, McLaren was called to give evidence at the Supreme Court. Subsequently, the judge allowed Sue Neill-Fraser to appeal her conviction. Since then, Sue Neill-Fraser has lodged a further appeal to the high court of Australia, expected to be heard later in 2022.

Through 2019–20, McLaren was in New York City working on a recurring podcast series with Endeavor Audio and The New York Post on famous deaths that have attracted global fascination. He also worked with executive producer Eve Ash to help create the 12-part podcast series Who Killed Bob? For Podshape.

In between his TV and podcast work, McLaren continued writing his Italian Mafia book. He was given full access to the historical records on the mafia, housed in eleven of the state archives in Italy. The book, Mafioso took almost four years to write. it was published by Hachette Australia in February 2022. The book was shortlisted to the final 4, out of 174 nominees, for the 2022 prestigious Nib Literary Awards in Sydney.

Throughout 2020-2022 McLaren was a key witness in a Supreme Court trial against the mafia boss Domenic Perre for bombing the National Crime Authority office in Australia. Evidence was heard that Perre had a hatred for police and killed and maimed those he resented. His parcel bomb was made of red phosphorus and destroyed the office. The trial took years to eventuate after McLaren pulled together a team of undercover police to infiltrate Perre's organisation and gained part of the evidence used in the trial. Justice Nicholson found Perre guilty on 30 June 2022. Perre had migrated from Calabria, and was, at the time of the bombing, one of the most dangerous mafia bosses in Australia. In early 2023 Perre appealed his conviction, after receiving a 37-year sentence. However on 8 May he died in prison from a suspected heart attack, thereby ending the appeal.

== Publications ==
- (2009) Infiltration, Victory Books ISBN 978-0-522-85679-8
- (2010) On the Run, Victory Books ISBN 978-0-522-85703-0
- (2010) Sunflower, Victory Books ISBN 978-0-522-85762-7
- (2013) JFK: The Smoking Gun ISBN 978-0-733-63641-7
- (2019) Southern Justice ISBN 978-0-733-64175-6
- (2022) Mafioso ISBN 978-0-733-648-106

== See also ==
- Mortal Error, original book with a similar theory to JFK: The Smoking Gun
