= Unforgiving Destiny =

2017 autobiographical work by David McMillan

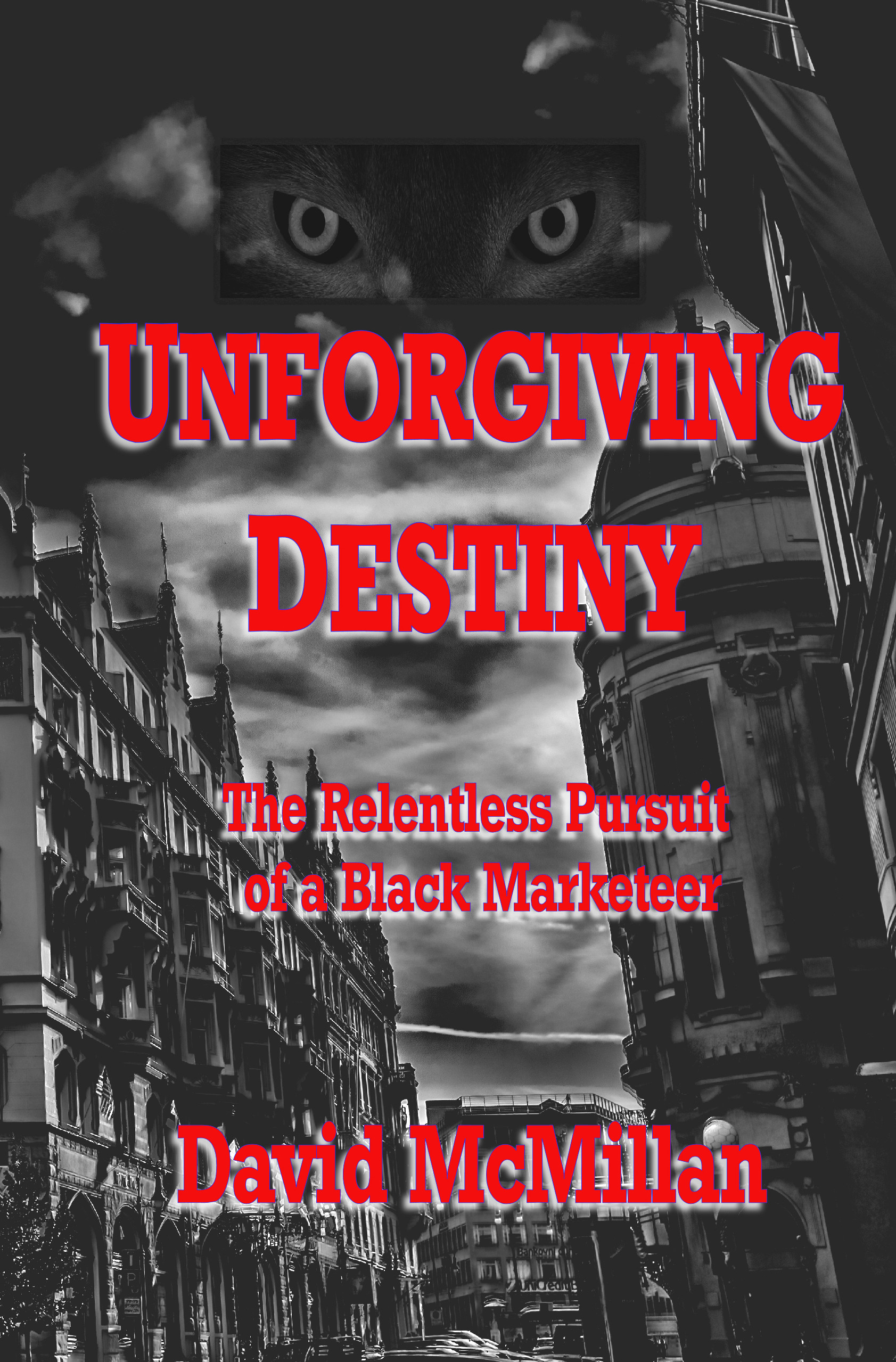
- First Edition, April 2017
- Author: David McMillan
- Illustrator: David McMillan
- Language: English
- Genre: Non-Fiction
- Publisher: ANCWWW
- Publication date: April 2017
- Publication place: United Kingdom
- Media type: Print (paperback) & eBook
- Pages: 422 pp
- ISBN: 978-1-5442-5305-3

Unforgiving Destiny – The Relentless Pursuit of a Black Marketeer is the 2017 autobiographical account of the 37-year pursuit by authorities in twelve countries to imprison the author, David McMillan. Published simultaneously in the United Kingdom, Europe and the United States on the Amazon platform Createspace.

== Synopsis ==
The biography recounts the smuggling career of David McMillan, beginning in India in the 1970s. After early smuggling operations in Thailand and mafia links in New York City, McMillan comes to the attention of the US Drug Enforcement Administration (DEA), where a career officer becomes obsessed with pursuing the independent smuggler. The officer becomes influential in McMillan's arrest in Australia, and a decade later in Bangkok. Following McMillan's escape from a Thai prison, he is in Balochistan (Pakistan) and Afghanistan, where he is attempting to free a kidnapped friend. In Karachi, McMillan is arrested and tortured, and again faces a possible death penalty. However, he arranges his release and travels to Europe where he resumes smuggling. After twenty years as a fugitive, McMillan is arrested in London where the Thai government attempts to have him extradited to face the 23-year-old drug charge. The extradition case fails and McMillan is freed.

== Author’s intent ==
McMillan's hope in publishing the autobiography was to “elevate the standard of true-crime writing, to account for the effects upon the women in my life and to throw some light on the little-understood world of the tribal zones along the Afghan border, where so many terrorist groups were formed. Also, to examine a life shattered and rebuilt five times.”

== Music influences ==
- McMillan has listed music recordings that, he says, were influential during the 40-year span of the book.
