= Philip Dunn (lawyer) =

Australian barrister

Phillip Dunn KC
- Education: University of Melbourne
- Occupation: Barrister
- Known for: Criminal Law

Philip K Dunn KC is an Australian barrister known for his extensive experience in criminal law. He holds an LLB from the University of Melbourne and has been practising law for over five decades. Philip Dunn was admitted to practice law on 1 March 1968 and signed the Bar Roll on 13 February 1969. Early in his career, he read law with the distinguished barrister, jurist and Governor of Victoria, James Gobbo. He was appointed as Queen's Counsel (QC) on 5 December 1995, a title now known as King's Counsel (KC).

== Notable cases ==
Lowery and King Case: The Lowery and King case in 1971 was a notorious murder trial in Warrnambool, Victoria, where Philip Dunn and Phil Cummins served as junior barristers. The case involved the brutal murder of a young girl named Rosalyn Nolte. Due to the horrifying nature of the crime, the defense team faced significant hostility from the local community, including having to stay 30 miles (48 km) away from Warrnambool because no local accommodation would accept them. Despite the challenging environment, the trial progressed with Dunn and Cummins working diligently under senior barrister Harry Ogden, who played a pivotal role in guiding them through the case.

Margaret Frances Glasheen Case: The Margaret Frances Glasheen case was one of Philip Dunn's early criminal trials in the 1970s. Glasheen, a prostitute, was accused of luring a punter into a situation where her minder would rob him. The defence centred around identity, but during the trial, Dunn's cross-examination inadvertently confirmed her presence at the scene. The defence shifted to duress, arguing Glasheen was coerced. Despite the challenges, Dunn successfully achieved an acquittal for Glasheen.

Grollo, Flanagan, and Howard Conspiracy Case: The Grollo, Flanagan, and Howard conspiracy case in 1997 was a significant legal battle involving high-profile defendant Bruno Grollo, and Robert Charles Howard and Major John Flanagan. Philip Dunn represented Major John Flanagan, an ex-Commando known for his dramatic and unconventional behaviour, such as bivouacking on top of the County Court building during the trial. The trial was notable for its complexity and duration, ultimately resulting in the acquittal of all three defendants on conspiracy charges.

The Great Bookie Robbery: In the 1970s, Dunn defended Norman Lee in the infamous Great Bookie Robbery case, where a gang of thieves stole between $14 and $16 million from bookmakers in Melbourne. This heist became one of Australia's most notorious crimes due to its scale and the audacity of the operation. Dunn's defence efforts led to Lee's acquittal in the trial. However, Lee's life came to a tragic end when he was later killed during an attempted robbery of a payroll truck by the Special Operations Group.

The Lockwood and Avon Trial: In 1994, Dunn, alongside Robert Richter KC, defended Detectives Steven Lockwood and Peter Henry Avon in a high-profile trial related to the Walsh Street police murders. The case revolved around the controversial killing of two police officers, Constables Steven Tynan and Damian Eyre, in 1988. Lockwood and Avon were accused of murdering Gary Abdallah in retribution for the officers' deaths. The trial was intensely scrutinized due to its implications on police conduct and justice in Australia. Dunn successfully achieved acquittals for both Lockwood and Avon.

Gary Ablett Senior - Drug Offences: In 2002, Dunn defended AFL legend Gary Ablett Senior, who faced drug charges following the overdose death of Alisha Horan. The case attracted significant media attention due to Ablett's high profile and the tragic circumstances surrounding Horan's death. Ablett admitted to using heroin and ecstasy with Horan on the night she died. Despite the gravity of the situation, Dunn secured a relatively lenient outcome for Ablett, who was fined $1500.

Warren Anderson - Animal Cruelty Case: In 2004, Dunn represented Warren Anderson, a wealthy businessman, in a high-profile animal cruelty case. Anderson faced accusations of starving his hippopotamus at his Northern Territory property, Tipperary Station. The case drew significant media attention due to Anderson's prominence and the unusual nature of the allegations. Dunn's defence navigated the complexities of animal welfare laws and aimed to mitigate the damage to Anderson's reputation.

Melbourne Gangland Wars: In 2007, Philip Dunn defended Carl Williams, a notorious figure in Melbourne's gangland wars, which had gripped the city with a series of violent confrontations and high-profile murders. Williams faced multiple charges, including several murders and conspiracy to murder, and was ultimately sentenced to life imprisonment.

Mick Hawi - Sydney Airport Killing: In 2009, Dunn represented Mick Hawi, the former Comanchero bikie boss, in a high-profile case following a violent brawl at Sydney Airport. The incident, which resulted in the death of a rival gang member, led to significant media coverage and legal scrutiny. Hawi was initially convicted of murder, but his conviction was later overturned on appeal.

Sekonaia Vave - Drive-by Shooting: In 2017, Dunn successfully defended Sekonaia Vave, who was acquitted of murder and attempted murder charges stemming from a drive-by shooting incident. The case involved the shooting death of Ikenasio Tuivasa and the injury of another individual, Reza Amir, outside a Melbourne pool hall. Dunn's defence was instrumental in demonstrating that the police had relied excessively on Amir's testimony while disregarding independent evidence, leading to Vave's acquittal.

Erin Patterson - Leongatha Mushroom Murders: In 2023, Dunn initially represented Erin Patterson, who faced multiple charges of murder and attempted murder in connection with a mushroom poisoning case in Leongatha, Victoria. The case involved the deaths of her former parents-in-law and her estranged husband’s aunt, along with the attempted poisoning of two other individuals. The legal proceedings were notable for their complexity and the severe nature of the allegations. However, her legal representation later changed to barrister Colin Mandy SC, with Dunn no longer involved in the case as it progressed.

The Easton Affair: Dunn defended Carmen Lawrence during her perjury trial related to the Easton Affair. Lawrence, a former Premier of Western Australia, was accused of giving false testimony regarding her knowledge of a controversial petition linked to the death of Penny Easton. The petition, alleging misconduct by Easton’s estranged husband, led to significant political fallout. Dunn's defense was successful, and Lawrence was acquitted of all charges, clearing her of any wrongdoing in the case.

== Foley's List interview (2016) ==
In 2016, Phillip Dunn participated in an extensive interview with Juliette Brodsky for Foley's List oral history project. His insights and experiences shared during the interview provided a comprehensive record of his perspectives on criminal law and the evolution of the legal profession.

On Restorative Justice:

"I’ve become an advocate for the restorative justice scheme; I think it’s a great idea. If you think about the way we deal in our criminal courts with problems in the adversary system with the Judeo-Christian moral ethic, coupled with this Dickensian system of jails where we punish, we’ll look back in a hundred years’ time and say, 'We could have done better.'"

On The Prominence of the Victorian Criminal Bar:

"The Victorian criminal bar has been a very strong force for cohesion at the Victorian Bar, pro bono work, and raising standards. I think the Victorian criminal bar’s the best criminal bar in Australia."

On The Impact of Trials On Victims Of Sex Crimes:

"I think it traumatises the victims; it doesn’t help convince them it’s not their fault. If you go through a process of being cross-examined, I think there’s post-traumatic stress laid on top of the victims."

In the interview, Dunn also discussed his longstanding friendship with fellow Melbourne Barrister, Robert Richter KC:

"When I separated from my [first] wife, I had nowhere to go and I finished up living in Robert Richter’s house for months. Then I got embarrassed and he bought a house two doors down and said [I] could live in it. That was very generous. I wrote out an amount every month for the rent and at the end of twelve months, my accountant said he had these twelve cheques from Robert Richter that hadn’t been cashed. I went to Robert and said 'What are you doing to me?' Robert said he didn’t know how I was travelling and he hadn’t wanted to embarrass me, so he hadn’t cashed them. He’s a very decent human being."

== Rational Alternative Theory (RAT) ==
Phillip Dunn KC has discussed his use of a method for establishing reasonable doubt called "Rational Alternative Theory (RAT)" in published interviews. Notably, he elaborated on this approach during an interview with Foley's List, where he explained how RAT is employed to create reasonable doubt by presenting one or more alternative explanations for the prosecution's evidence.

In the Foley's List interview, Dunn stated:

"The Crown says the only possible explanation for this set of facts is guilt. If you have a rival or rational alternative theory, then the Crown can’t prove its case beyond reasonable doubt. So what I tell my juniors is that you always look for the RAT – it’s not just a matter of attacking the Crown witnesses, it’s that rival theory that explains the facts."

== Professional appointments ==
- Chairman of Foley's List of Barristers
- Member of the Victorian Bar Council
- Chairman of the Addiction Research Institute
- Member of the Lord Mayor's Drug Advisory Committee
- Committee member of the Criminal Bar Association of Victoria
- Committee member of the Victorian Bar Arts and Collections Committee
- Victorian Practising Counsel: Division of Bar Roll
- Victorian New Barristers Committee: Committee member

== Portrait unveiling ==
A portrait of Philip Dunn KC and Robert Richter KC, painted by artist Ralph Heimans, was unveiled in 2023 and is displayed at the Victorian Bar in Melbourne, in tribute to their combined contributions to the legal profession.
