= Eve Ash =

Australian psychologist and filmmaker

- Born: Melbourne
- Occupations: Psychologist, motivational speaker, filmmaker, author and entrepreneur

Eve Ash is an Australian psychologist, motivational speaker, filmmaker, author and entrepreneur. Eve is the CEO and founder of Seven Dimensions and co-created the Cutting Edge Communication Comedy series starring Erin Brown and Emmy Award winning Kim Estes. Eve's books Rewrite Your Life! and Rewrite Your Relationships! were co-written with Rob Gerrand and published by Penguin Books. Her documentary Shadow of Doubt about the murder of Bob Chappell and conviction of Susan Neill-Fraser was nominated for best feature documentary at the AACTA Awards.She produced and stars in a 6 part TV series: Undercurrent: True Murder Investigation. Her latest film, Man on the Bus, won the audience award at the Jewish International Film festival 2019. Eve was a Director/ Board Member of the Australian Film Institute and Film Victoria (formerly the Victorian Film Corporation).

== Early life, family and education ==
Eve Ash was born in 1951 to Polish Jewish Holocaust survivors Feliks and Martha Ash who had emigrated to Melbourne Australia, two years previously with Eve's older sister, Helen, settling in Murrumbeena. Feliks was in the Janowska concentration camp where he and fellow inmate Leon Wells broke out on 19 November 1943. In Melbourne, he established a successful sports clothing business (Feliks Ash Industries), while Martha's artistic interests and talent for languages provided a stimulating home environment for her two girls.

Eve attended Kilvington Grammar School, followed by Shelford Girls' Grammar and Mac Robertson Girls High between 1965 and 1968. After graduating with a BSc (Hons.) degree in psychology from Monash University and a BEd (Counselling) degree from La Trobe University, Eve worked for the Federal Government as a psychologist and trainer.

Eve subsequently founded her business Seven Dimensions in 1979, with the mission of self-financing and producing comedy business films. She has two children.

In 2008, many years after her parents died, Eve uncovered a family secret that compelled her to "rewrite" her own life. After the results of DNA testing, Eve discovered that she was in fact the love-child of a long-standing clandestine affair. Her biological father was alive and well, working full-time as Australia's oldest land surveyor. The story forms the basis of Eve's award-winning documentary Man on the Bus – released in 2019.

Eve has two children and two grandchildren. Her sister Helen Schamroth lives in New Zealand.

== Personal awards ==
- Australian Businesswomen's Hall of Fame – Australian Business Women's Network (2000)
- National Winner – 1999 Telstra Business Women's Awards, Westpac Business Owner Awards
- Victorian Winner – 1999 Telstra Businesswoman of the Year Awards (Bank of Melbourne Business Owner)
- Victorian Winner – American Chamber of Commerce Market Place Forum Public Speaking (1997)
- ADESIC Award for Outstanding Contribution to the Australian Education & Training Industry (1989)

== Seven Dimensions (7D) ==
In 1979, Ash founded Seven Dimensions (7D). In 1988, she co-founded Quarry Productions with fellow psychologist Peter Quarry.

Seven Dimensions has produced hundreds of videos including the Switch On Series for culture change and the children's animated series Finding My Magic with Cathy Freeman.

In 2012, with US comedienne Erin Brown, Ash devised and produced the Cutting Edge Communication Comedy Series, the Cutting Edge English Series and the Cutting Edge Success at Work Series. By 2016, she had produced 150 of the Cutting Edge videos.

From 2015 to 2020, Ash has produced 94 Insights & Strategies videos and over 150 microlearning videos.

=== Film awards ===
- 2019 Jewish International Film Festival – Audience Award: Best Documentary Film, Man On The Bus.
- 2019 Indie Fest Film Awards – Award of Excellence: Jewish, Award of Excellence: Documentary Feature, Award of Excellence: Editing, Award of Merit Special Mention: Viewer Impact: Entertainment Value, Award of Merit Special Mention: History / Biographical, Award of Merit Special Mention: On-Camera Talent (Eve Ash), Award of Merit Special Mention: Sound Editing / Sound Mixing, Award of Merit: Original Score (Man on The Bus by Cezary Skubiszewski), Man on the Bus.
- 2019 Accolade Global Film Competition Awards – Award of Excellence: Documentary Feature, Award of Excellence: On-Camera Talent, Award of Excellence: Women Filmmakers, Award of Merit Special Mention: History / Biographical, Award of Merit Special Mention: Original Score (Man on the Bus by Cezary Skubiszewski), Award of Merit Special Mention: Editing, Man On The Bus.
- 2019 Burbank International Film Festival – semi-finalist, Man On The Bus.
- 2019 Colorado International Film Festival – award winner, Man On The Bus.
- 2015 Best Shorts, Winner- Award of Recognition, Boosting Emotional Intelligence – Cutting Edge Communication Comedy Series, USA
- 2015 Accolade Global Film Competition, Winner - Awards of Merit, Boosting Emotional Intelligence – Cutting Edge Communication Comedy Series, USA
- 2011 Columbus International Film Festival, Certificate of Honorable Mention, Herpes: The Secret is Out, USA
- 2010 Nevada Film Festival, Silver Screen Award Winner, Finding My Magic, USA
- 2010 GIAA Festival ofShort Films & Videos, NY, Best Animation, Finding My Magic, USA
- 2010 Chris Awards, Columbus International Film Festival, Bronze Plaque, Finding My Magic, USA
- 2010 Questar Awards, Silver Award, Finding My Magic, USA
- 2003 US International Film & Video Festival, Gold Camera Award, Boomerang, USA

== Documentaries ==
Ash's latest documentary is the award-winning Man on The Bus, 2019, about her own family investigation into her parents’ holocaust experiences and her mother's secret that changes everything. Premiering in Australia at the Jewish International Film festival, and in Connecticut USA at the New Haven International Film festival and the Colorado Film Festival. It has won 15 awards including Award of Excellence: Documentary Feature at Accolade Global Film Competition Awards and Award of Excellence: Jewish at Indie Fest Film Awards.

Ash directed and produced an acclaimed documentary Shadow of Doubt, about the conviction of Tasmanian grandmother Susan Neill-Fraser for the murder of Bob Chappell. It won a CINE Golden Eagle award and was also nominated for Best Feature Documentary at the 2014 AACTA Awards. Eve's efforts to overturn Sue Neill-Fraser's conviction have generated considerable media publicity. Eve has continued to work on this case with former detective Colin McLaren through to 2018, and teaming up with cinematographer Tim Smart, and production company CJZ she has produced the TV series Undercurrent for the Seven Network.

== Books and writing ==
Ash and Rob Gerrand co-wrote Rewrite Your Life! and Rewrite Your Relationships! Published by Penguin Books. Ash is lead writer on people problems for business publication SmartCompany where over 500 of her blogs have been published since 2007.
