= Underbelly Files: Chopper =

- Genre: Crime drama
- Written by: Justin Monjo
- Directed by: Peter Andrikidis
- Starring: Aaron Jeffery; Michael Caton; Todd Lasance; Ella Scott Lynch; Zoe Ventoura; Vince Colosimo; Kevin Harrington; Debra Byrne; Jane Allsop; Reef Ireland; Alex Tsitsopoulos; Anna Bamford; Marny Kennedy; Jacqui Williams; Mark Fitzgerald
- Country of origin: Australia
- Original language: English

Production
- Executive producer: Rory Callaghan
- Producers: Kerrie Mainwaring; Karl Zwicky
- Production company: Screentime

Original release
- Network: Nine Network
- Release: 11 February – 12 February 2018

Related
- Underbelly Files: The Man Who Got Away

Underbelly Files: Chopper is an Australian 2-part mini-series that screened on the Nine Network, premiering on 11 February 2018 and concluding the next day. It is part of the Underbelly franchise and continues the Underbelly Files spin-off tele-movies. It was preceded by Tell Them Lucifer was Here, Infiltration, and The Man Who Got Away.

Underbelly Files: Chopper recounts the true story of Australian criminal and author Mark "Chopper" Read, a notorious Melbourne standover man.

== Production ==
In November 2016, it was announced that Underbelly would return in 2017 with a new season focusing on Chopper Read. In May 2017, Aaron Jeffery was announced as the role of Chopper Read, and also Michael Caton to play Chopper's father, Keith. Production for the series will be filmed in Melbourne in July 2017.

In August 2017, more cast members were announced with Todd Lasance as Syd Collins, Ella Scott Lynch as Chopper's second wife Margaret, Zoe Ventoura as Chopper's first wife Mary Ann, and in unconfirmed roles are Jane Allsop, Reef Ireland, Alex Tsitsopoulos and Anna Bamford. Also returning to former Underbelly roles are Vince Colosimo as Alphonse Gangitano and Kevin Harrington as Lewis Moran, plus Debra Byrne as Judy Moran.

Although the series was announced to air in 2017, production for the series began later in 2017 and was pushed and back set to air in 2018.

== Plot ==
=== Part One ===
Chopper tells his story at a show in 2002.

Chopper is walking home when he is abducted by a man with a gun. The man takes Chopper to the bush and forces him to dig his own grave. While he is digging Chopper is laughing and joking with his assailant and asks the man to remove his cuffs to allow to him dig more freely. After the cuffs are removed Chopper attacks the man with a shovel and kills him.

Chopper then robs Alphonse Gangitano's & Lewis Moran's card game with a stick of dynamite to find out who wanted him dead. Alphonse, intimidated by the lit stick of dynamite, names the person responsible for hiring the hit man. Chopper finds the man and takes him to an empty pub to question him about why he wanted him dead. After torturing him with a blowtorch and bolt cutters the man reveals that Syd Collins hired him for the hit. Chopper then confronts Syd, getting into a brawl with him and his fellow bikers, with the police arriving and arresting Chopper, sending him back to jail.

Chopper is released from jail and reconnects with Margaret at a motel. Margaret asks Chopper to go straight and forget about being Chopper. Later he goes out for cigarettes when he is shot at by Alphonse Gangitano, who is still mad about Chopper robbing him years earlier. Chopper and Margaret decide to move to Tasmania with Chopper's father Keith, who wants him to continue his life of crime and retaliate against his enemies. Chopper tells him that he can't do it anymore and that he is too old to stand over people.

Chopper reveals to his father that he has written a book about his life called Chopper: From The Inside. His father is not sure if anyone would read the book and is still insistent that he return to a life of crime, but Chopper tells him that the book would add to his legend and that people would be angry if they were excluded from it. The book is a huge success which pleases Chopper and his father. It does however infuriate Alphonse Gangitano, who is referred to in it as a fairy godfather, and Lewis Moran who is not mentioned in to book at all.

The books success makes Chopper a star. This starts making people inspect the Chopper persona and ask him to commit minor crimes to amuse them. Chopper and his new friend Trent Anthony are at a strip club when Chopper is threatened by Syd Collins. Syd then shows up at Chopper's house and demands that Chopper attend his wedding and give him $8,000 to help pay for expenses, which he refuses. Chopper then attends a biker party with a walking stick saying it is a wedding present for Syd as he is not going to his wedding. He asks Syd to be reasonable but Syd insists Chopper come and help pay for the wedding, at which point Chopper asks him "do you want me to shoot you".

Some time later Syd Collins is shot in the stomach and when he is interviewed by police he claims that Chopper shot him because he didn't want to come to the wedding. When police talk to Chopper he tells them he had nothing to do with Syd being shot and that Trent Anthony can confirm his story.

=== Part Two ===
To prove he is rehabilitated and secure his release, Chopper marries new flame Mary Ann and starts a family — but the only woman who could ever look past 'Chopper' and see the real Mark is his true love, Margaret.

Intercutting between Chopper's comedy routine in 2002 and his past in Tasmania, his fixation on Syd only grows. Ever since the shooting, Syd has haunted Chopper's recollections, but the spectre of Syd is now bleeding into his present, begging the questions: Is this a haunting of resentment? Or is it a sign of a guilty conscience? Did Chopper shoot and later kill Sydney Collins? Or was he framed? The deeper we dig into the embellished retrospects of one of Australia's most notorious standover men, the further away the truth becomes.

== Cast ==
- Aaron Jeffery as Mark "Chopper" Read (Standover man & Author)
- Michael Caton as Keith Read (Chopper's Father)
- Todd Lasance as Syd Collins (Bikie Boss & Chopper's nemesis)
- Ella Scott Lynch as Margaret (Chopper's second wife)
- Zoe Ventoura as Mary Ann Hodge (Chopper's first wife)
- Vince Colosimo as Alphonse Gangitano (member of the Carlton Crew)
- Kevin Harrington as Lewis Moran (member of the Carlton Crew)
- Debra Byrne as Judy Moran (Lewis's Wife)
- Jane Allsop as Detective Martin
- Reef Ireland as Trent Anthony
- Alex Tsitsopoulos as Detective Hendry
- Marny Kennedy as Senior Constable Jassic
- Rhys Mitchell as Senior Constable Smiley
- Nicholas Bell as Detective Damian Bugg
- Krista Vendy as Fanny

== Reception ==
=== Viewership ===
The first part of the mini-series achieved a metro ratings audience of 903,000, coming first in its timeslot in front of Seven Network's coverage of the 2018 Winter Olympics and ranking sixth of the night.

The second part of the mini-series dropped more than 200,000 viewers and achieved a metro ratings audience of 696,000, coming second in its timeslot behind Seven Network's coverage of the 2018 Winter Olympics and ranking 11th of the night.

No.	Title	Air date	Timeslot	Overnight ratings		Consolidated ratings		Total viewers	Ref(s)
No.	Title	Air date	Timeslot	Viewers	Rank	Viewers	Rank	Total viewers	Ref(s)
1	Part 1	11 February 2018	Sunday 8:30pm	903,000	6	163,000	4	1,066,000	
2	Part 2	12 February 2018	Monday 9:00pm	696,000	11	127,000	9	823,000	

== See also ==
- Chopper
- List of Australian television series
- List of programs broadcast by Nine Network
