= Underbelly Files: Tell Them Lucifer was Here =

- Genre: Crime drama
- Written by: Peter Gawler
- Directed by: Shawn Seet
- Starring: Brett Climo; Jeremy Kewley; Todd Lasance; Jane Allsop; Paul O'Brien; Greg Stone; Dimitri Baveas; Annie Jones
- Country of origin: Australia
- Original language: English

Production
- Producers: Peter Gawler; Elisa Argenzio
- Production company: Screentime

Original release
- Network: Nine Network
- Release: 7 February 2011

Related
- Underbelly Files: Infiltration

Underbelly Files: Tell Them Lucifer was Here is an Australian made-for-television movie that aired on 7 February 2011 on the Nine Network. It is part of the Underbelly franchise and is the first of four television movies in the spin-off series Underbelly Files, the other three being Infiltration, The Man Who Got Away, and Chopper.

It tells the true story of the murders of two Victorian police officers, Gary Silk and Rodney Miller, who were gunned down in the line of duty in 1998 and the manhunt to catch their killers.

== Synopsis ==
Tell Them Lucifer was Here tells the true story of the murders of Police Officers Silk and Miller, who were gunned down in the line of duty in 1998, and the massive police manhunt to catch their killers. The story centres on the investigation of the murders under the direction of Detective Inspector Paul Sheridan and the Lorimer Taskforce. Tracking down the killers proved all but impossible, and it was only through outstanding detective work, dogged persistence, and sheer faith that the killers were brought to justice.

=== Alternate version ===
Late in 2010, the telemovie hit a legal snag as part of a pending court case in the New South Wales (NSW) law courts, which resulted in a slightly altered version of Tell Them Lucifer was Here being broadcast in Sydney and NSW on Monday 7 February. The version screened in NSW omitted one particular scene and changed the names of a number of individuals in the case (for example, "Bandali Debs" was changed to "Patrici Fabro"). However, in an oversight, the subtitles were not edited, and showed the original names. When the DVD of the "Underbelly Files" telemovies were released Tell Them Lucifer Was Here was omitted from the release in NSW only. Like the first series of Underbelly in Victoria releases of the DVD that contained Tell Them Lucifer Was Here had a warning sticker banning the exhibition of the telemovie in NSW.

== Cast ==
- Daniel Whyte as Sgt. Gary Silk
- Paul O'Brien as Snr. Cnst. Rodney Miller
- Brett Climo as Det. Insp. Paul Sheridan
- Jane Allsop as Carmel Arthur
- Jeremy Kewley as Det. Sgt. Graeme Collins
- Todd Lasance as Det. Sgt. Dean Thomas
- Ditch Davey as Det. Sgt. Mick Ritchie
- Christopher Bunworth as Det. Sgt. Mark Butterworth
- James Taylor as Det. Sgt. Steve Beanland
- Marshall Napier as Chief Comm. Neil Comrie
- Robert Taylor as Dpty. Comm. Graham Sinclair
- Greg Stone as Bandali Debs
- Dimitri Baveas as Jason Roberts
- Annie Jones as Dorothy Debs
- Brigid Gallacher as Nicole Debs
- Melissa Bergland as Joanne Debs
- Lee Cormie as Joseph Debs
- Don Hany as Nik "The Russian" Radev
- Tim Ross as Snr Constable Darren Sherren
- Robert Ratti as Greaseball
- Jasmine Dare as Kristy Harty
- Saara Lamberg as Sabrina (German backpacker)

== Ratings ==
Tell Them Lucifer was Here aired on 7 February 2011 at 8:30 pm and pulled in an audience of 1.377 million viewers, which made it the #1 rating show for that night. However 1.377 million viewers was somewhat down from previous Underbelly premieres.
