= John H. Davis (author) =

American writer (1929–2012)

- Born: John Hagy Davis; June 14, 1929; Manhattan, New York, U.S.
- Died: January 29, 2012 (aged 82); Manhattan, New York, U.S.
- Education: Princeton University (1951); Columbia University
- Occupation: Author
- Relatives: Jacqueline Kennedy Onassis (cousin); Lee Radziwill (cousin)
- Writing career
- Subjects: Kennedy family Mafia

John Hagy Davis (June 14, 1929 – January 29, 2012) was an American author who wrote several books on the Bouvier and Kennedy families and on the Mafia, both the Sicilian Mafia and its Italian-American offshoot.

== Biography ==
Davis was the son of stockbroker John Ethelbert Davis and Maude Reppelin Bouvier, younger sister of John Vernou Bouvier III and, therefore, first cousin of Jacqueline Kennedy Onassis and Lee Radziwill. His mother and John V. Bouvier III were both children of prominent New York lawyer John Vernou Bouvier Jr.

Davis was a 1951 graduate of Princeton University as well as Columbia University. While serving in the United States Navy during the 1950s he was an officer with the Sixth Fleet stationed in Naples, Italy. Davis said that he was required to "deal with the Mafia hoods who controlled the ports" as part of his duties as shore patrol and legal officer. He stated that during his time there he became interested in the history of Italy and studied the history of the Mafia. After the Navy, Davis studied at the Italian Institute for Historical Studies in Naples, and directed a cultural center in southern Italy.

== Author ==
Davis is the author of several books about American families such as the Bouviers, the Guggenheims and the Kennedys. In 1988 he was interviewed for the Jack Anderson documentary American Expose: Who Killed JFK?, and also appeared in an episode of The Kwitny Report, discussing the American mafia and Kennedy's assassination. That same year, Davis contributed the introduction to David E. Scheim's book Contract on America: The Mafia Murder of President John F. Kennedy.

Davis' books on the Kennedy and Bouvier families upset members of the Bouvier family of which Davis was a member. In 1984 he published a 900-page book The Kennedys: Dynasty and Disaster, which included coverage of unpleasant aspects of the Kennedy family history. His sister recalled that "after ’84, Jackie made it pretty clear she didn’t want my brother’s company", adding that "she was about family myths, and John tried very hard to write truthfully".

=== Mafia Kingfish ===
In 1989, the New American Library published Mafia Kingfish: Carlos Marcello and the Assassination of John F. Kennedy, in which Davis implicated the Mafia and Carlos Marcello in the assassination of John F. Kennedy. According to Davis, Lee Harvey Oswald and Jack Ruby had "strong ties" to Marcello, and that an Oswald imposter visited the Russian embassies in Cuba and Mexico.

Publishers Weekly called it an "engrossing, startlingly detailed biography of a Mafia don". Kirkus Reviews said "the centerpiece of [Mafia Kingfish] is a plausible, even persuasive, case for the proposition that the Gulf Coast godfather masterminded the assassination of JFK." A reviewer for The Pittsburgh Press wrote: "'Mafia Kingfish' is such a page-turner, it could be a fictional thriller. But it's an amazing bit of contemporary history begging for someone to solve its mystery."

=== Mafia Dynasty ===
HarperCollins published Davis's 1993 book Mafia Dynasty: The Rise and Fall of the Gambino Crime Family. According to Publishers Weekly, the book "explores the history of the Cosa Nostra from its roots in Italy and brilliantly depicts the violent, vicious, vulgar brotherhood." Kirkus wrote that the book was "[a]n authoritative overview of the nation's premier criminal organization, and of the greed and hubris that have toppled its leaders time and again."

== Later life and death ==
Davis died at his home in Manhattan on 29 January 2012, aged 82, due to complications of Alzheimer's disease. He was buried in Woodlawn Cemetery in The Bronx.

== Published works ==
- (1969) The Bouviers: Portrait of an American Family.
- (1978) The Guggenheims: An American Epic.
- (1984) The Kennedys: Dynasty and Disaster.
- (1989) Mafia Kingfish: Carlos Marcello and the Assassination of John F. Kennedy.
- (1993) Kennedy Contract: The Mafia Plot to Assassinate the President.
- (1993) The Bouviers: From Waterloo to the Kennedys and Beyond.

Expanded 2nd edition of the 1969 book.

- (1994) Mafia Dynasty: The Rise and Fall of the Gambino Family.
- (1998) Jacqueline Bouvier: An Intimate Memoir.

=== Introductions ===
- Introduction to Scheim, David E. (1988). Contract on America: The Mafia Murder of President John F. Kennedy. Shapolsky Publishers. ISBN 978-0933503304.
- Introduction to Crenshaw, Charles A. (1992). JFK: Conspiracy of Silence. Signet. ISBN 978-0451403469.
