= Tim Ellis (lawyer) =

Tasmanian barrister (born 1955)

Timothy James Ellis SC

Director of Public Prosecutions for the State of Tasmania
- In office 25 August 1999 – 15 January 2015
- Preceded by: Damian Bugg QC
- Succeeded by: Daryl Coates SC

Personal details
- Born: 1955 (age 70–71) Tasmania
- Spouse: Anita Smith
- Children: 2
- Education: University of Tasmania
- Occupation: Barrister

Timothy James Ellis SC is a Tasmanian barrister and former Tasmanian Director of Public Prosecutions.

== Background ==
Ellis was born in 1955 and raised in Longford, Tasmania. He graduated LLB from the University of Tasmania in 1977. He was admitted as a barrister and solicitor of the Supreme Court of Tasmania in 1979, and practised from the Launceston firm of Clarke & Gee.

He was appointed Director of Public Prosecutions in 1999, and was dismissed in 2015 following his conviction for negligent driving causing the death of Natalia Pearn in 2013.

== Notable cases ==
In 2007, Ellis charged then Labor Minister for Infrastructure, Bryan Green, with conspiracy and interfering with an executive officer. The charges related to an alleged deal between Green and the Tasmanian Compliance Corporation, a privately owned building accreditation company with two former Labor ministers on its board, which saw a monopoly granted to the Corporation for builder accreditation worth up to $2,600,000. Green was tried twice, on each occasion with a hung jury as a result. He was discharged by the Supreme Court.

In 2008, Ellis controversially decided to charge Jack Johnston, Commissioner of Tasmania Police with divulging State Secrets, igniting a political stoush with Premier David Bartlett. After Johnston successfully applied to stay the prosecution permanently, Ellis sought to appeal against the permanent stay but because of a legislative absence was not able to appeal to the Court of Criminal Appeal and had to seek special leave to appeal directly from the High Court. Special leave was refused.

Ellis was later criticised by Duncan Kerr, Member of the House of Representatives, in Federal Parliament for both the prosecution of Bryan Green and Jack Johnston. Kerr said:

''In each instance the DPP has pursued prosecutions against high-profile office holders for crimes not involving any element of dishonesty, corruption or intrinsic criminality and so it was entirely predictable, in my opinion, that the harms unleashed and the disruption to our community, would exceed any good that a successful prosecution might achieve...Unlike in Tasmania, Mr Ellis' Commonwealth counterpart has no role in general civil litigation. These balances in the Commonwealth law are sound and Mr Ellis is not subject to them and he has the responsibility for his own self restraint.

— Duncan Kerr, MHR, Speech in House of Representatives, 28 May 2010

Kerr was soon to retire and timed his attack in order to be beyond the reach of the Privileges Committee for it.

In 2010, Ellis conducted the trial of Susan Neill-Fraser for the murder of Bob Chappell on Australia Day, 2009. The result was that Neill-Fraser was found guilty of murder, and sentenced to 26 years’ imprisonment with a non-parole period of 18 years. Ellis later defended the verdict and sentence before the Court of Criminal Appeal, with the result that the verdict was undisturbed, but the sentence was reduced to 23 years' imprisonment, with a non-parole period of 13 years. Ellis again successfully defended the verdict before the High Court of Australia on a special leave application.

Ellis was the subject of personal litigation against him and his former partners of the firm of Clarke & Gee, by a former client who alleged that one of the partners had given negligent advice in relation to the Launceston Tudor Motor Inn.

== Criminal charge, appeal, and dismissal ==
On 24 March 2013, Ellis was driving south on the Midland Highway in Tasmania around a sweeping bend when his vehicle crossed into a lan of oncoming traffic. Ellis managed to steer his vehicle in the wrong lane for some 30 seconds, over 700 metres. He collided with a vehicle being driven by Natalia Pearn. Ms Pearn died as a result of the crash.

Ellis was charged with negligent driving causing death, and pleaded not guilty. Describing the crash in her evidence, Ellis’ partner, Anita Smith, told the court:

It was like a hole had opened up in the earth and we had fallen through it ... I presumed I was dead. I could see the driver’s face and I was just praying that we wouldn’t collide – but we did...Their car spun into a ditch and there was silence...Tim said, ‘We’re alive and I’ve broken my leg’, so I realised I wasn't dead.

— Anita Smith, Cordwell v Ellis, Evidence in Chief, 25 March 2014

Ellis was found guilty of negligent driving causing death on 26 June 2014. Following an unsuccessful appeal, Ellis returned to the Magistrates Court of Tasmania for sentencing. He was convicted of negligent driving causing death, and sentenced to 4 months’ imprisonment, wholly suspended, and driving disqualification for 24 months.

On 15 January 2015, Premier of Tasmania Will Hodgman and Attorney-General Vanessa Goodwin announced Ellis would not continue in the role of DPP, after the Governor accepted their recommendation he be removed from the position.

Ellis was the subject of criticism from the family of Natalia Pearn:

When he killed her, because of who he was, we thought he would stand up again, go ‘look what I have done to this family’. We were so close to Natalia. We did everything with her. She worked with us, she travelled with us, she had her own home but came and had dinner with us and he’s just destroyed us — he has taken everything away from us. His behaviour has been appalling.

— Kris Pearn, Media Statement, 31 July 2015

== Later practice ==
Following his conviction and dismissal as DPP, Ellis was able to return to practice at the bar, with the Law Society of Tasmania President Matthew Verney responding to questions over whether his conviction indicated that by his character he was not fit to practise law, “He was convicted of negligence, not an intentional act, and Magistrate Webster was really clear in his decision in that regard that Ellis hadn't committed a deliberate act, like overtaking when it's unsafe or anything like that. So it's an act of negligence and by definition that is something that is distinct from a question of character."

Mr Ellis suggested the “structure” of Tasmania’s Court of Criminal Appeal “invites apprehension” from convicted criminals seeking to appeal their sentences.
