= Underbelly Files: The Man Who Got Away =

- Genre: Crime drama
- Written by: Kris Mrksa
- Directed by: Cherie Nowlan
- Starring: Toby Schmitz; Claire van der Boom; Jeremy Sims; Aaron Jeffery
- Country of origin: Australia
- Original language: English

Production
- Producers: Peter Gawler; Elisa Argenzio
- Cinematography: Mark Wareham
- Running time: 88 minutes
- Production company: Screentime

Original release
- Network: Nine Network
- Release: 21 February 2011

Related
- Underbelly Files: Infiltration; Underbelly Files: Chopper

Underbelly Files: The Man Who Got Away is an Australian made-for-television movie that aired on 21 February 2011 on the Nine Network. It is the third of four television movies in the Underbelly Files series, the other three being Tell Them Lucifer was Here, Infiltration, and Chopper. It recounts the true story of British-Australian drug smuggler David McMillan, the only man ever to escape from Bangkok's Klong Prem Central Prison.

== Synopsis ==
The Man Who Got Away tells the true story of British-Australian drug smuggler David McMillan. McMillan came from a privileged background, but chose a life of crime, which put him on Interpol's Top Ten Most Wanted list. The love of his life was also his partner in crime, Clelia Vigano. Together McMillan and Vigano were an unstoppable force, or so they thought.

== Cast ==
- Toby Schmitz as David McMillan
- Claire van der Boom as Clelia Vigano
- Jeremy Sims as Tony Moynihan
- Aaron Jeffery as Geoff Leyland
- Brendan Cowell as Benny O'Connell
- Josh Lawson as Michael Sullivan
- Heather Mitchell as Rose McMillan
- Toby Wallace as David Junior
- Roger Oakley as Customs Officer
- David Tredinnick as Peter Howard
- John Orcsik as Ferdi Vigani
- Ian Meadows as DS Tim Fry
- Kate Mulvany as DC Kate Mariner
- Nicholas Brown as Supahaus Chowdury
- Freya Stafford as AFP Inspector Andrea Pascoe
- Nicholas Eadie as Father John Brosnan
- Aaron Jakubenko as Cop #1
- Jessica Gower as Cop #2
- William Zappa as Jack Jacobs
- Deidre Rubenstein (uncredited)

== Production ==
Underbelly Files: The Man Who Got Away is the third of four television movies in the Underbelly Files series, the other three being Tell Them Lucifer was Here, Infiltration, and Chopper.

Kris Mrksa wrote the screenplay. The film was directed by Cherie Nowlan and produced by Peter Gawler and Elisa Argenzio. Mark Wareham was responsible for cinematography.

== Release and reception ==
The Man Who Got Away aired on 21 February 2011 at 8:30pm and attracted an audience of 1.015 million viewers which ranked it the #9 rating show for that night. However it was down from the previous two Underbelly telemovies and is the lowest figure for a Underbelly telemovie or episode of the shows franchise.
