= Slug gate =

Health scandal in Australia

Slug gate, also written slug-gate, stylised as Slug Gate or SlugGate, is a public health scandal and controversy involving a catering firm I Cook Foods, the Department of Health and Human Services and the Greater Dandenong City Council of Victoria, Australia. In early February 2019, a woman died at the Knox Private Hospital and her post-mortem report showed listeria (a bacterium Listeria monocytogenes) infection. An investigation supposedly linked sandwiches supplied by I Cook Foods as the source. On 22 February, Chief Health Officer Brett Sutton made a public statement on the health alert and issued an order to close down I Cook Foods. As one of the evidences of unhygienic condition at the food factory, health inspector Elizabeth Garlick claimed that she found a slug at the premise. The company owner, Ian Cook blamed Sutton of reckless decision and accused Garlick of planting the slug.

A whistleblower from the Greater Dandenong Council claimed that the health inspection did not find any direct link of the sandwich from I Cook Foods and the death of a woman. In addition, the photograph of the slug was manipulated. The original image had tissue papers on the floor while the publicised one did not. A Victorian parliamentary inquiry was conducted in August 2021 in which the whistleblower Kim Rogerson presented how the slug image was doctored. The Knox Council environmental health officer Ray Christy, who also made the inspection before the closure, also testified that evidences were destroyed by the council and the origin of the listeria infection could never be established. The second inquiry in November 2021 decided that it had no authority to take further action on the slug evidences and sanitation issues, but agreed that evidences were overlooked that led to "considerable confusion".

Ian Cook took up the legal case for reopening and a bid towards the loss and damages of the company at the Supreme Court of Victoria. In the final ruling in November 2023, the court declared the closure order invalid and blamed Sutton for unfairly closing the food company, while denying Cook's claim for compensation. Cook had withdrawn the accusation against the Greater Dandenong City Council before the court hearing, but after the court verdict he initiated a new case against the council for deliberate planting of the slug and "malicious prosecution".

== Background ==
On 4 February 2019, an 86-year-old Jean Painter who was hospitalised at Knox Private Hospital, Wantirna, Melbourne, died. She was initially brought into the hospital due to gastroenteritis on 13 January and was discharged on 23 January. Her condition worsened and was re-admitted on 25 January. She was certified to have died of complications due to listeria (a bacterium Listeria monocytogenes) infection. Upon investigation, the listeria infection was believed to have come from a sandwich, specifically supplied by the catering firm I Cook Foods.

I Cook Foods was established by Ian and Dena Cook in Dandenong in 1985. It supplies pre-packed meals to retirement homes, hospitals, and Meals on Wheels across Victoria. By 2019, it became a thriving business with 41 employees. It always had a good record of hygiene and food safety as mandated by the government of Victoria.

Listeria is a common pathogenic bacterium commonly present in foodstuffs and is generally harmless in most situations. However, food processing (other than pasteurisation) and cold preservation can stimulate an overgrowth of the bacterium. The food-borne infection produces the most fatal symptoms mostly in people above 60 years of age and pregnant women as a result of intervention of the bacterium with the immune system.

== Investigation and outcome ==
City of Greater Dandenong Health Inspector, Ray Christy, made the first investigation at the Knox Private Hospital. According to his report, there was no reason to suppose that the infection came from a particular sandwich provided by a particular food supplier. Another Health Inspector Kim Rogerson conducted food and swab testing from I Cook Foods using laboratory analyses on 1 February 2019. Her report indicated no listeria contamination in the food processing unit. An important oversight of the Department of Health was that there were no laboratory tests on the individual food items and components at the I Cook Foods.

The third investigation was done by Elizabeth Garlick on 18 February 2019 at the food factory. She announced that in one of the corners, she found a slug which she photographed. Ian's brother and co-manager Michael Cook also took the photograph.

=== Closure of I Cook Foods ===
On 21 February 2019, Chief Health Officer Brett Sutton issued an order to close down I Cook Foods. The next day, he made a press statement saying that Listeria from the catering firm is a public health threat. He declared that closure was necessary "in the interest of public safety", and stated: "The overwhelming weight of evidence to me suggests that it was from I Cook Foods." He had received a report that six samples taken from the factory were positive of listeria. He stated: "I don't want to see any more [deaths]." The Greater Dandenong City Council reported that the food company violated the food safety laws on 48 counts and made 96 charges against the company.

The closure order immediately led to the dismissal of all the 41 workers and disposal of food worth US$700,000, as well as loss of contracts from business partners. At the press conference, Sutton mistakenly stated that I Cook Foods was the sole supplier of foods to the hospital, while the hospital had several suppliers. The Department of Health did not inspect any of the other companies for listeria as it was convinced that I Cook Foods was responsible.

The food company, represented by lawyer David Brett, went to the Melbourne Magistrates' Court challenging the closure order which they claimed was without any proper evidence to indicate their food products as the cause of death at Knox hospital.

== Evidence and controversies ==
=== Death of Painter ===
The cause of Painter was believed to be due to listeria infection, as the postmortem report indicated symptoms of the infection and the bacterium in her body. The Department of Health made public awareness stating that "the woman contracted a Listeria-related illness while in hospital being treated for an unrelated condition in late January." However, later reassessment of her medical condition indicated that the main cause was a prolonged and deteriorating heart disease. The common listeria symptoms including diarrhoea and headache associated with her death were only collateral conditions. Painter's daughters' statement that their mother ate sandwiches at the Knox hospital was taken to support the link of I Cook Foods to the woman's death.

Listeria infection was quite common in Victoria, 27 cases were recorded in 2018 and already 2 in 2019 by the time of Painter's death. As Sutton publicly announced the cause of Painter's death as due to listeria, the situation was reported as listeria outbreak. He deliberated a public alert that since I Cook Foods was a major food supplier, thousands of people were at risk of the same infection. I Cook Foods provided similar food items to seven private hospitals and five aged care homes, but no other cases of infection were known.

Food auditor of Knox hospital, Gavin Buckett of the Gourmet Guardian also reported that there was no evidence of Painter eating sandwiches from I Cook Foods. Bukett wrote in his report recommending the company "be permitted to manufacture cooked chilled foods".

Sutton did not see the report on listeria linking Painter's death with the food factory. The laboratory tests were submitted only on 23 February 2019, two days after the order of closure. The report mentioned out of 25 samples collected from the I Cook Foods, listeria were detected in ham, silverside beef, egg and lettuce, and ham and cheese sandwiches of the I Cook Foods. The amount of bacteria in those samples were within the accepted level. As multiple correspondences were revealed from emails of the staff of the health department, Sutton simply decided to close the company before the test results were available. As the evidence for closure was proven negatively, the health department permitted reopening of I Cook Foods in March. In August 2019, the Greater Dandenong City Council revoked all its 96 charges before the local Magistrate Court. By then, the company had lost its workers and business contracts.

=== The slug ===
When Garlick inspected I Cook Foods premise, suspicion arose on her the moment she arrived. She appeared shabby with a coverall smock having two large apron pockets, from one of which protruded a bunch of tissue papers. As her inspection went on, she reached a corner where the security camera could not cover and where she bent down for 17 seconds. As she rose, she announced the presence of a slug on the floor. A freshly wet tissue was just adjacent to it. Garlick and Michael Cook took the photograph. The tissue paper adjacent to the slug did not appear in Garlick's report.

The case of slug became "the most telling development" in 2020, as reported by The Age when Rogerson, who had retired as the city council environmental health inspector in 2019 whistleblew against the city council. Rogerson came up with evidences from the council computer records that the photograph of the slug was edited so as to remove the bits of tissue papers lying by. She stated: "I have been away from the City of Greater Dandenong for over two years now, and only now do I feel safe to say that Dandenong Council operates under a culture of corruption and bullying."

A scientific report also indicated that it was very unlikely that a slug would wander into the house especially during that summer time. Michael Nash, a zoologist and expert on slug biology affirmed that the slug found in the factory was not the local variety and no other slugs of such kind were to be found around the premise. Nash's report also stated that a slug wandering into the house in the middle of a hot and dry day was unlikely, since slugs are nocturnal and naturally prefer damp and moist places. A police investigation on the image manipulation in 2020 did not come up with any decisive conclusion.

=== Police investigations ===
Soon after the closure of I Cook Foods, Ian Cook filed a case to the Victoria Police accusing the Greater Dandenong City Council of deliberately closing its factory and planting a slug in it. Upon investigation, Detective Sergeant Ash Penry promptly reported that he found the closure order was against procedural system and it caused destruction of US$700,000 worth of food. He also found that the listeria tests were withheld until the business contracts of I Cook Foods were terminated. Penry concluded that the closure was unlawful and that the city council acted on "a level of corruption, misuse of office and a malicious prosecution". A court case was filed against the city council but the prosecutors dropped the charges for unknown reason in October 2019.

In 2021, Penry's report, which had then remained undisclosed, leaked and from which a fresh complaint was submitted to the police. Chief Commissioner Shane Patton responded that the letter of complaint had allegations that merit investigation, and initiated a review of the case in April 2021. The police review re-opened a new investigation in June 2021. Upon examining a 61-hour CCTV footage of the company, the detectives were surprised that no investigation had been done on the staff of the city council. The police investigation was fruitless and was closed in January 2022 with a statement that the "Victoria Police can confirm no criminal action has been detected."

=== Business conspiracy ===
Rogerson said in an ABC News interview that she had "never seen Dandenong council go after a business with such ferocity." As the council and health offices were investigated on their conducts towards the closure of I Cook Foods, there were indications of the council at the heart of the circumstance. The Community Chef was at the time the main business competitor of I Cook Foods and was run as part of the stakeholders by the city council, with John Bennie, the chief executive officer of the council, having the authority.

Email records showed that original report of Buckett was changed under the direction of Pauline Maloney, of the health department, and the council employee Leanne Johnson. Although Buckett saw no evidence of Painter's death connected with I Cook Foods and recommended re-opening of the company, the health department decided to close it down.

Sutton authorised the closure in the evening of 21 February 2019 in consultation with the city council. The health department sent the city council the closure order at 10pm and formally closed I Cook Fods at 4am the next morning. A few hours later, around 10:30 am, Bennie called for a meeting of the Community Chef, which decided to offer food supply to all the clients of I Cook Foods, thereby taking over the business. The decision and action were taken before Sutton made the public announcement at 2pm.

== Parliamentary inquiry ==
=== Evidence ===
The slug case was raised at the sitting of the Parliament of Victoria in early 2020. A parliamentary inquiry was created in June 2020 under the chair of Fiona Patten, Reason Party MP. Rogerson testified before the inquiry how the slug image was manipulated and also asserted that the council authorities pressed her to make her report to indicate I Cook Foods unsanitary practices. She said that she was only a metre away from Garlick's desk as the slug photograph was on a computer screen. She saw Garlick and co-ordinator Leanne Johnson editing the image, a red circle right on the area of the tissue paper. Patten said: "We've all become quite confident that [that photo] was doctored."

Christy also testified that evidences were destroyed by the council and the origin of the listeria infection could never be established. Discussing how the council neglected important issues in the initial investigation, he said that he was prevented from detail inspection of Painter's food history in the hospital, and his question on why only a single case was found was not looked into. He also remarked that he "unequivocally certain the patient did not eat sandwiches prepared by I Cook Foods."

Sutton defended that there was "clear evidence" that Painter's listeria originated from I Cook Foods, as genetic tests showed that the bacterium in Painter were a closer match to samples found at the food company than those from other food factories. The inquiry found emails to the city council had a report which stated that Painter's listeria infection could not come from I CookFoods products as she was on a diet of soft foods supplied by other companies. Sutton claimed that the emails would not have changed his decision if he had seen them in 2019, and stood by his view that "There's no other reasonable explanation that the source... was anything other than I Cook Foods." However, he later admitted his mistake in pinpointing I Cook Foods as the sole supplier to Knox hospital, saying: "When I previously addressed the inquiry, I erroneously referred to I Cook being Knox Private Hospital's sole caterer. This is what was initially understood and had been told to me. I have since been informed that subsequent information provided by Mr Christy indicated that this was incorrect, and I do apologise for any confusion caused."

=== Conclusion ===
The inquiry agreed that the council failed in its responsibility as an authority. Among the inconsistencies of the council actions, the inquiry found an "unacceptable and improper" situation that the clients were informed by the council through emails on 21 February 2019, hours before I Cook Foods was actually notified. However, the inquiry decided that the closure was valid on the grounds of medical emergency, but not fair on the lack of procedural integrity. The inquiry submitted its first final report on 4 August 2020. The key findings were:

- The city council failed to fulfil its duty as the administrator of food safety regulator.
- The history of food safety issues at I Cook Foods Pty Ltd is overlooked by the council indicating inadequate action and execution of procedural fairness.
- The notification passed on to clients of I Cook Foods Pty Ltd before being closed was "unacceptable and improper".

As the number of evidence (as reported in the Parliament of Australia: "disturbing evidence... [of] the Victorian government in a conspiracy with Dandenong city council") mounted against the council and the health department, the inquiry was re-opened on 24 June 2021. Following the first report's recommendation on the several contradictions on the health department reports, public hearings were called on 25 August and 1 September. The second final report was submitted on 14 October 2021, with the major findings:

- I Cook Foods was not the only food supplier to Knox Private Hospital as claimed by health officials at a public hearing on 24 June 2020, and the persistent assertion as the "sole caterer" was wrong.
- Investigation came up with many allegations amounting to "criminal conduct or corruption".

== Trial and judgement ==
On 27 July 2021, Ian Cook sued the Greater Dandenong City Council and the Department of Health and Human Services for damaging his business and demanding initially US$26 (raised to US$50 by October 2021) million for reparation at the Supreme Court of Victoria. Just before the trial began, Cook withdrew the charges against the city council which was initially included as a co-defendant.

The trial started on 2 August, and the final court hearing started on 3 November 2023. There were two main issues in the court case: the validity of Sutton's order, and Sutton's reason for issuing the order. On 13 November 2023, Justice Michael McDonald ruled that the order was invalid as the health department did not oversee fair procedure in making the decision. The firm was not given any chance to make its explanation or defend its health practices. Sutton was well aware of the consequences of his orders as he declared in the trial: "I was absolutely devastated by the need to make that decision to protect vulnerable individuals."

The court exonerated Sutton on the second issue that he did not act recklessly as the situation did call for stopping the food production. It did not make any judgement on the case of the slug.

=== Aftermath ===
Ian Cook contended with the court decision on invalidating Sutton's order, but was disappointed at the rejection of the compensatory claim. Calling the verdict "bittersweet victory", he stated: "We've been doing this for ourselves and every Victorian. This government has spent millions trying to destroy us. We will continue [to fight]." He had initiated a new case against the council for deliberate planting of the slug and "malicious prosecution".
