= Underbelly Files: Infiltration =

- Genre: Crime drama
- Written by: Graeme Koetsveld
- Directed by: Grant Brown
- Starring: Sullivan Stapleton; Jessica Napier; Tottie Goldsmith; Kassandra Clementi; Valentino del Toro; Buddy Dannoun; Glenda Linscott; Henry Nixon
- Country of origin: Australia
- Original language: English

Production
- Producers: Peter Gawler; Elisa Argenzio
- Production company: Screentime

Original release
- Network: Nine Network
- Release: 14 February 2011

Related
- Underbelly Files: Tell Them Lucifer was Here; Underbelly Files: The Man Who Got Away

Underbelly Files: Infiltration is an Australian made-for-television movie that aired on 14 February 2011 on the Nine Network. It is the second of four television movies in the Underbelly Files series, the other three being Tell Them Lucifer was Here, The Man Who Got Away, and Chopper.

It tells the true story of Victorian detective Colin McLaren who posed as a shady art dealer and infiltrated the Australian branch of the Calabrian Mafia. The character Antonio Russo is loosely based on Antonio Romeo of the Honoured Society (Australia).

The ISAN production code number is 0000-0002-9A74-0002-L-0000-0000-B or 170612-2 (in shorter decimal form).

== Synopsis ==
Infiltration tells the true story of Victorian detective Colin McLaren, who posed as a shady art dealer for 18 months and infiltrated the Australian branch of the Calabrian Mafia. It resulted in the biggest win of his career, seeing 11 of Australia's most villainous mafiosi sent to prison.

== Cast ==
- Sullivan Stapleton as Colin McLaren / Cole Goodwin
- Valentino del Toro as Antonio Russo
- Buddy Dannoun as Rosario Torcaso
- Jessica Napier as Jude Gleeson / Narrator
- Roy Billing as Aussie Bob / Robert Trimbole
- Emma de Clario as Maria Russo
- Matthew Green as The Murder Victim
- Al Vila as Carlo Ricci
- Glenda Linscott as Sandra
- Henry Nixon as Leigh
- Alfredo Malabello as Vito
- Donna Matthews as Bubbles
- Richard Piper as Roger
- Fantine Banulski as Louise Russo
- Luke Christopoulos as Little Tony Russo
- Ange Arabatzis as Nico
- Brian Gore as Melbourne Associate
- Serge Vercion as Calabrian Farmer
- Mirko Grillini as Rocci Russo
- Stephen Lopez as Dominic Torcaso
- Tottie Goldsmith as Sara Herlihy
- Josh Price as Tiny
- Arthur Angel as Vinnie Messina
- Kassandra Clementi as Chelsea McLaren, Colin's daughter
- Meisha Lowe as Kim
- Natalie Pantou as Elise Messina
- Melissa Howard as Chelsea's Friend
- Susan Davidson as Monica
- Rheanna Duff as Prostitute
- Madeleine Harding as Rachel
- Rai Fazio as Massimo Falzetta
- Steve Hayden as Det. Sgt. Geoffrey Bowen
- Alex Borg as Peter Wallis
- Kevin Stewart as Police Commissioner
- Doug Bowles as Ziggy
- Adam Williams as SERT member
- Mark Goodrem as Clerk
- John Higginson as Defence barrister
- Darran Scott as Magistrate

== Ratings ==
Infiltration aired on 14 February 2011 at 8:30pm and pulled in an audience of 1.113 million viewers which ranked it the #6 rating show for that night. However it was down from the previous Underbelly telemovie which pulled in 1.377 million viewers.
