= List of The Saddle Club characters =

This is a list of characters who appear on the Australian family television series The Saddle Club, based on the book series of the same name by Bonnie Bryant about three pre-teens with a passion for horses. During the first two seasons, which aired in 2001 and 2003, the three main characters Stevie Lake, Carole Hanson, and Lisa Atwood, were played by Sophie Bennett, Keenan MacWilliam, and Lara Jean Marshall, respectively. A third season aired from 2008 to 2009.

== Carole Hanson ==
Carole is a bright African-American girl with a natural riding ability. She became devastated when her mother died of cancer, and almost gave up riding when Cobalt, one of the horses, died. Her father, U.S. Marine Colonel Mitch Hanson, reminded Carole that her mother would have wanted her to follow her passion. With money left by her mother, she bought a buckskin gelding, Starlight. Carole knows her future lies with horses, but there are many paths to follow and she does not know which road to take. Her grades are high enough for her to become a veterinarian but she would also love to breed and train Thoroughbreds. She would never mind being a professional steeplechase jockey or maybe traveling the world teaching dressage clinics. Whatever career she chooses, her most immediate goal is to be the very best rider she can be. Carole has little time for boys; therefore, she has never understood why anyone would prefer the company of a boy to that of a horse. This is when the pressures of family, friends, school, and competition cannot touch her. Anyone who catches a glimpse of horse and rider moving as one along the lush creek cannot help but be in awe. Like the other Saddle Club girls, Carole is becoming a young woman. In "Moving On, Part 1", Carole's dad got re-deployed and she almost left Pine Hollow, The Saddle Club, and Starlight behind forever when it was decided that she'd live with her Aunt Penny. Thanks to Mrs. Reg, however, Carole becomes the first live in boarder at Pine Hollow Stables as of "Moving On, Part 2" which allowed her to stay at Pine Hollow, continue to be in The Saddle Club, and keep Starlight. Carole has never forgiven Veronica for killing Cobalt. In "Itchy", Carole thought that she was allergic to horses, but after a visit to the doctor it was revealed that she is allergic to camels as the saddle blanket that her father sent her is made out of camel hair. When Carole suggests naming Samson after "Samson and Delilah", it was a hinted indication that Carole is a Christian. Whenever Carole's sad, to cheer herself up she will ride Starlight or play her guitar. Carole is focused, determined, stubborn, and passionate just like her mother was. In the books, Carole and Lisa go to Willow Creek Junior High School together and Carole and Stevie are the same age. In the "Pine Hollow" series Carole goes to Willow Creek High School with Lisa.

Played by: Seasons 1–2 – Keenan MacWilliam Season 3 – Victoria Campbell

== Stevie Lake ==
Stevie dropped her given name, Stephanie, and has always been tomboyish. Now being uncomfortable with the activities other girls of her age do, but at the same time getting tired of being "one of the boys", one thing remains: her love of horses. Stevie is the unsinkable, unstoppable clown and prankster of the Saddle Club. Stevie practices practical jokes so much because her three brothers have driven her more sensitive side underground. She does not think things through and will embark on some impetuous, hare-brained schemes, sucking Carole and Lisa into it on the way through, and when everything gets out of hand, it is her two friends who would have to bail everybody out of the mess. But Stevie is irrepressible and unflappable and moves straight onto the next scheme or caper, leaving Carole and Lisa preparing for the worst again. However, they do not mind her pranks too much if Veronica is the target, as she often is. Stevie's parents, George and Catherine, are both lawyers with hectic schedules. They both worked hard for everything they achieved and are determined to instill a solid work ethic in their children; they agreed to pay for one riding lesson a week, but also insisted that Stevie work at the barn in exchange for additional lessons. She is impulsive, stubborn, sarcastic, and often gets into trouble outside of the show ring. On "The Mountain Trail Overnight", she meets Phil Marsten, who develops a crush on her; they begin dating later on in the series, and she is so far the only one of the trio to have a life-lasting boyfriend. Stevie rode Comanche until she rescues Belle; Stevie was allowed to keep Belle after her original owner realizes that they belong together. Stevie found learning to ride Belle difficult at first, as she was such a high-strung and mighty horse, but after time Stevie could just walk outside into the paddock and call her and Belle would be there in a second or less. Stevie has a bad temper, but when she enters the show ring, she becomes another person. When not dressed for the riding ring, Stevie has a funky, urban style of her own. She loves vintage clothing stores and often makes a bold, if sometimes outrageous, fashion statement. Her younger brother, Michael, is an ultimate pest and seizes any opportunity to aggravate and annoy his sister, and her older brother, Chad, seems to do nothing to dissuade Michael from irritating Stevie He is the one who started the family tradition of practical jokes. Even though her twin brother, Alex, plays his share of jokes on Stevie, he is fiercely protective of his sister. Alex likes to remind Stevie that he is older than her by six and a half minutes. Stevie's strongest events in riding are cross-country equestrianism and dressage. Stevie also works to pay for Belle's board. In the books, Stevie and Veronica go to Fenton Hall Academy together, and Stevie's family lives in the same neighborhood as Lisa's family. Stevie's favorite color is blue.

Played by: Seasons 1–2 – Sophie Bennett Season 3 – Lauren Dixon

== Lisa Atwood ==
Lisa is an English Australian Straight-A student who was named after her Aunt Elizabeth. She is of English-American descent. When she started riding, she did not know she would like it very much. Since her mother makes her do everything that she believes a young lady must do, she figured it was just another one of those things. Lisa is a perfectionist, encouraged by her mother to be best at everything, but is also completely loyal to her friends, though she has a bit of a wandering eye when it comes to boys. She has a series of little crushes but does not often act on them. Lisa has another unexpected side to her character: horses, which bring it out. Although an overachiever, she has a way with horses and all other animals which seems to be almost uncanny to some; this bond and intuition with horses is particularly strong when it comes to the wild stallion, Diablo. Her first horse was Patch until she got Prancer, an ex-racehorse that Lisa loves and is determined to make into a champion show jumper. However, she is afraid of her mother, and because of this, she always strives to be a bit better than everybody else is. Although there is always that edge of rivalry between them to keep things interesting, she is really a loyal friend to Carole and Stevie. Lisa gets on well with boys, and they really respond to her because she is a great listener about any problem they might have, and the advice she gives is spot-on. As well as riding lessons, Lisa takes ballet, clarinet, art, and tennis classes, and she often wishes she has less to do. Lisa has grown from her initial insecure start at Pine Hollow to being an integral part of the place with close bonds with Stevie and Carole. Lisa's strongest event in riding is jumping. Lisa's equestrian skills have developed to where they rival, if not overtake, those of her companions who have been riding longer. Lisa also excels at making milkshakes. In "Itchy," Lisa tells Carole that she is allergic to daisies after she gave her some as an apology present for getting mad at her when Lisa did the right thing by telling Mrs. Reg about her allergy symptoms. In Season 3, Lisa has a pink grooming kit for Prancer. Lisa used to bite her nails until "School Horse", an," n that same episode, she hungers in for jelly beans. In the books, Lisa attends Willow Creek Junior High with Carole, and she is a year older than Carole and Stevie. In the "Pine Hollow" series Lisa, goes to Willow Creek High School with Carole. Lisa's favorite color is orange.

Played by: Lara Jean Marshall (Seasons 1–2), Ariel Kaplan (Season 3)

== Veronica DiAngelo ==
Veronica is the spoiled daughter of a wealthy Italian-Australian businessman, Frank DiAngelo, and his wife, Helen DiAngelo. Veronica is a big-headed, pompous individual who thinks she is better than everyone else. She is often rude, insulting, mean, witty, and loves boys. She likes riding expensive Thoroughbreds but has little interest in caring for them. Despite stepping all over people and tearing them down to get what she wants, she is proven to be a good friend to Kristi and Desi. Deep down, Veronica is lonely. All Veronica really wants is for her parents to spend time with her. Veronica is jealous of The Saddle Club's friendship and secretly wants to be friends with them. Veronica pretends to be nice in front of Mrs. Atwood. In the first series, Veronica causes her horse, Cobalt, to have a fatal accident. After Cobalt's death, Veronica temporarily rode Patch after Prancer was assigned to Lisa. Veronica's parents buy her a new horse, Garnet, a new beautiful chestnut mare. At first, she does not like Garnet but gradually starts to like her after Kristi says that she might buy her off of Veronica. She attended school with The Saddle Club but was happier at an elite girls' school she attended before her parents bought the estate at Pine Hollow. Veronica becomes interested in Phil Marsten because his family owns land and breeds Arabian horses. When her father's finances suffer in Season 2, she winds up working at the stables to cover Garnet's board and her lessons. For a while, Veronica seems to find Scooter annoying but gradually grows to like him. In "Greener Pastures Part 1" after Cobalt's accident she was worried about Cobalt and wanted to stay with him instead of getting her arm x-rayed after their jumping accident indicating that deep down she really cared about Cobalt and did not realize how much she loved him until it was too late. As of Season 3, Veronica talks to Kristi via her cell phone. In Season 3, we learn that Veronica is Italian. Veronica has shown her caring side when she warned Lisa that Storm was dangerous and that the first chance that he got he'd hurt her and when she tried to protect Simon by saying that Midnight could kill him when Desi's father decided to put him down instead of selling him. In the "Pine Hollow" series, Veronica quits riding after she develops an interest in boys. Veronica's favorite color is Red.

Played by: Heli Simpson (Seasons 1–2), Marny Kennedy (Season 3)

== Kristi Cavanaugh ==
Kristi is Veronica's closest ally and best friend. She also comes from a wealthy family. Kristi is known as the stable flirt, more interesting in catching boys' attention with expensive riding clothes than in learning to ride. She first arrives in Pine Hollow as a guest of Veronica but signs up quickly after seeing some of the cute stable hands and riders. She does not have the same dislike for The Saddle Club as Veronica but does not bond with them either. To her, they are too immature and far too poor. She also has a crush on Red, Pine Hollow's stable hand. In "Bloodlines", thanks to The Saddle Club, Kristi learns that Chelsea Smith is her long-lost big sister. Kristi has never forgiven Veronica for almost making Red quit Pine Hollow again in "High Stakes Part 1" and in "High Stakes Part 2". Kristi has never forgiven Stevie for saying that it was her fault that Pepper got too old in "The Home Straight". Kristi would love to be a member of The Saddle Club, but she is pulled back by Veronica. Sometimes Kristi will wear a pendant of a broken heart that Mr. Cavanaugh gave Kristi for her 8th birthday. In "High Horse" Kristi discovers that she is a horse whisperer. Like Veronica, Kristi became friends with Ashley and Melanie. Kristi is on Thoroughly Horse's file to be a model. In the books Kristi's name is Betsy and she is one of Veronica's three best friends. Kristi rides Mrs. Reg's horse Barq. In Season 2, Kristi would often ride Comanche. After Season 2, for some unknown reason she left, although Veronica can be seen calling her. Kristi's favorite color is black.

Played by: Kia Luby (Seasons 1–2)

== Desi Biggins ==
Desi is a beautiful and shy, rather sweet upper-class Black Australian girl. She has been a member of a Pony Club since she was little and now that her family has moved to Willow Creek she can spend even more time on her beloved hobby. Desi, like Veronica and Carole, is an only child. When Desi first arrives at Pine Hollow she is ignored by Veronica and taken under the wing of The Saddle Club. It is only when Veronica learns that Desi is the daughter of Barry Biggins, a real estate magnate who has just sold his property development business for some forty million dollars, that Veronica woos the newcomer, changes her tune and cozies up to Desi. But as Desi settles into Pine Hollow she slowly carves out a niche for herself, managing not to fall out with The Saddle Club, as well as being Veronica's ally, a balancing act that indicates just how politically adept she is. Throughout the series, Desi also befriends new Pine Hollow student Simon Atherton, much to the annoyance of Veronica. Desi appreciates Simon's wit and his ability to deal with Veronica on her own sneaky terms, able to see his potential as a good rider and all-round nice guy. Desi is sensitive to paprika. It is hinted that Desi has a crush on Simon. Desi's catchphrase is, "Uh Veronica." In the books, Desi's name is Polly Giacomin. Desi's favorite colors are watermelon pink and aquamarine blue.

Played by: Aisha Dee (Season 3)

== Recurring Characters ==
- Phil Marsten is Stevie's boyfriend and a member of Pine Hollow's rival pony club Cross Country Pony Club but he signs up for Saturday lessons at Pine Hollow in "Trail Ride Part 2". Intensely competitive with Stevie, the two often try to outdo one another. It is obvious that the two are attracted to one another, but they argue so much they cannot see it themselves. They finally get together in "Bridle Path Part 2". In the books when Stevie and Phil meet they fall in love with each other instantly and they begin dating. He usually rides his horse Teddy western-style but also rides him English in Season 2. Phil has sisters. In "Join Up" Phil started to take Hip Hop dancing lessons. Phil collects stamps. Phil will never forgive Kristi and Veronica for accusing him of poisoning Starlight, Belle, Prancer, Garnet, and Comanche in "Race Against Time". Stevie and Phil's relationship starts to play a major part of Season 2, but are they destined to be girlfriend and boyfriend? Phil is Murray's best friend. In the books, Phil meets The Saddle Club at a Horseback Riding Camp and his best friend is A.J. McDonnell.

Played by: Glenn Meldrum (Seasons 1–2), Cosmo Feltham (Season 3)

- Murray Richards is an ex army brat. Murray's having a tough time because of Private Richard's death. Carole and Murray do not get along at first and the only things they have in common are a love of horses and a love of riding. Murray owed some thugs a lot of money because he wanted to pay off his dad's gambling debts since his father had a gambling problem. Murray even helped those thugs horse-nap Garnet, but in the end, Carole helped Murray get out of trouble and they put aside their differences once and for all. Murray may seem like a creep when you first meet him, but in reality, he is upset about his father. Now his mother and stepfather breed Quarter Horses. He is a great rough rider. He loves the freedom of riding. A couple of his horses are on assignment at Pine Hollow and he loves going there to hang out with his best friend Phil. Together the boys would rather play pranks and muck up than conform to the structure of pony club. Murray's favorite color is Green. In the books Murray's last name is Langdon and he is three years older than Carole.

Played by: Troy Lovett (Season 2), Rory Donegan (Season 3)

- Simon Atherton has packed a lot into his 13 years: travel, relationships, education, hobbies. The only trouble is it is all digital – Simon is a computer geek. To him, real life is a very inefficient way to get experience. His parents are research scientists who travel the world attending conferences and have parked him with his aunt and uncle in Willow Creek. Simon's interpersonal skills are shaky so he spends a lot of time in his room with his next-generation computer. Afraid that he will grow an electrode out of his head, Roy and Gaye insist that he get out more, join a club. The only local clubs are the footy club and Pine Hollow Riding School. Simon went online and quickly figured out that twenty or so hefty guys going for the same ball was a fraught situation and the expression 'injury time' nagged at him. Riding a horse looked much more straightforward, particularly since the search engine led him to a lot of caper westerns. He has a good heart and would never knowingly cause harm to anybody. He really likes the girls at Pine Hollow because they treat him like one of them so he feels less like a geek, and eventually comes to prefer their company to his Nintendo DS. He gets on very well with Desi and it is hinted that he has a crush on her. He is the go-to man for anyone who needs IT assistance at Pine Hollow and wants to position the Regnery database on the information superhighway with amusing results. It is hinted that Simon has a crush on Desi. In the episode "Brothers and Sisters" The Saddle Club asked Simon to join the Saddle Club, much to Desi's displeasure, but he decides not to join when he finds out how Desi feels. Simon's favorite color is Black.

Played by: Connor Jessup (Season 3)

- Melanie Atwood is Lisa's little sister. She can be quite mischievous and sometimes a little bit cheeky. Sometimes she may seem bossy, but for the most part, she is a nice girl. Melanie has now been enrolled at Pine Hollow and unfortunately for Lisa, this means she will always be underfoot. She always sees herself in competition with her older sister. It drives Lisa mad but Melanie loves her and thinks the world of her. This does not, however, stop her from trying to outdo or embarrass her. Melanie is always spying on Lisa and telling on her. It also seems that Melanie is jealous of Lisa's friendship with The Saddle Club because she does not like to share Lisa with Carole and Stevie. According to Melanie, singing is in her family's genes. Melanie will never forgive Lisa for saying "You are so awful." in "Bloodlines" after she embarrassed Lisa by adding a personal picture of Lisa on her school project about family trees. Cute and lovable, Melanie is very mischievous and will urge Ashley and Jess to join her crazy schemes only to play the innocent when they are caught. Melanie is an inquisitive girl. Like Ashley, Melanie became friends with Kristi and Veronica. Melanie agreed with Ashley when she said that Veronica's a hot dresser. Melanie looks up to Lisa and thinks that her big sister is cool. Melanie was the youngest rider at Pine Hollow until Jess came along. Melanie will usually have her video camera with her always on hand to record a video diary of Pine Hollow or better still, any incident which may embarrass the older girls. In Season 2, she and Ashley write a newsletter featuring any embarrassing snippet about the older girls which they think should reach a wider audience. Melanie sometimes does not realize it but she gets in Lisa's way, a lot! Melanie is no underachiever and like Lisa, she is very good at the things she does, except, every time, she seems to outdo Lisa, but Lisa is determined to make riding an exception on Melanie's list. Melanie is very spoiled by her mother and sometimes Lisa feels a little unloved. In the books, Lisa is an only child and does not have any siblings, so Melanie is non-existence.

Played by: Marisa Siketa (Season 1), Jessica Jacobs (Season 2), Ella-Rose Sherman (Season 3)

- Ashley Taylor is Melanie's best friend. She is smart, but she does not always show it. She is very caring about her friends and likes to make sure everyone is okay. Ashley is a high-spirited girl who takes on any challenge with enthusiasm. Not an exceptional student, Ashley shines at her dancing and singing classes. A bit of a Princess, her family were surprised when she asked if she could learn to ride. She loves the ponies and enjoys the lessons but more than anything loves the people at Pine Hollow. In Season 2, Ashley would often wear a blue ribbon in her hair. In "Show Ponies Part 1" Ashley rode Comanche. Veronica gave Ashley her coat after it shrunk in the wash since it would not fit her anymore. In "Trail Ride Part 1" we learn that Ashley has a sister and that Ashley's mother was making her miss the Mountain Trail Overnight to attend her sister's birthday party. Ashley was the youngest rider at Pine Hollow until Melanie came along. Like Melanie, Ashley became friends with Kristi and Veronica. Ashley and Melanie are always up to something especially if it means a way to make some money or gain some notoriety. These schemes and pranks usually end in some kind of disaster much to the amusement of everyone except Lisa who is constantly embarrassed by the girl's antics. hit it off right away even though there's plenty of competition between them. Ashley is happy to go along with all of Melanie's harebrained ideas even when she knows they could get into a lot of trouble. In Season 2 Ashley would ride Comanche once in a while. After Season 2, Ashley is not seen or mentioned again. Ashley's favorite color is Green.

Played by: Janelle Corlass-Brown (Seasons 1–2)

- Jess Cooper is Melanie's new best friend. Jess is New to Pine Hollow. Her family are carnival folks and follows rodeos around the country. The homeschooling just was not working for her, and she is spending the rest of the year with her grandfather in Willow Creek and attending the local high school. At Pine Hollow, Melanie who is missing her friend Ashley immediately befriends her. Jess has a few tricks of her own and is more than an equal match for Melanie and her crazy ideas and schemes. When Jess was in the circus she rode horses, juggled, and told fortunes for a dollar. Jess's favorite color is Light Blue.

Played by: Kaiya Jones (Season 3)

- Red O'Malley is the head Irish-Australian stable hand at Pine Hollow. Seventeen years old and good looking, he is well regarded by the girls for his skills with the horses, both riding and in the stable. The Saddle Club helped Red deal with his past, which has allowed him to ride again. Veronica treats him poorly, but Kristi tends to follow him around. Red has never forgiven Veronica for treating him like crud. In Season 2 Red got his instructor credibility. Red quit riding before he came to Pine Hollow after Greenwood burned down due to a barn fire. Red's riding team was training for the nationals when he blew it in one of the trials. Red's trainer was mad, and they got into a fight. It was Red's job to check and make sure that everything was O.K. for the night when the barn caught on fire. They did not get all of the horses out in time and the horses were so badly burnt that they had to put two of them down, and one was Red's horse Joker. According to Red, Joker was the most incredible horse, that they had a special bond, and that Joker would have done anything for Red. Jake and Red play the guitar. After Season 2, Red left for an unknown reason.

Played by: Nathan Phillips (Season 1), James O'Dea (Season 2)

- Jack O'Neil is an Irish-Australian country boy with a yearning for the city. He is a talented rider and wants to become a world-famous trainer. Most of the girls are attracted to him except for Veronica, who thinks he is crass and way beneath her. Jack is the new Stable Hand at Pine Hollow.

Played by: Troy Lovett (Season 3)

- Max Regnery is the nice, very handsome, cheeky owner and manager of Pine Hollow Stables, Deborah's husband, Mrs. Reg's son, and Drew's cousin. He co-runs the stable with Mrs. Reg. He is also the riding instructor. He is a kind and generous man and is always there to help out when there's a problem. He is an extremely skilled rider, however, likes to sit back and let others do 'circus riding' when the horses go awol. He has won numerous awards and competitions as a young man and is seen as a mentor and friend by his students. He loves Carole, Stevie, and Lisa and is a father-figure to them, and when Carole's father gets stationed overseas, she goes to live with Max and his mother. He also has a firm side and has little tolerance for bullying and nonsense. In the first season, he meets Deborah Hale, a local journalist with a city paper, who does not like horses as much as he does. The two fall in love and get married by the end of the first season. In the second season, Max goes away to France for three months to take master equitation classes. His cousin, Drew, takes the helm for him in his absence. Max usually does not let beginning riders go on The Mountain Trail Overnight. Max and Deborah live at Pine Hollow with Mrs. Reg. According to Max Lisa has a real talent for Jumping. In the books, one of Max's rules is that the students at Pine Hollow get good grades at school in order to ride. Max's favorite color is Red.

Played by: Brett Tucker (Seasons 1–2), Richard Davies (Season 3)

- Deborah Hale Regnery is Max's wife, Mrs. Reg's daughter-in-law, and Drew's cousin-in-law. Deborah is a reporter for the local city newspaper called "The Daily News". Before moving to the country, Deborah lived in a condo in the city. When she married Max, she gave up her city life and now lives at Pine Hollow with Max and Mrs. Reg. Deborah is still getting used to country life. Deborah used to wear pantsuits and dresses and other fancy clothes. Now she wears T-shirts and jeans. Deborah's afraid of horses, and Max gets mad when she does not want to be around horses. Deborah's slowly overcoming her fear of horses. Deborah's been taking riding lessons and making great progress. In "First Refusal" Deborah proposed to Max on horseback and he said yes. Deborah's always wanted to learn how to play the guitar. Deborah thinks that Pine Hollow is relaxing. After "Join Up" Deborah went back to France with Max and does not come back home with Max after it seems like Pine Hollow is going to be sold. After Season 2 Deborah is not seen or mentioned again.

Played by: Cathy Godbold (Seasons 1–2)

- Elizabeth Regnery "Mrs. Reg" is Max's mother and co-owner of the stables. She used to be an Olympic rider until she had a hip replacement surgery. Mrs. Reg still rides, though. She is a caring woman who The Saddle Club often go to for advice. Mrs. Reg is into old home remedies and gives good advice. Mrs. Reg has a home remedy for poison ivy that she has perfected over the years and it really works. In the books, Mrs. Reg plans all of the events at Pine Hollow. In "Track Record" Mrs. Reg told Red that she knew he did not start the barn fire and that there is not much that she does not see. In Red, Mrs. Reg sees a dedicated stable hand who would rather hurt himself than hurt a horse and that he is a consensus. Mrs. Reg is Deborah's mother-in-law and Drew's aunt. In "Don't Give a Hoot" Mrs. Reg becomes the new riding instructor at Pine Hollow. In the "Pine Hollow" series Mrs. Reg retires from Pine Hollow and moves to Florida.

Played by: Catherine Wilkin (Seasons 1–2), Briony Behets (Season 3)

- Dorothée Doutey is seventeen, and is beautiful and mercurial. She comes to Pine Hollow to straighten herself out. Six months before she arrived in Australia, she was Junior European Eventing Champion, but her career underwent a huge setback when she had a serious fall while competing at Badminton. She broke her pelvis and spent eight weeks in hospital, but she suffered an even bigger psychological trauma. There was a feeling on the part of the judges that she pushed her young horse Hugo too hard, and this is what occasioned the accident. She has completely lost her self-confidence and seems to be in denial about her whole horse-riding life. She has become withdrawn and solitary. Her worried parents decide to send her to Pine Hollow hoping that the change of scenery might jog her out of her despondency and, as an added bonus, they send her beloved horse, Hugo, onto Pine Hollow to be waiting for her when she arrives. The Saddle Club is intrigued by this enigmatic young woman and become determined to get to the bottom of her mystery.

Played by: Matylda Buczko (Season 2)

- Drew Regenery is Max's cousin. When Max is invited to France to work in a state-of-the-art, warm-blood breeding barn, Drew jumps at the chance to step into Max's shoes. He has an entrepreneur's spirit, and he has always thought that Pine Hollow could be better run. Sure, he is always like Max, but in his view, Max was a little bit too down-home and countrified. Drew is a nice sunny-natured person, so he does not make any sweeping changes, to begin with, but he is determined to put Pine Hollow on a more business-like footing, and this leads him into forging a business relationship with Mr. DiAngelo, but that is quite a way down the trail yet. His desire to fix Pine Hollow's bottom line has an unexpected effect on Deborah. She realizes how important the Regnery tradition is at Pine Hollow and so she finds herself defending the traditional way things are done, out of loyalty to Max and Mrs. Regnery. So Deborah, the thoroughly modern young woman, shows herself to be conservative at heart. But Drew is not just an entrepreneur. He is a very good people person and a lot of fun. The girls all take to him because of his good humor and charm, and he is raffish in a way Max never was.

Played by: Nikolai Nikolaeff (Season 2)

- Scooter Mulcahy is a charming youth with a roguish sense of humor. He loves computers because he approves of the way they do your thinking for you, while you get on with other schemes. Like the alchemists of old, Scooter likes the idea of turning lead into gold, setting a system up and then sitting back and counting the returns. That is why he wants to be the manager of the Saddle Club Singers. Lisa, Stevie, and Carole will do the hard work and he does the hard bargaining – everybody wins especially him. He has mastered AI technology and lives in the hope that one day he will be able to write a program which will provide him with the key to wealth, fast cars and wall-to-wall computer games. Everybody at Pine Hollow likes Scooter because of his happy-go-lucky nature and a general air of devilment. He loves a laugh and is a very good company and will stop you working at the drop of a hat. He is employed around Pine Hollow to install a computer system and as a general 'gofer'. Pine Hollow does not have a lot of money to spend so Scooter is doing everything on the cheap, using cannibalized computer parts. Scooter is an irrepressible, puckish scallywag and this appalls Veronica who sees his presence at Pine Hollow as another sign of declining standards. But that is Veronica – everybody else finds Scooter very entertaining. And he has as many angles as the Eiffel Tower.

Played by: Alex Marriott (Season 2)

- Megan A girl who rides at Pine Hollow. Veronica seems to be one of her friends, but we never really find out if she is. Her favorite color is pink.

Played by: Sophie Hensser (Season 1)

== Horses ==
=== Starlight ===
Originally called Pretty Boy. A six-year-old buckskin Trakehner gelding with a blaze and a star. He belongs to Carole. Carole bought Starlight with the money her mother left her after she died from cancer. Carole almost sold Starlight in "Greener Pastures Part 2" after the devastating loss of Cobalt. Starlight almost joined the Army in "Moving On Part 2" when it seems that Carole will be leaving Pine Hollow and The Saddle Club forever when her dad is deployed overseas. Starlight can be a bully sometimes but is mostly gentle and affectionate. Starlight is also intuitive and seems to know just what Carole wants before she asks anything of him. Starlight was called "She" in Season 1 and "Girl" twice in Season 2. Starlight is Prancer's pasture mate. In the books, Starlight's registered name is Pretty Boy Floyd, and he is a bay part Thoroughbred gelding who Carole gets as a Christmas present from her dad after Lisa tells Colonel Hanson about Starlight when Mr. and Mrs. Atwood wanted to buy him for Lisa. Lisa knew that she was not ready for her own horse yet.

=== Belle ===
Originally called Blackie. A seven-year-old black Arabian/Saddlebred mare with a star was discovered by Stevie struggling to survive in the wilderness. She belongs to Stevie as of Episode 18. She is a high spirited horse and one of the strongest in the stable. Stevie first encountered Belle during a western riding clinic. Belle appeared dirty and straggly with rain rot patches on her back. Stevie rescued the abandoned mare and brought her to the stable to clean her up. Not long after claiming her thanks to Deborah, Belle's rightful owner, Chelsea Owens came to reclaim the horse. Belle, not wanting to return to her first owner, broke out and ran away, but returned when Stevie went out to look for her to say good-bye. Realizing that Belle and Stevie belong together, Chelsea did the right thing and brought Belle back to Pine Hollow. As Stevie nursed the mare back to health, the two formed a special bond. Stevie named her after The Phantom Horse in a story that Max told. Belle almost died from lead poisoning in "Tender Foot" but thanks to Doctor Whiteside Belle's life is saved after Lisa discovered a splinter in Belle's leg that was painted with lead paint from the jumps. Belle was poisoned in "Lisa's Choice Part 1" and "Lisa's Choice Part 2" because of Veronica. Belle is Teddy's girlfriend. In the books, Belle is bay like Starlight and Prancer, and she is originally called Punctuation "Punk".

=== Prancer ===
A three-year-old chestnut Thoroughbred mare with white socks, a white spot on her nose, and a star. She is ridden by Lisa as of Episode 12. Prancer is a beautiful ex-racehorse that Carole would exercise for racehorse owner David McLeod until the mare sprained a ligament and a fed-up McLeod made plans to sell her for slaughter. The girls made plans of their own to rescue Prancer by "horse napping" her in the middle of the night and hiding out in Max and Mrs. Reg's old barn. Max bought Prancer and with the help of The Saddle Club, started training her as a school horse. She saved Carole, Stevie, and Lisa from a poisonous snake, after running away due to the fact that she was going to be sold and The Saddle Club went looking for her but fell into an old, abandoned mine shaft. With the proper training, Lisa believes that Prancer can become a champion showjumper. In "Jumping to Conclusions" Veronica rode Prancer for one lesson. Prancer helps Liam save Lisa's life when she had to have an emergency appendectomy due to stress from school, homework, ballet, clarinet lessons, riding lessons, and babysitting. Prancer is Starlight's pasture mate. Prancer and Starlight are best friends. In the books, Prancer is bay like Starlight and Belle, and she has a Whiteface and Max and Doctor Judy, both own her. In the "Pine Hollow" series Prancer dies along with her twin foals during a difficult pregnancy before Mr. Atwood can buy her for Lisa. In Season 3, Prancer is solid chestnut.

=== Garnet ===
A seven-year-old liver chestnut Arabian mare with a blaze. She belongs to Veronica as of Episode 13. Veronica's parents buy her after Cobalt must be put down. Veronica did not want Garnet originally because she so desperately wanted a stallion, and she even asked her dad to send her back. Veronica even said that Garnet was not better than Cobalt, but she loves her even though Carole tends to care for her more. Garnet gets stolen in "Horse Napped" and thanks to Carole's quick thinking and the help of Stevie, Phil, Scooter, Murray, and Red, Carole manages to get Garnet back to the stables without Veronica noticing. Veronica sold Garnet in "Horse's Keeper" to avoid working at Pine Hollow to pay for Garnet's board and to avoid having Stevie be her supervisor. She later regrets her decision. Thanks to The Saddle Club Veronica gets Garnet back and promises to look after her more often. In "Back in The Saddle" Veronica told Garnet that she hated her, and when she ran away Veronica told Garnet that she loved her. In reality, Garnet ran back to Pine Hollow to let The Saddle Club know that Veronica was in trouble and needed help. Garnet was called "He", "His", and "He's" in Season 2 and then they started called Garnet "She" again in Season 2 just like Bonnie Bryant did in the books. Now the pride of Pine Hollow Stables, Garnet is a well-trained dressage horse that performed at competition level with her previous owners. Garnet is a fantastic jumper. In "Stable Farewell" Veronica sells Garnet after her parents give her Go for Blue "Danny", a well-trained dapple-grey thoroughbred for Christmas.

=== Comanche ===
A nine-year-old bay gelding with a white blaze on his face and a thick shaggy mane and tail. He was one of the original school horses that Max bought when he took over Pine Hollow after his dad died. Comanche is an easy-going horse with an even temper, although he often gets spooked. He is ridden by Stevie until "Found Horse Part 2". Stevie still takes time to look after Comanche, often taking him and Belle on picnics. Stevie checks on Comanche's well-being. He is ridden by Sam as of Episode 18, but in Season 2 Danny rode Comanche, but sometimes Kristi and Ashley would ride Comanche. In the second season, Comanche was almost put down when it was thought that he had contracted an equine virus, when in reality he had colic after Ashley and Melanie let him eat freshly cut grass from an empty pasture that Red mowed while they were riding on him and playing Capture the Flag. Mrs. Reg recommended that Lisa ride Comanche or Barq in Season 3. Comanche is afraid of thunderstorms and mud puddles. In "The Ride of His Life" a helicopter spooked Comanche when Stevie decided to let him see the area around Pine Hollow one last time when she thought he had the equine virus. In "The Saddle Club" Comanche got spooked after Red changed his food when Lisa's cell phone rang when Mrs. Atwood called right in the middle of the lesson, and when Veronica put her pager under Comanche's saddle. In the books, Comanche is chestnut, and Lisa rode him once before Pepper retired.

=== Patch ===
A gorgeous twelve-year-old dark bay and white pinto skewbald gelding. He is ridden by Lisa until "Jumping to Conclusions". Veronica was forced to ride Patch after Cobalt kicked the bucket until she got Garnet in Episode 13. Patch is the pony that all new riders start on. He is a smart little pony, sometimes referred to as "Push-Button" since he stays focused and does not get spooked easily. His nickname is "Push-Button Patch". Quiet and kind, Patch is the perfect teacher. Patch is not seen or mentioned in Season 2. However, Patch is mentioned one time in "Staying the Distance". He is one of Pine Hollow's school horses. In the books, Lisa rode Patch only once.

=== Cobalt ===
A six-year-old black Thoroughbred stallion. He belonged to Veronica until Episode 10. He was a skilled jumper and hated being loaded into horse trailers. Veronica took no interest in caring for him. Carole had a deep relationship with Cobalt, and often took him out on hacks and jumping. After Veronica pushed him too hard in a jumping contest in "Greener Pastures Part 1", he suffered irreparable fractures, and there was no choice but to put him down. Before his death, Delilah was bred to Cobalt and later gave birth to his only son, Samson. After Veronica fell off of Cobalt on the Mountain Trail Overnight, Cobalt galloped back to camp to let everyone know that Veronica was in trouble and needed help. Even though Veronica refused to take care of Cobalt he still loved her, but Cobalt loved Carole more. Cobalt was brave, proud, and sometimes hot-tempered, but he had a gentle soul and a big heart. Cobalt was the most expensive horse in Willow Creek. Carole associated Cobalt's death with her mother. The last words that Cobalt heard before he died were Carole saying, "I love you."

=== Delilah ===
A nine-year-old Palomino Thoroughbred mare with a white blaze. She is sweet, but temperamental and belongs to Max. Carole rode Delilah until she bought Starlight. Delilah was bred to Cobalt seven months before his death. Carole was originally the only one at Pine Hollow the night she gave birth until Stevie and Lisa did the right thing and gave up their plans and joined her as originally planned. She gave birth to a colt, whom the girls name Samson, after the biblical story of Samson and Delilah. Veronica mocks them the following day, later exclaiming to Kristi that it is "just a foal" when it is time for Stevie's other best friend Tina to go back home after her yearly visit with Stevie. Max rode Delilah on the Mountain Trail Overnight. The Saddle Club calls Delilah the stable flirt. Like Patch, Nickel, and Samson, Delilah is not seen or mentioned in Season 2. Delilah is briefly seen in Season 3. In "Flying Change" Delilah got mastitis. In the books, Delilah dies from the equine virus.

=== Samson ===
A three-month-old Bay Thoroughbred colt. He is Delilah and Cobalt's foal, named after the popular bible story of Samson and Delilah. Like Patch, Delilah, and Nickel Samson is not seen or mentioned in Season 2. In the books, Samson is black like Cobalt. In "Flying Change" when Delilah got mastitis, Melanie would feed Samson during the day so Doctor Judy would not have to put a tube down his throat to make him eat. Red looked after the foal overnight. In the "Pine Hollow" series Carole made plans to sell Starlight and buy Samson after he was returned to Pine Hollow when his owner died, but she was unable to complete her plans due to being grounded for cheating on her history test when her grades slipped.

=== Barq ===
A ten-year-old white Arabian gelding. He belongs to Mrs. Reg. He is ridden by Kristi until Season 2 though she did not frequently care for him, often leaving other people to do the work for her. In "Blind Faith" Beth Elliott rode Barq when she, The Saddle Club, and Max went to look for Jenna after she snuck off and went for a ride with Liam. When Max first met Barq his owner was going to put him down. Mrs. Reg bought Barq for Max and he turned out to be one of the best school horses Pine Hollow ever had. Mrs. Reg rides Barq in lessons. Desi rides Barq until Mr. Biggins buys Jellybean for her. In the books, Lisa rides Barq as well as Prancer after Pepper is retired. In "Horse Sense", Veronica rides Barq after Cobalt dies until her parents buy Garnet in "Horse Wise". Barq's name means Lightning in Arabic. In the books Barq is chestnut.

=== Pepper ===
Originally called Clyde. A twenty-eight-year-old dapple grey Appaloosa mustang gelding, whom Max's father rescued from poachers when he was just a yearling. He is ridden by Sam until Episode 18. Kristi rode Pepper only once in "The Home Straight". He is retired and sold to Bud in Season 2. When Pepper's mother, Licorice, went into labor she had a tough time and Bud stayed with Licorice to keep her company and became friends with Pepper when he was born. Stevie learned how to ride on Pepper. After "The Home Straight" Pepper is not mentioned again. In the books, Pepper is ridden by Lisa until he is put out to pasture, and when he is put down in "Autumn Trail".

=== Teddy ===
Phil's handsome Palomino American Quarter Horse gelding. He does not board at Pine Hollow, but he is trailered in for lessons. He spooks easily on the trail and is afraid of loud noises and bad weather. Teddy is Belle's boyfriend.

=== Hugo ===
A French champion dressage horse. A big, sweet grey Andalusian with white socks, a 'crescent of A' brand, and a moon shaped mark on his hindquarters. He is owned by Dorothée. Dorothée almost sold Hugo to Veronica in "Show Ponies Part 2" until he acted up when Veronica was riding him. Dorothée has been riding Hugo again ever since. In the books, Hugo's name is Topside, he is bay, and he is ridden by Stevie until she gets Belle in "Gift Horse".

=== Dime ===
A temperamental white pony with a shaggy mane. Throws riders at least three times a week. Pins back his ears when he is upset. Dime bites. Ashley rode Dime until Episode 9. He is ridden by Melanie as of "Hardbound". In Season 3, Dime is bay.

=== Penny ===
A sweet-natured white Haflinger mare. She is very attached to Dime. Penny always gets up to all manner of mischief. She is ridden by Megan. In Season 3, Penny is ridden by Jess. In Season 3, Penny is bay.

=== Diablo ===
A wild big black Friesian horse. He was originally owned by Rafael, and they shared a very special rapport. Rafael often let him wander, and Diablo always came back to where Rafael was. When Nevil stole the money that Rafael's family-owned he had to sell Diablo to Lisa. In the end, Lisa let Diablo go so he could run free in the wild just like when he'd ask Rafael to be allowed to roam. Diablo returns to Pine Hollow in "Lisa's Choice Part 1" and "Lisa's Choice Part 2". Despite being apart, Lisa and Diablo share a unique connection and he will always come back to Lisa when she is in need. In the books, Diablo is a bay school horse at Pine Hollow that Carole rides in the third book while Delilah is resting during her pregnancy with Samson.

=== Storm ===
A badly damaged and abused black Thoroughbred gelding that Lisa chooses to be Pine Hollow's first foster horse. Storm likes carrots and is worse with men. He was originally going to be put down until Lisa talked Red into making him Pine Hollow's foster horse. Storm loves Lisa and Mr. Roth equally. Red did not believe in Storm until Mrs. Reg had a talk with him. Storm is eventually adopted by Mr. Roth in "Foster Horse Part 3".

=== Windsong ===
A magnificent chestnut thoroughbred racehorse who is allergic to natural remedies. Windsong temporarily belongs to Veronica until they have no choice but to sell him when Mr. DiAngelo makes some bad investments. Windsong could not compete in The Bridgemont Cup after he went into anaphylaxis because of Ethan Lowell Jr. In the books, Windsong's name is Go For the Blue "Danny" and he is a grey thoroughbred that Veronica gets for Christmas.

=== Midnight ===
A thoroughbred jet black gelding. A temperamental and abused horse that constantly plays up on Desi. He belongs to Desi until Episode 9. When Desi's father learns of his true nature, he plans to put Midnight down. Simon and Midnight form a special bond. He belongs to Simon as of "One Step Forward".

=== Jellybean ===
A grey speckled Andalusian mare. She is one of the most gorgeous horses in the stables. Desi's father bought her to replace Midnight. Jellybean is one of the most expensive and majestic horses at Pine Hollow. She belongs to Desi as of Episode 12. Simon comes up with Jellybean's name in "Itchy" and Desi likes it and agrees to call her Jellybean much to the annoyance of Veronica who wanted Desi to name her Adagio. Jellybean has several markings on her butt due to being registered.

=== Chili ===
Murray's liver chestnut Australian Quarter Horse. Chili is a mountain horse, and he is great on the rough trails. In Season 3 Stevie will often ride Chili. Murray let Stevie ride Chili when she needs to get back and help the Saddle Club.

=== Danville Duchess ===
Danville Duchess is a bay Thoroughbred racehorse owned by Gus. He brings her to Pine Hollow to calm her before a major race. During her stay she forms a close bond with Trouble, a miniature donkey.

=== Trouble ===
A young Miniature Mediterranean donkey introduced in "Back In The Saddle". Adopted by Melanie and Jess, this mischievous little donkey is a favorite at Pine Hollow with his cheeky personality and many hidden talents. Trouble is poisoned in "Lisa's Choice Part 2" because of Veronica. It is later revealed that Trouble is a Castilian grey.

=== Angel ===
Angel is a mischief maker. In Season 2, he runs away with Melanie and Ashley. Luckily Red rescues them on Garnet.

== See also ==
- List of fictional horses
