= List of fictional horses =

This is a list of named equine fictional characters. This list includes horses, ponies, donkeys, mules, and zebras, but excludes real horses (see List of historical horses), horses in mythology and folklore, and fantasy creatures such as centaurs, unicorns, and winged horses.

== Literature ==
- Acorn, Davy's horse in the Chaos Walking series by Patrick Ness
- Arroch, ridden into battle by Húrin in The Children of Húrin by J.R.R Tolkien
- Artax, Atreyu's horse in Michael Ende's The Neverending Story
- Asfaloth, Glorfindel's horse in The Lord of the Rings by J.R.R Tolkien
- Athansor, ridden by Peter Lake in Mark Helprin's A Winter's Tale
- Binky, ridden by Death in Terry Pratchett's Discworld novels
- Black Beauty, from Black Beauty by Anna Sewell
- Black Boy and Rapide, Jill Crewe's ponies from the series by Ruby Ferguson
- Blaze, from a series of children's books by Clarence William Anderson, beginning with Billy and Blaze (1936)
- Boxer, Mollie, and Clover, from Animal Farm by George Orwell
- Cloud, the pony owned by Veralidaine Sarrasri, and other ponies, in The Immortals quartet by Tamora Pierce
- Condor, the mount of Green Rider Karigan G'ladheon in Kristen Britain's Green Rider series
- Destrier, Caspian's horse in Prince Caspian: The Return to Narnia.
- Dilu, the mount of Chinese warlord Liu Bei in the Romance of the Three Kingdoms, attributed to Luo Guanzhong
- Flame, from The Black Stallion series
- Flicka, from My Friend Flicka by Mary O'Hara
- Florian, from Felix Salten's novel Florian: The Emperor's Stallion
- Gabilan, from John Steinbeck's novel The Red Pony
- Ginger, from Black Beauty by Anna Sewell
- Goblin, from Johnny Tremaine by Esther Forbes
- Gunpowder, Ichabod Crane's horse from The Legend of Sleepy Hollow by Washington Irving
- Hatatitla, Old Shatterhand's horse in Karl May's Winnetou
- Hwin, from The Horse and His Boy by C. S. Lewis
- Jim, cab-horse from Dorothy and the Wizard in Oz by L. Frank Baum
- Joey, from War Horse by Michael Morpurgo
- Kholstomer, from the story of the same name by Leo Tolstoy
- Lukas, in the Emil i Lönneberga series by Astrid Lindgren
- Merrylegs, from Black Beauty by Anna Sewell
- Miramis, with golden mane and hooves, from Astrid Lindgren's book Mio, My Son
- Mortis, Death's steed and companion in the Incarnations of Immortality series by Piers Anthony who first appears in the book On A Pale Horse
- Napoleon, from The Black Stallion
- Peachblossom, the horse owned by Keladry in the Protector of the Small quartet by Tamora Pierce
- The Pie, from National Velvet by Enid Bagnold
- Pilgrim from The Horse Whisperer by Nicholas Evans and the film based on it
- Rih, Kara Ben Nemsi's horse in Karl May's tales of the Orient
- Rocinante, from Don Quixote by Miguel de Cervantes; also the name of fictional horses in several other books and movies
- Shadowfax, the horse ridden by Gandalf the White in J.R.R. Tolkien's The Lord of the Rings
- Sham from King of the Wind by Marguerite Henry
- Silver Blaze, from the Sherlock Holmes story The Adventure of Silver Blaze by Arthur Conan Doyle
- Smoky, from Smoky the Cow Horse, written and illustrated by Will James
- Snowmane, the horse of King Théoden which falls on and mortally wounds him during battle in The Lord of the Rings by J.R.R Tolkien
- Talat, Aerin's horse in The Hero and the Crown by Robin McKinley
- Thowra, a creamy-silver stallion, the main character in Silver Brumby, by Elyne Mitchell
- Thunderhead, son of Flicka in the book by Mary O'Hara
- Tug, Will's trained small horse/pony in the Ranger's Apprentice series by John Flanagan
- Whinney from the Earth's Children series by Jean M. Auel, first appearing in the book The Valley of Horses.
- Windfola, who carries Éowyn in the charge of the Rohirrim on the Pelennor Fields in The Lord of the Rings by J.R.R Tolkien

== Film ==
- Arizona Pie, Sarah Brown's horse from International Velvet
- Artax, Atreyu's horse in film The Neverending Story
- Bad Horse, from Dr. Horrible's Sing-Along Blog
- Broadway Bill, from the 1934 film Broadway Bill, and its 1950 remake, Riding High, starring Bing Crosby
- Butch, a stallion residing on the Durango Ranch in Dr. Dolittle 3
- Checkers, from Moondance Alexander
- Cisco, John Dunbar's buckskin gelding from Dances with Wolves
- Don, talking horse from Hot to Trot
- Flash, from Flash
- Flicka, from Flicka, based on the book My Friend Flicka
- Ginger, from Black Beauty
- Gulliver, from The Horse Whisperer
- Gypsy, Meggie MacWade's horse, which undertakes a journey to be reunited with her in Gypsy Colt
- Hidalgo, from Hidalgo (2004)
- Joey, from the movie War Horse
- Napoleon, Snoe's gray cart horse and The Black's stable mate in the film The Black Stallion
- Pepper, from Two Bits & Pepper (1995)
- Pie, Velvet Brown's horse from National Velvet
- Pilgrim, from The Horse Whisperer
- Shetan, from The Young Black Stallion film based on Walter Farley's book.
- Sylvester, from Sylvester (1985)
- Taff/Bo, the main horse character in Disney's Ride a Wild Pony
- The Black, from The Black Stallion and The Black Stallion Returns, based on Walter Farley's books
- Tír na nÓg from Into the West
- Tolo, gelding from The Long Shot
- Two Bits, from Two Bits & Pepper (1995)

== Television ==
- Bandit, buckskin from Caitlin's Way
- Blue Jeans, Miley Stewart's horse in Hannah Montana
- Champion, Gene Autry's horse and the eponymous hero of a 1950s television series
- Chestnut, from the TV series 2 Broke Girls
- Fury, a black stallion of the 1950s TV series Fury
- Mister Ed, eponymous horse of the CBS series, 1961–1966
- Meindert het Paard, a horse who is a character in the Dutch TV children's puppet series De Fabeltjeskrant (called Milord the Horse in the British version)
- Pie-O-My, Ralph Cifaretto's horse from Episodes 44 and 48 of Season 4 of The Sopranos
- Polka-Dotted Horse, Ludicrous Lion's horse from H.R. Pufnstuf
- Saddle Club horses from The Saddle Club
- Silver, the Lone Ranger's horse
- The Black in Adventures of the Black Stallion
- Tornado, also occasionally "Toronado", Zorro's black horse
- Wildfire, from ABC Family's Wildfire

== Animation ==
- Alípio, from puppet series Cocoricó
- Altivo, Cortez's warhorse from DreamWorks' The Road to El Dorado
- Amadeus, Tina's Stallion in Bibi and Tina
- Angus, horse of Merida in Disney's Brave
- Apple Bloom, in My Little Pony: Friendship Is Magic
- Applejack, in My Little Pony: Friendship Is Magic
- BoJack Horseman, the titular alcoholic celebrity horse in BoJack Horseman
- Brian Winddancer, Former actor and current Mayor of Zootopia in Zootopia 2
- Buck, the sheriff's horse from Home on the Range
- Bullseye, Woody's horse in Toy Story franchise
- Captain, the authoritative farm horse in Disney's 101 Dalmatians
- Chet, from The Littlest Pet Shop
- Cyril Proudbottom, Toad's helpful but clumsy horse friend in Disney's The Adventures of Ichabod and Mr. Toad
- Frou-Frou, from The Aristocats
- Fuun Saiki, from Mobile Fighter G Gundam
- Horace Horsecollar by Walt Disney Animation Studios
- Horse, Dudley Do-Right's horse in The Rocky and Bullwinkle Show
- Horse, from Centaurworld
- Ico, from Ico, el Caballito valiente
- James Baxter, from Adventure Time
- Khan, the Fa family's horse from Disney's Mulan
- Kokuoh, Raoh's horse from Fist of the North Star
- Maggie, in Gallopin' Gals
- Major, from Cinderella
- Mane Attraction, anthropomorphic horse from the animated film GOAT
- Marvin, titular character of Marvin the Tap-Dancing Horse
- Maximus, horse featured in the animated film Tangled
- Mr. Horse from Ren and Stimpy
- Noble Heart Horse, in Care Bears Movie II: A New Generation
- Phillipe, Belle's and her father's horse from Disney's Beauty and the Beast
- Pinkie Pie, in My Little Pony: Friendship Is Magic
- Pokey, the pony from The Gumby Show
- Ponycorn, from Bomberman B-Daman Bakugaiden
- Ponygon and Kardio from Zatch Bell!
- Quick Draw McGraw, of Hanna-Barbera's cartoon series
- Rain, the paint mare from Spirit: Stallion of the Cimarron
- Sabrina, Bibi's mare in Bibi and Tina
- Sabure, in Tari Tari
- Spirit from She-Ra
- Spirit, the stallion from Spirit: Stallion of the Cimarron
- Thirty/Thirty, the Equistroid Deputy of Marshal BraveStarr
- Thowra, the silver brumby in The Silver Brumby cartoon series
- Tybalt, the talking horse in Pinocchio: A True Story

== Comics ==
- Alsan, from Red River
- Arabesque, Blutch's horse in Les Tuniques Bleues, whom he has trained to fall down during battle so he can act as if he is wounded and thus survive the battles.
- Aragorn, the name of several winged horses in Marvel Comics
- Banshee, the horse of Phantom Rider from Marvel Comics
- Basashi, from K -Memory of Red- and K -Days of Blue-
- Billy Boy, in Bamse by Rune Andréasson
- Blue Horse and Brown Horse, two programmers from the web comic horse++
- Butter Rum, Firestar's horse that dies in a stable fire secretly set by Emma Frost.
- Comet, Supergirl's pet horse
- Godasse, horse of the French soldier Godaille in the comics series Godaille et Godasse by Jacques Sandron.
- Het Gouden Paard, a horse whose skin is gold. Appears in the Suske en Wiske story Het Gouden Paard.
- Hero, the fastest horse in the world; owned by The Phantom.
- Hirnu the pony, the protagonist of Hirnu, a Finnish comic strip by Joonas.
- Hortense, Scrooge McDuck's horse in The Life and Times of Scrooge McDuck by Don Rosa
- Jolly Jumper, Lucky Luke's horse and friend in Lucky Luke.
- Kipper, the pony of Penelope in Penelope by Norman Thelwell.
- Little Thunder, the personal pony of Yakari
- Lucy, pet horse and special friend to Danae in Wiley Miller's Non Sequitur
- Midori no Makibaō
- Nightmare, from Casper the Friendly Ghost.
- Rik Drie ("Rik Three"). A horse of Nero in the story "Het Geheim van Bakkendoen" ("The Secret of Bakkendoen"). It turns invisible due to a serum. Nero named him "Rik Three", because "he is even greater than Rik One and Rik Two". Cyclist champions Rik Van Steenbergen and Rik Van Looy were popularly nicknamed "Rik One" and "Rik Two", because they were active around the same time.
- Isuzu Sohma, also known as Rin, who is cursed to take the form of a horse, from Fruits Basket.
- Het Rijmende Paard ("The Rhyming Horse"). He is the horse of Saint Martin of Tours on Antoon van Dyck's famous painting. In the Suske en Wiske album "Het Rijmende Paard", he is brought alive and escapes, causing the protagonists to start a search for him.
- Ruby, the horse of cowboy Jerry Spring.
- Slow Dancer, fictional Appaloosa of Johnny Joestar from Steel Ball Run
- Steve, the carthorse in Roland Davies' comic strip Come On, Steve.
- Spark Plug. He is the horse of Barney Google.
- Thunder. He is the horse of Red Ryder.

== Song ==
- Becky, the mule from Carl Perkins' Movie Magg.
- Bottle of Smoke, the eponymous horse in the song by The Pogues
- Chestnut Mare, the eponymous horse in the song by The Byrds
- Feitlebaum, the racehorse who always comes up from behind to finish first in songs by Doodles Weaver, performed with Spike Jones and his City Slickers
- Galway Bay, the 'coal-black mare with a white starred chest' in the song "The Galway Farmer" by Steve Knightly of Show of Hands
- Henry the Horse, the waltzing horse from The Beatles' "Being for the Benefit of Mr. Kite!"; based on a real horse called Zanthus, from Pablo Fanque's Circus Royal
- The Horse With No Name, the horse in the eponymous song by America
- Leroy, the cowboy's horse in "Save a Horse (Ride a Cowboy)" by Big & Rich
- Lisette, crazed horse in the song "Run Lisette" by Glass Hammer
- Mac, from Mason Proffit's "Two Hangmen"
- Mighty Little from Frank Zappa's "Montana"
- Molly O'Brian and Tenbrooks, who raced in the song "The Ballad of Molly and Tenbrooks" written by Bill Monroe
- The Old Gray Mare, the horse in the eponymous song
- Paul Revere, the horse from the song of the same name, Paul Revere, by the Beastie Boys
- Een paard in de gang, a horse which somehow ended up in neighbour Jansen's hallway. From the eponymous song by comedian André van Duin.
- Pinto the wonder horse from the song by Tom T. Hall.
- Seven Horses in the Sky, seven horses who appeared in the sky, according to the 1969 eponymous hit song by The Pebbles.
- Sorrow, the name of the carnie's horse in the Nick Cave & The Bad Seeds song "The Carnie"
- Stewball, from the eponymous song by Peter, Paul and Mary
- The Strawberry Roan, an unrideable horse in the eponymous song performed by Marty Robbins, Chris LeDoux, and others
- The Tennessee Stud, the horse in the eponymous song written by Jimmy Driftwood and later covered by Doc Watson and Johnny Cash.
- Trigger, the horse who pulled the fastest milkcart in the West in Benny Hill's Ernie (The Fastest Milkman in the West).
- Wildfire, the horse in the eponymous song by Michael Martin Murphey

== Video games ==
- Agro, the horse of Wander, and Phaedra, the 4th Colossus in Shadow of the Colossus
- Despair, Horse of Death in Darksiders II
- D-Horse, an Andalusian horse who appears in Metal Gear Solid 5: The Phantom Pain as the steed of Venom Snake.
- Epona, the horse Link usually rides in The Legend of Zelda franchise

== Toys ==
- Bella Sara — trading card and online game (2007–2013)
- Breyer horses — model horses
- Horseland — online community and browser game (1994–2019)
- My Little Pony — a toy line

== See also ==
- List of historical horses
- List of horses in mythology and folklore
- List of fictional ungulates
- List of fictional horse trainers
