= MacWilliams =

MacWilliams and MacWilliam are English-language surnames. They are derived from the Gaelic Mac Uilleim, a patronymic form of a Gaelicized form of the English William. The final -s in MacWilliams is a redundant English patronymical suffix.

- Dave MacWilliams (born 1957), American soccer player
- Jessie MacWilliams (1917–1990), English mathematician
- Keenan MacWilliam (born 1989), Canadian actress
- Lyle MacWilliam (born 1949), Canadian congressman
- Mike MacWilliam (born 1967), Canadian ice hockey player
