= List of The Saddle Club episodes =

The following is a complete episode list for the Australian children's series The Saddle Club, which began airing on ABC on 30 April 2001 and ended on 10 April 2009. The series revolves around the experiences of three best friends Carole Hanson, Stevie Lake, and Lisa Atwood who form The Saddle Club after recognizing their equal passions for horse riding and the horses themselves. However, their friendship is detested by fellow riders Veronica diAngelo and Kristi Cavanaugh. The Saddle Club's friendship is admired by Megan, Sam and, in Series 3, new students Desi and Simon. The girl's friendship is envied by Ashley, Melanie and, in Series 3, Jess.

== Series overview ==
Series	Episodes	Originally released	
Series	Episodes	First released	Last released
1	26	30 April 2001	4 June 2001
2	26	28 April 2003	2 June 2003
3	26	7 September 2008	10 April 2009

== Episodes ==
=== Series 1 (2001) ===
No. overall	No. in season	Title	Original release date	Prod. code
1	1	"The Saddle Club"	30 April 2001	101
At her first day at Pine Hallow, Lisa manages to vex Carole and Stevie and is befriended by Veronica DiAngelo. After Lisa's cell phone accidentally goes off during the lesson, Veronica plans to put her pager under Comanche's saddle and put him and Stevie in danger. Lisa ruins Veronica's plan, and teams up with Carole to save Stevie and Comanche. Veronica hates Lisa for telling Carole about her plan to hurt Stevie and Comanche. At the end of the episode, Carole, Stevie, and Lisa form The Saddle Club.
2	2	"Work Horses"	1 May 2001	102
David McLeod plans to put down his horse Prancer. Since Max refuses to buy her, the Saddle Club sneak out at night, kidnap Prancer and hide her in a disused barn. They call the local vet Judy to help Prancer through her injuries and a bout of colic, and Stevie gives up the money she has been saving to go camping to pay for Prancer's medication. David McLeod is furious when he learns what has happened, but Max offers to buy Prancer from him as a new school horse. Note: Gerard Kennedy guest stars in this episode as David McLeod. Gerard would later return to The Saddle Club as Jess's grandfather Orlando Cooper in series 3.
3	3	"Trail Ride Part 1"	2 May 2001	103
Veronica likes Phil Marsten but he likes Stevie. Veronica puts herself and Cobalt in danger when she plans to pretend to be lost, and winds up unconscious on the trail after falling off of Cobalt.
4	4	"Trail Ride Part 2"	3 May 2001	104
Cobalt returns to the camp site without Veronica. Max leaves to look for her and tells everyone to stay at camp. The Saddle Club and Phil ignore this rule and put themselves and their horses in danger.
5	5	"Horse Shy"	4 May 2001	105
Carole and Stevie try to teach Lisa how to canter after Veronica and Kristi tease her. Carole and Stevie fall and end up stuck on the edge of a cliff. Lisa has to ride back to Pine Hollow and get help before it's too late.
6	6	"Mystery Weekend"	7 May 2001	106
Max announces a mystery weekend to find Nickel, Pine Hollow's favorite pony, as a game. After breaking curfew and being accused of stealing Veronica's tack, Max disqualifies The Saddle Club. The girls disobey Max in order to prove that they're innocent. They find out that the thief is actually Phil's friend Greg, who is trying to get his father's attention. Veronica and Kristi win the Mystery weekend, until the others spot that Veronica has stolen clues sticking out of her jacket pocket. Max disqualifies them for cheating and the winner's trophy goes to The Saddle Club instead.
7	7	"School Horse"	8 May 2001	107
Max decides to sell Prancer when she puts Ashley and Dime in danger. Max changes his mind and decides to train Prancer for his advanced jumping class instead of selling her after she saves The Saddle Club when Lisa is bitten by an eastern brown snake. Note: Kim Krejus guest stars as Mrs. Chambers.
8	8	"Star Quality"	9 May 2001	108
The Saddle Club are starstruck when a movie crew decide to use Pine Hollow as a movie location for "The Lone Rider", and they get to meet movie star Skye Ransom. However, they learn that Skye has lied about being able to ride, and has to learn or else he'll be fired from "The Lone Rider". The Saddle Club try to teach him to jump. They audition for the film, with the part going to Lisa's little sister Melanie. Veronica bullies her way into getting a part, only to completely ruin her scene and be kicked off the set. Having had no success with teaching him, Stevie poses as Skye Ransom to perform his big stunt. Meanwhile, Max meets Deborah Hale. Note: Jeremy Hopkins guest stars as Skye Ransom. The creator of the show, Bonnie Bryant also makes a guest appearance in the episode.
9	9	"Herdbound"	10 May 2001	109
Mrs. Atwood decides to enroll Lisa at Wentworth Academy the local boarding school when her grades slip due to focusing on riding instead of school and other responsibilities. Meanwhile, Veronica gets jealous when Max says that Carole was born to ride Cobalt and when Mrs. diAngelo says that Carole looks like a natural on Cobalt. Veronica refuses to let Carole ride Cobalt as she wants to ride and take care of Cobalt. The Saddle Club convince Mrs. Atwood to let Lisa stay at Pine Hollow. Lisa is of course grounded until her grades improve. Veronica then lets Carole ride and take care of Cobalt. Melanie wants to learn to ride after seeing how good her big sister is.
10	10	"Greener Pastures Part 1"	11 May 2001	110
Carole becomes Dr. Judy's assistant after her work-study is approved, but has trouble adapting to the daily routine of a vet, and living up to her mother's legacy. She shocks her boss by quitting her work study. Max continually warns Veronica about her dangerous riding. Sam challenges Veronica to a jump-off, with devastating consequences; Veronica causes Cobalt to break his right foreleg, resulting in him being euthanized.
11	11	"Greener Pastures Part 2"	14 May 2001	111
Because of Cobalt's death Carole temporarily quits riding at Pine Hollow. Stevie and Lisa trick Carole into thinking that Veronica wants to buy Starlight when Carole decides to sell him, since she doesn't want to ride ever again. Carole associates Cobalt's death with Dr. Hanson's death. With Colonel Hanson's help, Carole comes to terms with both her mother and Cobalt's deaths, and is overjoyed as she learns that Delilah is pregnant with Cobalt's foal. Colonel Hanson informs Carole that her mom wouldn't have wanted her to quit riding or sell Starlight. Carole starts riding at Pine Hollow again, keeps Starlight, and becomes Dr. Judy's assistant again so she can help her during Delilah's pregnancy with Samson.
12	12	"Jumping to Conclusions"	15 May 2001	112
Lisa's assignment to Prancer makes Veronica mad and she has to ride Patch due to Cobalt's death. When Prancer suddenly acts sluggish, Veronica convinces Max to let her ride Prancer instead of Lisa, and then slips her extra oats to make her more energetic. Phil discovers that Prancer has been poisoned after eating Oleander, and Max suspends Veronica from lessons until further notice after learning about the oat trick because the horses had been put on a carefully planned feeding schedule to make sure the feed isn't what was making Prancer sick, and the riders had specifically been told not to give the horses anything extra for that reason.
13	13	"Set Up"	16 May 2001	113
The girls overhear Max talking to Deborah, and become convinced that she wants him to sell Pine Hollow. Red's best friend Jake tries to fix things around the yard, but messes things up. Veronica's parents get her a horse named Garnet, but she is upset that she hadn't been consulted in the decision, and demands that her parents sell her back. Christi manages to convince Veronica to accept Garnet. The Saddle Club see how upset Max is about his relationship with Deborah souring, and conspire to get the couple back together with a romantic picnic.
14	14	"Over the Bit"	17 May 2001	123
Red's cousin, Liam, lies to everyone. Phil makes his doubts known to Carole and Stevie, but they don't believe him. Liam goes into Max's office and breaks his favorite trophy, but blames Phil. Red receives a phone call from Liam's mother and finds out that he has run away from home. He shouts at Liam in front of the other riders. Liam tries to leave Pine Hollow before his parents arrive, but comes across Lisa, who suddenly has appendicitis. He goes back to the yard to try and get help but nobody believes him. With no other options, he helps lead Lisa back to Pine Hollow on Prancer, saving her and redeeming himself. Phil is stunned when Stevie apologises for doubting him.
15	15	"Gift Horse"	18 May 2001	115
The birth of Delilah and Cobalt's foal Samson helps The Saddle Club solve their differences. Stevie's other best friend Tina comes back to Willow Creek for her yearly visit and informs Stevie that she stopped riding after her family moved to the city. Lisa and Veronica audition for the role of Gwendolyn Fairfax in their school's production of The Importance of Being Earnest.
16	16	"Flying Change"	21 May 2001	116
Veronica ignores Garnet and The Saddle Club think that she'll end up like Cobalt. The girls switch Garnet with Mrs. Marsten's horse Nomad. The Saddle Club put Veronica and Nomad in danger after their plan goes wrong. Max suspends The Saddle Club from Pine Hollow for one week and tells Veronica to start taking care of Garnet more. Melanie tries to hand feed Samson because she doesn't want Dr. Judy to put a tube down his throat due to Delilah being sick.
17	17	"Found Horse Part 1"	22 May 2001	118
Stevie rescues a neglected mare, names her Belle after the horse in the story and plans to keep her. Kristi develops a crush on John Brightstar a boy helping with the Western Clinic. Deborah prints her newspaper article about Stevie finding Belle on the front page. Belle's rightful owner Chelsea Owens sees the picture of Stevie and Belle on the newspaper and knows where to find her missing horse. Note: Nick Russell guest stars as John Brightstar for two episodes.
18	18	"Found Horse Part 2"	23 May 2001	119
Chelsea Owens travels to Pine Hollow to take Belle home. Stevie has to do the right thing and return Belle to Chelsea. Stevie selfishly refuses to give Belle back to Chelsea. Max explains that Chelsea has every right to take Belle with her.
19	19	"Jump Off"	24 May 2001	114
Carole is jealous of Andrea Barry's riding skills.
20	20	"Across The Board"	25 May 2001	120
Veronica and carole make a bet. The loser has to leave Pine Hollow forever.
21	21	"Track Record"	28 May 2001	121
Jake accidentally forgets to bring the hay in before it rains and it sets the barn on fire. Red is then blamed for the fire and quits his job at Pine Hollow. In the end Jake does the right thing and quits his job and Red gets an apology from Max.
22	22	"First Refusal"	29 May 2001	122
Veronica has to stay at Lisa's house until her parents get back from vacation because Kristi has strep throat. While there she reads Lisa's diary and causes disturbances in The Saddle Club. Meanwhile, The Saddle Club teach Deborah how to ride so that she can ask Max to marry her.
23	23	"Horse Play"	30 May 2001	117
The girls see a real ghost diring 'Fright Night".
24	24	"High Horse"	31 May 2001	124
Kristi discovers a natural talent for horse whispering while working with Comanche at a clinic that Mrs. Reg is hosting. After her performance she is asked to be on "Kids Sports Live". Kristi lets being a horse whisperer go to her head and is humiliated on TV with Veronica when things don't go right. The Saddle Club see how bad Kristi is doing so they go to save her because they don't want Pine Hollow to look bad, too. Max is jealous of the show's director Jerry who happens to be Deborah's ex-boyfriend.
25	25	"Bridle Path Part 1"	1 June 2001	125
Lisa puts herself and Prancer in danger when she decides to try a jump that's too hard for her after she fell off Prancer and hit her head, knocking her unconscious. Max and Deborah cancel their wedding after a fall from Prancer leaves Lisa injured with a concussion.
26	26	"Bridle Path Part 2"	4 June 2001	126
Carole and Stevie try to awaken Lisa. The only way to get their best friend to wake up is when Prancer visits her and whinnies at the hospital window. Stevie and Phil admit that they like each other and share a kiss.

=== Series 2 (2003) ===
No. overall	No. in season	Title	Original release date	Prod. code
27	1	"A Horse of A Different Colour Part 1"	28 April 2003	201
When Carole returns home from vacation to find Pine Hollow deserted she believes that her friends have forgotten her birthday. A horse dealer named Hugo arrives from France at Pine Hollow. A sneaky thief is operating at the stables and Veronica thinks it may be Scooter. Note: Song at the end of Episodes is "Hello World" unless noted otherwise.
28	2	"A Horse of A Different Colour Part 2"	29 April 2003	202
Hugo turns out to be a fake horse dealer, and someone much more dangerous than they expected. The Saddle Club must find the real Hugo before Dorotee arrives. Song at the end: "Together We Are"
29	3	"Show Ponies Part 1"	30 April 2003	203
The Saddle Club's enthusiasm for lessons from Dorotee quickly turn to disappointment. The stables is astonished to hear Deborah is taking over while Mrs. Reg is on a cruise for two that her sister won.
30	4	"Show Ponies Part 2"	1 May 2003	204
Veronica uses her influence to become a member of The Saddle Club, but the first gig Scooter gets the group is not what they expected. She quits the band when she finds out the gig is only at JB's. Song at the end: "Wonderland"
31	5	"The Ride of His Life"	2 May 2003	205
There's been a breakout of the equine virus and everyone thinks that Hugo might be carrying it. The Saddle Club has to save Comanche's life when it's believed that he has the equine virus and must be put down. It turns out that all he has is colic. His life is spared.
32	6	"Love Is In the Air"	5 May 2003	206
Stevie and Phil's first date turns into a disaster when Stevie falls into manure. Red coaxes Dorotée into facing her fears and jumping off a cliff. Belle and Teddy fall in love with each other. Carole's unhappiness with her father's seduction of Whitney grows worse when Colonel Hanson proposes that Whitney's son, Murray, come to Pine Hollow. Note: Troy Lovett plays Murray Richards for two episodes. He would later be cast as Jack O'Neal for series 3 of The Saddle Club.
33	7	"Horsenapped"	6 May 2003	207
When Garnet is kidnapped, Carole sets out to bring her back before Veronica finds out. Meanwhile, Murray is driving Carole mad, both at home and at Pine Hollow. Note: Lisa was in this episode for a short amount of time. She is not seen again until the end of the episode when Dorotée tells everyone that she and Hugo have been invited to try out for the Paris Olympic Equestrian Team.
34	8	"Aurevoir Dorothée"	7 May 2003	208
Both Dorothée and Max are faced with important decisions. The stables are divided about whether Dorothée should pursue her love with Red or her career as a show jumper. Meanwhile, Kristi wants Red to stay at Pine Hollow to tell him how she feels. But in the end, the decision might lie with in Hugo.
35	9	"The Home Straight"	8 May 2003	209
When Pepper gets too old, The Saddle Club is faced with the difficult task of finding a way for an old man and an old horse to enjoy a useful old age. Max's cousin, Drew takes over the stables while Max is away in France.
36	10	"Running Free Part 1"	9 May 2003	210
The Saddle Club befriend Raffael and his mother, both circus folk, who arrive in Willow Creek with Raffael's beautiful horse, Diablo. Then Raffael is accused of horse-theft by a local farmer. Melanie and Ashley set up a Pine Hollow news sheet complete with gossip column. Lisa begins to like Raffael. Diablo comes up missing and the girls and Raffael set out to find him. Note: Damien Bodie guest stars as Raffael for two episodes.
37	11	"Running Free Part 2"	12 May 2003	211
Raffael is forced to sell Diablo when his family's life savings are stolen by Nevel. Mrs. Atwood buys Diablo for Lisa so that Raffael will leave. Lisa is especially saddened by Raffael's departure, but learns that he'll be working at Sweet Water. Lisa does the right thing and sets Diablo free to roam in the wild.
38	12	"Race Against Time"	13 May 2003	212
When the gangs horses get sick except for Teddy Veronica sets out to prove that Phil is poisoning their horses.
39	13	"Stevie's Bad Day"	14 May 2003	213
Stevie gets her first pimple. On the day of Pine Hollow's rally Stevie puts herself and Belle in danger when she rides without her helmet and gets hurt. Note: Heli Simpson doesn't appear in this episode.
40	14	"Fillies vs. Colts"	15 May 2003	214
Stevie challenges the boys to a Survivor-style camp off to determine who is the better gender, while Melanie and Ashley have their own gender battle with a new rider named Nick. Note: Heli Simpson doesn't appear in this episode.
41	15	"Blind Faith"	16 May 2003	215
When visually impaired students visit Pine Hollow, The Saddle Club helps a young blind girl named Jenna conquer her fear of horses. Note: Heli Simpson doesn't appear in this episode.
42	16	"Join Up"	19 May 2003	216
A dance has all of Pine Hollow seeking a date, and Kristi schemes to snare Red as her partner with Veronica's help. Carole's attempts at matchmaking end in disaster when she makes over a David for Lisa and her efforts almost split up The Saddle Club when she actually falls in love with him. Song at the end: "Perfect Boy"
43	17	"Tender Foot"	20 May 2003	217
Carole, Stevie, and Lisa are worried when Belle comes down with a mysterious illness that even the new young vet can't diagnose. Red is left to manage Pine Hollow on his own because Drew injures his shoulder and has to go to his chiropractor. With everyone busy Melanie and Ashley set out to ride an uncontrollable horse named Angel, who seems to have a problem of running off with her riders. Dr. Whiteside (played by Chris Hemsworth) saves Belle's life when he removes the splinter painted with lead paint from her leg. Scooter confesses his love for Veronica. Veronica thinks he is lying and storms out of the lounge.
44	18	"Bloodlines"	21 May 2003	218
The Saddle Club befriend a young painter named Chelsea Smith, who turns out to be Kristi’s long-lost big sister. Veronica tries to convince Kristi that Chelsea is just trying to scam her, so she can keep Kristi to herself. Meanwhile, Melanie and Ashley are working on a family tree for a school project, and upset Lisa with an embarrassing picture.
45	19	"Foster Horse Part 1"	22 May 2003	219
Lisa and Red take on the rehabilitation of a gelding named Storm that was badly abused. Carole and Stevie discover that Pine Hollow is broke.
46	20	"Foster Horse Part 2"	23 May 2003	220
Lisa's upset when Red gives up on Storm and wants to return the horse to the shelter to be put down. Pine Hollow's money problems are worse than the girls thought. Song at the end: "Storm"
47	21	"Foster Horse Part 3"	26 May 2003	221
Lisa gains Storm's trust, but his ultimate test is still to come. Mrs. Reg talks Red into giving Storm another chance.
48	22	"High Stakes Part 1"	27 May 2003	222
Carole assists a famous trainer with Veronica's promising young racehorse Windsong.
49	23	"High Stakes Part 2"	28 May 2003	223
Carole blames herself for the erratic performance of Windsong. Veronica is distressed when her father informs her that he made some bad investments and they can't afford to keep Windsong. Mr. diAngelo tells Veronica that if they can sell Windsong for tidy profit provided that he wins The Bridgemont Cup they'll be all right until the stock market rides again. Windsong's not able to race due to an allergic reaction to herbal remedies.
50	24	"Odd Girl Out"	29 May 2003	224
The riders have to ride in pairs in the Cross Country Challenge and the two odd girls, Carole and Veronica, pair up. A new girl, Tracey, causes tension between Melanie and Ashley.
51	25	"Horse's Keeper"	30 May 2003	225
When Veronica is forced to work under the supervision of Stevie at the stables to pay for Garnet's board, she decides to sell Garnet. Once the sale is made, Veronica bitterly regrets her decision and The Saddle Club feel sorry for her. They convince Garnet's new owner to sell her back to Veronica. Veronica is happy to have Garnet back and promises to look after her.
52	26	"Finishing Strongly"	2 June 2003	226
The bank is foreclosing on Pine Hollow, and The Saddle Club arranges a rummage sale to help the Regnerys, with surprises. In the end, thanks to Veronica finding a stamp that belonged to Max's great grandfather that's worth a lot of money, Pine Hollow is saved. Note: This is the last series to star the original cast members.

=== Series 3 (2008–09) ===
No. overall	No. in season	Title	Original release date	Prod. code
53	1	"Back In the Saddle"	15 September 2008	301
Veronica puts herself and Garnet in danger when she uses a shortcut to cheat when she challenges The Saddle Club to a race, which leads her to losing Garnet and entering into an unknown forest. Veronica hears rustling through the trees when she sees a ghost in between the trees and she screams and turns around to run but Veronica looks down and her foot is stuck in between two boulders Veronica struggles to get her foot free. A woman appears behind Veronica the lady reaches down frees Veronica's foot Veronica runs away running into Carole and returns to The Saddle Club. Song at the end: "These Girls", as well as a card reading; "In Memory of Jessie Jacobs" at the end. Note: This is the first series to star the new cast.
54	2	"Moving On Part 1"	16 September 2008	302
When her father is deployed overseas, Carole has to say goodbye to Pine Hollow and Starlight. It looks as though this could be the end of The Saddle Club. Song at the end: "Hello World"
55	3	"Moving On Part 2"	1 October 2008	303
Devastated at having to leave Pine Hollow, and the idea that Starlight will join her father in the military, Carole runs away with her beloved horse. Lisa and Stevie join their best friend and embark on a radical course of action to keep Carole at Pine Hollow. In the end, Carole and Starlight stay and live with Max and Mrs. Reg as a guest of Pine Hollow. Song at the end: "We Can Do Anything"
56	4	"Don't Give a Hoot"	2 October 2008	304
Something is hurting the horses at night. Everyone thinks it has something to do with the mysterious new student, Desi. In the end, it turns out to be a trapped Barn owl in the stables. Song at the end: "Hello World"
57	5	"Crossing the Line"	23 December 2008	305
A favorite trail near Pine Hollow is closed off by Desi's father, but The Saddle Club are forced to trespass on it when miniature donkey, Trouble lives up to his name. Song at the end: "Why"
58	6	"Facing the Music"	24 December 2008	306
The District Interclub Competition is about to take place at Pine Hollow. Stevie is dared by the boys to rough ride. They are so impressed at her zip, they invite her to be the third rider on their team in the Willow Creek Time Trial. Unfortunately, this clashes with The Saddle Club's Musical Formation event. Song at end: "Horseback Riders"
59	7	"The Dutchess and The Donkey"	25 December 2008	307
When Stevie gets injured after Trouble causes her to fall off of Belle, Carole and Lisa offer to stop riding, out of solidarity. Stevie thinks this is a silly idea, but Veronica makes a bet with Carole and Lisa that they can't go without riding for a week. If Carole and Lisa win the bet they'll get Veronica's new Western saddle. If Veronica wins Carole, Stevie, and Lisa must let her be president of The Saddle Club. A magnificent racehorse called Danville Dutchess is brought to Pine Hollow and forms a bond with Trouble. Veronica tricks Carole and Lisa into riding Dutchess in an effort to cheat and win the bet. Song at end: "Hey Trouble"
60	8	"All That Glitters"	26 December 2008	308
The Saddle Club stumble upon a disused gold mine and hear its history from Jess's grandfather Orlando, an ex-circus strongman. Veronica heaps scorn on the old timer, so The Saddle Club resolves to teach her some manners but things come unstuck. Melanie and Jess put themselves and Trouble in danger when they go looking for gold. It's up to The Saddle Club and Orlando to rescue them. Song at end: "Hello World"
61	9	"One Step Forward"	29 December 2008	309
Having forged a bond with Midnight, Simon cannot stomach the thought of the beautiful horse being put down so he resolves to do something about it, and The Saddle Club are quick to involve themselves in a good cause. Simon puts Midnight in danger after he runs away when they go for a ride and Midnight gets stuck on a cliff. Song at end of the episode: "Storm (Midnight's Song)"
62	10	"Cut to The Quick"	30 December 2008	310
It is the annual trials to set the rankings for the Pine Hollow students and Veronica is looking down the barrel of coming second to Stevie. This prompts Veronica to do something extreme and she puts herself and Garnet in danger. Guest starring: Wendy Hughes Song at the end: "Home"
63	11	"Pioneer Day"	31 December 2008	311
When Stevie finds a championship medallion in Old Sweetwater, she reunites the medal with its reclusive owner Rosemary Cross, who overcomes her tragic past to horse ride again. Meanwhile, Veronica tries to persuade Mrs. Reg by letting her be the leader of the Pioneer Day Parade. Guest starring: Deidre Rubenstein Song at end: "Hello World"
64	12	"Itchy"	1 January 2009	312
Carole develops allergy symptoms and fears that she's allergic to horses. She swears Stevie and Lisa to secrecy, but they worry that the allergy is making Carole an unsafe rider when she puts herself and Starlight in danger. Could this be the end of The Saddle Club? After Lisa tells Mrs. Reg about Carole's allergy in an effort to keep her and Starlight safe a trip to the doctor reveals that Carole is allergic to camels not horses. The saddle pad that Colonel Hanson sent Carole as a present is made from camel hair. Meanwhile, Desi gets a new horse named Jellybean since Midnight was sold to Simon. It appears that Jellybean is a roller. Simon discovers that there was a grass seed under Desi's saddle pad that was making Jellybean roll. Song at end: "Five Bucks An Hour"
65	13	"Lisa’s Choice Part 1"	2 January 2009	313
Out of the blue, Diablo returns to Pine Hollow and Lisa makes him feel welcome, but Belle becomes ill and Stevie becomes convinced that Diablo has come down with a virus from the wild and made Belle sick. Song at end: "Hello World"
66	14	"Lisa’s Choice Part 2"	5 January 2009	314
Pine Hollow is quarantined by a suspected outbreak of equine influenza. Lisa has to bring Diablo in to be euthanized if he is the source of the outbreak. Lisa selfishly refuses to help Max look for Diablo, who has gone missing. This puts Belle and the other horses in danger. Tests reveal that Diablo is healthy and Belle accidentally got poisoned by Veronica, who used an apple-scented hair gel to make Garnet's coat shine. Song at end: "Be Free", Originally by Saddle Girl
67	15	"Seeing is Believing"	6 January 2009	315
A mystery pony appears at Pine Hollow and follows Carole everywhere, which is a good thing since it saves her life. Meanwhile, Desi is throwing a party for her 12th birthday, but with Veronica organizing most of it, things almost don't turn out as expected because of Veronica's standards. The pony's name turns out to be Sky. Sky belongs to a young blind girl named Miranda. Song at end: "Words You Told Me" Note: Matylda Buczko who previously played Dorothée Doutey during Season 2 of The Saddle Club guest stars as Miranda in this episode.
68	16	"Trouble Free"	7 January 2009	316
When Veronica removes Trouble from the stables, she upsets the miniature donkey and Danville Dutchess, who escape on a cross-country adventure to be together. Only Jess and Melanie's detective work can find the donkey, the million dollar racehorse and save Veronica's hide. Song at end: "We Go Together"
69	17	"Outfoxed"	8 January 2009	317
An adventurous mock fox hunt turns dire for Simon the Fox when he puts himself and Midnight in danger because Simon rides into dangerous terrain and is injured. Will the other Pine Hollow students stop bickering and find him in time? Song at end: "Outfoxed"
70	18	"Staying the Distance"	9 January 2009	318
As Lisa continues to improve her jumping skills, giving Carole and Veronica a serious run for top spot, Prancer’s old leg injury flares up after Lisa practices jumping too long. Now Lisa must face a difficult decision. Say goodbye to her steady reliable old horse in favor of a newer more athletic one, or settle for always being in third place. In the end, Prancer recovers and Lisa decides to compete in the Jump Off the next year. Song at end: "Being A Girl"
71	19	"Borrowing Freedom"	1 April 2009	319
When Garnet refuses to make the double oxer jump, Veronica is humiliated and implements cruel measures to make Garnet more obedient. Determined to make it to the regionals, Veronica hires a cruel horse breaker named Curt Bittiker before she realizes it’s her own fear of failure that is really holding Garnet back. Song at end: "My Little Foal"
72	20	"Pedigree"	2 April 2009	320
When Veronica hears Samantha Askew, a young wealthy girl with a link to the royal family, is visiting Pine Hollow, she sets about improving everything and everyone. Little does Veronica know, "Sam" doesn't have pedigree taste, as she befriends Stevie and becomes fond of rough riding. Song at end: "A Question of Style"
73	21	"Brothers and Sisters (Friends and Family)"	3 April 2009	321
After an argument with her sister, Melanie is distraught to hear Lisa wish she didn't exist. Upset, Melanie runs away on her pony and Lisa must venture out with Prancer in order to find her and save her from certain death. Song at end: "Sorry"
74	22	"Desk Jockey"	6 April 2009	322
Devastated after failing his Bernouli Training School audition, Jack tries to resign from Pine Hollow. Wanting him to stay, The Saddle Club convince Max to let Jack work in the office and try to reignite Jack's love of horses. Meanwhile, Veronica gets Mr. Bernouli to give Jack another chance with a new wild horse, Striker. In the end, Jack passes his audition and announces that he'll still work at Pine Hollow because he's going to work for Mr. Bernouli part-time. Guest starring: Andrew Blackman Song at end: "It's My Life"
75	23	"Musical Chairs"	7 April 2009	323
Trapped at Pine Hollow due to flash flooding that washed the bridge out, the students are forced to endure a sleepover. They stay up late telling ghost stories. When Desi goes hyper after she thinks she’s eaten paprika, she takes delight in telling Veronica. Song at end: "Just Because". (Note: "Just Because" features Carl Dixon on the Guitar.)
76	24	"Breaking Up is Hard to Do"	8 April 2009	324
When Stevie and Lisa have an argument on The Saddle Club's anniversary, it looks like the group could be broken for good. It's up to Carole to make the girls look beyond their differences and remember their love of horses, in order to save their friendship. Song at end: "We'll Pull Through"
77	25	"Happy Trails"	9 April 2009	325
As part of their final assessment, the Pine Hollow students take part in an overnight endurance ride. But when the group goes missing, the students must use their survival skills and teamwork to make their way back to civilization. Song at end: "My Thoughts"
78	26	"England or Bust (Riding to England)"	10 April 2009	326
After Carole is selected for a scholarship at a prestigious international riding academy for the summer, a jealous Veronica informs her that it will cost $15,000.00 to ship Starlight to England so she decides not to go. It looks like Veronica and Garnet will take Carole and Starlight's places in England all Summer. Stevie and Lisa decide to host a musical fundraiser at JB's so that Carole and Starlight can afford to travel overseas and take part in the opportunity of a lifetime. Song at end: "Everybody Come On" Note: This is the final episode of The Saddle Club.
