= List of fictional horse trainers =

A list of fictional horse trainers Illustrates the horse trainer as a notable character in works about the horse and its role in human culture.

== In books ==
- Henry Dailey, a retired horse-trainer who befriends a young boy and a wild black stallion who were rescued from a desert island in The Black Stallion book series, by Walter Farley. Mickey Rooney portrayed the role of Henry Dailey in the 1979 film The Black Stallion. For his performance, he received an Academy Award nomination for Best Actor in a Supporting Role.
- Farmer Grey, the farmer and first owner of the eponymous Beauty, from the 1877 book Black Beauty, by Anna Sewell. While not a horse trainer by profession, Farmer Grey is the character who first instills in Beauty a sense of human kindness.
- Clint, a cowboy living in the western United States, finds and captures a wild horse in the 1926 novel, Smoky the Cowhorse, by Will James. Clint gently breaks in the horse, taking care not to break his spirit. Clint names him Smoky and trains him in to be a cow pony. The story follows Smoky as his life takes several turns for the worse, when he is stolen from the ranch and repeatedly beaten by the thief for not allowing himself to be ridden. Smoky develops an intense hatred for humans and eventually attacks and kills the thief. Smoky becomes an outlaw and winds up as a bucking bronco in a rodeo, due to his violent and aggressive behavior. Later in the story, Clint and Smoky are reunited, with Clint working carefully to restore to Smoky the spirit he once had. The story won the Newbery Medal in 1927.

== See also ==
- List of fictional horses
- Wonder horses
