= Get a Clue =

2002 film

- DVD cover
- Genre: Comedy; Mystery; Teen
- Written by: Alana Burgi Sanko
- Directed by: Maggie Greenwald
- Starring: Lindsay Lohan; Brenda Song; Bug Hall; Ian Gomez
- Music by: David Mansfield
- Country of origin: United States
- Original language: English

Production
- Executive producer: Deborah Ellis Leoni
- Producer: Josette Perrotta
- Cinematography: Rhett Morita
- Editor: Keith Reamer
- Running time: 80 minutes
- Production company: Flagstaff Pictures
- Budget: $1 million

Original release
- Network: Disney Channel
- Release: June 28, 2002

Get a Clue is a 2002 American mystery comedy film released as a Disney Channel Original Movie. It stars Lindsay Lohan as Lexy Gold, a teenage high school student who investigates a mystery after one of her teachers goes missing. The film premiered on Disney Channel on June 28, 2002. It was directed by Maggie Greenwald and was written by Alana Sanko.

== Plot ==
Lexy Gold lives amongst the wealthy and elite of Manhattan, New York. She serves as an advice columnist in her school newspaper but competes for status with middle-class Jack Downey, the editor. When an article and photograph Lexy has taken of her teacher, Mr. Orlando Walker, is published in the city's daily paper, he goes missing and his car is found in the East River. With help from Lexy's best friend Jen Hervey and one of her schoolmates Gabe Nelson (Ali Mukaddam), Lexy and Jack set out to solve the mystery behind the disappearance.

Their teacher, Miss Gertrude Dawson, becomes involved as she and Mr. Walker were romantically involved. Jack receives a message from Mr. Walker about a scholarship. Lexy and Jack search his old apartment, where they run into Detective Charles Meany, who is searching for Mr. Walker. Jen and Gabe watch Miss Dawson at Gabe's house with a video camera to keep an eye on her. Lexy and Jack later meet Mr. Walker's mother, Mrs. Petrossian, at her house. They discover that Mr. Walker changed his identity after being accused of stealing $10,000,000. Mr. Walker later receives a letter from the real person who stole the money, framing Mr. Walker.

The group and Mr. Walker meet at a hotel to pretend to receive the money. Miss Dawson shows up at the hotel and is taken hostage by the real thief. Lexy and Jack search the halls for the man, who is revealed to be Detective Meany, whose real name is Falco Grandville, Mr. Walker's boss when he worked at a bank in Arizona, and the man who had framed Mr. Walker for the money theft. The team catches up with him and he is later arrested. It is later revealed that Mr. Walker's mother found a brooch at Falco's office by chance and decided to keep it; Falco has purchased the rare and expensive canary diamond brooch to hide the stolen $10 million, lost it and blamed Walker for its loss believing Walker stole the brooch. After Mr. Walker is pronounced a free man at last, he later asks Miss Dawson to marry him. At the end, it shows the wedding with Jack, Lexy, Jen, and Gabe. Jack and Lexy share a moment between themselves before the four teens walk down the street.

== Cast ==
- Lindsay Lohan as Alexandra "Lexy" Gold, a teenage amateur journalist.
- Bug Hall as Jack Downey, editor of the school newspaper.
- Ian Gomez as Nicholas Petrossian / Mr. Orlando Walker, one of Lexy's teachers.
- Brenda Song as Jennifer "Jen" Hervey, Lexy's fashion-conscious best friend.
- Al Mukadam as Gabe Nelson, an amateur photographer.
- Dan Lett as Frank Gold, Lexy's father, a journalist with the New York Times.
- Amanda Plummer as Miss Gertrude Dawson, a teacher who is in love with Mr. Walker.
- Charles Shaughnessy as Detective Charles Meany / Falco Grandville, the main antagonist of the film.
- Kim Roberts as Miss Stern, the admission officer who ends up dating Mr. Goldblum.
- Eric Fink as Mr. Goldblum, the teacher advisor of the school newspaper who ends up dating Miss Stern.
- Jennifer Pisana as Taylor Gold, Lexy's tech-savvy little sister.
- Sylvia Lennick as Mrs. Petrossian, the mother of Nicholas Petrossian.
- Cheryl MacInnis as Mrs. Somerville, a covert operations officer of the CIA.
- Timm Zemanek as Mr. Greenblatt, a taxidermist
- Gerry Quigley as Detective Potter
- Craig Lamar Traylor (unconfirmed)
- Keenan MacWilliam as Karen
- Sugith Varughese as Homeless Man/Gary Eicar

== Production ==
Production began in May 2001. Get a Clue was written by Alana Sanko; the script was still unfinished by the time filming had begun. Maggie Greenwald was confirmed to direct and Lindsay Lohan was cast as Lexy Gold, ending her three-movie deal with The Walt Disney Company. The film was primarily filmed in Toronto, Ontario, Canada, with some of the exterior scenes filmed on location in Manhattan, New York. Millington Prep, the school Lexy and her friends attend, was filmed at Bishop Strachan School in Toronto.

The film was originally to be released in January 2002 as the Disney Channel Movie of the Month. A well-concealed reshoot took place in late 2001 to film a different ending concluding that the villain in the film was Meany. In the original ending, the villain turned out to be Mrs. Stern, a teacher at Lexy's school who had known Mr. Walker while he was living in Arizona. This ending was shown on the DVD (though the viewer has the option to watch either ending when the movie reaches 61 minutes, with the Mrs. Stern ending shown in a different aspect ratio than the rest of the movie). The film was heavily promoted by and frequently re-aired on Disney Channel during its initial summer. A song by the Canadian band Prozzäk, "Get a Clue", appeared in the film, and the music video was regularly shown on the channel at the time of its release. The name of the band was changed to "Simon and Milo", the characters depicted in the music video so their band name would not be associated with drugs.
