= Don't Ask Me (Heli Simpson song) =

- Single Cover

Single by Heli Simpson

from the album Princess Veronica
- Released: 12 January 2004
- Recorded: 2003
- Genre: Pop
- Length: 2:21
- Label: Shock Records
- Songwriter: Nicole Fletcher

Heli Simpson singles chronology
"Don't Ask Me"	"Princess Veronica Tour EP"

"Don't Ask Me" is the only single by Heli Simpson. The single is the latest of The Saddle Club cast member to release a single. The single had fared quite well in Australia. After "Don't Ask Me" came out Heli's only album Princess Veronica came out in 2004. Heli Simpson's only EP is "Princess Veronica Tour EP" which was also released in 2004.

== Track listings ==
CD single

1. "Don't Ask Me"
2. "Money Can't Buy"
3. "Princess Veronica"
4. Album Medley ("The Way You Are", "Crazy", "Holding Onto You", "I Want You To Know", "A Girl Like Me", "All I Want", "No One Like You")

== Charts ==
The single debuted and peaked at #16 on the ARIA Singles chart, before taking a plunge to #28 the following week. It then fell to #40, before making a 13 spot rise to #27, then #35 then exiting the top 50 for the last time.

Year	Chart	Peak position
2004	ARIA Singles Chart	#16
2004	ARIA Australian Singles	#4

== Release history ==
Country	Release date	Format	Label	Catalogue
Australia	12 January 2004	CD single	Shock Records	TSC09
