= Princess Veronica =

Studio album by Heli Simpson
- Released: 12 January 2004
- Recorded: 2003
- Genre: Pop
- Label: Shock

Heli Simpson chronology
Princess Veronica (2004)	Princess Veronica Tour EP (2004)

Princess Veronica is the only album released by The Saddle Club cast member Heli Simpson. The album includes Simpson's debut single, "Don't Ask Me". Prior to releasing the album, Simpson released the single "Don't Ask Me". After Princess Veronica, Simpson released the related EP Princess Veronica Tour EP. The album charted at number 75 on the ARIA Albums Chart, spending one week on the chart.

== Track listing ==
1. "The Way You Are"
2. "Don't Ask Me"
3. "I Want You to Know"
4. "Princess Veronica"
5. "A Girl Like Me"
6. "She"
7. "Sister to Me"
8. "All I Want"
9. "Can You Read the Sign?"
10. "No One Like You"
11. "Daddy's Little Girl"
12. "Holding Onto You"
13. "Crazy"
14. "There's Always Room for Love"
15. "Money Can't Buy" (bonus track)

== Charts ==
Chart performance for Princess Veronica
Chart (2004)	Peak position
Australian Albums (ARIA)	75

== Release history ==
Release history for Princess Veronica
Country	Release date	Format	Label	Catalogue
Australia	12 January 2004	CD	Shock	TSC10
