= Seven Horses in the Sky =

1968 single by The Pebbles

- 1968 7" French vinyl single cover

Single by The Pebbles
- B-side: "To the Rising Sun"
- Released: 1968
- Recorded: 1968
- Label: Barclay
- Songwriter(s): Fred Bekky, Bob Baelemans, Hugo Hubert, Luc Smets

"Seven Horses in the Sky" is a 1968 pop song by the Belgian rock band The Pebbles. It was their biggest hit and stayed 11 weeks in the Belgian top 30 chart, reaching fifth place as its highest position.

== Lyrics ==
The song opens with the sound of galloping horses, which was an idea of Pebbles singer Fred Bekky. It then flows into a piano intro, created by singer-guitarist Bob Bobott. The psychedelic lyrics describe seven purple horses racing in a green pouring sky.

== Background information ==
The song was written by Fred Bekky and Bob Bobott, both the singers and guitarists of the band. It was produced by Jean-Claude Petit and released on the label Barclay. It was released on single, with the song To the Rising Sun as its B-side, or The Verger on the French and Canadian editions. The song also appeared on their debut album The Pebbles (1969).

== Charts ==
Chart (1968)	Peak position
Belgium (Ultratop 50 Flanders)	5
Belgium (Ultratop 50 Wallonia)	3
