= The Pebbles =

Belgian rock band

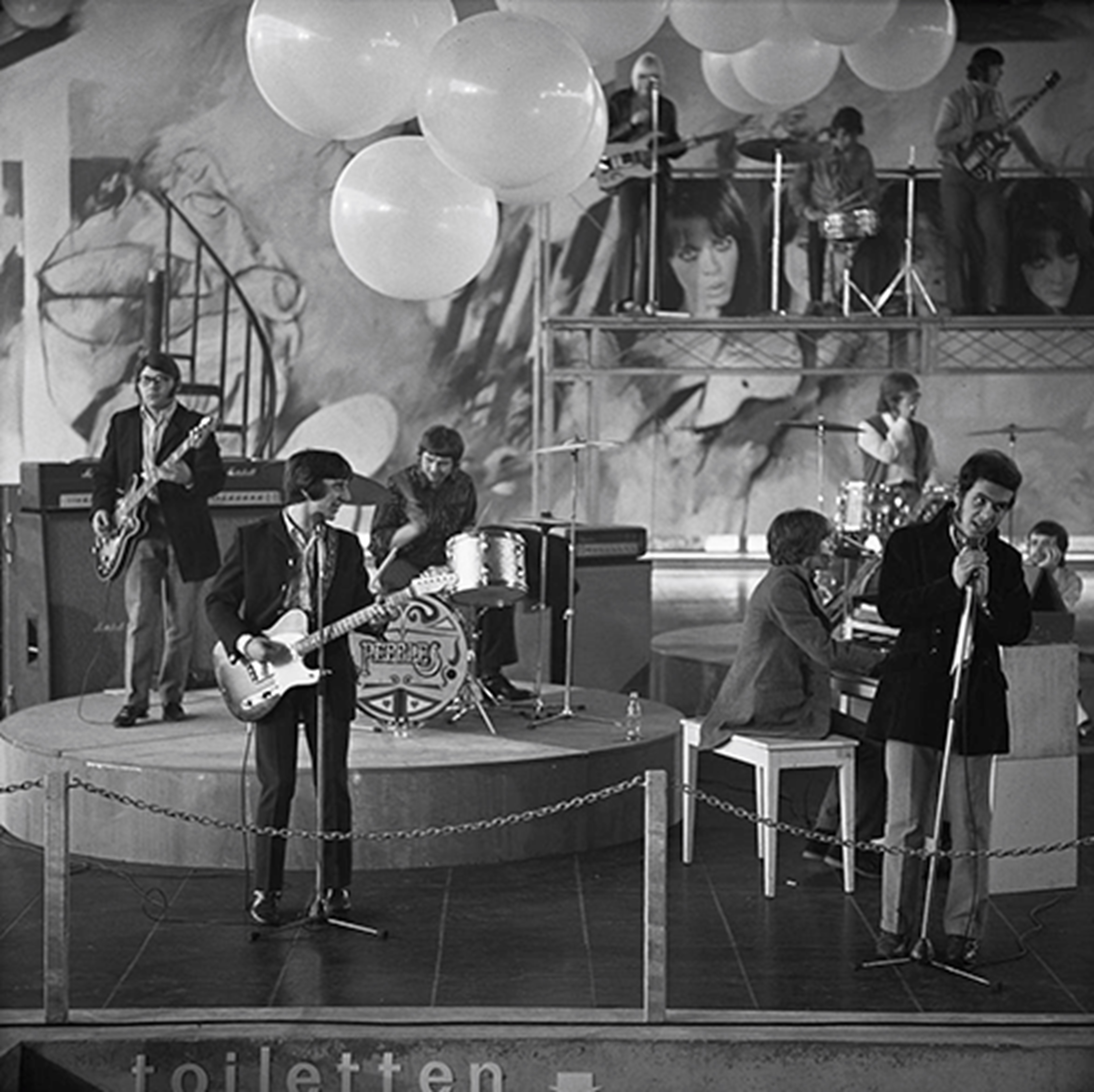
- Pebbles (Dutch TV, 1968)

Background information
- Origin: Hoboken, Antwerp, Belgium
- Genres: Rock, rock and roll, power pop
- Years active: 1965–1974
- Labels: CBS, Cannon, Arcade, Barclay, United Artists
- Past members: Fred "Bekky" Beekmans; Bob "Bobott" Baelemans; Miel Gielon; Axel Van Duyn; Patrick Wyns; Louis De Laet; Marcel de Cauwer; Rafael "Johhny" Verhas; Tony Gyselnk; Luc Smets; Tim Turcksin; Ronny Brack

The Pebbles were a Belgian rock band from Hoboken, Antwerp in Belgium, who came out of the beat boom and achieved international success in the late 1960s.

== History ==
The band was formed in Hoboken, Antwerp by Fred "Bekky" Beekmans and Bob "Bobott" Baelemans, initially calling themselves 'The Fredstones'. In 1965, they met producer Norman Petty, who was on a promo tour in Europe. They recorded a couple of singles with Petty, who also suggested the change of their band name into 'The Pebbles.' In 1967, they signed with manager Louis de Vries, who was also working with Ferre Grignard. De Vries managed to get them signed with record label Barclay. One year later, they released their single "Get Around", which became their first hit. Their next single "Seven Horses in the Sky" became their biggest success.

The band scored a couple of hits in Belgium, France and Spain and started to build a good live-performance reputation, which resulted in them sharing the bill with Jimi Hendrix and The Small Faces at the Olympia in Paris. Because Barclay was not interested in the Anglo-Saxon world, they never released anything in the United Kingdom. The band decided to send a copy of their single "Incredible George" to George Harrison, who was the main theme of the song. Harrison was charmed by their music, which led The Pebbles into almost signing with Apple Records, the label founded by The Beatles, and sent them a telegram congratulating them. However, Barclay would not let them go so the record deal was off.

In 1969, they released their first album The Pebbles, though the sales were not as good as hoped for. The discussions between members Luc Smets and Fred Bekky, about the musical direction the band was heading in, reached its climax, dividing the band into two. As a result, the band went through some personnel changes.

Years later, they finally managed to end their obligations with Barclay and signed with United Artists, wanting airplay in the UK and United States. In 1973, they released their second album Close Up. They had some minor hits, but never managed to have the same success as before. The band split in 1974, with certain members starting their own projects.

Keyboardist Luc Smets (1 August 1947 – 20 August 2023) died aged 76.

Fred "Bekky" Beekmans {18 February 1944 - 21 February 2025) died aged 81.

== Members ==
- Guitar, vocals: Fred "Bekky" Beekmans (died 2025,) Bob "Bobott" Baelemans
- Bass: Miel Gielen, Axel Van Duyn, Patrick Wyns
- Drums: Louis De Laet, Marcel De Cauwer, Rafael "Johnny" Verhas, Tony Gyselinck
- Keyboard: Luc Smets (died 2023,) Tim Turcksin, Ronny Brack

== Discography ==
=== Albums ===
- The Pebbles / Jess & James – Pop made in Belgium (Music For Pleasure – 1966)
- The Pebbles (Barclay – 1969)
- Close Up (United Artists – 1973)
- The Story of the Pebbles 1964-1994 (Indisc – 1994)

=== Singles ===
- "Let's say goodbye" (CBS, 1965)
- "It's alright with me now" (CBS, 1965)
- "Huma la la la" (Canon, 1966)
- "Someone to love" (Arcade, 1967)
- "I got to sing / You better believe it" (Barclay, 1967)
- "Get Around" (Barclay, 1967)
- "Seven Horses in the Sky" / "The verger" (Barclay, 1968)
- "Incredible George / Playing chess" (Barclay, 1969)
- "Mackintosh" (Barclay, 1969)
- "24 hours at the border" (Barclay, 1970)
- "To the rising sun" (Barclay, 1971)
- "Down at Kiki" (Barclay, 1971)
- "Beggar / Amontillado" / Fire (Barclay, 1971)
- "Mother army" (United Artists, 1972)
- "Jan, Suzy and Phil" (United Artist, 1972)
- "Some kind of joker" (United Artists, 1973)
- "No time at all" (United Artists, 1974)
- "The kid is allright" (United Artists, 1974)
- "Figaro" (Killroy, 1980)
