= Heli Simpson =

Australian actor and singer

Dr Heli Baker
- Born: Heli Simpson; 21 February 1987 (age 39); Melbourne, Victoria, Australia
- Occupations: Actress, Singer, Dancer, Equestrian, Comedian, Doctor
- Website: myspace.com/helisimpsonmusic

Dr. Heli Simpson Baker (born 21 February 1987) is an Australian actress, singer, dancer, equestrian, comedian and doctor best known for her role as Veronica DiAngelo #1 on The Saddle Club. In 2005, Simpson was selected for the Australian team for the International Biology Olympiad in Beijing, winning a bronze medal.

== Biography ==
Simpson was born in Melbourne, and was raised by her English father and Estonian mother with two brothers. Her first acting role was as Veronica DiAngelo #1 in the popular 2001 TV series The Saddle Club Don't Ask Me, was released as Simpson's debut single in 2004, which peaked at #16 on the Australian Recording Industry Association (ARIA) singles chart. It was followed by her only album, Princess Veronica and her EP Princess Veronica Tour EP. Simpson and her former co-star Kia Luby are featured on the original soundtracks for The Saddle Club.

Simpson graduated from Lauriston Girls' School in 2005. At the beginning of 2005, she attended the National Science Olympiad in Canberra, where she represented Australia is the Biology Olympiad. During her Victorian Certificate of Education (VCE) studies, she achieved the maximum percentile ranking of 99.95. She attended the University of Melbourne to study Medicine. She lived on campus for her freshman year. She received a MBBS degree in 2011. Heli is a Intensive case manager at Sacred Heart Mission In Melbourne, Victoria, Australia. In 2022 she changed careers to become an Early Childhood Educator. Heli Simpson is currently a member of the comedy team Boss Octopus. When she was in her 20s Heli worked as a house sitter with Midahome Australia. As of 2019, Heli has pursued a career in medicine.

== Credits ==
=== Television ===
Year	Title	Role	Notes
2000	Animated Tales of the World	Rose (voice)	"Bad Baby Army: A Story from Australia"
2001	Halifax f.p.	Sophie Keenan	"Playing God"
2001–03	The Saddle Club	Veronica DiAngelo #1	Main role
2002	Bootleg	Myrtle Jackson	TV miniseries
2002–03	Blue Heelers	Sam Baxter	Recurring role
2003	Stingers	Libby Sanderson	"Heartbeat"
2004	Fergus McPhail	Sophie Bartolemeo	Main role

=== Stage ===
Year	Title	Role	Notes
2010	Boston Marriage	Catherine	Malvern Theatre

== Discography ==
=== Albums ===
List of albums, with selected details and chart positions
Title	Details	Peak chart positions
Title	Details	AUS
Princess Veronica	Released: 2004; Label: Shock; Format: CD	75

=== Extended plays ===
- Princess Veronica Tour EP (2004)

=== Singles ===
List of singles, with selected chart positions
Title	Year	Peak chart positions	Album
Title	Year	AUS	Album
"Don't Ask Me"	2004	16	Princess Veronica
