= The Saddle Club =

Australian-Canadian children's television series

- Genre: Children's television series Adventure; Comedy drama Family
- Created by: Bonnie Bryant
- Developed by: Sarah Dodd
- Starring: Keenan MacWilliam (Seasons 1–2); Sophie Bennett (Seasons 1–2); Lara Jean Marshall (Seasons 1–2); Heli Simpson (Seasons 1–2); Kia Luby (Seasons 1–2); Victoria Campbell (Season 3); Lauren Dixon (Season 3); Ariel Kaplan (Season 3); Marny Kennedy (Season 3); Aisha Dee (Season 3)
- Opening theme: "Hello World" (Instrumental) by Belle Perez (Seasons 1–2) "Hello World" (Season 3)
- Ending theme: "Hello World" (Seasons 1–3); Various songs (Seasons 2–3)
- Composers: Dale Cornelius (Season 1); Stephen Skratt; Jack Lenz (Seasons 2–3)
- Countries of origin: Australia; Canada
- Original language: English
- No. of series: 3
- No. of episodes: 78 (list of episodes)

Production
- Producer: Lynn Bayonas
- Running time: 24 minutes
- Production companies: Crawford Productions; Protocol Entertainment

Original release
- Network: YTV (Canada); ABC TV (Australia); Nine Network (Australia)
- Release: April 30, 2001 – April 10, 2009

The Saddle Club is a children's television series developed by Sarah Dodd, based on the books written by Bonnie Bryant. Like the book series, the scripted live action series follows the lives of three best friends in training to compete in equestrian competitions at the fictional Pine Hollow Stables, while dealing with problems in their personal lives. This series debuted in 2001 and ended in 2009.

== Premise ==
The series follows the experiences of three girls, who establish a club called "The Saddle Club" after recognizing their mutual passion for horse riding. Their rival is another young rider at the stables named Veronica DiAngelo.

Throughout the series, The Saddle Club navigates their rivalry with Veronica, training for competitions, horse shows, and the quotidian dramas that arise between friends and staff in the fictional Pine Hollow Stables. In each show, The Saddle Club prevails over its adversities, usually sending a message emphasizing the importance of friendship and teamwork.

== Episodes ==
Series	Episodes	Originally released	
Series	Episodes	First released	Last released
1	26	30 April 2001	4 June 2001
2	26	28 April 2003	2 June 2003
3	26	7 September 2008	10 April 2009

== Cast ==
Characters	Season 1	Season 2	Season 3
Carole Hanson	Keenan MacWilliam	Keenan MacWilliam	Victoria Campbell
Stephanie "Stevie" Lake	Sophie Bennett	Sophie Bennett	Lauren Dixon
Elizabeth "Lisa" Atwood	Lara Jean Marshall	Lara Jean Marshall	Ariel Kaplan
Veronica DiAngelo	Heli Simpson	Heli Simpson	Marny Kennedy
Kristina "Kristi" Cavanaugh	Kia Luby	Kia Luby	
Desiree "Desi" Biggins			Aisha Dee
Melanie Atwood	Marisa Siketa	Jessica Jacobs	Ella-Rose Shenman
Ashley Taylor	Janelle Corlass-Brown	Janelle Corlass-Brown	
Jessica "Jess" Cooper			Kaiya Jones
Elizabeth "Mrs. Reg" Regnery	Catherine Wilkin	Catherine Wilkin	Briony Behets
Maximillion "Max" Regnery	Brett Tucker	Brett Tucker	Richard Davies
Dorothee Doutey		Matylda Buczko	
Jackson "Jack" O'Neil			Troy Lovett
Phillip "Phil" Marsten	Glenn Meldrum	Glenn Meldrum	Cosmo Feltham
Murray Richards		Troy Lovett	Rory Donegan
Deborah Hale Regnery	Cathy Godbold	Cathy Godbold	
Andrew "Drew" Regnery		Nikolai Nikolaeff	
Redford "Red" O'Malley	Nathan Phillips	James O'Dea	
Brian "Scooter" Mucahy		Alex Marriott	
Megan	Sophie Hensser		
Samuel "Sam"	Anthony Hammer		
Simon Atherton			Connor Jessup
Dr. Judith "Judy" Barker	Maggie King	Maggie King	Leverne McDonnell
Ashley "Chewie" Becker			Jackson Gallagher
Eleanor Atwood	Marie-Louise Walker	Marie-Louise Walker	
Colonel Mitchell "Mitch" Hanson	Christopher Kirby	Christopher Kirby	Christopher Kirby
Helen DiAngelo	Melanie Ryder		
Frances "Frank" DiAngelo	Anthony Hawkins	Anthony Hawkins	
Orlando Cooper			Gerard Kennedy
John Brightstar	Nick Russell		

Note: A grey cell indicates the character did not appear in that series.

== Production ==
The original series was filmed in Yarra Valley, Victoria in Australia, but involved a cast of mixed nationalities.

In 2007, a news release announced a casting call and the production of a third series, which was filmed from late 2007 to early 2008. The third series was filmed in Daylesford, Victoria.

== Broadcast ==
The show was broadcast from 2001 until 2009, with 78 episodes over three series. The third series broadcast from September 7, 2008 to April 10, 2009. Regionally, the cast of the television series released a series of music albums such as Friends Forever, On Top of the World, Secrets & Dreams and Hello World – The Best of the Saddle Club, and appeared in live performances such as the 2004 Sydney Royal Easter Show. A new Saddle Club CD, Best Friends, was sold in Australia in stores and on The Saddle Club's website and in the US and Canada as a digital download.

The popularity of the series soon after its premiere on YTV and the ABC promoted international syndication and it made its American debut in January 2002 on Discovery Kids.

In the United States, the series later aired on Horse Racing TV and was distributed independently by Connecticut Public Television and American Public Television through public television stations nationwide, most notably PBS. The series also briefly aired in reruns on The Hub.

In Canada, it aired on YTV, and in the United Kingdom on CITV, Horse & Country and Pop Girl. It was broadcast by the French children's specialty channel Gulli, dubbed into French.

Series 3 was broadcast on Discovery Kids in the United States starting on February 22, 2009, while sneak views has been shown on "Saddle Club Sundays" in December 2008. In Australia, the new series commenced on Channel Nine and WIN TV on March 7, 2009.

WIN Television airs a compilation movie of "Horse Shy", "Mystery Weekend" and "School Horse" (episode 6-8 of series 1) every Christmas Day since 2017.

== Reboot ==
A CGI animated reboot is currently in production, which is scheduled to release in 2027.

== Other media ==
=== Australian Videos ===
- The Saddle Club: Adventures At Pine Hollow (2001)
- The Saddle Club: Horse Crazy (2002)
- The Saddle Club: The Mane Event (2003)
- The Saddle Club: The First Adventure (2003)
- The Saddle Club: Friends Forever (2004)
- The Saddle Club: Storm (2004)
- The Saddle Club: Saving Pine Hollow (2005)

=== Australian DVDs ===
- The Saddle Club: Adventures At Pine Hollow (2002)
- The Saddle Club: Horse Crazy (2003)
- The Saddle Club: The Mane Event (2003)
- The Saddle Club: The First Adventure (2003)
- The Saddle Club: Friends Forever (2004)
- The Saddle Club: Storm (2004)
- The Saddle Club: Saving Pine Hollow (2005)
- The Saddle Club: Series 1 (2005)
- The Saddle Club: Series 2 (2006)
- The Saddle Club: The First Adventure (2009 Re-release)
- The Saddle Club: Adventures at Pine Hollow (2009 Re-release) - Released as "More Adventures at Pine Hollow"
- The Saddle Club: Horse Crazy (2009 Re-release)
- The Saddle Club: The Mane Event (2009 Re-release)
- The Saddle Club: Friends Forever (2009 Re-release)
- The Saddle Club: Storm (2009 Re-release)
- The Saddle Club: Saving Pine Hollow (2009 Re-release)
- The Saddle Club: Back in the Saddle (2010)
- The Saddle Club: Back in the Saddle (Handle Case) (2010)
- The Saddle Club: Horseback Riders (2010)
- The Saddle Club: Horseback Riders (Handle Case) (2010)
- The Saddle Club: Ride Free (2010)
- The Saddle Club: Staying the Distance (2010)
- The Saddle Club: Happy Trails (2010)

=== Computer game ===
- The Saddle Club: Willowbrook Stables (2002)
- The Saddle Club (2010)

== Discography ==
=== Studio albums ===
List of studio albums, with selected details, chart positions and certifications
Title	Album details	Peak chart positions	Certifications
Title	Album details	AUS	Certifications
Fun for Everyone	Released: November 2002; Label: Shock (TSC02); Formats: CD	45	
On Top of the World	Released: May 2003; Label: Shock (TSC03); Formats: CD	20	ARIA: Gold
Friends Forever	Released: September 2003; Label: Shock (TSC06); Formats: CD	38	
Secrets & Dreams	Released: April 2004; Label: Shock (TSC12); Formats: CD	49	

=== Compilation albums ===
List of compilation albums, with selected details and chart positions
Title	Album details	Peak chart positions
Title	Album details	AUS
Hello World – The Best of the Saddle Club	Released: November 2004; Label: Shock (TSC14); Formats: CD	59
Best Friends	Released: 2009; Label: Shock (TSC 301); Formats: CD	—

=== Extended plays ===
- Special Mane Event (2004)

=== Singles ===
List of singles, with selected chart positions
Title	Year	Peak chart positions	Certifications
Title	Year	AUS	Certifications
"We Are the Saddle Club"	2002	—	
"Hello World"/"Hey Hey What You Say"	2002	20	ARIA: Gold
"Wonderland"	2003	17	
"Boogie Oogie Oogie"/"Undercover Movers and Shakers"	2003	29	
"Everybody Come On"	2003	—	
"Undercover Movers and Shakers"	2004	42	
"L.I.F.E."	2004	34	
"Welcome to the Saddle Club"	2004	—	
"Sleeping Under the Stars"	2004	—	
"These Girls"	2009	—	

=== Read Along CD ===
- The Saddle Club: Horse Sense (2002) – ABC Audio 3-hour, 3-CD set read by Lucy Bell

=== Sophie & Kia ===
==== Albums ====
- Planet Tokyo (2005) – Australia
- He's Everything (2005) – Australia
- Raw Beauty (2005) – Australia
- Spin (2005) – Australia
- Raw Beauty Acoustic Sessions (2005) – Australia

==== Singles ====
- "Planet Tokyo" (2005) – No. 41 Australia
- "He's Everything" (2005) – No. 40 Australia

=== Heli Simpson ===
==== Albums ====
- Princess Veronica (2004)

==== Extended plays ====
- Princess Veronica Tour (2004)

==== Singles ====
- "Don't Ask Me" (2004) – No. 16 Australia

=== Ashley and Melanie ===
==== Singles ====
- "Trouble" (2003) – No. 30 Australia

== Awards ==
=== ARIA Music Awards ===
Year	Nominated works	Award	Result
2003	On Top of the World	Best Children's Album	Nominated
2003	On Top of the World	Best Original Cast/Show Recording	Nominated
2004	Friends Forever	Best Children's Album	Nominated
2009	Best Friends	Best Children's Album	Nominated
