= Sophie Bennett =

Canadian actress and singer (born 1989)

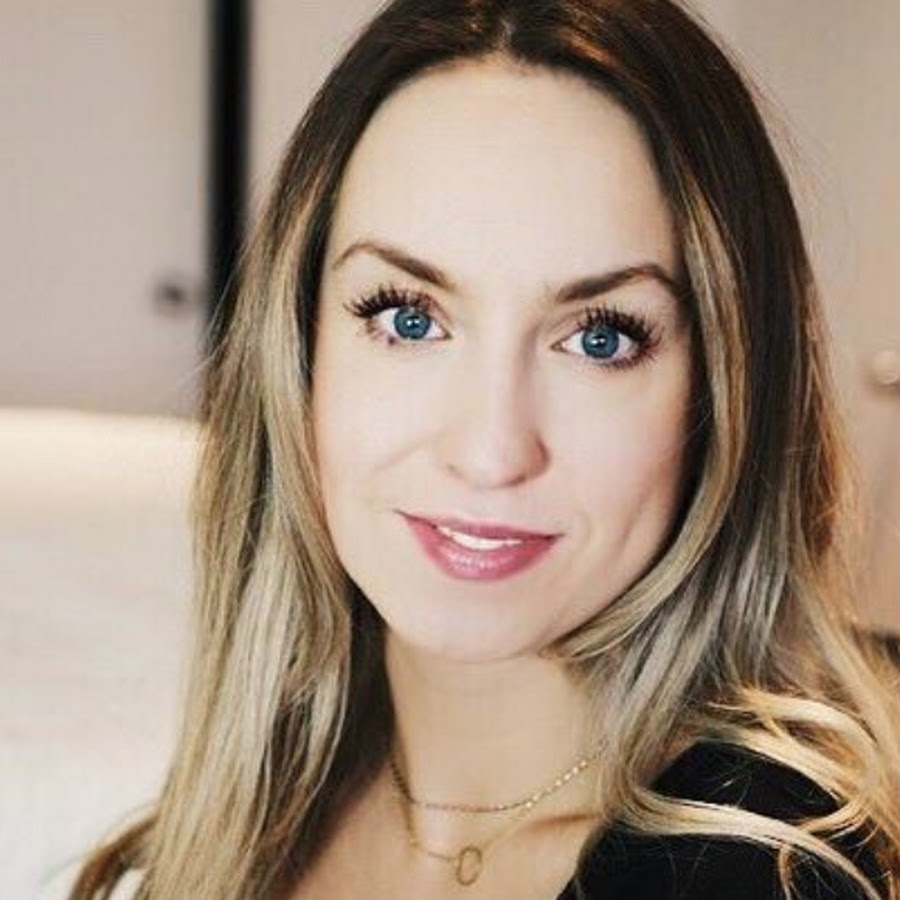
- Sophie Bennett in 2018
- Born: Sophie Maude Bennett; February 6, 1989 (age 37); Toronto, Ontario, Canada
- Occupations: Actress, singer, dancer, producer, director, project manager
- Years active: 1996–present
- Relatives: Zachary Bennett (brother)
- Website: myspace.com/sophieandkia

Sophie Maude Bennett (born February 6, 1989) is a Canadian actress, singer, dancer, producer, director, and project manager. She is best known for her role as Stevie Lake #1 on the Australian television series The Saddle Club.

== Career ==
=== The Saddle Club ===
In 2000, at the age of 11, Bennett moved to Australia for six months after being cast as Stevie Lake #1 in "The Saddle Club". During the show's sporadic run, Bennett has released four albums with her co-stars under the name The Saddle Club, all of which made the Australian charts with two earning "Gold" status.

Bennett and other cast members performed The Saddle Club Arena Show on horseback during the Sydney Royal Easter Show in 2004 at the Sydney SuperDome.

=== Music ===
From 2001 to 2004, Bennett recorded five Saddle Club albums (Fun For Everyone, On Top Of The World, Friends Forever, Hello World: The Best Of The Saddle Club, Saddle Club Greatest Hits , Summer With The Saddle Club, and Secrets & Dreams). In 2003, Bennett was signed with Shock Records, and has released five CDs and two singles with former Saddle Club co-star Kia Luby.

=== After The Saddle Club ===
After graduating from Vaughan Road Academy in 2007 Sophie went on to study Media, Theory and Production at The University of Western Ontario. Today Sophie Bennett works as a director and producer in Canada. Sophie is also a project manager in Toronto, Ontario, Canada and runs her own YouTube channel.

== Filmography ==
Film and television
Year	Title	Role	Notes
1996	Critical Choices	Danette	TV movie
1996	Goosebumps	Medieval Girl	Episode: "A Night in Terror Tower": Part 2
1997	When Secrets Kill	Crystal Hughes	TV movie
1998	Goosebumps	Katie Zinman	Episode: "Bride of the Living Dummy"
1998	Real Kids, Real Adventures	Stephanie	Episode: "Runaway Balloon"
1998	The Mighty	Little Girl	
1998	Universal Soldier II: Brothers in Arms	Annie	TV movie
2000	Code Name: Eternity	Jenny	Episode: "Laura's Story"
2001–03	The Saddle Club	Stephanie "Stevie" Lake #1	Main role
2002	Odyssey 5	Brianna Mason	1 episode
2002	Salem Witch Trials	Abigail Williams	TV movie
2004	What Katy Did	Elsie Carr	TV movie
2011-12	Seven News	Herself	4 episodes
2012	Where Do We Go From Here	Sasha	Short film
2013	Long Story, Short	Sasha	1 episode

== Discography ==
=== The Saddle Club soundtracks ===
- Fun For Everyone (2002)
- On Top of the World (2003)
- Friends Forever (2003)
- Secrets & Dreams (2004)
- Hello World – The Best Of The Saddle Club (2004)
- Summer With The Saddle Club (2008)
- The Saddle Club – Greatest Hits (2009)
- Grand Gallop – Hello World (2009)

=== Sophie and Kia: albums ===
- Planet Tokyo (2005) – Australia
- He's Everything (2005) – Australia
- Raw Beauty (2005) – Australia
- Spin (2005) – Australia
- Raw Beauty Acoustic Sessions (2005) – Australia

=== Solo singles ===
- Nothing To Say
- I'd Rather Be With You
- I Just Wanna Belong
