= Keenan MacWilliam =

Canadian actress

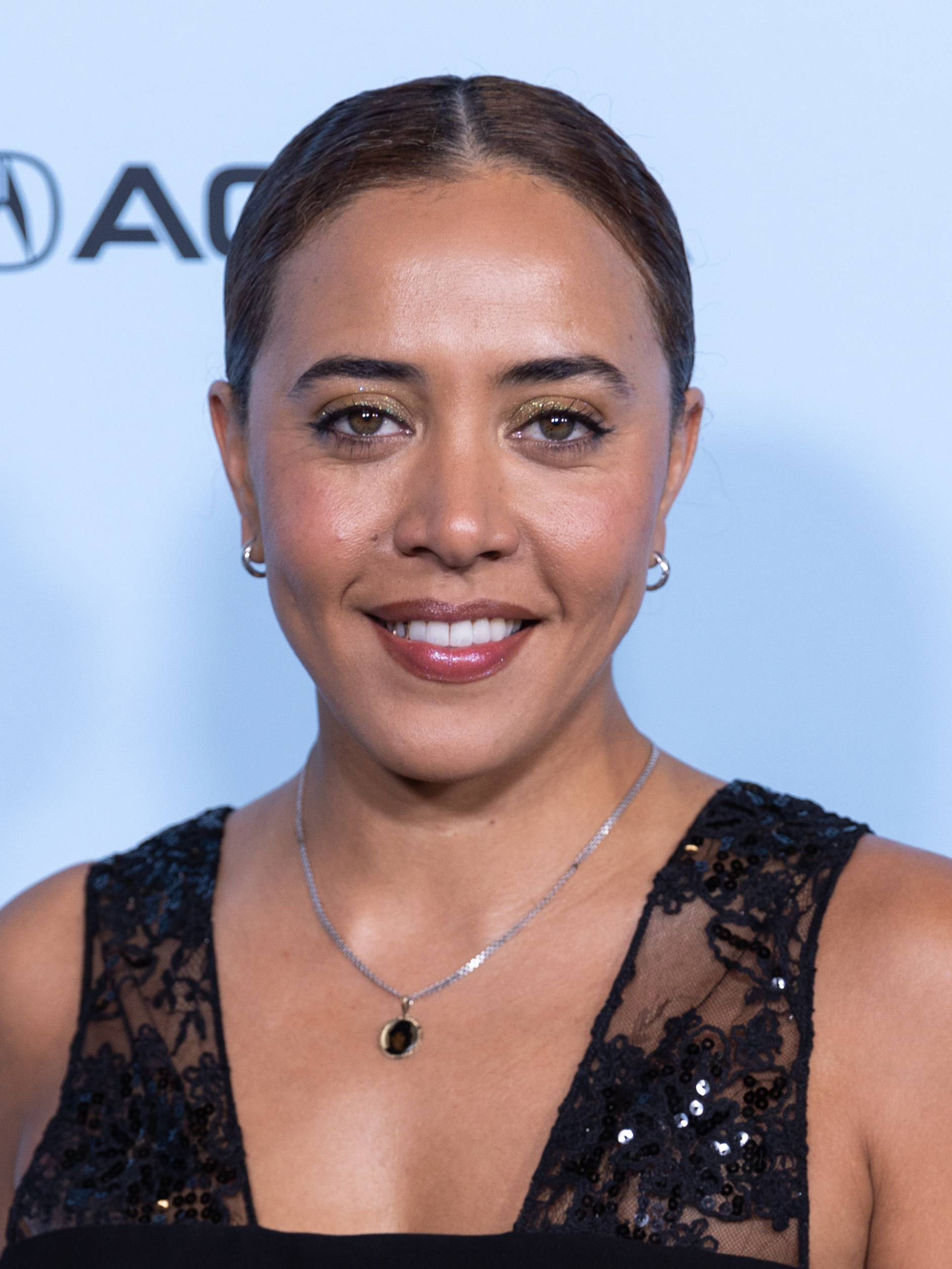
- Keenan MacWilliam in 2025
- Born: Keenan MacWilliam; 30 March 1989 (age 37); Toronto, Ontario, Canada
- Occupations: Actress, singer, dancer, writer, director, fashion designer, producer, art director, graphic designer, associate producer
- Years active: 1999–present

Keenan MacWilliam (born 30 March 1989) is a Canadian actress, singer, and dancer. She is best known for her roles as Carole Hanson #1 on The Saddle Club and Karen in the Disney Channel original movie Get a Clue.

== Early and later life ==
MacWilliam was born in Toronto to a White Scottish father and an African-Guyanese mother.

She began singing and took guitar lessons when she was six years old and taking singing lessons when she was seven years old, singing in the Ottawa Children's Choir for two years. Currently, she is also a writer, director, art director, fashion designer, graphic designer in addition to being a producer and associate producer.

MacWilliam lives in New York and works as an art director and associate producer.

== The Saddle Club ==
In 2001 until 2003, MacWilliam was cast as Carole Hanson #1 in The Saddle Club, a television series based on a series of books written by Bonnie Bryant. During the show's sporadic run, she released several albums with the co-stars of the series. They have all charted in Australia, two of which earned Gold status.

She and her other castmates performed The Saddle Club Arena Show on horseback during the Sydney Royal Easter Show in 2004 at the Sydney SuperDome in Sydney.

== Filmography ==
Film and television
Year	Title	Role	Notes
1999	Deep in My Heart	Young Barbara	TV film
1999	The Bone Collector	Rhyme's Niece	
1999	Must Be Santa	Heather	TV film
2000	Are You Afraid of the Dark?	Emily	"The Tale of the Night Nurse"
2000	The Best Girl	Alice	Short film
2001–03	The Saddle Club	Carole Hanson	Main role
2002	The Saddle Club: Adventures at Pine Hollow	Carole Hanson	Video
2002	Get a Clue	Karen	TV film
2004	Soul Food	Amina	"Decisions and Choices", "Survival Techniques", "In the Garden"
2008	Prom Wars	Meg	

== Discography ==
=== The Saddle Club Albums ===
- Fun For Everyone (2002)
- On Top of the World (2003)
- Friends Forever (2003)
- Secrets & Dreams (2004)
- Hello World – The Best of the Saddle Club (2004)
- Summer with the Saddle Club (2008)
- The Saddle Club – Greatest Hits (2009)
- Grand Gallop – Hello World (2009) Released in France only.

=== The Saddle Club Singles ===
- "We Are the Saddle Club" (2002) – Australia
- "Hello World" (2002) – #27 Australia #8 France
- "Hey Hey What You Say" (2003) – #20 Australia
- "Hello World"/"Hey Hey What You Say" (2003)
- "Wonderland" (2003) – #17 Australia
- Special Mane Event EP (2004)
- "Undercover Movers and Shakers/Boogie Oogie Oogie" (2003) – #29 Australia
- "Everybody Come On" (2003)
- "L.I.F.E" (2004) – #34 Australia
- "Welcome to the Saddle Club" (2004)
- "Sleeping Under the Stars" (2004)

== Solo Singles ==
- Perfect Boy
- Ride Like The Wind
- Mango
