= McRobbie =

McRobbie is a surname. Notable people with the surname include:

- Angela McRobbie (born 1951), British cultural theorist, feminist and commentator
- David McRobbie (born 1934), Australian writer of television, radio and children's literature
- Michael McRobbie (born 1950), the eighteenth president of Indiana University
- Peter McRobbie (born 1943), American actor
