= Angus McLaren =

Australian actor (born 1988)

- McLaren in 2023
- Born: 3 November 1988 (age 37); Wonthaggi, Victoria, Australia
- Occupation: Actor
- Years active: 2000–2023

Angus McLaren (born 3 November 1988) is an Australian actor. He is best known for his roles in the television series Packed to the Rafters as Nathan Rafter and H_{2}O: Just Add Water as Lewis McCartney.

== Early life ==
McLaren was born the youngest of three boys, for mother Kerena, growing up with brothers Rhett and Aidan in Wonthaggi, Victoria, and grew up on a dairy farm near Loch, belonging to his ancestors from Scotland (his family still lives there). He attended Mary Mackillop Catholic National College in Leongatha, Victoria. He was the drummer of the Sydney-based indie band Rapids (Ballet Imperial) and also played bass guitar in the punk band Bogey Lowensteins.

== Career ==
=== 2000–2013 ===
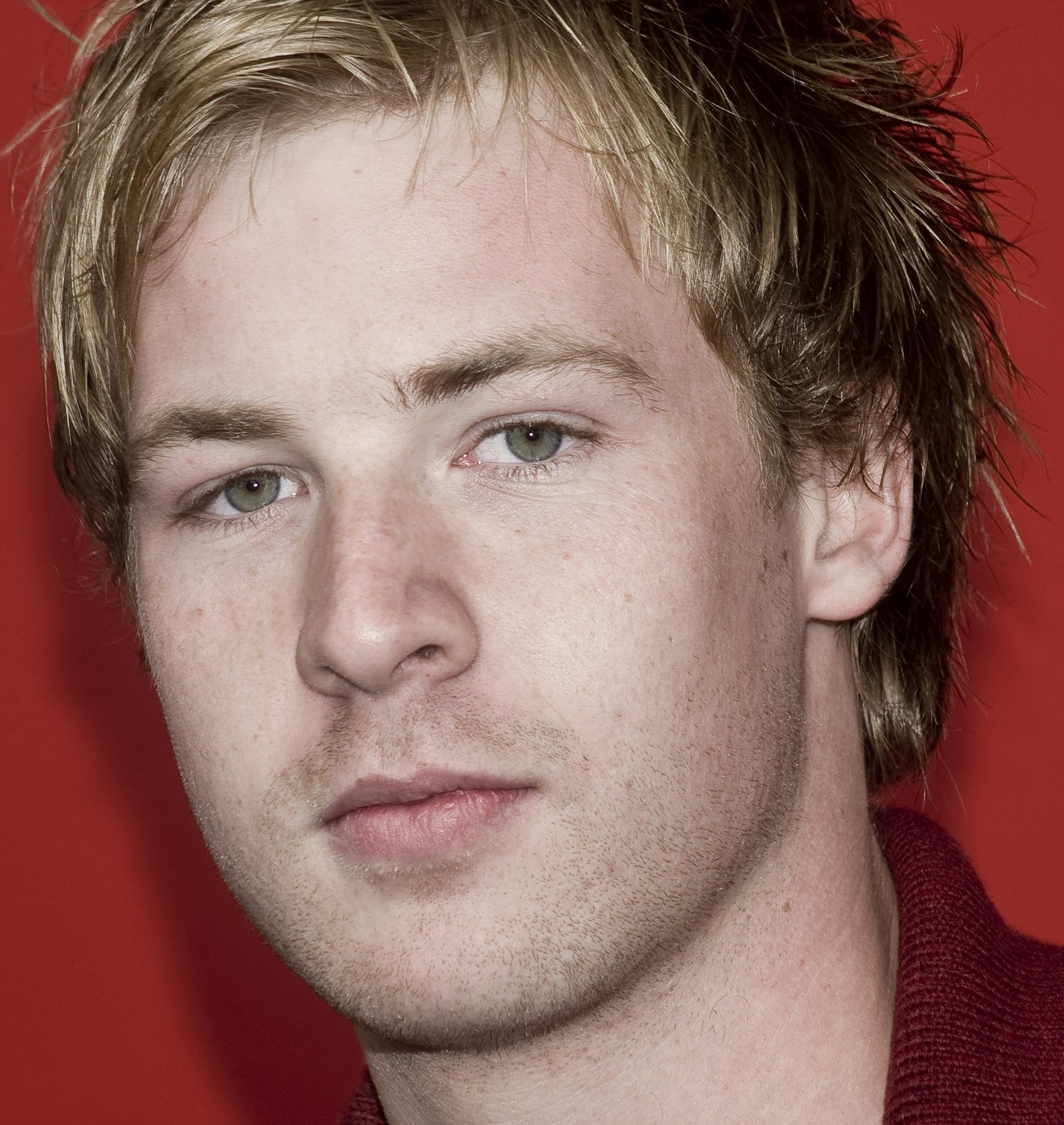
McLaren in 2009

He appeared in a number of school and amateur productions for the Leongatha Lyric Theatre. He made his professional debut when he was 12 years old with a recurring role on the ABC series Something in the Air. Further TV credits followed, including the children's series Worst Best Friends, The Saddle Club and Fergus McPhail, along with guest roles on Blue Heelers, Comedy Inc. and a recurring role on Neighbours.

McLaren's first main cast role came in 2004 with the children's series Silversun, which aired on both the Seven Network and the ABC. His feature film debut followed in 2005 with the low budget Melbourne feature Court of Lonely Royals, directed by Rohan Michael Hoole. 2005 also saw McLaren work on Last Man Standing, and achieve a solid footing on the advert voiceover circuit. In 2006, McLaren began working on the children's series H_{2}O: Just Add Water, appearing from series one through midseason of series three as the character Lewis McCartney (he also briefly appeared at the end of season three, in the finale).

From 2008, he appeared in Packed to the Rafters in the role of Nathan Rafter. He appeared in 102 episodes over the show's six seasons.

=== 2013–2023 ===
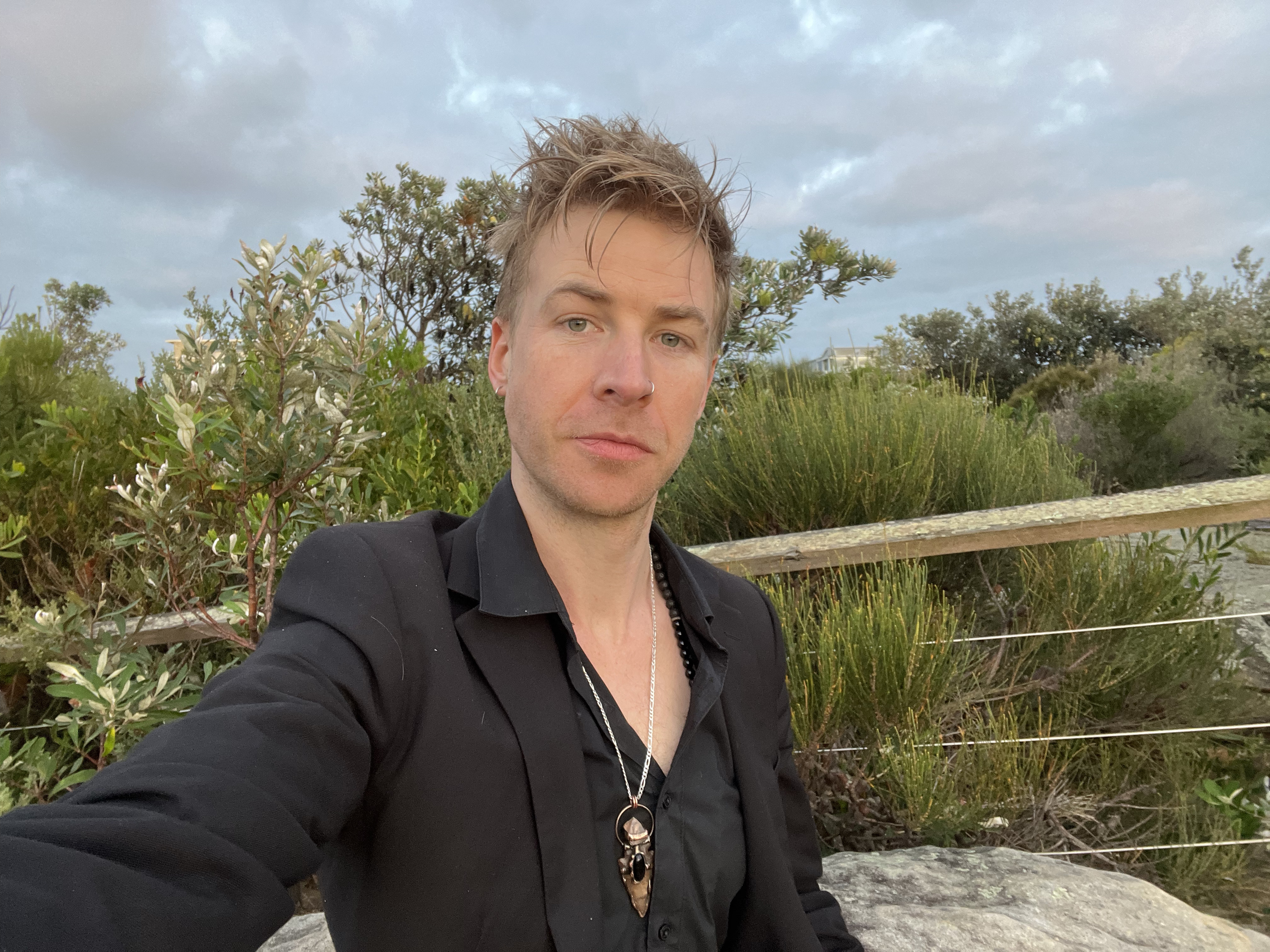
McLaren at Coogee Beach, Sydney, in 2023

Through 2013 and into 2014 he took a variety of master classes in New York, LA, Sydney and Melbourne. He then studied a Bachelor of Acting at the Western Australian Academy of Performing Arts in Perth, Western Australia. While at WAAPA, Angus appeared in eight WAAPA stage productions. He was The Marquis De Sade in WAAPA's production of Marat/Sade, The Man in Tender Napalm and, in his graduating year, received great reviews playing the title role in Shakespeare's Coriolanus.

In 2016, he played the character of William "The Crimson Fiddler" Graham in Quartermaine. He won the Nine Network Channel 9 Best Actor Award at the WA Screen Academy Awards for his portrayal of Will in this short film.

In 2018, it was announced that McLaren had joined the cast of Seven Network soap opera Home and Away as recurring character Lance Salisbury during the show's thirty-first season. He made his first appearance in episode 6860, broadcast on 17 April 2018.

== Theatre ==
Year	Title	Role	Notes
2015	Tender Napalm	The Man	Western Australian Academy of Performing Arts stage production
2015	Marat/Sade	Sade	Western Australian Academy of Performing Arts stage production
2016	Coriolanus	Coriolanus	Western Australian Academy of Performing Arts stage production

== Filmography ==
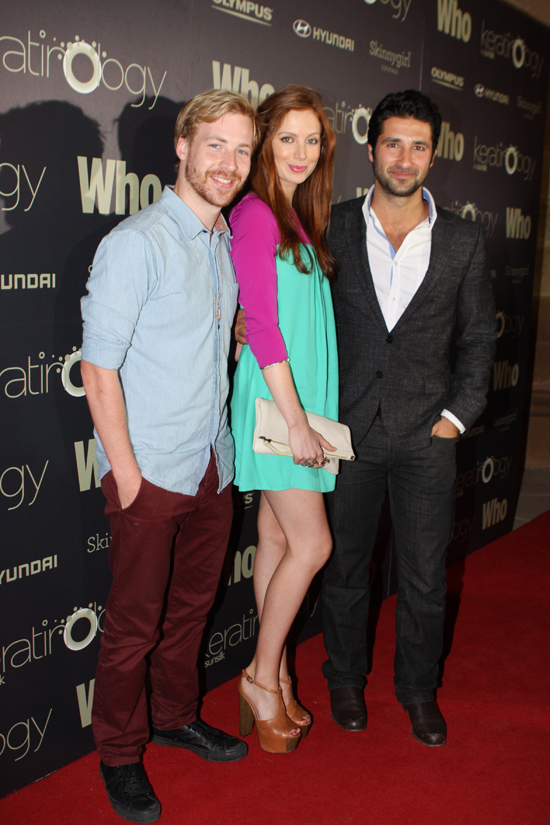
McLaren (left) in 2011

=== Films ===
Year	Title	Role	Notes
2002	Shuang Tong	St. Louis Murder Victim	
2006	Court of Lonely Royals		
2009	Sunset Over Water	Andrew	Short film
2012	Quietus	Sam	Short film
2016	Quartermaine	William Graham	Short film
2018	Hotel Mumbai	Eddie	
2018	The Merger	Carpet Burn	
2018	Crazy About You	Jake ''The Naked Wanderer''	

=== Television ===
Year	Title	Role	Notes
2000–2002	Something in the Air	Jason Cassidy	Season 1–2 (recurring role, 7 episodes)
2002	Worst Best Friends	Eddie	Season 1, episode 5 (guest role)
2002–2003	Neighbours	Michael Toohey	Season 18 (guest role, 2 episodes)
2002–2003	Neighbours	Jamie Clarke	Season 19 (recurring role, 4 episodes)
2003	The Saddle Club	Danny	Season 2 (recurring role, 4 episodes)
2003	CrashBurn	Ben (aged 15)	Season 1, episode 10 (guest role)
2003–2005	Blue Heelers	Brad Delaney	Season 10, episode 7 (guest role)
2003–2005	Blue Heelers	Max Harrison	Season 12, episode 36 (guest role)
2004	Fergus McPhail	Bob	Season 1, episode 4 (guest role)
2004	Silversun	Degenhardt Bell	Season 1–2 (main role, 26 episodes)
2005	Last Man Standing	Brendan Delaney	Season 1, episode 19 (guest role)
2006–2010	H_{2}O: Just Add Water	Lewis McCartney	Season 1–3 (main role, 65 episodes); Season 3, episode 26 (guest role) (Note: McLaren appeared in 65 episodes over the three seasons; he departed the series in the thirteenth episode of season three as a main character, following an absence of twelve episodes, he made a guest appearance in twenty-sixth and final episode of the third season.)
2008	All Saints	Angus Wilson	Season 11, episode 15 (guest role)
2008–2013	Packed to the Rafters	Nathan Rafter	Season 1–4, 6 (main role, 100 episodes); Season 5 (guest role, 2 episodes)
2017	Doctor Doctor	Dr. Toke	Season 2 (recurring role, 6 episodes)
2017	600 Bottles of Wine	Pat	Season 1 (main role, 6 episodes)
2018–2019	Home and Away	Lance Salisbury	Season 31 (recurring role, 18 episodes)
2019	Bloom	Young Frank	Season 1, episode 5 (guest role)
2020	Operation Buffalo	Dalgleish	Miniseries (4 episodes)
2021	Back to the Rafters	Nathan Rafter	Season 1 (main role, 6 episodes)
