= Lee Cormie =

Australian actor (born 1992)

- Born: 8 February 1992 (age 34); Melbourne, Victoria, Australia
- Occupation: Actor
- Years active: 2001─present

Lee Cormie (born 8 February 1992) is an Australian actor known for his starring roles in Darkness Falls and Australian film December Boys alongside Daniel Radcliffe.

== Early life ==
Cormie was educated at Mentone Grammar School in the south-east suburbs of Melbourne.

== Career ==
His first film appearance was in the supernatural horror film Darkness Falls (2003). He then played the role of Misty in 2007 drama film December Boys, opposite Daniel Radcliffe.

Cormie appeared in a main role in Channel 10 series Worst Best Friends and in special guest roles in Blue Heelers, Fergus McPhail and Holly's Heroes. He played Joseph Debs in 2011 Australian telemovie Underbelly Files: Tell Them Lucifer was Here.

== Filmography ==
| Year | Title | Role | Notes |
|---|---|---|---|
| 2002 | Blue Heelers | Michael | Episode: "Down in the Forest" |
| 2002–2003 | Worst Best Friends | Gilbert | 13 Episodes |
| 2003 | The Situation Room | Young John Howard | Australian Short Film |
| 2003 | Darkness Falls | Michael Greene | Lead Actor |
| 2004 | Fergus McPhail | Tim | 1 Episode |
| 2007 | December Boys | Misty | Lead Actor |
| 2010 | Underbelly Files: Tell Them Lucifer was Here | Joseph Debs | TV movie |
| 2011 | The Colour Blue | Pete Cook | Co-Lead alongside Andrew S. Gilbert |
| 2012 | Australia On Trial | Thomas Smith | Supporting Role |
| 2015 | Holding the Man | Eric | |
| 2015 | Downriver | Trav | |
