= Jessica Jacobs =

Australian actress & singer (1990–2008)

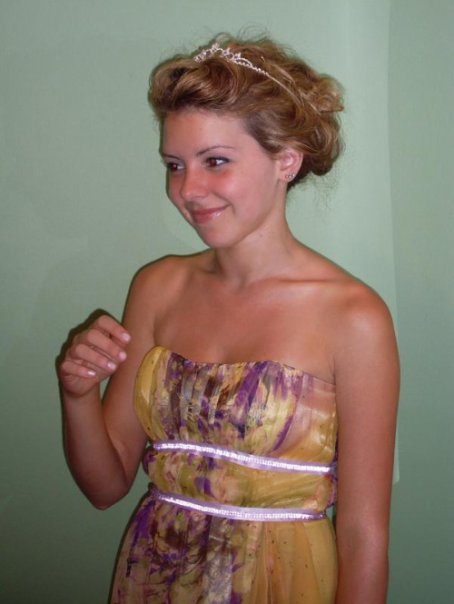
- Born: Jessica Madison Jacobs; 14 November 1990; Canberra, Australia
- Died: 10 May 2008 (aged 17); Cheltenham, Victoria, Australia
- Resting place: St. Kilda Cemetery, St. Kilda, Melbourne, Victoria, Australia
- Education: Sandringham College
- Occupations: Actress, singer
- Known for: Melanie Atwood on The Saddle Club
- Musical career
- Genre: Dance/electronic
- Instruments: Vocals, guitar, violin
- Years active: 1999–2008

Jessica Madison Jacobs (14 November 1990 – 10 May 2008) was an Australian actress and singer. She was best known for her role as Melanie Atwood in the second series of The Saddle Club.

== Biography ==
Born in Canberra, Australia, Jessica Jacobs was the middle child of Joanna and Brendan Jacobs and the sister of Adam, Seth and Charlie Jacobs.

Jacobs began acting at the age of nine. Jacobs appeared as Marta von Trapp in the Melbourne production of the 1999–2000 Australian stage revival tour of The Sound of Music, taking over from Rachel Marley who had played the role in the opening Sydney production. In addition to The Saddle Club, Jacobs was featured in the television series Fergus McPhail, Worst Best Friends, and Holly's Heroes. Jacobs replaced Marisa Siketa on The Saddle Club after she left the show to star on Neighbours. Jessica studied ballet and classical violin when she was six years old. Jacobs eventually learned how to play bass guitar. Until her death she was a member of The Volten Sins. Jacobs and Janelle Corlass-Brown released a CD Single for their song "Trouble" in 2003. Jacobs was in Year 12 at the time of her death. She was six months away from leaving Sandringham College and getting her Victorian Certificate of Education. Jacobs had planned to move in with older brother Adam and attend Victorian College of the Arts to study bass guitar and establish herself as a musician. Jacobs was a Christian (Anglican Church of Australia). In the months before her death Jacobs took a break from acting to focus on school and music. Jacobs had been working at a local bakery until the day she died. Prior to her death, Jacobs was working on music for series three of The Saddle Club. A year after Jacobs' death, her mother, Joanna Jacobs. founded the Jessica Jacobs School of Drama.

== Death ==
On 10 May 2008, Jacobs was walking along the platform at Cheltenham railway station, Melbourne, when she tripped and fell onto the tracks and was fatally hit by a train arriving at the platform. The police took several hours to identify her because Jacobs, who was returning from an overnight stay with a friend, was carrying a fake ID.

Jacobs was buried in St Kilda Cemetery in St Kilda, Victoria.

== Discography ==
=== The Saddle Club discography ===
Albums

- Fun For Everyone (2002) – #45 Australia
- On Top of the World (2003) – #20 Australia
- Friends Forever (2003) – #38 Australia
- Secrets & Dreams (2004) – #49 Australia
- Hello World – The Best Of The Saddle Club (2004)
- Summer With The Saddle Club (2008)
- The Saddle Club – Greatest Hits (2009)
- Grand Gallop – Hello World (2009) – Released in France only.

=== Singles ===
- Trouble (2003)
- Princess Veronica Tour EP (2004)

== Filmography ==
Year	Title	Role	Notes
2002	Worst Best Friends	Molly	2002–2003 (13 episodes)
2003	The Saddle Club	Melanie Atwood	Season 2
2004	Fergus McPhail	Jennifer McPhail	26 episodes
2005	Holly's Heroes	Emily Walsh	25 episodes

== See also ==
- Juanita Coco, an Australian child singer who was killed in an accident whilst still a teenager
- Charlotte Long, an English child actress who was killed in an accident whilst still a teenager
