= Eugénie Sandler P.I. =

Australian television series

- Intertitle
- Created by: David McRobbie
- Starring: Xaris Miller; Matthew Vennell
- Country of origin: Australia
- No. of seasons: 1
- No. of episodes: 13

Production
- Running time: 30 minutes

Original release
- Network: ABC1
- Release: 30 October – 15 November 2000

Eugénie Sandler P.I. is a 13-part Australian children's series that first aired on ABC1 in 2000. The series stars Xaris Miller as the title character.

== Overview ==
Eugénie Sandler is a teenager, worried about the usual things, like her place in the world, who she is, and what it is like to be fifteen. She also worries about her father Ray, who is a private investigator whose job causes frequent changes of address. When her father goes missing one day and she discovers a bomb in her sink, her whole world is turned upside down. With the help of her new friend Warwick, she discovers that her world is not as simple as it seems and that the freedom of a (fictional) country known as Versovia depends on her actions. Along the way, she makes many new friends, saves a lot of lives and discovers that love is not as scary as people think.

== Cast ==
=== Main / regular ===
- Xaris Miller as Eugénie Sandler
- Matthew Vennell as Warwick Bedford
- Brett Climo as Ray Sandler
- Martin Jacobs as Detective Matt Gurny
- Odette Joannides as Detective Teresa Brady
- Saskia Post as Angela Duvier
- Alex Menglet as Davorin
- Jasper Bagg as Slavomir
- Louise Siversen as Winsome Bedford

=== Guests ===
- Clayton Watson as Joska (2 episodes)
- Fletcher Humphrys as Brett (1 episode)
- Gareth Yuen as Lifesaver (1 episode)
- Kerry Armstrong as Sylvia (1 episode)
- Kym Gyngell as Dancer (1 episode)
- Martin Copping as Thargie (1 episode)
- Tony Briggs as Icecream vendor (1 episode)

== Production ==
In late 1999 the Australian Broadcasting Company came up with the idea of a new children's detective show. In early 2000 after many scripts were written and casting had completed, they started filming. The first episode of the 13-part series aired on 30 October 2000.

== Episodes ==
No.	Title	Original release date
1	"Part 1"	30 October 2000
The past is catching up with Ray Sandler and his daughter, Eugénie. Ray goes missing and someone is trying to kill Eugénie, but why?
2	"Part 2"	31 October 2000
Lucky to escape, Eugénie and Warwick are now on the run. However, before they can begin to find Ray, they first must find somewhere safe
3	"Part 3"	1 November 2000
Eugénie and Warwick find a safe place at Alloway House. Ray's friends are eager to help, however they are the ones who really need assistance.
4	"Part 4"	2 November 2000
Eugénie and Warwick are once again on the run. Detective Gurney is getting closer to them. Eugénie goes off in search of a mysterious woman in the photograph, she hopes it will be her mother
5	"Part 5"	3 November 2000
The discovery of the passport and pendant pose more questions than they answer. Hiding at the beach, Eugénie and Warwick trap two thieves, however by doing this Detective Gurney knows their location.
6	"Part 6"	6 November 2000
Eugénie goes to the passport office hoping to find out about her true identity. Gurney tracks her down and he's sure he can kill her.
7	"Part 7"	7 November 2000
Warwick's parents arrive home so it is then time for Eugénie to move on. Everyone is looking for her, her father, Detective Gurney, Detective Brady, Slavomir and Davorim.Will she be able to stay undetected
8	"Part 8"	8 November 2000
Eugénie manages to escape from the Versovians. With Warwick in hospital and her fathers location still unknown, she has to trust someone, so she comes clean to Detective Teresa Brady
9	"Part 9"	9 November 2000
Eugénie and Warwick head to Haven Lodge looking for Ray and Detective Matt Gurney is on the run.
10	"Part 10"	10 November 2000
Ray tells Eugénie everything, he is not her father.He still loves Eugénie as his own. For Eugénie everything is now different. Ray's explanation just poses more questions about her life
11	"Part 11"	13 November 2000
While Eugénie is trying to adapt to the idea that Angela is her real mother, Ray is being held hostage by Matt Gurney.
12	"Part 12"	14 November 2000
Eugénie now knows that she is a princess and Angela is really her mother . She decides to go along with the lie she is Angela's daughter to find out what the Versovians have planned for her
13	"Part 13"	15 November 2000
Everyone thinks Eugénie's plan to trap Matt Gurney is too dangerous, however she is determined to make him pay. The Versovians put their plan in action.

== Awards ==
=== AFI Awards ===
Year	Result	Category	Awarded to
2000	Won	Best Children's Television Drama; Margot McDonald	
2000	Nominated	Best Children's Television Drama; Margot Mcdonald	
