= December Boys =

- US theatrical release poster
- Directed by: Rod Hardy
- Screenplay by: Marc Rosenberg
- Story by: Ronald Kinnoch
- Based on: December Boys by Michael Noonan
- Produced by: Richard Becker
- Starring: Daniel Radcliffe; Lee Cormie; Jack Thompson; Victoria Hill; Teresa Palmer
- Cinematography: David Connell
- Edited by: Dany Cooper
- Music by: Carlo Giacco
- Production company: Village Roadshow Pictures
- Distributed by: Becker Entertainment; Roadshow Films
- Release dates: 14 September 2007 (UK, US); 20 September 2007 (Australia)
- Running time: 105 minutes
- Country: Australia
- Language: English
- Budget: $4 million
- Box office: $1.2 million

December Boys is a 2007 Australian drama film directed by Rod Hardy and written by Marc Rosenberg and adapted from the 1963 novel of the same name by Michael Noonan. It was released on 14 September 2007 in the United Kingdom and the United States and 20 September 2007 in Australia. The film follows four orphan boys who compete to be adopted by a family. This was Daniel Radcliffe's first non-Harry Potter film role since his film debut in The Tailor of Panama.

== Plot ==
In late 1960s Australia, four orphan boys from a Roman Catholic orphanage in the outback of Australia – Maps, Misti, Spark and Spit – were all born in the month of December, and for their birthday, they are sent on a holiday to the beach to stay with Mr. and Mrs. McAnsh. While there, they meet Fearless, a man who claims to be the risk motorbike rider in the nearby carnival, and his wife, Teresa. Misti, Spark and Spit instantly become closer to Teresa, but Maps, eldest of the four, is still reluctant to talk to her. He instead finds more fun in spending time with an older teenage girl named Lucy, who had come to the beach to stay with her uncle. He often goes up to a place with strange rocks, and meets her there.

A few days later, the orphans peek through a window in Fearless' house to see Teresa undressing, but Misti, being the most religious of the four, throws a rock at the wall to make them go away. Misti runs back to Mr. McAnsh's house and looks through the small opening of a door to see someone in the shower, only to find that it is the sickly Mrs. McAnsh. They soon discover that she has breast cancer.

One night, Misti overhears Fearless talking to his friends about the possibility of adopting one of the orphans. Excited about the opportunity to finally have parents, he keeps it to himself until he decides to reveal it to a priest who has driven to the beach for the orphans' confessions. The other boys realise that he is taking too long, and once he is finished, they force it out of him with the threat of Spit spitting on him while he is pinned to the ground. Misti, Spark and Spit are eager to compete for the love of the seemingly perfect Fearless and Teresa, but Maps is less than excited, even saying to Lucy, "What's the big deal about parents, anyway?" Maps experiences his first kiss with Lucy, and soon loses his virginity to her in one of the caves of the Remarkable Rocks.

There, she tells him to promise that he will always remember her as his first. The next day, he goes up to the Remarkable Rocks, only to find Lucy is not there. Her uncle tells him that she has left the beach to return to her father, and will likely not be back until next summer. Heartbroken, he goes to the carnival to find Fearless and talk to him, but discovers that he is not a motorbike rider at all, instead employed to clean up after the animals. Furious that Fearless had lied all along, Maps finds a painting made by Misti of him as the son of Fearless and Teresa, and destroys it. Misti attacks him and hits him with the fragments of the painting's frame, and the bond between the four orphans is broken.

Fearless finds Maps in the cave of the Remarkable Rocks, and explains to him what had really happened. It is revealed to that Fearless was formerly a bike rider, and did all of his stunts with Teresa riding on the back of the bike. There was an accident that kept Teresa in the hospital for almost a year, leaving her unable to have children. This was the reason they had wanted to adopt one of the orphans.

Maps returns to the beach and finds out from Spark and Spit that Misti has gone into the water, and is drowning. Maps goes in after him despite the fact that he cannot swim. Both he and Misti nearly drown. Underwater, they open their eyes to see a vision of the Virgin Mary, possibly meaning that they are dying. Before they can reach out to it, the two boys are grabbed by Fearless and brought back to the shore. Maps and Misti reconcile with each other and the four are friends again.

The next day, the boys are called to Fearless and Teresa's house for an announcement. There, they reveal the couple is going to adopt Misti. He takes leave of his friends and he watches on the front porch with Fearless and Teresa as the other three orphans walk away and begin playing on the rocks down the beach. Misti realizes that they are his true family, and asks Fearless and Teresa if he can stay with them instead. They accept, and he returns home with the orphans.

Many decades later, Misti, as an old man, drives to the same beach along with the ashes of Maps, who had recently died while working as a priest in Africa helping refugees; and Lucy's ring that she gave to Maps on that holiday long ago. He meets up with Spark and Spit, and they toss the ashes and ring into the wind from the hill above the beach, remembering Maps and their time there, with a cheer to "The December Boys."

== Cast ==
- Daniel Radcliffe as Maps (James)
- Lee Cormie as Misti (Vernon)
- Christian Byers as Spark (Donald)
- James Fraser as Spit (Bruce)
- Jack Thompson as Bandy McAnsh
- Teresa Palmer as Lucy
- Sullivan Stapleton as Fearless
- Victoria Hill as Teresa
- Kris McQuade as Mrs. McAnsh
- Ralph Cotterill as Shellback
- Frank Gallacher as Father Scully
- Paul Blackwell as Watson
- Judi Farr as Reverend Mother

== Production ==
The film was shot on location in Yankalilla, and Kangaroo Island, South Australia.

Freddie Highmore was considered for the role of Maps, but was replaced by Radcliffe because he would not leave the United Kingdom, as he wanted to be with his sick grandmother.

== Critical reception ==
On the review aggregator website Rotten Tomatoes, 41% of 70 critics' reviews are positive, with an average rating of 5/10. The website's consensus reads: "December Boys' location and settings are invitingly gorgeous, but the coming-of-age drama that takes place on them is uneventful and far too sentimental." Metacritic, which uses a weighted average, assigned the film a score of 56 out of 100, based on 21 critics, indicating "mixed or average" reviews.

== Box office ==
December Boys grossed $633,606 at the box office in Australia. Several newspapers remarked that the film was a commercial bomb due to its relatively large distribution and advertisements versus its small box office return.

== See also ==
- Cinema of Australia
- South Australian Film Corporation
