= 600 Bottles of Wine =

600 Bottles of Wine is an Australian television drama series screening on Network Ten's Eleven in 2018. The series is written by and stars Grace Rouvray. It first screened as a web series in 2017. It is produced by Bec Bignell and Marius Foley’s Cockatoo Co.Lab and directed by Ainslie Clouston.

== Plot ==
600 Bottles of Wine follows the story of Claire, who begins dating again after breaking up with her long term boyfriend. When she makes a connection with a one-night-stand Pat, she looks to her friends for advice on where she stands in the relationship. The series looks at the anti relationship, what dating is really like in an era where no-one says what they mean or what they want.

== Cast and characters ==
- Grace Rouvray as Claire
- Nerida Bronwen as Nat
- Angus McLaren as Pat
- Nancy Denis as Timmie
- Stephanie Baine as Harriet
- Adam Franklin as Liam
- Gregory Dias as Melvin
- Lara Dignam as Katie
- Zenia Starr as Olivia
- Elizabeth McLean as Libby
- Andrew Shaw as Huw
- Ryan Madden as Nick

== Episodes ==
- S1, Ep1 - The Break up
- S1, Ep2 - The Morning After
- S1, Ep3 - The Negroni
- S1, Ep4 - The Umbrella
- S1, Ep5 - The Test
- S1, Ep6 - The Conversation
- S1, Ep7 - The Friend
- S1, Ep8 - The Colleague

== International ==
The series has screened in the UK on BBC Three, in New Zealand on TVNZ's on-demand service and YLE, the Finnish Public Broadcaster. In July 2020 the series was added to Netflix in Australia and New Zealand. It is currently streaming in Canada on CBC Gem.
