= Worst Best Friends =

Australian children's television series

- Written by: Max Dann; Lisa Chambers
- Directed by: Kate Woods; Arnie Custo; Steve Jodrell
- Starring: Cameron Attard; Seychelle Brown; Lee Cormie; Raymond Mirams; Andrew S. Gilbert; Christen O'Leary; Jessica Jacobs; Joshua Jay; Rebecca Hetherington; Andrew "Milton" Hobbs; Jan Friedl; Arunabha Keshari; Rebekah Tipping; Nadja Kostich; Amy Latimer; Angus McLaren; Justin B. Knight; Sara Weinstein
- Country of origin: Australia
- Original language: English
- No. of series: 1
- No. of episodes: 13

Production
- Executive producers: Andrea Denholm; Deb Cox; Andrew Knight
- Producer: Sue Seeary
- Running time: 30 minutes
- Production company: CoxKnight Production

Original release
- Network: Network Ten
- Release: 9 November 2002 – 1 February 2003

Worst Best Friends is an Australian children's television series first screened on Network Ten in 2002. The series is based on the children's books by Max Dann: Adventures with My Worst Best Friend, Going Bananas and Dusting in Love.

== Plot summary ==
Roger Thesaurus has a problem. His two best friends are worst enemies. Dusting, who is rough and disgusting has forced his way to become Roger's best friend but Roger already had a best friend, Millicent, who is bossy. The two best friends constantly fight for Roger's attention, while he copes with parents who have decided to separate.

KEY AWARDS AND FESTIVAL SCREENINGS:Banff World Television Festival (2003)and nominated for a BANFF and Screen Producers Association of Australia (2003) and nominated for an AFI Award (Best Children's Television Drama 2003)

== Cast list ==
- Cameron Attard as Roger Thesaurus
- Seychelle Brown as Millicent
- Raymond Mirams as Ernest Dusting
- Lee Cormie as Gilbert
- Andrew S. Gilbert as Mr Thesaurus
- Christen O'Leary as Mrs Thesaurus
- Jessica Jacobs as Molly
- Joshua Jay as Max
- Masih. A as Trevor
- Rebecca Hetherington as Avril
- Andrew "Milton" Hobbs as himself
- Jan Friedl as Miss Hodgson
- Arunabha Keshari as Kay
- Rebekah Tipping as Loretta
- Nadja Kostich as Avril's Mother
- Amy Latimer as Phoebe
- Angus McLaren as Eddie
- Maxwell Simon as Douglas Grotty
- Justin B. Knight as himself
- Sara Weinstein
- Andrew "Milton" Hobbs as himself

== Episodes ==
No. in season	Title	Directed by	Written by	Original release date
1	"The Excursion"	Kate Woods	Max Dann	9 November 2002
On a school excursion to the Sparkling Star Bottle works, Millicent and Dusting become trapped and are convinced that aliens have abducted Thesaurus. When Thesaurus eventually saves the day, the bottling works gives Dusting and Thesaurus free bottles of soft drink.
2	"Kiss of Millicent"	Kate Woods	Max Dann	16 November 2002
When Dusting is cast as Don Giovanno in the school play, he swaps the part with Gilbert. There's no way he's going to kiss Millicent in the performance! But things go wrong when Gilbert gets an asthma attack on the night of the play.
3	"My Twin Rabbit"	Kate Woods	Max Dann	23 November 2002
It's Help a Needy Person Week and Millicent, convinced that Dusting is poor, is determined to help him whether he likes it or not! But when Thesaurus sleeps over at Dusting's, he discovers that Dusting's family is far from poor.
4	"Fancy Rugs From India"	Kate Woods	Max Dann	30 November 2002
When Dusting's Aunt Ivy comes to town and Thesaurus' mum forgets to cook him dinner, the two boys decide to sail away to Africa. But when Roger tells Dusting a ghost story on the first night, Dusting gets scared and deserts Thesaurus.
5	"Eddie's Undies"	Arnie Custo	Max Dann	7 November 2002
Dusting's position as school bully is threatened when Eddie arrives at school — he's big, he's tough… and he eats bugs! When Eddie threatens Millicent's pet tortoise, Millicent convinces Thesaurus and Dusting to teach Eddie a lesson — a lesson involving Eddie's underpants and a flagpole!
6	"In The Pink"	Arnie Custo	Max Dann	14 November 2002
Thesaurus' life is turned upside down when Dusting and his Mexican walking fish decide to move in for a few days. When Millicent paints Thesaurus' room pink to drive Dusting out, Thesaurus is once again caught in the middle between his two worst best friends.
7	"The Motel"	Arnie Custo	Max Dann	21 November 2002
While Thesaurus' Dad takes him on a holiday to the local motel, Avril is convinced that the new P.E. teacher Mr Collins is about to propose to her. In an effort to win Avril away from Mr Collins, Gilbert pretends to be French and challenges the teacher.
8	"Moroccan Chicken"	Arnie Custo	Max Dann	28 November 2002
In an attempt to keep Thesaurus' parents from breaking up and taking him to Brazil, Millicent and Dusting team up to cook Mr and Mrs Thesaurus a romantic meal. But things don't go as planned when Millicent and Dusting fight.
9	"Better Than Glen"	Steve Jodrell	Max Dann	4 January 2003
It's election time for Class Captain. Millicent backs Glen Appealing while Thesaurus backs Dusting. But when Glen shows more interest in swimming than the election and Dusting is caught cheating, it's Thesaurus who ends up becoming Class Captain.
10	"Miss Personality"	Steve Jodrell	Max Dann	11 January 2003
When Thesaurus finally tells Millicent what he really thinks about her, Millicent conducts a poll at school to prove that she really is a good person. Dusting reminds everyone of Millicent's bad points and Millicent is devastated when her friends tell her what they really think of her.
11	"Single White Avril"	Steve Jodrell	Max Dann	18 January 2003
Millicent decides to stay in bed until everyone at school apologises for being mean to her. But her decision has dire and unplanned consequences as Avril tries to take over Millicent's position at school! Dusting tries to save Chewbarker from Molly.
12	"The Chosen One"	Steve Jodrell	Max Dann	25 January 2003
In exchange for a rabbit, Molly offers to help prove to Max that he is not adopted. Meanwhile, Thesaurus' dad and Avril's mum hook up together and Thesaurus is forced to sleep in Avril's laundry.
13	"Died a Horse"	Steve Jodrell	Max Dann	1 February 2003
Dusting cons Thesaurus into going to the school fancy dress party in the rear end of Dusting's horse costume. But when Thesaurus sprains his ankle, it's Dusting who gets the nasty surprise — he'll have to dance with Millicent.

== See also ==
- List of Australian television series
