= Andrew Shaw (rugby union) =

- Born: 2 February 1989 (age 37) Brisbane, Australia
- Height: 189 cm (6 ft 2 in)
- Weight: 109 kg (240 lb)
- Notable relative: Tony Shaw (father)
- Occupation: Actor / Filmmaker

Rugby union career
- Position: Flanker
Super Rugby
Years	Team	Apps	(Points)
2009–10	Reds	4	(0)

Andrew Shaw (born 2 February 1989) is an Australian actor and former professional rugby union player.

Shaw is the son of former Wallabies captain Tony Shaw.

A flanker, Shaw played for Brisbane club Brothers and played two seasons in the Super 14 with the Queensland Reds, debuting against the Crusaders in Christchurch, opposite Richie McCaw at openside flanker.

Shaw is now an actor and had a lead role in the 2022 Liam Neeson film Blacklight.

== Filmography ==
=== Film ===
Year	Title	Role
2022	Blacklight	Jordan Lockhart

=== Television ===
Year	Title	Role	Notes
2016	Hamish from the Northern Beaches	Kayne	1 episode (Mini Series)
2017	600 Bottles of Wine	Huw	1 episode
2017	The Secret Daughter	Hot Guy	1 episode
2018	Resting Pitch Face	Man-Bun	3 episodes
2018	Home and Away	Matt 'Spider' Sullivan	1 episode
2018	Bite Club	Vincent Stathlakos	1 episode (Mini Series)
2019	Les Norton	Muscles	1 episode (Mini Series)
2020	Bondi Slayer	Dylan	1 episode
2021	RFDS	Xavier	1 episode
2023	NCIS: Sydney	Stone	1 episode
2024	Nautilus	Jiacomo	Main cast
