= Darkness Falls (2003 film) =

Film by Jonathan Liebesman

- Theatrical release poster
- Directed by: Jonathan Liebesman
- Screenplay by: Joe Harris; James Vanderbilt; John Fasano
- Story by: Joe Harris
- Based on: Tooth Fairy by Joe Harris
- Produced by: John Fasano; John Hegeman; William Sherak; Jason Shuman
- Starring: Chaney Kley; Emma Caulfield
- Cinematography: Dan Laustsen
- Edited by: Timothy Alverson; Steve Mirkovich
- Music by: Brian Tyler
- Production companies: Columbia Pictures; Revolution Studios; Distant Corners
- Distributed by: Sony Pictures Releasing
- Release dates: January 24, 2003 (U.S.); August 28, 2003 (Australia)
- Running time: 86 minutes
- Countries: United States; Australia
- Language: English
- Budget: $11 million
- Box office: $47.5 million

Darkness Falls is a 2003 supernatural horror film directed by Jonathan Liebesman, in his feature directorial debut. The script was written by Joe Harris, James Vanderbilt and John Fasano. It is an international co-production between the United States and Australia. Chaney Kley and Emma Caulfield are featured actors, with supporting performances from Sullivan Stapleton, Emily Browning, Lee Cormie, Grant Piro, Kestie Morassi, and Angus Sampson.

The film follows a boy who witnessed his mother's murder by a vengeful spirit which had haunted his Maine hometown of Darkness Falls for over a century. Twelve years later, he returns to the town after the spirit begins haunting those he cares about.

Adapted from Harris's 2001 short film Tooth Fairy, Darkness Falls it was shot primarily in Melbourne and Sydney, Australia in November 2001, with additional photography taking place in Maine.

Released on January 24, 2003, by Sony Pictures Releasing, Darkness Falls performed well at the North American box office, grossing $47.5 million against a budget of $11 million. It was released theatrically in Australia on August 28, 2003. The film received overwhelmingly unfavorable reviews from film critics, though it has gone on to develop a small cult following in the years since its original release. It inspired several related works, including a novelization by Keith DeCandido, a faux documentary, and a comic book prequel written by Harris and published by Dark Horse Comics.

== Plot ==
In the middle of the 19th century, in the town of Darkness Falls, Maine, elderly widow Matilda Dixon was adored by the town's children. She would give them a gold coin whenever they lost a tooth, earning her the nickname Tooth Fairy. One night, a fire broke out in her house and left her face disfigured and severely sensitive to light. She wore a white porcelain mask and would only leave her house at night. However, the town's adults were suspicious of Matilda, believing her to be a witch. When two children went missing, the town quickly turned on Matilda. They tore off her mask, exposed her face to light and hanged her. Before her death, Matilda placed a curse on the town and swore revenge. "What I gave before in kindness, I will take forever in revenge". When the two missing children returned home unharmed, the town realized their mistake and quickly buried Matilda's body, keeping their deed a secret. Over the next 150 years, the story of Matilda became the legend of the Tooth Fairy. Her spirit visits children on the night they lose their last baby tooth. If anyone lays eyes upon her, they will face her curse and be killed.

In 1990, Kyle Walsh loses his last baby tooth. That night, he wakes after a horrific nightmare and senses Matilda's presence, discovering that the story is true. Knowing that she cannot bear the light, he shines a flashlight into her face and flees, hiding in the brightly lit bathroom. His mother tries to reassure him that there is nobody else in the house, but is killed after seeing Matilda in Kyle's room. The next morning, police arrive and Kyle is removed to a psychiatric institution after mistaken speculations that he killed his mother.

12 years later, Caitlin Greene, an old friend from school, telephones Kyle to ask for his help with her younger brother Michael, who refuses to sleep in the dark. Kyle still suffers extreme paranoia from his encounter with Matilda. He has dozens of flashlights and numerous medications for anxiety, depression and sleep disorders. Kyle visits Michael at the hospital but denies any relation to his condition and walks away from Caitlin. She still believes that the legend of Matilda Dixon is just a story, one which they were all told as children but a story nonetheless.

Kyle tries to warn others of Matilda but faces ridicule and skepticism which leads to the death of many townspeople for not believing him. A lightning storm blacks out the whole town. Realizing that Michael and Caitlin are in danger, Kyle rushes to the hospital. He rescues them and gains allies along the way, as others see Matilda and realize the story is true. Kyle, Michael and Caitlin flee and hide in the lighthouse. They are helped by several medical personnel and a police officer, all of whom are killed by Matilda.

During his final confrontation with Matilda, the power is restored and the lighthouse beacon is activated. The sudden exposure to light causes Matilda excruciating pain and Kyle tears off her mask. He realizes that she's now vulnerable after seeing her grotesque, disfigured face. Enraged, she resumes her attack. Kyle sets his right sleeve on fire and he strikes her face with it. As her spirit is engulfed in flames, Matilda is completely destroyed and her curse is finally brought to an end.

In a final scene, a young boy is being tucked into bed by his parents, having just lost his last baby tooth. As he sleeps, his mother replaces the tooth under his pillow with some gold coins.

== Cast ==
- Chaney Kley as Kyle Walsh
  - Joshua Anderson as Young Kyle Walsh
    - Jacob Worrall as Body double for Young Kyle Walsh
- Emma Caulfield as Caitlin Greene
  - Emily Browning as Young Caitlin Greene
- Lee Cormie as Michael Greene
- Grant Piro as Larry Fleishman
- John Stanton as Captain Thomas Henry
- Sullivan Stapleton as Officer Matt Henry
- Steve Mouzakis as Dr. Peter Murphy
- Peter Curtin as Dr. Travis
- Kestie Morassi as Nurse Lauren
- Jenny Lovell as Nurse Alexandra
- Antony Burrows as Matilda Dixon
  - Gary A. Hecker voices Matilda Dixon's vocal effects
- Korie Ferguson as Mrs. Watkins
- Rebecca McCauley as Margaret Walsh
- Angus Sampson as Raymond 'Ray' Winchester ("The Drinking Buddy")

== Production ==
=== Development ===
In September 2001, the film was announced as having entered development under the working titles of Don't Peek and The Tooth Fairy as the first production of the Revolution Studios based Distant Corners Entertainment Group, which itself was expanded from a 2001 short film Tooth Fairy written and directed by Joe Harris.

=== Filming ===
Filming was slated to begin in November 2001 with production in Australia on a $6–8 million budget. Jonathan Liebesman was announced as director in what would be his debut feature. Producer John Hegeman, who was behind the marketing of The Blair Witch Project, voiced his hopes that the film would be the first in a wide reaching franchise. Principal photography occurred in Sydney, New South Wales as well as Yarraville and Melbourne, Victoria. Some additional photography took place in Maine in the United States, where the film is set.

=== Special effects ===
Special effects for Matilda Dixon's appearance underwent significant changes during production and after. Steve Wang, who had previously completed special effects for Predator (1987), was initially enlisted to design Matilda's appearance, creating a "winged and toothy" creature with actor Doug Jones performing the role in prosthetics. Early test screenings of this design were deemed unsatisfactory by the production and Wang's design was ultimately scrapped, after which Stan Winston and Aaron Sims were hired to create an alternate design of Dixon.

The final design, a life-size puppet as seen in the finished film, is entirely Winston and Sims's creation. Despite this, Wang's original design for Dixon was used as the model for an action figure created by McFarlane Toys, released in September 2002 as "The Tooth Fairy." Due to the change in creature design during production, actress Emma Caulfield recalled that, during her scenes with the antagonist, she was often reacting to "nothing at all," as shots of Dixon were completed without the cast.

=== Post-production ===
Initially, the film was to have established Kyle Walsh as more explicitly troubled while keeping the actual existence of the Tooth Fairy vague and undefined in order to make audiences question whether Kyle was in fact the actual killer. Matilda Dixon was also established as being a younger widow with a husband who was lost at sea rather than an older woman as depicted in the final film. After completion, the producers heavily truncated the final cut removing character backstory as well as expanded details on the Darkness Falls curse and made the film much more upfront and explicit with the Tooth Fairy as the main antagonist rather than any suggestion that Kyle could be the villain.

== Music ==
Darkness Falls: Original Motion Picture Soundtrack

Film score (Digital download / Audio CD) by Brian Tyler
- Released: March 4, 2003
- Genre: Film score
- Length: 48:32
- Label: Varèse Sarabande

The film's closing credits feature the song "Gunboat" by Vixtrola. Other songs featured in the film include "Look Out Below" by Closure, "Hand of Emptiness" by Brian Tichy, and "Rock Nation" by Scott Nickoley and Jamie Dunlap.

All music is composed by Brian Tyler.

Darkness Falls: Original Motion Picture Soundtrack
No.	Title	Length
1.	"Evil Rises"	2:26
2.	"Darkness Falls"	2:33
3.	"Eye Contact"	1:50
4.	"Interrogatorio"	2:13
5.	"A Bit Crispy"	1:22
6.	"25 Words or Less"	1:41
7.	"Stay in the Light"	1:22
8.	"Lose a Tooth"	1:31
9.	"Der Zylinder"	2:58
10.	"One Kiss"	1:57
11.	"Let There Be Light Sort Of"	1:08
12.	"We Are Safe In Here"	0:37
13.	"We Are Not Safe In Here"	0:43
14.	"Aftermath"	1:29
15.	"Overhead"	0:57
16.	"Consultation"	2:12
17.	"Utter Darkness"	1:28
18.	"That Has Got To Hurt"	1:25
19.	"Kyle and Michael"	2:30
20.	"Perception Tank"	1:39
21.	"Blood Red Herring"	0:44
22.	"Meet the Tooth Fairy"	2:49
23.	"Reading the Legend"	0:44
24.	"Is This Kyle Walsh?"	1:53
25.	"The Mask"	1:03
26.	"End Titles"	7:07
Total length:		48:32

== Release ==
Darkness Falls premiered in the United States on January 24, 2003, through Sony Pictures Releasing. The film was released in Australia later that year, on August 28, 2003.

=== Marketing ===
Producer John Hegeman, who had helped design the highly-successful marketing campaign for The Blair Witch Project (1999), produced a faux documentary titled The Legend of Matilda Dixon, a tactic similarly employed with that film (a faux documentary titled The Curse of Blair Witch had also been made to bolster its reputation as being based on real events).

=== Home media ===
Columbia TriStar Home Entertainment released a special edition DVD on April 29, 2003. A Blu-ray edition was released in North America by Image Entertainment on October 11, 2018.

== Reception ==
=== Box office ===
Darkness Falls debuted at number one its opening weekend in the United States, opening across 2,837 theaters. The film grossed $32,551,396 in North America and an additional $14,937,140 internationally. With a worldwide gross of $47,488,536, Darkness Falls was considered a commercial success, recouping its $11 million budget.

=== Critical response ===
On the review aggregator website Rotten Tomatoes, 10% of 131 critics' reviews are positive, with an average rating of 3.3/10. The website's consensus reads: "A derivative movie where the scares are few and things don't make much sense." Metacritic, which uses a weighted average, assigned the film a score of 23 out of 100, based on 27 critics, indicating "generally unfavorable" reviews. Audiences polled by CinemaScore gave the film an average grade of "B−" on an A+ to F scale.

In his review for The New York Times, Stephen Holden gave the film a favorable review, calling it "an efficient little horror movie that doesn't waste its time getting down to business." Although the film had a "deliberate sparseness of gore," Holden noted the "demonization of a benign childhood phantom" as the film's "cleverest notion." The Portland Mercury's Andrew Wright also wrote favorably of the film, conceding: "Darkness Falls may lack the relentless, resonating shiver quality that marks an indelible horror classic, but it provides for more than acceptable campfire fare (although at under 80 minutes, it lasts less than most Duralogs), with occasional moments of genuine visceral fright." Jamie Russell of the BBC awarded it three out of five stars, writing: "This is a self-consciously silly, completely disposable multiplex movie that does its best to deliver its fair share of chills while struggling to keep a straight face." Alexander Walker of the Evening Standard wrote: "Bogey-fanciers may enjoy it; others may want to check out long before they all take refuge in the lighthouse."

Kevin Thomas of the Los Angeles Times gave the film a mixed review, noting that although "the filmmakers and their cast strive mightily to work up some thrills and chills," the film ultimately was "not all that scary." Philip French of The Observer found the film to be a derivative "mish mash of horror-movie clichés,"

The Sydney Morning Herald panned the film, noting: "The characters are empty, the performances wooden, and of course, the grave little kid is omniscient. The backstory is the most vibrant part of this tedious film. One wonders why the filmmakers didn't make a whole film out of the Matilda Dixon backstory, until one realises it's been done." The Washington Post's Desson Howe was also unimpressed by the film, describing it as a "loud scareflick that relies entirely on cheap boo! effects to convey its atmosphere. Director Jonathan Liebesman and the three credited "writers" all deserve the symbolic equivalent of a noose for their unimaginative handling of sustained menace." Bruce Fretts of Entertainment Weekly was also critical of the film's loud sound design and use of jump scares, while describing the screenplay as "like something salvaged from Stephen King’s wastebasket." Adam Smith, writing for Empire, similarly remarked the film's lack of suspense, awarding it one out of five stars.

Writing of the film in his 2023 book Horror Films of 2000–2009, critic John Kenneth Muir notes: "Darkness Falls features a great, creepy villain, and a strong sound design. Beyond those accomplishments, however, it is a film that features a familiar plot, lacks a second act, and is, ultimately, a genre picture that can't stand up to scrutiny."

== Novelizations ==
Keith R. A. DeCandido wrote a novelization of the film, which was published by Pocket Books in December 2002. DeCandido's novelization more closely follows the film's original screenplay, and features plot points that were not included in the finished film.

On January 2, 2003, a prequel comic, Darkness Falls: The Tragic Life of Matilda Dixon, written by Joe Harris, was released by the Oregon-based publisher Dark Horse Comics.

== See also ==
- List of ghost films
- Tooth fairy
- Night terror
- They, a 2002 horror film with a similar premise to this film.

== Sources ==
- Muir, John Kenneth (2023). Horror Films of 2000–2009. Jefferson, North Carolina: McFarland & Company. ISBN 978-1-476-64450-9.
- Shelley, Peter (2012). Australian Horror Films, 1973-2010. Jefferson, North Carolina: McFarland & Company. ISBN 978-0-786-46167-7.
