= Chaney Kley =

American actor (1972–2007)

- Born: Chaney Kley Minnis; August 20, 1972; Manassas, Virginia, U.S.
- Died: July 24, 2007 (aged 34); Los Angeles, California, U.S.
- Education: University of Colorado Boulder
- Occupation: Actor
- Website: chaneykley.net (defunct)

Chaney Kley Minnis (August 20, 1972 – July 24, 2007) was an American actor. During his career he was best known for his recurring role as Officer Asher on the FX drama The Shield and as the lead in the horror movie Darkness Falls.

== Early life ==
Chaney Kley Minnis was born August 20, 1972, in Manassas, Virginia, and raised in Denver, Colorado. He attended Denver's Thomas Jefferson High School, and the University of Colorado Boulder, where he earned a BFA in drama. After graduating from college, Kley relocated to Chicago where he began working as a stage actor. Kley starred in a 1998 Chicago Dramatists' production of The Angels of Lemnos, for which he won a Joseph Jefferson Award for Best Actor.

== Career ==
Chaney Kley Minnis earned critical notice in the Chicago Dramatists' 1998 production of The Angels of Lemnos, delivering one of the “richly layered performances” among “great Equity and non‑Equity actors” as lauded by the Chicago Reader. His portrayal garnered him the Joseph Jefferson Award for Best Actor in a Principal Role, solidifying his reputation in Chicago's theatre community.

Chaney first appeared on the television series, Buffy the Vampire Slayer, appearing on the episode "Real Me". In 2001, he made his film debut portraying Brandon in Legally Blonde.

In 2003, Kley starred as Kyle Walsh in Darkness Falls, a supernatural horror film that follows a man confronting the ghostly entity that haunted his childhood. The film debuted at #1 at the U.S. box office, earning $12.5 million in its opening weekend and over $47 million worldwide. Though critically mixed, the film developed a cult following, with Kley's performance often noted by fans for bringing emotional weight to the role.

He then later appeared on NCIS, Cold Case, CSI: Crime Scene Investigation, as well as Las Vegas. His last role was in the film One Way To Valhalla (2009), which was released two years after his death.

== Death ==
Kley died on July 24, 2007, in Venice, Los Angeles and was later buried in Denver, Colorado.

== Filmography ==
=== Film ===
| Year | Title | Role | Notes |
|---|---|---|---|
| 2001 | Legally Blonde | Brandon | |
| 2003 | The Skin Horse | John Young | |
| 2003 | Darkness Falls | Kyle Walsh | |
| 2005 | Gotham Café | Steve Davis | |
| 2006 | Jimmy and Judy | Dinko | |
| 2007 | Mr. Blue Sky | Greg Adams | |
| 2009 | One Way to Valhalla | Danny | Released posthumously |

=== Television ===
| Year | Title | Role | Notes |
|---|---|---|---|
| 2000 | Buffy the Vampire Slayer | Brad Connick | Episode: "Real Me" |
| 2003 | Navy NCIS: Naval Criminal Investigative Service | Corporal Paul Brinkman | Episode: "Hung Out to Dry" |
| 2003–2005 | The Shield | Officer Asher | Recurring role (seasons 4–7) |
| 2005 | Cold Case | Billy Johns (1963) | Episode: "Strange Fruit" |
| 2006 | CSI: Crime Scene Investigation | Brent Martin | Episode: "Werewolves" |
| 2006 | Las Vegas | FBI Agent Kent | Episode: "Lyle & Substance" |
