= Mandragora (novel) =

1991 novel by David McRobbie

- Author: David McRobbie
- Language: English
- Genre: Fantasy
- Publisher: Mammoth
- Publication date: 1991
- Publication place: Australia
- Media type: Print (Paperback & Hardback)
- Pages: 244pp (first edition)
- ISBN: 0749712651

Mandragora (1991) is a young adult fantasy novel by Australian author David McRobbie.

== Plot summary ==
deals with the sinking of a sailing ship. Dunarling. Adam Hardy and Catriona Chisholm accidentally find a cache of five small dolls made from mandrake roots. The dolls were left in a hole a hundred years earlier by two other teenagers, Jamie and Margaret, who had survived the wreck of the Dunarling.

Transcribing a diary from that same fatal voyage, Adam and Catriona learn of the cursed mandrake roots, whose power destroyed the Dunarling in 1886. It seems the curses are working again in the town of Dunarling today.

The book has an end piece with historical details of the real mandrake dolls together with a discussion of shipwrecks of the late 19th century.

== Critical reception ==
Adele Walsh, writing on the Kill Your Darlings website noted: "With today’s YA market saturated by the paranormal, the notion of possessed mandrake dolls might sound a touch underwhelming, but they aren't. There is a pervading sense of danger as people are possessed; buildings burn and the young lovers (past and present) suffer the wrath of a wronged woman and the tools of her dissent...McRobbie has crafted characters that endear and repulse. He utilises language from the 1880s to craft character and generate misunderstanding; those possessed speak with a Scottish tongue amidst the chaotic yet meticulous movements of the plot. "

== Awards ==
- Children's Book of the Year Award: Older Readers, 1992, shortlisted
