= Michael Noonan (Australian writer) =

Australian-New Zealand writer (1921–2000)

- Born: Michael John Noonan; 19 September 1921; Sumner, New Zealand
- Died: 5 March 2000 (aged 78); Queensland, Australia
- Writing career
- Language: English
- Genres: Fiction; radio; screenwriting; television

Michael John Noonan OAM (19 September 1921, in Sumner, near Christchurch, New Zealand – 5 March 2000, in Brisbane) was an Australian / New Zealand novelist and radio script writer. He also created the Australian TV series Riptide.

Noonan served with the Second Australian Imperial Force in New Guinea during World War II. He moved to England in 1957 but returned frequently to Australia and returned there to live in Brisbane in 1979.

Noonan was awarded the Medal of the Order of Australia (OAM) in the 1998 Australia Day Honours for "service to the arts as an author of numerous novels, works of non-fiction, television scripts and plays".

The beach, his favourite place, inspired most of his books. He spent the last years of his life living in Queensland, Australia. IN 1993 he married Jan Pearce (d. 2010).

== Works ==
- 1946: In the land of the talking trees: a fantasy
- 1947: The golden forest: the story of Oonah the platypus
- 1959: The patchwork hero (translated into Polish and German)
- 1961-1969: The Flying Doctor Series:
  - 1961: Flying Doctor (also translated into German, French, Dutch, Portuguese)
  - 1962: Flying Doctor and the secret of the pearls (translated into German)
  - 1962: Flying doctor on the Great Barrier Reef (translated into German and Polish)
  - 1964: Flying doctor shadows the mob (translated into German)
  - 1965: Flying doctor hits the headlines (translated into German)
  - 1969: Flying doctor under the desert (translated into German)
- 1963: December Boys; made into a film of the same name released in 2007.
- 1967: Air taxi (translated into Polish)
- 1969: The pink beach
- 1973: The sun is God - biographical fiction about J. M. W. Turner
- 1978: The invincible Mr Az
- 1982: Magwitch
- 1983: A different drummer: the story of E.J. Banfield, the beachcomber of Dunk Island
- 1987: McKenzie's boots - listed as one of the Best Books for Young Adults of 1988 by the American Library Association
- 1995: In with the tide: memoirs of a storyteller - autobiography
