= David McRobbie =

Australian writer

- Born: David Hewitt McRobbie; 17 September 1934 (age 91); Glasgow, Scotland
- Occupation: Writer
- Children: 4
- Writing career
- Genre: Children's books

David Hewitt McRobbie (born 17 September 1934) is an Australian writer of television, radio and children's literature.

== Biography ==
McRobbie was born in Glasgow, Scotland in 1934. In 1958 he moved to Australia and worked as a teacher in the 1960s in Papua New Guinea. He is currently a full-time writer but has previously worked as a television and radio producer, a ship's engineer, and a college lecturer. McRobbie's first published work was in 1976 with a collection of stories, entitled Talking Tree and Other Stories. In 1991 he started writing the series of Wayne which he adapted in 1996 into a television series entitled The Wayne Manifesto. In 2000 he created the television series Eugenie Sandler P.I. and was short-listed for the Children's Book Council of Australia Book of the Year Award for older readers for his novel, Tyro. In 2002 his novel Mum, Me, and the 19th C was a finalist for the Aurealis Award for best young-adult novel.

== List of Works ==
=== Novels ===
Wayne series

- The Wayne Manifesto (1991)
- Waxing with Wayne (1993)
- The Wayne Dynasty (1993)
- The Wages Of Wayne (1994)
- Wayne in the Wings (1994)
- A Whole Lot of Wayne (2008)

Other novels

- Punch Lines (1987)
- Head Over Heels (1990)
- The Fourth Caution (1991)
- This Book Is Haunted (1993)
- Timelock (1993)
- Schemes (1993)
- Mandragora (1994)
- Prices (1995)
- See How They Run (1996)
- Mum, Me, the 19c (1999)
- Tyro (1999)
- Eugenie Sandler P.I. (2000)
- Fergus Mcphail (2001)
- Mum, Me, and the 19th C (2002)
- Strandee (2003)
- Mad Arm of the Y (2005)
- Vinnie's War (2011)

=== Collections ===
- Talking Tree and Other Stories (1976)
- Flying with Granny and Other Stories (1989)

=== Short fiction ===
- "Album" (1995) in Dark House (ed. Gary Crew)

Source: Fantastic Fiction, ISFDB

== Television ==
- The Wayne Manifesto (1996–1997) writer of 26 episodes, adapted from the Wayne series
- See How They Run (1999) adapted from McRobbie's 1996 novel See How They Run
- Eugenie Sandler P.I. (2000) creator and writer
- Fergus McPhail (2004) creator and writer of 26 episodes

Source: IMDB

== Nominations ==
Aurealis Awards

- Best young-adult novel
  - 2002: Nomination: Mum, Me, and the 19th C

two children's awards from the school of the arts sydney Children's Book Council of Australia Book of the Year Award

- Older Readers
  - 2000: Nomination: Tyro
