= Fergus McPhail =

- Written by: David McRobbie
- Directed by: Jean-Pierre Mignon; Jeffrey Walker
- Starring: Sean Ohlendorf; Michael Harrison; Jessie Jacobs; Heli Simpson; Megan Harrington; Marcus Costello; Steven Bahnsen; Reg Gorman
- Country of origin: Australia
- Original language: English
- No. of seasons: 1
- No. of episodes: 26

Production
- Running time: 25 minutes
- Production company: Burberry Productions

Original release
- Network: Network Ten
- Release: 2 January – 25 June 2004

Fergus McPhail is an Australian children's comedy series, based on David McRobbie's 2001 novel of the same name. The series was released on Network Ten in 2004.

== Synopsis ==
Teenage Fergus McPhail (Sean Ohlendorf) has just moved to Melbourne with his family. The series charts a year of his life, as he tries to make his way in the world at home with his erratic family, at school and socially. He stumbles from crisis to crisis, with his irrationally optimistic alter-ego acting as his conscience.

== Cast ==
=== Main ===
- Sean Ohlendorf as Fergus McPhail
- Michael Harrison as Lambert Apanolty
- Brett Swain as Don McPhail (Dad)
- Tammy McCarthy as Moira McPhail (Mum)
- Miriam Glaser as Senga McPhail
- Jessie Jacobs as Jennifer McPhail
- Megan Harrington as Angela Dayton
- Heli Simpson as Sophie Bartolemeo
- Marcus Costello as Richmond Nixon-Claverhouse
- Reg Gorman as Harry Patterson

=== Recurring / guests ===
- Alan Hopgood as Shop Assistant (1 episode)
- Alethea McGrath as Mrs Carmody (1 episode)
- Alex Tsitsopoulos as Angelo 9 episodes)
- Alicia Gardiner as Ms Crombie (9 episodes)
- Andrew Clarke as Ben Cameron (2 episodes)
- Chris Hemsworth as Craig (1 episode)
- Damien Bodie as Leon (4 episodes)
- Frank Gallacher as MacCorkindale (1 episode)
- Glenda Linscott as Gabrielle Clifford (2 episodes)
- Heidi Valkenburg as Maddie (1 episode)
- Joy Westmore as Mrs Vance (5 episodes)
- Julia Zemiro as Female Cop (1 episode)
- Kaarin Fairfax as Ms Rolla (4 episodes)
- Kat Stewart as Director (1 episode)
- Michele Fawdon as Mrs Mobbs (2 episodes)

== Production ==
The series was originally developed as a second season of 1997 series The Wayne Manifesto (1997), but was rejected, so writer David McRobbie turned the scripts into a novel, which was subsequently adapted into Fergus McPhail. The series was produced by Burberry Productions and targeted viewers aged 8–13. It was broadcast on Network 10 from 2 January to 25 June 2004, and was pre-sold to the BBC.

== See also ==
- List of Australian television series
